= Sreedhar Rajan =

Sreedhar Rajan is an Indian journalist and film critic, based in Chennai, Tamil Nadu. He started his career as an advertising executive and later became a film director and screenwriter. His directorial debut Kann Sivanthaal Mann Sivakkum (1983) was based on Indira Parthasarathy's novel Kuruthipunal, about the Kilvenmani massacre of 1968. The film won the Indira Gandhi Award for Best Debut Film of a Director in 1983. Following that, he made films such as Iravu Pookkal (1986) and Pookkal Vidum Thudhu (1987). He has also served various positions including a member of the advisory panel of the Central Board of Film Certification, and the National Film Development Corporation of India. He is married to Jaya Sreedhar Rajan, daughter of Tamil actor Gemini Ganesan.

== Select filmography ==
- Kann Sivanthaal Mann Sivakkum (1983)
- Iravu Pookkal (1986)
- Pookkal Vidum Thudhu (1987)
