= Kann Sivanthaal Mann Sivakkum =

1983 film by Sreedhar Rajan

- Theatrical release poster
- Directed by: Sreedhar Rajan
- Written by: Ananthu–Na. Muthuswamy (dialogues)
- Screenplay by: Sreedhar Rajan
- Based on: Kuruthipunal by Indira Parthasarathy
- Produced by: R. Venkatraman
- Starring: Vijaymohan; Jaishankar; Rajesh; Poornima Jayaram; Jaimala; Subhathra
- Cinematography: Soumendu Roy
- Edited by: V. Rajagopal
- Music by: Ilaiyaraaja
- Release date: 4 March 1983
- Running time: 111 minutes
- Country: India
- Language: Tamil

Kann Sivanthaal Mann Sivakkum (transl. When eyes turn red, the soil will too) is a 1983 Indian Tamil-language film directed by debutant Sreedhar Rajan. Produced by R. Venkatraman, the film won the Indira Gandhi Award for Best Debut Film of a Director at the 30th National Film Awards in 1983. It is based on Indira Parthasarathy's novel Kuruthipunal. The film stars newcomer Vijaymohan and Poornima Jayaram, with Jaishankar, Rajesh, N. Viswanathan and Raveendran in pivotal roles. The score and soundtrack were composed by Ilaiyaraaja while cinematography was handled by Soumendu Roy.

== Plot ==
Gautam, a photojournalist with revolutionary ideas, leaves his job after his editor fails to publish the true happenings of the society in their newspaper. One of Gautam's friends suggests he organise an art exhibition to showcase his paintings. During the event, he happens to meet Arundhati, a Bharatanatyam dancer, who is keen to stage a classical ballet on Nandanar, a tenth century dalit saint. Gautam suggests Arundhati to present it in a folk-art form rather than a classical-art form like Bharatanatyam to which she agrees.

Gautam and Arundhati travel to Kilvenmani, a village in Thanjavur district, Tamil Nadu, to meet Thambiran, an aged exponent of Theru Koothu, a common folk-art form in Tamil Nadu. Gautam and Arundhati both stay at the landlord's (Rajarathinam) house. In the village they happen to meet various characters – Vairam, a tea shop owner, his pregnant wife Valli, their daughter Amudha, Kaalai, a blacksmith, Pakkiri, a mad minstrel, and Papathy, a village belle who works as a maid in Rajarathinam's house. Gautam and Arundhati grow attached to these characters. Vairam and Kaalai stand up against Raja, demanding higher wages for workers employed by Raja. Gautam and Arundhati meet Thambiran, who agrees to help them stage the ballet. An angered Raja tells the police that Vairam's teashop has encroached the temple's land, and orders his henchmen to destroy the shop. Kaalai provides shelter to Vairam and his family. Gautam, on seeing the injustice being done to Vairam, talks to Raja for which the latter advises him not to interfere in the matter. Papathy wishes to be photographed and approaches Gautam for which Raja's henchmen attack him. After this incident, Gautam and Arundhati leave Raja's house and take shelter at Thambiran's house. While researching Nandanar's biography, Gautam gets a new perspective for the story based on the events that take place in the village and develops a story based on Raja's cruel acts. In the meanwhile, Raja's goons abduct Vairam. A group of villagers led by Kaalai gather outside Raja's house. Gautam approaches Papathy to join the protest against Raja and asks her to reveal the whereabouts of Vairam. Kaalai and the villagers rescue Vairam after Papathy lets them know that Vairam is kept at Raja's rice mill.

As the villagers protest demanding higher wages, Raja employs workers from nearby villages. When Vairam and Kaalai try to stop the workers, Raja arrives with a group of policemen. Kaalai beats Raja and gets immediately arrested for the act. A lawyer bails out Kaalai and ask them to take police protection to which they refuse. Vairam and Kaalai are attacked by Raja's henchmen while returning to their village during which Kaalai gets killed. With the help of the police, Raja labels Kaalai as a Naxalite to get the case closed. On hearing this, the villagers refuse to cremate Kaalai, but Vairam cremates him outside the village. Meanwhile, Raja files a complaint against Gautam, Arundhati and Vairam on a false pretext that they have stolen his possessions and attacked his mother. Arundhati gets saved by one of the villagers when Raja's goons try to molest her. The goons also set Kaalai's hut on fire, but Pakiri saves Vairam's family. He along with Vairam fight Raja's goons and kill them before being arrested by the police. The whole colony gets burnt. The following day, Raja is seen walking happily on his land. Papathy meets him and at first appears affectionate, but after they hug, she stabs him to death.

== Cast ==
- Vijay Menon as Gautam
- Poornima Jayaram as Arundhati
- Jaishankar as Vairam
- Rajesh as Kaalai
- Calcutta Viswanathan as Rajarathinam "Raja"
- Raveendran as Pakkiri
- Jayamala as Valli, Vairam's wife
- Subhathra as Papathy

== Production ==
Sreedhar Rajan, a journalist and film critic, wrote the screenplay of Kann Sivanthaal Mann Sivakkum based on Indira Parthasarathy's novel Kuruthipunal which won the Sahitya Akademi Award in 1977. The novel, in turn was based on the Kilvenmani massacre that took place in Thanjavur district in 1968. Inspired by the novel, Sreedhar Rajan made the film with a revolutionary theme, set in the backdrop of folk-arts. It marked Sreedhar Rajan's directorial debut. Sreedhar Rajan used a fusion of revolutionary communism and folk in the film. The film narrated the tale of Nandanar, a dalit saint and one of the 63 Nayanars. Bharatanatyam dancer V. P. Dhananjayan appeared in a song sequence, thus performing for the first time in a film. The sequence was meant to narrate Nandanar Charitam, the story of the saint. The filming was held at Padappai near Chennai and Panaimarathupatti near Salem.

== Soundtrack ==
Soundtrack was composed by Ilaiyaraaja.

Track listing
No.	Title	Lyrics	Singer(s)	Length
1.	"Nandhan Enbavan"		Malaysia Vasudevan, Saibaba
2.	"Karuvil Ulla"		Saibaba
3.	"Manidha Manidha"		K. J. Yesudas
4.	"Pogum Thisai Maranthu"		Gangai Amaran
5.	"Nirvanathai"		A. Sundarrajan, Gangai Amaran
6.	"Serikul Irukinra Sirpam"		L. Rajeshwari
7.	"Vandhale Allippoo"	Vairamuthu	Ilayaraja	2:21

== Release and reception ==
Kann Sivanthaal Mann Sivakkum was released on 4 March 1983. During its theatrical release, the film had an average run, but received critical acclaim. At the 30th National Film Awards, it won the Indira Gandhi Award for Best Debut Film of a Director, while its cinematographer Soumendu Roy won the Tamil Nadu State Film Award for Best Cinematographer in 1983. Kalki appreciated Viswanathan's performance, but felt Vijaymohan could have done better. Balumani of Anna praised the acting of cast but felt Vijaymohan and Poornima were there for namesake while also appreciating Ananthu's dialogues, Roy's cinematography, folk dance but found Ilayaraja's music as routine and called the film as just okay.

== Sources ==
- Dhananjayan, G. (2014). Pride of Tamil Cinema: 1931–2013. Blue Ocean Publishers. OCLC 898765509.
