= SCUD (company) =

- Type: Proprietorship
- Industry: Motion picture
- Founded: 1998
- Founder: Satarupa Sanyal
- Headquarters: Kolkata, India
- Key people: Ritabhari Chakraborty; Satarupa Sanyal
- Services: Production
- Divisions: Film Production

SCUD is an Indian film production and distribution company established and owned by Satarupa Sanyal in 1998. In the same year, the independent film maker produced and directed her debut film ANU (Bengali / feature / 35mm / 12reels). The success and widespread recognition of the ANU, nationally and overseas, laid the foundation of the company.

Till date SCUD has produced more than 50 short films, 4 feature films, TVC, Music videos, telefilms, documentaries and awareness films.

From 2017 onwards, Ritabhari Chakraborty has been heading the company alongside of her mother Satarupa Sanyal. The former has taken charge of national advertisements and other motion picture projects.

The mother-daughter duo also runs an NGO together namely "Scud society for Social Communication" and they prefer to focus on the development of women especially in the rural areas in West Bengal.

== Filmography ==
=== Films ===
| Year | Film | Director | Cast | Notes | Ref |
|---|---|---|---|---|---|
| 1998 | Anu | Satarupa Sanyal | Indrani Haldar, Nirmalya Banerjee | Produced by SCUD; Film was selected in Indian Panorama (1999). | |
| 2002 | Atatayee | Satarupa Sanyal | Indrani Haldar, Chiranjeet, Barun Chanda, Tapas Pal | Produced by SCUD | |
| 2003 | Tanyabi Firti | Satarupa Sanyal | | Produced by Films Division, Govt. of India | |
| 2004 | Kalo Chita | Satarupa Sanyal | Rituparna Sengupta, Sharad Kapoor | Produced by Palchaudhury movies | |
| 2012 | Tobuo Basanta | Satarupa Sanyal | Rahul Banerjee, Ritabhari Chakraborty | Produced by Giniya Entertainment; Released in 2018 | |
| 2014 | Once Upon a Time in Calcutta | Satarupa Sanyal | Ritabhari Chakraborty, Rajatava Dutta | Produced by Akash movies | |
| 2015 | Ondhokarer Nodi | Satarupa Sanyal | | Produced by SCUD | |
| 2016 | Onyo Opalaa | Satarupa Sanyal | Roopa Ganguly, Ritabhari Chakraborty, Bhaswar Chatterjee, Nigel Akkara | Produced by SCUD | |

=== Short films ===
| Year | Name | Director | Cast | Notes | Media Link | Ref |
|---|---|---|---|---|---|---|
| 2017 | Naked | Rakesh Kumar | Kalki Koechlin, Ritabhari Chakraborty | Produced by SCUD, AOC and Live Signages; Nominated for Jio Filmfare 2018. Awareness on Cyber Bullying | YouTube Link | |
| 2018 | Fool For Love | Satarupa Sanyal | Anurag Kashyap, Ritabhari Chakraborty | Produced by Large Short Films. | YouTube Link | |
| 2019 | Valentines Day Special | Satarupa Sanyal | Parambrata Chatterjee, Ritabhari Chakraborty | Produced by Nykaa. | YouTube Link | |

=== Music videos ===
| Year | Song | Director | Cast | Notes | Media Link | Ref |
|---|---|---|---|---|---|---|
| 2017 | Orrey Mon | Satarupa Sanyal | Ayushmann Khurrana, Ritabhari Chakraborty | Produced by SCUD. | YouTube Link | |
| 2017 | Adda Song | Satarupa Sanyal | Kunal Karan Kapoor, Ritabhari Chakraborty | Produced by SCUD. Presented by Mother Dairy. | YouTube Link | |

=== Advertisements ===
| Year | Name | Director | Cast | Notes | Media Link | Ref |
|---|---|---|---|---|---|---|
| 2018 | The Goddess Within – Ode to Durga Pujo | Satarupa Sanyal | Ritabhari Chakraborty | Produced by Nykaa. | YouTube Link | |
