= 30th National Film Awards (India) =

1983 Indian film award

- 30th National Film Awards
- Awarded for: Best of Indian cinema in 1982
- Awarded by: Directorate of Film Festivals
- Presented by: Giani Zail Singh (President of India)
- Presented on: May 1983
- Official website: dff.nic.in

Highlights
- Best Feature Film: Chokh
- Best Book: Chalachitra Sameeksha
- Dadasaheb Phalke Award: L. V. Prasad
- Most awards: Meghasandesam (4)

The 30th National Film Awards, presented by Directorate of Film Festivals, the organisation set up by Ministry of Information and Broadcasting, India to felicitate the best of Indian Cinema released in the year 1982. Ceremony took place in May 1983 and awards were given by then President of India, Giani Zail Singh.

With 30th National Film Awards, new category for Best Non-Feature Film on Family Welfare was introduced.

== Juries ==
Three different committees were formed for feature films, short films and books on cinema, headed by veteran director Hrishikesh Mukherjee, Durga Khote and K. K. Nair respectively.

- Jury Members: Feature Films
  - Hrishikesh Mukherjee (Chairperson) • N. B. Kamath • Amita Malik • Komala Varadan • V. Shivaraman • K. V. Subbanna • Girish Kasaravalli • Valampuri Somanathan • Kanchana • Manzoor • Anil Varshney • Nabendu Ghosh • Subodh Roy • Kamal Bose
- Jury Members: Short Films
  - Durga Khote (Chairperson) • S. Krishnaswamy • Siddharth Kak
- Jury Members: Books on Cinema
  - K. K. Nair (Chairperson) • Swapan Mullick • Samik Bandyopadhyay • Bikram Singh • Suresh Kohli • Thakazhi Sivasankara Pillai • Omcheri N. N. Pillai • K. S. Srinivasan • Kaa. Naa. Subramaniam

== Awards ==
Awards were divided into feature films, non-feature films and books written on Indian cinema.

=== Lifetime Achievement Award ===
Name of Award	Image	Awardee(s)	Awarded As	Awards
Dadasaheb Phalke Award		L. V. Prasad	Actor and Film producer	Swarna Kamal, ₹40,000 and a Shawl

=== Feature films ===
Feature films were awarded at All India as well as regional level. For 30th National Film Awards, a Bengali film, Chokh won the National Film Award for Best Feature Film whereas a Telugu film, Meghasandesam won the maximum number of awards (four). Following were the awards given in each category:

==== All India Award ====
Following were the awards given:

Name of Award	Name of Film	Language	Awardee(s)	Cash prize
Best Feature Film	Chokh	Bengali	Producer: Government of West Bengal	Swarna Kamal and ₹50,000/-
Best Feature Film	Chokh	Bengali	director: Utpalendu Chakrabarty	Swarna Kamal and ₹25,000/-
Best Feature Film	Citation: For its courage in exposing an aspect of contemporary reality which has great social relevance and for doing so with passion and integrity.			
Second Best Feature Film	Kharij	Bengali	Producer: Neel Kanth Films	Rajat Kamal and ₹30,000/-
Second Best Feature Film	Kharij	Bengali	Director: Mrinal Sen	Rajat Kamal and ₹15,000/-
Second Best Feature Film	Citation: For the subtlety and simplicity with which it analyses the dehumanisation creeping into our society, with cinematic elegance and economy of expression.			
Best Feature Film on National Integration	Aroodam	Malayalam	Producer: Rosamma George	Rajat Kamal and ₹30,000/-
Best Feature Film on National Integration	Aroodam	Malayalam	Director: I. V. Sasi	Rajat Kamal and ₹15,000/-
Best Feature Film on National Integration	Citation: For its compassionate treatment of the plight of the under-privileged.			
Best Film on Family Welfare	Spandan	Hindi	Producer: Satyanarayanan Misra, Abdul Majid and Durga Nanda	Rajat Kamal and ₹30,000/-
Best Film on Family Welfare	Spandan	Hindi	Director: Biplab Roy Chowdhary	Rajat Kamal and ₹15,000/-
Best Film on Family Welfare	Citation: For its intense and graphic representation of the twin problem of poverty and over-population, which it tackles on the level of both the family and of society.			
Best Debut Film of a Director	Kann Sivanthaal Mann Sivakkum	Tamil	Producer: R. Venkat Raman; Director: Sreedhar Rajan	Rajat Kamal and ₹10,000/-
Best Debut Film of a Director	Citation: For its original interpretation of a deep-rooted social evil, combining folk art with modern cinematic idiom.			
Best Direction	Chokh	Bengali	Utpalendu Chakrabarty	Rajat Kamal
Best Direction	Citation: For his merciless expose of several aspects of social injustice with admirable command over his medium.			
Best Screenplay	Kharij	Bengali	Mrinal Sen	Rajat Kamal and ₹10,000/-
Best Screenplay	Citation: For its economy of expression in the treatment of a sensitive theme.			
Best Actor	Moondram Pirai	Tamil	Kamal Haasan	Rajat Kamal and ₹10,000/-
Best Actor	Citation: For the versatility and naturalness with which he portrays the character of Seenu.			
Best Actress	Arth	Hindi	Shabana Azmi	Rajat Kamal and ₹10,000/-
Best Actress	Citation: For the restraint with which she conveys a wide range of emotions.			
Best Child Artist	Aroodam	Malayalam	Vimal	Rajat Kamal and ₹5,000/-
Best Child Artist	Citation: For its touching innocence and lack of self-consciousness which lend meaning to the theme.			
Best Cinematography (Color)	Moondram Pirai	Tamil	Balu Mahendra	Rajat Kamal and ₹10,000/-
Best Cinematography (Color)	Citation: For the brilliant use of vivid imagery to create variety of moods.			
Best Audiography	Namkeen	Hindi	Essabhai M. Suratwala	Rajat Kamal and ₹10,000/-
Best Audiography	Citation: For his skilful structuring of the sound track to create the atmosphere for the film.			
Best Editing	Arth	Hindi	Keshav Hirani	Rajat Kamal and ₹10,000/-
Best Editing	Citation: For sustaining the inherent tension in the plot by precise timing and artistic juxtaposition of images and sounds.			
Best Art Direction	Kharij	Bengali	Nitish Roy	Rajat Kamal and ₹10,000/-
Best Art Direction	Citation: For recreating milieu with delicate details.			
Best Music Direction	Meghasandesam	Telugu	Ramesh Naidu	Rajat Kamal and ₹10,000/-
Best Music Direction	Citation: For his use of classical music to enhance the aesthetic quality of the film.			
Best Male Playback Singer	Meghasandesam	Telugu	K. J. Yesudas	Rajat Kamal and ₹10,000/-
Best Male Playback Singer	Citation: For his rich contribution to the musical element of the film.			
Best Female Playback Singer	Meghasandesam	Telugu	P. Susheela	Rajat Kamal and ₹10,000/-
Best Female Playback Singer	Citation: For her immense contribution to the musical excellence of the film.			

==== Regional Award ====
The awards were given to the best films made in the regional languages of India. For feature films in Gujarati, Kashmiri and Punjabi language, award for Best Feature Film was not given.

Name of Award	Name of Film	Awardee(s)	Awards
Best Feature Film in Assamese	Aparoopa	Producer: Jahnu Barua, NFDC	Rajat Kamal and ₹15,000/-
Best Feature Film in Assamese	Aparoopa	Director: Jahnu Barua	Rajat Kamal and ₹7,500/-
Best Feature Film in Assamese	Citation: For its deeply felt and controlled study of life in a village.		
Best Feature Film in Bengali	Nagmoti	Producer: Sibaprasad Sen	Rajat Kamal and ₹15,000/-
Best Feature Film in Bengali	Nagmoti	Director: Gautam Chattopadhyay	Rajat Kamal and ₹7,500/-
Best Feature Film in Bengali	Citation: For its absorbing portrayal of an ethnic group.		
Best Feature Film in Hindi	Katha	Producer: Suresh Jindal	Rajat Kamal and ₹15,000/-
Best Feature Film in Hindi	Katha	Director: Sai Paranjpye	Rajat Kamal and ₹7,500/-
Best Feature Film in Hindi	Citation: For its social satire of great charm and wit.		
Best Feature Film in Kannada	Phaniyamma	Producer: Prema Karanth	Rajat Kamal and ₹15,000/-
Best Feature Film in Kannada	Phaniyamma	Director: Prema Karanth	Rajat Kamal and ₹7,500/-
Best Feature Film in Kannada	Citation: For its poignant portrayal of a real life character, who stood up single handed against cruel social customs.		
Best Feature Film in Malayalam	Chappa	Producer: P. K. Abdul Latif	Rajat Kamal and ₹15,000/-
Best Feature Film in Malayalam	Chappa	Director: P. K. Baker	Rajat Kamal and ₹7,500/-
Best Feature Film in Malayalam	Citation: For its powerful depiction of a lone individual's determined fight against tyranny.		
Best Feature Film in Marathi	Shapit	Producer: Madhukar Rupji, Sudha Chitale and Vinay Newalkar	Rajat Kamal and ₹15,000/-
Best Feature Film in Marathi	Shapit	Director: Arvind Deshpande and Rajdutt	Rajat Kamal and ₹7,500/-
Best Feature Film in Marathi	Citation: For dealing with several dimensions of feudalism.		
Best Feature Film in Tamil	Ezhavathu Manithan	Producer: Palai N. Shanmugam	Rajat Kamal and ₹15,000/-
Best Feature Film in Tamil	Ezhavathu Manithan	Director: K. Hariharan	Rajat Kamal and ₹7,500/-
Best Feature Film in Tamil	Citation: For focusing attention on the important topical problems of pollution and industrial exploitation.		
Best Feature Film in Telugu	Meghasandesam	Producer: Dasari Narayana Rao	Rajat Kamal and ₹15,000/-
Best Feature Film in Telugu	Meghasandesam	Director: Dasari Narayana Rao	Rajat Kamal and ₹7,500/-
Best Feature Film in Telugu	Citation: For its lyrical and aesthetic qualities.		

=== Non-Feature films ===
Following were the awards given:

Name of Award	Name of Film	Language	Awardee(s)	Cash prize
Best Information Film	An Indian Story	English	Producer: Suhasini Mulay; Director: Tapan K. Bose	Rajat Kamal and ₹5,000/- Each
Best Information Film	Citation: For an outstanding investigate report into a subject of national concern and for its moving, graphic and sensitive treatment of a controversial subject.			
Best Educational / Instructional Film	Kooduthal Paal Venamenkil	Malayalam	Producer: Kerala State Film Development Corporation; Director: V. R. Gopinath	Rajat Kamal and ₹5,000/- Each
Best Educational / Instructional Film	Citation: For a simple yet explicit film, with a down to earth approach, presenting nature's procreation with both restraint and beauty.			
Best Film on Family Welfare	Kal Aur Aaj	Hindi	Producer and Director: Vimala Swaminathan	Rajat Kamal and ₹5,000/- Each
Best Film on Family Welfare	Citation: For family planning as a simple, entertaining and direct comparison of the situation of today, with the past, in terms immediately understandable to the common man.			
Best Experimental Film	Chakkar Chandu Ka Chameliwala	Hindi	Producer: Film and Television Institute of India; Director: N. C. Thade	Rajat Kamal and ₹5,000/- Each
Best Experimental Film	Citation: For being a romantically mysterious film which successfully dispenses with the normal time-space framework and chronological sequence.			
Best Animation Film	Raju and Tinku	English	Producer: Children's Film Society director and Animator: Ajoy Kumar Chakrabarty	Rajat Kamal and ₹5,000/- Each
Best Animation Film	Citation: For an outstanding work in difficult art of puppet animation, made with professional finesse, a joyous treat to child and adult audiences alike.			
Best News Review	Asiad 82 – News 1	English	N. S. Thapa for Films Division	Rajat Kamal and ₹5,000/-
Best News Review	Citation: For an evocative and stirring record of one of the most colourful events of our time.			

=== Best Writing on Cinema ===
Following were the awards given:

Name of Award	Name of Book	Language	Awardee(s)	Cash prize
Best Book on Cinema	Chalachitra Sameeksha	Malayalam	Author: Vijayakrishnan	Rajat Kamal and ₹5,000/-
Best Book on Cinema	Citation: For fairly systematic analysis of the way in which the film has reflected the major concerns of man-aesthetic, social, spiritual — with specific reference to various film classics and the outlooks of well known directors, for persuasive argument and clear communication.			

=== Awards not given ===
Following were the awards not given as no film was found to be suitable for the award:

- Best Cinematography (Black and White)
- Best Children's Film
- Best Lyrics
- Best Popular Film Providing Wholesome Entertainment
- Best Film on Social Documentation
- Best Promotional Film
- Best Newsreel Cameraman
- Best Feature Film in English
- Best Feature Film in Manipuri
- Best Feature Film in Oriya
- Best Feature Film in Punjabi
