= Venghai =

2011 film by Hari

- Theatrical release poster
- Directed by: Hari
- Written by: Hari
- Produced by: B. Venkatrama Reddy
- Starring: Dhanush; Tamannaah Bhatia; Rajkiran; Prakash Raj
- Cinematography: Vetri
- Edited by: V. T. Vijayan
- Music by: Devi Sri Prasad
- Production company: Vijaya Productions
- Distributed by: Vijaya Productions
- Release date: 7 July 2011
- Running time: 155 minutes
- Country: India
- Language: Tamil

Venghai (Tamil pronunciation: [ʋeːŋɡaɪ]; transl. Tiger) is a 2011 Indian Tamil-language action comedy film directed by Hari and produced by B. Venkatrama Reddy. The film stars Dhanush, Tamannaah Bhatia, Rajkiran, and Prakash Raj. The music was composed by Devi Sri Prasad with cinematography by Vetri Palanisamy and editing by V. T. Vijayan. Venghai was released on 7 July 2011.

== Plot ==
Veerapandi is a respected man in Pandiapuram, Sivagangai district who controls around 50% of the votes in his constituency. He is married to Thangam and has two children, Selvam and Selvi. Rajalingam is the corrupt incumbent local MLA from the ruling party, who was elected with backing from Veerapandi. Rajalingam pretends to be loyal only for Veerapandi's support. One day, the district collector organises a meeting to decide the location of a new railway station, where Rajalingam has already pre-fixed a town for bribery purposes. However, Veerapandi thwarts Rajalingam's plan and convinces the meeting to set another small town as the location for the station. Rajalingam's men bomb a railway track to derail a train, but Selvam stops the train and catches the bombers.

Frustrated that Selvam screwed up the chance to catch the real perpetrator, Veerapandi sends Selvam to Tiruchirappalli to stay with his uncle Mariyappan, a real estate agent, to protect him. In Tiruchirappalli, Selvam meets his childhood friend Radhika and also makes Mariyappan return money to Radhika's uncle, who had bought land from Mariyappan, which then led to a civil struggle with the air force. Selvam also gets beaten up by a local thug, Peter, due to an SMS joke by Radhika on Peter, who is filmed attacking Selvam by a professor, and he is imprisoned. Rajalingam tries to kill Selvam to weaken Veerapandi and uses Peter's local gang in Tiruchy. Selvam saves a college professor from being assaulted by Peter's gang, and a fight ensues. Peter is beaten up and goes to bring Anburaj and his men.

Veerapandi learns of Selvam's issues and arrives at the college at the same time. Anbu realizes Selvam is Veerapandi's son and begs for forgiveness. Veerapandi learns that Rajalingam is about to buy a huge plot of land with black money, catches him red-handed after the registration in Tiruchirappalli, and thrashes him. Selvam arrives there accidentally, and the father-son duo makes Rajalingam donate the land to Sivagangai Corporation. Veerapandi also commands Rajalingam to resign within a week, or he will be killed, with both events causing a by-election. Rajalingam gets enraged and sends goons to kill Selvam again. When he is cornered, Selvam is forced to take an aruval and defend himself, which the crowd films. Veerapandi arrives to save Selvam, but the latter gets arrested and remanded for 15 days as his actions have reached the press.

Veerapandi swears to kill Rajalingam once he returns from the legislature meeting. After seeing Selvam's violence, Radhika decides not to disclose her love. Selvam is released and plans to kill Rajalingam, who has become a PWD minister by using a political crisis and openly challenges to kill off Veerapandi in 30 days, as he does not need his support anymore. Selvam challenges Rajalingam that either Rajalingam will die within 30 days or Selvam will publicly apologise to him. Radhika learns that Selvam helped her uncle by recovering the money invested in the disputed land. After much hesitation, Radhika proposes to Selvam, who accepts. Radhika introduces herself to Selvam's parents. Meanwhile, Rajalingam plans to kill Veerapandi, knowing about his train journey based on information from an anonymous caller.

However, Selvam arrives to the rescue and attacks the goons. Meanwhile, the truck sent to hit Veerapandi's car kills an innocent family, whose deaths cause Veerapandi to tell Rajalingam that the family's death will never go unpunished. Later, Veerapandi realises that he drank poisoned coffee and is rushed to the hospital, where his life is saved. Selvam is shocked to find that Radhika poisoned the coffee and was the one who informed Rajalingam about Veerapandi's travel plans. Selvam rushes to Radhika's home, where her mother Padmavathi and grandfather tells that Veerapandi killed Radhika's father Manickavel years ago, and they were waiting for an opportunity to exact vengeance. Veerapandi arrives at Radhika's home, overhears their conversation, and reveals the truth that it was the ruling party's goons who killed Manickavel and not Veerapandi.

Radhika's family feels guilty about their actions. Selvam feels betrayed that Radhika cheated him, but Radhika's family apologises to Veerapandi. He and Thangam forgive Radhika's mistake and urge Selvam to accept Radhika, which he does. Rajalingam hires 50 men from Rameswaram to kill both Veerapandi and Selvam, which is overheard by a driver working for Rajalingam. When he tries to alert Veerapandi, Rajalingam's goons kill him and one of Veerapandi's closest allies, which is seen by Veerapandi's caretaker and alerts them. Selvam hatches a plan with other villagers to burn hayfields and make it look like the job is already done, and leaves to kill Rajalingam. Selvam gets men to distract Rajalingam's goons and kills them one by one. The burnt haystacks make the Rameshwaram goons think that the job is done, and they leave. Selvam then lures Rajalingam to a place where he kills him, and then escapes to Kuala Lumpur. Six months later, Selvam returns to Pandiapuram, where he happily reunites with Radhika and his family.

== Cast ==
- Dhanush as Selvam
  - Sree Raam as Young Selvam
- Tamannaah Bhatia as Radhika
- Rajkiran as Veerapandi
- Prakash Raj as Rajalingam
- Ganja Karuppu as Ganesan
- Y. G. Mahendran as a Tamil professor
- Urvashi as Thangam
- Sudha Chandran as Padmavathi
- Charle as Murugesan
- Livingston as Mariyappan
- Nizhalgal Ravi as Manickavel
- G. Srinivasan as Radhika's paternal grandfather
- Azhagu as Gurusaamy
- Ponnambalam as Anburaj
- A. C. Murali Mohan as the district collector
- O. A. K. Sundar as DSP Rajmohan
- Srithika as Selvi
- Shivani as Jayanthi
- Paravai Muniyamma as Veerapandi's house cook
- Uma as Rajalingam's wife
- Bayilvan Ranganathan as Veerapandi's associate
- Rajendranath as Rajalingam's associate
- Nandha Saravanan as Peter
- Sampath Ram as Sivam
- Benjamin as Vasu
- Rajadurai as Rajalingam's driver
- Cool Suresh as Selvam's friend

== Production ==
Director Hari revealed that the script of Venghai was completed in 2009, and Rajkiran was the first actor to be cast. Dhanush and Tamannaah Bhatia were cast as the lead pair for the second time after Padikkadavan (2009). Kalabhavan Mani was originally cast as the antagonist but had a fallout with Hari, and was later replaced by Prakash Raj. Filming began in November 2010 at Karaikudi. The film was also shot at Tiruchirappalli, while separate song sequences were shot at Munnar, Kuala Lumpur, and Phuket. Filming was complete by early May 2011.

== Soundtrack ==
The soundtrack was composed by Devi Sri Prasad. The audio launch was held on 10 June 2011. Karthik of Milliblog wrote, "the first three tracks provide enough value for this soundtrack – good going, DSP".

Track listing
No.	Title	Lyrics	Singer(s)	Length
1.	"Dhenam Dhenam"	Viveka, Baba Sehgal (rap portions)	Benny Dayal, Baba Sehgal	4:45
2.	"Kaalangathale"	Viveka	Karthik	5:12
3.	"Yenna Solla Pore"	Hari	Devi Sri Prasad, M. L. R. Karthikeyan	4:24
4.	"Orey Oru"	Viveka	Tippu, Harini	3:57
5.	"Pudikale Pudikudhu"	Viveka	Mukesh, Suchitra	4:17
Total length:				22:35

== Release ==
In early June 2011, Sun Pictures acquired the distribution rights of Venghai for an undisclosed "record price". Venghai was cleared for release by the censor board in mid-June. However, almost a week later Sun Pictures withdrew from the project and the production company themselves took over distribution. In the same month, D. Kalaiselvam of Eka Chakra Media filed a plea in the Madras High Court to stall the film's release, saying he had registered the title Venghai for a different film and had even begun filming it. However, the court closed the case in favour of Hari's film, with the title unchanged, and the film was released on 7 July 2011 as planned.

=== Reception ===
Pavithra Srinivasan of Rediff.com gave the film 2.5 out of 5, labelling it as "tedious" and "an overdose of rural action", further claiming that it was "so overlaid with unnecessary bloodshed, repetitive action and predictable plot twists, that after a point you lose interest". IANS gave 2.5 of 5, saying that the film was "typical Hari style formula movie [...] Despite the predictable story, Hari has managed to make the script interesting to some extent [...] The major flaw is that the story and screenplay have nothing new. Everything happens in a predictable manner." Deccan Herald wrote, "Long and loony, Venghai, a trite, tiresome tamasha is best left for those seeking timepass and paisa vasool than ensemble entertainer[nment]".

The New Indian Express wrote, "Though the film may not have touched the entertainment-level of the director's earlier [Singam], with unpretentious and racy scenes, Venghai keeps you engaged for the most part". Sify wrote, "It is old wine in a new tetra pack with hardly any story or twists but it is the furious speed at which the movie moves and the characterisation of Dhanush, Prakash Raj and Raj Kiran which makes it work to a large extent". The Times of India wrote, "Hari, who has an enviable track record because of movies such as Saamy, Vel and Singam, fails in coming up with a gripping screenplay this time".

=== Box office ===
Venghai opened at number one at the Chennai box office, grossing around ₹9 million (equivalent to ₹20 million or US$220,000 in 2026) within four days. However it dropped to third and fifth places by the second and third week respectively, being considered an "average" performer by then. According to a 2025 estimate by Cineulagam, the film grossed ₹160 million (equivalent to ₹360 million or US$3.8 million in 2026) in its lifetime.
