= Vaanam Vasappadum =

2004 film by P. C. Sreeram

- Theatrical release poster
- Directed by: P. C. Sreeram
- Screenplay by: Lara; P. C. Sreeram
- Based on: Vaanam Vasappadum by Sujatha
- Produced by: R. K. Raghunath
- Starring: Karthik Kumar; Poongkothai Chandrahasan
- Cinematography: P. C. Sreeram
- Edited by: Kasi Viswanathan
- Music by: Mahesh Mahadevan
- Production company: R. K. Digital Film Makers
- Release date: 23 April 2004
- Country: India
- Language: Tamil

Vaanam Vasappadum (transl. The Skies will be Conquered) is a 2004 Indian Tamil-language drama film directed, photographed and co-written by P. C. Sreeram. The film stars newcomers Karthik Kumar and Poongkothai Chandrahasan, with Avinash Devadanam, Ranjith Bhimsingh, Revathi, Nassar, Vijayakumar, and Thalaivasal Vijay in supporting roles. The music was composed by Mahesh Mahadevan with editing by Kasi Viswanathan, and cinematography by Sreeram himself.

The film was based on a novel written by Sujatha. It was released on 23 April 2004 and was the first high definition film to be shot, edited and released in India.

== Plot ==
Karthik, a young lawyer, falls in love with Poongothai, the daughter of a businessman. Poongothai's father and sister run a multi-level market and are imprisoned on false accusations. Karthik brings Poongothai to his parents and seeks permission from his mother and speech-impaired father. Karthik and Poongothai eventually get married after his parents' consent.

One day while travelling back home, their car breaks down, and they decide to board a bus. However, both of them miss each other while travelling in the bus, and Poongothai falls into the hands of a group of teenagers, who are projected as womanizers. In the event, Poongothai is raped by the group and is thrown out with her hands tied at the back. After the event, issues of how she faces the humiliation and gets justice for the act form the rest of the story.

Despite escaping somewhere else, Poongothai wants to fight back the humiliation. An opposition lawyer in the support of womanizers humiliates Poongothai in the court with vulgar questions. Two of the boys are kept captive under Karthik's family friend, a cop, to render poetic justice. The opposition lawyer appears to save the boys, but the boys, who have realised the error of their ways, push the lawyer. All three of them fall down to their deaths in the building's basement, which is under construction.

== Cast ==
- Karthik Kumar as Karthik
- Poongkothai Chandrahasan as Poongothai
- Avinash Devadanam
- Ranjith Bhimsingh as Babu
- Shankar Sundaram as Karthik's lawyer
- Nassar as Karthik's father
- Revathi as Karthik's mother
- Vijayakumar as Poongothai's father
- Thalaivasal Vijay as Opposition Lawyer
- Cochin Haneefa
- Delhi Ganesh as Ganesan
- Raviprakash as Karthik's family friend
- Vijay Adhiraj as Aadhi Narayanan
- Ajay Rathnam as the police inspector
- Bosskey as Postman
- Kovai Sarala as Lakshmi
- Janaki Sabesh as Poongothai's sister
- Nithya Ravindran as Ganesan's wife

== Production ==
The film was based on a novel by Sujatha, which in turn was inspired from a real-life incident. After having read the story 10 years before the film was released, Sreeram had a thought of directing it and "reserved" his rights for filming it in future. The film was initially launched with newcomers Gautham and Pooja, a former Miss Chennai announced as the lead pair. However, Sreeram replaced the pair with another pair of debutants Karthik Kumar and Poongothai Chandrahasan. Karthik replaced Manish Borundia, who was dropped owing to his strong Hindi accent. Vaanam Vasappadum was Sreeram's third film as director and was the first motion picture in India to use high-definition digital technology. The film was launched in July 2002.

== Soundtrack ==
The soundtrack and background score were composed by Mahesh Mahadevan, who earlier worked with Sreeram in Kuruthipunal, and it was his posthumous project before his death. The lyrics were written by Kavivarman and Jayendra. When Mahesh was admitted in hospital for cancer, he composed all the songs there and sent them to Sriram through tape recorder which were recorded in studio by his then assistant, Sundar C. Babu. The audio was launched at Radio Mirchi office at Chennai.

Track listing
No.	Title	Singer(s)	Length
1.	"Vaanam Vasappadume"	Srinivas, Timmy
2.	"Megame Megame"	Harini
3.	"Uyire"	Hariharan, Ganga
4.	"Kangal Theendi"	Hariharan, Shwetha Menon
5.	"Kanne Kanne"	Srinivas
6.	"Seidhi Suda"	Ranjith
7.	"Vaanin Uyaram"	Harish Raghavendra, Gopika Poornima

== Release and reception ==
Vaanam Vasappadum was released theatrically in India on 23 April 2004. The film was showcased at the Mumbai International Film Festival and the ninth International Film Festival of Kerala in India.

Malathi Rangarajan of The Hindu wrote, "[Poongothai] is a clear let down ... At least she could have worked on her expressions, particularly in the first half." The review also noted that, the screenplay was not so impressive and could have made the original story more insightful. However, the soundtrack received positive response with the song "Uyirae" being much appreciated for its music and visual theme. Baradwaj Rangan wrote for The Economic Times, "Somewhere down the line, Vaanam Vasappadum becomes a case of several powerful moments that don’t quite add up to a singularly powerful movie."

Sify wrote, "Vaanam Vassappadum is a vital, sardonic and disturbing brave attempt by the director at good cinema. P.C.Sriram has taken a bold and daring subject which normal film makers shy away from – the trauma of a rape victim especially the humiliation heaped upon her by the society and judiciary". Visual Dasan of Kalki praised Mahesh's soundtrack, Sriram's cinematography, acting of cast and Sujatha for creating a story with down-to-earth incidents and characters and noted the screenplay in first half was fast but the second half especially court scenes were sticky and also felt Sriram lagged behind and criticised him for portraying the heroine's aftermath in flashback in detail.

The film was re-released in November 2004 after digital colour correction, which further improved the visual quality of the picture.
