= Batshorik =

2025 Indian Bengali horror drama film

- Theatrical release poster
- Directed by: Mainak Bhaumik
- Screenplay by: Mainak Bhaumik
- Story by: Mainak Bhaumik
- Produced by: Subhajit Mondal; Sutapa Mondal
- Starring: Ritabhari Chakraborty; Satabdi Roy
- Cinematography: Subhadeep Naskar
- Edited by: Sumit Chowdhury
- Music by: Songs: Savvy; Score: Siljait Chakraborty
- Production companies: Big Screen Productions House; Samreedh Seeds
- Release date: June 6, 2025
- Running time: 121 minutes
- Country: India
- Language: Bengali

Batshorik (transl. Death Anniversary) is a 2025 Indian Bengali-language psychological horror film written and directed by Mainak Bhaumik. Produced by Subhajit Mondal under the banner of Big Screen Productions House, the film marks Satabdi Roy's return to the films after a long hiatus, owing to her political preoccupation. The film stars Roy and Ritabhari Chakraborty in the lead roles.

The first look of Roy and Chakraborty, along with the first poster from the film, was released on 15 April 2025, on the occasion of Poila Boisakh. Subhadeep Naskar did the cinematography while Sumit Chowdhury handled the editing. Siljait Chakraborty did the background score while Savvy composed the soundtrack. The film was released in the theatres on 6 June 2025.

== Synopsis ==
Brishti has been widowed for a year. Her sister-in-law Sapna comes to the house to attend the batsorik, the first death anniversary of Brishti's husband, Neel.

After arriving, Sapna begins to feel that something is unusual about the house. She also blames Brishti for persuading Neel to buy the property, which she believes led to his depression. The two later find an old wooden box tied with wires. It contains several disturbing paintings made by Neel. A white sheet with the word "pishach" written on it is found on top of the paintings.

The discovery frightens both of them, though they react to it differently. Sapna performs rituals and tries to contact Neel's spirit. Brishti, meanwhile, struggles with her life after Neel's death. She sees a friend getting married and faces problems at work. She eventually turns to alcohol while dealing with her difficulties.

== Cast ==
- Ritabhari Chakraborty as Brishti, a widow
- Satabdi Roy as Swapna, Brishti's sister-in-law
- Ishan Mazumder as Neel, Brishti's husband
- Joydip Kundu as a neighbour
- Aritraa Sengupta
- Alok Sanyal
- Subhrajit Datta (Special appearance)

== Marketing ==
The teaser of Batshorik was released on 12 May 2025. The trailer of the film was released on 31 May 2025. The film had its premiere at PVR INOX in South City Mall, South Kolkata.

== Reception ==
=== Critical reception ===
Poorna Banerjee of The Times of India rated the film 3.5/5 stars and wrote "Batshorik remains a strong addition to Bengali horror – rooted in relationships, richly atmospheric, and unafraid to let its women grieve, rage, and haunt in equal measure." She applauded the jump scares in deployed, the depiction of loss and unresolved grief, the slow unfolding of the emotions, the minute details employed to create a eerie atmosphere, the background score and the performance of the lead cast but bemoaned the slow pace in the second half, excessive time taken to build the haunted atmosphere, some weak dialogues and poor editing in certain scenes.

Shampali Moulik of Sangbad Pratidin reviewed the film and praised the performance of Roy and Chakraborty, Bhaumik's direction and choice of genre, the cinematography and the music but bemoaned the below par screenplay for a horror film and the lack of sufficient intensity in the climax. A critic from Aaro Ananda rated the film 3/5 stars and appreciated Bhaumik's direction and choice of genre, the cinematography, the dialogues, the songs, the chemistry between Roy and Chakraborty's characters, the climax and the screenplay but criticized Chakraborty's average dialogue delivery.

Subhadeep Banerjee of The Wall rated the film 8/10 stars and praised the performance of Roy and Chakraborty, their chemistry, the overall storyline, the atmosphere, the costume design, the lighting, the cinematography, the colour palette and the art direction but criticized the lack of Bengali touch in the film and the minute details which she mentioned could have been made more believable. Shatakshi Ganguly of IWMBuzz rated the film 2.5 out of 5 stars and opined "The tonality looked fantastic, and it gets you to the grind. The flickering of lights (a common element) everything summed up to make it a wishy-washy watchable watch." She appreciated the way grief has been portrayed in the film, the ambiguous nature of the storyline and the climax.
