= Kilvenmani massacre =

1968 massacre in Tamil Nadu, India

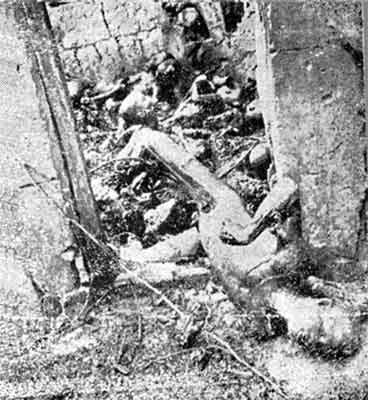
44 people burnt alive

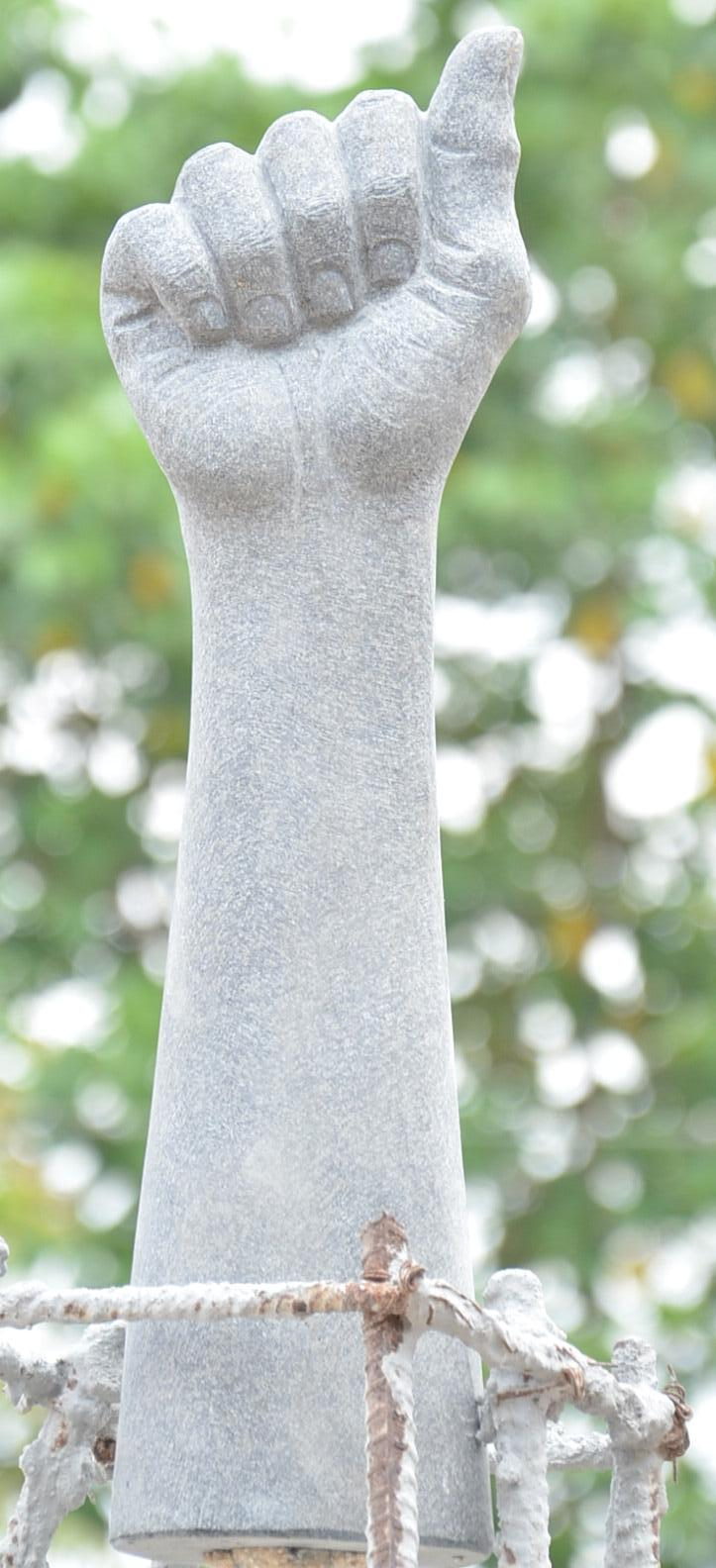
Raised fist carried as part of the 2014 inauguration of the Keezhvenmani martyrs memorial

The Kilvenmani massacre (or Keezhvenmani massacre) was an incident in Kizhavenmani village, Nagapattinam district of Tamil Nadu state in India on 25 December 1968 in which a group of around 44 people, the families of striking Dalit village labourers, were murdered by a gang, allegedly led by their landlords. The chief accused was Gopalakrishnan Naidu.

It became a notable event in left wing political campaigns of the time and in Communist ideology. The incident helped to initiate large-scale changes in the local rural economy, engendering a massive redistribution of land in the region.

== Massacre ==
The incident occurred when some poor labourers were influenced by the Communist Party of India (Marxist) to organise themselves into a campaign for higher wages following the increase in agricultural production as the result of the Green Revolution in India. The lands were controlled by powerful families, while the labourers were from a marginalized community. In 1968, the agricultural labourers of unified Tanjore district formed a union seeking better working conditions and higher wages. To mark their union the workers hoisted red flags in their villages, irking their landlords. The landlords formed a separate union with yellow flags and started laying off workers belonging to the Communist unions.

This led to tensions and finally a boycott by all labourers. The peasants withheld part of the harvest as a negotiating tactic. The Paddy Producers Association, representing the local landlords, organised external labourers to continue the harvest. Matters became fraught when a local shopkeeper who supported the protesters was kidnapped by supporters of the landlords and beaten up. Protesters attacked the kidnappers, forcing them to release their hostage. In the clash, one of the landlords' agents was killed.

According to eyewitness accounts, on 25 December 1968, at around 10 p.m., the landlords and their 200 henchmen came in lorries and surrounded the hutments, cutting off all routes of escape. The attackers shot at the labourers, mortally wounding two of them. Labourers and their families could only throw stones to protect themselves or flee from the spot. Many of the women and children, and some old men, took refuge in a hut that was 8 ft x 9 ft. But the attackers surrounded it and set fire to it, burning them to death. The fire was systematically stoked with hay and dry wood. Two children thrown out from the burning hut in the hope that they would survive were thrown back into the flames by the arsonists. Of six people who managed to come out of the burning hut, two of whom were caught, hacked to death and thrown back into the flame. Post this heinous crime, attackers went straight to the police station, demanded protection against reprisals and got it. The massacre resulted in death of 44, including 5 aged men, 16 women and 23 children.

Reacting to the carnage, the then Chief Minister C. Annadurai, sent two of his Cabinet Ministers – PWD Minister M Karunanidhi and Law Minister S. Madhavan – to the site of the incident. He also conveyed his condolences and promised action.

In the subsequent trial, the landlords were convicted of involvement in the event. Ten of them were sentenced to 10 years in jail. However, an appeal court overturned the conviction. Gopalakrishnan Naidu, leader of the Paddy Producers Association, was accused of being behind the massacre. The Madras High Court acquitted him in 1975, quashing the Nagapattinam district court judgment awarding him 10 years of imprisonment in 1970. He was murdered in a revenge attack in 1980.

== Victims ==
Names and (age) of the victims as per the documentary Ramiahvin Kudisai (The Hut of Ramiah)

| 1 | Dhamodaran (1) | 12 | Aasaithambi (10) | 23 | Ranjithamal (16) | 34 | Pappa (35) |
| 2 | Kunasekaran (1) | 13 | Jayam (10) | 24 | Aandal (20) | 35 | Rathinam (35) |
| 3 | Selvi (3) | 14 | Jothi (10) | 25 | Kanakammal (25) | 36 | Karuppayi (35) |
| 4 | Vasugi (3) | 15 | Natarajan (10) | 26 | Mathambal (25) | 37 | Murugan (40) |
| 5 | Rani (4) | 16 | Vethavalli (10) | 27 | Veerammal (25) | 38 | Srinivasan (40) |
| 6 | Natarasan (5) | 17 | Karunanidhi (12) | 28 | Sethu (26) | 39 | Anjalai (45) |
| 7 | Thangaiyan (5) | 18 | Sandra (12) | 29 | Chinnapillai (28) | 40 | Sundaram (45) |
| 8 | Vasugi (5) | 19 | Saroja (12) | 30 | Aaachiammal (30) | 41 | Pattu (46) |
| 9 | Jayam (6) | 20 | Shanmugam (13) | 31 | Kunjambal (35) | 42 | Karupayi (50) |
| 10 | Natarasan (6) | 21 | Kurusamy (15) | 32 | Kuppammal (35) | 43 | Kaveri (50) |
| 11 | Rajendran (7) | 22 | Poomayil (16) | 33 | Pakkiyam (35) | 44 | Suppan (70) |

== Aftermath ==
The massacre led widespread demand for changes in land ownership and to attitudes regarding caste. Gandhian reformer Krishnammal Jagannathan and her husband led a series of non-violent demonstrations, arguing for the redistribution of land owned by the local Hindu temple and Trust lands in Valivalam to members of the Dalit caste. The couple also founded an organisation to promote their aims. Krishnammal Jeganathan later said, on the eve of a commemoration of the massacre, "I could not sleep last night, and the sight of the violence feels fresh in my mind – fresh blood of a butchered child, and charred bodies of women and children, who had taken refuge in a hut".

Feminist activists played a significant role in making the massacre well known. Six years after the killings the first state conference of the Democratic Women's Association was held in Kizhavenmani. Mythili Sivaraman helped to publicize the atrocities through her articles and essays. A collection of her writings about the incident was released as a book named Haunted by Fire.

== Commemoration ==
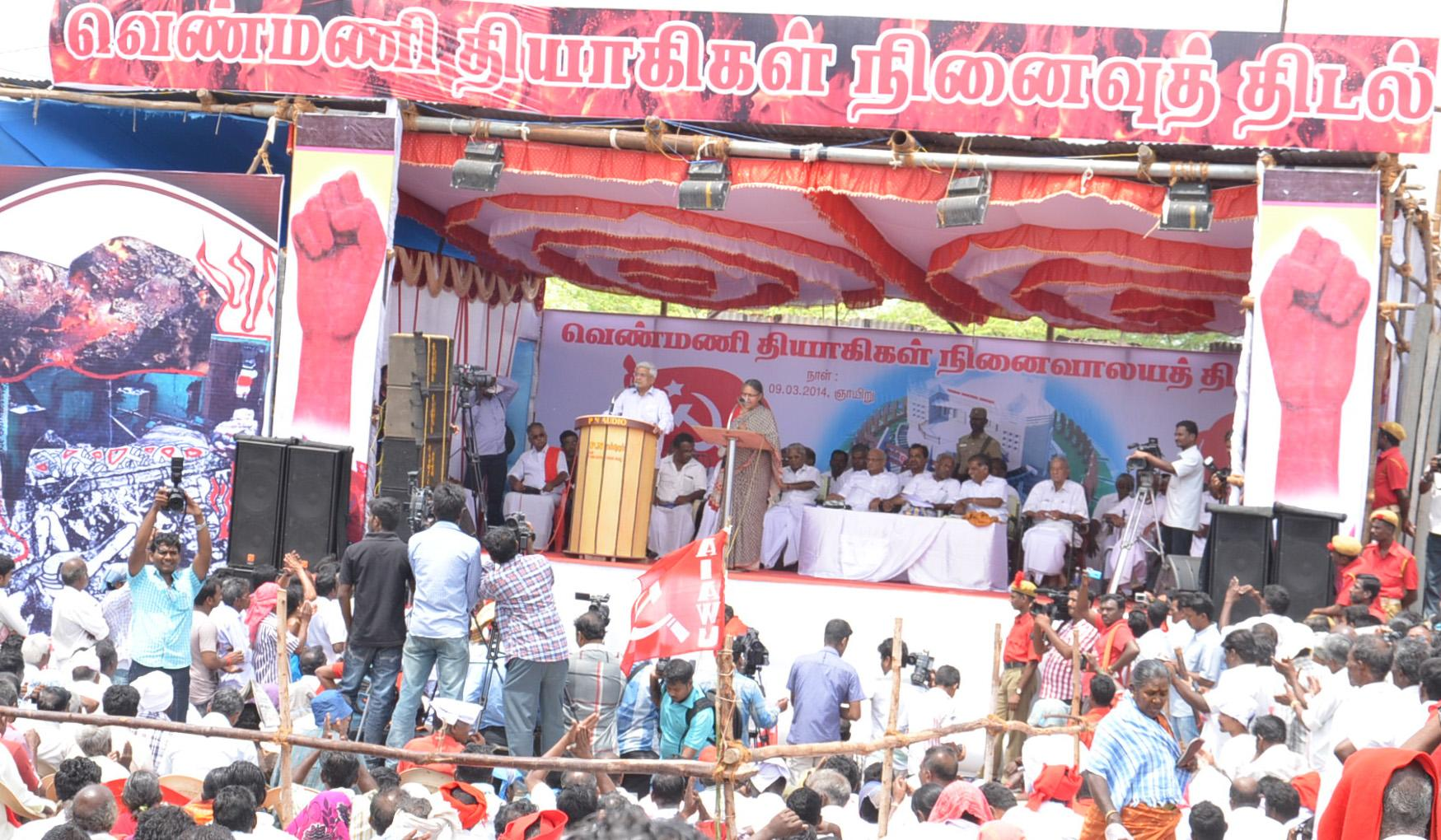
The opening of the new memorial

The Communist Party of India (Marxist) organises an annual "Venmani Martyrs Day" to commemorate the massacre. Foundation stone for memorial was laid by Jyoti Basu in 1969 when he was Deputy Chief Minister of West Bengal. The memorial was erected by the party in the form of a black granite monolith carved with the names of the forty-four victims, including fourteen victims from one family. It is topped with the hammer and sickle of the CPI(M). A plantain bud "carved out of monolithic red granite mounted on a platform serves as a memory of the dead".

Other political groups have also participated in the commemorations. The Dalit political party Viduthalai Chiruthaigal Katchi have objected to Communist control of the event. Its district secretary S. Vivekanandam said, "We also want to pay tributes to the martyrs. But the CPM does not allow us to arrange for any programmes during the anniversary saying that only their party stood in support of the farmers of Keezhvenmani. They also said that they had got the place of massacre registered in their party's name. It is unacceptable that a single party claims ownership of the historical place".

In 2006, the CPI(M) announced that it would begin the construction of a much larger memorial (referred to as "Mani Mandapam"). In 2014, the partially completed new memorial was inaugurated by the party. It comprises 44 granite pillars, representing each of the victims, surrounding a large building functioning as a museum and centre of commemoration.

== In popular culture ==
- The incident became the main background subject in the 1977 Sahitya Akademi winning novel Kurudhippunal, by Indira Parthasarathy.
- The 1983 film Kann Sivanthaal Mann Sivakkum was based on Parthasarathy's novel.
- The massacre was the main subject of the 1997 Tamil language movie Aravindhan starring Sarath Kumar, Parthiban and Nagma.
- The 2001 movie Citizen starring Ajith Kumar is loosely based on this incident.
- The 2004 movie Virumaandi starring Kamal Hasan has an epic scene highlighting this incident in the prison scene, performed by Rohini as the reporter who hails from Kilvenmani
- In a 2006 documentary film, Ramiahvin Kudisai (The Hut of Ramiah) in Chennai, survivors told their stories.
- The 2014 novel The Gypsy Goddess by Meena Kandasamy is based on this incident.
- The 2019 film Asuran starring Dhanush has references and similarity to such an incident of burning Dalit community huts.

== See also ==
- List of massacres in India
