= Kalo Chita =

2004 Bengali film

Kalo Chita (The Black Leopard) is a Bengali adventure drama film directed by Satarupa Sanyal and produced by Palchaudhury movies, based on the story Kalochitar Photograph by Samaresh Majumdar. This film was released on 10 December 2004 under the banner of SCUD Production Company.

== Plot ==
Pradip Gurung is a fearless young man. He needs 4 lakh rupees to save an orphanage. He makes a deal with an industrialist Ramsundar Chhetri and goes to a risky mission to collect rare pictures of the meeting of Kalo Chita (black leopard) in Darjeeling-Gangtok border area. Pradip meets Sujata, a young lady who leaves her house after quarreling with her elder sister. The duo goes on an adventure and is subsequently involved in a series of mysterious incidents.

== Cast ==
- Rituparna Sengupta as Sujata
- Sharad Kapoor as Pradip Gurung
- Subhasish Mukhopadhyay
- Biswajit Chakraborty
- Monami Ghosh
- Joy Badlani
- Baisakhi Marjit
- Chandan Sen
- Arindam Ganguly
