= Mahesh Mahadevan =

Background information
- Born: Mahesh Sahasranam; 27 September 1955.
- Origin: Tamil Nadu, India
- Died: 29 October 2002 (aged 47)
- Occupations: Film composer, music director

Mahesh Mahadevan was an Indian composer in the 1990s. Over the last decade of the 20th century, Mahesh composed more than 250 popular advertising jingles including the extremely popular Regaul Blue jingle. He also composed the music for six very successful multi-language motion pictures.

== Early life ==
Mahesh learnt classical guitar under Dhanraj at the age of eleven. During his college days, he was part of a band called The Versatiles. He then lost with music and went on to work as manager at Hindustan Polymers at Bombay (now Mumbai) and as deputy general manager in marketing at India Pistons at Madras (now Chennai). He returned to music in 1990 after he was affected by cancer and was going through a depressive phase. On the insistence of his wife and friends, he started writing ad jingles with Allwyn refrigerators being his first ad. It was the jingle for Regaul brand that made him hugely popular. He accepted to compose music for Nammavar before that he turned down nine films including Roja (1992).

== Personal life and death ==
In the decade before his death, Mahesh was actively involved in cancer counselling and in motivating other cancer patients to approach treatment with a positive attitude.

He died in October 2002 due to cancer.

Upon his death, The Mahesh Memorial Trust (MMT) was formed in 2002 by friends of Mahesh. MMT committed itself to building a pediatric ward at the Cancer Institute at Adyar, Chennai. The required funds were raised with the help of friends and well wishers. The trustees committed their time in overseeing the entire execution of the project from design through construction to completion.

== Career ==
Besides composing music, he handled his business and creative interests. An MBA from XLRI, Jamshedpur, he was a Director of Finance and Administration at Real Image Media Technologies. Prior to this, he worked in various capacities as a Corporate Manager in companies including Chennai based India Pistons Prvt Ltd.

== Discography ==
| Year | Film | Language | Notes |
|---|---|---|---|
| 1994 | Nammavar | Tamil | National Film Award – Special Mention |
| 1995 | Kuruthipunal | Tamil | |
| 1996 | Drohi | Telugu | |
| 1997 | Preminchukundam Raa | Telugu | |
| 1998 | Pelladi Choopistha | Telugu | |
| 1998 | Padutha Theeyaga | Telugu | |
| 2001 | Aalavandhan | Tamil | Only background score |
| 2001 | Abhay | Hindi | Only background score |
| 2001 | Moonnilonnu | Malayalam | |
| 2004 | Vaanam Vasappadum | Tamil | Mahesh's last film before his demise |
| 2004 | Kanavu Meippada Vendum | Tamil | Posthumous release |
