= B. Venkatrama Reddy =

Indian film producer (c.1944–2019)

- Born: c. 1944
- Died: 12 May 2019 (aged 75)
- Occupation: Film producer
- Relatives: B. Nagi Reddy (father)

Bommireddy Venkatrama Reddy (c. 1944 – 12 May 2019, also written as B. Venkatrami Reddy) was an Indian film producer who produced many Tamil and Telugu films.

== Biography ==
B. Venkatrama Reddy was the youngest son of B. Nagi Reddy. He produced films like Bhairava Dweepam, Sri Krishnarjuna Vijayam, Uzhaippali, Thaamirabharani, Nammavar and Veeram.

Reddy was married to B. Bharathi Reddy. They had one son and two daughters.

Reddy died on 12 May 2019 at the age of 75.

== Selected filmography ==
=== Tamil ===
- Uzhaippali (1993)
- Nammavar (1994)
- Thaamirabharani (2007)
- Padikkadavan (2009)
- Venghai (2011)
- Veeram (2014)
- Bairavaa (2017)
- Sangathamizhan (2019)

=== Telugu ===
- Brundavanam (1992)
- Bhairava Dweepam (1994)
- Sri Krishnarjuna Vijayam (1996)

== Awards ==
- He won Nandi Award for Third Best Feature Film - Bronze - Bhairava Dweepam (1994)
