= Uzhaippali =

1993 film by P. Vasu

- Theatrical release poster
- Directed by: P. Vasu
- Written by: P. Vasu
- Produced by: B. Venkatarama Reddy
- Starring: Rajinikanth; Roja
- Cinematography: M. C. Sekar
- Edited by: P. Mohanraj
- Music by: Ilaiyaraaja (songs); Karthik Raja (background score)
- Production company: Chandamama Vijaya Productions
- Distributed by: Ramana Film Distributors
- Release date: 24 June 1993
- Running time: 162 minutes
- Country: India
- Language: Tamil

Uzhaippali (pronounced [uɻaɪpaːɭi] transl. Hard worker) is a 1993 Indian Tamil-language action drama film, written and directed by P. Vasu. The film stars Rajinikanth and Roja. It was released on 24 June 1993 and was a commercial success.

== Plot ==
Tamilazhagan, a stage artist, lives a simple life with his sister's family. One day, he's approached by wealthy brothers Ragupathy, Gajapathy, and Seethapathy, asking him to pretend as Tamilarasan, a long-lost heir returned from abroad, aiming to gain control over Janaki's valuable estate. Janaki, their sister, is in a coma with no memory. Tamilazhagan agrees and takes on Tamilarasan's identity, unaware of their true intentions. But Lawyer Balasubramaniam suspects foul play and sends Pachaiyappa to investigate.

Tamilazhagan, sensing something's off, escapes the estate, seeking honest work. He becomes a loader at a factory where his brother-in-law is a supervisor, unaware that it belongs to the brothers he escaped. He clashes with Duriyodhanan, who threatens labourers, taking part of their wages. Tamilazhagan fights Duriyodhanan's goons, earning co-workers' respect. Gajapathy's daughter, Vimala, meets Tamilazhagan at a cloth store, and after a comical encounter, she falls in love with him, admiring his character. Learning he's their factory worker, she saves him from losing his job. The brothers face a deadline: find Tamilazhagan within 30 days, or the properties go to the government.

Meanwhile, Tamilazhagan helps a friend by pretending to be his rich father to aid his marriage. At the wedding, Pachaiyappa suspects Tamilazhagan, pretending as the friend's father, is the escaped Tamilarasan. Tamilazhagan escapes Pachaiyappa and the police by dressing as Shiva. While escaping, Tamilazhagan enters a house, sees Janaki's photo, and faints, reminded of his past. Balasubramaniam rescues him, suspecting he's the real Tamilarasan, Janaki's biological son. With a doctor's help, Balasubramaniam uncovers Tamilarasan's traumatic past. The greedy brothers beat Janaki, forcing young Tamilarasan to consume poison, threatening to kill her. Janaki falls mentally ill, seeing her son's fate. Ragupathy orders the disposal of Tamilarasan's corpse; Gajapathy throws him off a cliff. A young girl and her father rescue him, finding him alive. Tamilarasan loses his memory due to poison, growing up as Tamilazhagan, the girl's adopted brother.

Upon recovery, Tamilarasan learns his maternal uncles are trying to loot his rightful property. To avenge them for his mother's condition, he reenters the estate with Balasubramaniam's help. Using his Tamilazhagan identity, he gains their trust. Balasubramaniam instructs him to find his father's killer, keeping his adopted sister's family secret, citing safety concerns. Tamilarasan meets his mother, but lies about being an orphan to Ragupathy's inquiry. He hides the truth from his adopted sister and Vimala, who's shocked to see Tamilazhagan as Tamilarasan. Tamilarasan maintains the ruse, portraying himself as two individuals to earn Vimala and her cousins' trust. Vimala tactically gets Tamilarasan arrested, but with Balasubramaniam's support, he appears in two places, making Vimala believe they're different individuals.

However, Tamilarasan confesses to Vimala that he's acting as Tamilazhagan to safeguard his property and mother. Realizing the cause, Vimala joins him. As part of the plan, Tamilarasan visits the factory, shocking his adopted sister's husband and friends, who think Tamilazhagan is cheating. Tamilarasan verbally accuses his maternal uncles of looting, with Vimala shouting that they don't need his property. They tear and burn the forged factory documents, foiling the greedy brothers' scheme. Tamilarasan's cold behaviour towards his adopted sister's husband makes the family decide to leave town, but Tamilarasan stops them, revealing the truth with Balasubramaniam's help. Ragupathy suspects Tamilarasan, beating his adopted sister's family, threatening them, and learning Tamilarasan's impersonation.

Tamilarasan re-enacts his childhood trauma before Janaki, restoring her memory. She reveals her brothers killed her husband, staging it as an accident, threatening her to remain silent or kill young Tamilarasan. Learning the truth, Tamilarasan seeks revenge, asking Janaki to pretend her memory isn't cured. The maternal uncles, learning Tamilarasan's true identity, pretend ignorance, playing along. On the day of property transfer, Ragupathy reveals he's aware of Tamilarasan's impersonation, having installed bombs with Duriyodhanan's help to ruin the property. Tamilarasan rushes to save factory workers, leading to a road chase, blocked by Duriyodhanan. Tamilarasan rescues his adopted niece, who is hung from a helicopter, killing Ragupathy's and Gajapathy's sons. He fights Duriyodhanan, pushing him into the fire, stopping the bomb, and evacuating workers. The maternal uncles are arrested for their crimes.

Tamilarasan reunites with his mother and adopted sister's family, marrying Vimala. He transfers properties to his adopted sister's family, choosing to work as a labourer, satisfied with his decision.

== Cast ==
- Rajinikanth as Tamilarasan/ Tamilazhagan
- Roja as Vimala
- Radha Ravi as Ragupathy
- Vijayakumar as Tamilarasan's brother-in-law
- Goundamani as Pachaiyappa, Balasubramaniam's assistant
- Sujatha as Janaki
- S. S. Chandran as Seethapathy
- Ravichandran as Kathirvel Shanmuganathan, Tamilarasan's father (special appearance)
- Nizhalgal Ravi as Gajapathy
- Srividya as Tamilarasan's sister
- Kavitha as Manimegalai Gajapathy, Gajapathy's wife
- Sangeeta as Kausalya Ragupathy, Ragupathy's wife
- Baby Aishwarya as young Tamilarasan's sister
- Visu as Lawyer Balasubramaniam
- Charle as Tamilarasan's friend
- Vivek as Tamilarasan's friend
- Mayilsamy as Tamilarasan's friend
- Uday Prakash as Prakash, Ragupathy's son
- Puneet Issar as Duriyodhanan, a goon in the factory
- Prathapachandran as a doctor
- Chokkalinga Bhagavathar as Tamilarasan's coworker
- Madhan Bob as a cloth shop owner
- Soundararajan as a drunkard
- Samikannu as a cook
- Veeraraghavan as a judge
- Ram Lakshman as Duriyodhanan's henchmen
- Dinesh as Duriyodhanan's henchman
- Rupini (special appearance in the song "Oru Maina")
- Pallavi (special appearance in the song "Oru Maina")
- Shagufta Ali (special appearance in the song "Oru Maina")
- Viji (special appearance in the song "Uzhaippali Illatha")
- Raghava Lawrence (special appearance in the song "Uzhaippali Illatha")

== Production ==
Uzhaippali marked the comeback of Vijaya Productions who stopped producing for 20 years. This was P. Vasu's third collaboration with Rajinikanth after Panakkaran and Mannan. Unlike those films, this was not a remake, but an original story written by Vasu. Distributors issued a red card against Rajinikanth when he participated in a meeting with them and arguing about actors not slashing their salaries.

Uzhaippali was launched with a pooja at Vijaya Vauhini studio on 5 February 1993. The pooja was conducted even though the distributors were not willing to distribute the film and the Red Card against Rajinikanth was not removed.

During the shooting in Chikmagalur, the cast and crew were denied rooms in a five-star hotel because P. Vasu's manager forgot to book the rooms in advance and missed paying the booking amount, so Rajinikanth had to sleep in a car. Vasu completed the film in 58 days.

== Soundtrack ==
The soundtrack was composed by Ilaiyaraaja, and the lyrics were written by Vaali.

Track listing
No.	Title	Singer(s)	Length
1.	"Muthirai Eppodhu"	S. P. Balasubrahmanyam, Kavita Krishnamurti	4:59
2.	"Oru Kola Kili"	S. P. Balasubrahmanyam, K. S. Chithra	4:56
3.	"Oru Maina"	Mano, K. S. Chithra	5:05
4.	"Uzhaippali Illatha"	Mano	5:05
5.	"Uzhaippaliyum Naane"	S. P. Balasubrahmanyam, K. S. Chithra	5:01
6.	"Amma Amma" (Male)	S. P. Balasubrahmanyam	4:58
7.	"Amma Amma" (Female)	Sunandha	4:44
Total length:			34:48

== Release and reception ==
Uzhaippali was released on 24 June 1993. The film was much in news as distributors banned Rajinikanth films and to resolve the issue, Rajinikanth met Kamal Haasan and the next day, Uzhaippali was announced. The film was released straight in theatres without the support of distributors and become a hit by running more than 100 days. When the film was ready for release, producer was in doldrums how to release it when there is Red Card on Rajinikanth. Rajinikanth came up with an idea to distribute the film directly to theatres. Rajinikanth distributed the film in NSC through his distribution company Ramana Film Distributors. In Chennai, Uzhaippali released in Albert, Abirami, Kamala, Crown and Sri Brinda. The film opening reservation was fabulous and almost 15 days houseful in reservation. The opening report was fantastic and became talk of the town. Uzhaippali had a non-stop run for 116 days in Chennai's Albert and Abirami and 150 days in Madurai's Cine Priya. The film released in overseas too especially in Singapore and Malaysia doing decent business.

Malini Mannath of The Indian Express wrotem "Uzhaippali is a neat, unpretentious entertainer from reel one and Vasu has kept up the pace of narration without a moment's boredom". At the 14th Cinema Express Awards, S. P. Balasubrahmanyam won the Best Playback Singer award.
