= Aalavandhan =

2001 Indian film directed by Suresh Krissna

- Theatrical release poster of the Tamil version
- Directed by: Suresh Krissna
- Screenplay by: Kamal Haasan
- Based on: Dhayam by Kamal Haasan
- Produced by: Kalaipuli S. Thanu
- Starring: Kamal Haasan; Raveena Tandon; Manisha Koirala
- Cinematography: Tirru
- Visual effects by: N. Madhusudhanan
- Edited by: Kasi Viswanathan
- Music by: Songs: Shankar–Ehsaan–Loy; Background Score: Mahesh Mahadevan
- Production company: V. Creations
- Release dates: 13 November 2001 (Tamil); 14 November 2001 (Hindi)
- Running time: 178 minutes (Tamil); 177 minutes (Hindi); 122 minutes (trimmed Tamil version)
- Country: India
- Language: Tamil
- Budget: ₹25 crore

Aalavandhan (transl. He Came to Rule) is a 2001 Indian psychological action thriller film directed by Suresh Krissna and produced by Kalaipuli S. Thanu. The film features Kamal Haasan in dual roles, alongside Raveena Tandon, Manisha Koirala, Sarath Babu, Gollapudi Maruti Rao, Madurai G.S. Mani and Milind Gunaji. It is an adaptation of the 1984 novel Dhayam, written by Haasan, and incorporates elements of magical realism. The film was simultaneously shot in Tamil and Hindi, with the latter version titled Abhay (transl. Fearless), with three different actors in supporting roles. The Tamil version was dubbed into Telugu and released under the title of Hindi version.

While Aalavandhan underperformed commercially and garnered mixed reviews upon its release, it was positively received in subsequent years and achieved cult status, with some critics praising it as being ahead of its time. The film won the National Film Award for Best Special Effects and was retrospectively screened at the 2016 Fantastic Fest, where it received a standing ovation. In 2013, it was included in Rediff's list of "The 10 Best Films of Kamal Haasan." A digitally remastered but heavily trimmed version was released on 8 December 2023.

== Plot ==
Major Vijay Kumar, a Black Cat commando, leads a team to rescue tourists held hostage by terrorists in Kashmir. After the mission, Vijay meets his girlfriend, Tejaswini "Teju," a news presenter, and they plan to marry. Teju reveals she is pregnant, sharing her HCG report with Vijay. Meanwhile, Vijay decides to visit his twin brother Nanda Kumar, also known as Nandu, who has been confined to a mental asylum for murdering their stepmother, Jayanthi.

Nandu, a schizophrenic with paranoid delusions, has spent most of his life in the asylum. Despite Vijay's care for his brother, the doctor warns that Nandu poses a danger to society. Vijay and Teju visit Nandu to inform him of their wedding, but Nandu begins to perceive Teju as Jayanthi. Believing he must save Vijay, Nandu escapes the asylum after killing two inmates, Sulthan and Paasha, leaving no evidence of his whereabouts. Nandu later confronts his maternal uncle, who had a role in his incarceration, causing the man to choke and die from the shock.

Vijay and Teju marry but soon learn of Nandu's escape. Nandu's doctor initially denies the possibility but is convinced when postmortem evidence on Sulthan reveals circumcision, a trait shared by Nandu. Nandu begins his quest to kill Teju, leaving a threatening message at Vijay's home. He hallucinates his deceased mother and spirals further into violence. Nandu becomes infatuated with Sharmilee, a socialite, after seeing her posters. They meet by chance, and Sharmilee, charmed by Nandu's antics, becomes close to him. However, a drug-induced playfulness triggers Nandu's memories of Jayanthi's abuse, leading him to brutally murder Sharmilee. Regretful, Nandu burns her body but leaves evidence that helps Vijay identify him as the culprit.

Vijay and Teju retreat to his ancestral home in Ooty to escape Nandu, who secretly follows them. There, they discover Nandu's diary, revealing their troubled past. Their mother, Priya, committed suicide after learning about their father Santhosh's affair with Jayanthi, who became their stepmother. Vijay and Nandu despised Jayanthi, leading to conflicts at home. When a teacher complained about Nandu’s behavior, he blamed the toxic home environment, angering Santhosh, who punished them. Later, Vijay found out about Jayanthi's affair with another man, and Nandu’s attempt to inform their father was dismissed, resulting in a beating. The twins begged their uncle to take them away, but his illness left him unable to help. Their father decided one son must stay and, after a coin toss, Vijay went to boarding school with their uncle, while Nandu stayed behind.

The situation gets worse at home with Nandu and Jayanthi turning violent. Santhosh has another heart attack. Nandu overhears a conversation between Jayanthi and a lawyer and realises that she is only after his father's wealth. Seeing them break into a fight, Santhosh dies due to his heart attack. Nandu starts to see his deceased parents in his hallucinations, as a result of the trauma from Jayanthi's cruel antics. Nandu's mother gives him a mission of killing Jayanthi, granting him a military knife. Nandu stabs Jayanthi with the knife, but before dying, she vows to return. Nandu stays with Jayanthi's corpse in the house for days before being incarcerated at the asylum.

In the present, Nandu tracks Vijay and Teju to Ooty. Vijay learns of Nandu’s presence and manages to save Teju during an encounter. Nandu chases them, causing chaos, but Vijay pushes his car into an abyss, assuming him dead. However, Nandu survives and continues his pursuit. Vijay, with his commandos, attempts to apprehend Nandu, but he evades capture, killing several in the process.

A final confrontation ensues between the brothers. Nandu overpowers Vijay and corners Teju, who defends herself with a belt, triggering his traumatic memories of Jayanthi's punishments. Nandu visualises his mother asking him to join her as Jayanthi is torturing her up there, leading him to apologise to Vijay and Teju for his actions. To end his torment and "kill" Jayanthi, Nandu ignites gas cylinders, causing a massive explosion that kills him.

Months later, Teju is revealed to be carrying twins. She expresses concern about their children's future, fearing a traumatic childhood similar to Vijay and Nandu's. Vijay reassures her that their children will have a loving and supportive upbringing.

== Cast ==
- Kamal Haasan in dual role as:
  - Major Vijay Kumar "Vijay"
  - Nanda Kumar "Nandu" / Abhay (Hindi version)
- Raveena Tandon as Tejaswini Teju
- Manisha Koirala as Sharmilee (cameo)
- Vallabh Vyas as Dr. Srinivasa Rao (Hindi)
- Milind Gunaji as Col. Santhosh Kumar
- Sarath Babu as Tejaswini's father (Tamil)
- Navin Nischol as Tejaswini's father (Hindi)
- Smita Jaykar as Tejaswini's mother (Hindi)
- Fathima Babu as Tejaswini's mother (Tamil)
- Anu Hasan as Vijay and Nandakumar's mother
- Kitu Gidwani as Jayanthi, Vijay and Nandakumar's stepmother
- Riyaz Khan as Sulthan
- Vikram Dharma as Tito
- Major Ravi as Menon
- Poovilangu Mohan as Vijay and Nandu/Abhay's headmaster
- Yashpal Sharma as Kashmiri militant
- Mayilsamy as Theatregoer
- Madurai GS Mani as Doctor (Tamil)

== Production ==
Dhayam was a novel written by [Kamal] for a magazine long back, and it talked about a pair of twin brothers, one being an ‘animal’ (Nandhu) and the other a ‘trained animal’ (Vijay). We wanted this contrast and started off from there. The ‘animal’ had to literally look the part, and that's why Kamal sir went bald and bulked up like never before [...] The ‘trained animal’ was a dashing commando with a logical approach. Usually, most twin films fail to show the real difference between both brothers. To bring out this contrast, Kamal shot for Vijay first and then took on the Nandhu character.

— Suresh Krissna, in 2017

In the early 1980s, Kamal Haasan wrote a story titled Dhayam that was serialised in the magazine journal, Idhayam Pesugiradhu. He had discussed making the story into a film with K. Balachander during the period, but felt that the story was ahead of its time. In 2000, he picked up the story again and agreed to make the film with director Suresh Krissna, a former assistant of Balachander, and producer S. Thanu. When Thanu had agreed to produce a film for Haasan, he had initially rejected the storylines of Pammal K. Sambandam and Nala Damayanthi. This prompted the pair to begin work on Dhayam instead, and the film was revealed to be called Aalavandhan in Tamil and Abhay in Hindi. Abhay was distributed by reputed Shringar Films. Mahesh Mahadevan was signed on to compose the background music, Tirru was selected to be the cinematographer and Sameer Chanda was picked to be the art director. Actor Ravi Mohan also worked on the film as an assistant director.

The film was first announced with Haasan and Simran and Bollywood actress Rani Mukerji in a special appearance. Both actresses left the project for its delay in start, being replaced by Raveena Tandon and Manisha Koirala. Producer Dhanu had initially tried to cast Aishwarya Rai in the film, but the actress did not sign the project.

Composer Harris Jayaraj was first approached by the producer to do music for the film, and he assured to introduce him as a music composer before Minnale. But Harris refused as he owed to do his first movie with Gautham Vasudev Menon. Later, music trio Shankar–Ehsaan–Loy was signed as music composers.

The film featured Haasan in two distinct roles, for one of which he had his head shaved bald and gained ten kilograms. To play the other in the film, he went to the National Defence Academy for a crash course and also consulted his co-actor Major Ravi, who was a former officer in the Indian Army. Stunt choreographer Grant Page, who had worked in the American film It's a Mad, Mad, Mad, Mad World, was assigned to compose stunt sequences in Kashmir. Another fight sequence was shot in Delhi for 15 days using 39 cars with 3 cameras with a machine called Airramp brought from abroad for jumping scenes.

== Soundtrack ==
The soundtrack of the movie was composed by the music trio Shankar–Ehsaan–Loy making their debut in Tamil, and the film score is composed by Mahesh Mahadevan. The film features six tracks in both Tamil and Hindi versions with all lyrics written by Vairamuthu, Vaali and Javed Akhtar respectively.

The album of the film was released on 24 September 2001, and it created a record by selling over 2,00,000 copies in less than eight hours of its release. However, according to Rediff, it "did not live up to expectations."

Aalavandhan

Soundtrack album by Shankar–Ehsaan–Loy
- Released: 24 September 2001
- Recorded: 2001
- Genre: Feature film soundtrack
- Length: 27:20
- Language: Tamil
- Labels: Magnasound; Universal Music; Ayngaran Music; An Ak Audio; Saregama
- Producer: Shankar–Ehsaan–Loy

Shankar–Ehsaan–Loy chronology
Dil Chahta Hai (2001)	Aalavandhan (2001)	Yeh Kya Ho Raha Hai? (2001)

Tamil track list
No.	Title	Lyrics	Singer(s)	Length
1.	"Africa Kaattu Puli"	Vaali	Nandini Srikar	4:57
2.	"Aalavandhan"	Vairamuthu	Shankar Mahadevan	3:19
3.	"Kadavul Paadhi"	Vaali	Kamal Haasan, Nandini	3:14
4.	"Kadavul Paadhi"	Vaali	Kamal Haasan	2:41
5.	"Siri Siri"	Vairamuthu	Kamal Haasan, Mahalakshmi Iyer	6:23
6.	"Un Azhagukku"	Vairamuthu	Shankar Mahadevan, Sujatha Mohan	6:46
Total length:				27:20

Abhay

Soundtrack album by Shankar–Ehsaan–Loy
- Released: 10 October 2001
- Recorded: 2001
- Genre: Feature film soundtrack
- Length: 27:28
- Language: Hindi
- Label: T-Series
- Producer: Shankar–Ehsaan–Loy

Shankar–Ehsaan–Loy chronology
Dil Chahta Hai (2001)	Abhay (2001)	Yeh Kya Ho Raha Hai? (2001)

All tracks are written by Javed Akhtar.

Hindi track list
No.	Title	Singer(s)	Length
1.	"Zingoria (Joote Ke Chaal Liye)"	Nandini Srikar	4:58
2.	"Aa Gaya Hai Dekho Abhay"	Shankar Mahadevan	3:21
3.	"Kal Tak Mujhko Gaurav Tha"	Kamal Haasan	3:16
4.	"Hey! Who Are you"	Kamal Haasan, Manisha Koirala	2:43
5.	"Hans De Hans De"	Shankar Mahadevan, Kamal Haasan, Mahalakshmi Iyer	6:23
6.	"Koyal Se Mili Tumko"	Shankar Mahadevan, Sujatha Mohan	6:47
Total length:			27:28

All tracks are written by Vennelakanti.

Telugu track list
No.	Title	Singer(s)	Length
1.	"Andamaina Aadapuli"	Swarnalatha	4:59
2.	"Kannulalo Merupu"	S. P. Balasubrahmanyam, Sujatha Mohan	6:47
3.	"Nuvvu Evaro ! What are you !"	S. P. Balasubrahmanyam, Harini	2:42
4.	"Aggipidugai"	S. P. Balasubrahmanyam	3:20
5.	"Dhaivam Sagamai"	S. P. Balasubrahmanyam	3:16
6.	"Navu Navu"	S. P. Balasubrahmanyam, Harini	6:22
Total length:			27:26

== Release ==
Started on a budget of ₹7 crore, the costs associated with Aalavandhan tripled by the time of release. The film was released on 16 November 2001, during Diwali. The Hindi version Abhay was bought over in Maharashtra by the reputed Shringar Films. The number of prints in Tamil Nadu had been increased by almost 5 times the average. Both Aalavandhan and Abhay got A (adults only) certificate from the CBFC. Later, both were re-examined upon request to get a UA certificate.

The film was the top opener of the Diwali weekend at the box office but was not successful. According to Bollywood Hungama, Abhay collected ₹2.02 crore at the box office.

== Reception ==
Initial reviews at the time of the film's release were mixed. Malathi Rangarajan of The Hindu said, "Too much publicity can sometimes affect a film adversely, because of the great expectations triggered. In the case of Aalavandhan, the hype and hoopla built up for months seems justified — to a certain extent". Visual Dasan of Kalki praised the acting of Haasan, music, visual effects, flashback, cinematography and editing.

Reviewing the Hindi version Abhay, Taran Adarsh said, "On the whole, Abhay has nothing to offer to the masses or the classes. Poor". Rediff author R. Swaminathan said, "What happens when an exceptionally talented actor develops an inexplicable urge to delve into the dark side of the human psyche, and worse, decides to paint the town red about it? Well, for one, you get a film called Abhay."

== Awards ==
National Film Awards

- Best Special Effects – N. Madhusudhanan

Tamil Nadu State Film Awards

- Best Editor – Kasi Viswanathan

== Re-release ==
Following the film's positive response at the 2016 Fantastic Fest, a digitally restored version was announced. In April 2021, Thanu announced that he would release a re-edited version of Aalavandhan. In late January 2023, it was announced that the film would release in over 1000 screens, although no release date was provided. The film was eventually released on December 8, 2023, and besides being digitally remastered, was shorter than the original theatrical cut by around 50 minutes.

== Legacy ==
The song "Kadavul Paathi Mirugam Paathi" inspired a 2015 film of same name directed by Raaj Menon.

According to director Anurag Kashyap, the American filmmaker Quentin Tarantino told him the animated sequence in Aalavandhan inspired a similar sequence of his film Kill Bill: Volume 1 (2003).

== Bibliography ==
- Dhananjayan, G. (2014). Pride of Tamil Cinema: 1931–2013. Blue Ocean Publishers. OCLC 898765509.
