= Iravu Pookkal =

- Title card
- Directed by: Sreedhar Rajan
- Screenplay by: Sreedhar Rajan; A. L. Narayanan (dialogues)
- Starring: Sathyaraj; Nalini
- Cinematography: Soumendu Roy
- Edited by: K. R. Krishnan
- Music by: Ilaiyaraaja
- Production company: Sri Sivahari Films
- Release date: 19 September 1986
- Country: India
- Language: Tamil

Iravu Pookkal (transl. Night flowers) is a 1986 Indian Tamil-language crime thriller film directed by Sreedhar Rajan, starring Sathyaraj and Nalini. It was released on 19 September 1986.

== Cast ==
- Sathyaraj as Inspector Rajadurai
- Nalini as Meena
- Jeevitha as a girl sold into prostitution
- Anuradha as a bar dancer
- M. N. Nambiar
- Nizhalgal Ravi
- Raveendar as the deaf-mute man
- Prameela as the brothel keeper
- Y. G. Mahendran
- Thideer Kannaiah
- Calcutta Viswanathan

== Production ==
Iravu Pookkal is the second and penultimate film directed by Sreedhar Rajan. It was a rare film at a time when Sathyaraj, who was playing mostly negative roles, portrayed the lead character. The film began production with song recording at Prasad Deluxe Studios. A scene with Sathyaraj and Nalini was shot at A. R. S. Gardens.

== Soundtrack ==
The music was composed by Ilaiyaraaja, with lyrics by Gangai Amaran.

Track listing
No.	Title	Singer(s)	Length
1.	"Malli Malli Chendu"	Malaysia Vasudevan, S. Janaki	4:11
2.	"Vanji Ilankodiyae"	Malaysia Vasudevan, Gangai Amaran	4:14
3.	"Inimel Naalum Illam"	S. Janaki	4:33
4.	"Pala Raathiri Pochu"	Malaysia Vasudevan, Gangai Amaran, Vani Jairam	4:24
Total length:			17:22

== Release and reception ==
Iravu Pookkal was released on 19 September 1986. Kalki lauded the performances of Prameela and Sathyaraj, saying the director could be appreciated for sticking to the source material and not exploiting the scenes. Balumani of Anna praised acting, music, dialogues and direction.
