= Poongkothai Chandrahasan =

Sri Lankan filmmaker and activist

Poongkothai Chandrahasan (born 1980) is a Sri Lankan activist and filmmaker.

== Early life ==
She was born in Colombo, Sri Lanka, the daughter of Samuel Chelvanayakam Chandrahasan and Anne Nirmala née Naganathan. Her family moved to India in 1983, when she was three. She apprenticed under P. C. Sreeram during the making of Vaanam Vasappadum.

Chandrahasan is the granddaughter of S. J. V. Chelvanayakam, a Sri Lankan politician and leader of the Federal Party (TULF). Her maternal grandfather was Dr. E. M. V. Naganathan.

== Activist career ==
Chandrahasan works on social causes. She began working with the refugee community in 2004, and works for Organisation for Eelam Refugees' Rehabilitation (OfERR), an NGO founded by her father in 1984. She works mainly with women and children in the refugee community.

Chandrahasan organised and curated an exhibition named 'Sunshine in a Tear Drop', displaying refugee children's drawings. Five hundred refugee children (between the ages of five and fifteen) from the 117 refugee camps in India took part.

She supports homeless pet adoption and has spoken out against the pet trade. Her rescue dog Bambi appears in PETA's "Adopt a Homeless Dog" advertisements alongside movie star Trisha.

== Filmography ==
Year	Title	Role	Notes
2004	Vaanam Vasappadum	Poongothai	Also assistant director

=== Documentaries ===
Title	Notes
Refugees to the Rescue	As writer and director
Sri Lanka Struggling to Stay Afloat in the Aftermath of the Waves	As writer and director
My Island is Bleeding	As writer and director

== See also ==
- S. J. V. Chelvanayakam
- E. M. V. Naganathan
