= Utpalendu Chakrabarty =

Indian filmmaker (1948–2024)

- Born: 1948; Pabna, Rajshahi Division, East Bengal, Pakistan
- Died: 20 August 2024 (aged 76); Kolkata, West Bengal, India
- Occupation: Filmmaker
- Notable work: Chokh; Maina Tadanta
- Spouses: Indrani Chakraborty (div.); Satarupa Sanyal (sep.)
- Children: 3, including Ritabhari Chakraborty; Chitrangada Satarupa

Utpalendu Chakrabarty (1948 – 20 August 2024) was an Indian filmmaker based in Kolkata.

== Life and career ==
Chakrabarty was born in Pabna District in 1948. Utpalendu graduated from Scottish Church College, of the University of Calcutta.

Chakrabarty was involved in left-wing politics in his student life and spent time in Purulia among the tribal. Although he started out as a teacher, his passion was cinema. He made several documentaries and films. He was once married to Indrani Chakraborty and later divorced. He remarried to director and activist Satarupa Sanyal but divorced in 2000. His daughters Chitrangada Satarupa and Ritabhari Chakraborty revealed that they had no connection to Utpalendu, their biological father.

He has won the Indira Gandhi Award for Best Debut Film of a Director at the 28th National Film Awards in 1980 for Maina Tadanta, the National Film Award for Best Feature Film and Direction at the 30th National Film Awards in 1982 for Chokh, the Berlin International Film Festival OCIC Award in 1983 for Chokh and the National Film Award for Best Non-Feature Film at the 32nd National Film Awards in 1984 for Music of Satyajit Ray.

Chakrabarty died in Kolkata on 20 August 2024, at the age of 76.

== Filmography ==
=== Feature films ===
- Prasab 1994
- Chandaneer 1989
- Phaansi 1988
- Debshishu 1985
- Chokh 1983
- Maina Tadanta 1980

=== Television films ===
- Dwibachan 1989
- Sonar Chheye Dami 1989
- Rang 1989
- Bikalpa 1988
- Aparichita 1986
- Aparichita 2002
- Kalo Patharer Itikatha (Balad of the black Stone)
- Chua Chandan
- May Day 2005

=== Documentaries ===
- The Music of Satyajit Ray 1984
- Debrata Biswas 1983
- Mukti Chai 1977
- Sunilo Sagore (On The Life of Sunil Gangopadhyay)

=== Writer ===
- The Music of Satyajit Ray (Documentary) 1984
- Chokh (Screenplay / Story) 1983

=== Composer ===
- Chokh 1983

=== Music director ===
- Chhaturtha Panipather Juddha 1995

== Awards ==
- Indira Gandhi Award for Best Debut Film of a Director at the 28th National Film Awards in 1980 for Maina Tadanta
- National Film Award for Best Feature Film at the 30th National Film Awards in 1982 for Chokh
- National Film Award for Best Direction at the 30th National Film Awards in 1982 for Chokh
- Berlin International Film Festival OCIC Award in 1983 for Chokh
- National Film Award for Best Non-Feature Film at the 32nd National Film Awards in 1984 for Music of Satyajit Ray.
- Banga Bibhushan by Government of West Bengal.
