= Once Upon a Time in Kolkata =

- Theatrical release poster
- Directed by: Satarupa Sanyal
- Screenplay by: Satarupa Sanyal
- Starring: See below
- Cinematography: Shamik Talukdar
- Edited by: Dipak Mandal
- Music by: Samantak Sinha
- Production company: Akash Movies
- Release date: 3 January 2014 (Kolkata)
- Country: India
- Language: Bengali
- Budget: 115 minutes

Once Upon A Time in Kolkata is a 2014 Bengali thriller film directed by Satarupa Sanyal. The film features Ritabhari Chakraborty in the lead role.

== Plot ==
This is the story of a gangster, Arjan Panda who is highly professional. He loves and worships his wife Sreelekha like a goddess. But Sreelekha cannot accept the lifestyle of Arjun.

== Cast ==
- Ritabhari Chakraborty as Sreelekha
- Rajatava Dutta as Jiten
- Om as Arjan Panda
- Rony Chakraborty as Sayan
- Nimisha Dey Sarkar as Puja
- Sudip Mukherjee as Banerjeeda
- Dwijen Banerjee as Landlord
- Anindya Banerjee as Baptu
- deepak soni as parth
