= Ritabhari Chakraborty =

Indian Bengali film actress and producer

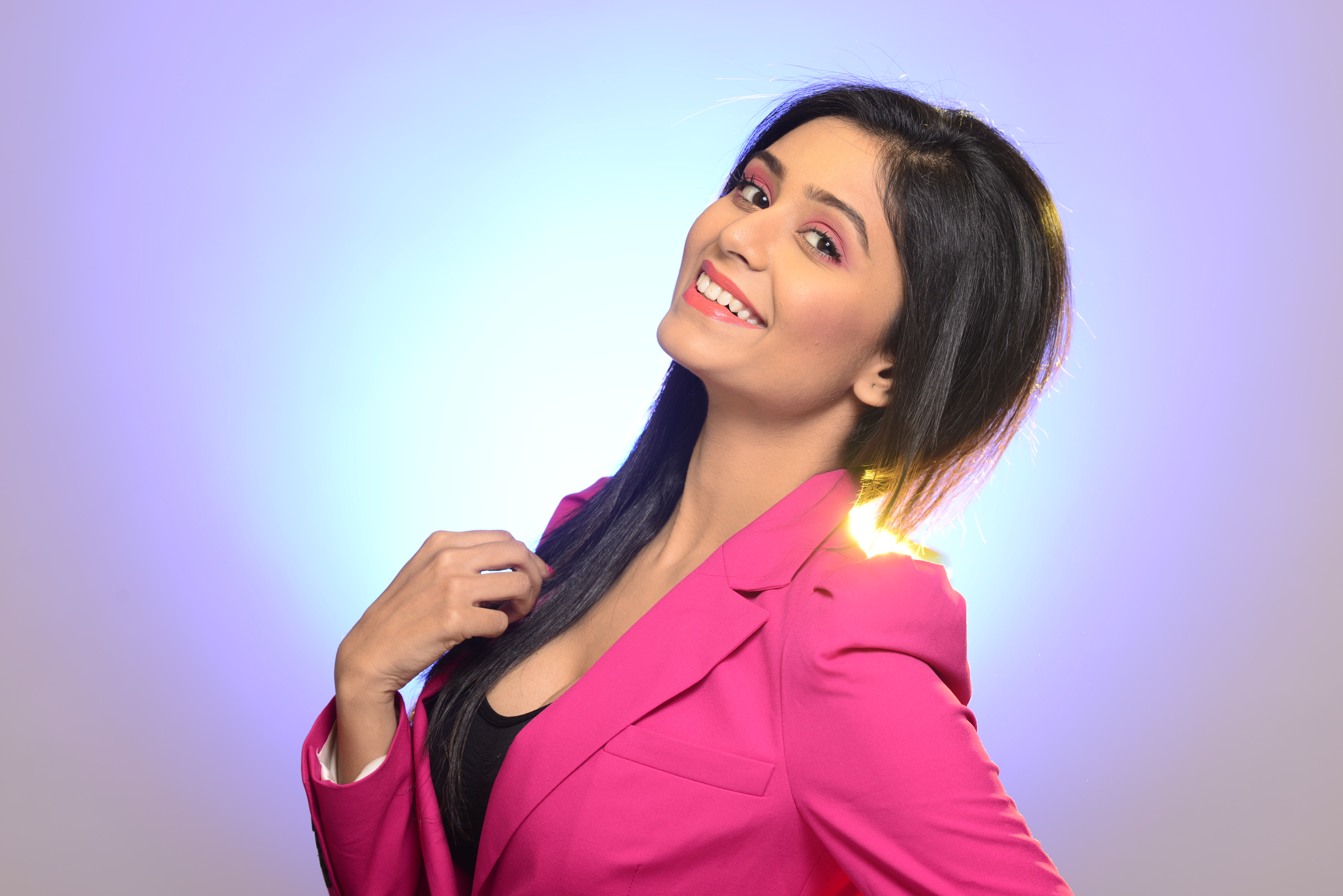
- Chakraborty in October 2021
- Born: 1993 or 1994 (age 32–33); Calcutta, West Bengal, India
- Other name: Paulin
- Education: Jadavpur University; University of California, Los Angeles
- Occupations: Actress; Producer; Singer
- Years active: 2009–present
- Known for: Ogo Bodhu Sundori (TV series)
- Parents: Utpalendu Chakrabarty (father); Satarupa Sanyal (mother)
- Website: www.ritabharic.net

Ritabhari Chakraborty is an Indian actress who works in Bengali-language films and television. She earned commercial success with the romantic thriller Shesh Theke Shuru (2019) and Brahma Janen Gopon Kommoti (2020).

She has been voted by Times of India as the Most Desirable Woman of 2018 in East as well as one of The Top 50 Most Desirable Woman of the country leaving many Bollywood actors behind. She is also the youngest producer in West Bengal. With more than 6 Million followers spread across multiple social platforms, Ritabhari was listed as one of the Most promising youth icons to use “Social media” for good conducted by Facebook. The event was moderated by the global icon Priyanka Chopra. Chakraborty is known to voice her opinions free of inhibitions and she has shared her own journey and experiences in various events like TedX, Josh Talks, and Ink Talk. She made her first appearance in television as the female protagonist of the popular Indian Bengali television show Ogo Bodhu Sundari.

== Early life ==
Chakraborty started her modelling career in when she was still in high school. She made her first appearance in television after her 10th boards examination at age 15 as the female protagonist of the popular Indian Bengali television show Ogo Bodhu Sundari. Despite working on back to back projects, Chakraborty, a high school student back then, maintained her academic standing. She went on to become an All-India national topper in 12th boards examination in History and Bengali. After completing high school, Chakraborty decided to pursue History in Jadavpur University. In 2021, Chakraborty Post-graduated from University of California, Los Angeles where she attended the UCLA Professional Program in UCLA School of Theater, Film and Television and won Acting for the Camera Pitch Competition for her multicultural drama Colors of Silence. Ritabhari Chakraborty is engaged to Famous Bollywood writer Sumit Arora.

== Career ==
=== Television & theater ===
Chakraborty started off as the female protagonist in the Bengali television show Ogo Bodhu Sundari. Owing to the show's immense success, a remake to its Hindi counterpart was also made as Sasural Genda Phool. She also played the protagonist in another television show, Chokher Tara Tui, which aired on STAR Jalsha. However, she had to quit the show prematurely due to health issues.

Chakraborty was also affiliated to the theatre group Jojok. She had played the character of Charulata (in a theatrical adaptation of Tagore's Noshtonir) directed by Gautam Halder.

=== Short films & music videos ===
In 2017, Ritabhari starred in a music video Orrey Mon alongside Ayushmann Khurrana, produced by her own production company SCUD. Orrey Mon is a Journey of a young couple trying to fulfil their dream to open a cafe together. The single was a huge success with currently over 20 million views in YouTube]. She went on to acting and producing more content with actors like Kalki Koechlin, Parambrata Chatterjee (Nykaa Tvc), Anurag Kashyap, Rajat Kapoor, Kunal Karan Kapoor (Adda song) and so on.

Ritabhari ventured into writing with the short film Naked, starring Kalki Koechlin, that she produced as well. The short film takes a swipe at the shallowness of entertainment journalism while also landing a blow for a better understanding of the forms of violence against women which includes cyber-crime as well. The short film was nominated for Filmfare. Naked garnered much of a cult fame and received number of recognitions in different cultural festivals as well. SCUD also produced Fool for Love with Anurag Kashyap, a short film featuring Ritabhari as the female protagonist. The story explores the ever relevant story of illusions of love and loneliness in life. It was released in 2019 and has won many accolades for the mind blowing performances.

=== Movies ===
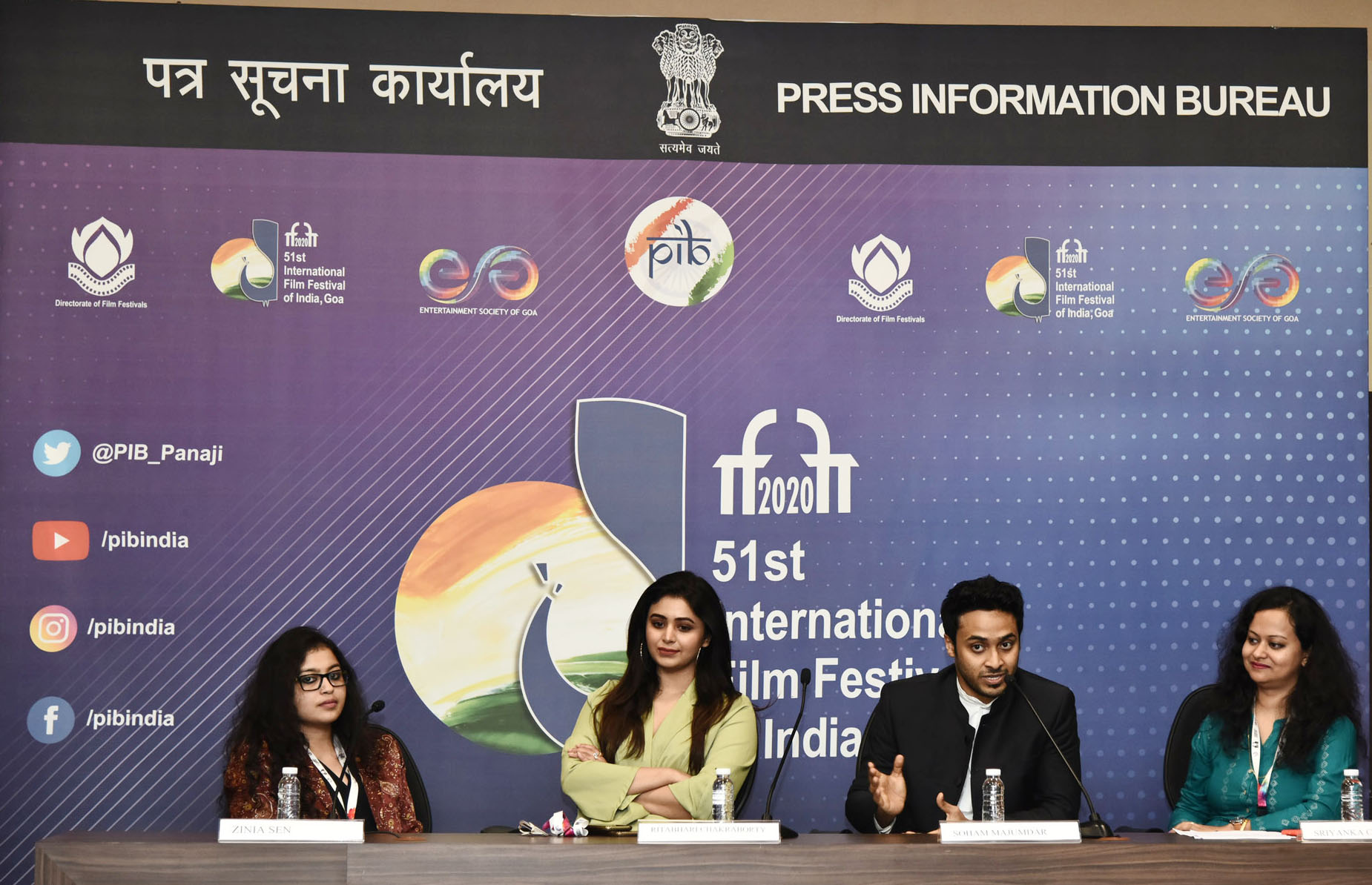
Lead cast of Bengali film ‘Brahma Janen Gopon Kommoti’ Ritabhari Chakraborty and Soham Majumdar addressing a Press Conference, during the 51st International Film Festival of India (IFFI-2021), in Panaji, Goa on 18 January 2021.

In 2011, she was set to make her big screen debut with the film Tomar Shange Praner Khela, directed by Rakesh Kumar, who had also directed Sasural Genda Phool. However, the film was later shelved. She went on working in other films like Barood and Tobu Basanta. She also appeared in Srijit Mukherji's multi starer film Chotushkone in October 2014. She was seen in an Indian Bengali drama film Bawal directed by Biswaroop Biswas. She went on to work in Onyo Apalaa in 2015 which was an official selection in Indian Panorama.

After the release of Naked in 2017, Chakraborty was cast in the Bollywood horror movie 'Pari', which featured Anushka Sharma as the lead protagonist. Her last release was Shesh Theke Shuru with Bengali star Jeet which performed average at the box office although her performance has been noticed. She made her OTT debut with Nandini. Also starring Debjani Chatterjee, Kinjal Nanda and Suhotra Mukhopadhyay, the series was streamed on Addatimes.

== Philanthropy ==
Chakraborty also runs an NGO, SCUD Society for Social Communication, which aims at providing medical camp, cultural activity and training for economic empowerment of the under privileged people. Chakraborty and her mother, Satarupa Sanyal, organise monthly health camps in rural areas of West Bengal.

== Filmography ==
| Year | Film | Role | Director | Language | Ref |
|---|---|---|---|---|---|
| 2012 | Tobuo Basanta | | Debojit Ghosh | Bengali | |
| 2014 | Chotushkone | Nandita | Srijit Mukherji | Bengali | |
| 2014 | Once Upon a Time in Kolkata | Sreelekha | Satarupa Sanyal | Bengali | |
| 2015 | Bawal | Kajal | Biswaroop Biswas | Bengali | |
| 2015 | Onyo Apalaa | | Satarupa Sanyal | Bengali | |
| 2015 | Barood | | Somik Halder | Bengali | |
| 2016 | Colkatay Columbus | Shakira | Sourav Paloodhi | Bengali | |
| 2017 | Naked (Short Film) | | Rakesh Kumar | Hindi | |
| 2018 | Pari | Piyali | Prosit Roy | Hindi | |
| 2018 | Painting Life | | Dr.Biju | Malayalam English | |
| 2018 | Fool for Love | | Satarupa Sanyal | Hindi | |
| 2018 | Shrimoti Bhayonkori | Gayeetri | Robiul Alam Robi Hoichoi Originals | Bengali | |
| 2019 | Shesh Theke Shuru | Farzana | Raj Chakraborty | Bengali | |
| 2019 | Broken Frame | | Ram Kamal Mukherjee | Hindi | |
| 2020 | Brahma Janen Gopon Kommoti | Shabari | Aritra Mukherjee | Bengali | |
| 2020 | Tiki-Taka | Bonolota | Parambrata Chattopadhyay | Bengali Hindi | |
| 2021 | FIR | Dr. Esha Chakraborty | Joydeep Mukherjee | Bengali | |
| 2023 | Fatafati | Phullora Bhaduri | Aritra Mukherjee | Bengali | |
| 2024 | Bohurupi | Pori | Shiboprosad Mukherjee and Nandita Roy | Bengali | |
| 2025 | Grihostho | Aparna Bose | Mainak Bhaumik | Bengali | |
| 2025 | Batshorik | Brishti | Mainak Bhaumik | Bengali | |
| 2025 | Papa Buka | Romila Chatterjee | Dr. Biju | Tok Pisin; English; Hindi; Bengali | |

== Television ==
| Year | Serial | Character |
|---|---|---|
| 2009 - 2010 | Ogo Bodhu Sundori | Lolita |
| 2014 | Chokher Tara Tui | Sohag / Tutul (later replaced by Ipshita Mukherjee) |

== Awards ==
| Year | Awards | Winner |
|---|---|---|
| 2010 | Star Jalsha Entertainment Awards | Best Actress |
| 2010 | Protidin Tele Somman | Best Female Debutant |
| 2014 | Uttam Kumar Kala Ratna Awards | Best Actress |
