= Nammavar =

1994 film by K. S. Sethumadhavan

- Theatrical release poster
- Directed by: K. S. Sethumadhavan
- Screenplay by: Kamal Haasan
- Story by: Kamal Haasan
- Dialogue by: Kanmani Subbu
- Produced by: B. Venkatarama Reddy
- Starring: Kamal Haasan; Gautami
- Cinematography: Madhu Ambat
- Edited by: N. P. Satish
- Music by: Mahesh Mahadevan
- Production company: Chandamama Vijaya Combines
- Release date: 2 November 1994
- Running time: 178 minutes
- Country: India
- Language: Tamil
- Budget: ₹3.7 crore
- Box office: ₹9.75 crore

Nammavar (transl. One of us) is a 1994 Indian Tamil-language drama film directed by K. S. Sethumadhavan and produced by B. Venkatarama Reddy. The film stars Kamal Haasan and Gautami, while Nagesh, Senthil, Kovai Sarala, Srividya and Karan play supporting roles. It follows a history lecturer of a college and how he tries to reform the downtrodden college through his initiatives and their consequences.

The story and screenplay were written by Haasan, and the dialogues by Kanmani Subbu. The music was composed by debutant Mahesh Mahadevan with cinematography by Madhu Ambat, and editing by N. P. Satish. The film was inspired by various English-language films about universities and professors, including To Sir, with Love (1967), Class of 1984 (1982) and The Principal (1987).

Nammavar was released on 2 November 1994, Diwali day. It won three National Film Awards: Best Feature Film in Tamil, Best Supporting Actor (Nagesh), and Special Mention (Mahesh); and two Tamil Nadu State Film Awards: Second Best Film and Special Prize (Nagesh).

== Plot ==
V. P. Selvam, a history professor from Madurai, is appointed as the vice principal of Sakthivel Arts College in Chennai, which is riddled with students' unrest and conflicts. Ramesh, the son of a major donor to the college, is a spoiled brat and campus bully who influences other students with his vulgar display of money and power. Sparks fly between Selvam, who tries to bring in some order in the college, and Ramesh, who tries to spoil it from their first interaction.

Selvam brings in multiple modern changes. Students join to paint the campus and bring in a clean look, introduce discipline in reporting time for professors and students, close the canteen during lectures and open a cultural centre for students. By adopting a different teaching technique, Selvam helps students to gain more focus.

Vasanthi, a professor at the same college, initially disapproves of Selvam's methods, but finally finds them beneficial for the students and falls in love with him despite his initial resistance. Ramesh becomes displeased with the changes and is vexed at losing control over the students who are moving to Selvam's side.

Ramesh tries to provoke Selvam, who does not respond. Ramesh injures himself and frames Selvam, which instigates the students to call for a strike. Despite many students supporting him, Selvam apologises for the sake of peace in the college. When Ramesh tries to derail the students' plan of participating in an inter-college cultural competition by destroying their musical instruments, Selvam uses the students' skills to create a cappella music and wins the competition.

After a student is hospitalised and needs blood urgently, Selvam chooses not to donate his blood, instead organising a donor. Vasanthi is disappointed at Selvam's decision and learns through his aide Perumal that Selvam has blood cancer; his days are numbered. Shocked, she resolves to marry Selvam soon. Though Selvam does not initially reciprocate, she manages to convince him. She also learns of Selvam's desire to seek answers to fight his inner demons from the past, by doing good for the college.

Ramesh is suspended from college for drug dealing. He kidnaps his former friend Vijay's (who started supporting Selvam) girlfriend Nirmala, daughter of professor Prabhakar Rao, and implicates her in a brothel case, leading to her arrest. Though Selvam bails Nirmala out, she commits suicide out of disgrace. This provokes Vijay into trying to kill Ramesh.

During the fight against Ramesh, Vijay is stabbed and Selvam comes to his rescue. Selvam is also stabbed, and people start throwing stones at Ramesh, but Selvam rescues him. Ramesh soon realises he is alone in the conflict; everyone at the college has deserted him. Selvam asks the students to forgive Ramesh and give him a second chance, which makes Ramesh repentant. Afterwards, Selvam and Vasanthi marry and leave for the United States, seeking a possible cure for the cancer, hopeful that the college will be truly reformed when they return.

== Cast ==
- Kamal Haasan as V. P. Selvam
- Gautami as Vasanthi
- Nagesh as Prabhakar Rao
- Senthil as Perumal
- Kovai Sarala as Julie
- Srividya as Selvam's sister
- Karan as Ramesh
- Delhi Ganesh as Muthukumaraswamy Pillai
- Madhan Bob as Naidu
- K. Vishnu as Muthukumaraswamy Pillai's son
- Brinda as Nirmala

The uncredited cast includes:

- Ramji as Vijay
- Santhana Bharathi as Sakthivel
- Sethu Vinayagam as Veluchamy, Ramesh's father

== Production ==
=== Development ===
Nammavar was directed by K. S. Sethumadhavan and produced by B. Venkatarama Reddy under Chandamama Vijaya Combines. While the story and screenplay were written by Kamal Haasan (who also played the lead role of Selvam), the dialogues were written by Kanmani Subbu. The film's title was chosen by Ananthu. Cinematography was handled by Madhu Ambat, editing by N. P. Satish, and art direction by B. Chalam. The film was inspired by various English-language films about universities and professors including To Sir, with Love (1967), Class of 1984 (1982), and The Principal (1987). It was the final Tamil film directed by Sethumadhavan.

=== Casting ===
Gautami was Sethumadhavan and Haasan's first choice for playing Vasanthi, and got the role. Though Nagesh, primarily a comedian, was initially hesitant to accept the role of Prabhakar Rao, he was nonetheless cast as Haasan was adamant on him acting in the film. Brinda was chosen to portray Rao's daughter Nirmala, and Nammavar was the only film she ever acted in. According to Sethumadhavan, casting Brinda was Haasan's idea. Abhishek Shankar, who later gained fame for the TV series Kolangal, was initially approached to play the antagonist Ramesh, but could not accept the offer as he was committed to another film; the role went to Karan, upon Haasan's recommendation. Vijay Sethupathi, then aged 16, had auditioned for the role of a college student, but was rejected because of his then short height, lean physique and inability to grow facial hair.

=== Filming ===
Principal photography began on 20 May 1994. The first day shoot was at held at Vijaya Vauhini Studios, with Karan and Haasan in a classroom scenario. The scene where Rao reacts to his daughter's death was filmed in one take, and Sethumadhavan chose not to say "cut" at the time. For a scene, the crew initially planned to shoot in Ooty; however they finally shot that scene by building a set resembling Ooty in Taramani and Vijaya Studios.

== Soundtrack ==
The soundtrack was composed by Mahesh Mahadevan. It was released under the label Music Master. Nammavar is the feature film debut for Mahesh, who previously composed advertising jingles. The song "Sorgam Enbathu Namakku" marked the debut of playback singer Srinivas, and was inspired by Bobby Day's "Little Bitty Pretty One".

Track listing
No.	Title	Lyrics	Singer(s)	Length
1.	"Sorgam Enbathu Namakku"	Vairamuthu	Srinivas, Swarnalatha	4:28
2.	"Ethilum Valvlan Da"	Pulamaipithan	Kamal Haasan, S. P. Balasubrahmanyam, Swarnalatha	8:21
3.	"Mannil Engum"	Pulamaipithan	Mano, Neol James	4:51
4.	"Poonnkuyil Paadinal"	Vairamuthu	S. P. Balasubrahmanyam, K. S. Chithra	5:04
5.	"Udai Oodu Pirakkavillai"	Pulamaipithan	S. P. Balasubrahmanyam, Sujatha	4:38
Total length:				27:22

== Release ==
Nammavar was released on 2 November 1994, Diwali day despite initial plans to release in January, during Pongal. Made on a budget of ₹3.7 crore, the film grossed ₹9.75 crore. The UK version was cut by 5 minutes 8 seconds, making it the most censored film classified for cinema release by the BBFC. It was later dubbed in Telugu as Professor Viswam.

=== Reception ===
Malini Mannath of The Indian Express wrote on 11 November, "The filmmaker tries to be little different, at times moving away from cliches and conclusions. But he couldn't entirely do without them either." On 14 November, K. Vijiyan of New Straits Times wrote, "With its realistic dialogue and quiet humour, Nammavar looks like a winner for Kamalhassan." Thulasi of Kalki appreciated the film for various aspects, including Sethumadhavan's direction, the cast performances and the music. On 27 November, Ananda Vikatan wrote, "Overall, with superb dialogues, beautiful camera work, impressive background score and Kamal's interesting acting enable the film to score".

=== Accolades ===
Award	Ceremony	Category	Nominee(s)	Outcome	Ref.
National Film Awards	42nd National Film Awards	National Film Award for Best Feature Film in Tamil	B. Venkatarama Reddy (Producer)	Won	
National Film Awards	42nd National Film Awards	Best Supporting Actor	Nagesh	Won	
National Film Awards	42nd National Film Awards	Special Mention	Mahesh Mahadevan (music director)	Won	
Tamil Nadu State Film Awards	1994	Best Film (Second prize)	B. Venkatarama Reddy	Won	
Tamil Nadu State Film Awards	1994	Tamil Nadu State Film Award Special Prize	Nagesh	Won	

== Legacy ==
Following the film's release, "Nammavar" became a popular nickname for Haasan among his fans. Karan's performance was considered his tour-de-force by critics, and he regards the film as a breakthrough in his career. Film historian S. Theodore Baskaran felt that Oru Thalai Ragam (1980) and Nammavar were the "two most representative Tamil films about students". In the 2021 film Master, JD (Vijay) is referred to as the student of Professor Selvam, who he considers as his inspiration and becomes alcoholic after his death.

== Bibliography ==
- "26 years of Nammavar: 26 Lesser Known facts about Kamal Haasan's landmark Film". Cinema Express. 21 October 2019.
- Dhananjayan, G. (2014). Pride of Tamil Cinema: 1931–2013. Blue Ocean Publishers. OCLC 898765509.
- Kumar, K. Naresh (1995). Indian Cinema: Ebbs and Tides. Har-Anand Publications. ISBN 9788124103449.
- Rajadhyaksha, Ashish; Willemen, Paul (1998) [1994]. Encyclopaedia of Indian Cinema. British Film Institute and Oxford University Press. ISBN 0-19-563579-5.
