= Satarupa Sanyal =

Film director (born12 November 1962)

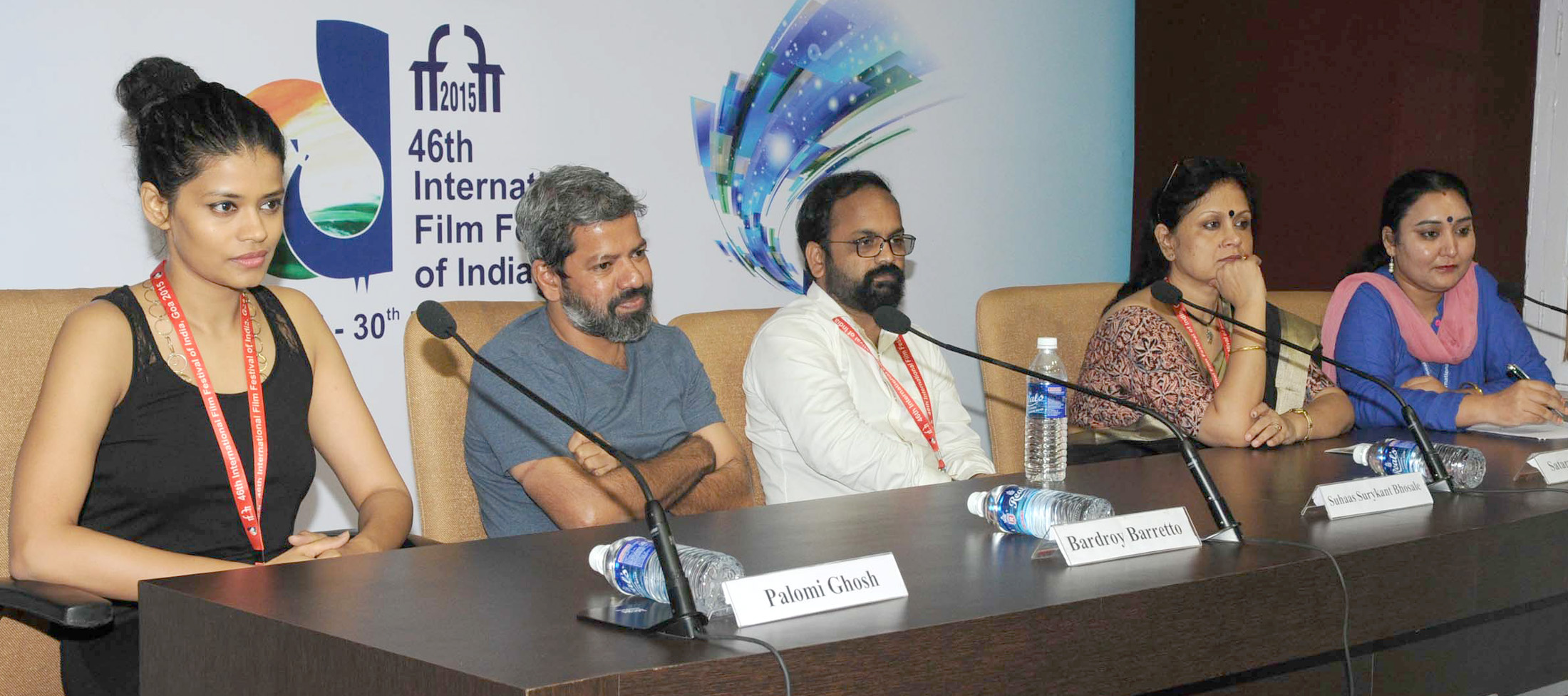
- Satarupa Sanyal (left), IFFI (2015)
- Born: 12 November 1962 (age 63)
- Education: Bidhan Chandra Krishi Vishwavidyalaya
- Occupation: Film director
- Spouse: Utpalendu Chakrabarty
- Children: Chitrangada Satarupa; Ritabhari Chakraborty

Satarupa Sanyal is an Indian film director, producer, actress, poet and social activist associated with parallel cinema.

== Early life ==
Satarupa Sanyal was born on 12 November 1962 to a middle-class family. She graduated from the Bidhan Chandra Krishi Viswavidyalaya on Veterinary Science and later enrolled in masters on Veterinary Pathology.

She started a cultural, literary little magazine Aw, while she was a student of under graduate which is still continuing till date. Her daughters Chitrangada Satarupa and Ritabhari Chakraborty are actors.

== Career ==
She was trained in Hindustani classical music and Rabindra Sangeet and performed for the All India Radio.

She acted in films since 1985. Initially she performed for Doordarshan plays and telefilms in lead roles. These include performances in Sukh, Aparichita, Uttaradhikar, Bikalpa, Sukher Jonne, Prasab and Bhanga Aiyna.

She quit acting and involved in film production. She worked as an assistant director and associated script writer to noted director Utpalendu Chakrabarty for seven years. In 1998 she made her debut film Anu as a director and producer under her own banner Scud. Till date she has directed Atatayee, Tanyabi Firti, Kalo Chita, Once Upon A Time In Kolkata, Tobuo Basanta, and Onyo Opalaa.

She has made some important short films like Fool for Love, starring Anurag Kashyap and Ritabhari, How about a Kiss, starring Rajat Kapoor and Ritabhari.

She served Central Board of Film Certification for four years as a member. She also served as a National jury member for Indian Panorama for several times, jury for the National Award for Feature Film, National Awards for All India Radio and selection committee jury in MIFF.

== Awards ==
At the 37th National Film Awards, she had won National Film Award for Best Lyrics for the film Chhandaneer.

== Filmography ==
=== Feature films ===
- Onyo Apalaa (2015)
- Once Upon a Time in Kolkata (2014)
- Tobu O Basanta (2012)
- Kalo Chita (2004)
- Tanyabi's Lake (2002)
- Atatayee (2000)
- Anu (1998).

=== Telefilms ===
- Mahesh - Akash Bangla
- Andhare Alo - Akash Bangla
- Musolmanir Golpo - Akash Bangla
- Putra Yagna - Akash Bangla
- Bhalobasar Rang - Zee Bangla
- Sei Meyeta - Doordarshan Kolkata
- Janmadatri - ETV Bangla
- Kalo Mem - ETV Bangla
- Sesh Kheyay - ETV Bangla
- Bar Bodhu - ETV Bangla
- Satyer Cheye Boro - ETV Bangla
- Dandamundo - Tara Muzik
- Jungler Chitranatya - Tara Muzik
- Waris
- Jaler Moto Soja - UNICEF
- Chetna - West Bengal State AIDS Prevention and Control Society
- Ar Bhul Noi - State Legal Services Authority
- Tahader Kotha - Govt. Of West Bengal
- Golpo Noy - Govt. of West Bengal
- Notun Swapno - Hugli jilla parishad
- Utho go Bharat Lakshmi - State legal services authority
- Bodhon
- Eksho Baro
- Kalo beral
- Kalush

=== Chakma Films ===
- Tanyabi's Lake (2005)

=== Documentaries ===
- Surer Guru - A Documentary Film of Jamini Ganguly (1985)
- Treasures of Gorumara, Govt. of West Bengal
- Jaley Jangaley Jiban, Govt. of West Bengal
- Festival & Festivities of Bengal, Central Institute of Indian Languages, Mysore
- M Madhusudan Dutta, Central Institute of Indian Languages, Mysore
- Rathyatra and Jhanpan Utsav, Central Institute of Indian Languages, Mysore
- Jiboner Jalshaghorey, documentary on Manna Dey
- " Immortal martyr Jatin Das", Films Division
- " Murshidabad the citadel of Bengal Nawabs", Films division
- " My son will not be a Chhou dancer", PSBT
- " Kabitar kalpurush Pabitra Mukhopadhyay"
- Eto Juddho Keno?
