= Padikkadavan (2009 film) =

Film by Suraj

- Theatrical release poster
- Directed by: Suraj
- Written by: Suraj
- Produced by: B. Venkatrama Reddy
- Starring: Dhanush; Tamannaah Bhatia
- Cinematography: A. Venkatesh
- Edited by: Manoj
- Music by: Mani Sharma
- Production company: Vijaya Productions
- Distributed by: Sun Pictures
- Release date: 14 January 2009
- Running time: 160 minutes
- Country: India
- Language: Tamil

Padikkadavan (transl. Illiterate) is a 2009 Indian Tamil-language action comedy film written and directed by Suraj and produced by B. Venkatarama Reddy. The film stars Dhanush and Tamannaah Bhatia in the lead roles, with Vivek, Atul Kulkarni, Suman, and Sayaji Shinde in supporting roles. The music was composed by Mani Sharma with cinematography by A. Venkatesh and editing by Manoj.

Padikkadavan was released on 14 January 2009 during Pongal festival. The film became a major commercial success, and established Dhanush as a bankable star of Tamil cinema.

== Plot ==
Radhakrishnan aka Rocky is a 25-year-old 10th grade drop-out who is looked down upon by his father Ramakrishnan because of his sharp contrast to the rest of the family, who are well-qualified in education. Rocky spends most of his time in a mechanic shop with his friends. Rocky's friends advise him to love and marry a well-educated girl so his name will be added with her name after marriage (i.e. indirectly he gets a degree after his name). He looks around by hovering around women's colleges to find a perfect girl for his mission. He succeeds in his attempt and makes Gayathri, a well-educated rich girl, fall in love with him. He starts to love her and takes her to a shopping mall where she is confronted by a group of rogues who work for Rami Reddy, a rival of her father Samarasimha Reddy, a notorious don in Andhra Pradesh who protects his daughter by destroying the gang and taking her back to Andhra from Tamil Nadu. Rocky goes to thug-for-hire Assault Arumugam to help him marry Gayathri. Rocky saves Gayathri from Rami and follows her home, where he leaarns that another Tirunelveli-based rowdy named Kasi Anandan, whose brother he accidentally kills in beginning of the film, has put a price on his head. Kasi declares that if Rocky wins him in hand-to-hand combat, he will never be disturbed by him. Rocky accepts his deal and smashes him down. The movie ends as Rocky walks out while his gang applauds for him.

== Cast ==
- Dhanush as Radhakrishnan aka Rocky
- Tamannaah Bhatia as Gayathri
- Vivek as Assault Arumugam
- Atul Kulkarni as Kashi Anandan
- Suman as Samarasimha Reddy
- Sayaji Shinde as Rami Reddiar
- Pratap Pothan as Ramakrishnan
- Mayilsamy as Mayilsamy (Mayil)
- Suman Setty as Hanumanthu
- Sendrayan as Kumaran
- Ganeshkar as Ganesh
- Meera Krishnan as Janaki Ramakrishnan
- Devadarshini as Kousalya Gowtham
- Chetan as Gowtham
- Dr. Sharmila as Kavitha
- Sashikumar Subramani as Pandi
- Kadhal Dhandapani as Veerapandi
- Santhana Bharathi as Ramalingam
- Madhan Bob as Srinivasan
- Nirosha as Andal, Srinivasan's wife
- Aarthi as Thirukaani
- Chinnaponnu as Thirukaani's mother
- Swaminathan as Malaisamy
- Pandu as Professor Sundaramurthy
- Cell Murugan as Cell Murugan
- Mahanadi Shankar as Subba Rao
- Karate Raja as Bhaskar
- Crane Manohar as Appa Rao
- Balu Anand as Shanmugam
- Bonda Mani as Bonda Mani
- Suruli Manohar as Maarimuthu
- Nellai Siva as Kothandam
- Munnar Ramesh as Samarasimha Reddy's henchman
- Cool Suresh as Veerapandi's henchman
- Shankar as tutorial college student
- Meesai Rajendranath as a man who beats up Arumugam

Cameo appearance

- Ennatha Kannaiya as Kannaiya
- Baba Bhaskar in the song "Hey Vetri Velaa"

== Production ==
The film's title was derived from a 1985 film with permission from Sri Eswari Productions, its producers. Filming began in April 2008. Vadivelu shot for the film for two days before being replaced by Vivek. A song sequence was shot in Interlaken, Switzerland.

== Soundtrack ==
The soundtrack was composed by Mani Sharma.

Track listing
No.	Title	Lyrics	Singer(s)	Length
1.	"Hey Vetri Velaa"	Pa. Vijay	Ranjith, Naveen Madhav	4:50
2.	"Hey Rosu Rosu"	Thabu Shankar	Janani Madhan (Jey), Ranjith	5:00
3.	"Raanki Rangamma"	Pa. Vijay	Udit Narayan, Malathy Lakshman	4:47
4.	"Kadavulum Kadhalum"	Snehan	Karthik, Harini, Hemachandra (Humming)	5:17
5.	"Appa Amma Vilayattu"	Snehan	Ranjith, Saindhavi	4:44
Total length:				23:27

== Critical reception ==
The Times of India wrote, "Padikathavan is worth a watch for its unadulterated masala." Rediff.com wrote, "Padikkathavan isn't meant for lovers of serious or meaningful cinema but if you're in the mood for three hours of pure entertainment, this one is your best bet." Sify wrote, "There is nothing new in director Suraaj's story which seems to have been etched out of various earlier films". The Hindu wrote, "Suraaj’s treatment allows the story to hang loose and end abruptly. The magic of the beginning is lost when the narration begins to take an entirely different route leaving the earlier part high and dry".
