= Kizhavenmani =

Kizhavenmani Keel-Venmani
- Village
- Interactive map of Kizhavenmani
- Coordinates: 10°42′36″N 79°44′04″E
- Country: India
- State: Tamil Nadu

Government
  - Type: Panchayati raj (India)
  - Body: Gram panchayat

Languages
  - Official: Tamil
- Time zone: UTC+5:30 (IST)

Kizhavenmani (also spelled Kilvenmani and Keezhvenmani) is a village in Nagapattinam district of Tamil Nadu state in India. The village is about 25 km from the district headquarters town of Nagapattinam. It is in the fertile river Cauvery Delta, known for its agrarian economy.

The village made headlines in 1968 when 44 Dalits were burnt alive by local feudal lords after being locked in a hut. The incident is known as the Kilvenmani massacre. Every year the massacre is commemorated by left wing and Dalit groups as "Venmani Martyrs Day". A large memorial was erected by the Communist Party of India (Marxist).
