= Kuruthipunal (novel) =

Novel by Indira Parthasarathy

- Author: Indira Parthasarathy
- Language: Tamil
- Genre: Revolutionary
- Publication place: India

Kuruthipunal (transl. The River of Blood) is a Tamil language novel written by Indira Parthasarathy. A revolutionary novel, it was based on the Kilvenmani massacre that took place in Thanjavur district in 1968. The novel won the Sahitya Akademi award for its author in 1977. The novel was adapted into Kann Sivanthaal Mann Sivakkum, a 1983 Tamil film, which in turn won a National Award. The novel has been translated into multiple languages including English, Hindi, Bengali, Odia, Gujarati and Malayalam.
