= Indira Parthasarathy =

Indian author and playwright

- Born: 10 July 1930 (age 96); Madras, Madras Presidency, British India (now in Chennai, Tamil Nadu, India
- Occupations: Novelist, Playwright
- Writing career
- Pen name: Ee-Paa
- Language: Tamil
- Subject: Literature
- Notable work: Kuruthi Punal
- Notable awards: Padma Shri (2010); Sahitya Akademi Award(1977); Sangeet Natak Akademi; Saraswati Samman(2004)
- Website: indiraparthasarathy.wordpress.com

R. Parthasarathy, commonly known as Indira Parthasarathy or Ee. Paa., is an Indian author and playwright who writes in Tamil. He has published 16 novels, 10 plays, anthologies of short stories, and essays. He is best known for his plays, "Aurangzeb", "Nandan Kathai" and "Ramanujar".

He has been awarded the Saraswati Samman (1999), and is the only Tamil writer to receive both the Sahitya Akademi Award (1977) and the Sangeet Natak Akademi Award (2004). He received Padma Shri in the year 2010, given by Government of India.

== Biography ==
He was born on 10 July 1930 in Chennai in a traditional Iyengar family.

He has written several short stories, plays and novels in Tamil that have been translated into several Indian and world languages.

He has carved a special niche for himself in Tamil literature - his characters, mostly urban intellectuals, speak very openly and analyze deeply what others say. Most of his novels are set in Delhi, where he lived during his working years, or in the Srirangam area of Tamil Nadu, where he spent his childhood. Some of his novels, such as Kuruthi Punal intermingle these two milieus.

He has won several awards including the Sangeeth Natak Academy, Sahitya Academy and Saraswathi Samman Award. He is the only Tamil writer to have won both the Sangeeth Natak and Sahitya Academy Award.

== Works ==
Some of Ee. Paa.'s novels are:

Thiraigalukku Appaal
Kuruthi Punal (Sahitya Academy Award-winning novel)
Aakasa Thamarai
Helicoptergal Keezhe Irangi Vittana
Mayaman Vettai
Theevukal
Yesuvin Thozhargal
Suthanthira Bhoomi
Krishna Krishna

Plays by Ee. Paa.:
Uchchi Veyyil
Porvai Porthiya Udalgal
Aurangazeb
Nandan Kathai
Ramanujar

== Works in adaptation ==
Marupakkam (1991) directed by K.S. Sethu Madhavan, is based on his novel Uchi Veyyil, and won the National Film Award for Best Feature Film.

== Awards ==
- Padma Shri (2010)
- Sahitya Akademi Award(1977)
- Sangeet Natak Akademi
- Saraswati Samman(2004)

== See also ==
- List of Sahitya Akademi Award winners for Tamil
- Lists of Padma Shri award recipients
- List of Indian writers
- List of Tamil-language writers
