= 39th National Film Awards =

1991 Indian film award

- Awarded for: Best of Indian cinema in 1991
- Awarded by: Directorate of Film Festivals
- Presented by: R. Venkataraman (President of India)
- Announced on: April 8, 1992
- Presented on: May 6, 1992
- Site: Siri Fort Auditorium, New Delhi
- Official website: dff.nic.in

Highlights
- Best Feature Film: Agantuk
- Best Non-Feature Film: Sons of Abotani: The Misings
- Best Book: Athmanindayude Pookal (Flowers of Self-Condemnation)
- Best Film Critic: Gautam Kaul
- Dadasaheb Phalke Award: Bhalji Pendharkar
- Most awards: • Agantuk • Bharatham • Dharavi (3)

The 39th National Film Awards were presented by the Directorate of Film Festivals, the organisation set up by the Indian Ministry of Information and Broadcasting, to felicitate the best of Indian Cinema released in the year 1991, with the ceremony taking place in 1992.

With the 39th National Film Awards, two new awards were introduced for the feature films section. These awards include the National Film Award for Best Special Effects and the National Film Award for Best Choreography and were awarded with Rajat Kamal (Silver Lotus). These two newly introduced awards were not given for 39th National Film Awards as no films/entries were found to be suitable.

Also, the National Film Award for Best Writing on Cinema and the National Film Award for Best Film Critic, which were until then awarded with Rajat Kamal (Silver Lotus), were awarded with Swarna Kamal (Golden Lotus).

== Awards ==
Awards were divided into feature films, non-feature films, and books written on Indian cinema.

=== Lifetime Achievement Award ===
| Name of Award | Image | Awardee(s) | Awarded As | Awards |
|---|---|---|---|---|
| Dadasaheb Phalke Award | | Bhalji Pendharkar | Film director, Film producer and screenwriter | Swarna Kamal, ₹ 100,000 and a Shawl |

=== Feature films ===
Feature films were awarded at All India as well as regional level. For 39th National Film Awards, a Bengali film, Agantuk won the National Film Award for Best Feature Film also winning the maximum number of awards (3) along with a Malayalam film, Bharatham and a Hindi film, Dharavi. Following were the awards given in each category:

==== Juries ====
A committee headed by Adoor Gopalakrishnan was appointed to evaluate the feature films awards. Following were the jury members:

- Jury Members
  - Adoor Gopalakrishnan (Chairperson) • Aamir Raza Husain • Ashish Saraf • Firooze Rangoonwala • Gummadi • Hema Chaudhary • R. Lakshman • Lalitha Ravee • Nabyendu Chatterjee • Nityananda Samntaray • P. Madhavan • Prafulla Saikia • P. R. S. Pillay • Raja Mitra • Sreekumaran Thampi • Urvashi Talwar • Vinod Nagpal

==== All India Award ====
Following were the awards given:

===== Golden Lotus Award =====
Official Name: Swarna Kamal

All the awardees are awarded with 'Golden Lotus Award (Swarna Kamal)', a certificate and cash prize.

| Name of Award | Name of Film | Language | Awardee(s) | Cash prize |
|---|---|---|---|---|
| Best Feature Film | Agantuk | Bengali | Producer: NFDC | ₹ 50,000/- |
| Best Feature Film | Agantuk | Bengali | director: Satyajit Ray | ₹ 25,000/- |
| Best Feature Film | Citation: For its masterly treatment of an unusual subject investing it with humour, suspense and drama accomplishing remarkable insight into human behaviour. | | | |
| Best Direction | Agantuk | Bengali | Satyajit Ray | ₹ 50,000/- |
| Best Direction | Citation: For the outstanding craftsmanship and the command over the language of cinema he employed in creating a remarkable cinematic experience. | | | |
| Best Debut Film of a Director | Haladhar | Assamese | Producer: Geeti Barua and Dwijen Hazorika; Director: Sanjeev Hazorika | ₹ 25,000/- Each |
| Best Debut Film of a Director | Citation: For its freshness of approach, the subtlety of its pervasive humour and the courage shown in choosing to build a film around a plough. | | | |
| Best Children's Film | Abhayam | Malayalam | Producer: Children's Film Society | ₹ 30,000/- |
| Best Children's Film | Abhayam | Malayalam | Director: Sivan | ₹ 15,000/- |
| Best Children's Film | Citation: For its outstanding qualities as a film that entertains children and adults alike. | | | |

===== Silver Lotus Award =====
Official Name: Rajat Kamal

All the awardees are awarded with 'Silver Lotus Award (Rajat Kamal)', a certificate and cash prize.

| Name of Award | Name of Film | Language | Awardee(s) | Cash prize |
|---|---|---|---|---|
| Second Best Feature Film | Firingoti | Assamese | Producer: Sailadhar Baruah and Jahnu Barua | ₹ 30,000/- |
| Second Best Feature Film | Firingoti | Assamese | Director: Jahnu Barua | ₹ 15,000/- |
| Second Best Feature Film | Citation: For its artistic excellence and for the effective use of the medium for portraying a theme of immense social relevance. | | | |
| Best Screenplay | Kadavu | Malayalam | M. T. Vasudevan Nair | ₹ 10,000/- |
| Best Screenplay | Citation: For its sensitive and poetic treatment of disillusionment of an underprivileged adolescent. | | | |
| Best Cinematography | Aadi Mimansa | Oriya | Cameraman: Apurba Kishore Bir; Laboratory Processing: Prasad Film Laboratories | ₹ 10,000/- Each |
| Best Cinematography | Citation: For achieving high degree of accomplishment in painting the film with light, imparting a sensuous quality to the texture and feel of the film. | | | |
| Best Audiography | Rukmavati Ki Haveli | Hindi | • Ajay Munjal • A. M. Padmanabhan | ₹ 10,000/- |
| Best Audiography | Citation: For the quality and effectiveness of sound in contributing to the ambience of stark oppression that pervades the film. | | | |
| Best Editing | Dharavi | Hindi | Renu Saluja | ₹ 10,000/- |
| Best Editing | Citation: For achieving right timing and rhythm, with the dexterous juxtaposition of sound and visuals. | | | |
| Best Art Direction | Rukmavati Ki Haveli | Hindi | Samir Chanda | ₹ 10,000/- |
| Best Art Direction | Citation: For creating an authentic and real setting, matching the mood and manner of the film. | | | |
| Best Music Direction | Dharavi | Hindi | Rajat Dholakia | ₹ 10,000/- |
| Best Music Direction | Citation: For using music as an integral part of the film structure, furthering the meaning and dimensions of the theme. | | | |
| Best Costume Design | Lamhe | Hindi | • Neeta Lulla • Kachins • Leena Daru | ₹ 10,000/- |
| Best Costume Design | Citation: For faithfully recreating the colour, variety and richness of the dresses worn in Rajasthan. | | | |
| Best Actor | Bharatham | Malayalam | Mohanlal | ₹ 10,000/- |
| Best Actor | Citation: For his range as an actor as well as the restraint he applied in the portrayal of the much misunderstood musician. | | | |
| Best Actress | Firingoti | Assamese | Moloya Goswami | ₹ 10,000/- |
| Best Actress | Citation: For the subtle and natural portral of a teacher who overcomes the trauma of her personal life and dedicates herself to the pursuit of a noble mission. | | | |
| Best Supporting Actor | Yagnam | Telugu | P. L. Narayana | ₹ 10,000/- |
| Best Supporting Actor | Citation: For convincing portrayal of the oppressed farmer. | | | |
| Best Supporting Actress | Yamanam | Malayalam | Santha Devi | ₹ 10,000/- |
| Best Supporting Actress | Citation: For her work in the film, who lives the role of the understanding and tormented mother. | | | |
| Best Child Artist | Bhadram Koduko | Telugu | Santhosh Reddy | ₹ 5,000/- |
| Best Child Artist | Citation: For giving a natural performance of a street-smart child. | | | |
| Best Male Playback Singer | Bharatham | Malayalam | K. J. Yesudas | ₹ 10,000/- |
| Best Male Playback Singer | Citation: For the mellifluous and masterful rendering of songs in the classical style. | | | |
| Best Female Playback Singer | Swathi Kiranam ("Aanati Neeyaraa") | Telugu | Vani Jairam | ₹ 10,000/- |
| Best Female Playback Singer | Citation: For the texture and clarity of her voice, which enlivened the classical song sung for the child prodigy. | | | |
| Best Lyrics | Mysooru Mallige | Kannada | K. S. Narasimhaswamy | ₹ 10,000/- |
| Best Lyrics | Citation: For the depth and poetic quality of the lyrics. | | | |
| Best Feature Film on National Integration | Aadi Mimansa | Oriya | Producer: Apurba Kishore Bir | ₹ 30,000/- |
| Best Feature Film on National Integration | Aadi Mimansa | Oriya | Director: Apurba Kishore Bir | ₹ 15,000/- |
| Best Feature Film on National Integration | Citation: For its strong appeal for integration and upholding of human values brought about through a remarkbly understated treatment of incidents from everyday life. | | | |
| Best Film on Family Welfare | Durga | Hindi | Producer: NFDC | ₹ 30,000/- |
| Best Film on Family Welfare | Durga | Hindi | Director: Basu Chatterjee | ₹ 15,000/- |
| Best Film on Family Welfare | Citation: For the skilful way in which the message of small family norm is communicated. | | | |
| Best Film on Other Social Issues | Yamanam | Malayalam | Producer: Ajayan Varicolil | ₹ 30,000/- |
| Best Film on Other Social Issues | Yamanam | Malayalam | Director: Bharath Gopi | ₹ 15,000/- |
| Best Film on Other Social Issues | Citation: For advocating the cause of physically handicapped and upholding their right to be on their own, in a world that is more generous with its sympathy than understanding. | | | |
| Special Jury Award | Antardhan | Bengali | Soumitra Chatterjee (Actor) | ₹ 10,000/- |
| Special Jury Award | Citation: For his outstanding screen performances, especially in the films of Satyajit Ray. | | | |
| Special Mention | Agantuk | Bengali | Mamata Shankar (Actress) | Certificate Only |
| Special Mention | Citation: For her performance as the housewife. | | | Certificate Only |
| Special Mention | Bharatham | Malayalam | Raveendran (Music director) | Certificate Only |
| Special Mention | Citation: For the quality of music composed for the song. | | | Certificate Only |

==== Regional Awards ====
The award is given to best film in the regional languages in India.

| Name of Award | Name of Film | Awardee(s) | Cash prize |
|---|---|---|---|
| Best Feature Film in Assamese | Sarothi | Producer: Bhabendra Nath Saikia | ₹ 20,000/- |
| Best Feature Film in Assamese | Sarothi | Director: Bhabendra Nath Saikia | ₹ 10,000/- |
| Best Feature Film in Assamese | Citation: For the suggestive and sympathetic portrayal of the breadwinner of a middle-class family who stands alone and isolated even in his own home. | | |
| Best Feature Film in Bengali | Antardhan | Producer: Nabakumar Chandra, Swapan Kumar Mitra and Sucheta Mitra | ₹ 20,000/- |
| Best Feature Film in Bengali | Antardhan | Director: Tapan Sinha | ₹ 10,000/- |
| Best Feature Film in Bengali | Citation: For the manner in which the suspense is built and sustained throughout the film. | | |
| Best Feature Film in Hindi | Diksha | Producer: NFDC and Doordarshan | ₹ 20,000/- |
| Best Feature Film in Hindi | Diksha | Director: Arun Kaul | ₹ 10,000/- |
| Best Feature Film in Hindi | Citation: For the impressive treatment of a relevant social theme. | | |
| Best Feature Film in Hindi | Dharavi | Producer: NFDC and Doordarshan | ₹ 20,000/- |
| Best Feature Film in Hindi | Dharavi | Director: Sudhir Mishra | ₹ 10,000/- |
| Best Feature Film in Hindi | Citation: For its affirmation of the indefatigable human spirit of survival. | | |
| Best Feature Film in Kannada | Mysooru Mallige | Producer: Srihari L. Khode | ₹ 20,000/- |
| Best Feature Film in Kannada | Mysooru Mallige | Director: T. S. Nagabharana | ₹ 10,000/- |
| Best Feature Film in Kannada | Citation: For the bold attempt in conceiving and structuring a film stringing together poems written by the Kannada poet K. S. Narasimhaswamy. | | |
| Best Feature Film in Malayalam | Kadavu | Producer: M. T. Vasudevan Nair | ₹ 20,000/- |
| Best Feature Film in Malayalam | Kadavu | Director: M. T. Vasudevan Nair | ₹ 10,000/- |
| Best Feature Film in Malayalam | Citation: For its simplicity of treatment in the delineation of rural life with a genuine feel for human values and relationships. | | |
| Best Feature Film in Oriya | Tara | Producer: Bijaya Jena | ₹ 20,000/- |
| Best Feature Film in Oriya | Tara | Director: Bijaya Jena | ₹ 10,000/- |
| Best Feature Film in Oriya | Citation: Marked by its sincerity in truthfully portraying woman's search for her identity in a male dominated society. | | |
| Best Feature Film in Tamil | Vanna Vanna Pookkal | Producer: S. Thanu | ₹ 20,000/- |
| Best Feature Film in Tamil | Vanna Vanna Pookkal | Director: Balu Mahendra | ₹ 10,000/- |
| Best Feature Film in Tamil | Citation: For the truthful and effective portrayal of juvenile romance ending in unexpected tragedy. | | |
| Best Feature Film in Telugu | Bhadram Koduko | Producer: V. Ramachandra Rao | ₹ 20,000/- |
| Best Feature Film in Telugu | Bhadram Koduko | Director: Akkineni Kutumba Rao | ₹ 10,000/- |
| Best Feature Film in Telugu | Citation: For effectively focussing attention on the need for providing protection to homeless children. | | |

=== Non-Feature Films ===
Short Films made in any Indian language and certified by the Central Board of Film Certification as a documentary/newsreel/fiction are eligible for non-feature film section.

==== Juries ====
A committee headed by Buddhadeb Dasgupta was appointed to evaluate the non-feature films awards. Following were the jury members:

- Jury Members
  - Buddhadeb Dasgupta (Chairperson) • Arun Kaul • Jag Mohan • Jehangir Chaudhary • Vijaya Mulay

==== Golden Lotus Award ====
Official Name: Swarna Kamal

All the awardees are awarded with 'Golden Lotus Award (Swarna Kamal)', a certificate and cash prize.

| Name of Award | Name of Film | Language | Awardee(s) | Cash prize |
|---|---|---|---|---|
| Best Non-Feature Film | Sons of Abotani: The Misings | Mishing | Producer: Dilip Doley; Director: Gautam Bora | ₹ 25,000/- Each |
| Best Non-Feature Film | Citation: For effectively portraying the life of tribe which lives on the banks of river Bramhaputra and its struggle to survive. The film is marked by its lyrical quality, serenity, sculpted sound and imaginative music. | | | |

==== Silver Lotus Award ====
Official Name: Rajat Kamal

All the awardees are awarded with 'Silver Lotus Award (Rajat Kamal)' and cash prize.

| Name of Award | Name of Film | Language | Awardee(s) | Cash prize |
|---|---|---|---|---|
| Best First Non-Feature Film | Kamlabai | Marathi, Hindi | Producer: Reena Mohan; Director: Reena Mohan | ₹ 10,000/- Each |
| Best First Non-Feature Film | Citation: The director has presented a sensitive and heartwarming portrait of a remarkable woman who was the first lady of the Indian screen and a versatile stage actress. | | | |
| Best Anthropological / Ethnographic Film | The Valiant Ones | English | Producer: A. K. Balakrishnan; Director: A. K. Balakrishnan | ₹ 10,000/- Each |
| Best Anthropological / Ethnographic Film | Citation: For the competently presenting the traditional lifestyle of Kodagus, the distinctive community of Coorg in Karnataka. | | | |
| Best Biographical Film | Bhavantarana | Oriya | Producer: Bombay Cinematograph Pvt. Ltd; Director: Kumar Shahani | ₹ 10,000/- Each |
| Best Biographical Film | Citation: For presenting the life and art of Guru Kelucharan Mahapatra in distinct stylised manner. | | | ₹ 10,000/- Each |
| Best Biographical Film | Kabitar Ananta Jatrapathe | Bengali | Producer: Department of Information and Cultural Affairs, Government of West Bengal; Director: Sanat Kumar Dasgupta | ₹ 10,000/- Each |
| Best Biographical Film | Citation: For imaginative visualisation of poetry of the late Jibanananda Das and relating it to his life and time. | | | ₹ 10,000/- Each |
| Best Arts / Cultural Film | Sanchari | English | Producer: Arun Khopkar; Director: Arun Khopkar | ₹ 10,000/- Each |
| Best Arts / Cultural Film | Citation: For memorable presentation of form and content of the Bharatnatyam dance through the exposition of Leela Samson's art, brilliantly synthesising dance and cinematographic language. | | | |
| Best Scientific Film | Silent Valley – An Indian Rainforest | English | Producer: Eco Media Pvt. Ltd; Director: Shekhar Dattari and Revati Mukherjee | ₹ 10,000/- Each |
| Best Scientific Film | Citation: For its painstaking and inspiring presentation of the ecological heritage and the threat to the environment. | | | |
| Best Environment / Conservation / Preservation Film | Mudialy Ekti Bikalpa Pantha (The Mudialy Alternative) | English | Producer: Dilip Kumar Roy; Director: Samiran Dutta | ₹ 10,000/- Each |
| Best Environment / Conservation / Preservation Film | Citation: For faithfully presenting people's participation in improving and conserving the environment. | | | |
| Best Promotional Film | Of Mines and Men | English | Producer: P. C. Sharma; Director: Raghu Krishna | ₹ 10,000/- Each |
| Best Promotional Film | Citation: For presenting the work of Indian Bureau of Mines in all its aspects including its concern for the environment in a competent manner. | | | |
| Best Agricultural Film | Malberiyum Pattunoolum | Malayalam | Producer: Kerala State Film Development Corporation; Director: P. P. Govindan | ₹ 10,000/- Each |
| Best Agricultural Film | Citation: For presenting sericulture through all its stages in pleasing and informative manner. | | | |
| Best Historical Reconstruction / Compilation Film | Anand Bhavan | English | Producer: V. B. Chandra; Director: Yash Chaudhary | ₹ 10,000/- Each |
| Best Historical Reconstruction / Compilation Film | Citation: For chronicling the history of the home of Nehrus in Allahabad as if told by the huge historic house in the first person. | | | |
| Best Film on Social Issues | Eyes of Stone | Hindi, Marwari | Producer: Nilita Vachani; Director: Nilita Vachani | ₹ 10,000/- Each |
| Best Film on Social Issues | Citation: For portraying with sympathy and understanding the plight of the so-called possessed women. | | | |
| Best Educational / Motivational / Instructional Film | A Story of Triumph | English | Producer: Poona District Leprosy Committee; Director: Vishram Revankar | ₹ 10,000/- Each |
| Best Educational / Motivational / Instructional Film | Citation: For portraying human triumph over the disease of leprosy through the testimony of cured and rehabilitated patients. | | | |
| Best Investigative Film | Bhagirathi Ki Pukaar | Hindi | Producer: Anwar Jamal; Director: Anwar Jamal | ₹ 10,000/- Each |
| Best Investigative Film | Citation: For the in-depth analysis of the impact of proposed Tehri Dam on the environment and the people affected by it. | | | |
| Best Animation Film | Ballu Shah | Hindi | Producer: Children's Film Society; Director: Rajesh Aggarwal; Animator: S. M. Hasan | ₹ 10,000/- Each |
| Best Animation Film | Citation: For its humorous presentation of a traditional children's story done with imaginative animation and sound. | | | |
| Best Short Fiction Film | Punaravritti | Hindi | Producer: Film and Television Institute of India; Director: Imo Singh | ₹ 10,000/- Each |
| Best Short Fiction Film | Citation: For delicating handling the loneliness and plight of an old woman who is forced to relive emotions because of her overprotective nature. | | | ₹ 10,000/- Each |
| Best Short Fiction Film | Totanama | Hindi | Producer: Vikas Satwalekar; Director: Chandita Mukherjee | ₹ 10,000/- Each |
| Best Short Fiction Film | Citation: For its traditional style, narrative structure and good production values. | | | ₹ 10,000/- Each |
| Best Film on Family Welfare | A Matter of Motherhood | English | Producer: Rajiv Mehrotra; Director: Rajiv Mehrotra | ₹ 10,000/- Each |
| Best Film on Family Welfare | Citation: For its competent attempt to educate the people, especially in the rural areas, on various aspects of motherhood in the prevailing atmosphere of traditional beliefs. | | | |
| Best Cinematography | Silent Valley – An Indian Rainforest | English | Cameraman: Shekar Dattari; Laboratory Processing: Prasad Film Laboratories | ₹ 10,000/- Each |
| Best Cinematography | Citation: For the arduous and patient coverage of the flora and fauna of the Silent Valley in Kerala over a period of one-and-a-half years and for giving an intimate portrait of the environment, recorded under difficult conditions. | | | |
| Best Audiography | Sons of Abotani: The Misings | Mishing | Anil Tendulkar and Gautam Bora | ₹ 10,000/- |
| Best Audiography | Citation: For the selective and imaginative use of commentary and dialogues and the sculpted sound which enriches the film. | | | |
| Best Editing | Sanchari | English | Rajesh Parmar | ₹ 10,000/- |
| Best Editing | Citation: For his work, which beautifully creates a structure that responds to the rhythms of the dance. | | | |
| Special Jury Award | Meitei Pung | English | Aribam Syam Sharma (director) | ₹ 5,000/- |
| Special Jury Award | Citation: For sensitively depicting the role that Pung, the traditional drum, plays in the Sankirtana and social life of Manipur. | | | |
| Special Jury Award | Akruti | | B. Narsing Rao (Director) | ₹ 5,000/- |
| Special Jury Award | Citation: For experimentation with forms of boulders of various shapes and textures, brilliantly visualised by A. K. Bir with the evocative music of Pandit Hari Prasad Chaurasia. | | | |
| Special Mention | Living on the Junk | English | Debal Basu (Director) | Certificate Only |
| Special Mention | Citation: For his work in directing the film. The film is a sincere maiden effort in focussing attention on the significant contribution of ragpickers of a metropolis in minimising the treat to the environment from the junk of a consumerist society. | | | |

=== Best Writing on Cinema ===
The awards aim at encouraging study and appreciation of cinema as an art form and dissemination of information and critical appreciation of this art-form through publication of books, articles, reviews etc.

==== Juries ====
A committee headed by Kamleshwar was appointed to evaluate the writing on Indian cinema. Following were the jury members:

- Jury Members
  - Kamleshwar (Chairperson) • Shanta Sarbjeet Singh • Vijay Sasnur

==== Golden Lotus Award ====
Official Name: Swarna Kamal

All the awardees are awarded with 'Golden Lotus Award (Swarna Kamal)' and cash prize.

| Name of Award | Name of Book | Language | Awardee(s) | Cash prize |
|---|---|---|---|---|
| Best Book on Cinema | Athmanindayude Pookal (Flowers of Self-Condemnation) | Malayalam | Author: Aravindan Vallachira; Publisher: V. R. Pushpakaran | ₹ 10,000/- Each |
| Best Book on Cinema | Citation: For critical analysis of M. T. Vasudevan Nair's film. The book is an in-depth study of the complexity of human values and the interaction between social institutions and the individual. | | | |
| Best Film Critic | | | Gautam Kaul | ₹ 10,000/- |
| Best Film Critic | Citation: For the clarity and consistency with which he has written on a wide range of issues, creating a better understanding of cinema as a creative medium. | | | |

=== Awards not given ===
Following were the awards not given as no film was found to be suitable for the award:

- Best Popular Film Providing Wholesome Entertainment
- Best Film on Environment Conservation/Preservation
- Best Feature Film in Manipuri
- Best Feature Film in Marathi
- Best Feature Film in Punjabi
- Best Feature Film in English
- Best Non-Feature Film Direction
- Best Exploration / Adventure Film
