= Subhas Chandra =

1966 Bengali film

- Directed by: Pijush Basu
- Produced by: Ajit Kumar Banerjee
- Starring: Amar Dutta
- Release date: 1966
- Country: India
- Language: Bengali

Subhas Chandra is an Indian Bengali-language biographical film, directed by Pijush Basu and produced by Ajit Kumar Banerjee based on the life of Netaji Subhas Chandra Bose. This film was released in 1966 and won Nargis Dutt Award for Best Feature Film on National Integration at the 14th National Film Awards in 1967.

== Cast ==
- Amar Dutta as Subhash Chandra Bose
- Dilip Roy
- Samar Chatterjee
- Ashish Ghosh as young subhas
- Shiben Bandyopadhyay
- Robin Banerjee
- Minati Chakraborty
- Rishi Banerjee
