= National Film Award for Best Actor in a Leading Role =

State-instituted annual film awards in India

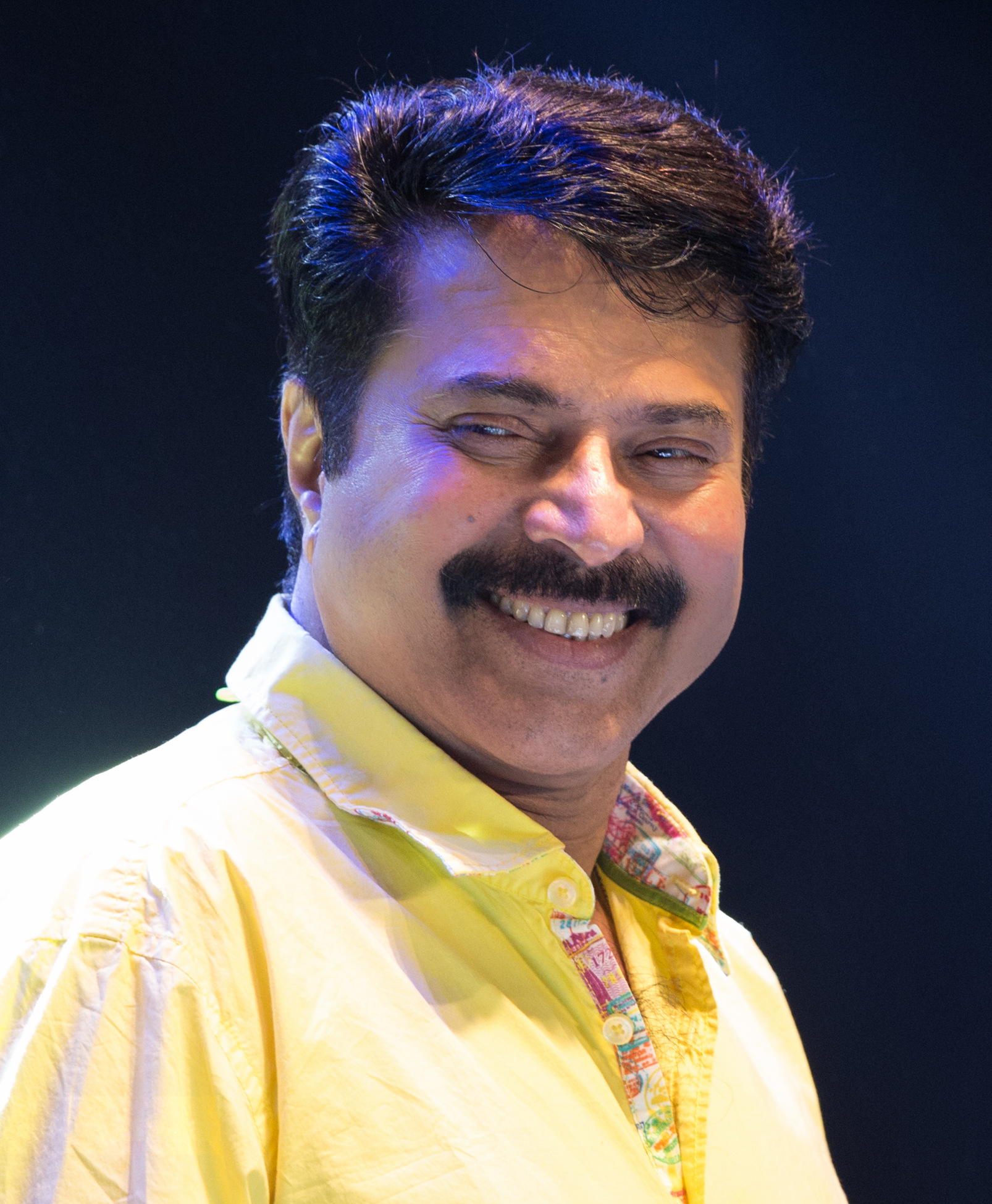
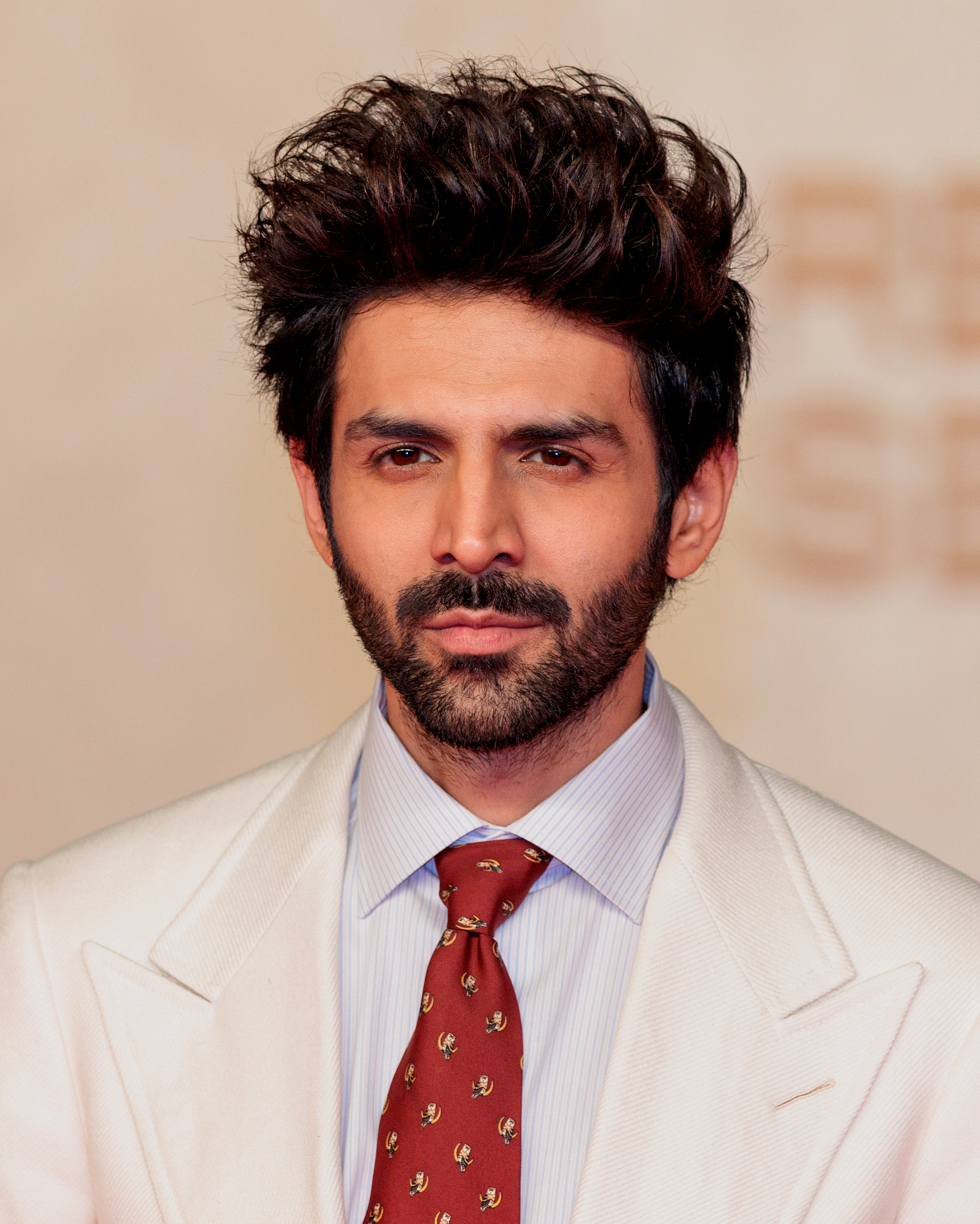
- The 2026 recipients: Mammootty and Kartik Aaryan
- Awarded for: Best performance by an actor in a leading role
- Sponsored by: National Film Development Corporation of India
- Formerly called: Bharat Award (1968–1974); National Film Award for Best Actor (1975–2021)
- Rewards: Rajat Kamal (Silver Lotus); ₹2,00,000
- First award: 1967
- Most recent winner: Mammootty, Bramayugam and; Kartik Aaryan, Chandu Champion; (2024)

Highlights
- Most wins: Mammootty & Amitabh Bachchan (4)

The National Film Award for Best Actor in a Leading Role is an honour presented annually at the National Film Awards of India instituted since 1967 to actors who have delivered the best performance in a leading role within the Indian film industry. Called the "State Awards for Films" when established in 1954, the National Film Awards ceremony is older than the Directorate of Film Festivals. The State Awards instituted the individual award in 1968 as the "Bharat Award for the Best Actor"; in 1975, it was renamed as the "Rajat Kamal Award for the Best Actor". As of 2024, accounting for ties and repeat winners, the Government of India has presented a total of 64 "Best Actor" awards to 49 actors. Until 1974, winners of the National Film Award received a figurine and certificate; since 1975, they have been awarded with a "Rajat Kamal" (silver lotus), certificate and a cash prize. (Note: Until 69th National Film Awards (2021), the cash prize is ₹50,000.) Since the 70th National Film Awards, the name was changed to "National Film Award for Best Actor in a Leading Role".

Although the Indian film industry produces films in around 20 languages and dialects, the actors whose performances have won awards have worked in eight major languages: Hindi (twenty-eight awards), Malayalam (fourteen awards), Tamil (nine awards), Bengali (five awards), Kannada (four awards), Marathi (three awards), English (two awards), and Telugu (one award).

The first recipient was Uttam Kumar from Bengali cinema, who was honoured at the 15th National Film Awards in 1967 for his performances in Anthony Firingee and Chiriyakhana. He was also the first actor who won this award for two different films in the same year. As of 2024 edition, Mammootty and Amitabh Bachchan are the most honoured actors with four awards. Kamal Haasan, and Ajay Devgn with three awards, while six actors—Mohanlal, Mithun Chakraborty, Sanjeev Kumar, Om Puri, Naseeruddin Shah and Dhanush—have won the award two times. Two actors have achieved the honour for performing in two languages—Mithun Chakraborty (Hindi and Bengali) and Mammootty (Malayalam and English). The most recent recipients were Mammootty and Kartik Aaryan who were honoured at the 72nd National Film Awards for their performances in Bramayugam and Chandu Champion respectively.

== Key ==
Symbol	Meaning
Year	Indicates the year in which the film was censored by the Central Board of Film Certification (CBFC)
†	Indicates a joint award for that year
‡	Indicates that the winner won the award for two performances in that year

== Superlatives ==
Win	Recipients
4	Mammootty, Amitabh Bachchan
3	Kamal Haasan, Ajay Devgn
2	Om Puri, Naseeruddin Shah, Mithun Chakraborty, Sanjeev Kumar, Mohanlal, Dhanush

== Recipients ==
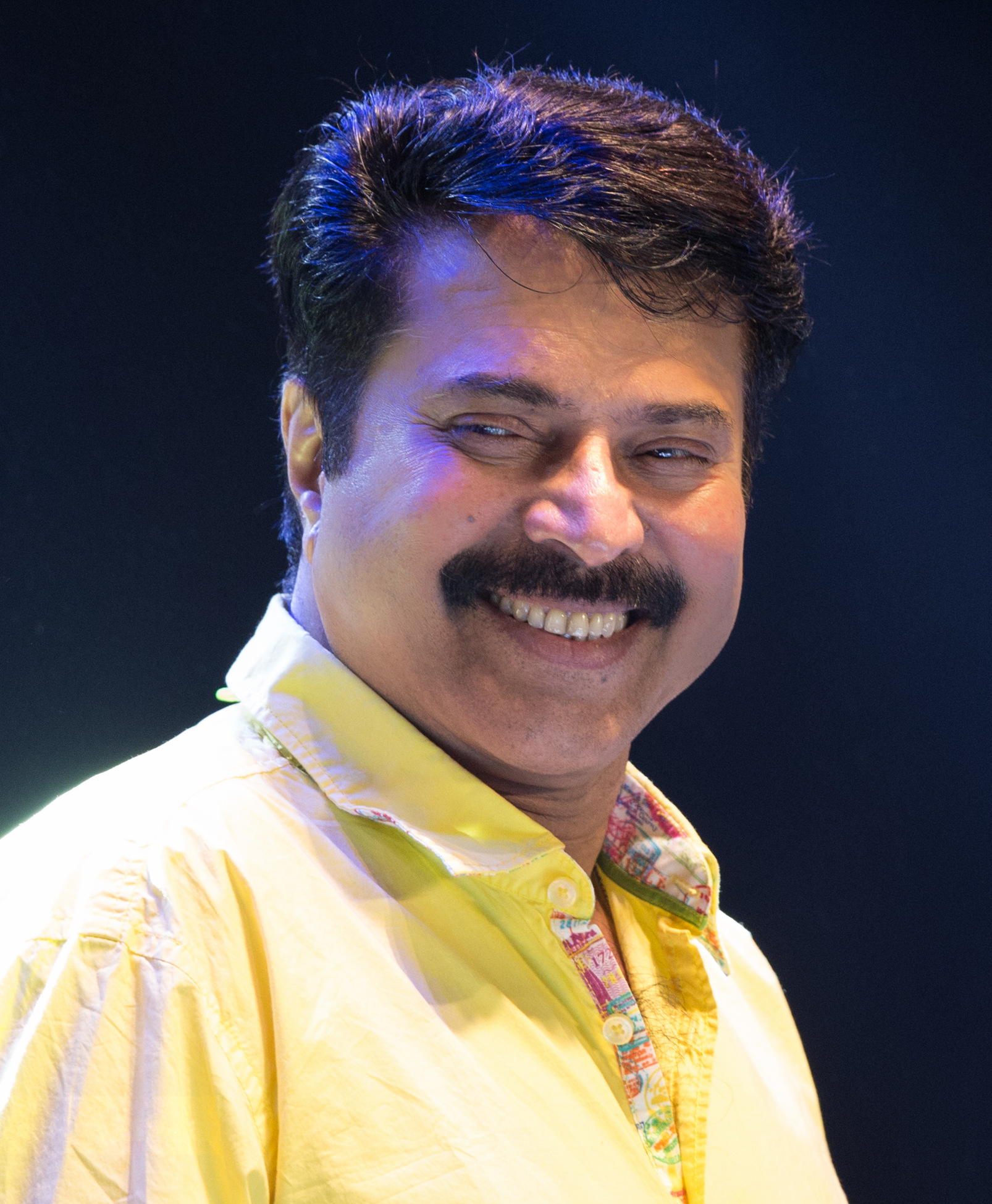
Mammootty is a four time winner.

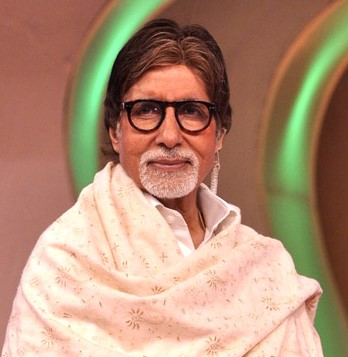
Amitabh Bachchan is a four time winner.

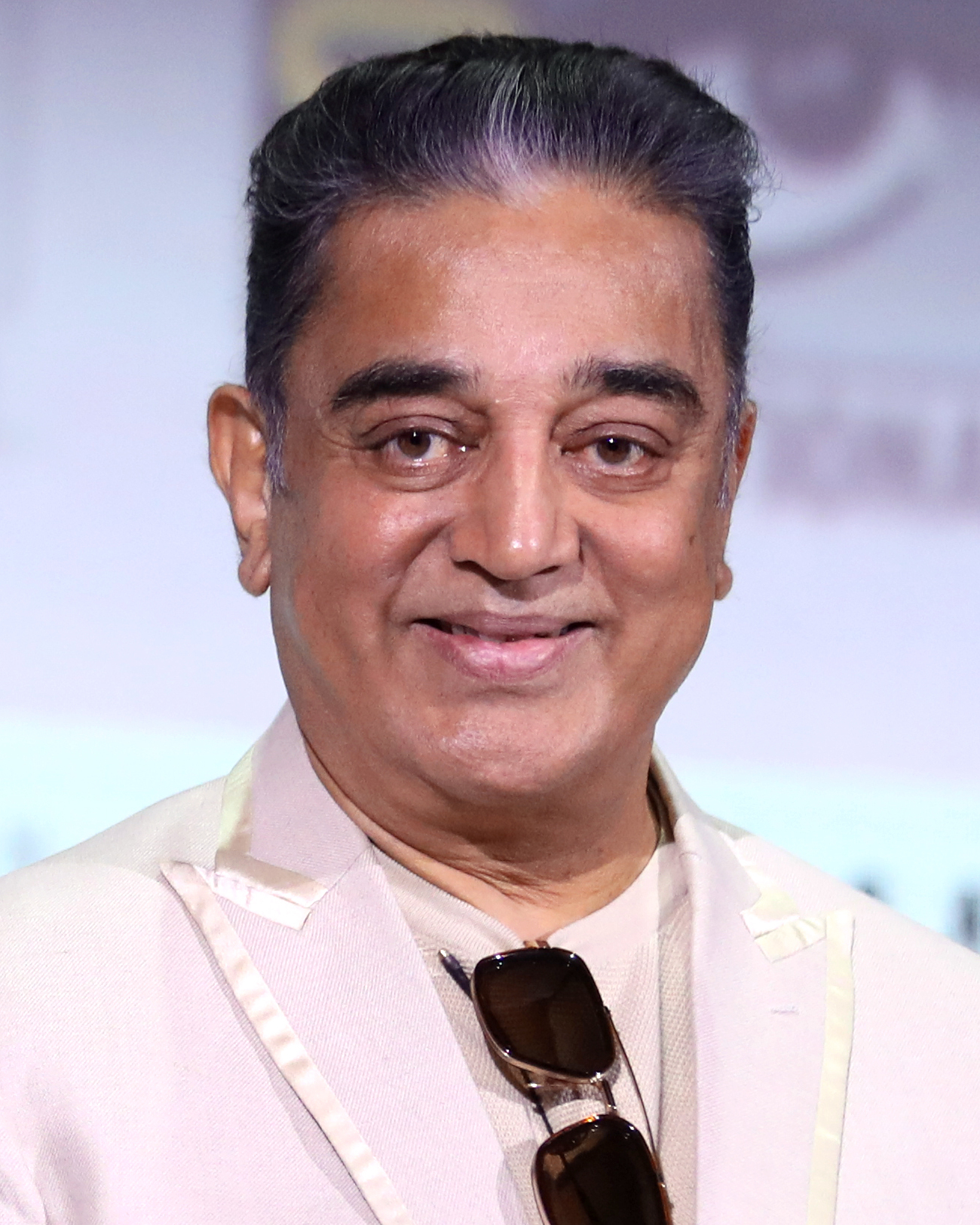
Kamal Haasan (win the honour thrice)

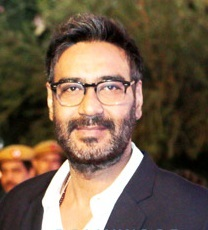
Ajay Devgn (win the honour thrice)

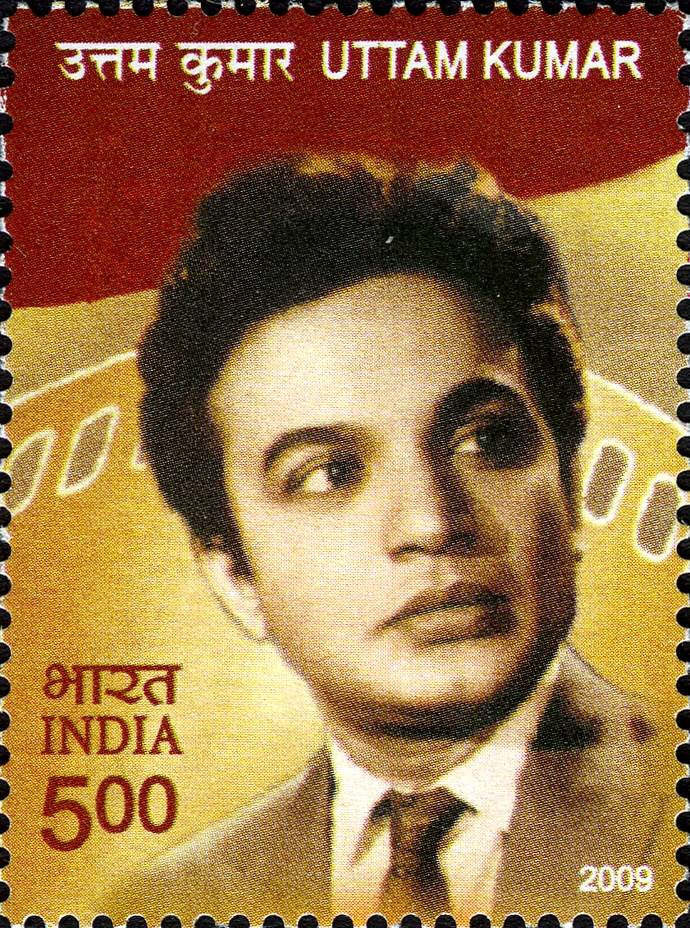
Uttam Kumar (The first-ever recipient of the Best Actor Award for his performances in Antony Firingee and Chiriyakhana in 1967.)

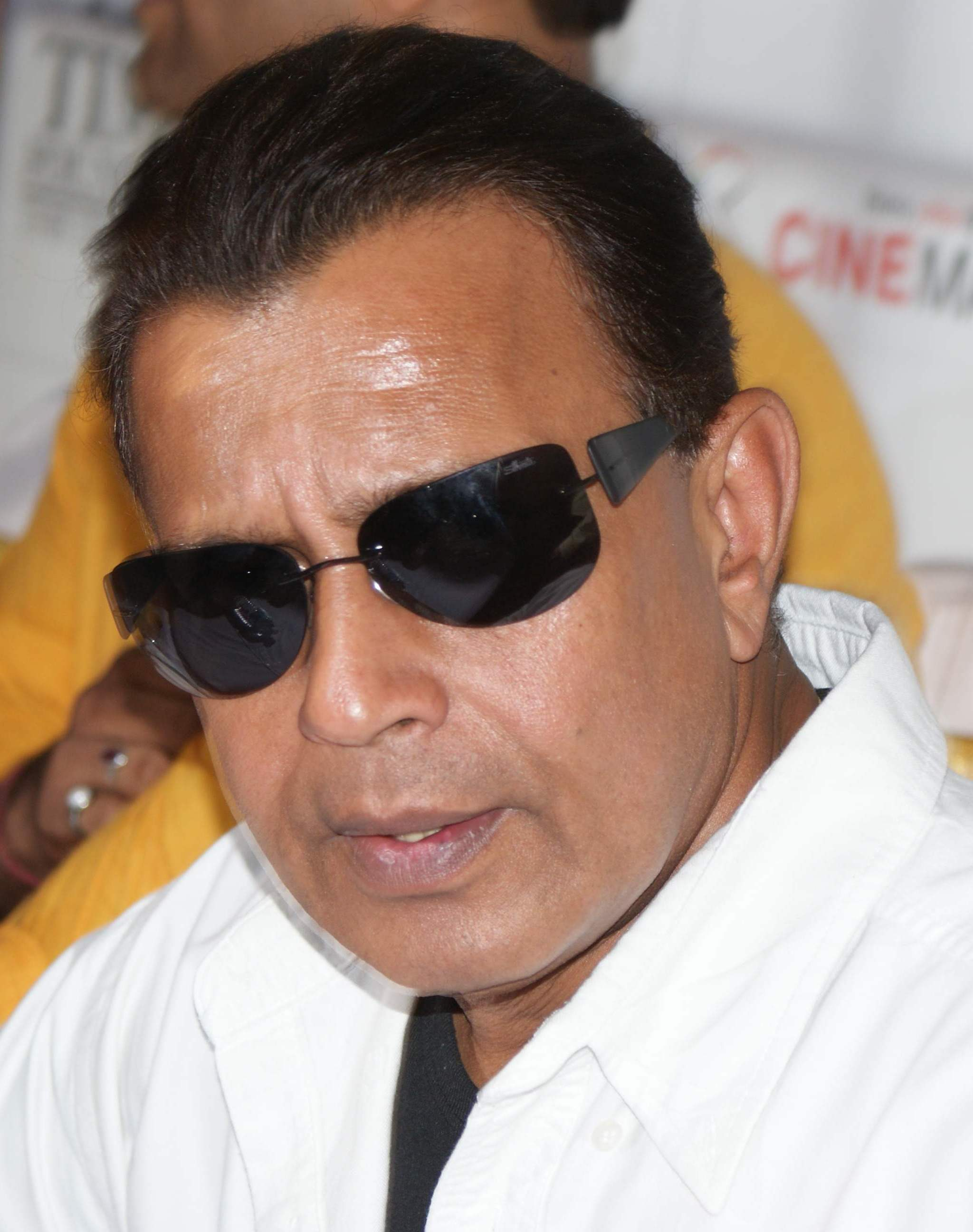
Mithun Chakraborty was awarded for his debut film.

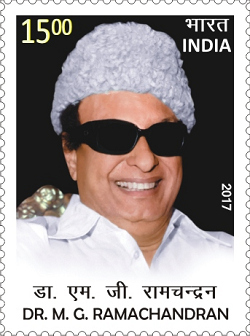
M. G. Ramachandran, former chief minister of Tamil Nadu won the award for his performance in Rickshawkaran in 1971.

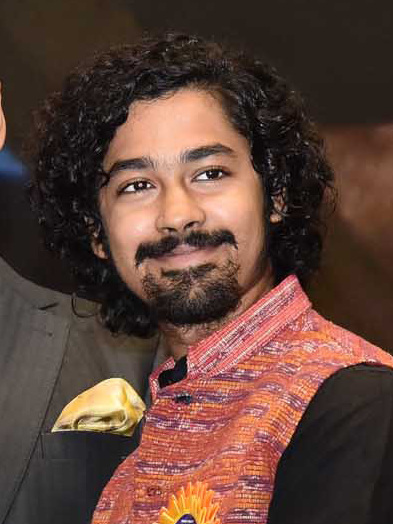
Riddhi Sen (youngest winner)

List of award recipients, showing the year, role(s), film(s) and language(s)
Year (Note: Denotes The year in which the film was censored by the Central Board of Film Certification.)	Recipient(s)	Role(s)	Work(s)	Language(s)	Refs."
1967 (15th) ‡	Uttam Kumar	Anthony Firingee	Antony Firingee	Bengali	
1967 (15th) ‡	Uttam Kumar	Byomkesh Bakshi	Chiriyakhana	Bengali	
1968 (16th)	Ashok Kumar	Shivnath "Joggi Thakur" Choudhary	Aashirwad	Hindi	
1969 (17th)	Utpal Dutt	Bhuvan Shome	Bhuvan Shome	Hindi	
1970 (18th)	Sanjeev Kumar	Hamid Ahmed	Dastak	Hindi	
1971 (19th)	M. G. Ramachandran	Selvam	Rickshawkaran	Tamil	
1972 (20th)	Sanjeev Kumar	Hari Charan Mathur	Koshish	Hindi	
1973 (21st)	P. J. Antony	Velichapad	Nirmalyam	Malayalam	
1974 (22nd)	Sadhu Meher	Kishtayya	Ankur	Hindi	
1975 (23rd)	M. V. Vasudeva Rao	Choma	Chomana Dudi	Kannada	
1976 (24th)	Mithun Chakraborty	Ghinua	Mrigayaa	Hindi	
1977 (25th)	Bharath Gopi	Shankaran Kutty	Kodiyettam	Malayalam	
1978 (26th)	Arun Mukherjee	Parasuram	Parasuram	Bengali	
1979 (27th)	Naseeruddin Shah	Anirudh Parmar	Sparsh	Hindi	
1980 (28th)	Balan K. Nair	Govindan	Oppol	Malayalam	
1981 (29th)	Om Puri	Hari Mondal	Arohan	Hindi	
1982 (30th)	Kamal Haasan	R. Srinivas (Cheenu)	Moondram Pirai	Tamil	
1983 (31st)	Om Puri	Anant Velankar	Ardh Satya	Hindi	
1984 (32nd)	Naseeruddin Shah	Naurangia	Paar	Hindi	
1985 (33rd)	Shashi Kapoor	Vikas Pande	New Delhi Times	Hindi	
1986 (34th)	Charuhasan	Tabara Shetty	Tabarana Kathe	Kannada	
1987 (35th)	Kamal Haasan	Sakthivelu Nayakar (Note: The character played by Kamal Haasan was loosely based on the Mumbai-based Tamil gangster Varadarajan Mudaliar.)	Nayakan	Tamil	
1988 (36th)	Premji	Raghava Chakyar	Piravi	Malayalam	
1989 (37th) ‡	Mammootty	Vaikom Muhammad Basheer (Note: Mammootty played the real-life character of Vaikom Muhammad Basheer in the film that was based on an autobiographical novel of the same name by Basheer himself .)	Mathilukal	Malayalam	
1989 (37th) ‡	Mammootty	Chandu Chekavar	Oru Vadakkan Veeragatha	Malayalam	
1990 (38th)	Amitabh Bachchan	Vijay Deenanath Chauhan	Agneepath	Hindi	
1991 (39th)	Mohanlal	Kalliyur Gopinathan	Bharatham	Malayalam	
1992 (40th)	Mithun Chakraborty	Shibnath	Tahader Katha	Bengali	
1993 (41st) ‡	Mammootty	Ponthan Mada	Ponthan Mada	Malayalam	
1993 (41st) ‡	Mammootty	Bhaskara Patelar	Vidheyan	Malayalam	
1994 (42nd)	Nana Patekar	Pratap Narayan Tilak	Krantiveer	Hindi	
1995 (43rd)	Rajit Kapur	Mahatma Gandhi	The Making of the Mahatma	English	
1996 (44th)	Kamal Haasan	Senapathy (Indian), Chandrabose (Chandru)	Indian	Tamil	
1997 (45th) †	Balachandra Menon	Ismail	Samaantharangal	Malayalam	
1997 (45th) †	Suresh Gopi	Kannan Perumalayan	Kaliyattam	Malayalam	
1998 (46th) †	Ajay Devgn	Ajay R. Desai	Zakhm	Hindi	
1998 (46th) †	Mammootty	B. R. Ambedkar	Dr. Babasaheb Ambedkar	English	
1999 (47th)	Mohanlal	Kunjikuttan	Vanaprastham	Malayalam	
2000 (48th)	Anil Kapoor	Major Jaidev Rajvansh	Pukar	Hindi	
2001 (49th)	Murali	Appa Mestry	Neythukaran	Malayalam	
2002 (50th)	Ajay Devgn	Bhagat Singh	The Legend of Bhagat Singh	Hindi	
2003 (51st)	Vikram	Chithan	Pithamagan	Tamil	
2004 (52nd)	Saif Ali Khan	Karan Kapoor	Hum Tum	Hindi	
2005 (53rd)	Amitabh Bachchan	Debraj Sahai	Black	Hindi	
2006 (54th)	Soumitra Chatterjee	Shashanka Palit	Podokkhep	Bengali	
2007 (55th)	Prakash Raj	Vengadam	Kanchivaram	Tamil	
2008 (56th)	Upendra Limaye	Tayappa	Jogwa	Marathi	
2009 (57th)	Amitabh Bachchan	Auro	Paa	Hindi	
2010 (58th) †	Dhanush	K. P. Karuppu	Aadukalam	Tamil	
2010 (58th) †	Salim Kumar	Abu	Adaminte Makan Abu	Malayalam	
2011 (59th)	Girish Kulkarni	Keshya	Deool	Marathi	
2012 (60th) †	Irrfan Khan	Paan Singh Tomar	Paan Singh Tomar	Hindi	
2012 (60th) †	Vikram Gokhale	Ratnakar	Anumati	Marathi	
2013 (61st) †	Rajkummar Rao	Shahid Azmi	Shahid	Hindi	
2013 (61st) †	Suraj Venjaramoodu	Father (Note: The character remained unnamed throughout the film.)	Perariyathavar	Malayalam	
2014 (62nd)	Sanchari Vijay	Madesha (Vidya) (Note: Vijay played the character of a transgender.)	Naanu Avanalla...Avalu	Kannada	
2015 (63rd)	Amitabh Bachchan	Bhashkor Banerjee	Piku	Hindi	
2016 (64th)	Akshay Kumar	Commander Rustom Pavri	Rustom (Note: In interviews with The Quint and Hindustan Times, the then-jury chairman Priyadarshan stated that Kumar won the award for Rustom and Airlift, but for technical reasons only one film was mentioned in the list of winners.)	Hindi	
2017 (65th)	Riddhi Sen	Parimal (Puti) (Note: Sen played the character of a transgender.)	Nagarkirtan	Bengali	
2018 (66th) †	Ayushmann Khurrana	Akash	Andhadhun	Hindi	
2018 (66th) †	Vicky Kaushal	Major Vihaan Singh Shergill	Uri: The Surgical Strike	Hindi	
2019 (67th) †	Manoj Bajpayee	Ganpath Bhonsle	Bhonsle	Hindi	
2019 (67th) †	Dhanush	Sivasaami	Asuran	Tamil	
2020 (68th) †	Suriya	Nedumaaran Rajangam (Maara)	Soorarai Pottru	Tamil	
2020 (68th) †	Ajay Devgn	Tanaji Malusare	Tanhaji: The Unsung Warrior	Hindi	
2021 (69th)	Allu Arjun	Pushpa Raj	Pushpa: The Rise	Telugu	
2022 (70th)	Rishab Shetty	Shiva	Kantara	Kannada	
2023 (71st) †	Vikrant Massey	Manoj Kumar Sharma	12th Fail	Hindi	
2023 (71st) †	Shah Rukh Khan	Azad Rathore, Captain Vikram Rathore	Jawan	Hindi	
2024 (72nd) †	Kartik Aaryan	Murlikant Petkar	Chandu Champion	Hindi	
2024 (72nd) †	Mammootty	Kodumon Potti / Chaathan	Bramayugam	Malayalam	
