= Sadhu Meher =

Indian actor, director and producer (1939/1940–2024)

Padma Shri Sadhu Meher
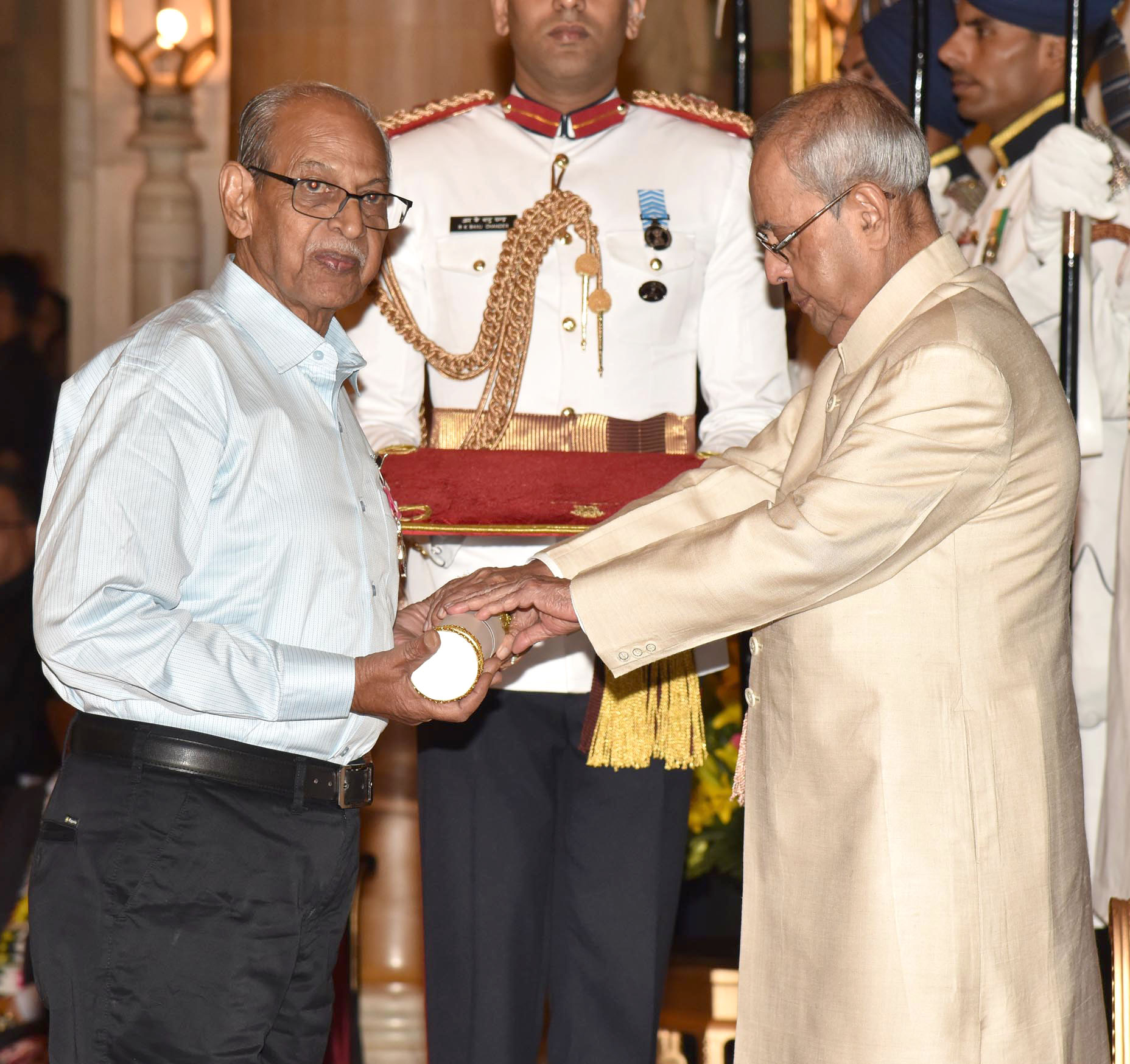
- The late President Pranab Mukherjee presenting the Padma Shri award to Sadhu Meher in 2017.
- Born: 1939/1940; Boudh, Orissa Province, British India
- Died: 2 February 2024 (aged 84); Mumbai, Maharashtra, India
- Occupations: Actor, director and producer
- Notable work: Ankur (1974); Manthan (1976); Nishant (1975); Byomkesh Bakshi (1993–1997)

Sadhu Meher (1939/1940 – 2 February 2024) was an Indian actor, director and producer.

== Life and career ==
Meher performed in both Odia and Hindi films. He began his career in Hindi films such as Bhuvan Shome, Ankur, and Mrigaya. Later he shifted his interest towards Odia films. He was one of the actors who gained prominence in Parallel Cinema in the mid-1980s.

Meher also acted in Byomkesh Bakshi in the episodes "Aadim Shatru (Part 1 & 2)" and "Chakrant" as Anadi Haldar and Bishupal respectively.

Meher won a National Film Award for Best Actor for Ankur. He was conferred Padma Sri by the Government of India in 2017.He is recipient of Odisha State Film Award i.e. Jayadev Award for outstanding contribution to Cinema of Odisha for the year 2008.

Meher died on 2 February 2024, at the age of 84.

== Filmography ==
Actor
Year	Film	Role	Notes
1969	Bhuvan Shome	Jadhav Patel	
1970	Ichhapuran	Sushil	
1974	27 Down		
1974	Ankur	Kishtaya	National Film Award for Best Actor
1975	Nishaant (Night's End)		Special Appearance
1976	Manthan	Mahapatra	
1976	Bati Ghara		
1977	Inkaar	Sitaram	
1977	Gharaonda		
1977	Safed Haathi	Mamaji	
1977	Abhimaan		
1977	Mrigayaa	Bhuban Sardar	
1979	Bhanayak		
1980	Aparichita		Odia film
1980	Kasturi		
1981	Seeta Raati		Odia film
1983	Abhilasha		Odia film
1985	Debshishu	Raghubir	
1989	Bhukha		Sambalpuri film
1993	Pratimurti		
1994	Uttoran	Jatin Kundu	Uncredited role
1994	Charachar	Bhushan	
1997	Shesha Drushti		
1999	Hum Aapke Dil Mein Rehte Hain	Badri Prasad	
2003	Patth	Anna	
2004	30 Days	Ramu	
2007	Jai Jagannatha	Shriya's father-in-law	
2016	Bhagya Na Jaane Koi	Ghisu	

Director
Year	Film
1977	Abhimaan
1980	Aparichita
1983	Desire
1984	Abhilasha
1986	Babula
1994	Gopa Re Badhhuchhi Kala Kanhei

Sadhu Meher also played characters, Anadi Haldar, in the episode "Aadim Shatru (Part 1 & 2)", and Bishupal, in the episode "Chakrant", of Byomkesh Bakshi, broadcast by Doordarshan in 1997.
