= National Film Award for Best Children's Film =

Indian film award

- National award for contributions to Indian Cinema
- Sponsored by: National Film Development Corporation of India
- Formerly called: Prime Minister's Gold Medal for the Best Children's Film
- Rewards: Swarna Kamal (Golden Lotus); ₹3,00,000
- First award: 1954
- Most recent winner: 35 Chinna Katha Kaadu (2024)

The National Film Award for Best Children's Film is one of the National Film Awards presented annually by the National Film Development Corporation of India. It is one of several awards presented for feature films and awarded with Golden Lotus (Swarna Kamal).

The award was instituted in 1954, at 1st National Film Awards and awarded annually for children's films produced in the year across the country, in all Indian languages; Hindi (28 awards), Bengali and Kannada (7 each), Malayalam (6 awards), English (5 awards), Marathi (4 awards), Telugu (2 awards), Tamil, Odia and Assamese (1 award each).

== Winners ==
Award includes 'Golden Lotus Award' (Swarna Kamal) and cash prize. Following are the award winners over the years:

Awards legends
*	Swarna Kamal (Gold Medal) for the Best Children's Film
*	Certificate of Merit for the Second Best Children's Film
*	Certificate of Merit for the Third Best Children's Film
*	Certificate of Merit for the Best Children's Film
*	Indicates a joint award for that year

List of award films, showing the year (award ceremony), language(s), producer(s) and director(s)
Year	Film(s)	Language(s)	Producer(s)	Director(s)	Refs.
1953 (1st)	Khela Ghar	Bengali	Aurora Films	–	
1954 (2nd)	No Award				
1955 (3rd)	No Award				
1956 (4th)	Jaldeep	Bengali	Children's Film Society	Kidar Sharma	
1957 (5th)	Hum Panchhi Ek Daal Ke	Hindi	AVM Productions	P. L. Santoshi	
1957 (5th)	Janmatithi	Bengali	R. B. Films	Dilip Mukherjee	
1958 (6th)	Virsa and the Magic Doll	English	Little Cinema Pvt Ltd.	Santi P. Chowdhury	
1959 (7th)	Banyan Deer	English	Films Division	Ahmed Lateef, Shanti Verma and G. G. Saraiya	
1960 (8th)	Phool Aur Kaliyan	Hindi	Rajkamal Kalamandir	Ram Gabale	
1960 (8th)	Idd Mubarak	Hindi	Children's Film Society	Khwaja Ahmad Abbas	
1960 (8th)	Delhi Ki Kahani	Hindi	Children's Film Society	Rajendra Kumar	
1961 (9th)	Hattogol Vijay	Hindi	Hari S. Dasgupta Productions	Buju Das Gupta and Raghunath Goswami	
1961 (9th)	Savitri	Hindi	Children's Film Society	Phani Majumdar	
1961 (9th)	Nanhe Munne Sitare	Hindi	Ajay Kumar Chakravarty	Ajay Kumar Chakravarty	
1962 (10th)	Raju Aur Gangaram	Hindi	Children's Film Society	Ezra Mir	
1963 (11th)	Panch Puthliyan	Hindi	Children's Film Society	Amit Bose	
1964 (12th)	No Award				
1965 (13th)	The Adventure of A Sugar Doll	English	Children's Film Society	Kantilal Rathod	
1965 (13th)	As You Like It	English	Children's Film Society	S. Shankar	
1966 (14th)	No Award				
1967 (15th)	No Award				
1968 (16th)	Heerer Prajapati	Bengali	Children's Film Society	Shanti P. Chowdhury	
1969 (17th)	No Award				
1970 (18th)	No Award				
1971 (19th)	Wings of Fire	English	–	–	
1972 (20th)	No Award				
1973 (21st)	No Award				
1974 (22nd)	No Award				
1975 (23rd)	No Award				
1976 (24th)					
1977 (25th)	Safed Haathi	Hindi	R. A. Jalan and Pratap Agarwal	Tapan Sinha	
1978 (26th)	Joi Baba Felunath	Bengali	R. D. Bansal	Satyajit Ray	
1979 (27th)	Dangeyedda Makkalu	Kannada	T. N. Narasimhan and B. S. Somasundar	U. S. Vadiraj	
1980 (28th)	No Award				
1981 (29th)	No Award				
1982 (30th)	No Award				
1983 (31st)	Bhombal Sardar	Bengali	Government of West Bengal	Nripen Ganguly	
1984 (32nd)	My Dear Kuttichathan	Malayalam	M. C. Punnoose	Jijo Punnoose	
1985 (33rd)	Aazadi Ki Ore	Hindi	Sangeethalaya	P. S. Prakash	
1986 (34th)	No Award				
1987 (35th)	Swamy	Hindi	T. S. Narasimhan	Shankar Nag	
1988 (36th)	Manu Uncle	Malayalam	Joy Thomas	Dennis Joseph	
1989 (37th)	Ankur Maina Aur Kabootar	Hindi	Children's Film Society	Madan Bawaria	
1989 (37th)	Jamboo Savari	Kannada	K. S. L. Swame (Lalitha Ravee)		
1990 (38th)	No Award				
1991 (39th)	Abhayam	Malayalam	Children's Film Society	Sivan	
1992 (40th)	Mujhse Dosti Karoge	Hindi	National Center of Films for Children and Young People	Gopi Desai	
1993 (41st)	Lavanya Preeti	Oriya	National Center of Films for Children and Young People	Apurba Kishore Bir	
1994 (42nd)	Kochaniyan	Malayalam	Bushura Shahudeen	Satheesh Vengannoor	
1994 (42nd)	Abhay	Hindi	National Center of Films for Children and Young People	Annu Kapoor	
1995 (43rd)	Halo	Hindi	National Center of Films for Children and Young People	Santosh Sivan	
1996 (44th)	Damu	Bengali	Art Films	Raja Sen	
1997 (45th)	Ramayanam	Telugu	M. S. Reddy	Gunasekhar	
1998 (46th)	Kabhi Pass Kabhi Fail	Hindi	National Center of Films for Children and Young People	Virendra Saini	
1999 (47th)	Goal	Hindi	Children's Film Society	Gul Bahar Singh	
2000 (48th)	Gharaksharangal	Malayalam	Salim Padiyath	Salim Padiyath	
2001 (49th)	No Award				
2002 (50th)	Baaja	Hindi	Children's Film Society	Apurba Kishore Bir	
2003 (51st)	Tora	Assamese	Children's Film Society	Jahnu Barua	
2004 (52nd)	Chutkan Ki Mahabharat	Hindi	Children's Film Society	Sankalp Meshram	
2005 (53rd)	The Blue Umbrella	Hindi	UTV Motion Pictures	Vishal Bhardwaj	
2006 (54th)	Care of Footpath	Kannada	Shylaja Shrikanth	Kishan Shrikanth	
2007 (55th)	Photo	Hindi	Children's Film Society	Virendra Saini	
2008 (56th)	Gubbachigalu	Kannada	Media House Studio	Abhaya Simha	
2009 (57th)	Putaani Party	Kannada	Children's Film Society	Ramchandra P. N.	
2009 (57th)	Keshu	Malayalam	Children's Film Society	Sivan	
2010 (58th)	Hejjegalu	Kannada	Basanta Kumar Patil	P. R. Ramadas Naidu	
2011 (59th)	Chillar Party	Hindi	UTV Software Communications and Salman Khan	Vikas Bahl and Nitesh Tiwari	
2012 (60th)	Dekh Indian Circus	Hindi	Mahaveer Jain	Mangesh Hadawale	
2013 (61st)	Kaphal	Hindi	Children's Film Society	Batul Mukhtiar	
2014 (62nd)	Kaaka Muttai	Tamil	Grass Root Film Company	M. Manikandan	
2014 (62nd)	Elizabeth Ekadashi	Marathi	Essel Vision Productions Ltd.	Paresh Mokashi	
2015 (63rd)	Budhia Singh – Born to Run	Hindi	Code Red Films	Soumendra Padhi	
2016 (64th)	Dhanak	Hindi	Drishyam Films	Nagesh Kukunoor	
2017 (65th)	Mhorkya	Marathi	Kalyan Rajmogli Padal	Amar Bharat Deokar	
2018 (66th)	Sarkari Hi. Pra. Shaale, Kasaragodu, Koduge: Ramanna Rai	Kannada	Rishab Shetty Films	Rishab Shetty	
2019 (67th)	Kastoori	Hindi	Insight Films	Vinod Uttreshwar Kamble	
2020 (68th)	Sumi	Marathi	Harshall Kamat Entertainment and Golden Mouse Productions	Amol Vasant Gole	
2021 (69th)	Gandhi & Co.	Gujarati		Manish Saini	
2022 (70th)	No Award				
2023 (71st)	Naal 2	Marathi	Nagraj Manjule and Sudhakar Reddy Yakkanti	Sudhakar Reddy Yakkanti	
2024 (72nd)	35 Chinna Katha Kaadu	Telugu	Srujan Yarabolu and Siddharth Rallapalli	Nanda Kishore Emani	
