= Avtar Krishna Kaul =

Indian director (1939–1974)

Awtar Krishna Kaul
- Born: 27 September 1939; Srinagar
- Died: 20 July 1974 (aged 35); Mumbai
- Occupations: Film director; Screen writer; film producer
- Years active: 1970–1974

Awtar Krishna Kaul (27 September 1939 – 20 July 1974) was an Indian film director who was active between 1970 and 1974. He won the National Film Award for Best Hindi Feature Film for 27 Down (1974). Awtar was the film's screenwriter and producer. The National Film Award for Best Cinematography was awarded to Apurba Kishore Bir. It received the Ecumenical Award at the Locarno Film Festival and the Dulac Prize at the Mannheim International Film Festival. It has been screened at the Festival des 3 Continents, France; IFFI, Goa; and GES-2, Moscow.

In 2024, the film celebrated its golden jubilee year.

Before 27 Down, Awtar worked as an assistant director on Merchant Ivory Productions’ Bombay Talkie (1970).

== Early life ==
Kaul was born on 27 September 1939, in Srinagar, Jammu and Kashmir. His family later moved to Delhi.

He initially worked for the Ministry of External Affairs, and his first posting was in Pakistan. In 1960, he was assigned to the Indian Embassy in New York. The same year, he quit his job to enroll in a diploma program in film making at the Institute of Film Techniques in New York. Thereafter, he pursued a bachelor’s degree program in filmmaking at the City University of New York from 1964 to 1968. During this time, he worked part-time, alternately as a copyeditor/typesetter (“copyholder”) for the Associated Press and as an editor at the British Information Services in New York.

== Career ==
Kaul returned to India in 1970 to work on the Merchant-Ivory production Bombay Talkie. He made his debut—and only—film in 1974 on a budget of 8 lakh. Awtar covered nearly 40% of the budget, with the National Film Development Corporation (NFDC) funding the remainder.

== Personal life ==
Kaul married Anne, an American, during his 14-year stay in the U.S.

== Death ==
Kaul died in a drowning accident while trying to save a friend. The incident occurred in the White House Area of Walkeshwar, Mumbai, on July 20, 1974. On the same day, 27 Down was announced as the winner of two National Awards.
