= National Film Development Corporation of India =

Central agency devoted to Indian cinema

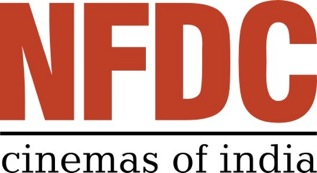
- Industry: Film Industry
- Predecessor: Film Finance Corporation; Films Division of India
- Founded: 1975
- Founder: Government of India
- Headquarters: Mumbai, India
- Area served: Nehru Centre, Dr. Annie Besant Road, Worli, Mumbai – 400 018, India
- Products: Films
- Owner: Ministry of Information and Broadcasting; Government of India
- Website: www.nfdcindia.com

The National Film Development Corporation of India (NFDC) based in Mumbai is the central agency established in 1975, to encourage high quality Indian cinema. It functions in areas of film financing, production and distribution and under the Ministry of Information and Broadcasting, Government of India. The primary goal of the NFDC is to plan, promote and organise an integrated and efficient development of the Indian film industry and foster excellence in cinema.

== History ==
The National Film Development Corporation of India (NFDC) was established in 1975. Over the years, NFDC has provided a wide range of services essential to the growth of Indian cinema especially Indian parallel cinema in the 1970s and 1980s. The NFDC (and its predecessor the Film Finance Corporation) has so far funded or produced over 300 films. These films, in various Indian languages, have been widely acclaimed and have won many national and international awards. An example from the early 2000s is the third ever Kashmiri feature film, Bub ('father' in English), which was directed by Jyoti Sarup.

In 1982, NFDC, chaired by D. V. S. Raju, was also one of the production companies for Gandhi, which won eight Academy Awards.

Film journalist and former editor of Filmfare, B. K. Karanjia remained the chairman of the NFDC for several years. He had been instrumental in the establishment of its predecessor, Film Finance Corporation. Director, Ramesh Sippy took over the position of chairman of NFDC in 2012. He replaced actor Om Puri who was appointed in 2008. In 2026, "NFDC Chairman: Actor G Krishnakumar named head of body before Kerala polls". Deccan Herald.

== Cinemas of India ==
In 2013, NFDC started its label, "Cinemas of India", specifically to promote and distribute the parallel cinema film produced by it, since the 1980s. This also includes the separate "Cinemas of India" website, many of the movies which have long been out of circulation are now restored, and available as free online streaming and also as DVDs. Notable films in the series, include Mirch Masala (1987), Ek Din Achanak (1989), Train to Pakistan (1998), Mammo (1994), Uski Roti (1969), Kamla Ki Maut (1989) and 27 Down (1974).

== Awards ==
In capacity as the producer of various films, NFDC has received various awards.

National Film Awards

Year (Awards)	Title	Language	Category	Shared with
1980 – 28th National Film Awards	Aakrosh	Hindi	Best Feature Film in Hindi	Director – Govind Nihalani
1982 - 30th National Film Awards	Aparoopa	Assamese	Best Feature Film in Assamese	Director – Jahnu Barua
1983 – 31st National Film Awards	Adi Shankaracharya	Sanskrit	Best Feature Film	Director – G. V. Iyer
1983 – 31st National Film Awards	Maya Miriga	Odia	Second Best Feature Film	Director – Nirad N. Mohapatra
1984 – 32nd National Film Awards	Ghare Baire	Bengali	Best Feature Film in Bengali	Director – Satyajit Ray
1984 – 32nd National Film Awards	Music of Satyajit Ray	English	Best Non-Feature Film	Director – Utpalendu Chakrabarty
1984 – 32nd National Film Awards	Jaane Bhi Do Yaaro	Hindi	Best First Film of a Director	Director – Kundan Shah
1986 – 34th National Film Awards	Mirch Masala	Hindi	Best Feature Film in Hindi	Director – Ketan Mehta
1987 – 35th National Film Awards	Pestonjee	Hindi	Best Feature Film in Hindi	Director – Vijaya Mehta
1987 – 35th National Film Awards	Antarjali Jatra	Bengali	Best Feature Film in Bengali	Director – Gautam Ghose
1988 – 36th National Film Awards	Salaam Bombay!	Hindi	Best Feature Film in Hindi	• Co-producer – Mirabai Films • Co-producer -Doordarshan • Director – Mira Nair
1988 – 36th National Film Awards	Main Zinda Hoon	Hindi	Best Film on Other Social Issues	• Co-producer -Doordarshan • Director – Sudhir Mishra
1989 – 37th National Film Awards	Salim Langde Pe Mat Ro	Hindi	Best Feature Film in Hindi	Director – Saeed Akhtar Mirza
1989 – 37th National Film Awards	Ganashatru	Bengali	Best Feature Film in Bengali	Director – Satyajit Ray
1989 – 37th National Film Awards	Percy	Gujarati	Best Feature Film in Gujarati	Director – Pervez Merwanji
1989 – 37th National Film Awards	Marhi Da Deeva	Punjabi	Best Feature Film in Punjabi	Director – Surinder Singh
1989 – 37th National Film Awards	Mane	Kannada	Best Feature Film in Kannada	Director – Girish Kasaravalli
1990 – 38th National Film Awards	Marupakkam	Tamil	Best Feature Film	Director – K. S. Sethumadhavan
1990 – 38th National Film Awards	Ek Doctor Ki Maut	Hindi	Second Best Feature Film	Director – Tapan Sinha
1991 – 39th National Film Awards	Agantuk	Bengali	Best Feature Film	Director – Satyajit Ray
1991 – 39th National Film Awards	Diksha	Hindi	Best Feature Film in Hindi	• Co-producer – Doordarshan • Director – Arun Kaul
1991 – 39th National Film Awards	Dharavi	Hindi	Best Feature Film in Hindi	• Co-producer – Doordarshan • Director – Sudhir Mishra
1991 – 39th National Film Awards	Durga	Hindi	Best Film on Family Welfare	Director – Basu Chatterjee
1992 – 40th National Film Awards	Ek Hota Vidushak	Marathi	Best Feature Film in Marathi	Director – Jabbar Patel
1992 – 40th National Film Awards	Suraj Ka Satvan Ghoda	Hindi	Best Feature Film in Hindi	Director – Shyam Benegal
1992 – 40th National Film Awards	Tahader Katha	Bengali	Best Feature Film in Bengali	Director – Buddhadeb Dasgupta
1992 – 40th National Film Awards	Miss Beatty's Children	English	Best First Film of a Director	• Co-producer – Doordarshan • Co-producer – Rooks AV • Director – Pamela Rooks
1993 – 41st National Film Awards	Antareen	Bengali	Best Feature Film in Bengali	• Co-producer – Doordarshan • Director – Mrinal Sen
1994 – 42nd National Film Awards	Mammo	Hindi	Best Feature Film in Hindi	• Co-producer – Doordarshan • Director – Shyam Benegal
1994 – 42nd National Film Awards	Amidini	Bengali	Best Feature Film in Bengali	• Co-producer – Doordarshan • Director – Chidananda Dasgupta
1994 – 42nd National Film Awards	Wheelchair	Bengali	Best Film on Other Social Issues	Director – Tapan Sinha
1994 – 42nd National Film Awards	Nirbachana	Odia	Best Film on Environment Conservation/Preservation	• Co-producer – Doordarshan • Director – Biplab Ray Chowdhury
1995 – 43rd National Film Awards	Bangarwadi	Marathi	Best Feature Film in Marathi	• Co-producer – Doordarshan • Director – Amol Palekar
1995 – 43rd National Film Awards	The Making of the Mahatma	English	Best Feature Film in English	Director – Shyam Benegal
1995 – 43rd National Film Awards	Stri	Telugu	Best Feature Film in Telugu	Director – K. S. Sethumadhavan
1995 – 43rd National Film Awards	Yugant	Bengali	Best Feature Film in Bengali	Director – Aparna Sen
1995 – 43rd National Film Awards	Doghi	Marathi	Best Film on Other Social Issues	• Co-producer – Doordarshan • Director – Sumitra Bhave • Director – Sunil Sukathankar
1995 – 43rd National Film Awards	Sanabi	Meitei	Best Feature Film in Manipuri	Director – Aribam Syam Sharma
1997 – 45th National Film Awards	Mangamma	Malayalam	Best Feature Film in Malayalam	Director – T. V. Chandran
1997 – 45th National Film Awards	Shesha Drushti	Odia	Best Feature Film in Odia	Director – Apurba Kishore Bir
1998 – 46th National Film Awards	Samar	Hindi	Best Feature Film in Hindi	• Co-producer – Shyam Benegal • Co-producer – Sahyadri Films • Director – Shyam Benegal
1999 – 47th National Film Awards	Biswaprakash	Odia	Best Feature Film in Odia	Director – Sushant Misra
2001 – 49th National Film Awards	Bub	Kashmiri	Best Feature Film on National Integration	Director – Jyoti Sarup
2001 – 49th National Film Awards	Hemanter Pakhi	Bengali	Best Feature Film in Bengali	Director – Urmi Chakraborty
2001 – 49th National Film Awards	Thilaadanam	Telugu	Best First Film of a Director	Director – K. N. T. Sastry
2001 – 49th National Film Awards	Magunira Shagada	Odia	Best Feature Film in Odia	Director – Prafulla Mohanty
2002 – 50th National Film Awards	Vastupurush	Marathi	Best Feature Film in Marathi	• Director – Sumitra Bhave • Director – Sunil Sukhtankar
2003 – 51st National Film Awards	Dance Like a Man	English	Best Feature Film in English	Director – Pamela Rooks
2003 – 51st National Film Awards	Raghu Romeo	Hindi	Best Feature Film in Hindi	Director – Rajat Kapoor
2009 – 57th National Film Awards	Paltadacho Munis	Konkani	Best Feature Film in Konkani	Director – Laxmikant Shetgaonkar
2011 – 59th National Film Awards	Anhe Ghore Da Daan	Punjabi	Best Feature Film in Punjabi	Director – Gurvinder Singh
2012 – 60th National Film Awards	The Good Road	Gujarati	Best Feature Film in Gujarati	Director- Gyan Correa
2015 – 63rd National Film Awards	Chauthi Koot	Punjabi	Best Feature Film in Punjabi	Director – Gurvinder Singh

International awards

Film	Award	Category
Gandhi (1982)	55th Academy Awards	Academy Award for Best Picture
Gandhi (1982)	36th British Academy Film Awards	BAFTA Award for Best Film
Gandhi (1982)	David di Donatello Awards	David di Donatello for Best Foreign Film
Gandhi (1982)	40th Golden Globe Awards	Golden Globe Award for Best Foreign Film
Gandhi (1982)	National Board of Review Awards 1982	National Board of Review Award for Best Film
Gandhi (1982)	1982 New York Film Critics Circle Awards	New York Film Critics Circle Award for Best Film

== Films produced ==
Key
†	Denotes films that have not yet been released

Year	Film	Director	Language
1971	Ashadh Ka Ek Din	Mani Kaul	Hindi
1972	Maya Darpan	Kumar Shahani	Hindi
1973	Duvidha	Mani Kaul	Hindi
1974	27 Down	Avtar Krishna Kaul	Hindi
1978	Arvind Desai Ki Ajeeb Dastaan	Saeed Akhtar Mirza	Hindi
1978	Gaman	Muzaffar Ali	Hindi
1980	Aakrosh	Govind Nihalani	Hindi
1982	Aparoopa	Jahnu Barua	Assamese
1982	Gandhi	Richard Attenborough	English
1983	Jaane Bhi Do Yaaro	Kundan Shah	Hindi
1983	Godam	Dilip Chitre	Hindi
1983	Adi Shankaracharya	G. V. Iyer	Sanskrit
1984	Ghare Baire	Satyajit Ray	Bengali
1984	Tarang	Kumar Shahani	Hindi
1984	Maya Miriga	Nirad N. Mohapatra	Odia
1985	Massey Sahib	Pradip Krishen	Hindi
1985	Debshishu	Utpalendu Chakrabarty	Hindi
1987	Mirch Masala	Ketan Mehta	Hindi
1987	Antarjali Jatra	Gautam Ghose	Bengali
1988	Pestonjee	Vijaya Mehta	Hindi
1988	Main Zinda Hoon	Sudhir Mishra	Hindi
1988	Salaam Bombay!	Mira Nair	Hindi
1989	Salim Langde Pe Mat Ro	Saeed Akhtar Mirza	Hindi
1989	Ek Din Achanak	Mrinal Sen	Hindi
1989	Marhi Da Deeva	Surinder Singh	Punjabi
1989	Kamla Ki Maut	Basu Chatterjee	Hindi
1989	Percy	Pervez Merwanji	Gujarati
1990	Ganashatru	Satyajit Ray	Bengali
1990	Ek Doctor Ki Maut	Tapan Sinha	Hindi
1990	Mane	Girish Kasaravalli	Kannada
1990	Disha	Sai Paranjpye	Hindi
1991	Nazar	Mani Kaul	Hindi
1991	Kasba	Kumar Shahani	Hindi
1991	Diksha	Arun Kaul	Hindi
1991	Agantuk	Satyajit Ray	Bengali
1992	Marupakkam	K. S. Sethumadhavan	Tamil
1992	Dharavi	Sudhir Mishra	Hindi
1992	Miss Beatty's Children	Pamela Rooks	English
1992	Ek Hota Vidushak	Jabbar Patel	Marathi
1992	Suraj Ka Satvan Ghoda	Shyam Benegal	Hindi
1992	Tahader Katha	Buddhadev Dasgupta	Bengali
1993	Antareen	Mrinal Sen	Bengali
1994	Mammo	Shyam Benegal	Hindi
1994	Galige	M. S. Sathyu	Kannada
1994	Amodini	Chidananda Dasgupta	Bengali
1994	Mukta	Jabbar Patel	Marathi
1994	Aranyaka	Apurba Kishore Bir	Hindi
1995	Naseem	Saeed Akhtar Mirza	Hindi
1995	Limited Manuski	Jayoo Patwardhan	Marathi
1995	Bangarwadi	Amol Palekar	Marathi
1995	Doghi	Sumitra Bhave & Sunil Sukthankar	Marathi
1995	Yugant	Aparna Sen	Bengali
1996	Kraurya	Girish Kasaravalli	Kannada
1997	Jaya Ganga	Vijay Singh	Hindi
1997	Dance of the Wind	Rajan Khosa	Hindi & English
1997	Char Adhyay	Kumar Shahani	Hindi
1997	Rui Ka Bojh	Subhash Agrawal	Hindi
1997	Kaal Sandhya	Bhabendra Nath Saikia	Hindi
1997	Shesha Drushti	Apurba Kishore Bir	Odia
1997	Mangamma	T. V. Chandran	Malayalam
1998	Poothiruvathira Ravil	V.R. Gopinath	Malayalam
1999	Biswaprakash	Susant Misra	Odia
1999	Samar	Shyam Benegal	Hindi
2000	Thiladaanam	K. N. T. Sastry	Telugu
2001	Dattak	Gul Bahar Singh	Hindi
2001	Bub	Jyoti Sarup	Kashmiri
2002	Magunira Shagada	Prafulla Mohanty	Odia
2002	Hemanter Pakhi	Urmi Chakraborty	Bengali
2002	Kali Salwar	Fareeda Mehta	Hindi
2002	Devi Ahilya Bai	Jayoo & Natiker	Marathi
2002	Vastupurush	Sumitra Bhave & Sunil Sukthankar	Marathi
2003	Raghu Romeo	Rajat Kapoor	Hindi
2003	Five by Four	Roopa Swaminathan	English
2004	Dance Like a Man	Pamela Rooks	English
2004	1:1.6 an Ode to Lost Love	Madhu Ambat	English
2008	Bioscope	K. M. Madhusudhanan	Malayalam
2009	Paltadacho Munis	Laxmikant Shetgaonkar	Konkani
2011	Anhe Ghore Da Daan	Gurvinder Singh	Punjabi
2011	HE...	Mangesh Joshi	Bhojpuri
2011	Haat - The Weekly Bazaar	Seema Kapoor	Hindi
2012	Ekhon Nedekha Nodir Xhipare	Bidyut Kotoky	Assamese
2013	Gangoobai	Priya Krishnaswamy	Marathi
2013	The Good Road	Gyan Correa	Gujarati
2014	Attihannu Mattu Kanaja	M S Prakash Babu	Kannada
2015	Island City	Ruchika Oberoi	Hindi
2015	Kaliyachan	Farook Abdul Rahiman	Malayalam
2015	The Fourth Direction	Gurvinder Singh	Punjabi
2023	Chidiakhana	Manish Tiwary	Hindi
2024	Goodbye Guruji	Arunjit Borah	Assamese
2025	Chhaad: The Terrace	Indrani Chakrabarti	Bengali
2025	Tanvi the Great	Anupam Kher	Hindi

== See also ==
- Children's Film Society, India
- List of Indian Academy Award winners and nominees
- List of Indian submissions for the Academy Award for Best Foreign Language Film
