= Pestonjee =

- Poster
- Directed by: Vijaya Mehta
- Screenplay by: B. K. Karanjia; Vijaya Mehta
- Story by: B. K. Karanjia
- Produced by: NFDC
- Starring: Anupam Kher; Naseeruddin Shah; Shabana Azmi; Kirron Kher
- Cinematography: A. K. Bir; Rajan Kothari
- Edited by: Renu Saluja
- Music by: Vanraj Bhatia
- Release date: 20 May 1988 (India)
- Running time: 125 minutes
- Country: India
- Language: Hindi

Pestonjee is a 1988 Indian Hindi-language drama film directed by Vijaya Mehta, starring Anupam Kher, Naseeruddin Shah and Shabana Azmi, based on a story by film journalist B. K. Karanjia.

At the 35th National Film Awards, it won the award for Best Feature Film in Hindi.

== Synopsis ==
The film is an intimate look into the life and manners of the Parsi community, especially those living in the city of Bombay (now Mumbai) in the 1950s and 60s. Phiroj Shah and Pestonjee are close friends. They like to do everything together (and even plan to get married on the same day), even though they are very different in temperament. Phiroj is quiet, thoughtful and indecisive, while Pestonjee (Pesi) is an extrovert. Phiroj is unable to make up his mind about marrying a girl, Jeroo, selected for him by a matchmaker. It is Pesi who ends up marrying her. Phiroj has fallen in love with her, but does not begrudge Pesi his happiness. He decides not to marry, and moves to another city. They keep in touch by mail. Phiroj is extremely delighted to hear that Pesi and Jeroo are expecting a baby. He decides to travel to Bombay to visit them. During his visit, Phiroj learns that the married life of Pesi and Jeroo is not as he had imagined it. Phiroj is horrified to discover that Pesi has a mistress. Jeroo has had a miscarriage which Pesi later informs him, when confronted by Phiroj about his mistress, was actually an abortion due to Jeroo's fear of dying in childbirth as her mother had. He is saddened by how Jeroo has changed. She is no longer the pretty girl she was, but appears cantankerous and uncaring. Both she and Pesi are unhappy in their marriage. Phiroj resolves not to meet them, but mentally is unable to keep himself aloof. All three carry on with their unhappy lives until Pesi's sudden death. Finally, Phiroj discovers that he cannot help Jeroo. Soona, Pesi's mistress whom Phiroj had thought of as a loose woman, ends up paying for the funeral which Phiroj repays to her as he cannot abide the thought that in even his death, Pesi's mistress has a hold on him. In the end, Phiroj realizes that life was not what he imagined it would be and it is everybody's journey in life to find and determine what their own happiness is.

== Cast ==
- Naseeruddin Shah as Phirojshah Pithawala
- Anupam Kher as Pestonjee (Pissi)
- Shabana Azmi as Jeroo
- Kiron Kher as Soona Mistry

== Reception ==
Critically, the film was generally well appreciated, both for its meticulous depiction of Parsi life and for the performances by all the lead actors. Scholars Gokulsing and Dissanayake write: "... there is certainly a strain of sentimentality in the film. But it is counterbalanced by the comic observations of the director and the humour generated by the dialogue as well as the acting."

Academic and activist Ruth Vanita has a different take on the film. She sees it as an interesting attempt by a woman director to study the male psyche. She notes: "The film is about ways of seeing. Thus, though Feroze's (played by Naseerudin Shah) is the central consciousness in the film, it is named for his dearest friend Pestonjee, known as Pesi (played by Anupam Kher). This titling after the one seen rather than the one seeing suggests how the imaginative life we live, which may be the life of another, can overshadow the life that is apparently our own." On Azmi's portrayal of Jeroo, she writes: "The portrait of Jeroo, as she develops from a naive, romantic but not very intelligent girl into a cantankerous, hysterical wife (and, later, widow) is a brilliant study of a woman destroyed by the compulsions of an unsuitable marriage. The way her gift for piano playing, and ultimately even her desire to play, are eroded by the stresses of domesticity and bondage to an uncaring husband, represents a drama enacted in the lives of many women."

== Awards ==
- National Film Award for Best Feature Film in Hindi
- National Film Award for Best Costume Design - Ramilla Patel and Mani Rabadi
- BFJA Award for Best Indian Film (with two others)
- BFJA Award for Best Actor in a Supporting Role - Anupam Kher
