= Ankur (film) =

1974 film by Shyam Benegal

Ankur: The Seedling
- Film poster
- Directed by: Shyam Benegal
- Written by: Shyam Benegal (Screenplay); Satyadev Dubey (Dialogue)
- Produced by: Lalit M. Bijlani, Freni Variava; Blaze Film Enterprises
- Starring: Shabana Azmi; Sadhu Meher; Anant Nag
- Cinematography: Govind Nihalani; Kamath Ghanekar
- Music by: Vanraj Bhatia
- Release date: 24 September 1974
- Running time: 125 minutes
- Country: India
- Language: Dakhani

Ankur (English: The Seedling) is a 1974 Indian Hindi-language drama film directed by Shyam Benegal in his directorial debut. The film features Shabana Azmi in her acting debut, alongside Sadhu Meher and Anant Nag.

Like later Benegal's films, Ankur belongs to the genre of Indian art films, or more precisely, Indian parallel cinema. The plot is based on a true story that occurred in Hyderabad, apparently in the 1950s. The film was shot in Hyderabad and filmed almost entirely on location.

Ankur won three National Film Awards, including Second Best Feature Film, Best Actress for Azmi and Best Actor for Meher, as well as numerous other prizes in India and abroad. It was nominated for the Golden Bear at the 24th Berlin International Film Festival.

== Plot ==
Ankur analyzes human behaviour in general and heavily stresses characterisation (though the story is not fictional).

Lakshmi lives in a village with her husband Kishtayya, a deaf-mute alcoholic potter who communicates using gestures. The couple is poor and belongs to the lowly Dalit caste. Lakshmi attends a village festival and prays faithfully to the Goddess, stating that her only desire in life is to have a child.

Surya, the son of the village landlord, had just finished his studies in the nearby city of Hyderabad and arrives back home. Surya's father has a mistress named Kaushalya with whom he has an illegitimate son named Pratap. Surya's father claims to have given Kaushalya "the best land in the village", a gift which serves as both a token of his affection and also keeps Kaushalya quiet and satisfied. Surya is forced by his father into a child marriage with the underaged Saru and begins to feel extremely sexually frustrated due to the fact that they cannot have sex until Saru reaches puberty.

Surya reluctantly takes over the administrative responsibilities of his share of land in the village. Alone, he moves into a different, older house, and Lakshmi and Kishtayya are sent as his servants. Not long after his arrival, he begins to exert his authority by introducing a number of different laws and measures, many of which are controversial among the village people. Almost immediately, Surya starts to form an attraction towards Lakshmi and gives her the task of cooking his meals and serving him tea. This does not sit well with the village priest, a man who traditionally delivers food to the landowner, though at a higher price than Lakshmi asks.

Surya also hires Kishtayya to ride his bullock cart and run his errands. The following day, he has Kishtayya collect fertilizer from the landlord's house. Surya then uses Kishtayya's absence to flirt with Lakshmi, but she fails to reciprocate. In the meantime, the villagers have begun to gossip, and many (most notably the overseer, Police Officer Patel Sheikh Chand) believe that Surya has already slept with Lakshmi, and will act in the same way that his father did: try to conceal the scandal by giving his mistress a vast plot of land.

Kishtayya is caught stealing toddy, after which he is publicly humiliated, and he decides to leave the village due to the embarrassment. In his absence, Surya and Lakshmi sleep together. Some time later, Saru arrives at the village in order to live with her husband. She does not approve of Lakshmi's presence, partly because Lakshmi is a Dalit and partly because Saru has heard the villagers' rumours. The next morning, Lakshmi has morning sickness, and Saru fires her, claiming that she is too sick to work.

Many days go by, and eventually Kishtayya returns, having cured himself of his alcoholism and made some money. Lakshmi is overwhelmed with a feeling of guilt, because she believes that she has betrayed her husband. On discovering Lakshmi's pregnancy, he salutes the village goddess at her temple, acknowledging that his wife's wish has been granted. He then decides to return to work and hopefully ride the bullock cart once again for Surya. Surya sees Kishtayya and mistakenly believes that Kishtayya is seeking revenge from him due to his infidelity with Lakshmi.

Surya orders three men to grab hold of Kishtayya and then proceeds to whip him with a rope used for lynching. The commotion attracts others, including Sheikh Chand and Pratap, to the scene, and Lakshmi rushes to defend her husband. She angrily curses Surya, then slowly returns home with Kishtayya. In the final scene, after the others have left, a young child throws a stone at Surya's glass window and runs away.

== Cast ==
- Shabana Azmi as Lakshmi
- Sadhu Meher as Kishtaya
- Anant Nag as Surya
- Priya Tendulkar as Saru
- Mirza Qadir Ali Baig as Surya's father
- Prafullata Natu as Surya's mother
- Dalip Tahil
- Agha Mohammed Hussain as Sheik Chand

== Production ==
Anant Nag was introduced by Benegal in Hindi films after his higher education in Mumbai. Shabana Azmi, a fresh graduate from Film and Television Institute of India, Pune (FTII), was not the first choice for the role of Lakshmi. Benegal had earlier approached Waheeda Rehman, Anju Mahendru, and Sharada, all of whom had refused his offer. Thereafter, he chose Shabana Azmi; he had to alter the script a bit to suit the younger-looking Lakshmi.

== Music ==
Being an Indian art film, Ankur is a "straight" feature without musical sequences. However, Surya plays parts of two records over the course of the film. The first recording consists of the third stanza of the song "Yahi To Hai Woh" by Mohd. Rafi from Solvan Saal (1958). The fourth stanza is then played in the background while Surya talks to Lakshmi.

The film also includes several scenes in which villagers sing folk songs, mostly in Telugu.

== Reception ==
The film was both a commercial and critical success. The film's producer, Lalit M. Bijlani, who produced the film for just five lakhs rupees, went on to make one crore with its release. On the review aggregator website Rotten Tomatoes, 100% of 8 critics' reviews are positive, with an average rating of 8/10.

The Independent noted "the deeply impressive lead performance by Shabana Azmi demonstrates Ankur as one of the most mature and compelling films the Indian cinema has to offer". For the Time Out reviewer, the film "recalled the modest realism of Satyajit Ray".

== Awards ==
- 1975 National Film Award for Second Best Feature Film: Shyam Benegal
- 1975 National Film Award for Best Actor: Sadhu Meher
- 1975 National Film Award for Best Actress: Shabana Azmi
- 1974: Berlin International Film Festival: Golden Berlin Bear: nominated

== See also ==
- Muslim culture of Hyderabad (for more examples of Dakhani)
