= Debshishu =

1985 film by Utpalendu Chakrabarty

- Promotional Poster
- Directed by: Utpalendu Chakrabarty
- Produced by: NFDC
- Starring: Smita Patil; Om Puri; Rohini Hattangadi; Sadhu Meher
- Release date: 1985
- Running time: 1 hour 40 min
- Country: India
- Language: Hindi

Debshishu (transl. Lord's children) is a 1985 Indian Hindi-language film directed by Utpalendu Chakrabarty, starring Smita Patil and Om Puri. The film is an NFDC production, and Patil worked without remuneration.

== Plot ==
An illiterate man and his wife live life on the road after their village was destroyed by a flood. When the man's wife gives birth to a deformed baby, proclaimed to be a 'child of the devil' by the local pundit (Hindu priest) who forces them to abandon the infant and exiles them from the community. The couple's journey then takes them on a series of bizarre and heart-breaking revelations.

== Cast ==
- Smita Patil
- Om Puri
- Rohini Hattangadi
- Sadhu Meher
