= Baaja =

- Directed by: Apurba Kishore Bir
- Written by: Apurba Kishore Bir
- Produced by: Children's Film Society; India
- Starring: Yakub Shaikh; Ram Avna; Roni Bhatt; Saroj Bhagwar
- Cinematography: Apurba Kishore Bir
- Edited by: Aseem Sinha
- Music by: Bhavdeep Jaipurwale
- Distributed by: Children's Film Society
- Release date: 2002
- Running time: 80 minutes
- Country: India
- Language: Hindi

Baaja (Mouth Organ; Hindi: बाजा) is a 2002 Indian Hindi film directed by Apurba Kishore Bir.

== Synopsis ==
A free and compassionate human spirit is trapped in Shibu, an eleven-year-old boy. In order to guide Shibu's wandering energy on a constructive path, his widow mother sends him to the city from the village with his uncle. But Shibu's carefree approach to life and his energetic response to reality make him a subject of annoyance to the neighbour as well as his own aunt. This forces his uncle to be strict with him, and he takes him along to his shoe shop in order to keep a watch on him while studying. But the situation leads Shibu on a different track. Being asked by the uncle to carry a pair of shoes to a doctor's residence, Shibu ventures across the streets and lanes in his casual and carefree manner while encountering some stray incidents. But then something very sudden and unpredictable happens, which invites him to show his true potential and real merit to surprise the adults, effected by his indifferent attitude.

== Cast ==
- Yakub Shaikhl
- Ram Awana as shibu's uncle
- Roni Bhatt
- Saroj Bhagwar
- Manisha Rajpal
- Chitra Pandey

== Crew ==
- Director/Script : Apurba Kishore Bir
- Story & Screenplay: Apurba Kishore Bir
- Cinematography : Apurba Kishore Bir
- Music : Bhavdeep Jaipurwale
- Editing : Aseem Sinha
- Dialogue : Hubnath Pandey
- Sound : Nihar Ranjan Samel

== Awards & Participation ==
- National Film Awards 2003 (Best Children Film)

== Music ==
Bhavdeep Jaipurwale arranged the music for this film.

== Review ==
A. K. Bir too has a child protagonist in Baaja. Shibu is brought from the village to the town to be better educated. The boy's encounters and adventures on the streets bring out his savvy nature and concern for others; they also give him a better understanding of values. Shibu gives first aid to a grandma who has been cudgelled by a thief, minds the wailing baby, finds a doctor, and recovers the stolen gold chain. Since Bir is unable to decide whether to opt for realism or the fairy tale mode, the film hangs uneasily between the two genres.

== See also ==
- National Film Award for Best Children's Film
