= Nargis Dutt Award for Best Feature Film on National Integration =

Indian film award

- National award for contributions to Indian Cinema
- Sponsored by: Directorate of Film Festivals
- Formerly called: Best Feature Film on National Unity and Emotional Integration
- Rewards: Rajat Kamal (Silver Lotus); ₹50,000
- First award: 1965
- Final award: 2021
- Most recent winner: The Kashmir Files

Highlights
- Total awarded: 48
- First winner: Shaheed

The Nargis Dutt Award for Best Feature Film on National Integration was one of the National Film Awards presented annually by the Directorate of Film Festivals, the organization set up by Ministry of Information and Broadcasting, India. It is one of several awards presented for feature films and awarded with Rajat Kamal (Silver Lotus). At the 70th National Film Awards, the category was discontinued and combined with Best Film on Environment Conservation/Preservation, Best Film on Family Welfare and Best Film on Other Social Issues. The new award is named as Best Feature Film Promoting National, Social and Environmental Values.

The award was instituted in 1965, at 13th National Film Awards and awarded annually for films produced in the year across the country, in all Indian languages.

== Winners ==
Award includes 'Rajat Kamal' (Silver Lotus) and cash prize. Following are the award winners over the years:

List of films, showing the year (award ceremony), language(s), producer(s) and director(s)
Year	Film(s)	Language(s)	Producer(s)	Director(s)	Refs.
1965 (13th)	Shaheed	Hindi	Kewal Kashyap	S. Ram Sharma	
1966 (14th)	Subhas Chandra	Bengali	A. K. Banerjee	Piyush Bose	
1967 (15th)	No Award				
1968 (16th)	Janmabhoomi	Malayalam	Roopa Rekha	John Sankaramangalam	
1969 (17th)	Saat Hindustani	Hindi	Khwaja Ahmad Abbas	Khwaja Ahmad Abbas	
1970 (18th)	Thurakkatha Vathil	Malayalam	A. Raghunath	P. Bhaskaran	
1971 (19th)	Do Boond Pani	Hindi	Khwaja Ahmad Abbas	Khwaja Ahmad Abbas	
1972 (20th)	Achanum Bappayum	Malayalam	C. C. Baby	K. S. Sethumadhavan	
1973 (21st)	Garm Hava (Note: Gita Siddharth (Leading Actress) was awarded with Medallion.)	Hindi	Unit 3 MM	M. S. Sathyu	
1974 (22nd)	Parinay (Note: Romesh Sharma (Leading Actor) and Shabana Azmi (Leading Actress) were awarded with Medallion.)	Hindi	Samantar Chitra	Kantilal Rathod	
1975 (23rd)	No Award				
1976 (24th)	No Award				
1977 (25th)	No Award				
1978 (26th)	Grahana	Kannada	Harsha Pictures	T. S. Nagabharana	
1979 (27th)	22 June 1897	Marathi	• Nachiket Patwardhan • Jayoo Patwardhan	• Nachiket Patwardhan • Jayoo Patwardhan	
1980 (28th)	Bhavni Bhavai	Gujarati	Sanchar Film Cooperative Society Ltd.	Ketan Mehta	
1981 (29th)	Saptapadi	Telugu	Bheemavarapu Buchhireddy	K. Viswanath	
1982 (30th)	Aaroodam	Malayalam	Rosamma George	I. V. Sasi	
1983 (31st)	Sookha	Hindi	M. S. Sathyu	M. S. Sathyu	
1984 (32nd)	Aadmi Aur Aurat	Hindi	Doordarshan	Tapan Sinha	
1985 (33rd)	Sree Narayana Guru	Malayalam	A. Jaffer	P. A. Backer	
1986 (34th)	No Award				
1987 (35th)	Tamas	Hindi	Blaze Entertainment	Govind Nihalani	
1988 (36th)	Rudraveena	Telugu	Nagendra Babu	K. Balachander	
1989 (37th)	Santha Shishunala Sharifa	Kannada	Yajaman Enterprises	T. S. Nagabharana	
1990 (38th)	No Award				
1991 (39th)	Aadi Mimansa	Oriya	Apurba Kishore Bir	Apurba Kishore Bir	
1992 (40th)	Roja	Tamil	Kavithalayaa Productions	Mani Ratnam	
1993 (41st)	Sardar	Hindi	Late H. M. Patel	Ketan Mehta	
1994 (42nd)	Mukta	Marathi	Ashok B. Mhatre	Jabbar Patel	
1995 (43rd)	Bombay	Tamil	• Mani Ratnam • S. Sriram	Mani Ratnam	
1996 (44th)	Kaanaakkinaavu	Malayalam	P. V. Gangadharan	Sibi Malayil	
1997 (45th)	Border	Hindi	J. P. Dutta	J. P. Dutta	
1998 (46th)	Zakhm	Hindi	Pooja Bhatt	Mahesh Bhatt	
1999 (47th)	Shaheed Udham Singh	Punjabi	Iqbal Dhillon	Chitraarth	
2000 (48th)	Pukar	Hindi	Surinder Kapoor	Rajkumar Santoshi	
2001 (49th)	Bub	Kashmiri	NFDC	Jyoti Sarup	
2002 (50th)	Mr. and Mrs. Iyer	English	N. Venkatesan	Aparna Sen	
2003 (51st)	Pinjar	Hindi	Lucky Star Entertainment Ltd	Chandraprakash Dwivedi	
2004 (52nd)	Netaji Subhas Chandra Bose: The Forgotten Hero	Hindi	Sahara India Media Communication Ltd.	Shyam Benegal	
2005 (53rd)	Daivanamathil	Malayalam	Aryadan Shaukath	Jayaraj	
2006 (54th)	Kallarali Hoovagi	Kannada	S. Madhu Bangarappa	T. S. Nagabharana	
2007 (55th)	Dharm	Hindi	Sheetal V. Talwar	Bhavna Talwar	
2008 (56th)	Aai Kot Nai	Assamese	Rajen Bora	Manju Borah	
2009 (57th)	Delhi-6	Hindi	Rakeysh Omprakash Mehra	Rakeysh Omprakash Mehra	
2010 (58th)	Moner Manush	Bengali	Gautam Kundu	Gautam Ghose	
2011 (59th)	No Award				
2012 (60th)	Thanichalla Njan	Malayalam	Cherian Philippose	Babu Thiruvalla	
2013 (61st)	Thalaimuraigal	Tamil	Company Productions	Balu Mahendra	
2014 (62nd)	No Award				
2015 (63rd)	Nanak Shah Fakir	Punjabi	Sartaj Singh Pannu	–	
2016 (64th)	Dikchow Banat Palaax	Assamese	Canvascope	Sanjib Sabha Pandit	
2017 (65th)	Dhappa	Marathi	Sumatilal Popatlal Shah	Nipun Dharmadhikari	
2018 (66th)	Ondalla Eradalla	Kannada	DN Cinemas	D. Satya Prakash	
2019 (67th)	Taj Mahal	Marathi	Tuline Studios Pvt. Ltd.	Niyaz Mujawar	
2020 (68th)	No Award				
2021 (69th)	The Kashmir Files	Hindi	Abhishek Agarwal Arts	Vivek Agnihotri	
