= The Good Road =

2013 Indian drama film

- Film poster
- Directed by: Gyan Correa
- Written by: Gyan Correa
- Produced by: National Film Development Corporation of India Rohandeep Singh
- Starring: Ajay Gehi; Sonali Kulkarni
- Cinematography: Amitabha Singh
- Music by: Rajat Dholakia
- Production company: National Film Development Corporation of India
- Release date: 19 July 2013
- Running time: 92 minutes
- Country: India
- Language: Gujarati
- Budget: ₹ 2.25 crore

The Good Road is a 2013 Indian Gujarati-language drama film written and directed by Gyan Correa. It was selected as the Indian entry for the Best Foreign Language Film at the 86th Academy Awards, but it was not nominated. The film won the award for Best Gujarati film at the 60th National Film Awards. It is told in a hyperlink format, where several stories are intertwined, with the center of the action being a highway in the rural lands of Gujarat near a town in Kutch. The film is the first Gujarati film ever selected to represent India at the Oscars.

== Cast ==
- Shamji Dhana Kerasia as Pappu
- Sonali Kulkarni as Kiran
- Ajay Gehi as David
- Keval Katrodia as Aditya
- Poonam Kesar Singh as Poonam
- Priyank Upadhyay as Shaukat

== Awards ==
The film won the Best Gujarati film award at the 60th National Film Awards for "capturing the flavor of the never-ending and undulating highways of the other India and its hidden facets." The film won the Best Feature Film Jury Award at the Indian Film Festival, Houston in October 2013.

=== Oscar selection ===
The film was selected out of 20 films initially submitted to the Film Federation of India for consideration for the Oscars. Ritesh Batra's film The Lunchbox was considered to be the frontrunner and certain lock for India's Oscar selection, with many critics unanimously praising it and voting for it to be the representative film. Director Karan Johar also put his support behind the film saying, "All kinds of audience can connect with it and yet within the parameters of love story it is completely unusual. You feel all the love in the world for the protagonists and the unusual aspect of it is they haven't met."

However, the selection committee, which deliberated on 17 September 2013, unanimously decided that The Good Road was the perfect film to represent India. Head of the committee was award-winning filmmaker Gautam Ghose, who said, "This is a new film but The Good Road surprises as it shows the unknown India through the story of a boy who is lost and then found while his family is on a holiday trip to Kutch".

The Chief Minister of Gujarat at that time, Narendra Modi tweeted that he was proud that a Gujarati film was selected for the Oscars for the first time.

== See also ==
- List of submissions to the 86th Academy Awards for Best Foreign Language Film
- List of Indian submissions for the Academy Award for Best Foreign Language Film
- Gujarati cinema
- List of Gujarati films
