= Aadi Mimansa =

- Directed by: Apurba Kishore Bir
- Written by: Apurba Kishore Bir
- Starring: Ashok Kumar, Mohan Gokhale, Neena Gupta
- Cinematography: Apurba Kishore Bir
- Edited by: Dilip Panda
- Music by: Bhavdeep Jaipurwale
- Release date: 1991
- Country: India
- Languages: Odia; Hindi

Aadi Mimansa (English: A Rare Solution) is a 1991 Indian Hindi and Odia-language film directed by Apurba Kishore Bir, starring Ashok Kumar, Mohan Gokhale, Neena Gupta, Gloria Mahanty, Bijainee Misra, Nargis and Lalatendu Rath. The film marked the directorial debut of cinematographer Apurba Kishore Bir and went on to win the 1991 Nargis Dutt Award for Best Feature Film on National Integration and Best Cinematography for Bir.

== Cast ==
- Ashok Kumar
- Mohan Gokhale
- Neena Gupta
- Gloria Mahanty
- Bijainee Misra
- Nargis
- Lalatendu Rath
- Arveen Panda
- Smeeti Mishra
