= 27 Down =

1974 Indian Hindi film

- Original Movie Poster.
- Directed by: Avtar Krishna Kaul
- Screenplay by: Avtar Krishna Kaul
- Based on: Athara Sooraj Ke Paudhe by Ramesh Bakshi
- Produced by: Avtar Krishna Kaul
- Starring: Raakhee; M.K. Raina
- Cinematography: Apurba Kishore Bir
- Edited by: Ravi Patnaik
- Music by: Hariprasad Chaurasia; Bhubaneswar Mishra
- Release date: 1974
- Running time: 118 minutes
- Country: India
- Language: Hindi

27 Down is a 1974 Indian drama film directed by Awtar Krishna Kaul, starring Raakhee and M.K. Raina. The film is based on the Hindi novel Athara Sooraj Ke Paudhe, by Ramesh Bakshi, about a railways employee who meets a girl on the train. The film's music was performed by classical musicians Hariprasad Chaurasia and Bhubaneswar Mishra, while the production design was by Bansi Chandragupta.

At the 21st National Film Awards, the film won the Award for Best Feature Film in Hindi as well as Best Cinematography, for Apurba Kishore Bir. The film's director Avatar Kaul died in an accident the same week the awards were announced. It was his only film.

== Plot ==
The film is set on 27 Down, the Bombay-Varanasi Express, Sanjay (M.K. Raina) is on a pilgrimage journey to Varanasi (Banaras), and remembers his life in flashbacks. Sanjay gives up his dreams to become an artist, in order to support his family he takes up his father's profession of railways employee. He spends his days as a railways ticket checker, till he meets a Life Insurance Corporation employee, Shalini (Raakhee), on the suburban train. After a few more meetings, they fall in love, and Sanjay starts seeing life differently, but when his father finds about their relationship, he fixes his marriage with some other girl.

== Cast ==
- Raakhee as Shalini
- M.K. Raina as Sanjay
- Rekha Sabnis as Sanjay's Wife
- Om Shivpuri as Anna (Sanjay's father)
- Madhavi Manjula as Aka (Sanjay's mother)
- Sadhu Meher
- Sudhir Dalvi as Sanjay's friend
- Nilesh Vellani as young Sanjay

== Music ==
1. "Chuk Chuk Chuk" - Ravi Kichlu

== Special Mention ==
27 Down is featured in Avijit Ghosh's book, 40 Retakes: Bollywood Classics You May have Missed. He wrote the film explores urban alienation just like French writer Albert Camus did in his novels; something no Hindi film had done before. Cinematographer AK Bir's camera travels inside the mind of the protagonist, he also said.

== Production ==
The film was shot on location on Bhusaval railway station, steam yard, suburbs of railway premises and railway quarter for some scenes while other major parts at Mumbai trains, platforms, and at Mumbai's Victoria Terminus station, suburbs of Mumbai, the cinematographer of the film, Apurba Kishore Bir was 22 years old when he got the project, he shot 70 percent of the film using a hand-held camera, inspired by The Battle of Algiers, a 1966 war film with an aim to put the camera right in the conflict, he shot with wide lenses rather than zooms. Bir chose to shoot the film in black and white, as he wanted stark contrasts. As it was difficult to control across crowd, most of the film's platform scenes were shot in the night, or at side platforms, and extras made it look like a busy time.
