= Bombay Talkie =

1970 film

- Directed by: James Ivory
- Written by: Ruth Prawer Jhabvala; James Ivory
- Produced by: Ismail Merchant
- Starring: Shashi Kapoor; Jennifer Kendal; Aparna Sen; Zia Mohyeddin; Utpal Dutt
- Cinematography: Subrata Mitra
- Music by: Shankar–Jaikishan
- Production company: Merchant Ivory Productions
- Release date: 20 November 1970
- Running time: 112 minutes
- Countries: United States; India
- Language: English
- Budget: est. ₹110 lakh
- Box office: est. ₹55 lakh

Bombay Talkie is a 1970 film by Merchant Ivory Productions, with a screenplay by Ruth Prawer Jhabvala and James Ivory.

== Plot ==
Lucia Lane is a British author who is researching the Bollywood film industry. She falls in love and has an affair with Vikram, a famous Bollywood actor. The plot is complicated by the fact that Vikram is married, and his friend, Hari, is in love with Lucia.

== Cast ==
- Shashi Kapoor as Vikram
- Jennifer Kendal as Lucia
- Zia Mohyeddin as Hari
- Aparna Sen as Mala
- Utpal Dutt as Bose
- Florence Ezekiel (Nadira) as Anjana Devi
- Pinchoo Kapoor as Swamiji
- Helen as Heroine in Gold
- Usha Iyer as Cabaret Singer
- Ruby Myers as Gopal Ma
- Prayag Raj as Director
- Jalal Agha as Young Man
- Anwar Ali as Young Man
- Mohan Nadkarni as Young Man
- Sukhdev as Man at Bar
- Amitabh Bachchan as Man Attending Funeral (Uncredited role)

== Production ==
Amitabh Bachchan played a small role in the film. The actor confessed in an interview that Shashi Kapoor chided him for doing the role as he foresaw greater potential in Bachchan and that he left after one day of shoot before he was to say his line.

== Soundtrack ==
Serial	Song title	Singer(s)
1	"Type Writer"	Kishore Kumar and Asha Bhosle
2	"Good Times and Bad Times"	Usha Uthup
3	"Hari Om Tatsat"	Usha Uthup
4	"Tum Mere Pyaar Ki"	Mohammed Rafi

== Additional information ==
The late Awtar Krishna Kaul, who later became an award-winning Hindi film director, moved to India after ending his 14-year stay in the U.S. to work as an assistant director on Bombay Talkie.

== Legacy ==
The film's song "Typewriter, Tip, Tip" (Music: Shankar–Jaikishan, Lyrics: Hasrat Jaipuri) and the opening credits theme were used in the Wes Anderson film The Darjeeling Limited and on Geoff Lloyd's Hometime Show.
