= Shesha Drushti =

- Directed by: Apurba Kishore Bir
- Written by: Apurba Kishore Bir
- Produced by: National Film Development Corporation
- Starring: Sarat Pujari; Neeraj Kabi; Neelam Mukherjee
- Cinematography: Apurba Kishore Bir
- Edited by: Aseem Sinha
- Music by: Bhavdeep Jaipurwale
- Distributed by: National Film Development Corporation
- Release date: 1997
- Running time: 125 minutes
- Country: India
- Language: Odia

Shesha Drushti (transl. The Last Vision) is a 1997 Indian Odia-language film directed by Apurba Kishore Bir, which deals with the disillusionment of a dying freedom fighter who has to bribe a government official to get his son a job.

== Synopsis ==
Kedar Babu is a freedom fighter since the days of Gandhiji's call for the Civil Disobedience Movement. Kedar Babu has lost his wife at an early stage of his marriage. Since then, he has brought up his only son Sangram with all paternal affection. In the town, Sangram stays in the house of a Zamindar Bahudur Surriyakant Singh. During his stay in the Zamindar's house, Sangram experiences the gradual moral setback of a feudal system and the irresponsible and unethical practices in the library. This puts him in a state of dilemma and delusion. In the last moment encounter with his father, Sangram experiences a new perception to life, illuminated with anxiety, suspicion, shock, tragedy, dilemma, wilderness, and the thrill of fulfilling the last wish of his father by enacting the childhood spirit of attaining freedom and subsequently a new vision.

== Cast ==
- Sarat Pujari as Zamindar Bahudur Surriyakant Singh.
- Neeraj Kabi as Sangram
- Neelam Mukherjee

== Music ==
- Bhavdeep Jaipurwale has arranged music for this film

== Awards & Participation ==
- National Film Awards(1998) -Best Feature film In Odia
- Singapore Film Festival
- International Film Festival of India (1998)
- Pyongyang International Film Festival (1998)
