= Dharavi (1992 film) =

Indian film

- Movie poster
- Directed by: Sudhir Mishra
- Written by: Sudhir Mishra
- Produced by: NFDC; Doordarshan
- Starring: Shabana Azmi; Om Puri; Madhuri Dixit; Anil Kapoor
- Cinematography: Rajesh Joshi
- Edited by: Renu Saluja
- Music by: Rajat Dholakia
- Distributed by: Doordarshan
- Release date: 9 April 1992 (India)
- Running time: 113 minutes
- Country: India
- Language: Hindi

Dharavi (City of Dreams) is a 1992 Hindi film, written and directed by Sudhir Mishra.

The film was a joint NFDC-Doordarshan production and went on to winning many awards in the following year, including the 1992 National Film Award for Best Feature Film in Hindi. The film was also invited to the London Film Festival, Mannheim International Film Festival, and Festival 3 Continents Nantes in 1992.

The film stars Shabana Azmi and Om Puri in lead roles, and is set amidst the backdrop of India's largest slums, Dharavi.

== Plot ==
Raj Karan Yadav (Om Puri) is a scrappy taxi driver who somehow scrapes a living in the big metropolis of Bombay, driving a taxi every day. He lives in a one-room tenement with his wife (Shabana Azmi) in Dharavi, one of the world's largest slums. The film follows his fortunes as he tries to break out from the clutches of poverty, devising plans and investing all his money in a dubious schemes which eventually blow out on him, coming under the eye of unscrupulous politician and local goons, yet he still perseveres for his dreams.

== Cast ==
- Shabana Azmi
- Om Puri as Raj Karan Yadav
- Raghuvir Yadav
- Madhuri Dixit
- Anil Kapoor
- Virendra Saxena
- Akhilendra Mishra
- Shakti Singh

== Awards ==
- 1992 National Film Award for Best Feature Film in Hindi
- 1992 National Film Award for Best Music Direction: Rajat Dholakia
- 1992 National Film Award for Best Editing: Renu Saluja
