= Bhubaneswar Mishra (musician) =

Indian musical artist

- Born: 15 July 1927; Paralakhemundi, Odisha, India
- Died: 7 May 1993 (aged 65)
- Genre: Odissi music
- Occupations: music director, composer
- Instrument: Violin
- Formerly of: Hariprasad Chaurasia

Bhubaneswar Mishra (15 July 1927 – 7 May 1993) was an Indian music director, a noted composer of Odissi music (primarily for Odissi dance) and a classical violin player. Born in Paralakhemundi, Mishra was exposed to and developed an inclination towards classical Odissi music at a very young age. Later, he acquired training and proficiency in Odissi, Hindustani and Carnatic styles of playing the violin. In All India Radio Cuttack, he came under the influence of Singhari Shyamsundar Kar, Kashinath Pujapanda, Balakrushna Dash and others. He teamed up with Pandit Hariprasad Chaurasia to score music for Hindi and Odia films.

== Early life ==
Bhubaneswar, was born in Paralakhemundi in the Indian state of Odisha, and from his childhood he was exposed to Odissi music in the traditional temples and mathas of the town, known to be a cultural centre of Odisha. He was a boy who hardly used to speak, hence his parents named him Muni . He started learning classical music at a very early age, learning Odissi music at his hometown. He learned violin from Guru Dwaram Venkatswamy Naidu and Dwaram Narsingh Rao Naidu in both Hindustani and Carnatic style.

== Career ==
Mishra collaborated Kelucharan Mohapatra to popularise Odissi dance and Odissi music across the globe . One of his pioneering work in the genre is scoring music for the Jayadeva's Gitagovinda. He teamed up with Pandit Hariprasad Chaurasia and scored music for many Hindi and Odia films, according to Memories Come Alive. He also composed music with the pseudonym 'SriKumar' .

== Awards and recognition ==
- Odisha Stage Sangeet Natak Academy Award - 1979
- Central Sangeet Natak Academy Award - 1986
