= Diksha (film) =

- Poster
- Directed by: Arun Kaul
- Written by: Arun Kaul
- Screenplay by: Arun Kaul
- Story by: U. R. Ananthamurthy
- Based on: Ghatashraddha by U. R. Ananthamurthy
- Produced by: NFDC; Doordarshan
- Starring: Manohar Singh; Nana Patekar
- Cinematography: Apurba Kishore Bir
- Edited by: Arun Kaul
- Music by: Mohinderjit Singh
- Production company: National Film Development Corporation
- Release date: 1991
- Running time: 120 minutes
- Country: India
- Language: Hindi

Diksha (English: The Initiation) is 1991 Indian Hindi-language film directed by Arun Kaul and is his only feature. The film is based on the Kannada novel Ghatashraddha by U. R. Ananthamurthy.

It was awarded the 1992 National Film Award for Best Feature Film in Hindi and 1992 Filmfare Critics Award for Best Movie. Incidentally, Ghatasraddha was earlier adapted into a 1977 Kannada movie Ghatashraddha, which had won the 1977 National Film Award for Best Feature Film. The film participated in the International Film Festival of India, 1993, and won several international awards, including the Annonay International Film Festival Award, France, 1992; Prix Du Public (Audience Awards); and Best Feature Film in Hindi by Madhya Pradesh Development Corporation, 1992.

== Plot ==
Placed in the early 1930s, Diksha is the story of a guru and his widowed daughter, the head disciple and the novice; the lowly-born Koga, who dreams of learning the intricacy of scriptures.

In a weak moment, during the long absence of her father, the young widow falls for the temptations of the flesh. When she becomes pregnant, her lover refuses to accept his parental responsibility so the widow is forced to have an abortion.

In the ensuing commotion, the father is called back. He is forced to give his decision. He pronounces her dead and performs her "Ghata-Shraddha" (a ritual where an immoral person is ex-communicated, pronounced dead and her last rites performed when the accused is still alive, thus depriving her of all worldly relations).

While the Brahmin society praises the guru, individuals revolt. The head disciple leaves the town; the child-novice goes back to his parents; and the Koga refuses "heaven" and "salvation".

== Cast ==
- Nana Patekar as Koga
- Manohar Singh as Udup Pandit
- Vijay Kashyap as Manjunath
- Ashish Mishra as Nanni
- Rajashri Sawant as Yamuna
- K. K. Raina as Sreekar
- Sulabha Arya as Koga's aunt
