= 14th National Film Awards =

Indian ceremony celebrating cinema of 1966

- Awarded for: Best of Indian cinema in 1966
- Awarded by: Ministry of Information and Broadcasting
- Presented on: 10 October 1967
- Site: Vigyan Bhavan, Delhi, India
- Official website: dff.nic.in

Highlights
- Best Feature Film: Teesri Kasam
- Most awards: Nayak (2)

The 14th National Film Awards, then known as State Awards for Films, presented by Ministry of Information and Broadcasting, India to felicitate the best of Indian Cinema released in 1966. The awards were presented on 10 October 1967 at the Vigyan Bhavan in New Delhi.

== Awards ==
Awards were divided into feature films and non-feature films.

President's Gold Medal for the All India Best Feature Film is now better known as National Film Award for Best Feature Film, whereas President's Gold Medal for the Best Documentary Film is analogous to today's National Film Award for Best Non-Feature Film. For children's films, Prime Minister's Gold Medal is now given as National Film Award for Best Children's Film. At the regional level, President's Silver Medal for Best Feature Film is now given as National Film Award for Best Feature Film in a particular language. Certificate of Merit in all the categories is discontinued over the years.

=== Feature films ===
Feature films were awarded at All India as well as regional level.

==== All India Award ====
Name of Award	Name of Film	Language	Awardee(s)	Awards
Best Feature Film	Teesri Kasam	Hindi	Producer: Shailendra	Gold Medal, ₹20,000 and a plaque
Best Feature Film	Teesri Kasam	Hindi	Director: Basu Bhattacharya	₹10,000 and a plaque
Best Children's Film	Jaise Ko Taise	Hindi	Producer: M. V. Kunte	₹5,000 and a plaque
Best Children's Film	Jaise Ko Taise	Hindi	Director:	Silver Medal
Best Film on Other Social Issues	Irrutinte Athmavu	Malayalam	Producer: P. Bhaskaran	₹5,000 and a plaque
Best Film on Other Social Issues	Irrutinte Athmavu	Malayalam	Director:	Silver Medal
Best Film on National Integration	Subhash Chandra	Hindi	Producer: Ajit Kumar Banerjee	₹5,000 and a plaque
Best Film on National Integration	Subhash Chandra	Hindi	Director: Pijush Bose	Silver Medal
Best Screenplay	Nayak	Bengali	Satyajit Ray	₹10,000

==== Regional Award ====
The awards were given to the best films made in the regional languages of India.

Name of Award	Name of Film	Awardee(s)
Feature Films in Assamese
President's Silver Medal for Best Feature Film	Loti Ghoti	Producer: Director:
Feature Films in Bengali
President's Silver Medal for Best Feature Film	Nayak	Producer: R. D. Banshal & Sharankumari Bansal; Director: Satyajit Ray
Feature Films in Hindi
President's Silver Medal for Best Feature Film	Anupama	Producer: L. B. Lachman; Director: Hrishikesh Mukherjee
Feature Films in Kannada
President's Silver Medal for Best Feature Film	Sandhya Raga	Producer: A. C. Narasimha Murthy; Director: A. C. Narasimha Murthy & S. K. Bhagavan
Feature Films in Malayalam
President's Silver Medal for Best Feature Film	Kunjali Marakkar	Producer: Director:
Feature Films in Marathi
President's Silver Medal for Best Feature Film	Pawana Kathcha Dhondi	Producer: Director:
Feature Films in Oriya
President's Silver Medal for Best Feature Film	Maitra Manisha	Producer: Director:
Feature Films in Tamil
President's Silver Medal for Best Feature Film	Ramu	Producer: A. V. Meiyappan; Director: A. C. Trilogchander
Feature Films in Telugu
President's Silver Medal for Best Feature Film	Rangula Ratnam	Producer: B. N. Reddy; Director: B. N. Reddy

=== Non-feature films ===
Non-feature film awards were given for the documentaries, educational films and film strips made in the country. For the 13th National Film Awards, no award was given in the filmstrip category and only Certificate of Merit was awarded for Educational Films. Following were the awards given for the non-feature films category:

==== Documentaries ====
Name of award	Name of film	Language	Awardee(s)	Awards
All India Certificate of Merit for the Best Documentary Film	Glimpses of West Bengal	English	Producer:	Certificate of Merit and ₹2,000
All India Certificate of Merit for the Best Documentary Film	Glimpses of West Bengal	English	Director:	₹500

==== Educational films ====
Name of award	Name of film	Language	Awardee(s)	Awards
All India Certificate of Merit for the Best Educational Film	Paddy high yielding Varieties	English	Producer: Director:	Certificate of Merit only

=== Awards not given ===
Following were the awards not given as no film was found to be suitable for the award:

- President's Silver Medal for Best Feature Film in English
- President's Silver Medal for Best Feature Film in Punjabi
