= Rajat Dholakia =

- Born: 8 October 1957 (age 69); Rajkot, Gujarat, India
- Genre: Film scoring
- Occupation: Music director
- Years active: 1978–present

Rajat Dholakia is an Indian composer known for his work on Firaaq (2008), Mirch Masala (1987) and Holi (1985). He has been credited with introducing Chhattisgarhi music to Bollywood, and won the 1991 National Film Award for best music director for the film Dharavi directed and written by Sudhir Mishra and in 1992 won award for the film Sunday directed by Pankaj Advani

== Early life and career ==
In childhood he learned the basics of music from his father, Dilip Dholakia. His father was a noted composer for Hindi and Gujarati films, who mastered Hindustani classical music in Bhendibazaar gharana from his guru Aman Ali Khan.

Rajat's main goal was a music and film based technical career, from 1973 he started learning Western music, staff notation and arrangement of music from Western classical teacher Ramprasad Sharma (the father of famous composer Pyarelal Sharma of the Laxmikant–Pyarelal duo).

To know further technicalities of music, he started learning classical guitar from his French friend Mark Salaun (classical and Flemingo guitar master). Then learned arranging film scores for songs and background music from film score arranger Shayamrao Kamble.

He started his career with producing music in Gujarati and Hindi theatricals. He has given music for around 300 plays so far. Juku has contributed sound design and music in around 8,000 national and international commercial ad films and public service films.

== Filmography ==
=== Songs ===
- Holi (1985 film by Ketan Mehta)
- Kafila (film by Sudhanshu Huku)
- Om-Dar-Ba-Dar (1988 film by Kamal Swaroop)
- Yeh Woh Manzil To Nahin (1987 film by Sudhir Mishra)
- Mirch Masala (1987 film by Ketan Mehta)
- Hun Hunshi Hunshilal (1992 film by Sanjiv Shah)
- Tarpan (1994 film by Vikram Singh)
- Dharavi (1992 film by Sudhir Mishra)
- Sunday (film by Pankaj Advani)
- Tunnu Ki Teena (film by Paresh Kamdar)
- Kahaan Ho Tum (2003 film by Vijay Kumar)
- Maharathi (2008 film by Shivam Nair)
- Firaaq (film by Nandita Das)
- The Good Road (2013 film by Gyan Korea)
- Saptapdii (film by Niranjan Thade)
- Fisherwoman and Tuk Tuk (short Film by Suresh Eriyat)

=== Background score and sound design ===
- Brocades of Varanasi (documentary by Paresh Mehta)
- Rabaries of Kutchh (documentary by Paresh Mehta)
- BaanSagar (documentary by Rajendra Jaangle)
- Delinquents (documentary by Vijay Kumar)
- Mujse Dosti Karoge (film by Gopi Desai)
- Figures of Thoughts (1990 short film by Arun Khopkar)
- Colors of Absence (short film by Arun Khopkar)
- TotaNama (animated film by Chandita Mukherjee)
- Before My Eyes (film by Mani Kaul)
- Musician of Gujarat (documentary by Paresh Mehta)
- Sanchaari (documentary by Arun Khopkar)
- Siddheshwari (film by Mani Kaul)
- Maya Memsaab (background music)
- Parinda (associate in background score and sound design, film by Vidhu Vinod Chopra)
- 1942: A Love Story (associate in background score and sound design, film by Vidhu Vinod Chopra)
- Is Raat Ki Subah Nahin (background score, film by Sudhir Mishra)
- Phir Kabhi (background score, film by V. K. Prakash)
