= Apurba Kishore Bir =

Indian film cinematographer, director

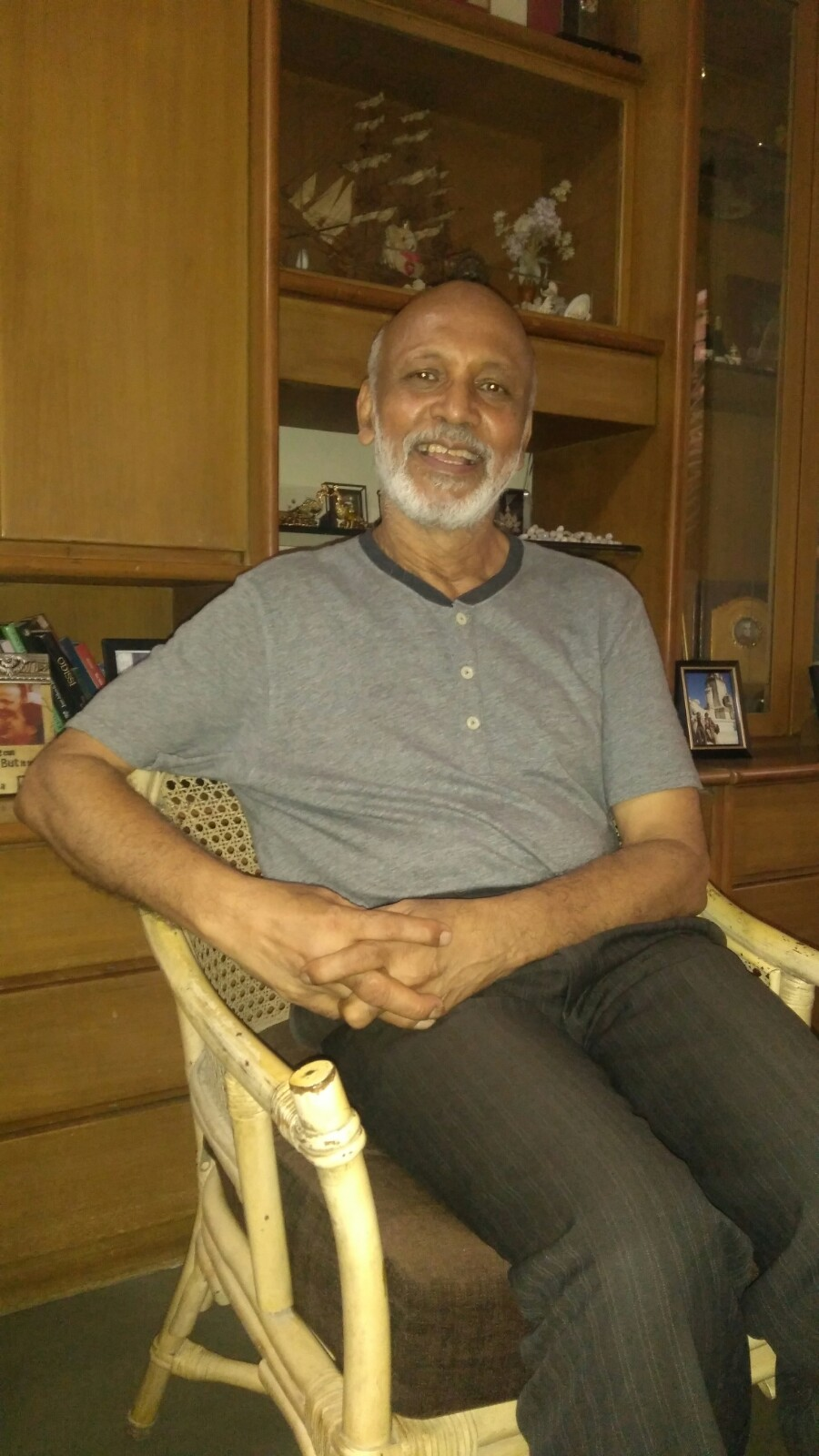
- Bir in 2016
- Born: 1948 (age 77–78); Odisha, India
- Education: Film and Television Institute of India
- Occupations: Cinematographer, Director
- Years active: 1973–present
- Spouse: Prativa Bir (m. 1982)
- Parent: Ajoy Chandra Bir
- Awards: National Film Award for Best Cinematography

Apurba Kishore Bir (born 1948), also known as A. K. Bir, is an Indian film cinematographer, screenwriter and director. An alumnus of the Film and Television Institute of India, Pune, he worked in various Ad-films and documentaries before making his feature-film debut. He won the National Film Award for Best Cinematography for 27 Down, his debut film. His directional debut Aadi Mimansa won the Nargis Dutt Award for Best Feature Film on National Integration. Bir's other directional ventures Lavanya Preeti and Baaja were bestowed with the National Film Award for Best Children's Film. As of 2014, he has won nine National Film Awards—including three for Best Cinematography—and is one of the directors of National Film Development Corporation of India.

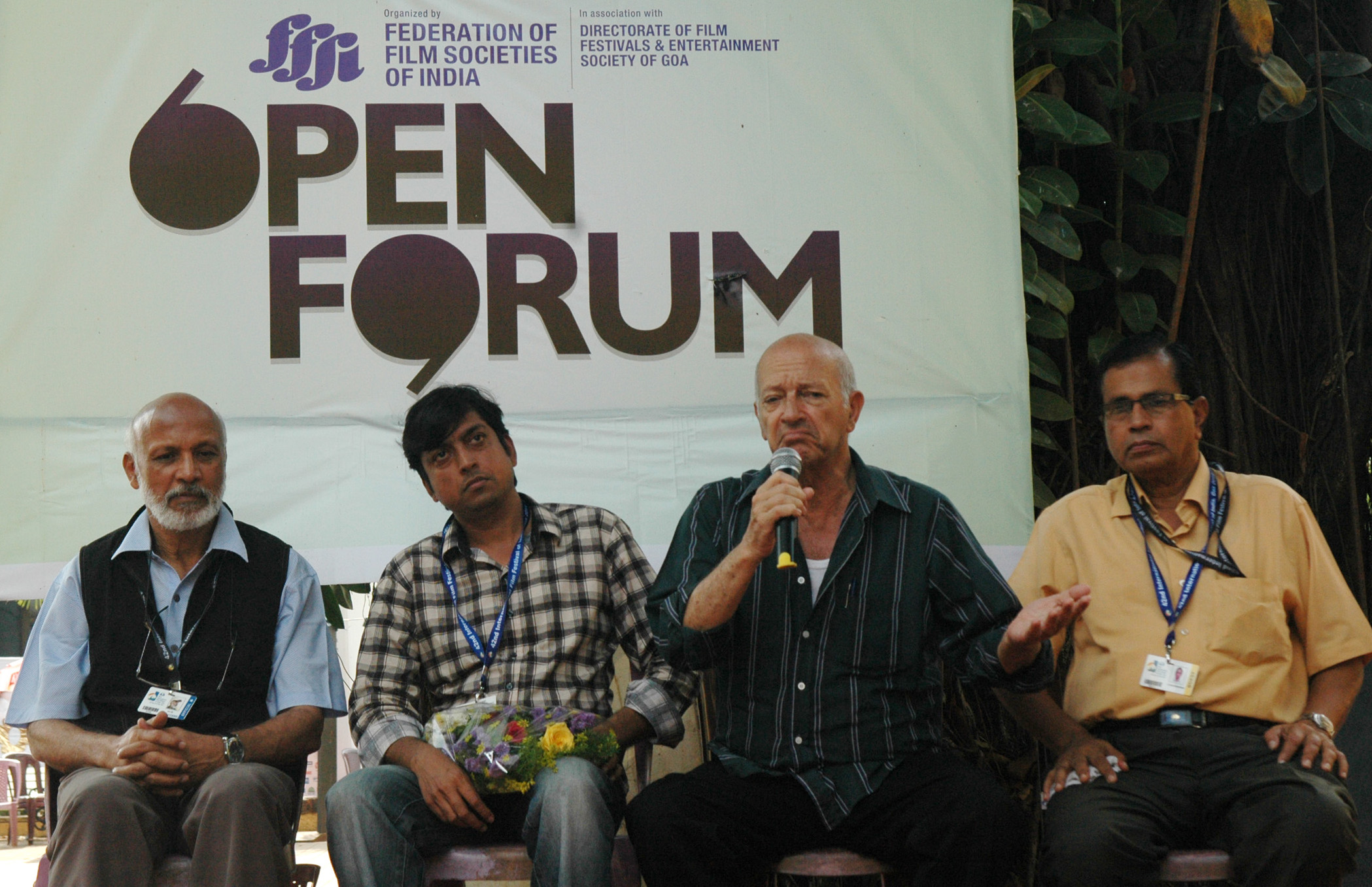
Bir (left) at IFFI 2011

== Biography ==
Born in Balikuti village of Odisha, Bir had a great passion for painting. At the insistence of his father, he joined the Film and Television Institute of India with a specialisation in motion-picture cinematography. After passing out of the institute, he worked on short films and documentaries. 27 Down, his debut feature-film as a cinematographer, won him the Best Cinematographer award at the 21st National Film Awards. Nearly 70 percent of the film was shot using a handheld camera. Bir was one of the first-unit cameramen for Richard Attenborough's Gandhi. He won two more awards for "National Film Award for Best Cinematography" for Daasi (1988) and Aadi Mimansa (1991). The latter also marked his directional debut. It won the Nargis Dutt Award for Best Feature Film on National Integration. As a director Known for his work in Parallel Cinema. Bir's films focused on children as two of his films—Lavanya Preeti and Baaja won the National Film Award for Best Children's Film in 1993 and 2002 respectively. The former received the "Best Asian Film" award at the Osaka International Film Festival in addition to an "International Jury's Critic Award" and a screening at the Berlin International Film Festival. Hamari Beti, for which he wrote the screenplay apart from photography and direction, was screened at the competitive section of the "World Film Section" of Chicago International Film Festival in 2006. In 2012, Bir was appointed as one of the directors of the National Film Development Corporation of India. He headed the "Technical Sub-committee" and was the chairman of the feature film jury of the 45th International Film Festival of India in 2014.

== Filmography ==
Year	Film	Language	Notes
1973	27 Down	Hindi	Debut
1977	Gharonda	Hindi	
1977	Godhuli	Kannada; Hindi	
1978	Ondanondu Kaladalli	Kannada	
1978	Khatta Meetha	Hindi	
1979	Prem Vivah	Hindi	
1979	Dooriyaan	Urdu	
1982	Hamari Bahu Alka	Hindi	
1982	Aadat Se Majboor	Hindi	Screenwriter
1982	Gandhi	English	Part of the first-unit cameramen
1983	Rangula Kala	Telugu	
1983	Tum Laut Aao	Hindi	
1987	Maa Ooru	Telugu	
1988	Ram Avtar	Hindi	
1988	Daasi	Telugu	
1988	Pestonjee	Hindi	
1990	Matti Manushulu	Telugu	
1991	Aadi Mimansa	Hindi; Odia	Directorial debut
1991	Diksha		
1991	Lavanya Preeti		(also screenwriter and director)
1994	Aranyaka		(also screenwriter and director)
1997	Shesha Drushti		(also director)
1998	Nandan		(also director)
2002	Baaja		(also screenwriter and director)
2002	Shararat		
2003	Hari Villu		
2005	Sikhar		
	Hamari Beti		(also screenwriter and director)
2008	Jianta Bhuta		
2010	Huppa Huiyya		

== Awards ==
=== National Film Awards ===
==== Best Cinematography ====
- 1973: 27 Down
- 1988: Daasi
- 1991: Aadi Mimansa

==== Best Regional Film (Oriya) ====
- 1997: Shesha Drushti
- 1998: Nandan

==== Best Children's films ====
- 1991: Lavanya Preeti
- 2002: Baaja

==== Best Film on National Integration ====
1991: Aadi Mimansa

=== Other awards and honours ===
- 1991 – Aravindan Award for Best First Film of a Director Aadi Mimansa
- 1993 – International Jury's Critic Award at Udaipur International Film Festival for Lavanya Preeti
- Jayadeba Award
- Lavanya Preeti – Best Asian Film award at the Osaka International Film Festival.
- 2011 – Taranga Cine Awards for Best Cinematography
- 2013 – Padma Shri
