= Arun Kaul =

Indian filmmaker from Kashmir (1933–2007)

- Born: 12 August 1933
- Died: 21 July 2007 (aged 73); New Delhi, India
- Occupations: Writer, director

Arun Kaul (12 August 1933 – 21 July 2007) was a noted Kashmiri film maker and screenwriter. His film Diksha (1991), won the Filmfare Critics Award for Best Movie for the year 1992. In the same year, he went on to win the Golden Lotus Award for the Best Hindi Film for Diksha (1992) at the National Film Awards India.

He was the screenplay assistant to veteran filmmaker Gulzar, for the films Ijaazat (1987) and Lekin (1990).

He was one of producers of the noted Science Serial TURNING POINT. He also produced a Serial on Kashmir called KASHMIR FILE. Kaul also wrote screenplay for the film Yash Chopra's Chandni (1989). He produced a film named Ek Adhuri Kahani directed by Mrinal Sen, a Bengali film maker in 1972.

He was a key figure in Film Society movement. Kaul died on 21 July 2007, in New Delhi.

== Filmography ==
- Diksha (1991) (director)
- Ijaazat (1987) (screenplay assistant)
- Lekin (1990) (screenplay assistant)
- Chandni (1989) (screenplay)
- Ek Adhuri Kahani (1972) (producer)
- Turning Point (science serial) (producer)
- Kashmir File (serial) (producer)
