= Cinema of India =

- No. of screens: 10,033 (2025)
  - Per capita: 6.8 screens per million (2025)

Produced feature films (2021–2022)
- Total: 2886 ▲

Number of admissions (2025)
- Total: 832,000,000

Gross box office (2025)
- Total: ₹13,395 crore (equivalent to ₹140 billion or US$1.5 billion in 2026)

The cinema of India, consisting of motion pictures made by the Indian film industry, has had a large effect on world cinema since the second half of the 20th century. India does not have a single national film industry for any particular language; instead, Indian cinema is made up of various film industries, each focused on producing films in a specific language, such as Hindi, Telugu, Tamil, Malayalam, Kannada, Bengali, Marathi, Gujarati, Punjabi, Bhojpuri, Assamese, Odia and others.

Major centres of film production across the country include Mumbai, Hyderabad, Chennai, Kolkata, Kochi, Bengaluru, Bhubaneswar-Cuttack, and Guwahati. (Note: Mumbai is the hub of Hindi cinema and Marathi cinema.; Hyderabad is the hub of the Telugu cinema.; Chennai is the hub of Tamil cinema.; Kolkata is the home of Bengali cinema.; Kochi is known as the hub of Malayalam cinema.; Bengaluru is the hub of Kannada cinema.; The twin cities of Bhubaneswar & Cuttack play host to the Odia cinema.; Guwahati is the hub of Assamese cinema) For a number of years, the Indian film industry has ranked first in the world in terms of annual film output. In 2024, Indian cinema earned ₹11, 833 crore ($1.36 billion) at the Indian box-office. Ramoji Film City located in Hyderabad is certified by the Guinness World Records as the largest film studio complex in the world measuring over 1,666 acres (674 ha).

Indian cinema is composed of multilingual and multi-ethnic film art. The term 'Bollywood', often mistakenly used to refer to Indian cinema as a whole, specifically denotes the Hindi-language film industry. Indian cinema, however, is an umbrella term encompassing multiple film industries, each producing films in its respective language and showcasing unique cultural and stylistic elements.

In 2021, Telugu cinema emerged as the largest film industry in India in terms of box office. In 2022, Hindi cinema represented 33% of box office revenue, followed by Telugu representing 20%, Tamil representing 16%, Kannada representing 8%, Malayalam representing 6%, and Marathi representing 3%, with Punjabi, Bengali and Gujarati film industries representing 1% each based on revenue. As of 2022, the combined revenue of South Indian film industries has surpassed that of the Mumbai-based Hindi-language film industry (Bollywood). As of 2022, Telugu cinema leads Indian cinema with 23.3 crore (233 million) tickets sold, followed by Tamil cinema with 20.5 crore (205 million) and Hindi cinema with 18.9 crore (189 million).

Indian cinema is a global enterprise, and its films have attracted international attention and acclaim throughout South Asia. Since talkies began in 1931, Hindi cinema has led in terms of box office performance, but in recent years it has faced stiff competition from Telugu cinema. Overseas Indians account for 12% of the industry's revenue.

== History ==
The history of cinema in India extends to the beginning of the film era. Following the public screening of the Lumière brothers' and Robert Paul's moving pictures in London in late 1895 and early 1896, respectively, commercial cinematography became a worldwide sensation and these films were shown in Bombay (now Mumbai) that same year.

=== Silent era (1890s–1920s) ===
From 1913 to 1931, all the movies made in India were silent films, which had no sound and had intertitles.

History of Indian cinema

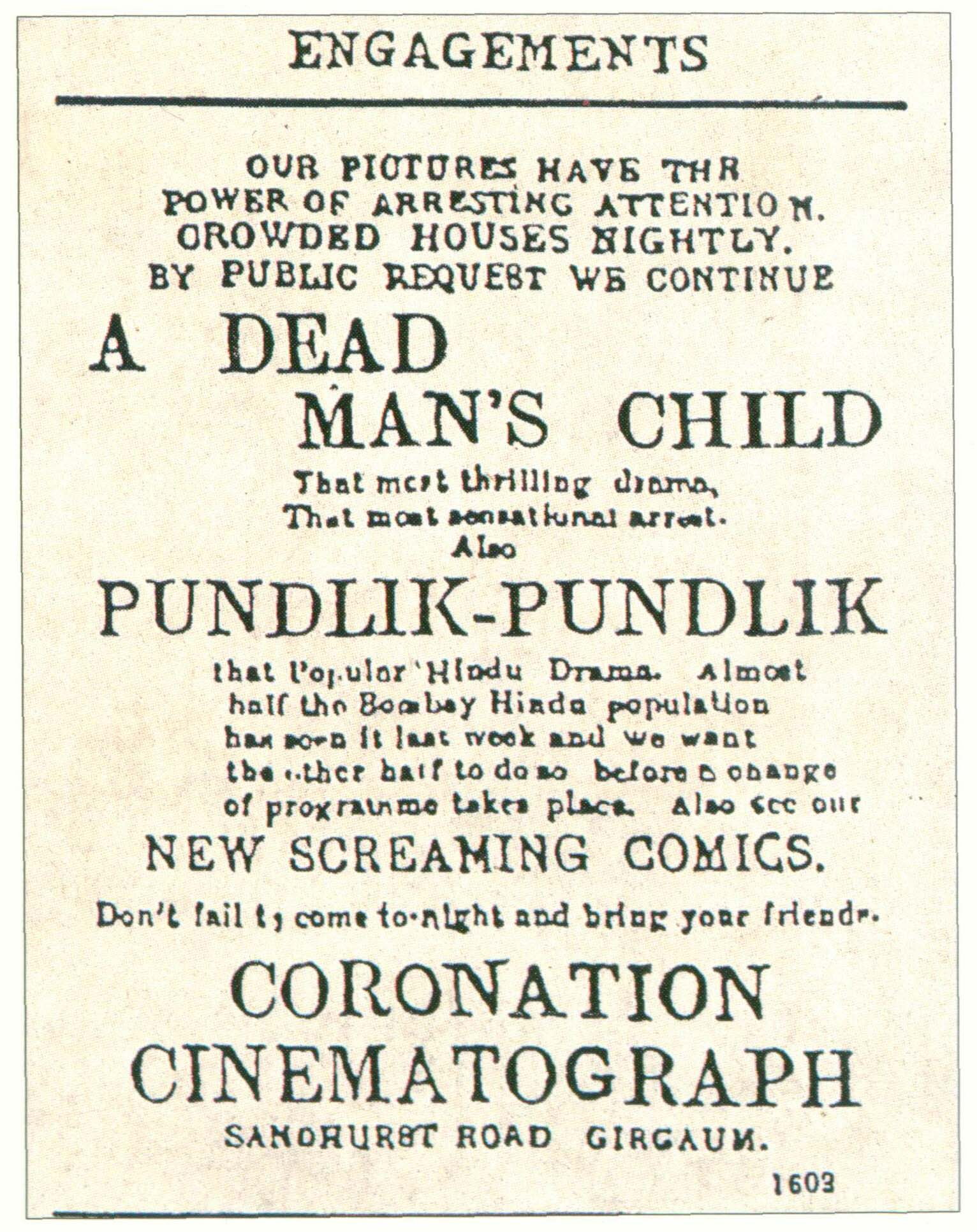
Newspaper ad for Shree Pundalik

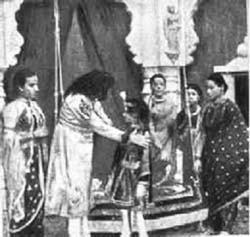
A scene from Raja Harishchandra

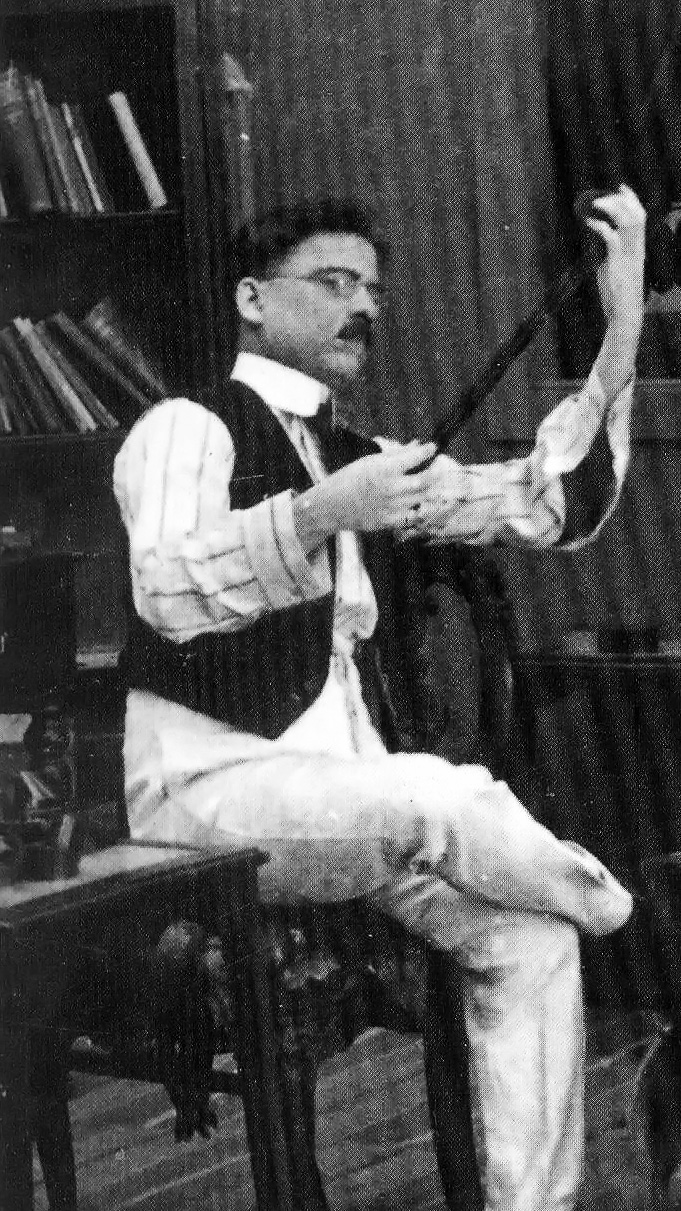
Dadasaheb Phalke, c. 1930s

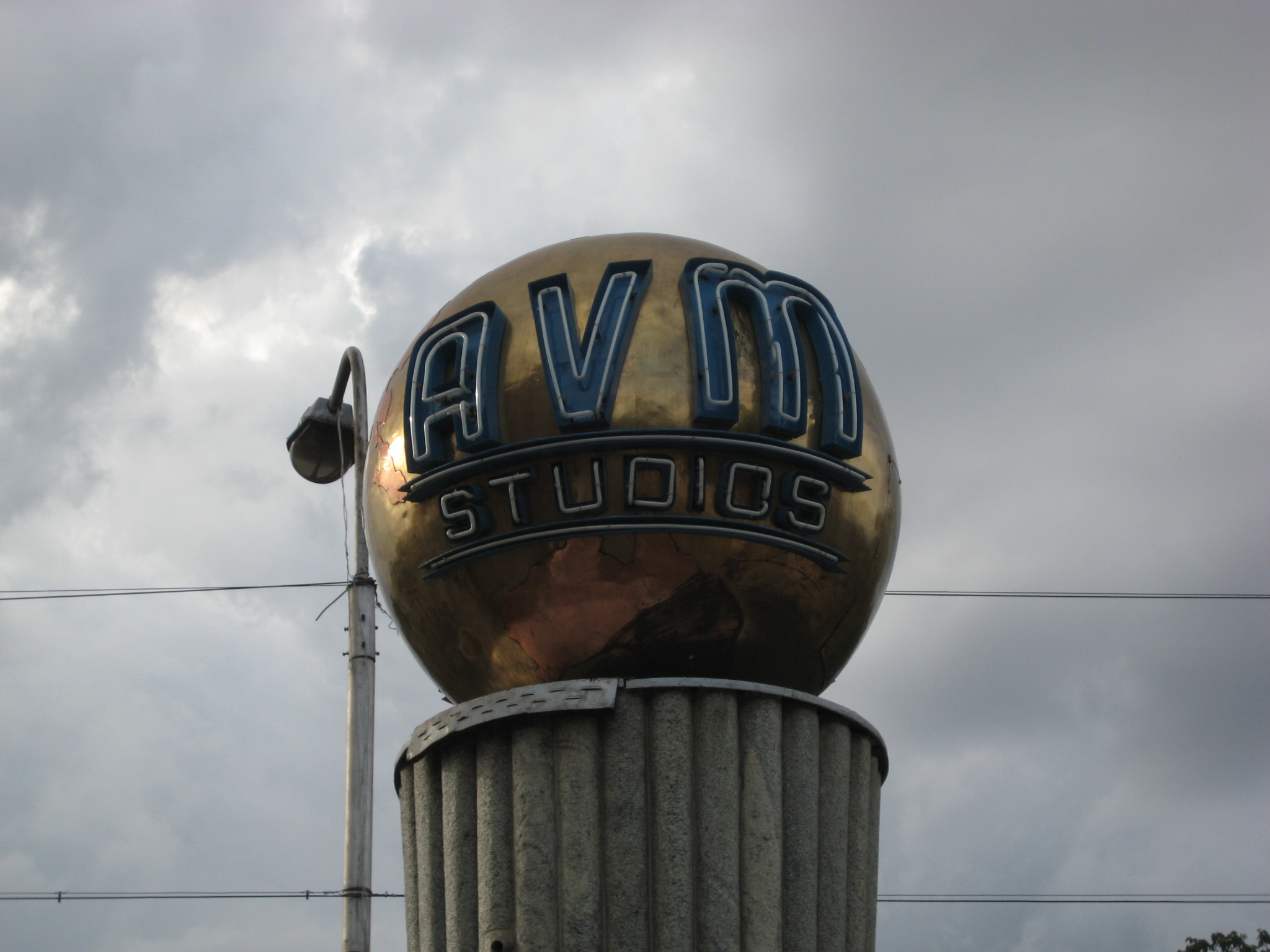
AVM Studios globe

In 1913, Dadasaheb Phalke released Raja Harishchandra (1913) in Bombay, the first film made in India. It was a silent film incorporating English, Marathi, and Hindi intertitles. Films steadily gained popularity across India as affordable entertainment for the masses (admission as low as an anna [one-sixteenth of a rupee] in Bombay). Young producers began to incorporate elements of Indian social life and culture into cinema, others brought new ideas from across the world. Global audiences and markets soon became aware of India's film industry.

In 1927, the British government, to promote the market in India for British films over American ones, formed the Indian Cinematograph Enquiry Committee. This committee failed to support the intended recommendations for promoting British film, instead recommending support for the fledgling Indian film industry. As a result, their suggestions were set aside.

=== Sound era ===
The first Indian sound film was Alam Ara (1931) made by Ardeshir Irani.

The first film studio in South India, Durga Cinetone, was built in 1936 by Nidamarthi Surayya in Rajahmundry, Andhra Pradesh. The advent of sound to Indian cinema launched musicals such as Indra Sabha and Devi Devyani, marking the beginning of song-and-dance in Indian films. By 1935, studios emerged in major cities such as Madras, Calcutta and Bombay as filmmaking became an established industry, exemplified by the success of Devdas (1935). The first colour film made in India was Kisan Kanya (1937, Moti B).

Swamikannu Vincent, who had built the first cinema of South India in Coimbatore, introduced the concept of "tent cinema" in which a tent was erected on a stretch of open land to screen films. The first of its kind was in Madras and was called Edison's Grand Cinema Megaphone, named for the electric carbons used in motion picture projectors. Bombay Talkies opened in 1934 and Prabhat Studios in Pune began production of Marathi films. However, while Indian filmmakers sought to tell important stories, the British Raj banned Wrath (1930) and Raithu Bidda (1938) for broaching the subject of the Indian independence movement.

The Indian Masala film—a term used for mixed-genre films that combined song, dance, romance, etc.—arose following the Second World War. During the 1940s, cinema in South India accounted for nearly half of India's cinema halls, and cinema came to be viewed as an instrument of cultural revival. The Indian People's Theatre Association (IPTA), an art movement with a communist inclination, began to take shape through the 1940s and the 1950s. IPTA plays, such as Nabanna (1944), prepared the ground for realism in Indian cinema, as seen in the films Mother India (1957) and Pyaasa (1957), among India's most recognisable cinematic productions.

Following independence, the 1947 partition of India divided the nation's assets and a number of studios moved to Pakistan. Partition became an enduring film subject thereafter. The Indian government had established a Films Division by 1948, which eventually became one of the world's largest documentary film producers.

=== Golden Age (late 1940s–1960s) ===
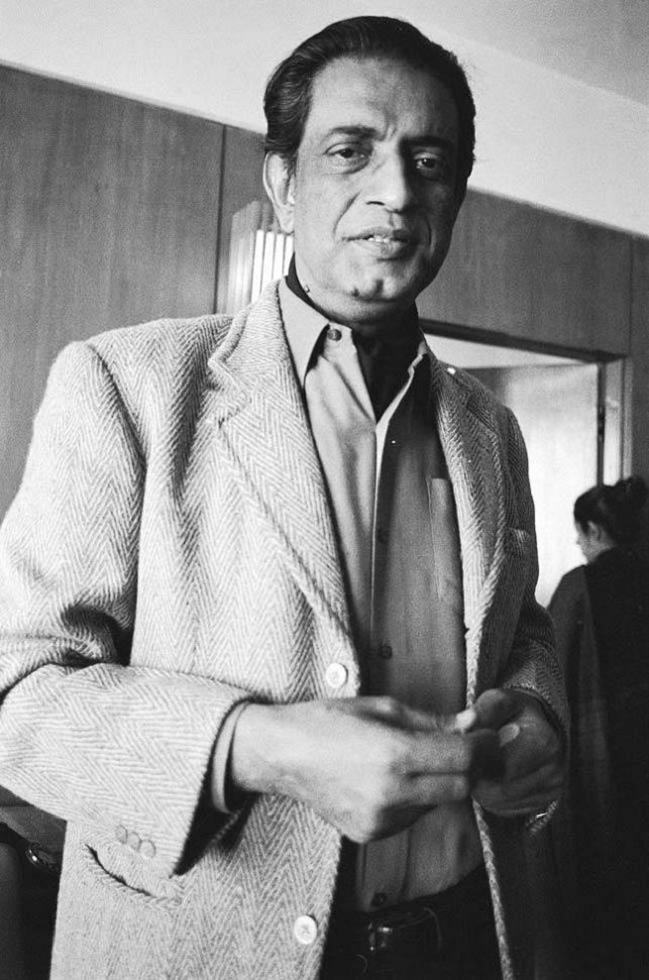
Satyajit Ray is recognised as one of the greatest filmmakers of the 20th century.

The period from the late 1940s to the early 1960s is regarded by film historians as the Golden Age of Indian cinema. This period saw the emergence of the parallel cinema movement, which emphasised social realism. Mainly led by Bengalis, it laid the foundations for Indian neorealism.

The Apu Trilogy (1955–1959, Satyajit Ray) won prizes at several major international film festivals and firmly established the parallel cinema movement. It was influential on world cinema and led to a rush of coming-of-age films in art house theatres.

During the 1950s, Indian cinema reportedly became the world's second largest film industry, earning a gross annual income of ₹250 million (equivalent to ₹29 billion or US$310 million in 2026) in 1953. The government created the Film Finance Corporation (FFC) in 1960 to provide financial support to filmmakers. While serving as Information and Broadcasting Minister of India in the 1960s, Indira Gandhi supported the production of off-beat cinema through the FFC. Commercial Hindi cinema began thriving, including acclaimed films Pyaasa (1957) and Kaagaz Ke Phool (1959, Guru Dutt) Awaara (1951) and Shree 420 (1955, Raj Kapoor). These films expressed social themes mainly dealing with working-class urban life in India.

Epic film Mother India (1957, Mehboob Khan) was the first Indian film to be nominated for the US-based Academy of Motion Picture Arts and Sciences' Academy Award for Best Foreign Language Film and defined the conventions of Hindi cinema for decades. It spawned a new genre of dacoit films. Gunga Jumna (1961, Dilip Kumar) was a dacoit crime drama about two brothers on opposite sides of the law, a theme that became common in Indian films in the 1970s.

Actor Dilip Kumar rose to fame in the 1950s, and was the biggest Indian movie star of the time. He was a pioneer of method acting, predating Hollywood method actors such as Marlon Brando. Much like Brando's influence on New Hollywood actors, Kumar inspired Hindi actors, including Amitabh Bachchan, Naseeruddin Shah, Shah Rukh Khan and Nawazuddin Siddiqui.

=== 1970s–present ===
By 1986, India's annual film output had increased to 833 films annually, making India the world's largest film producer. Hindi film production of Bombay, the largest segment of the industry, became known as "Bollywood".

Summary of the 2022 box office revenues.
1. Hindi (33.0%)
2. Telugu (20.0%)
3. Tamil (16.0%)
4. Bengali (10.0%)
5. Kannada (8.00%)
6. Malayalam (6.00%)
7. Other (7.00%)

By 1996, the Indian film industry had an estimated domestic cinema viewership of 600 million people, establishing India as one of the largest film markets, with the largest regional industries being Hindi, Telugu, and Tamil films. In 2001, in terms of ticket sales, Indian cinema sold an estimated 3.6 billion tickets annually across the globe, compared to Hollywood's 2.6 billion tickets sold.

==== Hindi ====
Realistic parallel cinema continued throughout the 1970s, practised in many Indian film cultures. The FFC's art film orientation came under criticism during a Committee on Public Undertakings investigation in 1976, which accused the body of not doing enough to encourage commercial cinema.

Hindi commercial cinema continued with films starring Rajesh Khanna such as Aradhana (1969), Sachaa Jhutha (1970), Haathi Mere Saathi (1971), Anand (1971), Kati Patang (1971), Amar Prem (1972), Dushman (1972) and Daag (1973).

By the early 1970s, Hindi cinema was experiencing thematic stagnation, dominated by musical romance films. Screenwriter duo Salim–Javed (Salim Khan and Javed Akhtar) revitalised the industry. Their work led to the "angry young man" film movement, with the gritty, violent, Bombay underworld crime films Zanjeer (1973) and Deewaar (1975). They reinterpreted the rural themes of Mother India and Gunga Jumna in an urban context reflecting 1970s India, channelling the growing discontent and disillusionment among the masses, unprecedented growth of slums and urban poverty, corruption and crime, as well as anti-establishment themes. This resulted in their creation of the "angry young man", personified by Amitabh Bachchan, who reinterpreted Kumar's performance in Gunga Jumna and gave a voice to the urban poor. The women on the other hand were shown as ones who have adopted western values and outfits especially by heroines like Parveen Babi (who was featured on the cover of Time magazine for a story on Bollywood's success) and Zeenat Aman.

By the mid-1970s, Bachchan's position as a lead actor was solidified by crime-action films Zanjeer and Sholay (1975). The devotional classic Jai Santoshi Ma (1975) was made on a low budget and became a box office success and a cult classic. Another important film was Deewaar (1975, Yash Chopra), a crime film with brothers on opposite sides of the law which Danny Boyle described as "absolutely key to Indian cinema".

The term "Bollywood" was coined in the 1970s, when the conventions of commercial Bombay-produced Hindi films were established. Key to this was masala film genre, which combines elements of action, comedy, romance, drama, melodrama and musical. Their film Yaadon Ki Baarat (1973) has been identified as the first masala film and the first quintessentially Bollywood film. Masala films made Bachchan the biggest Bollywood movie star of the period. Another landmark was Amar Akbar Anthony (1977, Manmohan Desai). Desai further expanded the genre in the 1970s and 1980s.

Commercial Hindi cinema grew in the 1980s, with films such as Ek Duuje Ke Liye (1981), Disco Dancer (1982), Himmatwala (1983), Tohfa (1984), Naam (1986), Mr India (1987), and Tezaab (1988).

In the late 1980s, Hindi cinema experienced another period of stagnation, with a decline in box office turnout, due to increasing violence, decline in musical melodic quality, and rise in video piracy, leading to middle-class family audiences abandoning theatres. The turning point came with Indian blockbuster Disco Dancer (1982) which began the era of disco music in Indian cinema. Lead actor Mithun Chakraborty and music director Bappi Lahiri had the highest number of mainstream Indian hit movies that decade. At the end of the decade, Yash Chopra's Chandni (1989) created a new formula for Bollywood musical romance films, reviving the genre and defining Hindi cinema in the years that followed. The film consolidated Sridevi's position as the biggest female star of the era. Commercial Hindi cinema grew in the late 1980s and 1990s, with the release of Mr. India (1987), Qayamat Se Qayamat Tak (1988), Chaalbaaz (1989), Maine Pyar Kiya (1989), Khuda Gawah (1992), Lootere (1993), Khalnayak (1993), Darr (1993), Hum Aapke Hain Koun..! (1994), Dilwale Dulhaniya Le Jayenge (1995), Jeet (1996), Dil To Pagal Hai (1997), Pyar Kiya Toh Darna Kya (1998) and Kuch Kuch Hota Hai (1998). Cult classic Bandit Queen (1994) directed by Shekhar Kapur received international recognition and controversy.

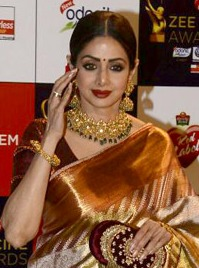
Sridevi (2012) was regarded as the most popular female star in Indian cinema.

In the late 1990s, there was a resurgence of parallel cinema in Bollywood, largely due to the critical and commercial success of crime films such as Satya (1998) and Vaastav (1999). These films launched a genre known as "Mumbai noir", reflecting social problems in the city. Ram Gopal Varma directed the Indian Political Trilogy, and the Indian Gangster Trilogy; film critic Rajeev Masand had labelled the latter series as one of the "most influential movies of Bollywood. The first instalment of the trilogy, Satya, was also listed in CNN-IBN's 100 greatest Indian films of all time.

Since the 1990s, the three biggest Bollywood movie stars have been the "Three Khans": Aamir Khan, Shah Rukh Khan, and Salman Khan. Combined, they starred in the top ten highest-grossing Bollywood films, and have dominated the Indian box office since the 1990s. Shah Rukh Khan was the most successful for most of the 1990s and 2000s, while Aamir Khan has been the most successful since the late 2000s; according to Forbes, Shah Rukh Khan is "arguably the world's biggest movie star" as of 2017, due to his immense popularity in India and China. Other notable Hindi film stars of recent decades include Govinda Ajay Devgn, Akshay Kumar, Anil Kapoor, Hrithik Roshan, Manoj Bajpayee, Irrfan Khan,Sanjay Dutt, Akshaye Khanna, Sunil Shetty and Sunny Deol among males and Aishwarya Rai, Juhi Chawla, Karisma Kapoor, Kajol, Madhuri Dixit, Preity Zinta, Rani Mukerji, Raveena Tandon, Sridevi and Tabu among females.

Haider (2014, Vishal Bhardwaj), the third instalment of the Indian Shakespearean Trilogy after Maqbool (2003) and Omkara (2006), won the People's Choice Award at the 9th Rome Film Festival in the Mondo Genere making it the first Indian film to achieve this honour.

The 2000s and 2010s also saw the rise of a new generation of popular actors like Shahid Kapoor, Ranbir Kapoor, Ranveer Singh, Ayushmann Khurrana, Rajkumar Rao, John Abraham, Varun Dhawan, Sidharth Malhotra, Sushant Singh Rajput, Kartik Aaryan, Arjun Kapoor, Aditya Roy Kapur and Tiger Shroff, as well as actresses like Vidya Balan, Priyanka Chopra, Kareena Kapoor, Katrina Kaif, Kangana Ranaut, Deepika Padukone, Sonam Kapoor, Anushka Sharma, Shraddha Kapoor, Kiara Advani, Parineeti Chopra and Kriti Sanon with Rani, Balan, and Ranaut and gaining wide recognition for successful female-centric films such as Black (2005), The Dirty Picture (2011), Kahaani (2012), Queen (2014) and Tanu Weds Manu Returns (2015). Whereas Bipasha Basu and Vikram Bhatt created a new legacy of Horror Cinema in India with the highest grossing supernatural films like Raaz(2002) and Raaz 3(2012).

Salim–Javed were highly influential in South Indian cinema. In addition to writing two Kannada films, many of their Bollywood films had remakes produced in other regions, including Tamil, Telugu and Malayalam cinema. While the Bollywood directors and producers held the rights to their films in Northern India, Salim–Javed retained the rights in South India, where they sold remake rights for films such as Zanjeer, Yaadon Ki Baarat and Don. Several of these remakes became breakthroughs for actor Rajinikanth.

Sridevi is widely regarded as the first female superstar of Indian cinema due to her pan-Indian appeal with equally successful careers in Hindi, Tamil, Malayalam, Kannada and Telugu cinema. She is the only Bollywood actor to have starred in a top 10 grossing film each year of her active career (1983–1997).

In 2024, regional film industries collectively accounted for around 60 % of India's box office share, with Hindi cinema's contribution falling to 40 %, reflecting a notable shift in audience preferences toward regional-language films including Malayalam, Tamil, Telugu, and Gujarati cinema

==== Telugu ====
K. V. Reddy's Mayabazar (1957) is a landmark film in Indian cinema, a classic of Telugu cinema that inspired generations of filmmakers. It blends myth, fantasy, romance and humour in a timeless story, captivating audiences with its fantastical elements. The film excelled in various departments like cast performances, production design, music, cinematography and is particularly revered for its use of technology. The use of special effects, innovative for the 1950s, like the first illusion of moonlight, showcased technical brilliance.. Powerful performances and relatable themes ensure Mayabazar stays relevant, a classic enjoyed by new generations. On the centenary of Indian cinema in 2013, CNN-IBN included Mayabazar in its list of "100 greatest Indian films of all time". In a poll conducted by CNN-IBN among those 100 films, Mayabazar was voted by the public as the "Greatest Indian film of all time".

K. Viswanath, one of the prominent auteurs of Indian cinema, he received international recognition for his works, and is known for blending parallel cinema with mainstream cinema. His works such as Sankarabharanam (1980) about revitalisation of Indian classical music won the "Prize of the Public" at the Besançon Film Festival of France in the year 1981. Forbes included J. V. Somayajulu's performance in the film on its list of "25 Greatest Acting Performances of Indian Cinema". Swathi Muthyam (1986) was India's official entry to the 59th Academy Awards. Swarna Kamalam (1988) the dance film choreographed by Kelucharan Mohapatra, and Sharon Lowen was featured at the Ann Arbor Film Festival, fetching three Indian Express Awards.

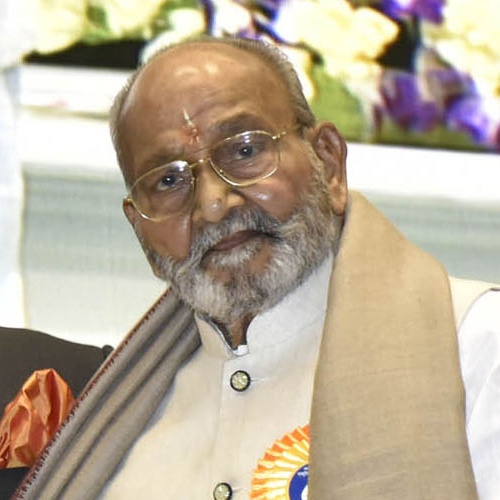
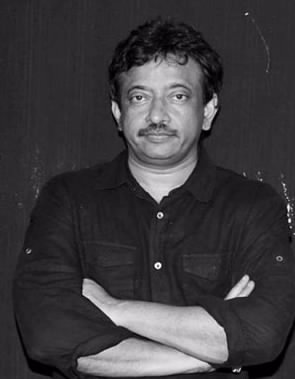
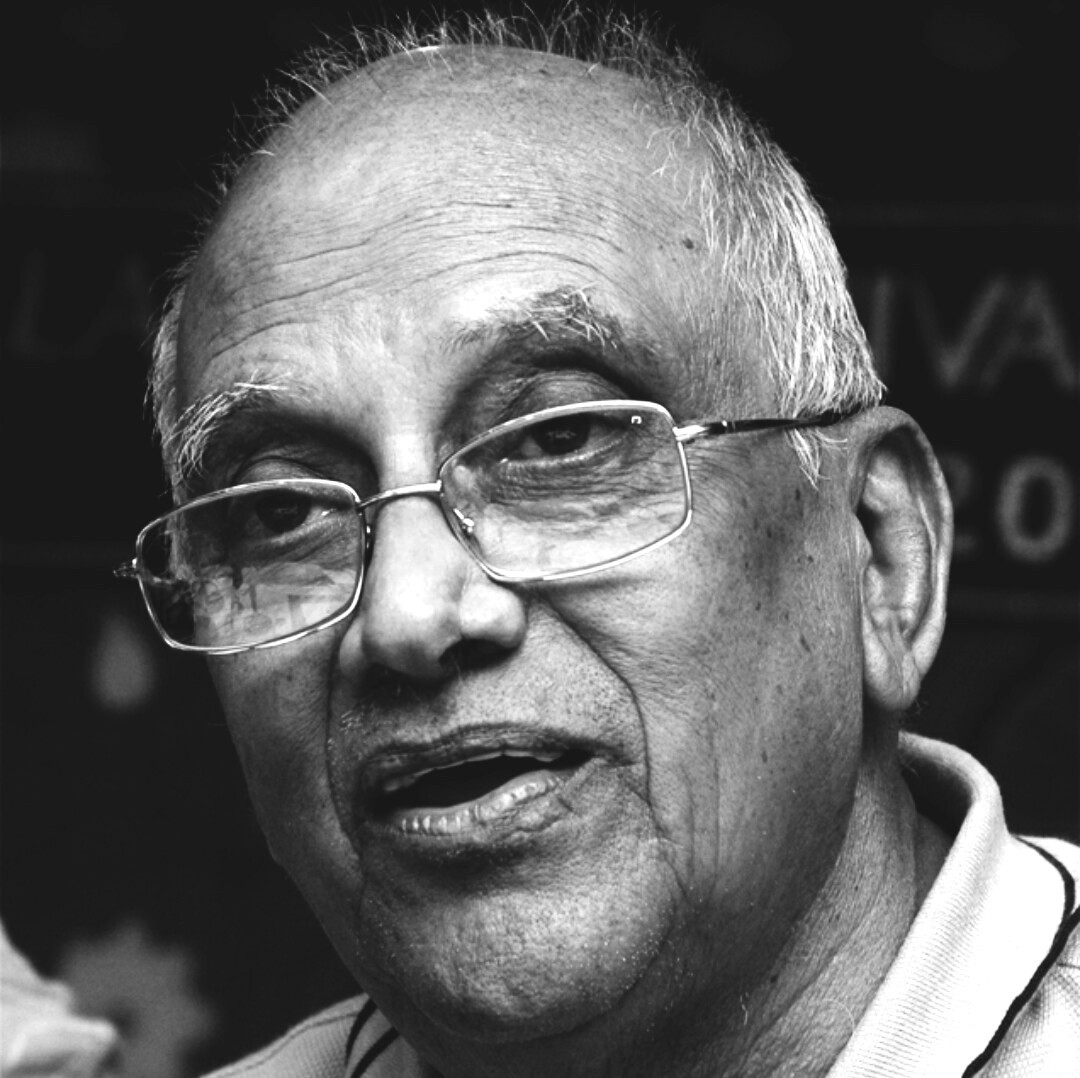
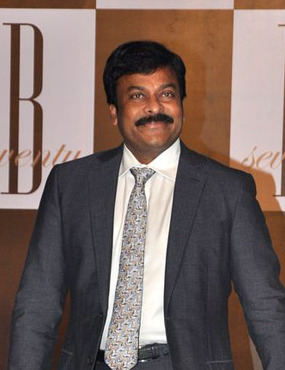
From left to right: K. Viswanath, Ram Gopal Varma, Singeetam Srinivasa Rao and Chiranjeevi

B. Narsing Rao, K. N. T. Sastry, and A. Kutumba Rao garnered international recognition for their works in new-wave cinema. Narsing Rao's Maa Ooru (1992) won the "Media Wave Award" of Hungary; Daasi (1988) and Matti Manushulu (1990) won the Diploma of Merit awards at the 16th and 17th MIFF respectively. Sastry's Thilaadanam (2000) received "New Currents Award" at the 7th Busan; Rajnesh Domalpalli's Vanaja (2006) won "Best First Feature Award" at the 57th Berlinale.

Ram Gopal Varma's Siva (1989), which attained cult following introduced steadicams and new sound recording techniques to Indian films. Siva attracted the young audience during its theatrical run, and its success encouraged filmmakers to explore a variety of themes and make experimental films. Varma introduced road movie and film noir to Indian screen with Kshana Kshanam (1991). Varma experimented with close-to-life performances by the lead actors, which bought a rather fictional storyline a sense of authenticity at a time when the industry was being filled with commercial fillers.

Singeetam Srinivasa Rao introduced time travel to the Indian screen with Aditya 369 (1991). The film dealt with exploratory dystopian and apocalyptic themes, taking the audience through a post-apocalyptic experience via time travel and folklore from 1526 CE, including a romantic subplot. Singeetam Srinivasa Rao was inspired by the classic sci-fi novel The Time Machine.

Chiranjeevi's works such as the social drama film Swayamkrushi (1987), comedy thriller Chantabbai (1986), the vigilante thriller Kondaveeti Donga (1990), the Western thriller Kodama Simham (1990), and the action thriller, Gang Leader (1991), popularised genre films with the highest estimated cinema footfalls. Sekhar Kammula's Dollar Dreams (2000), which explored the conflict between American dreams and human feelings, re-introduced social realism to Telugu film which had stagnated in formulaic commercialism. War drama Kanche (2015, Krish Jagarlamudi) explored the 1944 Nazi attack on the Indian army in the Italian campaign of the Second World War.

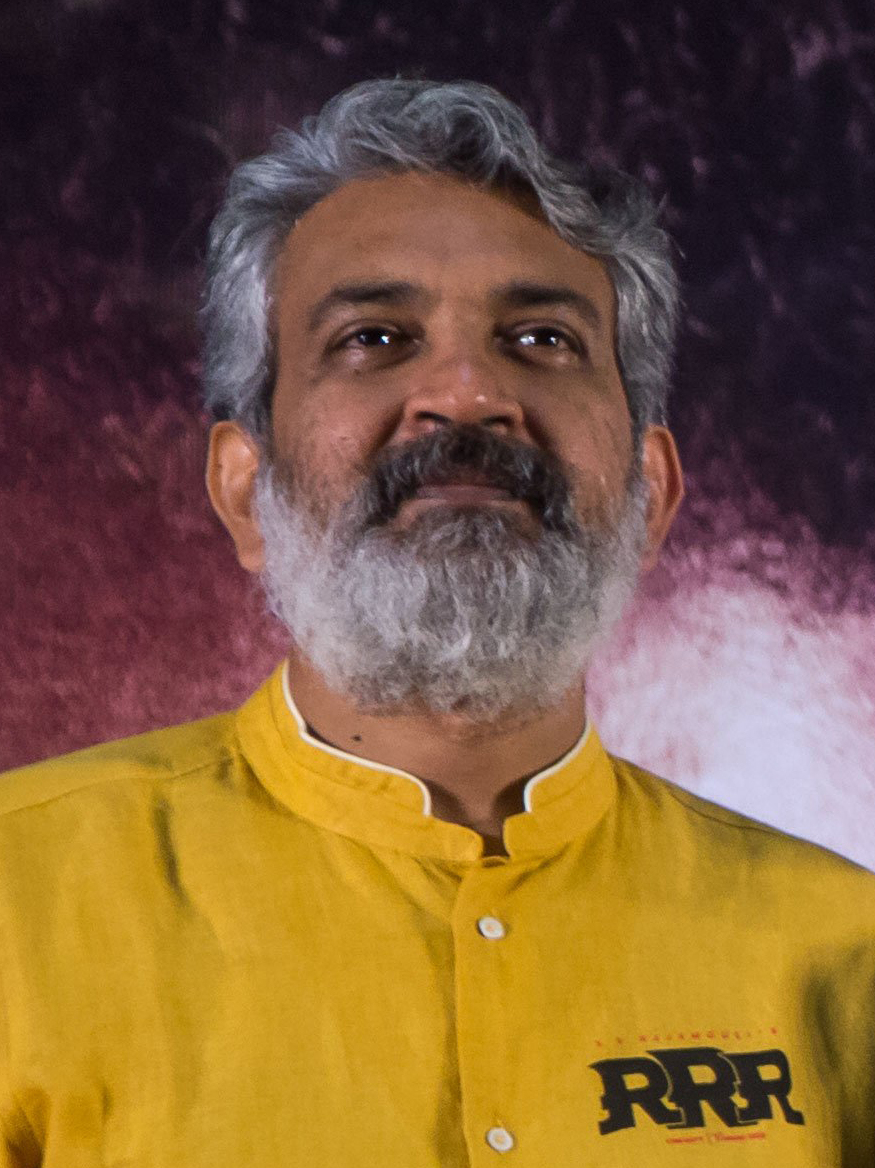
S.S Rajamouli has been described as "the biggest Indian film director ever" and "India's most significant director today".

Pan-Indian film is a term related to Indian cinema that originated with Telugu cinema as a mainstream commercial film appealing to audiences across the country with a spread to world markets. S. S. Rajamouli pioneered the pan-Indian films movement with duology of epic action films Baahubali: The Beginning (2015) and Baahubali 2: The Conclusion (2017), that changed the face of Indian cinema. Baahubali: The Beginning became the first Indian film to be nominated for American Saturn Awards. It received national and international acclaim for Rajamouli's direction, story, visual effects, cinematography, themes, action sequences, music, and performances, and became a record-breaking box office success. The sequel Baahubali 2 (2017) went on to win the American "Saturn Award for Best International Film" & emerged as the second-highest-grossing Indian film of all time.

S.S Rajamouli followed up with the alternate historical film RRR (2022) that received universal critical acclaim for its direction, screenwriting, cast performances, cinematography, soundtrack, action sequences and VFX, which further consolidated the Pan-Indian film market. The film was considered one of the ten best films of the year by the National Board of Review, making it only the seventh non-English language film ever to make it to the list. It also became the first Indian film by an Indian production to win an Academy Award. The film went on to receive several other nominations at the Golden Globe Awards, Critics' Choice Movie Award including Best Foreign Language Film. Films like Pushpa: The Rise, Salaar: Part 1 – Ceasefire and Kalki 2898 AD have further contributed to the pan-Indian film wave.

Actors like Prabhas, Allu Arjun, Ram Charan and N. T. Rama Rao Jr. enjoy a nationwide popularity among the audiences after the release of their respective Pan-Indian films. Film critics, journalists and analysts, such as Baradwaj Rangan and Vishal Menon, have labelled Prabhas as the "first legit Pan-Indian Superstar".

Hindi cinema has been remaking Telugu films since the late 1940s, some of which went on to become landmark films. Between 2000 and 2019, one in every three successful films made in Hindi was either a remake or part of a series. And most of the star actors, have starred in the hit remakes of Telugu films.

==== Tamil ====
Tamil cinema established Madras (now Chennai) as a secondary film production centre in India, used by Hindi cinema, other South Indian film industries, and Sri Lankan cinema. Over the last quarter of the 20th century, Tamil films from India established a global presence through distribution to an increasing number of overseas theatres. The industry also inspired independent filmmaking in Sri Lanka and Tamil diaspora populations in Malaysia, Singapore, and the Western Hemisphere.

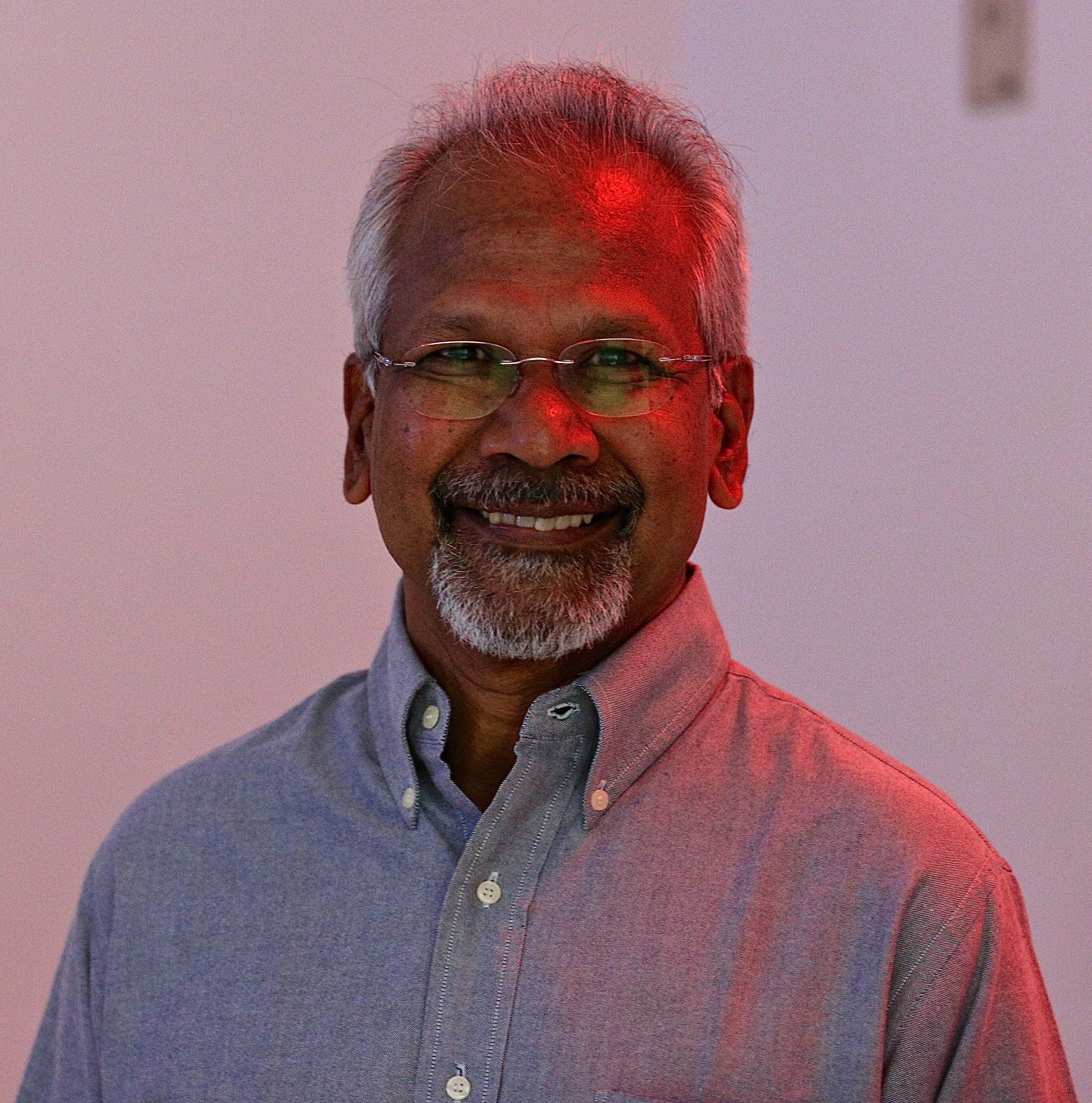
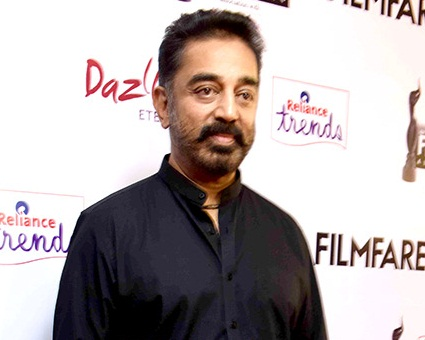
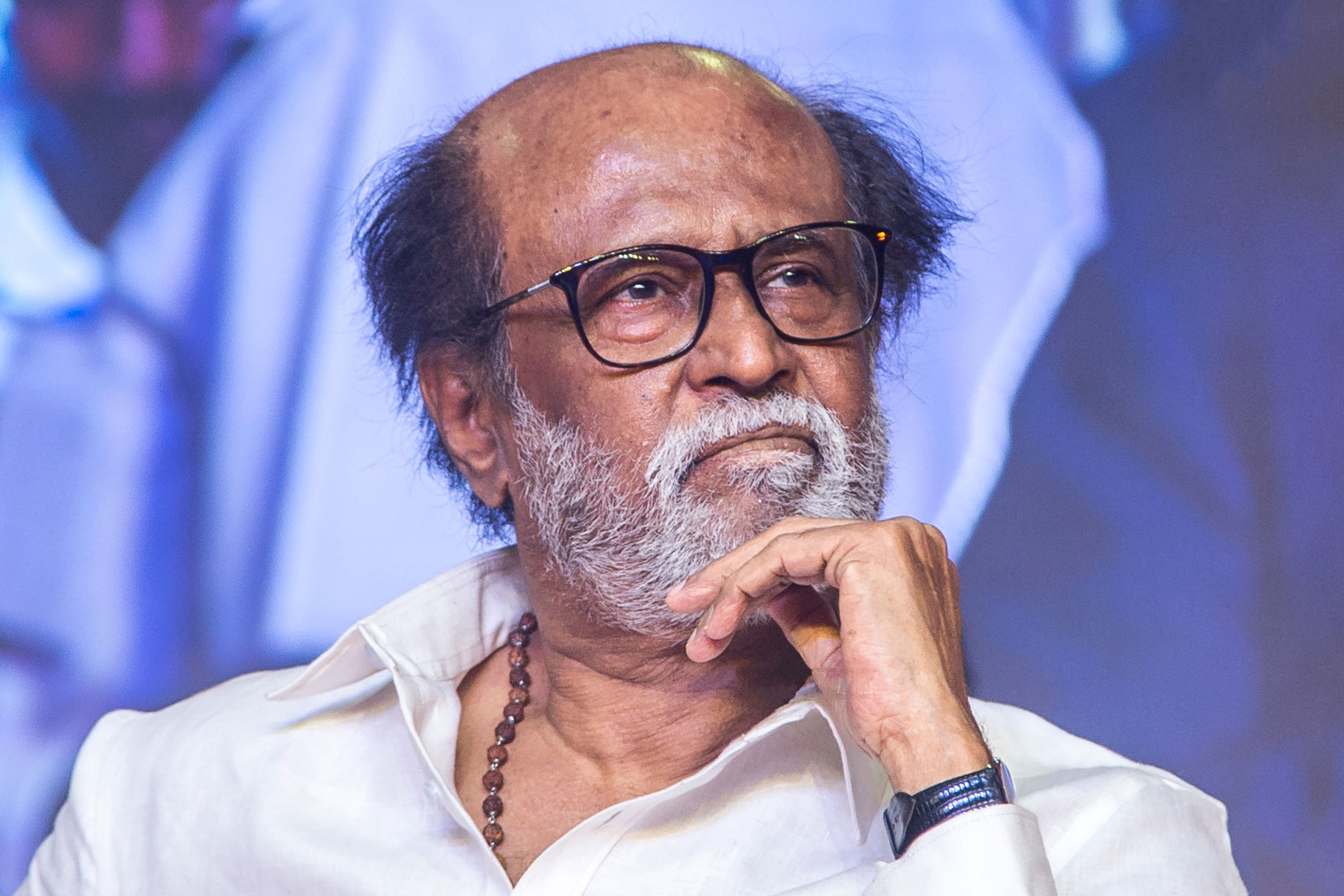
From left to right: Mani Ratnam (film director), Kamal Hasan and Rajinikanth

Marupakkam (1991, K. S. Sethumadhavan) and Kanchivaram (2007) each won the National Film Award for Best Feature Film. Tamil films receive significant patronage in neighbouring Indian states Kerala, Karnataka, Andhra Pradesh, Maharashtra, Gujarat and New Delhi. In Kerala and Karnataka the films are directly released in Tamil but in Andhra Pradesh and Telangana they are generally dubbed into Telugu.

Tamil films have had international success for decades. Since Chandralekha (1948), Muthu (1995) was the second Tamil film to be dubbed into Japanese (as Mutu: Odoru Maharaja) and grossed a record $1.6 million in 1998. In 2010, Enthiran grossed a record $4 million in North America. Tamil-language films appeared at multiple film festivals. Kannathil Muthamittal (Ratnam), Veyyil (Vasanthabalan) and Paruthiveeran (Ameer Sultan), Kanchivaram (Priyadarshan) premiered at the Toronto International Film Festival. Tamil films were submitted by India for the Academy Award for Best Foreign Language Film on eight occasions. Chennai-based music composer A. R. Rahman achieved global recognition with two Academy Awards and is nicknamed as "Isai Puyal" (musical storm) and "Mozart of Madras". Nayakan (1987, Kamal Haasan) was included in Time's All-Time 100 Movies list.

==== Malayalam ====
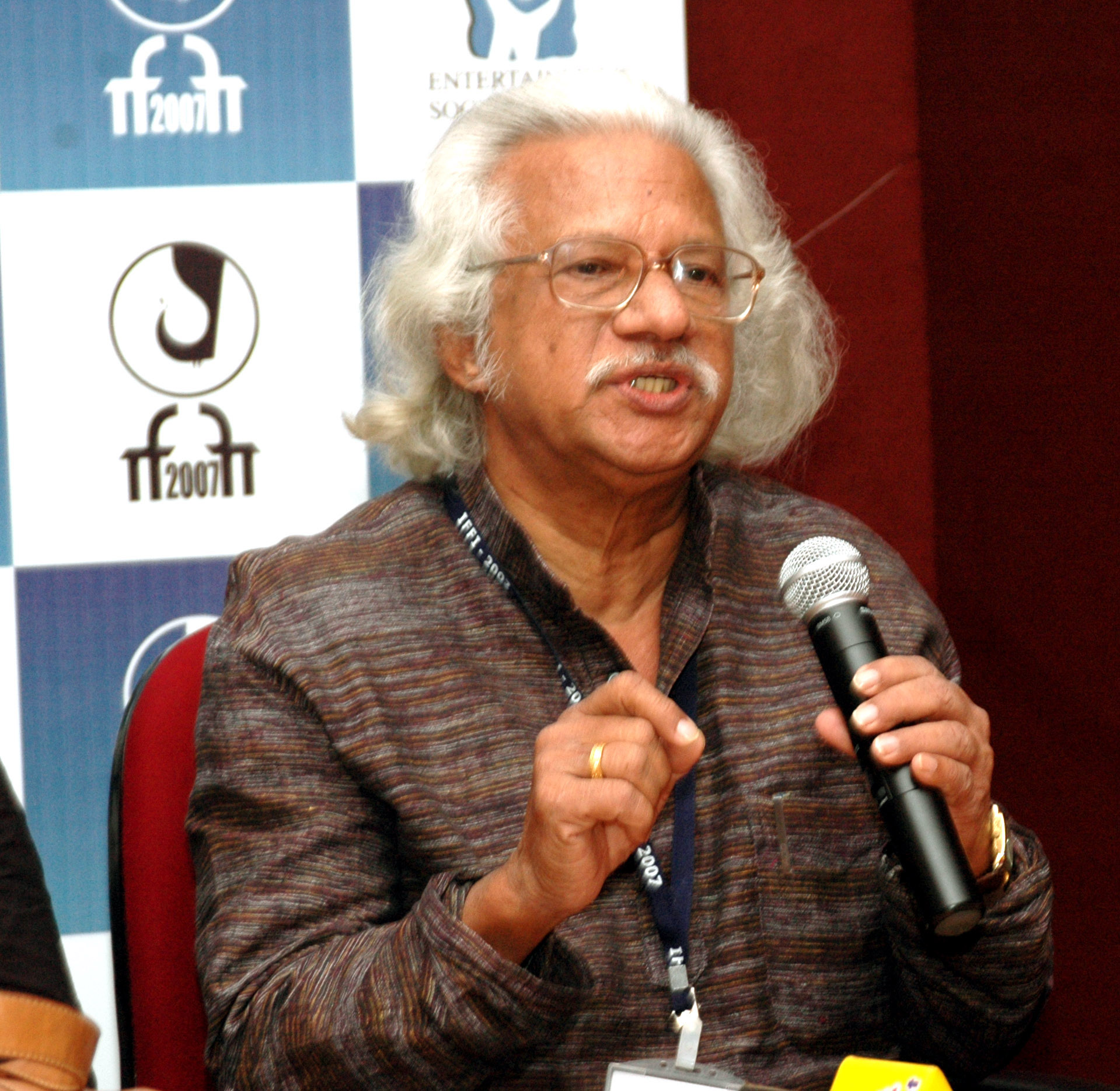
Adoor Gopalakrishnan

Malayalam cinema experienced its Golden Age during this time with works of filmmakers such as Adoor Gopalakrishnan, G. Aravindan, T. V. Chandran and Shaji N. Karun. Gopalakrishnan is often considered to be Ray's spiritual heir. He directed some of his most acclaimed films during this period, including Elippathayam (1981) which won the Sutherland Trophy at the London Film Festival. In 1984 My Dear Kuttichathan, directed by Jijo Punnoose under Navodaya Studio, was released and it was the first Indian film to be filmed in 3D format. Karun's debut film Piravi (1989) won the Caméra d'Or at Cannes, while his second film Swaham (1994) was in competition for the Palme d'Or. Vanaprastham was screened at the Un Certain Regard section of the Cannes Film Festival. Murali Nair's Marana Simhasanam (1999), inspired by the first execution by electrocution in India, the film was screened in the Un Certain Regard section at the 1999 Cannes Film Festival where it won the Caméra d'Or. The film received special reception at the British Film Institute.

Fazil's Manichitrathazhu (1993), scripted by Madhu Muttam, is inspired by a tragedy that happened in an Ezhava tharavad of Alummoottil meda' (an old traditional house) located at Muttom, Alappuzha district, with a central Travancore Channar family, in the 19th century. It was remade in four languages – in Kannada as Apthamitra, in Tamil as Chandramukhi, in Bengali as Rajmohol and in Hindi as Bhool Bhulaiyaa – all being commercially successful. Jeethu Joseph's Drishyam (2013) was remade into four other Indian languages: Drishya (2014) in Kannada, Drushyam (2014) in Telugu, Papanasam (2015) in Tamil and Drishyam (2015) in Hindi. Internationally, it was remade in Sinhala language as Dharmayuddhaya (2017) and in Chinese as Sheep Without a Shepherd (2019), and also in Indonesian.

==== Kannada ====
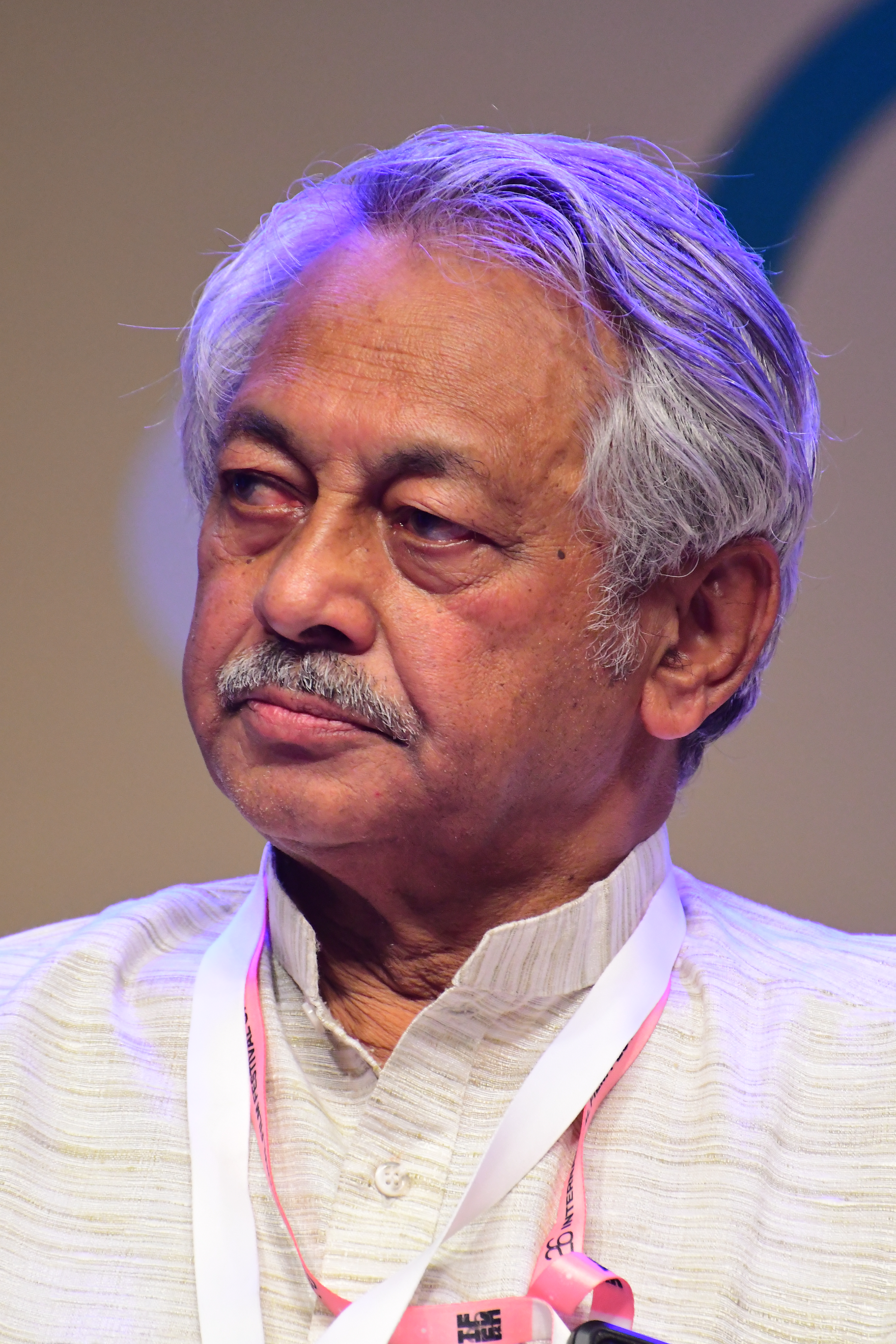
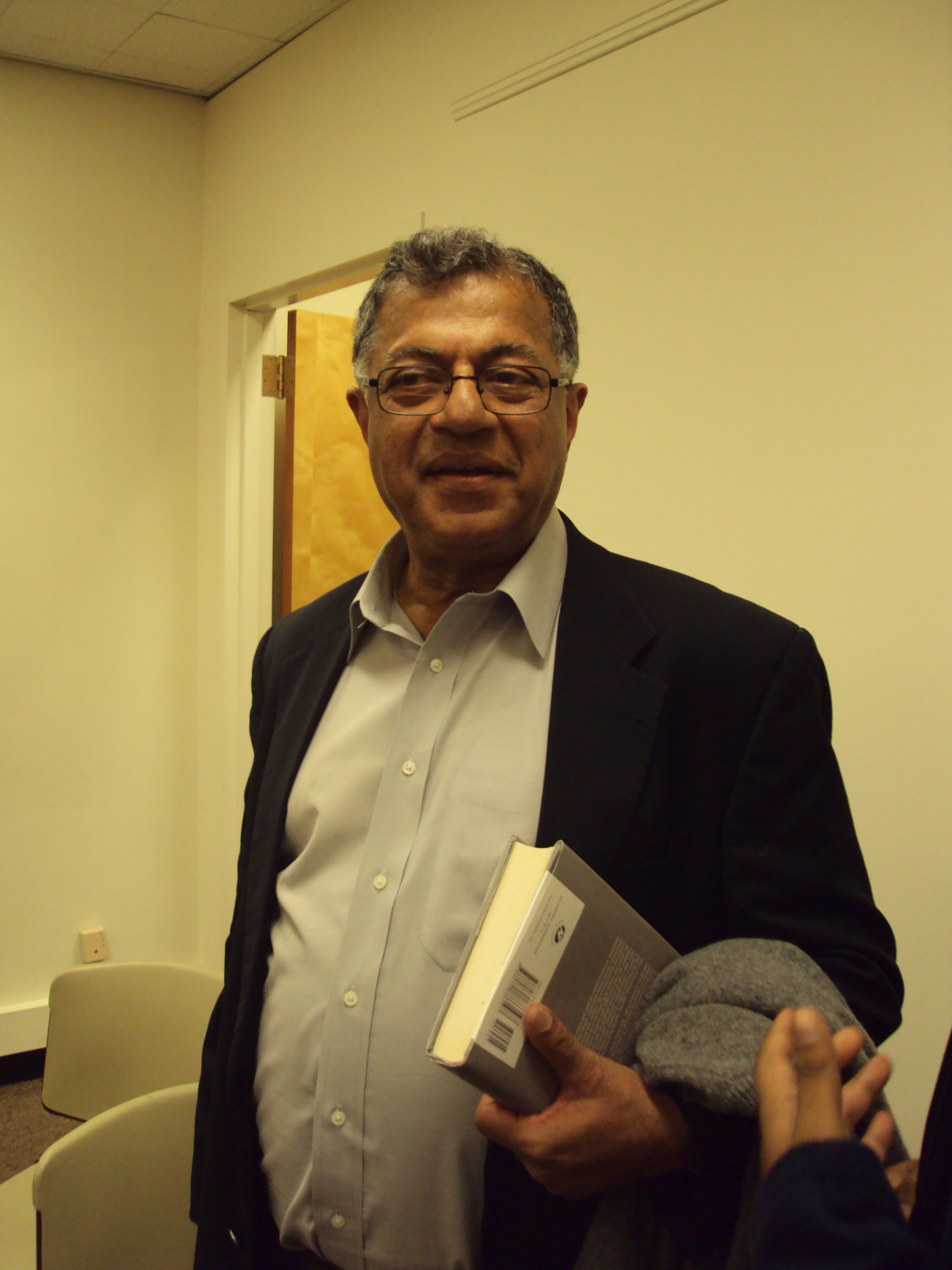
Girish Kasaravalli (left) and Girish Karnad (right)

Ethnographic works in Kannada Cinema took prominence such as B. V. Karanth's Chomana Dudi (1975), (based on Chomana Dudi by Shivaram Karanth), Girish Karnad's Kaadu (1973), (based on Kaadu by Srikrishna Alanahalli), Pattabhirama Reddy's Samskara (1970) (based on Samskara by U. R. Ananthamurthy), fetching the Bronze Leopard at Locarno International Film Festival, and T. S. Nagabharana's Mysuru Mallige (based on the works of poet K. S. Narasimhaswamy). Girish Kasaravalli's Ghatashraddha (1977), won the Ducats Award at the Manneham Film Festival Germany, Dweepa (2002), made to Best Film at Moscow International Film Festival,

Prashanth Neel's K.G.F (2018, 2022) is a period action series based on the Kolar Gold Fields. Set in the late 1970s and early 1980s the series follows Raja Krishnappa Bairya aka Rocky (Yash), a Mumbai-based high ranking mercenary born in poverty, to his rise to power in the Kolar Gold Fields and the subsequent uprising as one of the biggest gangster and businessman at that time. The film gathered cult following becoming the highest-grossing Kannada film. Rishab Shetty's Kantara (2022), received acclaim for showcasing the Bhoota Kola, a native Ceremonial dance performance prevalent among the Hindus of coastal Karnataka.

==== Marathi ====
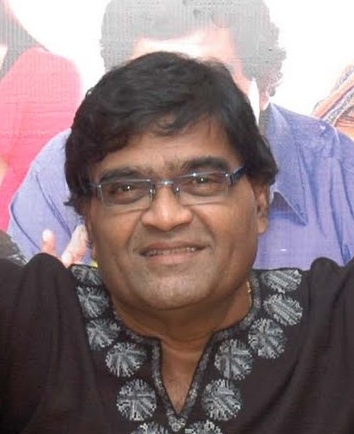
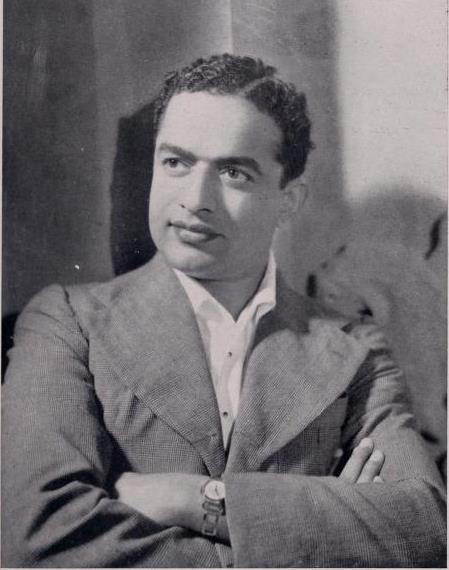
Ashok Saraf (left) and V. Shantaram (right)

Marathi cinema also known as Marathi film industry, is a film industry based in Mumbai, Maharashtra. It is the oldest film industry of India. The first Marathi movie, Raja Harishchandra of Dadasaheb Phalke was made in 1912, released in 1913 in Girgaon, it was a silent film with Marathi-English intertitles made with full Marathi actors and crew, after the film emerged successful, Phalke made many movies on Hindu mythology.

In 1932, the first sound film, Ayodhyecha Raja was released, just five years after 1st Hollywood sound film The Jazz Singer (1927). The first Marathi film in colour, Pinjara (1972), was made by V. Shantaram. In 1960s–70s movies was based on rural, social subjects with drama and humour genre, Nilu Phule was prominent villain that time. In the 1980s, M. Kothare and Sachin Pilgaonkar made many hit movies on thriller, and comedy genre respectively. Ashok Saraf and Laxmikant Berde starred in many of these and emerged as top actors. Anant Mane, Kamlaker Torne, Raja Paranjpe, Raj Dutta are considered as the best film Directors of the Marathi film's golden era. Mid-2000s onwards, the industry frequently made hit movies.

== Cultural context ==
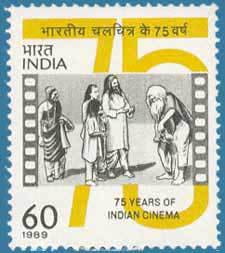
A commemorative postage stamp of 75 Years of Indian Cinema

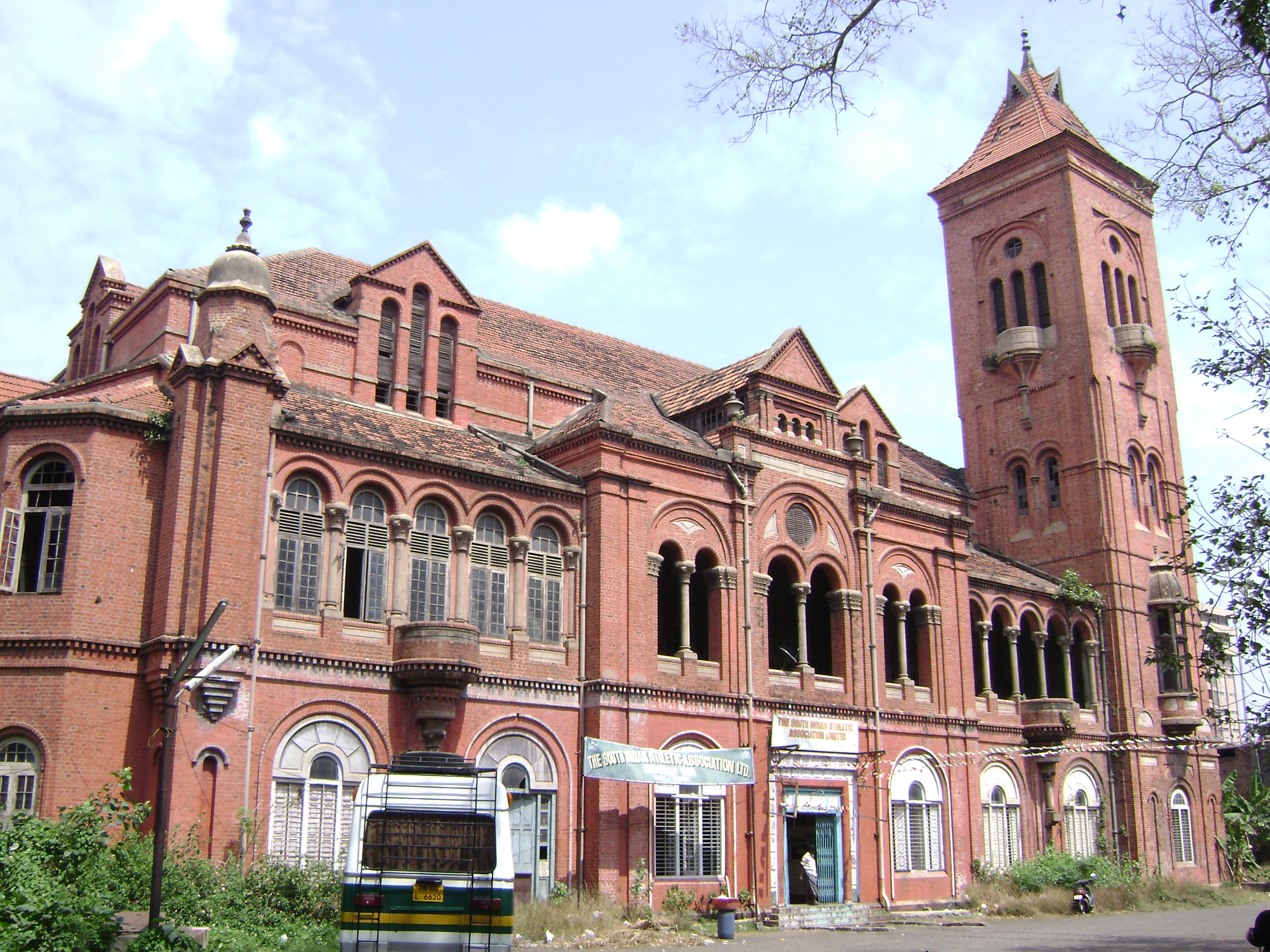
Victoria Public Hall, Chennai, served as a theatre in the late 19th century and the early 20th century.

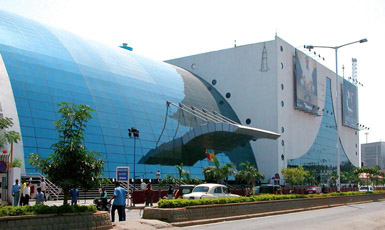
Prasads IMAX Theatre, Hyderabad, was once the world's largest 3D-IMAX screen and the most attended screen in the world.

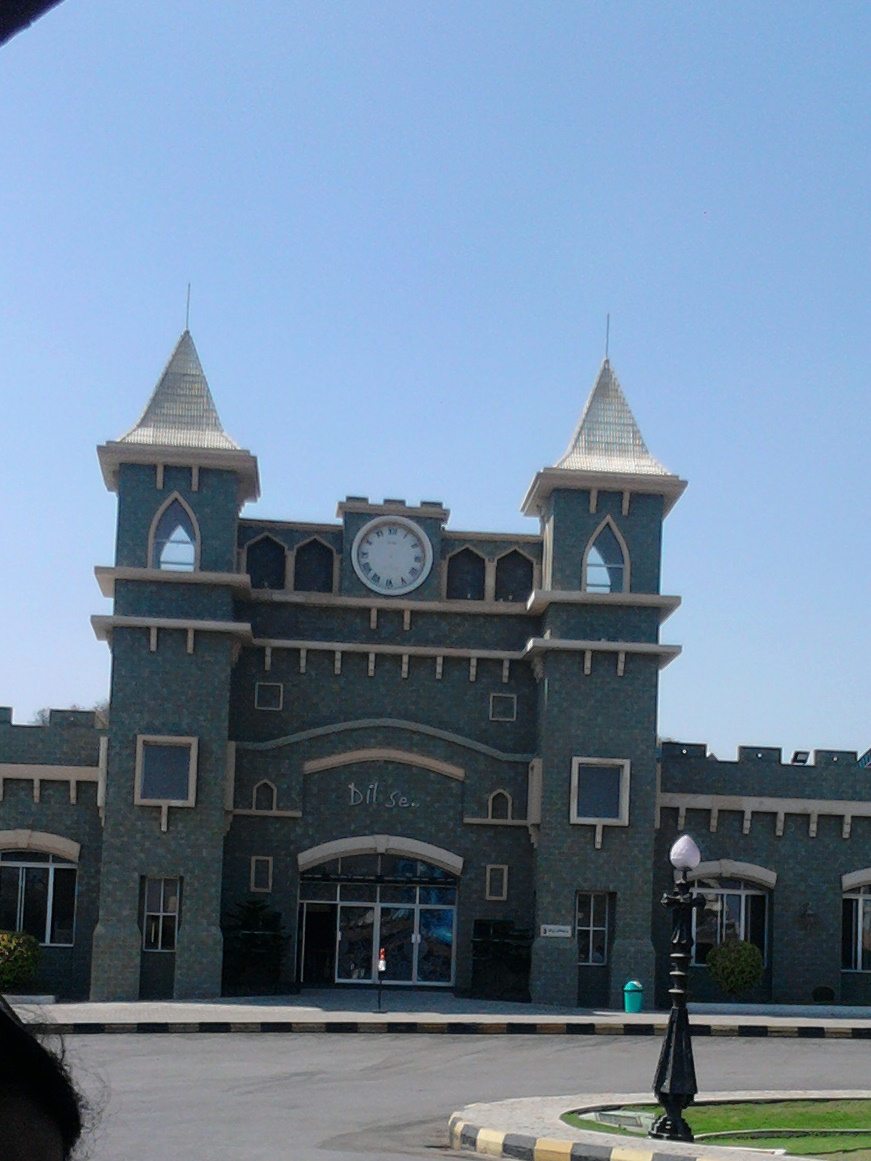
Ramoji Film City, Hyderabad, is the world's largest film studio.

K. Moti Gokulsing and Wimal Dissanayake identified six major influences that have shaped Indian popular cinema:

- The ancient epics of Mahabharata and Ramayana influenced the narratives of Indian cinema. Examples of this influence include the techniques of a side story, back-story and story within a story. Indian popular films often have plots that branch into sub-plots; such narrative dispersals can be seen in the 1993 films Khalnayak and Gardish.
- Ancient Sanskrit drama, with its emphasis on spectacle, music, dance and gesture combined "to create a vibrant artistic unit with dance and mime being central to the dramatic experience". Sanskrit dramas were known as natya, derived from the root word nrit (dance), featuring spectacular dance-dramas. The Rasa method of performance, dating to ancient times, is one of the fundamental features that differentiate Indian from Western cinema. In the Rasa method, the performer conveys emotions to the audience through empathy, in contrast to the Western Stanislavski method where the actor must become "a living, breathing embodiment of a character". The rasa method is apparent in the performances of Hindi actors such as Bachchan and Shah Rukh Khan and in Hindi films such as Rang De Basanti (2006), and Ray's works.
- Traditional folk theatre, which became popular around the 10th century with the decline of Sanskrit theatre. These regional traditions include the Yatra of West Bengal, the Ramlila of Uttar Pradesh, Yakshagana of Karnataka, 'Chindu Natakam' of Andhra Pradesh and the Terukkuttu of Tamil Nadu.
- Parsi theatre, which blends realism and fantasy, containing crude humour, songs and music, sensationalism, and dazzling stagecraft. These influences are clearly evident in masala films such as Coolie (1983), and to an extent in more recent critically acclaimed films such as Rang De Basanti.
- Hollywood-made popular musicals from the 1920s through the 1960s, though Indian films used musical sequences as another fantasy element in the song-and-dance tradition of narration, undisguised and "intersect[ing] with people's day-to-day lives in compelex and interesting ways."
- Western music videos, particularly MTV, had an increasing influence in the 1990s, as can be seen in the pace, camera angles, dance sequences, and music of recent Indian films. An early example of this approach was Bombay (1995, Mani Ratnam).

Sharmistha Gooptu and Bhaumik identify Indo-Persian/Islamicate culture as another major influence. In the early 20th century, Urdu was the lingua franca of popular performances across northern India, established in performance art traditions such as nautch dancing, Urdu poetry and Parsi theatre. Urdu and related Hindi dialects were the most widely understood across northern India, thus Hindustani became the standardised language of early Indian talkies. One Thousand and One Nights (Arabian Nights) had a strong influence on Parsi theatre, which adapted "Persianate adventure-romances" into films, and on early Bombay cinema where "Arabian Nights cinema" became a popular genre.

Like mainstream Indian popular cinema, Indian parallel cinema was influenced by a combination of Indian theatre and Indian literature (such as Bengali literature and Urdu poetry), but differs when it comes to foreign influences, where it is influenced more by European cinema (particularly Italian neorealism and French poetic realism) than by Hollywood. Ray cited Vittorio De Sica's Bicycle Thieves (1948) and Jean Renoir's The River (1951), on which he assisted, as influences on his debut film Pather Panchali (1955).

== International influence ==
During colonial rule, Indians bought film equipment from Europe. The British funded wartime propaganda films during the Second World War, some of which showed the Indian army pitted against the Axis powers, specifically the Empire of Japan, which had managed to infiltrate India. One such story was Burma Rani, which depicted civilian resistance to Japanese occupation by British and Indian forces in Myanmar. Pre-independence businessmen such as J. F. Madan and Abdulally Esoofally traded in global cinema.

Early Indian films made early inroads into the Soviet Union, Middle East, Southeast Asia and China. Mainstream Indian movie stars gained international fame across Asia and Eastern Europe. For example, Indian films were more popular in the Soviet Union than Hollywood films and occasionally domestic Soviet films. From 1954 to 1991, 206 Indian films were sent to the Soviet Union, drawing higher average audience figures than domestic Soviet productions, Films such as Awaara and Disco Dancer drew more than 60 million viewers. Films such as Awaara, 3 Idiots and Dangal, were among the 20 highest-grossing films in China.

Many Asian and South Asian countries increasingly found Indian cinema more suited to their sensibilities than Western cinema. Jigna Desai holds that by the 21st century, Indian cinema had become 'deterritorialised', spreading to parts of the world where Indian expatriates were present in significant numbers and had become an alternative to other international cinema.

Indian films frequently appeared in international fora and film festivals. This allowed parallel Bengali filmmakers to achieve worldwide fame.

Indian cinema more recently began influencing Western musical films, and played a particularly instrumental role in the revival of the genre in the Western world. Ray's work had a worldwide impact, with filmmakers such as Martin Scorsese, James Ivory, Abbas Kiarostami, François Truffaut, Carlos Saura, Isao Takahata and Gregory Nava citing his influence, and others such as Akira Kurosawa praising his work. The "youthful coming-of-age dramas that flooded art houses since the mid-fifties owe a tremendous debt to the Apu trilogy", according to the film critic Michael Sragow. Since the 1980s, overlooked Indian filmmakers such as Ghatak and Dutt posthumously gained international acclaim. Baz Luhrmann stated that his successful musical film Moulin Rouge! (2001) was directly inspired by Bollywood musicals. That film's success renewed interest in the then-moribund Western musical genre, subsequently fuelling a renaissance. Danny Boyle's Slumdog Millionaire (2008) was directly inspired by Indian films, and is considered to be an "homage to Hindi commercial cinema".

Indian cinema has been recognised repeatedly at the US-based Academy Awards. Indian films Mother India (1957), Salaam Bombay! (1988) and Lagaan (2001), were nominated for the Academy Award for Best Foreign Language Film. Indian Oscar winners include Bhanu Athaiya (costume designer), Ray (filmmaker), A. R. Rahman (music composer), Resul Pookutty (sound editor) and Gulzar (lyricist), M. M. Keeravani (music composer), Chandrabose (lyricist) Cottalango Leon and Rahul Thakkar Sci-Tech Award.

== Genres and styles ==
=== Masala film ===
Masala is a style of Indian cinema that mixes multiple genres in one work, pioneered in the early 1970s Bollywood by filmmaker Nasir Hussain, For example, one film can portray action, comedy, drama, romance and melodrama. These films tend to be musicals with songs filmed in picturesque locations. Plots for such movies may seem illogical and improbable to unfamiliar viewers. The genre is named after masala, a mixture of spices in Indian cuisine.

=== Parallel cinema ===
Parallel cinema, also known as art cinema or the Indian New Wave, is known for its realism and naturalism, addressing the sociopolitical climate. This movement is distinct from mainstream Bollywood cinema and began around the same time as the French and Japanese New Waves. The movement began in Bengal (led by Ray, Sen and Ghatak) and then gained prominence in other regions. The movement was launched by Bimal Roy's Do Bigha Zamin (1953), which was both a commercial and critical success, winning the International Prize at Cannes. Ray's films include the three instalments of The Apu Trilogy which won major prizes at the Cannes, Berlin and Venice Film Festivals, and are frequently listed among the greatest films of all time.

Other neo-realist filmmakers were Shyam Benegal, Karun, Gopalakrishnan and Kasaravalli.

=== Multilingual ===
Some Indian films are known as "multilinguals", filmed in similar but non-identical versions, in different languages. Chittoor Nagayya, was one of the first multilingual filmmakers in India. Alam Ara and Kalidas are earliest examples of bilingual filmmaking in India. According to Ashish Rajadhyaksha and Paul Willemen in the Encyclopedia of Indian Cinema (1994), in its most precise form, a multilingual is

a bilingual or a trilingual [that] was the kind of film made in the 1930s in the studio era, when different but identical takes were made of every shot in different languages, often with different leading stars but identical technical crew and music.

Rajadhyaksha and Willemen note that in seeking to construct their Encyclopedia, they often found it "extremely difficult to distinguish multilinguals in this original sense from dubbed versions, remakes, reissues or, in some cases, the same film listed with different titles, presented as separate versions in different languages ... it will take years of scholarly work to establish definitive data in this respect".

=== Pan-India film ===
Pan-India is a term related to Indian cinema that originated with Telugu cinema as a mainstream commercial cinema appealing to audiences across the country with a spread to world markets. S. S. Rajamouli pioneered the Pan-Indian films movement with his duology of epic action films Baahubali: The Beginning (2015) and Baahubali 2: The Conclusion (2017). "Pan-India film" is both a style of cinema and a distribution strategy, designed to universally appeal to audiences across the country and simultaneously released in multiple languages.

== Music ==
Music and songs play a significant role in Indian cinema. As well as entertaining the audience, they also drive the narrative forward. Music and dance are core elements of Indian culture, and films incorporate these to enrich the narrative. Songs are used to express emotions that spoken dialogue might struggle to convey. They are also often used to advance the plot. The lyrics may reveal a character's inner thoughts or motivations, or foreshadow future events. Sometimes, a song itself can become a turning point in the story. While some people may find them disruptive, songs remain a deeply rooted tradition in Indian cinema, reflecting both the culture and what audiences love.

Music is a substantial revenue generator for the Indian film industry, with music rights alone accounting for 4–5% of net revenues. The major film music companies are T-Series at Delhi, Sony Music India at Chennai and Zee Music Company at Mumbai, Aditya Music at Hyderabad and Saregama at Kolkata. Film music accounts for 48% of net music sales in the country. A typical film may feature 5–6 choreographed songs.

The demands of a multicultural, increasingly globalised Indian audience led to a mixing of local and international musical traditions. Local dance and music remain a recurring theme in India and followed the Indian diaspora. Playback singers such as Mohammad Rafi, Lata Mangeshkar, Kishore Kumar, Asha Bhosle, Mukesh, S. Janaki, P. Susheela, K. J. Yesudas, S. P. Balasubrahmanyam, K. S. Chithra, Anuradha Paudwal, Kavita Krishnamurthy, Alka Yagnik, Sadhana Sargam, Shreya Ghoshal , Sunidhi Chauhan, Kumar Sanu, Udit Narayan, Abhijeet and Sonu Nigam drew crowds to presentations of film music. In the 21st century interaction increased between Indian artists and others.

In 2023, the song "Naatu Naatu" composed by M. M. Keeravani for the movie RRR won the Oscar for Best Original Song at the 95th Academy Awards, making it the first song from an Indian film, as well as the first from an Asian film, to win in this category. This made it the first Indian film by an Indian production to win an Academy Award.

== Filming locations ==
A filming location is any place where acting and dialogue are recorded. Sites where filming without dialogue takes place are termed a second unit photography site. Filmmakers often choose to shoot on location because they believe that greater realism can be achieved in a "real" place. Location shooting is often motivated by budget considerations.

The most popular locations for filming in India are the main cities of their state for regional industry. Other locations include Manali and Shimla in Himachal Pradesh; Srinagar in Jammu and Kashmir; Ladakh; Darjeeling in West Bengal; Ooty and Kodaikanal in Tamil Nadu; Amritsar in Punjab; Udaipur, Jodhpur, Jaisalmer and Jaipur in Rajasthan; Delhi; Ottapalam in Kerala; Goa and Puducherry.

== Production companies ==
More than 1000 production organisations operate in the Indian film industry, but few are successful. AVM Productions is the oldest surviving studio in India. Other major production houses include Yash Raj Films, T-Series Films, Aamir Khan Productions, Red Chillies Entertainment, Dharma Productions, Eros International, Ajay Devgn FFilms, Balaji Motion Pictures, UTV Motion Pictures, Cape of Good Films, Maddock Films, K Sera Sera Virtual Productions, Vyjayanthi Movies, Lyca Productions, Madras Talkies, AGS Entertainment, Arka Media Works, Hombale Films, Mythri Movie Makers, Geetha Arts, Sun Pictures, Sri Venkateswara Creations, Raaj Kamal Films International, Aashirvad Cinemas, and Wunderbar Films.

== Cinema by language ==
Films are made in many cities and regions in India including Andhra Pradesh and Telangana, Assam, Bengal, Bihar, Gujarat, Haryana, Jammu, Kashmir, Jharkhand, Karnataka, Goa, Kerala, Maharashtra, Manipur, Odisha, Chhattisgarh, Punjab, Rajasthan, Tamil Nadu, Tripura and Mizoram.

Percent of share of each language by number of films produced in India in April 2021–February 2022.
1. Hindi (16.2%)
2. Telugu (15.2%)
3. Kannada (13.2%)
4. Tamil (13.1%)
5. Malayalam (12.3%)
6. Bhojpuri (7.69%)
7. Marathi (4.71%)
8. Bengali (3.84%)
9. Others (13.8%)

Breakdown by languages
April 2021–February 2022 Indian feature films certified by the Central Board of Film Certification by languages. Note: This table indicates the number of films certified by the CBFC's regional offices in nine cities. The actual number of films produced may be less.
Language	No. of films
Hindi	468
Telugu	438
Kannada	381
Tamil	377
Malayalam	355
Bhojpuri	222
Marathi	136
Bengali	111
Gujarati	82
Odia	74
Punjabi	53
Hindustani	33
Manipuri	27
Urdu	27
Assamese	24
English	13
Chhattisgarhi	12
Awadhi	8
Tulu	6
Banjara	5
Maithili	4
Rajasthani	4
Sanskrit	4
Konkani	3
Nagpuri	2
Nepali	2
Kodava	2
Haryanvi	2
Beary	1
Garhwali	1
Himachali	1
Kurumba	1
Hajong	1
Irula	1
Khasi	1
Magahi	1
Mising	1
Rabha	1
Silent	1
Total	2886

=== Assamese ===
Joymati, 1935

The Assamese-language film industry is based in Assam in northeastern India. It is sometimes called Jollywood, for the Jyoti Chitraban Film Studio. Some films have been well received by critics but they have not yet captured national audiences. The 21st century has produced Hollywood and Bollywood-style Assamese movies which have set new box office records for the small industry.

=== Bengali ===
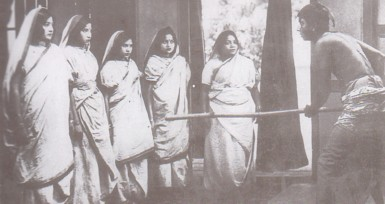
A scene from Dena Paona (1931), the first Bengali talkie

The Bengali-language cinematic tradition of Tollygunge, West Bengal, is also known as Tollywood. When the term was coined in the 1930s, it was the centre of the Indian film industry. West Bengal cinema is historically known for the parallel cinema movement and art films.

=== Braj Bhasha ===
Braj-language films present Brij culture mainly to rural people, predominantly in the nebulous Braj region centred around Mathura, Agra, Aligarh and Hathras in Western Uttar Pradesh and Bharatpur and Dholpur in Rajasthan (northern India). It is the predominant language in the central stretch of the Ganges-Yamuna Doab in Uttar Pradesh. The first Brij Bhasha movie was Brij Bhoomi (1982, Shiv Kumar), which was a success throughout the country. Later Brij Bhasha cinema saw the production of films like Jamuna Kinare and Brij Kau Birju.

=== Bhojpuri ===
Bhojpuri-language films predominantly cater to residents of western Bihar and eastern Uttar Pradesh and also have a large audience in Delhi and Mumbai due to the migration of Bhojpuri speakers to these cities. International markets for these films developed in other Bhojpuri-speaking countries of the West Indies, Oceania and South America.

Bhojpuri film history begins with Ganga Maiyya Tohe Piyari Chadhaibo (Mother Ganges, I will offer you a yellow sari, 1962, Kundan Kumar). Throughout the following decades, few films were produced. The industry experienced a revival beginning with the hit Saiyyan Hamar (My Sweetheart, 2001, Mohan Prasad). Although smaller than other Indian film industries, these successes increased Bhojpuri cinema's visibility, leading to an awards show and a trade magazine, Bhojpuri City.

=== Chakma ===
The Chakma language is spoken in Tripura and Mizoram (Northeast India), as well as in the Chittagong Hill Tracts region of Bangladesh. Films in Chakma include Tanyabi Firti (Tanyabi's Lake, 2005, Satarupa Sanyal).

=== Chhattisgarhi ===
The Chhattisgarhi-language film industry of Chhattisgarhi state, central India, is known as Chhollywood. Its beginnings are with Kahi Debe Sandesh (In Black and White, 1965, Manu Nayak) No Chhattisgarhi films were released from 1971 until Mor Chhainha Bhuinya (2000).

=== English ===
Indian filmmakers also produce English language films. Deepa Mehta, Anant Balani, Homi Adajania, Vijay Singh, Vierendrra Lalit and Sooni Taraporevala have garnered recognition in Indian English cinema.

=== Gujarati ===
The Gujarati-language film industry, also known as Gollywood or Dhollywood, is currently centred in the state of Gujarat. During the silent era, many filmmakers and actors were Gujarati and Parsi, and their films were closely related to Gujarati culture. Twenty film companies and studios, mostly located in Bombay, were owned by Gujaratis and at least 44 major Gujarati directors worked during this era. The first film released in Gujarati was Narsinh Mehta (1932). More than one thousand Gujarati films have been released.

Gujarati cinema ranges from mythology to history and from social to political. Gujarati films originally targeted a rural audience, but after its revival (c. 2005) catered to an urban audience.

=== Hindi ===
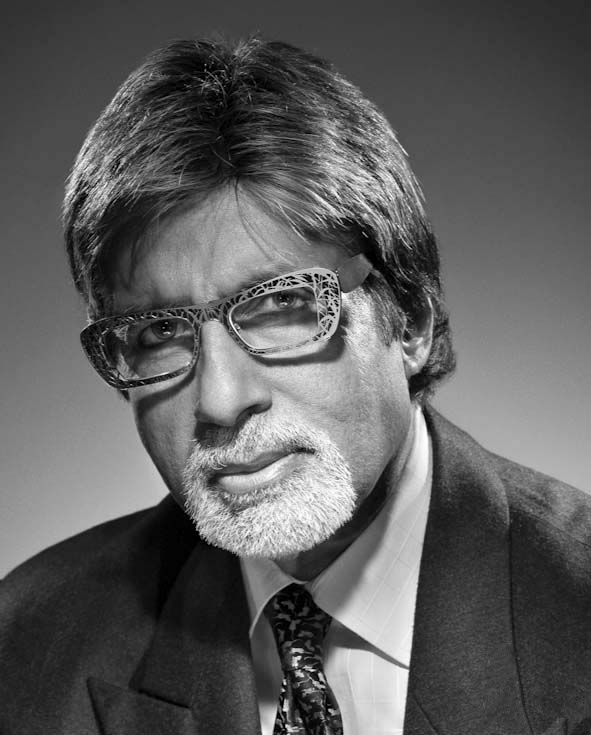
Amitabh Bachchan has been a popular Bollywood actor for over 45 years.

The Hindi language film industry of Mumbai (formerly Bombay), also known as Bollywood, is the largest and most powerful branch of Hindi cinema. Hindi cinema explores issues of caste and culture in films such as Achhut Kanya (1936) and Sujata (1959). International visibility came to the industry with Raj Kapoor's Awara and later in Shakti Samantha's Aradhana. Art film directors include Kaul, Kumar Shahani, Ketan Mehta, Govind Nihalani, Shyam Benegal, Mira Nair, Nagesh Kukunoor, Sudhir Mishra and Nandita Das. Hindi cinema grew during the 1990s with the release of as many as 215 films annually. Magazines such as Filmfare, Stardust and Cine Blitz popularly cover the industry.

=== Kannada ===
Kannada cinema, also known as Sandalwood or Chandanavana, is the segment of Indian cinema dedicated to the production of motion pictures in the Kannada language, which is widely spoken in Karnataka state. Sati Sulochana (1934, Y. V. Rao) was the first talkie film in the Kannada language. Kannada films include adaptations of major literary works and experimental films.

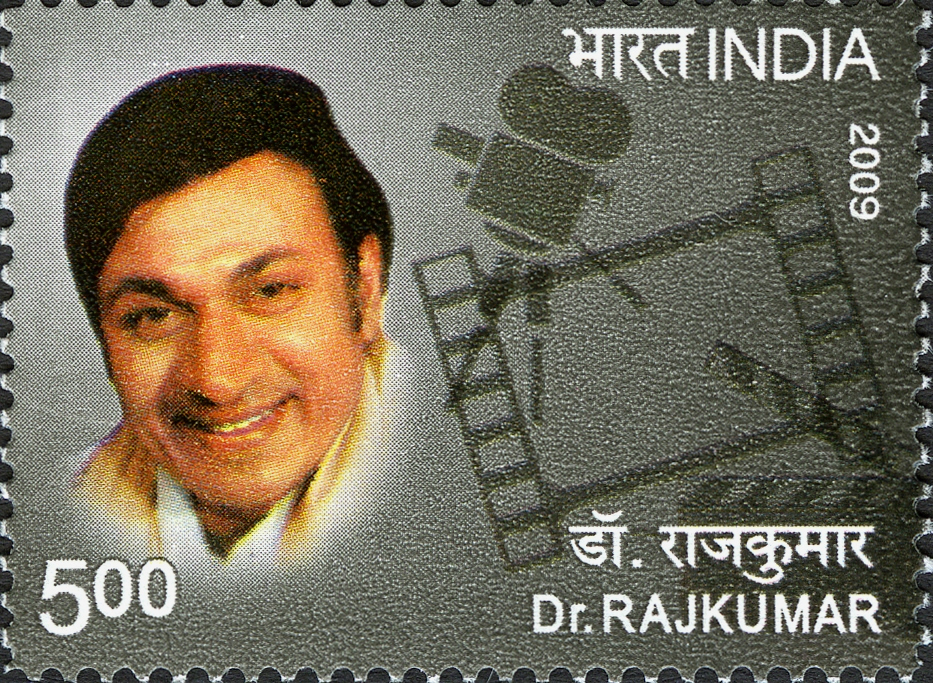
Rajkumar on a 2009 postage stamp

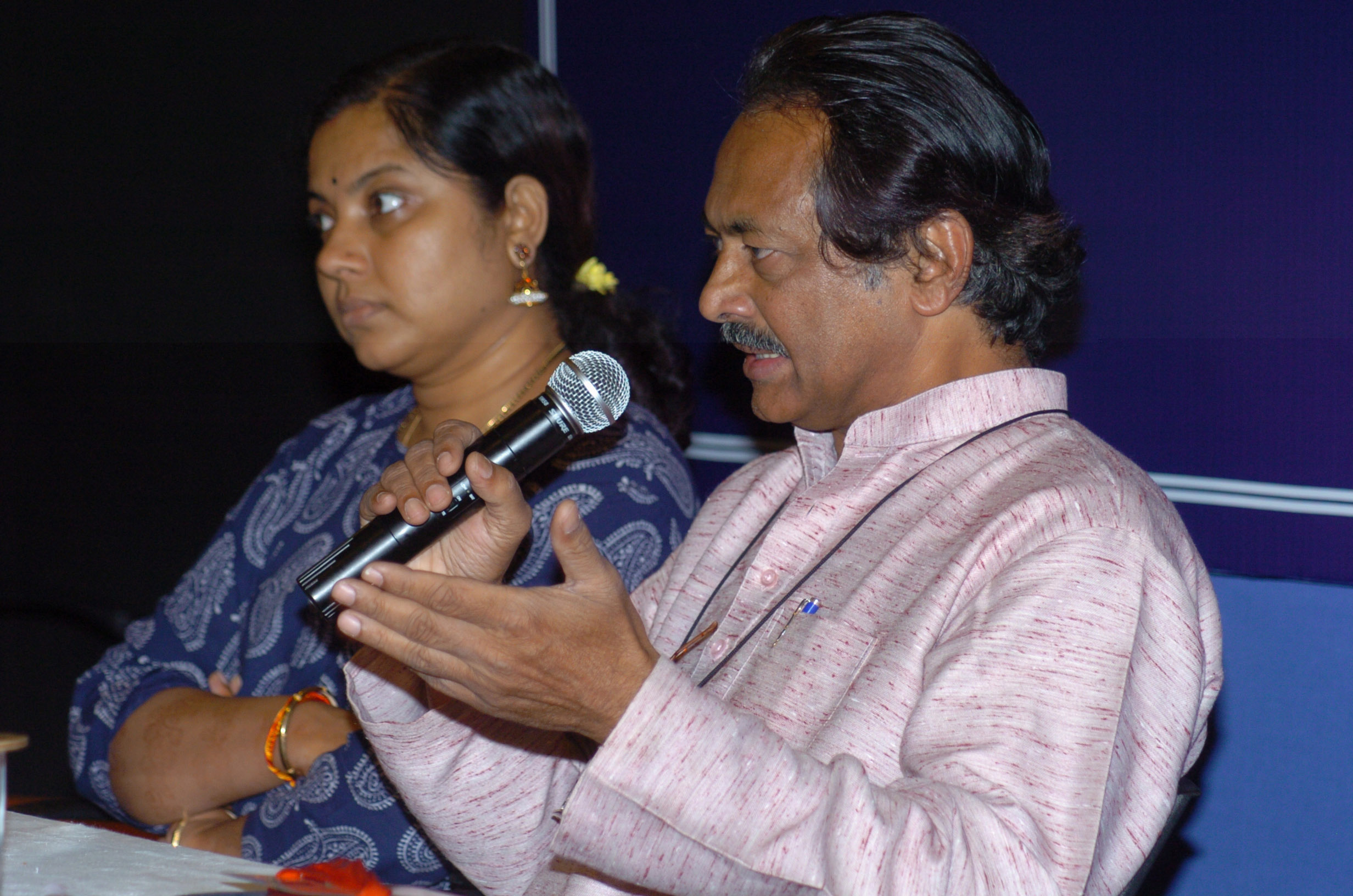
Director Girish Kasaravalli (right)

=== Kokborok ===
Kokborok-language films are mainly produced in Tripura and parts of Bangladesh. These films are also clubbed as 'Tripuri cinema' as a blanket term that alludes to the film industry of Tripura, encompassing films made by and for the people of Tripura and Kokborok speaking people in Bangladesh, regardless of the multitude of languages in which cinema is produced in the region'.

=== Konkani ===
Konkani-language films are mainly produced in Goa, one of India's smallest film regions which produced four films in 2009. The first full-length Konkani film was Mogacho Anvddo (1950, Jerry Braganza). The film's release date, 24 April, is celebrated as Konkani Film Day. An immense body of Konkani literature and art is a resource for filmmakers. Kazar (Marriage, 2009, Richard Castelino) and Ujvaadu (Shedding New Light on Old Age Issues, Kasaragod Chinna) are major releases. The pioneering Mangalorean Konkani film is Mog Ani Maipas.

=== Maithili ===
Maithili cinema is made in the Maithili language. The first full-length film was Kanyadan (1965). There are numerous films made in the Maithili over the years The film Mithila Makhaan (2019) won a National Award in the regional films category.

=== Malayalam ===
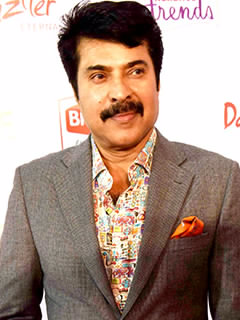
Mammooty has won the most number of National Awards in the Best Actor category in the Malayalam industry.

The Malayalam-language film industry, also known as Mollywood, is India's fourth-largest film industry. It is mainly based at Kochi, Kerala state. Neelakkuyil (1954) was one of the first Malayalam films to get national recognition. Newspaper Boy (1955), made by a group of students, was the first neo-realistic Malayalam film. Chemmeen (1965, Ramu Kariat), based on a story by Thakazhi Sivasankara Pillai, became the first South Indian film to win the National Film Award for Best Feature Film.

Malayalam cinema has been in the forefront of technological innovation in Indian filmmaking. The first neorealistic film (Newspaper Boy), the first CinemaScope film (Thacholi Ambu), the first 70 mm film (Padayottam), the first 3D film (My Dear Kuttichathan), the first Panavision film (Vanaprastham), the first digital film (Moonnamathoral), the first Smartphone film (Jalachhayam), and the first 8K film (Villain) in India were made in Malayalam.

The period from 1986 to 1990 is regarded as the Golden Age of Malayalam cinema, with four Malayalam films recognised by selection at the Cannes Film Festival—Shaji N. Karun-directed Piravi (1989), Swaham (1994) and Vanaprastham (1999), and Murali Nair-directed Marana Simhasanam (1999). Piravi (1989) won the Caméra d'Or — Mention Spéciale and Marana Simhasanam has won the Caméra d'Or.

The Kerala State Film Awards established by the Government of Kerala recognises the best works in Malayalam cinema every year, along with J. C. Daniel Award for lifetime achievement in Malayalam cinema. K. R. Narayanan National Institute of Visual Science and Arts (KRNNIVSA) is a training and research centre for film and video technology.

=== Manipuri ===
Manipuri cinema is a small film industry of Manipur, encompassing Meitei language and other languages of the state. It began in the 1970s and gained momentum following a 2002 state ban on Hindi films. 80–100 movies are made each year. Among the notable Manipuri films are Imagi Ningthem (1982, Aribam Syam Sharma), Ishanou, Yenning Amadi Likla, Phijigee Mani, Leipaklei, Loktak Lairembee, Eikhoishibu Kanano, Eikhoigi Yum and Oneness.

=== Marathi ===
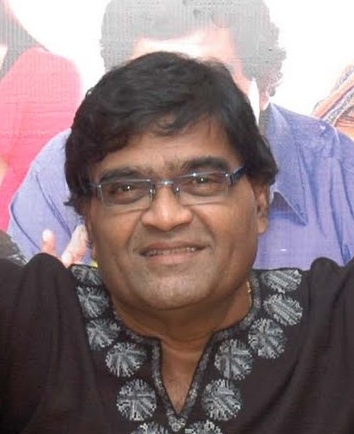
Ashok Saraf has been a popular Marathi actor for over 40 years.

Marathi cinema, also known as the Marathi film industry, is an Indian film industry primarily based in the state of Maharashtra, particularly in Mumbai and Pune. It is one of the oldest regional film industries in India and has made significant contributions to Indian cinema. Raja Harishchandra (1913), directed by Dadasaheb Phalke, is widely regarded as India's first full-length feature film, while Ayodhyecha Raja (1932), directed by V. Shantaram, was the first Marathi talkie. Sant Tukaram (1936), directed by Vishnupant Damle and Sheikh Fattelal, became the first Indian film to receive an award at the Venice International Film Festival. Shyamchi Aai (1953), directed by Pralhad Keshav Atre, was the first recipient of the President's Gold Medal for the All-India Best Feature Film at the National Film Awards.

Marathi cinema has produced several influential filmmakers, actors and films, including V. Shantaram, Bhalji Pendharkar, Raja Paranjape, Jabbar Patel, Sachin Pilgaonkar, Mahesh Kothare, Mahesh Manjrekar and Nagraj Manjule. The industry has also been noted for its social realism, literary adaptations, folk traditions and experimental filmmaking. Shwaas (2004), directed by Sandeep Sawant, won the National Film Award for Best Feature Film and was India's official submission for the Academy Award for Best Foreign Language Film.

The Maharashtra State Film Awards, established by the Government of Maharashtra, recognise excellence in Marathi cinema in various categories. The state also presents the V. Shantaram Lifetime Achievement Award for outstanding contributions to Marathi cinema.

=== Nagpuri ===
Nagpuri films are produced in the Nagpuri language in Jharkhand state. The first Nagpuri feature film was Sona Kar Nagpur (1992). With a mainly rural population and cinema halls closing, non-traditional distribution models may be used.

=== Gorkha ===
Gorkha cinema consists of films produced by Nepali-speaking Indians.

=== Odia ===
The Odia-language film industry of Bhubaneswar and Cuttack, Odisha state, is also known as Ollywood. The first Odia-language film was Sita Bibaha (1936). The best year for Odia cinema was 1984 when Maya Miriga (Nirad Mohapatra) and Dhare Alua were showcased in Indian Panorama and Maya Miriga was invited to Critics Week at Cannes. The film received the Best Third World Film award at Mannheim Film Festival, Jury Award in Hawaii and was shown at the London Film Festival.

=== Punjabi ===
The Punjabi-language film industry, based in Amritsar and Mohali, Punjab, is also known as Pollywood. K. D. Mehra made the first Punjabi film, Sheela (1935). As of 2009, Punjabi cinema had produced between 900 and 1,000 movies.

=== Rajasthani ===
The cinema of Rajasthan (Rajjywood) refers to films produced in Rajasthan in north-western India. These films are produced in various regional and tribal languages including Rajasthani varieties such as Mewari, Marwari, Hadoti etc.

=== Sindhi ===
The Sindhi-language film industry is largely based in Sindh, Pakistan, and with Sindhi speakers in North Gujarat and Southwestern Rajasthan, India, and elsewhere among the Sindhi diaspora. The first Indian-made Sindhi film was Ekta (1940). while the first Sindhi film produced in Pakistan was Umar Marvi (1956). The industry has produced some Bollywood-style films.

The Sindhi film industry produces movies at intervals. The first was Abana (1958), which was a success throughout the country. Sindhi cinema then produced some Bollywood-style films such as Hal Ta Bhaji Haloon, Parewari, Dil Dije Dil Waran Khe, Ho Jamalo, Pyar Kare Dis: Feel the Power of Love and The Awakening. Numerous Sindhi have contributed in Bollywood, including G P Sippy, Ramesh Sippy, Nikkhil Advani, Tarun Mansukhani, Ritesh Sidhwani and Asrani.

=== Sherdukpen ===
Director Songe Dorjee Thongdok introduced the first Sherdukpen-language film Crossing Bridges (2014). Sherdukpen is native to the north-eastern state of Arunachal Pradesh.

=== Tamil ===
The Tamil-language film industry based in Chennai, also known as Kollywood, once served as a hub for all South Indian film industries. The first South Indian talkie film Kalidas (1931, H. M. Reddy) was shot in Tamil. Sivaji Ganesan became India's first actor to receive an international award when he won Best Actor at the Afro-Asian film festival in 1960 and the title of Chevalier in the Legion of Honour by the French Government in 1995.

Tamil cinema is influenced by Dravidian politics and has a tradition of addressing social issues. Many of Tamil Nadu's prominent Chief Ministers previously worked in cinema: Dravidian stalwarts C N Annadurai and M Karunanidhi were scriptwriters and M G Ramachandran, Jayalalithaa and C. Joseph Vijay gained a political base through their fan followings.

Tamil films are distributed to Tamil diaspora populations in various parts of Asia, Southern Africa, Northern America, Europe, and Oceania. The industry-inspired Tamil film-making in Sri Lanka, Malaysia, Singapore and Canada.

=== Telugu ===
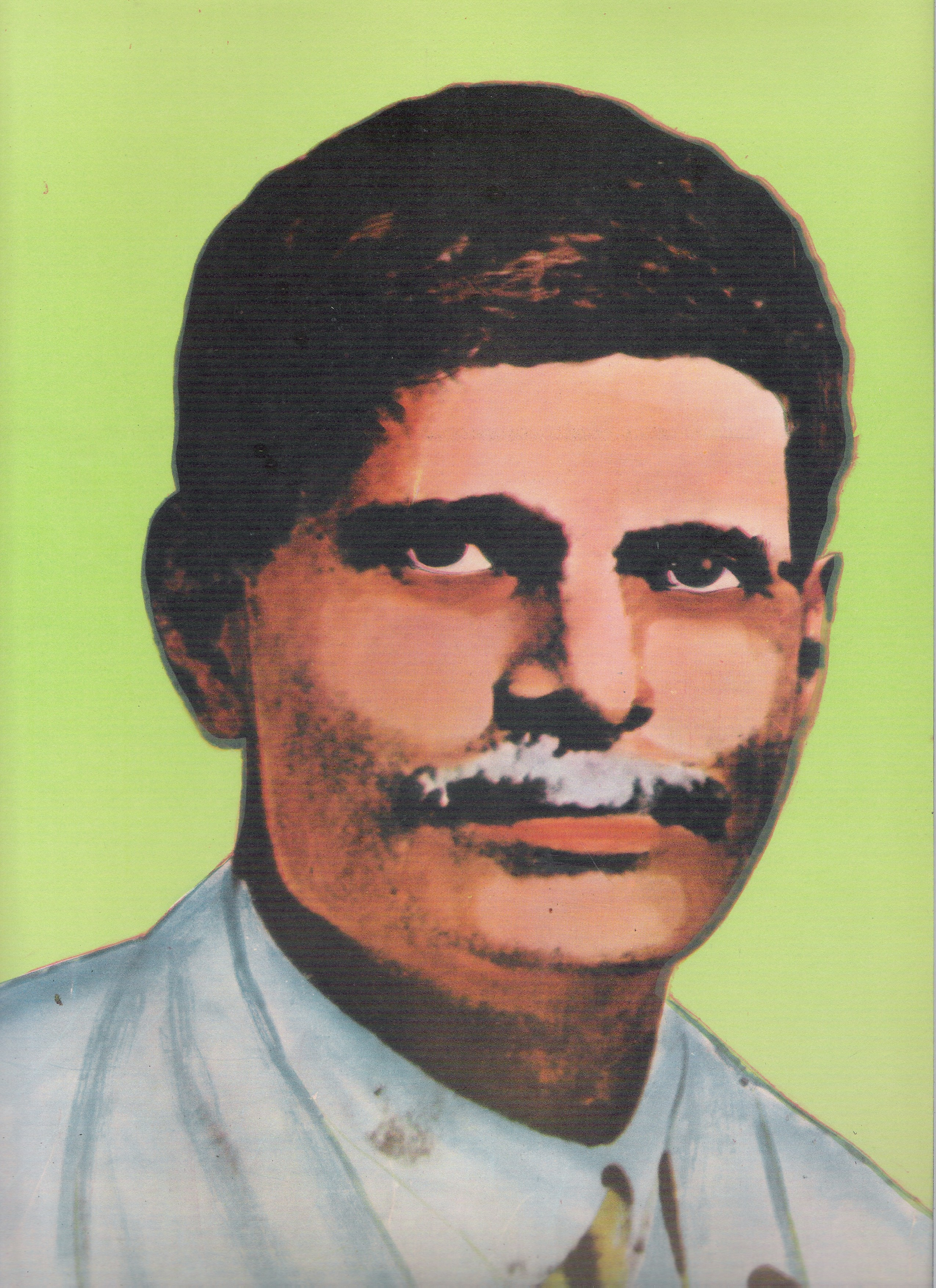
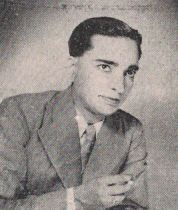
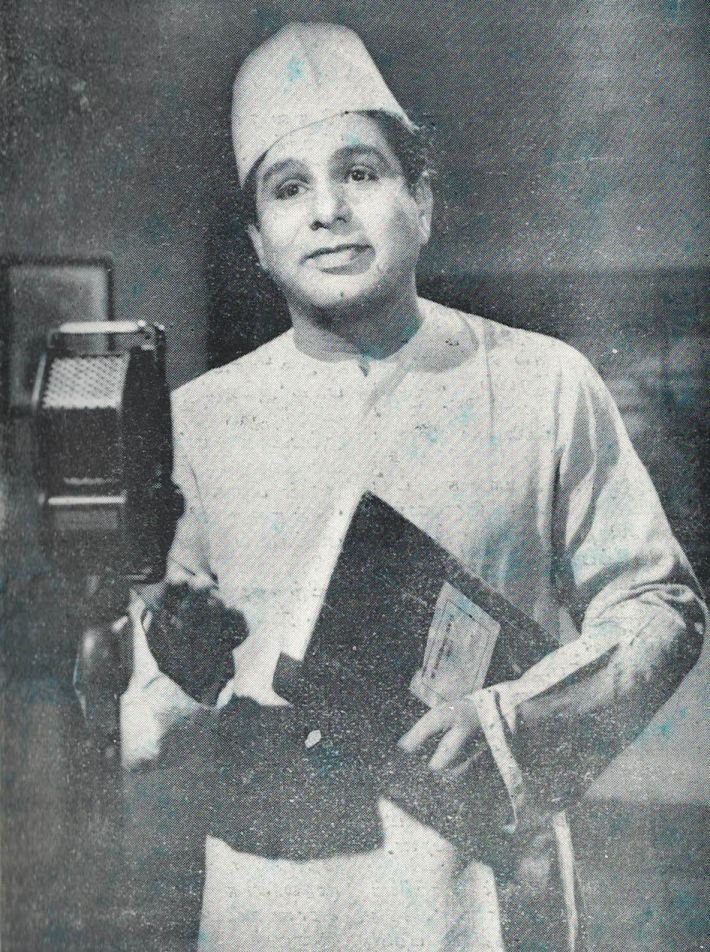
From left to right: Raghupati Venkayya (father of Telugu cinema), Y. V. Rao (pioneer of cinema during crown rule) and stalwart Chittoor Nagayya known for his method acting.

The Film and Television Institute of Telangana, Film and Television Institute of Andhra Pradesh, Ramanaidu Film School and Annapurna International School of Film and Media are among the largest film schools in India. The Telugu states are home to approximately 2800 theatres, more than any single state in India. Being commercially consistent, Telugu cinema had its influence over commercial cinema in India.

The industry holds the Guinness World Record for the largest film production facility in the world, Ramoji Film City. As per the CBFC report of 2014, the industry is placed first in India, in terms of films produced yearly. In the years 2005, 2006, 2008, and 2014 the industry has produced the largest number of films in India, exceeding the number of films produced in Bollywood.

=== Tulu ===
The Tulu-language film industry based in the port city of Mangalore, Karnataka, is also known as Coastalwood. A small industry, its origins trace to the release of Enna Thangadi (1971) with about one release per year until growth was spurred by the commercial success of Oriyardori Asal (2011). Films are released across the Tulu Nadu cultural region, with some recent films having a simultaneous release in Mumbai, Bangalore, and Arabian Gulf countries.

== Exhibition and distribution ==
PVR INOX, Cinepolis India etc. are some of the top multiplexes chains in India, which have cinemas across the nation. Book My Show and District are the leading online booking platforms in India. They have tie-ups with multiplexes and other cinemas. However, PVR INOX and Cinepolis India also sell tickets through their applications and websites. Due to the convenience in booking tickets, online most of the viewers pre-book tickets through mobile application. Since the advancement of internet service in India, online ticket selling business have had robust growth in the country. Since 2010, OTT platforms have gained popularity in India, thus some film-makers prefer to release their films online through OTT platforms like Netflix, WFCN, Amazon Prime, JioHotstar, SonyLIV, ZEE5, etc. and avoid a theatrical release.

== Awards ==
The Dadasaheb Phalke Award, named after the "father of Indian cinema" Dadasaheb Phalke, is given in recognition of lifetime contribution to cinema. It was established by the government of India in 1969, and is the country's most prestigious film award.

Prominent government-sponsored film awards
Award	Year of inception	Awarded by
Bengal Film Journalists' Association Awards	1937	Government of West Bengal
National Film Awards	1954	Government of India
Maharashtra State Film Awards	1962	Government of Maharashtra
Nandi Awards	1964	Government of Andhra Pradesh
Tamil Nadu State Film Awards	1967	Government of Tamil Nadu
Karnataka State Film Awards	1967	Government of Karnataka
Odisha State Film Awards	1968	Government of Odisha
Kerala State Film Awards	1969	Government of Kerala
Telangana Gaddar Film Awards	2025	Government of Telangana

Prominent non-governmental awards
Award	Year of inception	Awarded by
Bhojpuri Film Awards	2001	AB5 Multimedia
Sabrang Film Awards	2014	Godrej Consumer Products
International Bhojpuri Film Awards	2015	Yashi Films International
Filmfare Awards	1954	Bennett, Coleman and Co. Ltd.
Filmfare Awards South	1954	Bennett, Coleman and Co. Ltd.
South Indian International Movie Awards	2012	Vibri Media Group
IIFA Awards	2000	Wizcraft International Entertainment Pvt Ltd
Filmfare Awards Marathi	2014	Bennett, Coleman and Co. Ltd.
IIFA Utsavam	2016	Wizcraft International Entertainment Pvt Ltd
Zee Cine Awards Telugu	2017	Zee Entertainment Enterprises
Zee Cine Awards	1998	Zee Entertainment Enterprises
Sansui Viewer's Choice Movie Awards	1998	Pritish Nandy Communications
Santosham Film Awards	2004	Santosham film magazine
CineMAA Awards	2004	Tollywood Movie Artistes Association
Asianet Film Awards	1998	Asianet
Screen Awards	1994	Screen Weekly
Stardust Awards	2003	Stardust
Zee Gaurav Puraskar	2003	Zee Entertainment Enterprises
TSR TV9 National Awards Telugu	2007–2008	Associated Broadcasting Company Private Limited T. Subbarami Reddy
Apsara Awards	2004	Apsara Producers Guild Awards
Vijay Awards	2007	STAR Vijay
Marathi International Film and Theatre Awards	2010	Marathi Film Industry
Punjabi International Film Academy Awards	2012	Parvasi Media Inc.
Prag Cine Awards	2013	Prag AM Television
Filmfare Awards East	2014	Bennett, Coleman and Co. Ltd.
Maharashtracha Favourite Kon?	2009	Zee Talkies
Fakt Marathi Cine Sanman	2022	Fakt Marathi

== Film education ==
Government-run and private institutes provide formal education in various aspects of filmmaking. Some of the prominent ones include:

- State Institute of Film and Television
- AJK Mass Communication Research Centre, Jamia Millia Islamia, New Delhi
- Cultural Education Centre, University Film Club, Aligarh Muslim University, Aligarh
- Annapurna International School of Film and Media, Hyderabad
- Asian Academy of Film and Television
- Biju Pattnaik Film and Television Institute of Odisha
- BOFTA – Blue Ocean Film and Television Academy, Kodambakkam, Chennai, Tamil Nadu
- Centre for advanced media studies, Patiala
- Dr. Bhupen Hazarika Regional Government Film and Television Institute, Guwahati
- Mass Communication and the New Media Central University of Jammu
- Department of Culture and Media studies, Central University of Rajasthan
- Film and Television Institute of India (FTII), Pune
- Makhanlal Chaturvedi National University of Journalism and Communication (MCNUJC), Bhopal
- Film-Theater Studies, SOH, Tamil Nadu Open University, Saidapet, Chennai
- Government Film and Television Institute, Bangalore
- K. R. Narayanan National Institute of Visual Science and Arts (KRNNIVSA), Kottayam, Kerala
- L. V. Prasad Film and TV Academy, Chennai
- M.G.R. Government Film and Television Training Institute, Chennai
- Matrikas Film School
- National Institute of Design, Ahmedabad
- Palme Deor Media College, Tambaram west, Chennai and Arulananda Nagar, Thanjavur
- Satyajit Ray Film and Television Institute, Calcutta
- School of Media and Cultural Studies, Tata Institute of Social Sciences, Mumbai
- Srishti School of Art, Design, and Technology, Bangalore, Karnataka
- Whistling Woods International
- National School of Drama, Delhi
- School art and aesthetic, JNU Delhi

== See also ==
- List of Indian movies by language
- List of Indian winners and nominees of the Academy Awards
- List of Indian winners and nominees of the Golden Globe Awards
- List of Indian winners and nominees at the Cannes Film Festival
- International Film Festival of India
- List of Indian animated movies
- Lists of Indian actors
- List of Indian film actresses
