= Rangula Kala =

- Poster
- Directed by: B. Narsing Rao
- Written by: B. Narsing Rao
- Screenplay by: B. Narsing Rao
- Produced by: B. Venkateswara Rao
- Starring: B. Narsing Rao; Sai Chand; Roopa; Gaddar
- Cinematography: Venugopal K Thakker
- Music by: Gaddar
- Release date: 1983
- Running time: 2hrs 16 min
- Country: India
- Language: Telugu

Rangula Kala (English: A Colourful Dream) is a 1983 Indian Telugu-language drama film written and directed by B. Narsing Rao. The film won the Best Feature Film in Telugu, at the 31st National Film Awards "For a vivid portrayal of urban life as seen by a sensitive painter in search of his identification with the masses". It was screened in "Indian Panorama" of the 9th International Film Festival of India.

== Plot ==
The film chronicles the life of a skilled painter who fails to gain recognition, subsequently gets idealistically inspired to oppose the art of the elite.

== Cast ==
- B. Narsing Rao
- Sai Chand
- Roopa
- Gaddar

== Soundtrack ==
- Jam Jammalmarri - Writer:Devi Priya, Singer: Gaddar
- Bhadram Koduko - Writer: Guda Anjaiah, Singer: Gaddar
- Madhana Sundari - Writer: Guda Anjaiah, Singer: Gaddar
- Podala Podala - Writer: Guda Anjaiah, Singer: K.B.K.Mohan Raju,

== Awards ==
- Nandi Award for Best Supporting Actress – K. Sankutala
