= Harivillu =

- Directed by: B. Narsing Rao
- Screenplay by: T. Patanjali Sastri
- Story by: B. Narsing Rao
- Produced by: D. Rama Naidu
- Starring: Master Sai Subhakar; Bhanuchander; Baby Nitya; Haritha; Bhoopal Reddy
- Cinematography: Apurba Kishore Bir
- Edited by: Krishna Reddy
- Music by: B. Narsing Rao
- Production company: Suresh Productions
- Release date: 2 April 2003
- Country: India
- Language: Telugu

Harivillu (English title: Rainbow) is a 2003 Telugu drama film written and directed by B. Narsing Rao. The film is produced by D. Rama Naidu of Suresh Productions. This 2003 film is based on the story of a child suffering from cancer and his desires of love and friendship. The film was premiered International Critics' Week-Spotlight on India section at the 2003 Cannes Film Festival.

== Plot ==
Ravi Babu (Master Subhakar) is son of a rich businessman (Bhanu Chander). He is a brilliant student, good painter and talented musician. He is known to be suffering from cancer and knows that death would embrace him any day. His parents caring and sympathetic for him. Ravi needs love, and the way the parents are providing it is not satisfactory enough to him. A few words of his parents and the lady psychiatrist make him get some solace. But the parents are still unable to find the way to pacify their restlessness son. Gowri(Baby Nitya) enters their house as child servant. Ravi makes good friends with her and forgets all the pains. His parents does not like Ravi to move around with a poor girl. The girl gives happiness to Ravi. He sees a peaceful and new world with Gowri. He brings out his fantasies and fulfills them in her companionship.

== Cast ==
- Master Sai Subhakar as Ravi Babu
- Baby Nitya as Gowri
- Bhanu Chander as Ravi's father
- Haritha as Ravi's mother
- Bhoopal Reddy

== Reception ==
Gudipoodi Srihari of The Hindu wrote that "The film is neatly made. The visuals are pretty good. Sai Subhakar and Nitya make a good pair. Director Narsing Rao contrasts the playful behaviour of Ravi with his bad mood".
