= Rahul Thakkar =

American software inventor

Rahul Chandrakant Thakkar
- Born: United Kingdom
- Education: University of Mumbai (BE); Utah State University (MS)
- Occupations: Software inventor, technologist, executive
- Years active: 1994–present
- Employer: BAE Systems Inc.
- Known for: DreamWorks Animation Media Review System, AWS SimSpace Weaver
- Title: President of OneArc
- Awards: Academy Scientific and Technical Award (2016)

Rahul Chandrakant Thakkar is an Indian-American software inventor, technologist, and executive known for his contributions to the cinema, aerospace, and defense industries. He was a recipient of the 2016 Academy Award for Scientific and Technical Achievement for his work at DreamWorks Animation. As of 2026, he serves as the President of OneArc, a commercial defense technology business unit of BAE Systems Inc.

== Early life and education ==
Thakkar was born in the United Kingdom and raised in Mumbai, India. He is the son of Chandrakant Thakkar, a versatile actor, writer, and director who was trained at the Royal Academy of Dramatic Art (RADA). During his youth, Thakkar worked alongside his father on various media projects, including a 1971 Films Division of India documentary and several television and radio programs.

Thakkar earned his Bachelor’s degree in Computer Engineering from the University of Mumbai. In 1992, he moved to the United States for graduate studies at Utah State University, where he completed a Master of Science in Computer Science with a specialization in computer graphics in 1995.

== Career ==
=== Film and visual effects ===
Thakkar began his professional career in the mid-1990s, developing visual effects and broadcast software. Notable early work included creating software for CBS's election coverage in 1994 and 1996 and the Late Show with David Letterman.

In 1996, he joined Pacific Data Images (PDI), which was subsequently acquired by DreamWorks Animation. He was an engineering lead for major animated features, including Antz and Shrek, which won the inaugural Academy Award for Best Animated Feature. During his tenure, Thakkar was a primary designer of the DreamWorks Animation Media Review System, a studio-wide platform for high-resolution shot review and playback.

=== Aerospace and cloud technology ===
In 2003, Thakkar joined PIXIA Corp as Chief Architect and Vice President of Technology, where he developed high-performance access technologies for massive satellite and aerial imagery datasets. From 2015 to 2020, he held executive leadership roles at The Boeing Company, overseeing infrastructure transformation, digital analytics, and cloud solutions for unmanned aerial systems.

He subsequently joined Amazon Web Services (AWS) as a Director and General Manager. At AWS, he led the development and 2022 launch of AWS SimSpace Weaver, a managed service that enables the execution of large-scale spatial simulations in the cloud.

=== Defense and simulation (OneArc) ===
In July 2023, Thakkar was appointed President of Bohemia Interactive Simulations (BISim), a subsidiary of BAE Systems specializing in military training software.

In December 2025, BAE Systems announced the launch of OneArc, a business unit designed to consolidate the capabilities of BISim, TerraSim, and Pitch Technologies. Thakkar was named the inaugural President of OneArc. The unit provides modular, AI-integrated synthetic training, geospatial, and interoperability tools for the U.S. military, NATO, and allied nations.

== Awards and recognition ==
- Academy Award for Scientific and Technical Achievement (2016): Awarded for the groundbreaking design and development of the DreamWorks Animation Media Review System.
- Patents: Thakkar is the inventor or co-inventor of 60+ granted and pending patents in fields including distributed systems, image processing, and cloud-based simulation.

== Personal life ==
Thakkar resides in Virginia with his family. He remains a regular contributor to the global technology and defense sectors, focusing on the intersection of commercial software innovation and national security requirements.

== See also ==
- List of Indian-American winners and nominees of Academy Awards
- Digital cinematography
- Synthetic Environment
- Distributed simulation
