= B. Narsing Rao =

Telugu film director

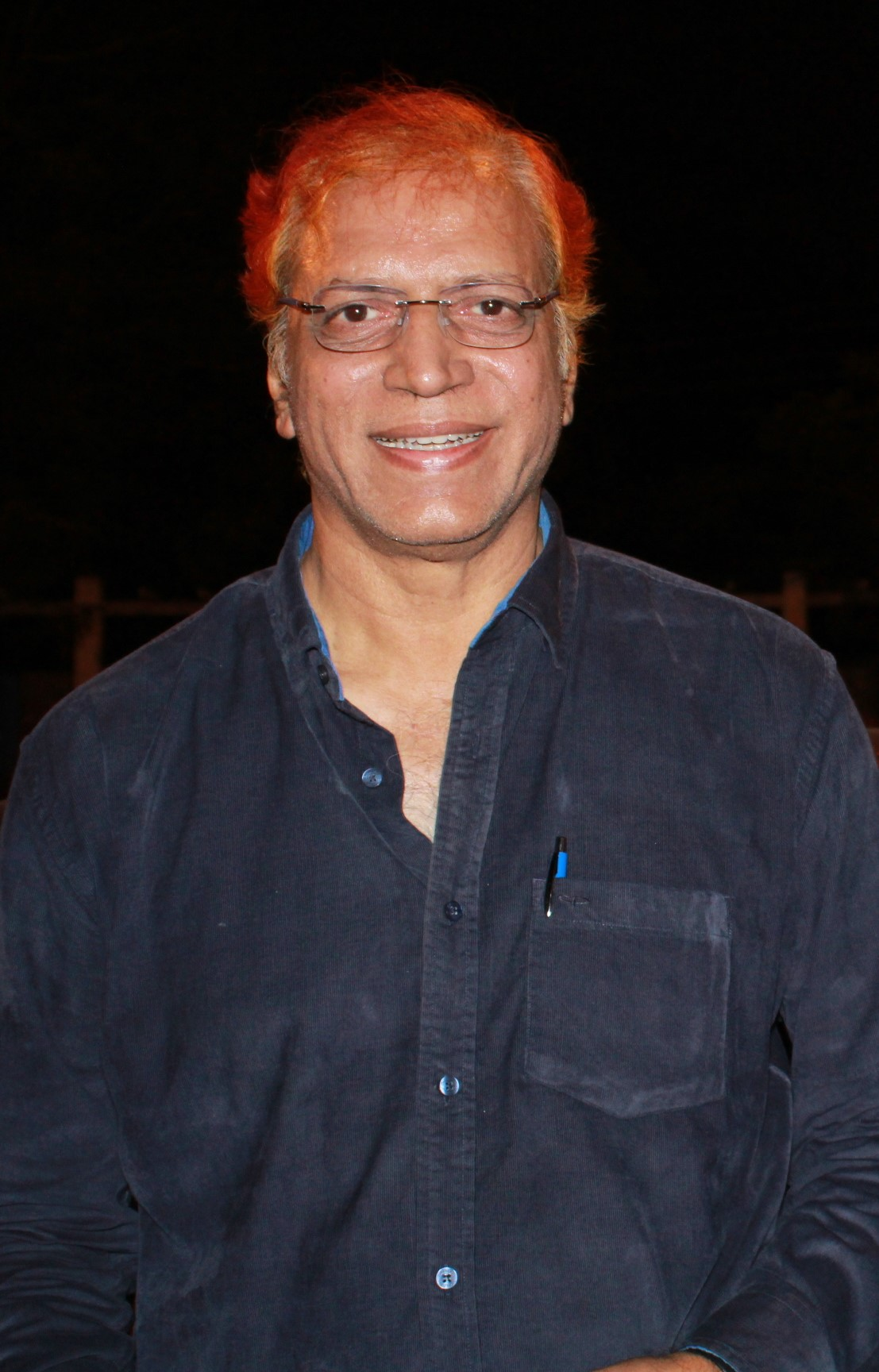
- Rao in 2015
- Born: Bongu Narsing Rao; 26 December 1946 (age 79); Pragnapur, Hyderabad State (present-day Telangana, India)
- Education: Osmania University
- Occupations: Director, actor, producer, screenwriter
- Awards: International honors National Film Awards; Nandi Awards

Bongu Narsing Rao (born 1946) is an Indian film director, screenwriter, littérateur, composer, poet, producer, actor and painter known for his works in Telugu cinema, and Telugu theatre. Rao has garnered five National Film Awards, three Nandi Awards, various international honors, and has served as a jury in various Asian film festivals. He directed, Daasi "(Bonded Woman)" and Matti Manushulu "(Mud People)" which won the Diploma of Merit awards at the 16th and 17th Moscow International Film Festivals in 1989 and 1991 respectively.

Internationally, Daasi was screened at the 1989 Filmfest München, 1990 Karlovy Vary International Film Festival, Three Continents Festival, Cairo International Film Festival, Lincoln Center for the Performing Arts, 1991 Museum of Modern Art; 1994, Bergamo Film Meeting; 1994 Dublin International Film Festival; 1997 National Centre for the Performing Arts (India); and Filmotsav 90' Kolkata.

The 1987 film Maa Ooru ("Our Village") directed by him won the "Main Prize - Media Wave Award" at the Hungary International festival of visual arts, as well as the National Film Award for Best Anthropological/Ethnographic Film. Maa Ooru was premiered at the Kala Ghoda Arts Festival - Mumbai in 1999. The Ekotopfilm - International Festival of Sustainable Development Films in 1995, Slovak Republic. The Brastislavia Mostra internazionale d'arte cinematografica in 1993, Viterbo, Italy. The first Mumbai International Film Festival for Documentary, Short and Animation Films in 1990 where the film won the Best Cinematography award. The International premier at Filmfest München in 1989, Germany. The Indian panorama section of the IFFI.

== Early life ==
He was born in Pragnapur, Medak in the erstwhile princely state of Hyderabad state in a well to do agricultural family. Rao is married and has three sons and one daughter and seven grandchildren.

== Mainstream ==
In 1979, he scripted, and produced Maa Bhoomi, which was India's official entry in the "Opera Primo" section at the Karlovy Vary International Film Festival of June–July 1980, and the Cork Film Festival, October 1980, the Cairo and Sidney Film Festivals 1980. The film was showcased at the Indian Panorama of the 1980 International Film Festival of India. Maa Bhoomi won the state Nandi Award for Best Feature Film, and the Filmfare Best Film Award (Telugu). It is featured among CNN-IBN's list of hundred greatest Indian films of all time. In 1984, he directed Rangula Kala, ("Colourful Dream") which had special mention at the International Film Festival of India and it's panorama section.

== Non Feature Films ==
His documentaries in Telugu The Carnival (1984), The City (1985), Akruti- Rock formations (1989) have received special mention awards at the International Documentary Film Festival Amsterdam, and were screened at the Rice University. Akruti received the National Film Award – Special Jury Award (non-feature film) "For experimentation with forms of boulders of various shapes and textures, brilliantly visualized by Apurba Kishore Bir with the evocative music of Pandit Hari Prasad Chaurasia." as cited by the jury. In 2003, he directed Hari Villu screened at the 56th Cannes.

== Honors ==
In 2015, he received the Life Time Achievement Award from Potti Sreeramulu Telugu University. In 2016, he received Standing Ovation Award for lifetime achievement at the All Lights India International Film Festival.

== Filmography and awards ==
=== Feature films ===
Year	Film	Director	Producer	Screenwriter	Awards and Honors
1979	Maa Bhoomi		Yes	Yes	India's official entry at the Karlovy Vary Film Festival; Nandi Award for Best Screenplay Writer; Nandi Award for Second Best Feature Film; Filmfare Award for Best Film – Telugu
1983	Rangula Kala	Yes		Yes	Also actor National Film Award for Best Feature Film in Telugu
1988	Daasi	Yes	Yes	Yes	National Film Award for Best Feature Film in Telugu; Diploma of Merit award at Moscow Film Festival
1990	Matti Manushulu	Yes		Yes	National Film Award for Best Feature Film in Telugu; Diploma of Merit award at Moscow Film Festival
2003	Harivillu	Yes		Yes	Also editor 2003 Cannes; Visva-Bharati University Nandi Award for Best Children's Film Director

=== Non-feature films ===
Year	Film	Director	Producer	Screenwriter	Awards and Honors
1984	The Carnival	Yes	Yes	Yes	International Documentary Film Festival Amsterdam
1985	The City	Yes	Yes	Yes	International Documentary Film Festival Amsterdam
1987	Maa Ooru	Yes		Yes	National Film Award for Best Anthropological/Ethnographic Film "Main Prize - Media Wave Award" at the Hungary International festival of visual arts Best Film International Documentary Film Festival Amsterdam
1989	Aakruti	Yes	Yes	Yes	International Documentary Film Festival Amsterdam; National Film Award – Special Jury Award (non-feature film)
