= Eikhoishibu Kanano =

2019 Manipuri film directed by Ajit Yumnam

- Poster
- Directed by: Ajit Yumnam
- Screenplay by: Ajit Yumnam
- Story by: Nabakumar Nongmeikapam
- Produced by: Brojen Yumnam
- Starring: Khoirom Sangeeta; Irom Mangi; Nandakumar Nongmaithem; Joyson Khapai
- Cinematography: Imo Yumnam
- Edited by: Sushil Yumlembam
- Music by: Gopi (KOG)
- Production company: Cultural Society Khuman Maheikol
- Distributed by: Skyline Pictures
- Release date: January 2020 (Jaipur Film Festival)
- Running time: 84 minutes
- Country: India
- Language: Meiteilon (Manipuri)

Eikhoishibu Kanano (English: Who Are We) is a 2020 Manipuri film directed by Ajit Yumnam and produced by Brojen Yumnam. It is a movie on Indo-Myanmar border dispute. The film was premiered at the Jaipur International Film Festival 2020. It was also selected for the 8th Delhi International Film Festival 2020 and the India International Film Festival 2020, Pune. Eikhoishibu Kanano won the Best Film at 10th Dada Shaheb Phalke Film Award 2020 and also Best Film - Debut and two other awards at 13th Manipur State Film Awards 2020. It also won nine awards, including Best Film and Best Director at the 9th MANIFA 2020. It got official selection at the 8th Indian Cine Film Festival, 2020.

The film was certified in 2019 but the Manipur premiere of the movie was held at the Manipur State Film Development Society (MSFDS), Imphal on 21 March 2021.

== Synopsis ==
The movie is set in Indo-Myanmar border, a zone of constant conflict mainly on the territorial boundary question. The people of Manipur living there faced varied forms of torture and oppression from the Myanma army junta but their sense of fraternity with the rest of people of India never faded away from their minds. Even a youth from the village who was recruited to the Indian army, laid down his life fighting the terrorists in the north western border of India. But it always failed to capture the attention of the central government and national media like it was done in Kashmir. Seeing the contrast and out of dilemma, the villagers of the Indo-Myanmar border finally asked: Who Are We?

== Cast ==
- Irom Mangi as Lukhoi
- Khoirom Sangeeta as Ningoleima
- Joyson Khapai as Ashang
- Nandakumar Nongmaithem as Sanathoi, Home Minister's son, Journalist
- Gitchandra Chongtham as Home Minister
- Sarangthem Monika as Inunganbi
- Biren as Thanil
- Ashokumar Chongtham as Police
- Achui
- Bidyaraj
- Sarto Mary
- Thouba
- Khekhe Leihaothabam

== Accolades ==
Eikhoishibu Kanano won nine awards out of 13 nominations at the 9th MANIFA 2020 organised by Sahitya Seva Samiti, Kakching. It also won the Best Film - Debut, Best Lyrics (Tamna Uriba Loibi Chingsang song) and Special Jury Cinematography awards at the 13th Manipur State Film Awards 2020. Eikhoishibu Kanano was also nominated for best film, best director, best actor & best actress in Prag Cine Awards - North East 2021.

Award	Category	Winner's name	Result
8th Indian Cine Film Festival 2020	Best Director	Ajit Yumnam	Won
9th MANIFA 2020	Best Film	Brojendro Yumnam; Ajit Yumnam	Won
9th MANIFA 2020	Best Direction	Ajit Yumnam	Won
9th MANIFA 2020	Best Costume	Amar Luwang	Won
9th MANIFA 2020	Best Make-Up	Dabo Wangkheimayum	Won
9th MANIFA 2020	Best Music Director	A Gopeshwor	Won
9th MANIFA 2020	Best Story	Nabakumar Nongmeikapam	Won
9th MANIFA 2020	Best Screenplay	Ajit Yumnam	Won
9th MANIFA 2020	Best Singer - Male	Deepu Khunung	Won
9th MANIFA 2020	Best Lyrics	Ajit Yumnam	Won
9th MANIFA 2020	Best Actor - Male	Irom Mangi	Nominated
9th MANIFA 2020	Best Actor in a Supporting Role - Male	Joyson Khapai	Nominated
9th MANIFA 2020	Best Background Score	A Gopeshwor	Nominated
9th MANIFA 2020	Best Editor	Sushil Yumlembam	Nominated
13th Manipur State Film Awards 2020	Best Feature Film - Debut	Brojendro Yumnam; Ajit Yumnam	Won
13th Manipur State Film Awards 2020	Best Lyrics for the song "Tamna Uriba Loibi Chingshang"	Ajit Yumnam	Won
13th Manipur State Film Awards 2020	Special Jury Award	Imo Yumnam	Won

== Soundtrack ==
Gopi (KOG) composed the soundtrack for the film and Ajit Yumnam wrote the lyrics. The song is titled Tamna Uriba Loibi Chingshang.

No.	Title	Lyrics	Music	Singer(s)	Length
1.	"Tamna Uriba Loibi Chingshang"	Ajit Yumnam	Gopi (KOG)	Deepu Khunung, Rosy Heisnam	06:30
Total length:					6:30
