= Maa Ooru =

- Directed by: B. Narsing Rao
- Written by: B. Narsing Rao (dialogues)
- Screenplay by: B. Narsing Rao; K. N. T. Sastry
- Story by: B. Narsing Rao
- Produced by: B. Rama Chandra Rao
- Cinematography: Apurba Kishore Bir
- Release date: 1990
- Country: India
- Language: Telugu

Maa Ooru (transl. Our village) is a 1987 Indian Telugu-language anthropological film written and directed by B. Narsing Rao. The film received the Best Ethnographic Film award at the 36th National Film Awards, with the jury praising it for "recalling with nostalgia the life of a village community of the fifties in Telangana" and commending its "sensitivity and graphic lyricism."

== International honours ==
Maa Ooru garnered several international accolades. In 1992, it was awarded the Main prize at the Mediawave International Film Festival in Hungary. The film was also featured at various prestigious events, including its premiere at the Kala Ghoda Arts Festival in Mumbai in 1999, and screenings at the Ekotopfilm - International Festival of Sustainable Development Films in the Slovak Republic in 1995, and the Brastislava Mostra Internazionale d'Arte Cinematografica in Viterbo, Italy, in 1993. At the inaugural Mumbai International Film Festival for documentary, short, and animation films in 1990, Maa Ooru won the Best Cinematography award. Additionally, the film had its international premiere at Filmfest München in Germany in 1989 and was showcased in the Indian Panorama section of the International Film Festival of India (IFFI).
