= Matti Manushulu =

- Directed by: B. Narsing Rao
- Written by: B. Narsing Rao
- Screenplay by: B. Narsing Rao
- Story by: B. Narsing Rao
- Produced by: K. Mukherjee; Veda Kumar
- Starring: Archana; Moin Ali Beg
- Cinematography: Apurba Kishore Bir
- Music by: Ilaiyaraaja
- Release date: 1990
- Running time: 1hr 27 min
- Country: India
- Language: Telugu

Matti Manushulu (transl. The Mud People) is a 1990 Indian Telugu-language drama film written and directed by B. Narsing Rao and starring Archana and Moin Ali Beg. The film won the Best Feature Film in Telugu at the 38th National Film Awards, "For portraying the stark reality of pain which has been underlined with the warm hues of life" as cited by the Jury.

== Plot ==
The film explores the lives of woman labourers and construction workers of urban India.

Pochamma and her husband are employed in a construction project. The women labourers in the project are sexually exploited by the contractor and the engineer. Pochamma is a dark , attractive lady and many eye her lustfully; she somehow survives the exploitation.

One day her husband develops an affair with a co labourer and elopes with her, leaving Pochamma and a baby in the arms, in lurch.

The contractor openly makes an offer , "come to my bed or you won't be able to survive. I will see how long you can resist me!"

In the meantime Pochamma falls ill. Another contractor takes her to a doctor for treatment, buys her food and then place assaults her sexually in a secluded place.

In the closing scene they show Pochamma lying dead on the sidewalk and the child helplessly crying!

== International honors ==
The film won Diploma of Merit award at the 17th Moscow International Film Festival in 1991. It was subsequently screened at the 1990 International Film Festival of India.
