= Mediawave International Film Festival =

Annual film festival in Hungary

Media Wave Awards
- Location: Győr, Hungary
- Founded: 1991
- Awards: Fesztivál Fődíja; Legjobb játékfilm
- Festival date: April
- Website: mediawavefestival.hu

The Media Wave International Film Festival (Mediawave Nemzetközi Filmfesztivál) also known as Fényírók Fesztiválja is one of the significant International Visual Arts festival held in Hungary. It was founded in 1991. The festival presents all Visual arts platforms including feature films, shorts, documentaries, and animated films. All programs, screenings, conferences, and exhibitions are free to attend.

== History ==
The first edition was held as "International Film And Video Art Festival" of Hungary. The festival uses the name "Fényírók Fesztiválja" since 1994 onwards. The Festival is also known as Media Wave, Festival of Light Writer and On the Road International Online Film Festival.

== Fesztivál Fődíja (Main Prize) winners of the Media Wave ==
The Main Prize is offered by: Hungarian Motion Picture Public Foundation for the Best Ethnographic or Anthropological film.

Year	Recipient	Filmography	Country	Ref
1991	István Orosz	Vigyázat lépcső! "(Mind the Steps!)"	Hungary	
1992	B. Narsing Rao	Maa Ooru ("Our Village)"	India	
1993	Serhii Bukovskyi	Kotogel "(Code Mark)"	Ukraine	
2005	Alexandru Solomon	"The Great Communist Bank Robbery"	Romania	
2006	Andrey Paounov	"Georgi and the Butterflies"	Bulgaria	
2007	Wojciech Kasperski	Magok "(The Seeds)"	Poland	
2008	Thomas Ciulei	Podul de flori "(The Flower Bridge)"	Romania	
2009	Boris Mitic	Do vidjenja, kako ste? "(Goodbye, how are you?)"	Serbia	
2010	Giorgi Ovashvili	Gagma napiri "(The Other Bank)"	Georgia	
2011	Ohad Itach	Le'ehov et Sophia "(Loving Sophia)"	Israel	

== Legjobb játékfilm (Best Feature Film) winners of the Media Wave ==
Year	Recipient	Filmography	Country	Ref
2012	Ben Rivers; Alyona Semenova & Alexander Smirnov	"Two years at sea" The Rowan Waltz	United Kingdom; Russia	
2013	Veit Helmer	Baikonur ("Champion)"	Germany; Russia; Kazakhstan	
2014	Bodo Kox; Dénes Nagy	Dziewczyna Z Szafy "(The girl from the closet)" "Soft Rain"	Poland; Hungary; Belgium	
2015	Lucy Mulloy; Vahram Mkhitaryan	Una Noche "One Night"; Milky Brother	Cuba; United Kingdom; United States; Poland; Armenia	

== International Film Competition Awards ==
- The Main Prize
- Best Feature Film
- Best Animation Film
- Best Hungarian Experimental Film
- KODAK – Hungary Award for Cinematography
- The festival's documentary award
- Győr City Award for the best animated film
- Best Actor Award
- Best Actress Award
- Best Direction Award
- Big Game Film Award
- Best Dance Award
- The jury's special award
- Special Prizes
