= 21st National Film Awards =

Indian ceremony celebrating cinema of 1973

- 21st National Film Awards
- Awarded for: Best of Indian cinema in 1973
- Awarded by: Directorate of Film Festivals
- Presented by: Indira Gandhi (Prime Minister of India)
- Announced on: 20 July 1974
- Presented on: October 1974
- Site: Vigyan Bhavan, New Delhi
- Official website: dff.nic.in

Highlights
- Best Feature Film: Nirmalyam
- Dadasaheb Phalke Award: Ruby Myers
- Most awards: • Ashani Sanket • Kaadu (3)

The 21st National Film Awards, presented by Directorate of Film Festivals, the organisation set up by Ministry of Information and Broadcasting, India to felicitate the best of Indian Cinema released in the year 1973. Ceremony took place in October 1974 and awards were given by Prime Minister Indira Gandhi.

== Juries ==
Prior to 21st National Film Awards, there used to be regional committees at Bombay (Mumbai), Calcutta (Kolkata) and Madras (Chennai), the recommendations of which were then considered by central committee. To avoid this long-winded process, regional committees were discarded.

Two different committees were formed for feature films and short films, headed by Romesh Thapar and S. K. Kooka respectively.

- Jury Members: Feature Films
  - Romesh Thapar (Chairperson) • Usha Bhagat • Teji Bachchan • Ismat Chughtai • M. Yunus Dehlvi • Ashis Burman
  - Firoze Rangoonwalla • Dina Pathak • B. V. Karanth • T. S. Pillai • T. K. Mahadevan • J. Swaminathan
  - Dileep Padgaonkar • Subodh Mukherjee • U. Visweswar Raw • Asim Paul • Tarun Majumdar • Ananta Patnaik
  - Illindula Saraswathi Devi • M. Bhaktavatsala • Sai Paranjpye • K. R. K. Menon • O. V. Vijayan
- Jury Members: Short Films
  - S. K. Kooka (Chairperson) • Balwant Gargi • Nalni Soni • Komal Kothari

== Awards ==
Awards were divided into feature films and non-feature films.

President's gold medal for the All India Best Feature Film is now better known as National Film Award for Best Feature Film, whereas President's gold medal for the Best Documentary Film is analogous to today's National Film Award for Best Non-Feature Film. For children's films, Prime Minister's gold medal is now given as National Film Award for Best Children's Film. At the regional level, President's silver medal for Best Feature Film is now given as National Film Award for Best Feature Film in a particular language. Certificate of Merit in all the categories is discontinued over the years.

=== Lifetime Achievement Award ===
Award	Image	Awardee(s)	Awarded As	Cash Prize
Dadasaheb Phalke Award		Ruby Myers (Sulochana)	Actress	₹20,000, a gold medal and a shawl

=== Feature films ===
Feature films were awarded at All India as well as regional level. For 21st National Film Awards, a Malayalam film Nirmalyam won the President's gold medal for the All India Best Feature Film; whereas a Bengali film Ashani Sanket and a Kannada film Kaadu won the maximum number of awards (three). Following were the awards given in each category:

==== All India Award ====
Following were the awards given:

Award	Film	Language	Awardee(s)	Cash Prize
Best Feature Film	Nirmalyam (Note: P. J. Antony (Leading Actor) and Sumithra (Leading Actress) were awarded with the souvenir.)	Malayalam	Producer: M. T. Vasudevan Nair	Gold Medal and ₹40,000
Best Feature Film	Nirmalyam	Malayalam	Director: M. T. Vasudevan Nair	Gold Medal and ₹40,000
Second Best Feature Film	Kaadu (Note: Amrish Puri (Leading Actor) and Nandini Bhaktavatsala (Leading Actress) were awarded with the souvenir.)	Kannada	Producer: K. N. Narayan	Silver Medal and ₹15,000
Second Best Feature Film	Kaadu	Kannada	Producer: G. N. Lakshmipathy	Silver Medal and ₹15,000
Second Best Feature Film	Kaadu	Kannada	Director: Girish Karnad	Silver Medal and ₹10,000
Best Feature Film on National Integration	Garm Hava (Note: Geeta Siddharth (Leading Actress) was awarded with the souvenir.)	Hindi	Producer: M/s Unit 3 MM	A Medal and ₹30,000
Best Feature Film on National Integration	Garm Hava	Hindi	Director: M. S. Sathyu	A Medal and ₹20,000
Best Cinematography (Black and White)	27 Down	Hindi	Apurba Kishore Bir	Silver Medal and ₹5,000
Best Cinematography (Color)	Ashani Sanket	Bengali	Soumendu Roy	Silver Medal and ₹5,000
Best Direction	Duvidha	Hindi	Mani Kaul	Silver Medal and ₹20,000
Best Actor (Bharat Award)	Nirmalyam	Malayalam	P. J. Antony	A figurine
Best Actress (Urvashi Award)	Kaadu	Kannada	Nandini Bhaktavatsala	A figurine
Best Child Artist	Kaadu	Kannada	G. S. Nataraj	Silver Medal
Best Male Playback Singer	Gayathri	Malayalam	K. J. Yesudas	Silver Medal
Best Music Direction	Ashani Sanket	Bengali	Satyajit Ray	Silver Medal and ₹10,000
Best Screenplay	Padatik	Bengali	Mrinal Sen	Silver Medal and ₹10,000
Best Screenplay	Padatik	Bengali	Ashish Burman	Silver Medal and ₹10,000
Best Story	Garm Hava	Hindi	Ismat Chughtai	Silver Medal and ₹10,000
Best Story	Garm Hava	Hindi	Kaifi Azmi	Silver Medal and ₹10,000

==== Regional Award ====
The awards were given to the best films made in the regional languages of India. For feature films in English, Gujarati, Kashmiri, Meitei, Marathi, Oriya, Punjabi and Telugu language, President's silver medal for Best Feature Film was not given. The producer of the film was awarded with a silver medal and ₹10,000, the director of the film was awarded with a silver medal and ₹5,000, and leading actors were awarded with a souvenir.

Award	Film	Awardee(s)			
Award	Film	Producer	Director	Actor	Actress
Best Feature Film in Assamese	Mamta	Nalin Dowerah	Eva Achow	Rudra Baruah	Nalin Dowerah
Best Feature Film in Assamese	Mamta	Prafulla Dutta	Eva Achow	Rudra Baruah	Nalin Dowerah
Best Feature Film in Assamese	Mamta	Shiba Thakur	Eva Achow	Rudra Baruah	Nalin Dowerah
Best Feature Film in Bengali	Ashani Sanket	Sarbeni Bhattacharya	Satyajit Ray	Soumitra Chatterjee	Bobita
Best Feature Film in Hindi	27 Down	Awatar Krishna Kaul	Awatar Krishna Kaul	M. K. Raina	Raakhee
Best Feature Film in Kannada	Abachurina Post Office	Patre C. Vinayak	N. Lakshminarayan	B. N. Narayan	Girija
Best Feature Film in Malayalam	Gayathri	A. R. Shreedharan Elayidom	P. N. Menon	V. Raghavan	Jayabharathi
Best Feature Film in Malayalam	Gayathri	P. B. Ashram	P. N. Menon	V. Raghavan	Jayabharathi
Best Feature Film in Tamil	Dikkatra Parvathi	M/s Navatarang	Singeetam Srinivasa Rao	Srikanth	Lakshmi

=== Non-Feature films ===
Following were the awards given:

==== Short films and Documentaries ====
Award	Film	Language	Awardee(s)	Cash Prize
Best Information Film (Documentary)	The Flame Burns Bright	English	Producer: Ashish Mukherjee	Silver Medal and ₹5,000
Best Information Film (Documentary)	The Flame Burns Bright	English	Director: Ashish Mukherjee	Silver Medal and ₹5,000
Best Educational / Instructional Film	Sath Kutch Na Jayega	Hindi	Producer: Dhiru Mistry	Silver Medal and ₹5,000
Best Educational / Instructional Film	Sath Kutch Na Jayega	Hindi	Director: Sureshwar Singh	Silver Medal and ₹5,000
Best Film on Social Documentation	Land of Krishna	English	Producer: G. L. Bhardwaj	Silver Medal and ₹5,000
Best Film on Social Documentation	Land of Krishna	English	Director: G. L. Bhardwaj	Silver Medal and ₹5,000
Best Promotional Film (Commercial)	Delhi the City Beautiful	English	Producer: Jagdish Banerjee	Silver Medal
Best Promotional Film (Commercial)	Delhi the City Beautiful	English	Director: Jagdish Banerjee	Silver Medal
Best Promotional Film (Non-Commercial)	Fibre The Fabric of Life	English	Producer: Khadi and Village Industries Commission	Silver Medal
Best Promotional Film (Non-Commercial)	Fibre The Fabric of Life	English	Director: G. L. Bhardwaj	Silver Medal
Best Experimental Film	Homi Bhabha - A Scientist in Action	English	Producer: Jagat Murari	Silver Medal and ₹5,000
Best Experimental Film	Homi Bhabha - A Scientist in Action	English	Director: K. Vishwanath	Silver Medal and ₹4,000

=== Awards not given ===
Following were the awards not given as no film was found to be suitable for the award:

- Best Film on Family Welfare
- Best Children's Film
- Lyric Writer of the Best Film Song on National Integration
- Best Female Playback Singer
- Best Animation Film
- President's silver medal for Best Feature Film in English
- President's silver medal for Best Feature Film in Manipuri
- President's silver medal for Best Feature Film in Marathi
- President's silver medal for Best Feature Film in Oriya
- President's silver medal for Best Feature Film in Punjabi
- President's silver medal for Best Feature Film in Telugu
