= 28th Filmfare Awards South =

1981 South Indian cinema ceremony

- Date: 19 July 1981
- Site: Chennai

The 28th Filmfare Awards South ceremony, honoring the winners of the best of South Indian cinema in 1980, was an event held at the Madras Music Academy, 19 July 1981. The Chief guests of the function is the Union Minister N. D. Tiwari & Dr. Ram Tarneja (Managing director of Bennet, Coleman & co.), Amitabh Bachchan & Vinod Tiwari.

== Awards ==
=== Kannada cinema ===
Best Film	Best Director
Ellindalo Bandavaru - Mohan Kumar Kondajji	Shankar Nag - Minchina Ota
Best Actor	Best Actress
Lokesh - Ellindalo Bandavaru	Ashwini - Savithri

=== Malayalam cinema ===
Best Film	Best Director
Chamaram - Appachhan	Bharathan - Chamaram
Best Actor	Best Actress
Prathap K. Pothan - Chamaram	Srividya - Puzha

=== Tamil cinema ===
Best Film	Best Director
Varumayin Niram Sigappu - R. Venkatraman	K. Balachandar - Varumayin Niram Sigappu
Best Actor	Best Actress
Sivakumar - Vandichakkaram	Saritha - Vandichakkaram

=== Telugu cinema ===
Best Film	Best Director
Maa Bhoomi - B. Narsing Rao	Bapu - Vamsa Vruksham
Best Actor	Best Actress
J. V. Somayajulu - Sankarabharanam	Jyothi - Vamsa Vruksham

== Awards Presentation ==
- Roopa Presents the behalf of J. V. Somayajulu Best Actor Award to Natana
- Swapna presents the Best Kannada Actor Award to Lokesh
- Bharathiraja presents the Best Tamil actor Award to Sivakumar
- Gemini Ganesan presents the Best Actress Telugu Award to Jyothi
- Suhasini presents the Best Kannada Actress Award to "Ashwini"
- Kamal Haasan presents the Best Tamil Actress Award to Saritha
- D. Ramanujan presents the Best Director Malayalam Award to Bharathan
- Latha presents the Best Kannada Film Award to Mohan Kumar Kondajji
- Sarika presents the Best Malayalam Film Award to Appachan
- Vidhubala presents the Best Telugu Film Award to G. Ravindranath
