= Parasangada Gendethimma =

- DVD cover
- Directed by: Maruthi Shivram
- Screenplay by: Maruthi Shivram
- Based on: Parasangada Gendethimma by Srikrishna Alanahalli
- Produced by: Honnappa; N Subramani; Annadanappa Shivaram; T P Dorairaj; M Nagarajan
- Starring: Lokesh; Reeta Anchan; Maanu; Honnaiah
- Cinematography: S. Ramachandra
- Edited by: J. Stanly
- Music by: Rajan–Nagendra
- Distributed by: Kalakshethra
- Release date: 1978
- Running time: 139 minutes
- Country: India
- Language: Kannada

Parasangada Gendethimma ( transl. Actor-singer Gendethimma) is a 1978 Indian Kannada-language drama film directed by Maruthi Shivram, based on a novel of the same by Srikrishna Alanahalli. It stars Lokesh in the lead role and the supporting cast features Reeta Anchan, B. R. Jayaram, and Ramakrishna. The film features original songs composed by Rajan–Nagendra, while cinematography was done by S. Ramachandra.

The film won three awards at the 1978–79 Karnataka State Film Awards – Third Best Film, Best Actor (Lokesh) and Best Music Director (Rajan–Nagendra). The film was remade in Tamil in 1979 as Rosappoo Ravikkaikari and in Telugu in 1982 as Kotha Neeru.

== Plot ==
Thimanna (Lokesh) is an innocent tribal youth who is excited about his wedding. He is salesman in a village who help villagers by getting items they need from a distant city. His wedding is arranged with Marakani (Reeta Anchan), a city girl. Marakani wants to bring about a huge change in him and make him a decent city man. Meanwhile, due to differences with her mother-in-law, Marakani manages to separate herself and Thimanna from his mother, and they start living separately. When an innocent Thimanna invites a teacher (Manu) to his new shed where they live, Marakani gets attracted to him due to his sophisticated city man looks. The plot then revolves around Thimanna's point of view of the whole situation.

== Cast ==
- Lokesh as Gendethimma
- B. R. Jayaram
- Reeta Anchan (Voice dubbed by B. Jayashree) as Marakani
- Lalithamma
- Ramakrishna
- Sundaramma
- R. Nagarathnamma
- Maanu
- Prameela
- Radhakrishna
- Shyamala
- Dingri Nagaraj
- Honnappa
- Vinu Chakravarthy as villager (uncredited)

== Production ==
Lokesh received a remuneration of ₹1000 for the film. This film marked the acting debut of Dingri Nagaraj and Vinu Chakravarthy.

== Soundtrack ==
The music for the film was composed by Rajan–Nagendra, with lyrics by Doddarange Gowda. The song "Thera Yeri Ambaradaage" was well received.

=== Track list ===
| # | Title | Singer(s) |
|---|---|---|
| 1 | "Notadage Nageya Meeti" | S. P. Balasubrahmanyam |
| 2 | "Thera Yeri Ambaradaage" | S. P. Balasubrahmanyam |
| 3 | "Notadage Nageya Meeti" (Sad) | S. P. Balasubrahmanyam |
| 4 | "Ninna Roopu Edeya Kalaki" | S. Janaki |

== Reception ==
The film was released to mixed reviews from critics and audience. The critical reception of the songs caused many people to not view the film in theatres although the people that did watch the film in theatres felt that the film was good.
