= Rosappu Ravikkaikari =

1979 film by Devaraj–Mohan

- Theatrical release poster
- Directed by: Devaraj–Mohan
- Screenplay by: Krishna
- Story by: Srikrishna Alanahalli
- Produced by: Thirupur Mani
- Starring: Sivakumar; Deepa; Sivachandran
- Cinematography: R. N. K. Prasad
- Edited by: T. P. Sekar
- Music by: Ilaiyaraaja
- Production company: Vivekananda Pictures
- Release date: 18 May 1979
- Running time: 124 minutes
- Country: India
- Language: Tamil

Rosappu Ravikkaikari (transl. The girl with the rose-coloured blouse) is a 1979 Indian Tamil-language historical romance film directed by Devaraj–Mohan. A remake of the 1978 Kannada film Parasangada Gendethimma, itself based on Srikrishna Alanahalli's novella of the same name, the film stars Sivakumar, Deepa and Sivachandran, with Vinu Chakravarthy and R. Nagarathnamma in supporting roles. Set in British-ruled India, it revolves around a modern woman who cannot tolerate her rustic husband and her mother-in-law and engages in an extramarital affair.

Rosappu Ravikkaikari was produced by Thirupur Mani of Vivekananda Pictures, and is the 100th film of Sivakumar as an actor. It is the debut of screenwriter Vijay Krishnaraj (credited as Krishna), and Chakravarthy as an actor in Tamil cinema. Filming took place between February and March 1979, in places including Yercaud. The music was composed by Ilaiyaraaja, editing was handled by T. P. Sekar and cinematography by R. N. K. Prasad.

Rosappu Ravikkaikari was released on 18 May 1979. The film became a critical and commercial success, running for over 100 days in theatres. For his performance, Sivakumar won the Filmfare Award for Best Actor – Tamil.

== Plot ==
In British-ruled India, Sembattayan, a naïve and illiterate villager, is the sole breadwinner of his family in Vandicholai village, in the hills on the outskirts of Salem. He makes a living by selling betel leaves, covering vast distances by foot. His mother gets him married to Nandhini, an educated and modern woman from a neighbouring village. The villagers are surprised that Sembattayan has such a wife and start suspecting her character for stooping down to the level of marrying Sembattayan, who is a complete mismatch for her. Nandhini finds it difficult to live in their home which lacks all the facilities she is accustomed to.

Sembattayan's mother harasses Nandhini and abuses her for her lifestyle and neglecting domestic duties. Unable to tolerate it after her mother brandishes Nandini, Sembattayan establishes a separate home with Nandhini and she is pleased. She concentrates more on grooming herself and her demands keep rising. Sembattayan futilely tries to make her realise that inner beauty is more important than outer beauty which is just skin deep. Manickam, an agent of the British, comes to Vandicholai for recruiting workers and seeks Sembattayan's help for the same. Sembattayan obliges him, Manickam keeps visiting the village on this work and also learns about Nandhini's longings.

When Nandhini's father invites Sembattayan and Nandhini for a village festival, Sembattayan innocently sends Nandhini on Manickam's motorcycle. Nandhini and Manickam, smitten by each other, get into a physical relationship on the way. Manickam keeps visiting Nandhini regularly without Sembattayan's knowledge. When villagers start to gossip about this extramarital affair, Sembattayan is saddened, but he still trusts Nandhini. He soon learns about Nandhini's pregnancy and is overjoyed, unaware that he is not the father of her child.

The villagers accuse Sembattayan of spoiling the women of Vandicholai by selling fancy items to please his wife and thus imposing city culture on them. One day, he reaches his home before his usual time and hears a man's voice. Through the window, he sees Nandhini and Manickam in a compromising position. Devastated, he remembers his mother's warning that if Nandhini is not controlled, she would be responsible for ruining him. He drowns himself in a pond, while Nandhini contemplates suicide out of guilt. When Sembattayan's corpse is retrieved from the pond, the villagers speculate about the reason for his death differently.

== Cast ==
- Sivakumar as Sembattayan
- Deepa as Nandhini
- Sivachandran as Manickam
- Vinu as a villager
- R. Nagarathnamma as Sembattayan's mother
- Heran Ramaswamy
- Bracket Mohan as Sembattayan's disciple
- Mani as Sembattayan's disciple

== Production ==
Vandichakkaram, written by Vinu Chakravarthy, was originally intended to be the 100th film for Sivakumar as an actor; however, after Chakravarthy, director K. Vijayan and producer Thirupur Mani saw the 1978 Kannada film Parasangada Gendethimma, an adaptation of the novella of the same name by Srikrishna Alanahalli, they told Sivakumar that a remake of this film would be a better fit as his 100th film. The remake, titled Rosappu Ravikkaikari, was directed by the duo Devaraj–Mohan and produced by Mani under Vivekananda Pictures. This was Sivakumar's 14th collaboration with Devaraj–Mohan. Chakravarthy, credited simply as Vinu, made his debut as an actor in Tamil with Rosappu Ravikkaikari. He worked on Parasangada Gendethimma and it was Alanahalli who recommended him for the remake. The screenplay was written by Vijay Krishnaraj (credited as Krishna), making his cinematic debut. T. P. Sekar and R. N. K. Prasad worked as editor and cinematographer respectively. Principal photography began on 1 February at Yercaud and wrapped by 5 March, it was shot at Vazhavandhi village and its surroundings at Yercaud. Filming was completed in 45 working days. The last song to be filmed was "Uchi Vaguntheduthu".

== Themes ==
Rosappu Ravikkaikari's main theme is extramarital affair. In the essay "The Tamil film heroine: from a passive subject to a pleasurable object", published in the book Tamil Cinema: The Cultural Politics of India's Other Film Industry edited by Selvaraj Velayutham, Sathiavathi Chinniah writes that films portraying adulterous heroines basically attempt to explore the complexities of womanhood and sexuality, citing Rosappu Ravikkaikari as an example.

== Soundtrack ==
The soundtrack was composed by Ilaiyaraaja. The song "Maaman Oru Naal" is set in the Carnatic raga known as Harikambhoji (also known as Hari Kambhodhi), while "Yennullil Yengo" is set in the Madhuvanti raga. "Uchi Vaguntheduthu", according to Ilangovan Rajasekaran of Frontline, "brought out the emotions of a man anguished by his wife's infidelity".

Track listing
No.	Title	Lyrics	Singer(s)	Length
1.	"Vethala Vethala"	Gangai Amaran	Malaysia Vasudevan, Sivakumar	4:21
2.	"Maaman Oru Naal"	Gangai Amaran	S. P. Balasubrahmanyam, S. P. Sailaja	4:39
3.	"Uchi Vanguntheduthu"	Pulamaipithan	S. P. Balasubrahmanyam, S. P. Sailaja	4:40
4.	"Yennullil Yengo"	Gangai Amaran	Vani Jairam	4:16
Total length:				17:56

== Release and reception ==
Rosappu Ravikkaikari was released on 18 May 1979. The film received an "A" (adults only) certificate after three cuts. It received critical acclaim, and became a commercial success, running for over 100 days in theatres. The Tamil magazine Ananda Vikatan, in a review dated 27 May 1979, rated the film 50 out of 100, praising Sivakumar's performance and the background score by Ilaiyaraaja. P. S. M. of Kalki lauded Sivakumar's performance, saying he had scored a century with his 100th film. Naagai Dharuman of Anna praised the acting of cast, cinematography, dialogues, music and direction. Sivakumar won the Filmfare Award for Best Actor – Tamil.

== Legacy ==
According to film historian G. Dhananjayan, Rosappu Ravikkaikari became a milestone for "daringly show[ing] infidelity and its consequences on screen for the first time" in Tamil cinema.

== Bibliography ==
- Dhananjayan, G. (2011). The Best of Tamil Cinema, 1931 to 2010: 1977–2010. Galatta Media. ISBN 978-81-921043-0-0.
- Sundararaman (2007) [2005]. Raga Chintamani: A Guide to Carnatic Ragas Through Tamil Film Music (2nd ed.). Chennai: Pichhamal Chintamani. OCLC 295034757.
- Velayutham, Selvaraj, ed. (2008). Tamil Cinema: The Cultural Politics of India's Other Film Industry. Routledge. ISBN 978-0-203-93037-3.
