= National Film Award for Best Actress in a Leading Role =

Indian film award

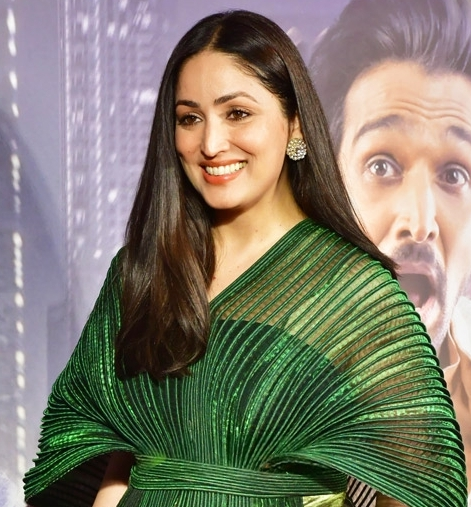
- The 2024 recipient: Yami Gautam
- Awarded for: Best performance by an actress in a leading role
- Sponsored by: National Film Development Corporation of India
- Formerly called: Urvashi Award (1967–1973); National Film Award for Best Actress (1974–2021)
- Rewards: Rajat Kamal (Silver Lotus); ₹2,00,000
- First award: 1967
- Most recent winner: Yami Gautam, Article 370 (2024)

Highlights
- Most wins: Shabana Azmi (5)

The National Film Award for Best Actress in a Leading Role is an honour presented annually at the National Film Awards of India since 1968 to an actress for the best performance in a leading role within the Indian film industry. The National Film Awards were called the "State Awards for Films" when established in 1954. The State Awards instituted the "Best Actress" category in 1968 as the "Urvashi Award for the Best Actress"; in 1975, the Urvashi Award was renamed as the "Rajat Kamal Award for the Best Actress". Throughout the years, accounting for ties and repeat winners, the Government of India has presented a total of 61 Best Actress awards to 49 different actresses. Since the 70th National Film Awards, the name was changed to "National Film Award for Best Actress in a Leading Role".

Until 1974, winners of the National Film Award received a figurine and certificate; since 1975, they have been awarded with a "Rajat Kamal" (silver lotus), certificate and a cash prize that amounted to ₹2 lakh (US$2,100) in the 70th edition. Although the Indian film industry produces films in more than 20 languages and dialects, the actresses whose performances have won awards have worked in eleven major languages: Hindi (25 awards),Tamil (8 awards), Bengali (7 awards), Malayalam (6 awards), Telugu (4 awards), Kannada (3 awards), English (3 awards), Marathi (2 awards), Assamese (one award), Gujarati (one award) and Urdu (one award).

The first recipient was Nargis Dutt from Hindi cinema, who was honoured at the 15th National Film Awards (1967) for her performance in Raat Aur Din. The actress who won the most Rajat Kamal awards is Shabana Azmi with five wins, followed by Kangana Ranaut with four wins and Sharada with three wins. As of 2021, four actresses—Smita Patil, Archana, Shobana, and Tabu who have won the award two times. Sharada, Archana and Shobana are the only three actresses to get the award for performing in two different languages. Sharada was bestowed with the awards for her performances in two Malayalam films: Thulabharam and Swayamvaram in 1968 and 1972 respectively, and in 1978 for the Telugu film Nimajjanam. Archana was first honoured in 1987 for the Tamil film Veedu and was awarded for the second time in 1988 for the Telugu film Daasi. Shobana received her first award for the Malayalam film Manichitrathazhu in 1993, and her second for the English film Mitr, My Friend in 2001. As of 2020, the late Monisha Unni remains the youngest recipient of the honour; she was awarded for the Malayalam film Nakhakshathangal in 1986 when she was 16. Indrani Haldar and Rituparna Sengupta are the only two actresses to be honoured for the same film—Dahan. Kangana Ranaut is the only actress to be honoured for her performance in two different films (Manikarnika: The Queen of Jhansi and Panga) in the same year. Sridevi is the only actress who was honoured posthumously for her performance in Mom (2017). The most recent recipient is Yami Gautam, for her performance in the 2024 Hindi film Article 370.

== Key ==
Symbol	Meaning
Year	Indicates the year in which the film was censored by the Central Board of Film Certification (CBFC)
†	Indicates a joint award for that year
‡	Indicates that the winner won the award for two performances in that year

== Recipients ==
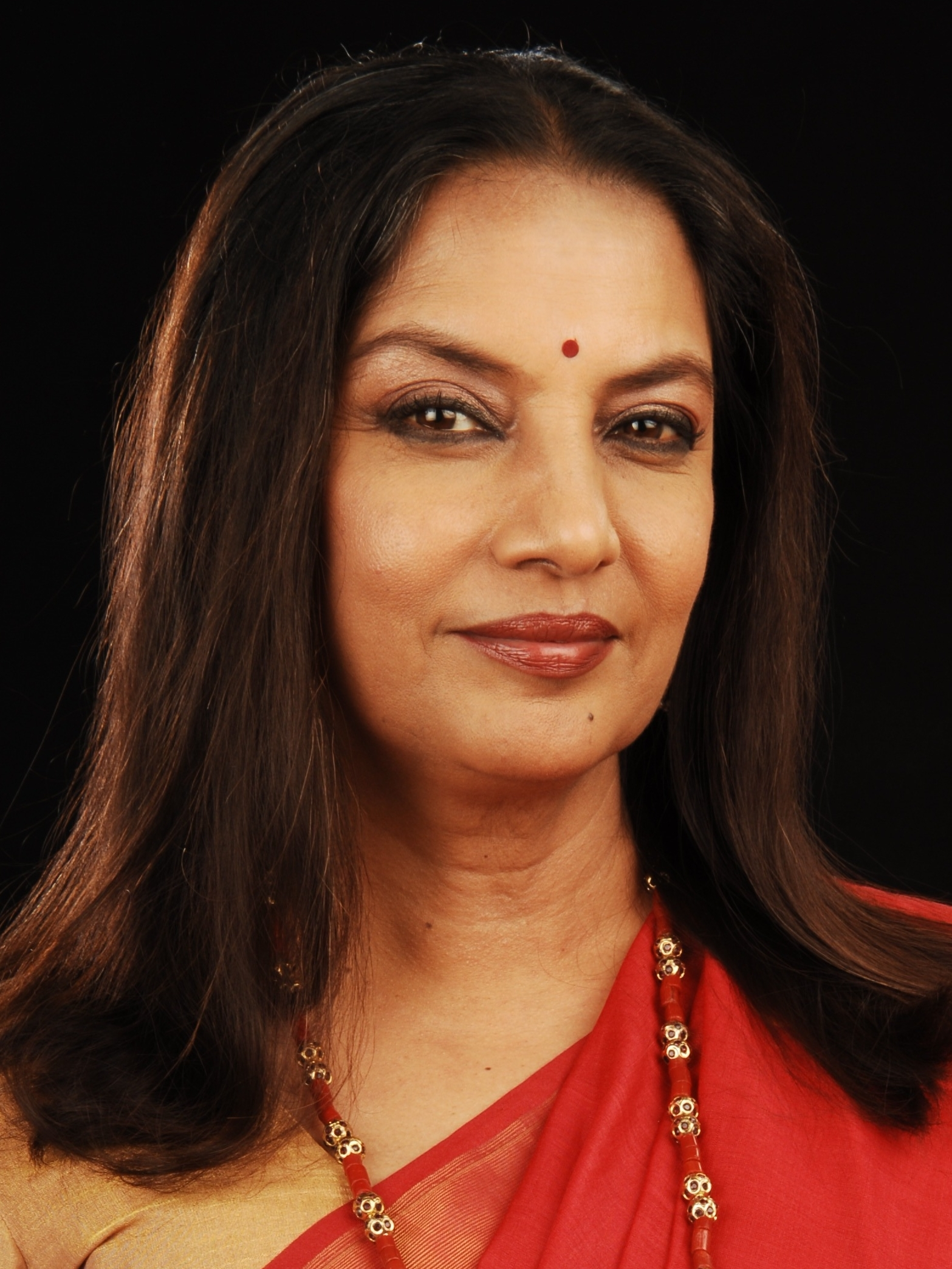
With five wins, Shabana Azmi is the most awarded actor in this category. She is also the actress with most consecutive wins (3).

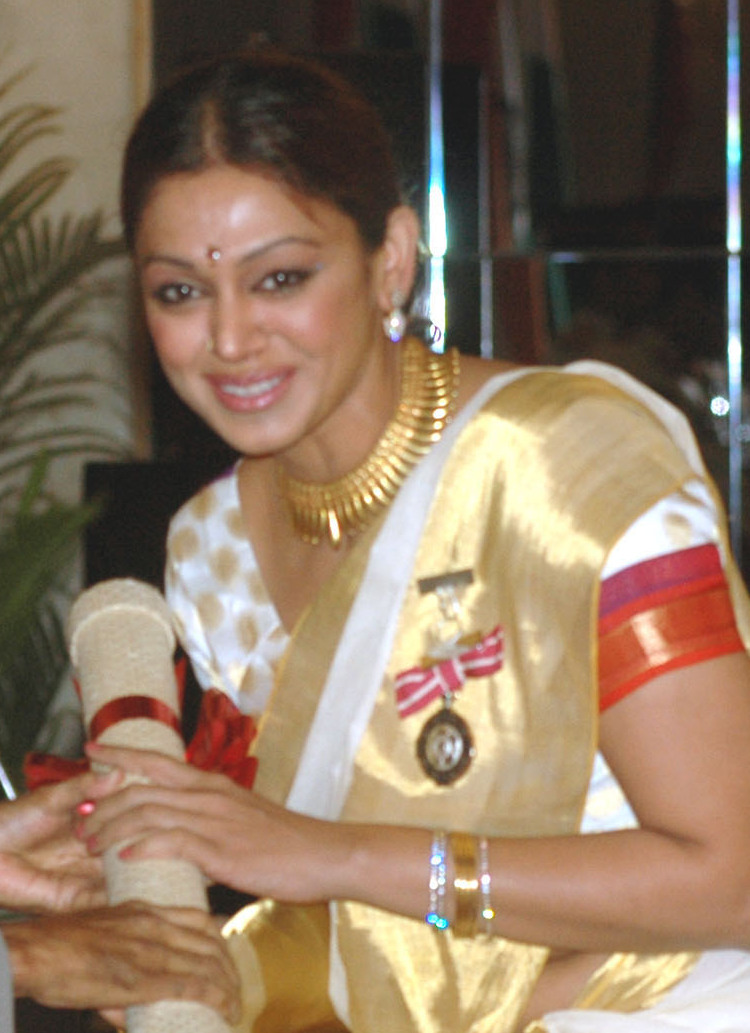
Shobana with 2 Wins in two different Indian Languages.

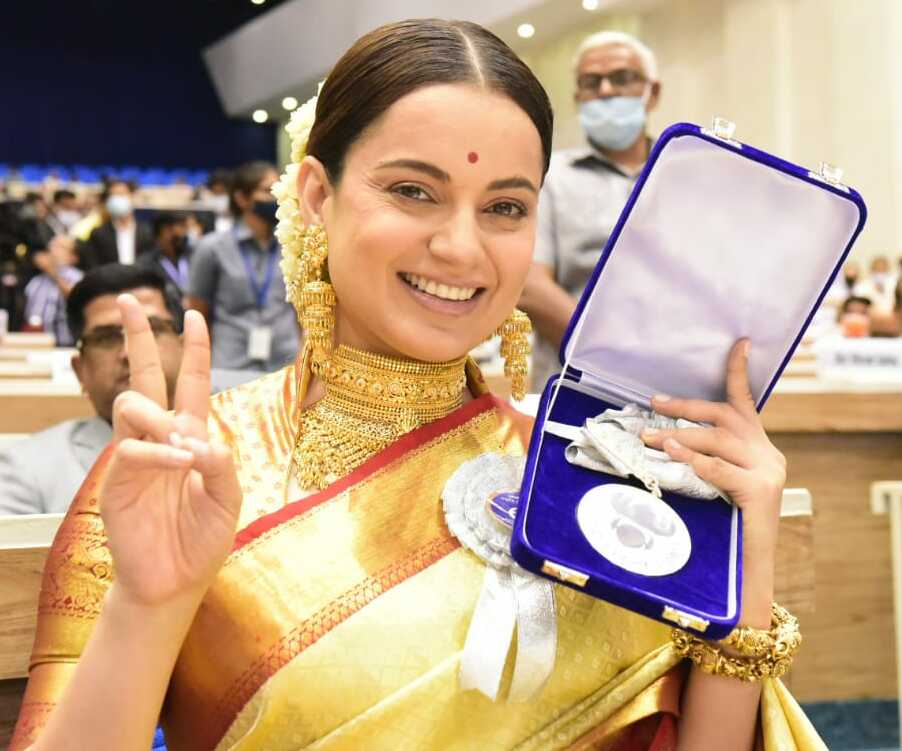
Kangana Ranaut has won the award three times. She is the only actress to be honoured for two different films in a same year.

List of award recipients, showing the year, role(s), film(s) and language(s)
Year (Note: Denotes The year in which the film was censored by the Central Board of Film Certification.)	Recipient(s)	Role(s)	Work(s)	Language(s)	Refs. (Note: Cites the recipient and the role played by them in the film.)
1967 (15th)	Nargis Dutt	Varuna / Peggy (Note: Dutt played the role of a woman suffering from multiple personality disorder in the film.)	Raat Aur Din	Hindi	
1968 (16th)	Sharada	Vijaya	Thulabharam	Malayalam	
1969 (17th)	Madhabi Mukherjee	Supriya	Dibratrir Kabya	Bengali	
1970 (18th)	Rehana Sultan	Salma Ahmed	Dastak	Hindi	
1971 (19th)	Waheeda Rehman	Reshma	Reshma Aur Shera	Hindi	
1972 (20th)	Sharada	Sita	Swayamvaram	Malayalam	
1973 (21st)	Nandini Bhaktavatsala	Kamali	Kaadu	Kannada	
1974 (22nd)	Shabana Azmi	Lakshmi	Ankur	Hindi	
1975 (23rd)	Sharmila Tagore	Chanda Thapa, Kajli (Note: Tagore performed dual roles in the film.)	Mausam	Hindi	
1976 (24th)	Lakshmi	Ganga	Sila Nerangalil Sila Manithargal	Tamil	
1977 (25th)	Smita Patil	Urvashi / Usha (Note: Smita played a single character which had two different names.)	Bhumika	Hindi	
1978 (26th)	Sharada	Bharathi	Nimajjanam	Telugu	
1979 (27th)	Shoba	Kuppamma	Pasi	Tamil	
1980 (28th)	Smita Patil	Amma	Chakra	Hindi	
1981 (29th)	Rekha	Amiran (Umrao Jaan) (Note: Rekha played a single character which had two different names.)	Umrao Jaan	Urdu	
1982 (30th)	Shabana Azmi	Pooja Inder Malhotra	Arth	Hindi	
1983 (31st)	Shabana Azmi	Jamini	Khandhar	Hindi	
1984 (32nd)	Shabana Azmi	Rama	Paar	Hindi	
1985 (33rd)	Suhasini	Sindhu	Sindhu Bhairavi	Tamil	
1986 (34th)	Monisha Unni	Gouri	Nakhakshathangal	Malayalam	
1987 (35th)	Archana	Sudha	Veedu	Tamil	
1988 (36th)	Archana	Kamalakshi	Daasi	Telugu	
1989 (37th)	Sreelekha Mukherji	Lakkhi	Parshuramer Kuthar	Bengali	
1990 (38th)	Vijayashanti	Vyjayanthi	Karthavyam	Telugu	
1991 (39th)	Moloya Goswami	Ritu	Firingoti	Assamese	
1992 (40th)	Dimple Kapadia	Shanichari	Rudaali	Hindi	
1993 (41st)	Shobana	Ganga / Nagavalli (Note: Shobana played the role of a woman suffering from multiple personality disorder in the film.)	Manichitrathazhu	Malayalam	
1994 (42nd)	Debashree Roy	Dr. Aditi Sen	Unishe April	Bengali	
1995 (43rd)	Seema Biswas	Phoolan Devi	Bandit Queen	Hindi	
1996 (44th)	Tabu	Virender Kaur	Maachis	Hindi	
1997 (45th) †	Indrani Haldar	Jhinuk	Dahan	Bengali	
1997 (45th) †	Rituparna Sengupta	Romita Chaudhury	Dahan	Bengali	
1998 (46th)	Shabana Azmi	Rambhi (Note: The character played by Shabana Azmi was loosely based on the Porbandar-based lady underworld don Santokben Jadeja.)	Godmother	Hindi	
1999 (47th)	Kirron Kher	Banalata	Bariwali	Bengali	
2000 (48th)	Raveena Tandon	Durga Saikia	Daman: A Victim of Marital Violence	Hindi	
2001 (49th) †	Tabu	Mumtaz Ali Ansari	Chandni Bar	Hindi	
2001 (49th) †	Shobana	Lakshmi	Mitr, My Friend	English	
2002 (50th)	Konkona Sen Sharma	Meenakshi S. Iyer	Mr. and Mrs. Iyer	English	
2003 (51st)	Meera Jasmine	Shahina	Paadam Onnu: Oru Vilapam	Malayalam	
2004 (52nd)	Tara	Hasina	Hasina	Kannada	
2005 (53rd)	Sarika	Shernaz	Parzania	English	
2006 (54th)	Priyamani	Muththazhagu	Paruthiveeran	Tamil	
2007 (55th)	Umashree	Gulabi	Gulabi Talkies	Kannada	
2008 (56th)	Priyanka Chopra	Meghna Mathur	Fashion	Hindi	
2009 (57th)	Ananya Chatterjee	Shikha Sarkar (Srimati Sarkar) (Note: Chatterjee played a single character which had two different names.)	Abohomaan	Bengali	
2010 (58th) †	Mitalee Jagtap Varadkar	Shirmi	Baboo Band Baaja	Marathi	
2010 (58th) †	Saranya Ponvannan	Veerayi	Thenmerku Paruvakaatru	Tamil	
2011 (59th)	Vidya Balan	Reshma (Silk) (Note: Balan played a single character which had two different names.)	The Dirty Picture	Hindi	
2012 (60th)	Usha Jadhav	Yashoda	Dhag	Marathi	
2013 (61st)	Geetanjali Thapa	Kamala	Liar's Dice	Hindi	
2014 (62nd)	Kangana Ranaut	Rani Mehra	Queen	Hindi	
2015 (63rd)	Kangana Ranaut	Tanuja "Tanu" Trivedi, Kusum "Datto" Sangwan (Note: Ranaut performed dual roles in the film.)	Tanu Weds Manu Returns	Hindi	
2016 (64th)	Surabhi Lakshmi	Mother (Note: The character remained unnamed throughout the film.)	Minnaminungu – the Firefly	Malayalam	
2017 (65th)	Sridevi (Note: Sridevi was awarded posthumously.)	Devki Sabarwal	Mom	Hindi	
2018 (66th)	Keerthy Suresh	Savitri (Note: Keerthy Suresh played the role based on the life of Indian actress Savitri in the film.)	Mahanati	Telugu	
2019 (67th) ‡	Kangana Ranaut	Rani Lakshmi Bai	Manikarnika: The Queen of Jhansi	Hindi	
2019 (67th) ‡	Kangana Ranaut	Jaya Nigam	Panga	Hindi	
2020 (68th)	Aparna Balamurali	Sundari "Bommi" Nedumaaran	Soorarai Pottru	Tamil	
2021 (69th) †	Alia Bhatt	Gangubai Kathiawadi	Gangubai Kathiawadi	Hindi	
2021 (69th) †	Kriti Sanon	Mimi Rathore	Mimi	Hindi	
2022 (70th) †	Nithya Menen	Shobana	Thiruchitrambalam	Tamil	
2022 (70th) †	Manasi Parekh	Monghi	Kutch Express	Gujarati	
2023 (71st)	Rani Mukerji	Debika Chatterjee	Mrs. Chatterjee vs Norway	Hindi	
2024 (72nd)	Yami Gautam	Zooni Haksar	Article 370	Hindi	

== See also ==
- List of Indian film actresses
