= Ellindalo Bandavaru =

- DVD cover
- Directed by: P. Lankesh
- Written by: P. Lankesh (dialogues)
- Screenplay by: G. S. Sadashiva; P. Lankesh
- Story by: G. S. Sadashiva; P. Lankesh
- Produced by: Mohan Kumar Kondajji
- Starring: Vimala Naidu; Suresh Heblikar; Lokesh; Meena Kuttappa
- Cinematography: S. R. Bhat
- Edited by: R. R. Reddy
- Music by: Vijaya Bhaskar
- Production company: Manjula Production
- Distributed by: Navashakthi Films Pvt. Ltd.
- Release date: 14 February 1980
- Running time: 109 minutes
- Country: India
- Language: Kannada

Ellindalo Bandavaru is a 1980 Indian Kannada-language film, directed by P. Lankesh and produced by Mohan Kumar Kondajji. The film stars Vimala Naidu, Suresh Heblikar, Lokesh and Meena Kuttappa. The film has musical score by Vijaya Bhaskar. The former Chief Minister of Karnataka Siddaramaiah made an appearance in the film. The film won two Filmfare Awards South.

== Cast ==
- Vimala Naidu
- Suresh Heblikar
- Lokesh
- Meena Kuttappa
- Mala
- Ninduvalli Ananthamurthy
- H. M. Channayya
- L S Sudhindra
- Gururaja Rao
- Dejamma
- A. Kamala
- Master Mahadeva
- Baby Chandrakala
- Duggappa
- H. K. Ramanath
- Nandishwar
- Narasimha
- Siddaramaiah (uncredited)

== Soundtrack ==
The music was composed by Vijaya Bhaskar.

No.	Song	Singers	Lyrics	Length (m:ss)
1	"Ellidde Illeethanka"	S. P. Balasubrahmanyam	P. Lankesh	02:47
2	"Kempadavo Ella Kempadavo"	S. P. Balasubrahmanyam	P. Lankesh	01:35
3	"Kariyouna Guditava"	S. P. Balasubrahmanyam		

== Filmfare Awards South ==
- Best Film - Kannada - Mohan Kumar Kondajji
- Best Actor - Kannada - Lokesh
