= Guruvayur Dorai =

Indian percussionist (1935–2026)

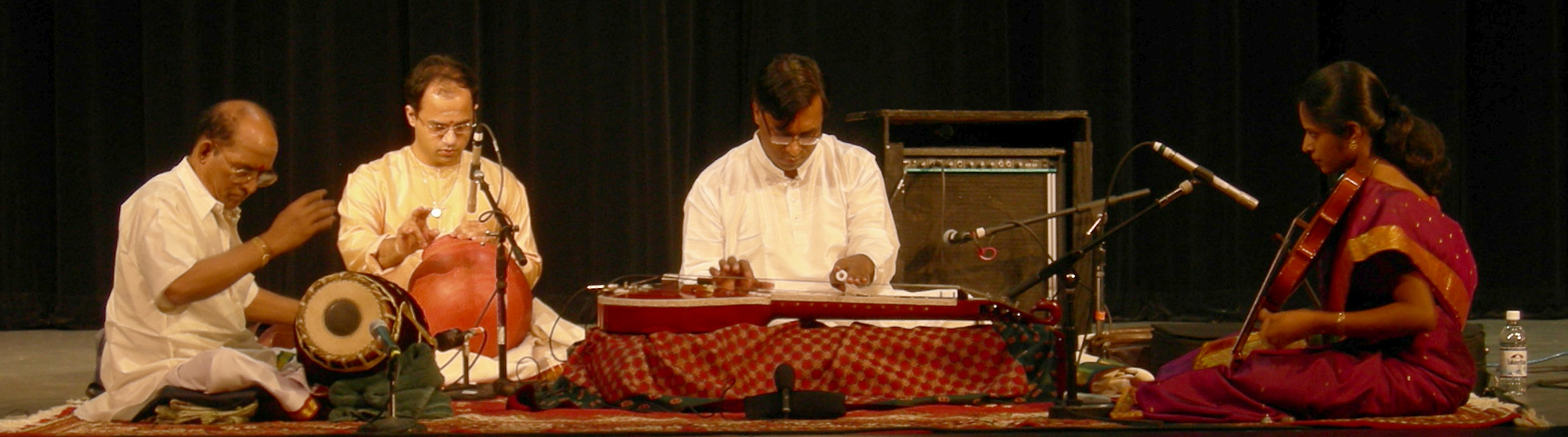
- Guruvayur Dorai (left) accompanying Ravikiran (center) playing the navachitravina, a variant of the chitravina. Also shown are Ravi Balasubramanian, ghatam and Akkarai S. Subhalakshmi, violin.

Background information
- Born: 2 July 1935; Guruvayur, Malabar District, Madras Presidency, British India
- Died: 10 October 2026 (aged 91) Mylapore, Tamil Nadu, India
- Instrument: mridangam

Guruvayur Dorai (2 July 1935 – 10 October 2026) was an Padma Shri ward winning Indian percussionist. At the time of his passing, he was among the most senior exponents of the South Indian classical percussion instrument, the mridangam. He received his initial training under Palghat Subba Iyer and E.P. Narayana Pisharody, and later from Palani Subramaniam Pillai. Initiating his concert performances at the age of eight, Guruvayur Dorai performed on the concert platform for 60 years. His wide range of efforts in the field of mridangam and music have helped propagate the art around the globe.

== Early years ==
An exponent of the Pudukottai style of mridangam, Guruvayur Dorai (his real name being Vaidynathan) was born in the temple town Guruvayur, Malabar District, to G.S. Krishna Iyer and Meenakshi. His father was a priest and mother, a housewife. He had two brothers and three sisters. His sister Guruvayur Ponnammal was a highly reputed singer at the time. His other sister is a reputed music teacher in Chennai, while his brother, G.K. Rajamani, is a notable violinist living in Palghat (Kerala).

Young Dorai had a penchant for percussion and was frequently seen drumming on his body with his fingers even while asleep. Struck by polio at the age of five, his father thought it would be difficult for Dorai to go outside of Guruvayur for higher studies and a job.

There were already a vocalist and a violinist in the family; a mridangist was all that was lacking. So his father decided to sculpt him into one. His father thought Ponnammal, Rajamani and Dorai could give concerts together and that the siblings would take care of Dorai. Moreover, they could make a living out of it.

Dorai began to learn mridangam under the Late Palghat Subba Iyer when he was six. E.P. Narayana Pisharody of Eranallur also taught him at this time. Pisharody's book 'Mridanga Nada Manjari' (a practical study of mridangam) was published by Guruvayur Dorai on 23 September 2001.

The legendary vocalist Chembai Vaidhyanatha Bhagavathar was teaching Ponnammal at that time. Whenever he came to Guruvayur, Chembai used to stay at their house. He took active interest in Dorai's mridangam practice. Dorai had his debut performance (arangetram) at the age of eight, performing with none other than Chembai himself.

1949 was a watershed in Dorai's career, as he came to Chennai for the first time to perform with Chembai in a concert. Meanwhile, Ponnammal got a chance to sing in a Malayalam film. As the opportunities were more copious in Chennai, their father decided to settle there. Dorai, Ponnammal, Rajamani and the father stayed in a rented house in the city while the rest of the family remained in Guruvayur. In the same year, he also happened to meet the legendary mridangam artist Palani Subramaniam Pillai in Thirupoontharai. After Palani Subramaniam Pillai moved to Madras in 1953, Dorai commenced classes with the maestro. This helped him understand and absorb the complexities of the Pudukottai style of mridangam. Dorai stayed with Palani Subramaniam Pillai in his residence for nearly nine years in the gurukulavasam fashion.

== Performances ==
Dorai performed with nearly all the eminent artists even at a young age, including Musiri Subramania Iyer, M. D. Ramanathan, Semmangudi Srinivasa lyer, M. S. Subbulakshmi (it was Dorai who performed with her at Carnegie Hall, New York), G. N. Balasubramaniam, Dwaram Venkataswamy Naidu, Balasubramaniam, M.Balamuralikrishna, S. Balachander, Chitti Babu, T. R. Mahalingam, Mysore T. Chowdiah, Palghat Ghatam Sundaram, Alangudi Ramachandran, G. Harishankar and others.

He also accompanied Sr. Vinjamuri Varadaraja Iyengar on multiple occasions to concerts across Andhra Pradesh. An excerpt from his interview: "He encouraged me very much, kept me with him and let me play for him. Apart from that, I gave a lot of kutcheries in Andhra Pradesh. For all those places, Vinjamuri Varadaraja Iyengar took me with him; like Kakinada, Guntur, Tenali, Vijayawada and to many other places he took me with him and introduced me. Because of his taking me with him, those Sabhas/ people got acquainted with me and got to know me". Read More About the Interview

Moreover, he was one of the few mridangists who had performed with nagaswaram wizards, namely T. N. Rajarathnam Pillai (in 1956, Rama Seva Mandali, Bangalore; P. Bhuvaneswariah played violin, Bangalore Venkatram played ghatam, and a khanjira artist was part of the team), Thiruvengadu Subramanium Pillai in 1951, and Namagiripettai Krishnan (from the 1960s onwards). He also performed with leading present-day artists including K.J. Yesudas, T. N. Krishnan, T. V. Sankaranarayanan, T. N. Seshagopalan, Neyveli Santhanagopalan, Chitraveena N. Ravikiran Flautist Shashank Subramanyam and others.

== Death ==
Dorai died in Mylapore on 10 October 2026, at the age of 91.

== Awards ==
- 1990 : Received title of Kalaimamani Award by the Government of Tamil Nadu, which is the highest state honour in the field of Arts.
- 1996 : Awarded Sangeet Natak Akademi Award in the field of Music for his contribution to carnatic Vocal Music.
- 2003 : Awarded Sangeetha Kalasikhamani by The Indian Fine arts Society, Chennai.
- 2011 : Sepcial Award Sangeet Natak Akademi Tagore Ratna by Sangeet Natak Akademi.
- 2025 : Honoured with the Padma Shri, India's fourth-highest civilian award, by the Government of India.
