= Vinu Chakravarthy =

Tamil actor, script writer and director

- Born: 15 December 1945; Usilampatti, Madras Presidency; Madurai District, British India
- Died: 27 April 2017 (aged 71); Chennai, Tamil Nadu, India
- Occupations: Actor, screenwriter and director
- Years active: 1977–2017
- Spouse: Karnapoo Vinuchakravarthy
- Children: 2

Vinu Chakravarthy (15 December 1945 – 27 April 2017) was an Indian actor, screenwriter and director who is known for acting in more than 1000 movies predominantly in Tamil films mostly as a comedian, supporting actor or in a villainous role. The 2007 Tamil movie Muni was his 1000th film.

== Early life and education ==
Chakravarthy was born on 15 December 1945, in Usilampatti to Adimoola Thevar and Manjuvani Ammal. He studied at Wesley School, Royapettah and graduated in commerce from A. M. Jain College. He was the eldest son among other 3 sons and a daughter.

== Career ==
On completion of his education, Chakravarthy worked as a Reserve Sub-Inspector at the Ice House police station for six months before joining the Southern Railways where he worked for four years. Out of passion for acting, he joined a drama troupe and started acting in plays and wrote scripts too.

Chakravarthy was working as a script writer for Kannada director Puttanna Kanagal when he was noticed by film producer Tiruppur Mani who, in 1977, gave him a role in the Kannada film Parasangada Gendethimma which was later remade into Tamil as Rosappu Ravikkaikari (1979) with Chakravarthy returning. Since then, Chakravarthy has starred in over 1,000 films in four South Indian languages including 900 in Tamil, 30 in Malayalam. He also directed movies on his own and is credited with introducing Silk Smitha.

== Partial filmography ==
=== Actor ===
==== Tamil ====
1. Rosappu Ravikkaikari (1979)
2. Vandichakkaram (1980)
3. Gopurangal Saivathillai (1982)
4. Manaivi Solle Manthiram (1983)
5. Mann Vasanai (1983)
6. Thambikku Entha Ooru (1984)
7. January 1 (1984)
8. Oru Kaidhiyin Diary (1985) as S. P. Viswanathan
9. Karimedu Karuvayan (1986)
10. Amman Kovil Kizhakale (1986)
11. Enakku Nane Needipathi (1986)
12. Velicham (1987)
13. Ini Oru Sudhanthiram (1987)
14. Manithan (1987)
15. Guru Sishyan (1988)
16. Rayilukku Neramachu (1988)
17. Enne Petha Raasa (1989)
18. Rajadhi Raja (1989)
19. Siva (1989)
20. Kai Veesamma Kai Veesu (1989)
21. Manidhan Marivittan (1989)
22. Thangamana Raasa (1989)
23. Dharma Devan (1989)
24. Dravidan (1989)
25. Mappillai (1989)
26. Manasukketha Maharasa (1989)
27. Panakkaran (1990)
28. Vaazhkai Chakkaram (1990)
29. Athisaya Piravi (1990)
30. Sathya Vaakku (1990)
31. Perum Pulli (1991)
32. Vetri Karangal (1991)
33. Marikozhundhu (1991)
34. Thambikku Oru Pattu (1991)
35. Unna Nenachen Pattu Padichen (1992)
36. Annaamalai (1992)
37. Naalaiya Theerpu (1992)
38. Maharasan (1993)
39. Sinna Mapplai (1993)
40. Moondravadhu Kann (1993)
41. Rasa Magan (1994)
42. Veera (1994)
43. Varavu Ettana Selavu Pathana (1994)
44. Pondattiye Deivam (1994)
45. Nattamai (1994)
46. Lucky Man (1995)
47. Manathile Oru Paattu (1995)
48. Thottil Kuzhandhai (1995)
49. Valli Vara Pora (1995)
50. Thirumbi Paar (1996)
51. Coimbatore Mappillai (1996)
52. Kaalam Maari Pochu (1996)
53. Sundara Purushan (1996)
54. Mappillai Gounder (1997)
55. Arunachalam (1997)
56. Periya Manushan (1997)
57. Bhagavath Singh (1998)
58. Ninaithen Vandhai (1998)
59. Dharma (1998)
60. Nilaave Vaa (1998)
61. Veeram Vilanja Mannu (1998)
62. Kumbakonam Gopalu (1998)
63. Kannathal (1998)
64. Sivappu Nila (1998)
65. Unakkaga Ellam Unakkaga (1999)
66. Poo Maname Vaa (1999)
67. Unnai Thedi (1999)
68. Poo Vaasam (1999)
69. Amarkkalam (1999)
70. Good Luck (2000)
71. Parthen Rasithen (2000)
72. Kannaal Pesavaa (2000)
73. Anbudan (2000)
74. Sri Raja Rajeshwari (2001)
75. Kunguma Pottu Gounder (2001)
76. Citizen (2001)
77. Lovely (2001)
78. Pandavar Bhoomi (2001)
79. Alli Arjuna (2002)
80. Thamizhan (2002)
81. Gemini (2002)
82. Thenkasi Pattanam (2002)
83. Sundhara Travels (2002)
84. Chokka Thangam (2003)
85. Student Number 1 (2003)
86. Banda Paramasivam (2003)
87. Anjaneya (2003)
88. Anbe Un Vasam (2003)
89. Image (2004)
90. Arul (2004)
91. Jana as MLA
92. Vayasu Pasanga (2004)
93. Settai (2004)
94. Giri (2004)
95. Ilakkanam (2006)
96. Manase Mounama (2007)
97. Muni (2007)
98. Tharagu (2008)
99. Pollachi Mappillai (2010)
100. Desingu Raja (2013)
101. Vaayai Moodi Pesavum (2014)

==== Malayalam ====
1. Sangham (1988)
2. Kauravar (1992) as Police Inspector
3. Maanyanmar (1992) as Police Inspector
4. Meleparambil Aanveedu (1993) as Veeramuthu Goundar
5. Kambolam (1994) as Murukarajan Goundar
6. Rajadhani (1994) as Rajamanikyam Nadar
7. Rudraksham (1994) as CI Rao
8. Maanikyachempazhukka (1995)
9. Kidilol Kidilam (1995)
10. Lelam (1997) as Andipatti Thevar
11. Nadan Pennum Nattupramaniyum (2000) as Perumal
12. Thenkasipattanam (2001)
13. Achane Aanenikkishtam (2002)
14. Sthithi (2003)
15. Masanagudi Mannadiyar Speaking (2004)
16. Samsaaram Aarogyathinu Haanikaram (2014)

==== Other languages ====
1. Parasangada Gendethimma (1978; Kannada) (uncredited)
2. Angarakshakudu (1994; Telugu)
3. Ratra Yatra (1997; Telugu)

==== Television ====
- Balachander in Chinnathirai – Manjal Nila (Raj TV)
- Agni Pravesam (Jaya TV)
- Megala (Sun TV)

=== Writer ===
- Vandichakkaram (1980)
- Koyil Puraa (1981)
- Ponnuketha Purushan (1992)

== Controversies ==
Chakravarthy criticised television and film producer Ekta Kapoor for her depiction of Silk Smitha in The Dirty Picture, a biographical film on the actress. He also expressed displeasure over Kapoor's choice of casting. He also said Smitha had wide expressive, inviting eyes, which Vidya Balan does not have.
