= Devara Makkalu =

- Directed by: Y. R. Swamy
- Screenplay by: Y. R. Swamy
- Story by: Ma. Na. Murthy
- Based on: Meena by Ma. Na. Murthy
- Produced by: G. N. Lakshmipathy
- Starring: Rajkumar; Jayanthi; Kalpana; Rajesh
- Cinematography: N. G. Rao
- Edited by: P. Bhaktavatsalam
- Music by: G. K. Venkatesh
- Production company: Bharath Enterprises
- Release date: 1970
- Running time: 160 minutes
- Country: India
- Language: Kannada

Devara Makkalu ( transl. God's Children) is a 1970 Indian Kannada language drama film directed by Y. R. Swamy based on the novel Meena by Ma. Na. Murthy. It stars Rajkumar along with Jayanthi, Kalpana and Rajesh in other lead roles. The film features a soundtrack from G. K. Venkatesh and is produced by Bharath Enterprises.

== Cast ==
- Rajkumar as Ranga
- Jayanthi as Gowri
- Kalpana as Kanaka
- Rajesh as Babu
- Narasimharaju
- Indira Devi
- Sampath as Krishnaswamy, a doctor
- M. Jayashree as Rukmini, Krishnaswamy's wife
- M. P. Shankar
- Sriram

== Soundtrack ==
The music of the film was composed by G. K. Venkatesh and lyrics for the soundtrack written by Chi. Udaya Shankar.

=== Track list ===
#	Title	Singer(s)
1	"Devara Makkalu Navella"	S. Janaki
2	"Ee Dina Maja"	P. B. Sreenivas
3	"Bekenu Samaanu Nodu"	P. Susheela
4	"Haadi Hoovu"	P. B. Sreenivas, S. Janaki
