= M. K. Saroja =

Indian classical dancer (1931–2022)

Madras Kadiravelu Saroja
- Born: Madras Kadiravelu Saroja; 7 April 1931; Chennai, Tamil Nadu, British India
- Died: 13 June 2022 (aged 91); Chennai, Tamil Nadu, India
- Occupation: Dancer
- Spouse: Mohan Khokar
- Children: 4
- Awards: Padma Shri; Sangeet Natak Akademi Award; Kalaimamani Award; Life Time Achievement Award; E. Krishna Iyer Medal; Natya Kalanidhi; Tagore Akademi Ratna Award

Madras Kadiravelu Saroja (7 April 1931 – 13 June 2022) was an exponent and teacher of the Indian classical dance form of Bharatanatyam. The Government of India honored her, in 2011, with the Padma Shri, the country's fourth highest civilian award, for her services in the field of art and culture.

== Biography ==
Bharata Natyam (Tamil: பரதநாட்டியம்) also spelled Bharatanatyam, is a classical Indian dance form that originated in the temples of Tamil Nadu. Today, it is one of the most popular and widely performed dance styles and is practiced by male and female dancers all over the world.

"She is a saintly person, never given to publicity and hype", says noted classical dancer, Padma Subrahmanyam

M. K. Saroja was born on 7 April 1931 at Chennai (erstwhile Madras), in the Indian state of Tamil Nadu. She started learning classical dance when she was five years old, along with her sister, under the tutelage of Muthukumaran Pillai, a known classical dance teacher and reportedly, the first dance teacher at Rukmini Devi Arundale's Kalakshetra, who taught many renowned classical dancers such as Mrinalini Sarabhai and Kamala Laxman. The young Saroja followed the master when he moved to Bangalore to join the Bangalore Studio, in Bangalore.

Saroja made her debut in 1940 and soon became a known dancer. In 1946, she was offered a movie contract by Gemini Studios, in Chennai which she turned down. Three years later, in December 1949, she married Mohan Khokar, renowned art historian and dance scholar and a co-student at Kalakshetra and followed her husband to Baroda when he was posted there as the Head of Department of Dance, Maharaja Sayajirao University. In Baroda, Saroja learnt Kathak from Sundarlal and Kundanlal Gangani, noted Kathak gurus.

In 1961, Mohan Khokar was posted as the Special Officer for dance at the Sangeet Natak Akademi and the couple moved to New Delhi. There, she resumed teaching and continued with dance performances and had the opportunity to perform at the Rashtrapati Bhavan, in front of the visiting Saudi Arabian ruler. From 1970 onwards, she started visiting the Centre Mandapa in Paris, for teaching students there which she continued until the year 2000.

M. K. Saroja retired from professional dance, after 40 active years, in 2000, following the death of her husband. She had four sons of which the third son, Ashish Mohan Khokar is a known art historian, author and dance critic. She currently lives in Chennai.

M. K. Saroja died on 13 June 2022, at the age of 91.

== Legacy ==
"M. K. Saroja's art is that of the devotee. She has absolute 'bhakti' residing in her...", opines Leela Samson, Director of Kalakshetra

M. K. Saroja tutored students such as Nargis Katpitia, Pratibha Pandit, Sudha Patel, Laxmi Valrani, Indrani Rehman, Yamini Krishnamurthy, Romana Agnel, Shobana Radhakrishna, Rasika Khanna, Arup Ghosh, Lucia Maloney, Milena Salvini and Vidya. The last two dancers still teach at the Centre Mandapa, Paris.

Two documentary films have been made on M. K. Saroja, one by the Department of Theatre, University of Rome and another one by Claude Lamorrise.

== Awards and recognitions ==
- Padma Shri - Government of India - 2011
- Sangeet Natak Akademi Tagore Ratna - 2011
- Sangeet Natak Akademi Award - 1995
- Kalaimamani Award - Tamil Nadu State Eyal Isai Nataka Manram
- Natya Kalanidhi - Association of Bharatanatyam Artistes of India - 2007
- Life Time Achievement Award -
- E. Krishna Iyer Medal - Sruthi Foundation - 2000

== See also ==
- Kalakshetra
- Rukmini Devi Arundale
- Yamini Krishnamurthy
- Indrani Rehman
