= Tagore Ratna and Tagore Puraskar =

Sangeet Natak Akademi Tagore Ratna & Tagore Puruskar
- Award for contributions to Performing arts
- Awarded for: Award for performing arts in India
- Sponsored by: Sangeet Natak Akademi
- First award: 2011 (One Time)
- Website: sangeetnatak.gov.in

Sangeet Natak Akademi Tagore Ratna and Sangeet Natak Akademi Tagore Puraskar were performing arts awards given at special events organised by Sangeet Natak Akademi in

- Kolkata – Sangeet Natak Akademi Tagore Samman on 25 April 2012
- Chennai – Sangeet Natak Akademi Tagore Samman on 2 May 2012.

Sangeet Natak Akademi Tagore Ratna is equivalent to Sangeet Natak Akademi Fellowship and Sangeet Natak Akademi Tagore Puruskar is equivalent to Sangeet Natak Akademi Award. These were one-time awards conferred on the occasion to commemorate the 150 birth anniversary of Rabindranath Tagore.

== Sangeet Natak Akademi Tagore Ratna Recipients ==
=== Music ===
- Laxman Krishnarao Pandit
- Zia Fariduddin Dagar
- Ghulam Mustafa Khan
- Prabha Atre
- Vanraj Bhatia
- Abdul Halim Jaffer Khan
- Ram Narayan
- Sabri Khan
- Buddhadev Das Gupta
- Nedunuri Krishna Murthy
- Sripada Pinakapani
- R. K. Sreekanthan
- M.S. Gopalakrishnan
- Natesan Ramani
- Vellore G. Ramabhadran
- Guruvayur Dorai
- Kartar Singh

=== Dance ===
- Vyjayantimala Bali
- Kalanidhi Narayanan
- M. K. Saroja
- Kumudini Lakhia
- Mayadhar Raut
- Mankompu Sivasankara Pillai
- Pasumarthy Venugapala Krishna Sarma
- Maya Rao
- Amala Shankar
- P.K. Narayanan Nambiar

=== Theatre ===
- Mohit Chattopadhyaya
- Satyadev Dubey
- Vijaya Mehta
- Rajinder Nath
- Rudraprasad Sengupta
- Alyque Padamsee
- Soumitra Chatterjee
- R. Nagarathnamma
- V. Ramamurthy

=== Traditional/Folk/Tribal/Dance/Music/Theatre and Puppetry ===
- Satguru Jagjit Singh Namdhari
- Gurcharan Singh Ragi
- Kartar Singh
- Yamunabai Waikar
- Lalit Chandra Ojha
- Arghya Sen
- G Gourakishore Sharma
- T. R. Kamala Murthy
- Birendranath Datta
- Sonam Tshering Lepcha

=== Overall Contribution/Scholarship ===
- B. Rajanikanta Rao
- Laxmi Narayan Garg
- B. N. Goswamy
- M. Nagabhushana Sarma
- P. V. Krishnamurthy

== Sangeet Natak Akademi Tagore Puruskar recipients ==
=== Music ===
- Shankar Lal Mishra - Hindustani
- Sunanda Patnaik - Hindustani
- Ganesh Prasad Sharma - Hindustani
- Amiya Ranjan Banerjee - Hindustani
- Shrikrishna Savlaram Haldankar - Hindustani
- Faiyaz Khan - Hindustani Instrumental
- Tanjavur Sankara Iyer - Carnatic
- R Visweswaran - Carnatic Instrumental
- Mayavaram Saraswathi - Carnatic Instrumental
- KumarPillai Velukutty Nair - Carnatic Instrumental
- K. Chellaiah - Carnatic Instrumental
- S.R.G. Rajanna - Carnatic Instrumental
- Karam Chaoba Singh - Other Major Traditions of Music

=== Dance ===
- S. Swaminathan - Bharatnatyam
- N.S. Jayalakshmi - Bharatnatyam
- Rajee Narayan - Bharatnatyam
- Chemencerri Kuniraman Nair - Kathakali
- Nattuvan Paramasiva Menon - Kathakali
- Devjani Chaliha - Manipuri
- Bhagavatula Yagna Narayan Sarma - Kuchipudi
- Ritha Devi Mukhopadhyaya - Odissi
- Haricharan Saikia - Sattriya
- Patraayani Sangeetha Rao - Music for Dance
- Bhagavatula Seetarama Sarma - Music for Dance

=== Theatre ===
- Bijoy Kumar Mishra
- K. M. Raghavan Nambiar
- Madhukar Toradmal
- Jalabala Vaidya & Gopal Sharman (Joint Award)
- Prasad Sawkar
- Chatla Sreeramulu
- Sushma Seth
- Jayamala Jayaram Shiledar

=== Traditional/Folk/Tribal/Dance/Music/Theatre and Puppetry ===
- Ali Mohamad Bhagat
- Zahoor Mir
- Sumitra Sen
- Mahipatray Kavi
- Hira Lal Yadav
- Abungbam Kabui
- Bishwa Bandhu
- Ramsahaya Pandey
- Radha Krishna Kadam
- Gambhari Devi
- Sademmeren Longkumer
- Anusuya Devi
- Gopiram Borgayan

=== Overall Contribution/Scholarship ===
- M. L. Varadpande
- B M Sundaram
- Ramchandra Chintaman Dhere
- Raja Mrigendra SIngh
- Nilamadhab Panigrahi
