= Lokesh =

Indian (Kannada-cinema) actor (1947-2004)

- Born: Madapura Subbaiah Naidu Lokanatha Naidu; 19 May 1947; Bangalore, Kingdom of Mysore, British India
- Died: 14 October 2004 (aged 57); Bangalore, Karnataka, India
- Occupations: Actor, Director and producer
- Spouse: Girija
- Children: Srujan Lokesh (Son); Pooja Lokesh (Shilpa) (Daughter)
- Parent(s): Subbaiah Naidu (father), Venkatamma (mother)

Lokesh (Kannada pronunciation: [loːkeːʃ]; 19 May 1947 – 14 October 2004) was an Indian actor who appeared in Kannada cinema.

== Career ==
Lokesh made his film debut in the 1958 film Bhakta Prahlada. He had thrice won the Karnataka State Film Award for Best Actor during his career, for Bhootayyana Maga Ayyu (1974), for Parasangada Gendethimma (1978) and for Banker Margayya (1984).

== Filmography ==
=== Films ===
- All films are in Kannada unless otherwise noted.

List of film credits
Year	Title	Role	Notes	Ref.
1958	Bhakta Prahlada	Prahlada		
1968	Adda Dari			
1974	Kaadu	Shivaganga		
1974	Bhootayyana Maga Ayyu	Ayyu		
1975	Ninagagi Nanu			
1975	Devara Kannu	Dr. Ramesh		
1975	Ellorum Nallavare		Tamil film	
1975	Andaroo Manchivare	Seshu	Telugu film	
1976	Ek Gaon Ki Kahani	Gangaram	Hindi film	
1976	Punardattha	Lakshmana		
1976	Parivarthane			
1977	Kakana Kote	Kaka Nayaka		
1978	Vamsha Jyothi	Sharada's boss		
1978	Nanna Prayaschittha	Ramkumar		
1978	Suli			
1978	Parasangada Gendethimma	Gendethimma		
1979	Adalu Badalu	Inspector Murali		
1979	Bhoolokadalli Yamaraja			
1979	Muyyi			
1979	Kamala			
1979	Daaha			
1979	Chandanada Gombe	Chinobha		
1979	Mallige Sampige			
1979	Manini			
1980	Bhaktha Siriyala			
1980	Haddina Kannu	Rudra		
1980	Hunnimeya Rathriyalli			
1980	Ellindalo Bandavaru			
1980	Jari Bidda Jana			
1980	Pattanakke Banda Pathniyaru			
1980	Nari Swargakke Dari			
1981	Sangeetha			
1981	Yava Hoovu Yara Mudigo			
1981	Avali Javali			
1981	Bhoomige Banda Bhagavantha	Ranga		
1981	Yedeyuru Siddalingeshwara			
1981	Rudri			
1982	Archana			
1982	Adrushtavantha			
1982	Jimmy Gallu	Ganesha		
1982	Betthale Seve	Thippga		
1983	Devara Theerpu			
1983	Banker Margayya	Margayya		
1983	Ibbani Karagithu	Raghu		
1983	Karune Illada Kanoonu			
1984	Onti Dhwani			
1984	Hennina Sowbhagya	Anand Rao		
1984	Mooru Janma			
1985	Shwetha Gulabi	Govardhan		
1985	Savira Sullu	Na. Ra. Da. Naidu		
1985	Mavano Aliyano			
1985	Shiva Kotta Sowbhagya			
1986	Lancha Lancha Lancha			
1987	Premaloka	Ravi's father		
1987	Sangrama			
1987	Thayi Kotta Thali			
1987	Surya			
1988	Ranadheera	IGP Jagannath		
1989	Madhuri			
1989	Sankranthi			
1989	Kindari Jogi	Doddmane Rudrappa		
1990	Aasegobba Meesegobba	Bhavanishankar		
1990	Anukoolakkobba Ganda			
1991	Bhujangayyana Dashavathara	Bhujangayya		
1991	Ramachaari			
1991	Veerappan	Nayakan		
1991	Hosamane Aliya			
1992	Chaitrada Premanjali	Seenappa		
1992	Ksheera Sagara			
1992	Gopi Krishna	Kothi Kodanda		
1992	Guru Brahma			
1992	Baa Nanna Preethisu			
1992	Bharjari Gandu			
1992	Mavanige Takka Aliya			
1993	Angaili Apsare			
1993	Gundana Maduve			
1993	Alimayya			
1993	Shrungara Raja			
1993	Bevu Bella			
1994	Chinna Nee Naguthiru			
1994	Lockup Death	Asha's Father		
1994	Yarigu Helbedi	Rama Rao		
1994	Mahashakthi Maye			
1994	Poorna Sathya			
1994	Panjarada Gili			
1995	Putnanja	Roja's Father		
1995	Mojugara Sogasugara	Bhoopathi Rao		
1995	Madhura Maithri			
1995	Sangeetha Sagara Ganayogi Panchakshara Gavai	Panchakshara Gawai		
1995	Putmalli			
1996	Karpoorada Gombe			
1996	Shiva Leele			
1996	Sthree			
1997	Ee Hrudaya Ninagagi			
1997	Mavana Magalu			
1997	Kodagina Kaveri			
1997	Halliyadarenu Shiva			
1997	Bhoomigeetha	Lingaiah		
1997	Mungarina Minchu	Indu's Grandfather		
1997	Prema Raga Haadu Gelathi			
1998	Kurubana Rani			
1998	Mr. Puttaswamy			
1998	Bhoomi Thayiya Chochchala Maga	Kallanna		
1998	Preethsod Thappa	Sathya		
1998	Thayiya Runa			
1999	Coolie Raja			
1999	Patela			
2000	Krishnarjuna			
2001	Gatti Mela			
2001	Nanna Preethiya Hudugi	"Maduve" Manjaiah		
2001	Rusthum			
2002	Boothayyana Makkalu			
2002	Ninne Preethisuve		Guest appearance	
2002	Punjabi House			
2003	Nanjundi			
2003	Shravana Sambhrama			

== Awards ==
=== Karnataka State Film Awards ===
- 1973–74: Best Actor – Bhootayyana Maga Ayyu
- 1978–79: Best Actor – Parasangada Gendethimma
- 1983–84: Best Actor – Banker Margayya

=== Filmfare Awards South ===
- 1974: Best Actor – Kannada – Bhootayyana Maga Ayyu
- 1980: Best Actor – Kannada – Ellindalo Bandavaru
- 1991: Best Director – Kannada – Bhujangayyana Dashavathara

=== Aryabhata Film Awards ===
- 1997: Best Supporting actor – Mungarina Minchu
