= Kadavina Hosahalli =

Village in Hassan district of Karnataka, India

Coordinates: 12.793°N 76.260°E

Kadavinahosahalli is a village in Hassan district of Karnataka state, India.

== Location ==
Kadavina-Hosahalli village is located on the village road between Kushalnagar and Hassan.

== Postal Code ==
The village has a post office and the PIN code is 573130.

== Image gallery ==
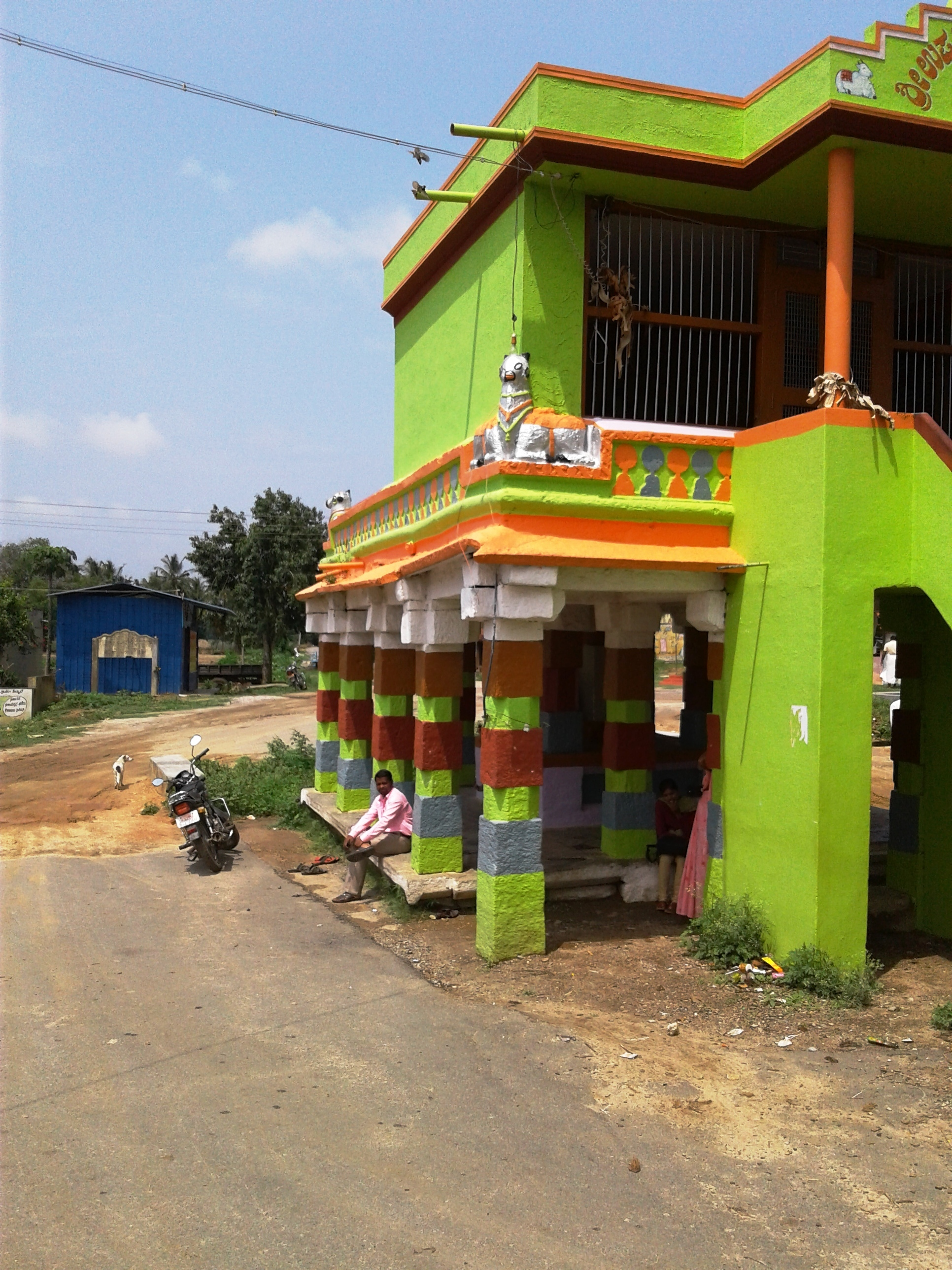
Hebbale

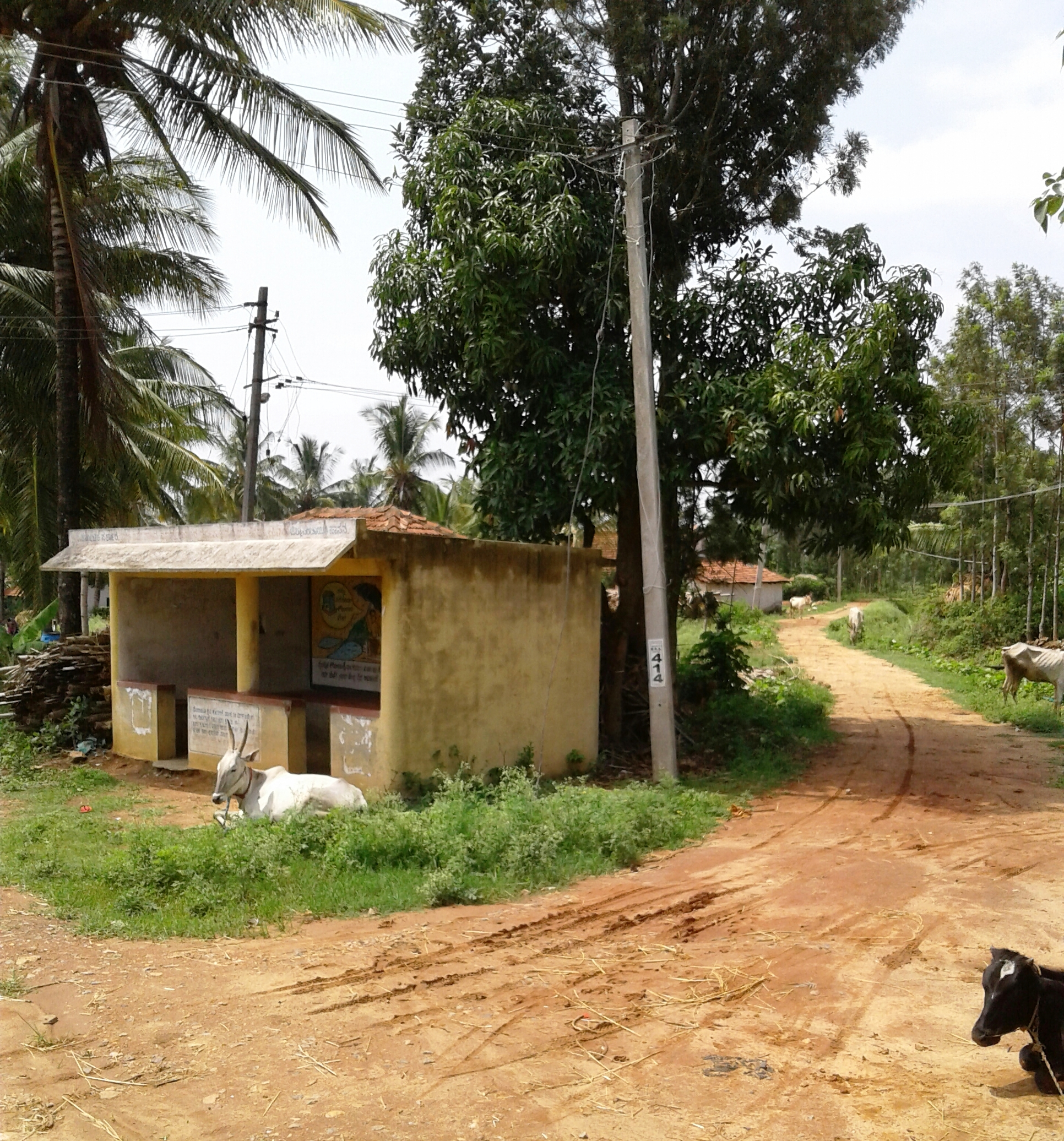
Bolakyathanahalli

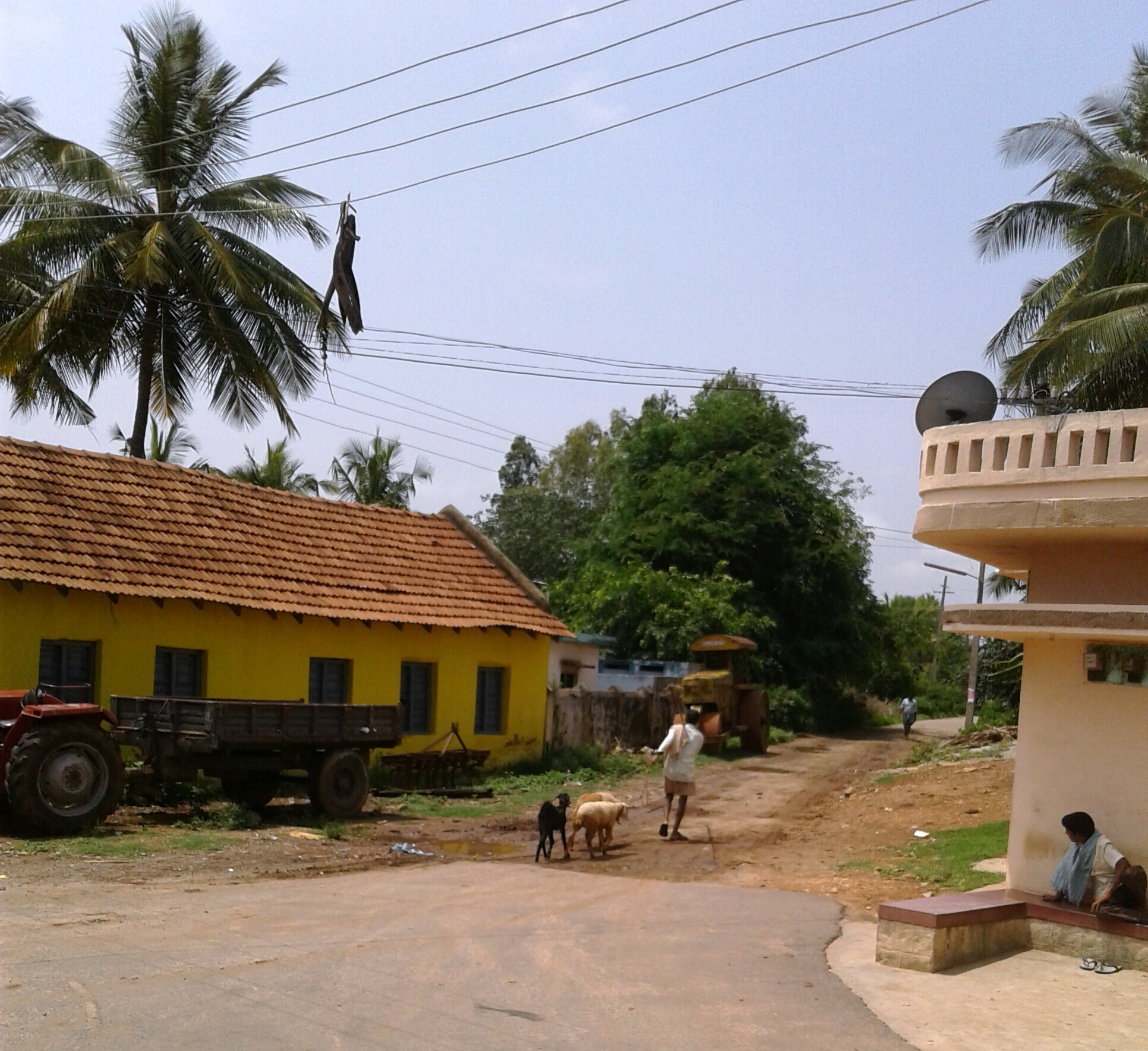
ganjalagodu

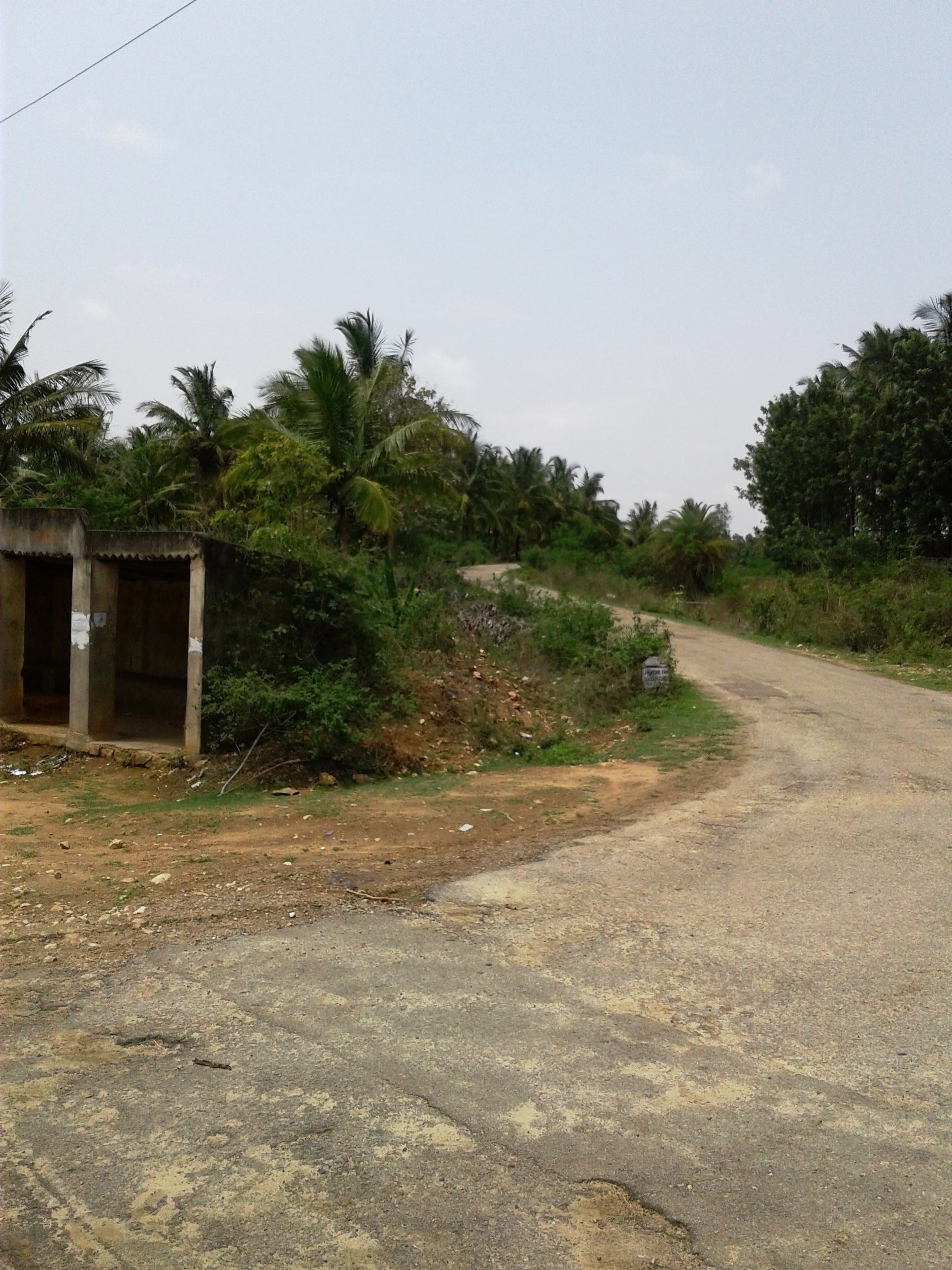
Basavanahalli

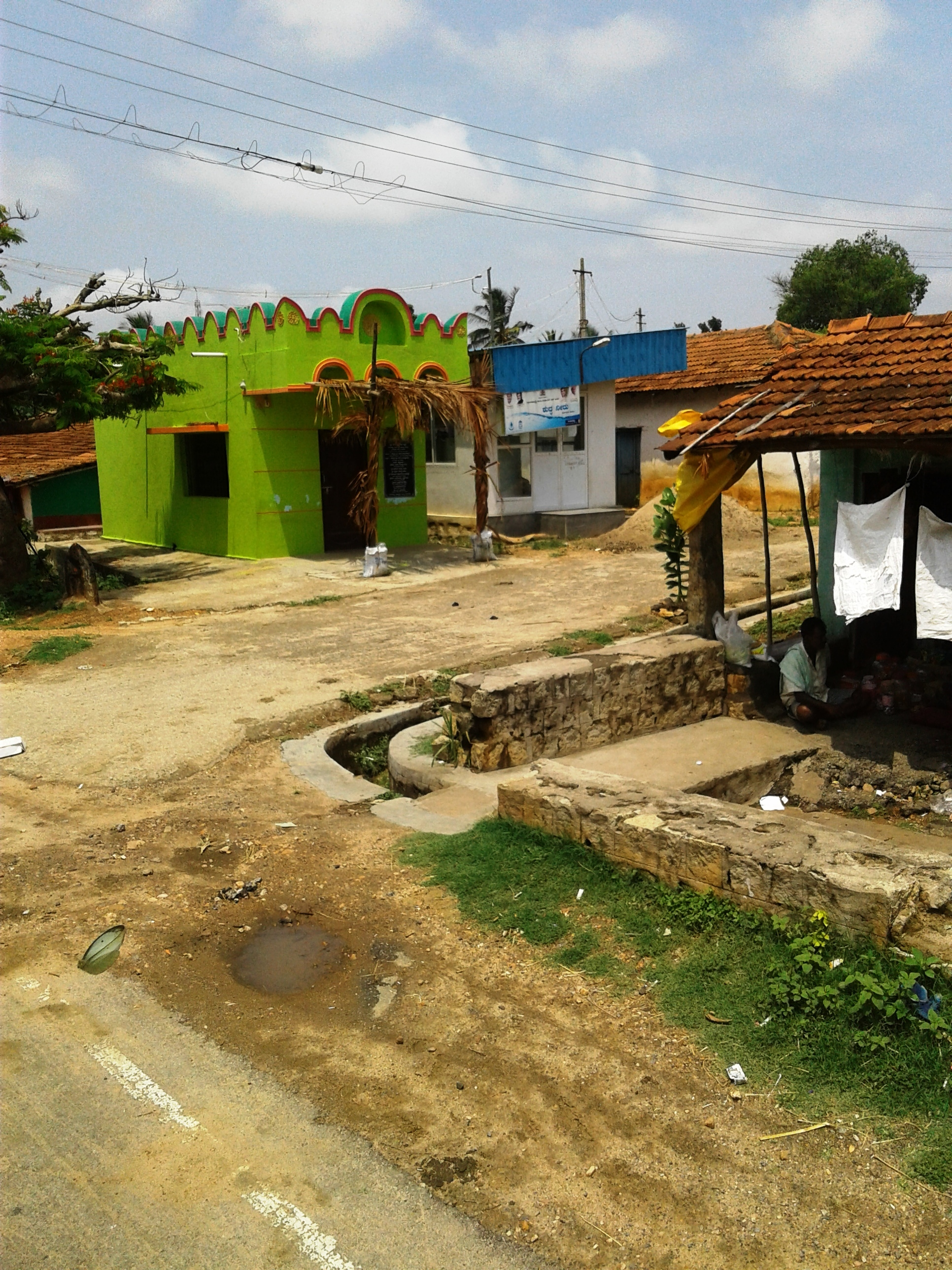
Shivapura

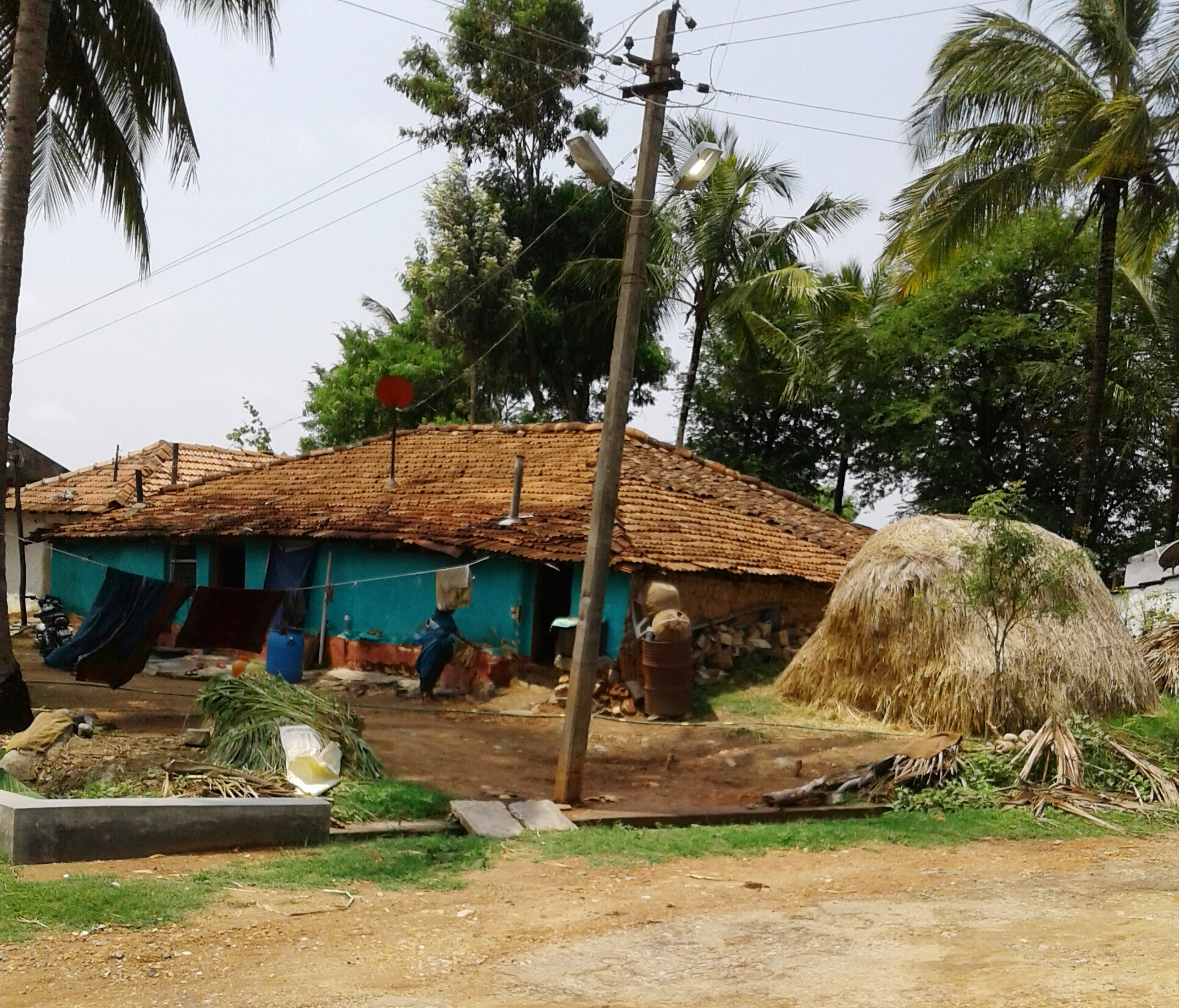
Honnagowanhalli

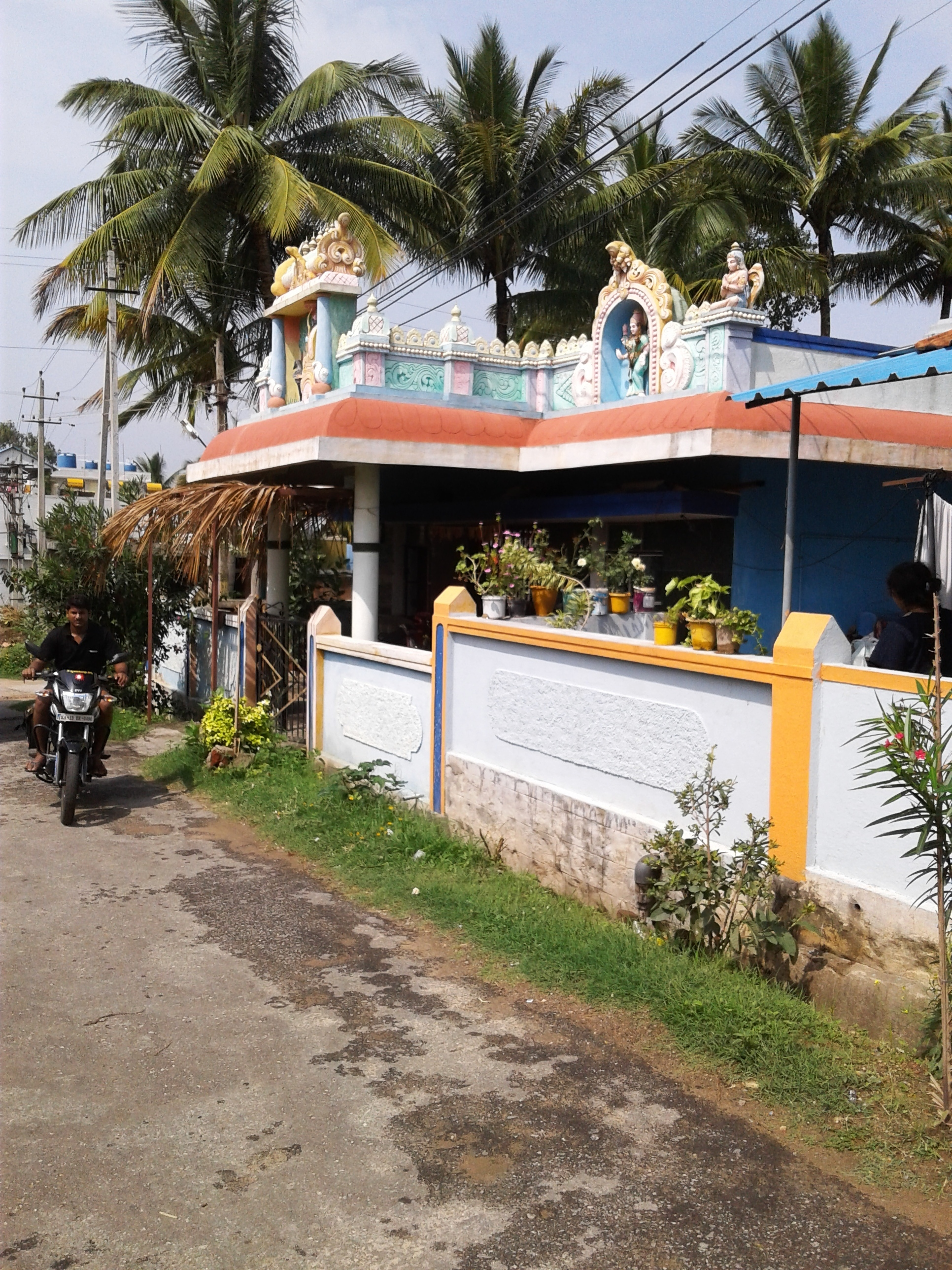
Shaneshwara

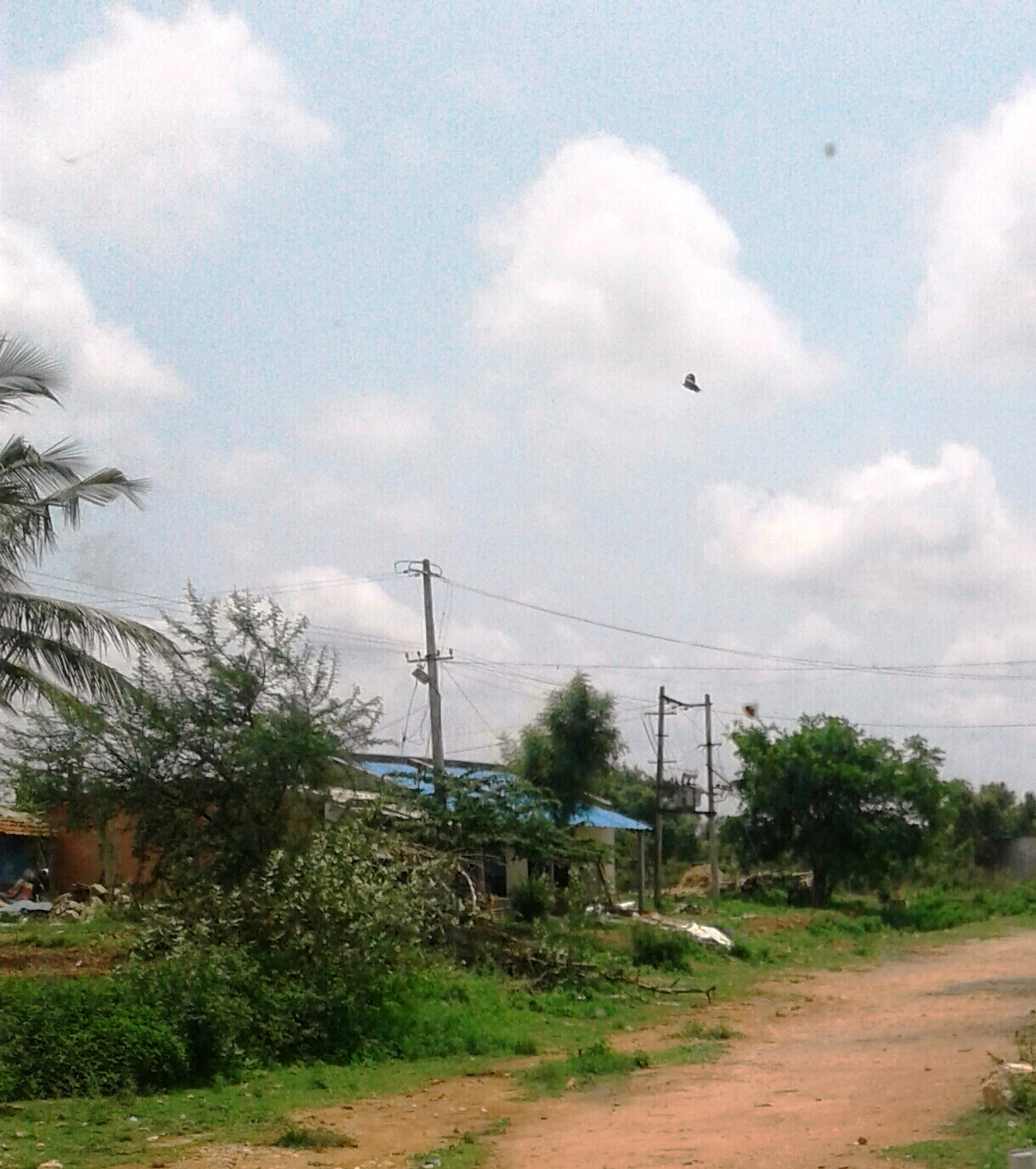

== See also ==
- Athini
- Gorur
- Holenarasipura
- Hassan
