= Kaadu (1973 Kannada film) =

- Directed by: Girish Karnad
- Written by: Srikrishna Alanahalli
- Screenplay by: Girish Karnad
- Based on: Kaadu (1972) by Srikrishna Alanahalli
- Produced by: G. N. Lakshmipathy; K.N. Narayan
- Starring: Master G. S. Nataraj; Amrish Puri; Nandini Bhaktavatsala
- Cinematography: Govind Nihalani
- Edited by: P. Bhaktavalsalam
- Music by: B. V. Karanth
- Production company: L. N. Combines
- Release date: 1973
- Running time: 141 minutes
- Country: India
- Language: Kannada

Kaadu ( transl. Forest) is a 1973 Indian Kannada-language film written and directed by Girish Karnad. The screenplay was based on a novel of the same name by Srikrishna Alanahalli. It stars Master G. S. Nataraj, Amrish Puri and Nandini Bhaktavatsala. The film won awards at the 21st National Film Awards and the 21st Filmfare Awards South.

Kamal Haasan called it one of his favourite films and said this film served as inspiration for his film Thevar Magan (1992).

== Plot ==
Kitti, an eight-year-old boy, is brought from a city to a village called Koppal by his uncle, Chandre Gowda. Gowda is married to Kamali and the couple are childless. Kitti develops a deep attachment to Kamali and the thick forests in Koppal. Gowda is a frequent visitor to a nearby village called Hosur, where he has a mistress, Basakka. Kamali is aware of her husband's extra marital relationship, but remains helpless. On one evening, Kamali takes Kitti and a servant along with her to the forest. They meet a witch who performs a sacrifice which is meant to keep Gowda away from Basakka. He assures Kamali that she will get back her husband from the fold of Basakka. Kitti gets to know about his uncle's extramarital affair. The fight between two individuals turns into a feud between the two villages Koppalu and Hosuru. Kamali is convinced that the effect of the witchcraft is beginning to take place. Meanwhile, Gowda gets a message from Basakka, asking him not to come to Hosur as his life might be under danger. Gowda thinks that his pride is hurt, and to prove his courage he sends her a message that he will come the following night. A distressed Kamali makes a second attempt to keep her husband at home. She decides to go to the witch but is fatally attacked by Hosur Shivaganga's men on the way. This leads to the villagers of Koppal launch a massive attack on their Hosur counterparts. In the fight that ensues, Shivaganga gets killed by Gowda's servants. The police come to the village and arrest Chandre Gowda and other criminals and sets up an outpost near the villages, and ask the villagers to pay fine for its maintenance. This also ensures that the villagers are refrained from conducting the Nyaya.

== Cast ==
- Master G. S. Nataraj as Kitti
- Amrish Puri as Chandre Gowda, Kitti's uncle
- Nandini Bhaktavatsala as Kamali, Gowda's wife
- Sundar Raj as Kencha
- Lokesh as Shivaganga
- Uma Shivakumar as the Basakka, Gowda's mistress
- Kalpana Sirur
- T. S. Nagabharana

== Production and theme ==
The film is based on a novel of the same name by Kannada writer Srikrishna Alanahalli. The story combines three interdependent themes – the tragedy that shocks the village, the tragic story of Kamali, and the story of the eight-year-old boy who visualises all these events. The story is seen through the eyes of Kitti. Ashish Rajadhyaksha and Paul Willemen in their book, Encyclopaedia of Indian Cinema, noted that the boy cannot distinguish between the "man-made violence" and the "primeval threats" presented by the dense forest; according to a legend, the forest has a killer bird that calls out its victims by name.

The film was Karnad's first venture as an independent director. (Note: He co-directed his debut film Vamsha Vriksha alongside B. V. Karanth.) Amrish Puri, a regular face in Shyam Benegal's films was chosen to play the main lead. The cinematography was handled by Govind Nihalani, who was also associated with Benegal. B. V. Karanth composed the film score and was in charge of art direction. T. S. Nagabharana, who would later go on to become an independent filmmaker, worked as a costume designer and assisted Karnad in the film.

== Legacy ==
Kaadu is regarded as one of the earliest Parallel Cinema in the Kannada film industry. Ashish Rajadhyaksha and Paul Willemen in their book, Encyclopedia of Indian Cinema, noted that Karnad's Kaadu and Benegal's Ankur placed both filmmakers "squarely within New Indian Cinema's ruralism".

Kamal Haasan called it one of his favourite films and said this film served as inspiration for his film Thevar Magan (1992).

== Awards ==
21st National Film Awards

- Second Best Feature Film – K. N. Narayan, G. N. Lakshmipathy (producers) and Girish Karnad (director)
- Best Actress – Nandini Bhaktavatsala
- Best Child Artist – Master G. S. Nataraj

Karnataka State Film Awards 1973-74

- Second Best Film
- Best Actress – Nandini Bhaktavatsala
- Best Story Writer – Srikrishna Alanahalli
- Best Sound Recording – A. Govindaswamy
- Best Child Actor – G. S. Nataraj

22nd Filmfare Awards South

- Best Film – K. N. Narayan and G. N. Lakshmipathy
- Best Director – Girish Karnad

4th International Film Festival of India

- Special Mention Award
