= Athini =

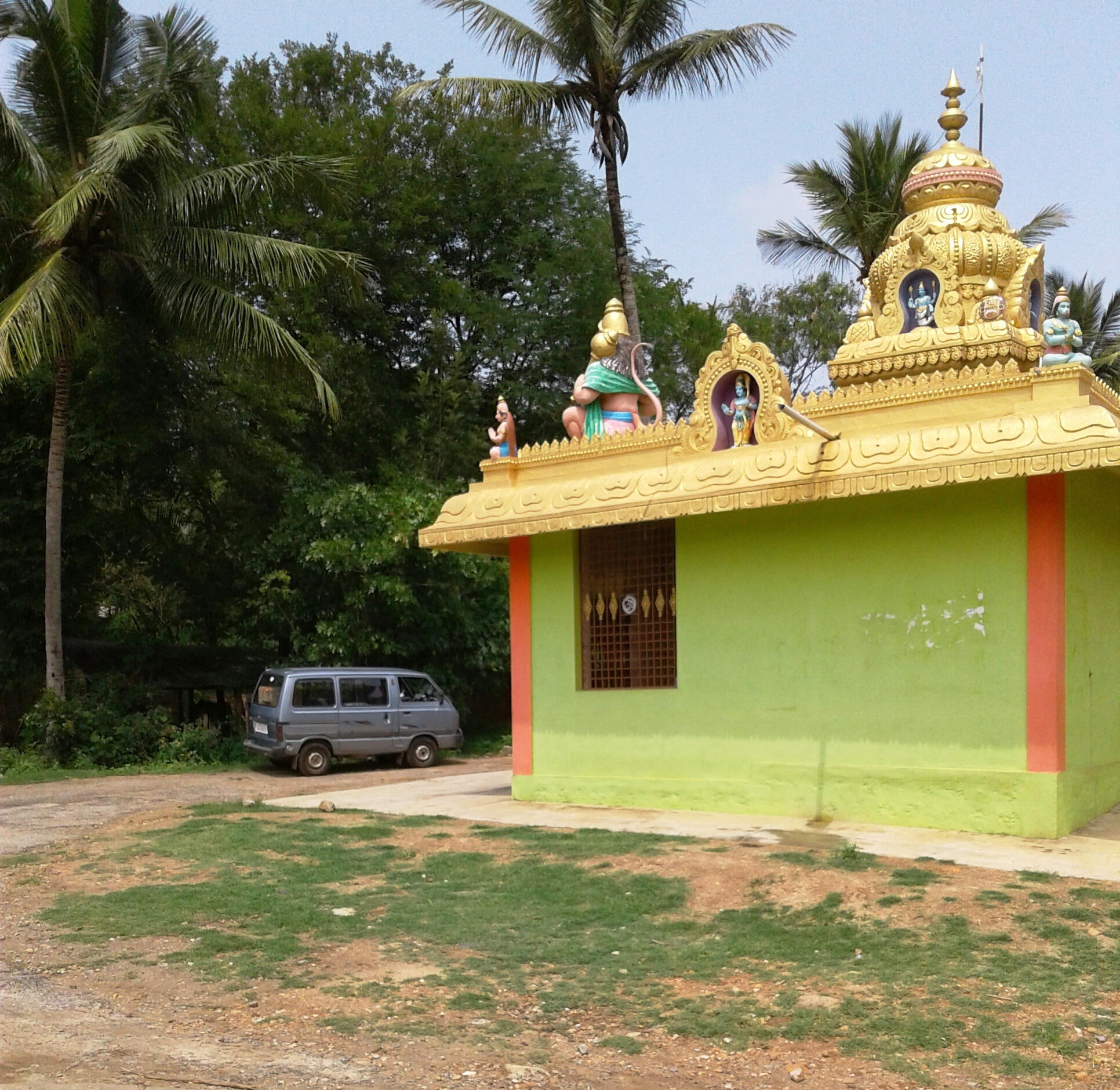
Temple in Athini village

Athini is a small village in Hassan district of Karnataka state, India.

== Location ==
Athini is located on the village road between Holenarasipura and Gorur dam. Aside from Gorur, nearby places include Karle, Chikkanahalli, Ganjalagodu and Arkalgud.

== Demographics ==
Covering 266 hectares (660 acres) and comprising 210 households at the time of the 2011 census of India, Athini had a population of 989. There were 491 males and 498 females, with 91 people being aged six or younger.

== Post services ==
There is a post office in Athini and the PIN code is 573120.

== Gallery ==
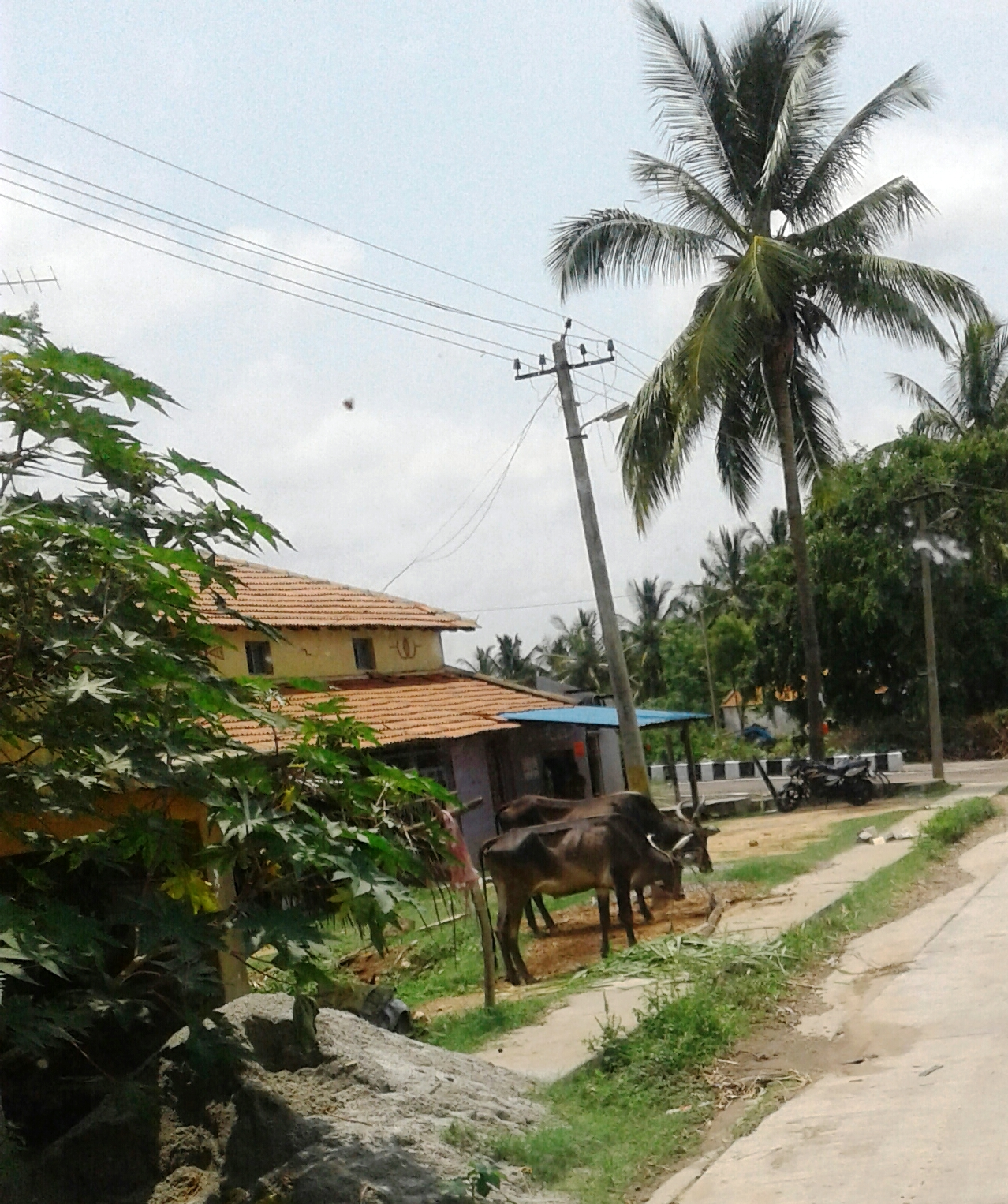

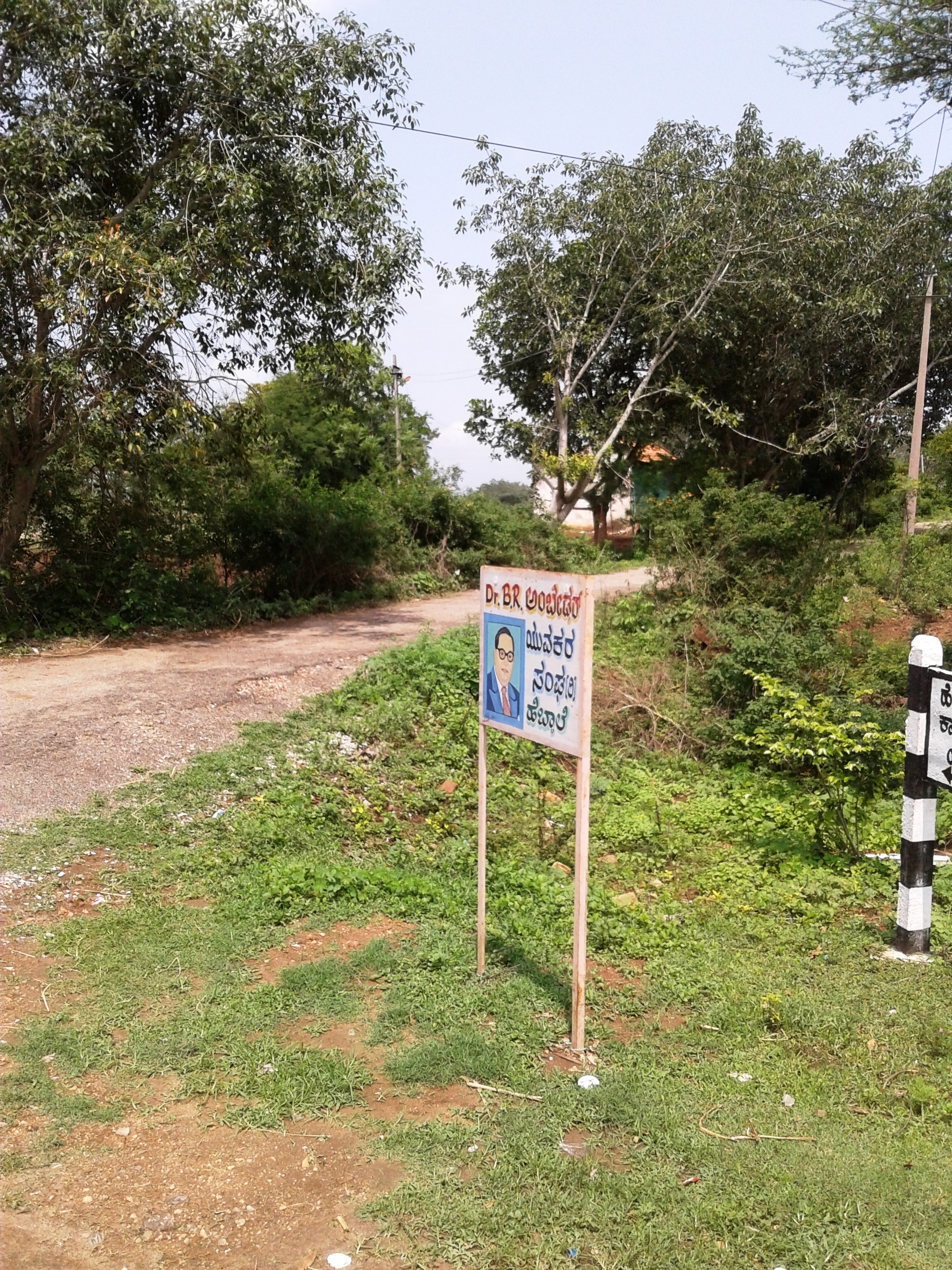

== See also ==
- Kadavina Hosahalli
