= Srikrishna Alanahalli =

Indian novelist and poet (1947–1989)

- Born: Srikrishna; 3 April 1947; Alanahalli, Kingdom of Mysore, British India
- Died: 4 January 1989 (aged 41); Mysuru, Karnataka, India
- Occupations: Novelist; poet
- Writing career
- Language: Kannada
- Notable works: Kaadu, Parasangada Gendetimma

Srikrishna Alanahalli (3 April 1947 – 4 January 1989) was an Indian novelist and poet. The majority of his works are written in the Kannada language. He became popular for his novels Kaadu (1972), Parasangada Gendethimma (1978) and Bhujangayyana Dasavataragalu (1982), all of which were adapted into films.

== Short stories ==
- Tapta
- Geejagana Goodu
- Finix
- Samagra Kathegalu
- Srikrishna Aalanahalli Sahitya Vachike — Ed: Vivek Shanbhag

== Poetry ==
- Mannina Haadu
- Kaadu Gidada Haadu Paadu
- Dogri Pahaadi Premageetegalu

== Novels ==
- Kaadu/ಕಾಡು
- Parasangada Gendethimma
- Bujangayyana Dashavataragalu
- Gode (sequel to Kaadu)

== Film adaptations of his work ==
- Kaadu (1973)
- Parasangada Gendethimma (1979)
- Geejagana Goodu (1975)
- Kurubara Lakkanoo Elizebheth Raaniyoo (1976)
- Rosappu Ravikkaikari (1979)
- Kannil Theriyum Kathaikal (1980)
- Bhujangayyana Dashavathara (1988)
