= Vandichakkaram =

1980 film by K. Vijayan

- Theatrical release poster
- Directed by: K. Vijayan
- Written by: Vinu Chakravarthy
- Produced by: Thirupur Mani
- Starring: Sivakumar; Saritha
- Cinematography: N. Balakrishnan
- Edited by: T. Rajasekhar
- Music by: Shankar–Ganesh
- Production company: Vivekananda Pictures
- Release date: 29 August 1980
- Country: India
- Language: Tamil

Vandichakkaram (transl. Cartwheel) is a 1980 Indian Tamil-language film directed by K. Vijayan and written by Vinu Chakravarthy. The film stars Sivakumar and Saritha. It revolves around a ruffian who, after falling in love, resolves to mend his ways.

Chakravarthy wrote the script in 1976, though production began only in 1979. It was supposed to be the 100th film of Sivakumar but eventually became his 101st to accommodate Rosappu Ravikkaikari (1979). The film was produced by Thirupur Mani, and shot at Mysore. It was the Tamil debut of Silk Smitha.

Vandichakkaram was released on 29 August 1980, and became one of Sivakumar's biggest hits. At the Filmfare Awards South, he and Saritha won the awards for Best Tamil Actor and Best Tamil Actress respectively. The film also won the Tamil Nadu State Film Award for Best Film—Third Prize. It was later remade in Hindi as Prem Pratigyaa (1989).

== Plot ==
Gaja is a ruffian. After falling in love with Vadivu, he resolves to mend his ways.

== Cast ==
- Sivakumar as Gaja
- Saritha as Vadivu
- Sivachandran as Sarathi
- Samikannu as Palayam
- Suruli Rajan as Maari
- Vinu Chakravarthy as Muthu
- A. Sakunthala as a thief
- Smitha as Silk
- Karuppu Subbiah

== Production ==
Vinu Chakravarthy wrote the script of Vandichakkaram in 1976, but the film's production began only in 1979. This was supposed to be the 100th film of Sivakumar but eventually became his 101st so that Rosappu Ravikkaikari (1979) could become his 100th. The film featured Sivakumar portraying a ruffian, completely different from the soft roles which he was portraying at that point of his career. This was the Tamil film debut of Vijayalakshmi, who later became known as the sex symbol Silk Smitha. Vinu Chakravarthy said he "chiseled" her character during the writing process for almost three years before production began.

Since the film demanded a vegetable market situated in a straight line, the crew finalised a market place named Devaraja Market in Mysore where the film was shot. Sivakumar revealed that the market place usually does not give permission to shoot but they specially gave permission only to this film's crew. The filming was also held at Premier Studios at Mysore. Smitha's voice was dubbed by Hema Malini. The song "Vaa Machan" was supposed to be picturised on Sivakumar's character; however, since it was felt the majesty of his role would be reduced if he had performed in the song, it was changed into his character drinking and being an onlooker at the dance.

== Soundtrack ==
The music composed by Shankar–Ganesh, and lyrics were penned by Pulamaipithan. The song "Vaa Machan Vaa" became hugely popular.

Track listing
No.	Title	Singer(s)	Length
1.	"Devi Vantha Neram"	S. P. Balasubrahmanyam, Vani Jairam	4:12
2.	"Oru Thai Maasam"	S. Janaki	3:10
3.	"Vaa Machan"	S. P. Balasubrahmanyam	5:24
Total length:			12:46

== Release ==
Vandichakkaram was released on 29 August 1980, and became one of the biggest hits of Sivakumar. At the Filmfare Awards South, Sivakumar and Saritha won the awards for Best Tamil Actor and Best Tamil Actress respectively. The film also won the Tamil Nadu State Film Award for Best Film—Third Prize.

== Critical reception ==
Writing for Kalki, Nalini Sastry said Vijayan was not pushing the cartwheel on the ground, but into the sky. Kungumam called Sivakumar as "Vidhyasamana Kumar" (transl. Different Kumar) for portraying a rowdy character. Dina Thanthi praised the acting of Vinu Chakravarthy while praising director Vijayan for portraying the fact that a goon can be submissive towards his wife's love. Naagai Dharuman of Anna praised the acting of Sivakumar, Saritha and other actors, cinematography, music, dialogues, direction but panned Surulirajan's humour.
