= Illindala Saraswati Devi =

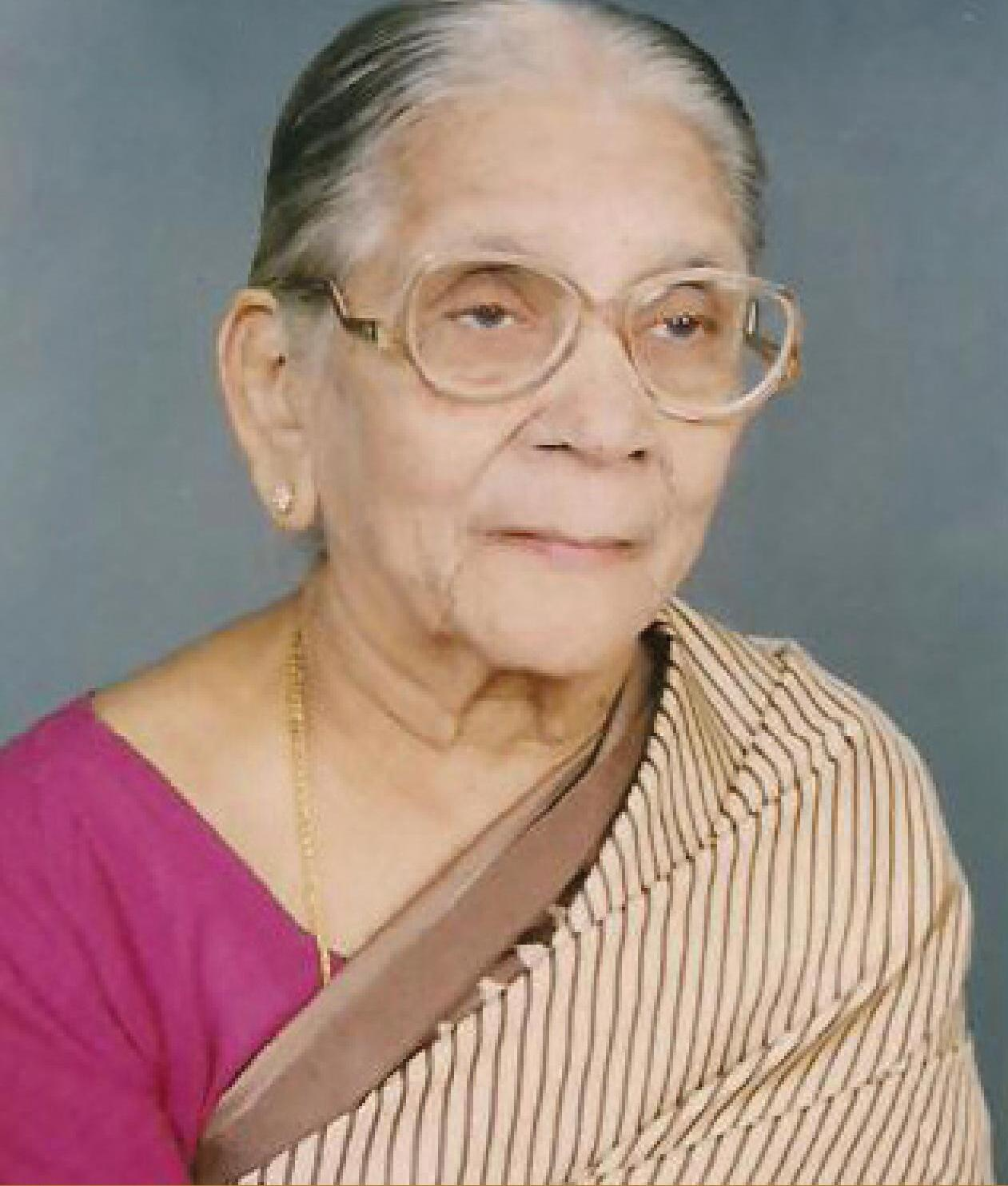
- Born: 15 June 1918; Narsapuram, West Godavari District, India
- Died: 1998 (aged 79–80)
- Occupations: Novelist; short story writer; biographer; essayist; social worker
- Writing career
- Language: Telugu
- Notable awards: Sahitya Akademi Award (1982)

Illindala Saraswati Devi (15 June 1918 – 1998) was a Telugu novelist, short story writer, biographer, essayist and social worker from Andhra Pradesh, India. She received the Sahitya Akademi Award in 1982 for her short story collection, Swarnakamalalu.

== Biography ==
Saraswati Devi was born in 1918 in Andhra Pradesh, India. She started the Andhra Yuvati Mandali, a women's educational and social organization in 1936. Some time after 1950, she completed a course in journalism at Osmania University. Subsequently she published several short stories in journals such as Bharati and Sujata. She served as a member of both the central and state Film Award Committees. She was a nominated member of the State Legislative Council from 1958 to 1966.

== Works ==
She has published over forty works, including twelve novels, several plays, and essays, biographies and short stories. She has used literature as a way of upholding ethical and cultural values. Her short story collection Swarnakamalalu depicts the multiplicity of human experience, insights into personal relationships, a progressive outlook and an engrossing style. She has also written children's literature, including a concise biography of Mahatma Gandhi, and Mahatmudu Mahila (Gandhiji's View about Woman), published in 1969 by Andhra Pradesh Sahitya Akademi.

Her other significant works are the novels: Muthyalu Manasu (1962; Muthtalu's heart), Darijerina Pranulu (1963; Lives That Have Reached the Shore), Tejomurtulu (1976; Icons of Light) and Akkaraku Vacchina Chuttamu (1967, A Helpful Relative); and the short story collection: Raja Hamsalu (1981, The Royal Swans). She has written over a hundred short stories which have since been published as a collection, Swarnakamalalu.

== Recognition ==
In appreciation of her services to literature she was honoured in 1964 with the Grihalakshmi Sanstha Gold Bangle Award. The Andhra Pradesh Sahitya Akademi awarded her the Best Woman Writer Award in 1974. She received the Sahitya Akademi Award in 1982 for her short story collection, Swarnakamalalu.
