= G. N. Lakshmipathy =

Indian film producer (1915–2019)

- Born: 7 May 1915 Gubbi, Mysore State, British India
- Died: 16 May 2019 (aged 104)
- Occupation: Film producer
- Awards: Dr. Vishnuvardhan Award (2017)

Gubbi Narasimha Lakshmipathy (7 May 1915 – 16 May 2019) was an Indian film producer from Karnataka. He produced seven films.

== Biography ==
Lakshmipathy was born at Gubbi in Tumakuru district, in the erstwhile Mysore State, British India. He produced films like Uyyale, Devara Makkalu, Kaadu, Chitegu Chinte and Ondanondu Kaladalli. He was awarded Dr. Vishnuvardhan Award 2017.

Lakshmipathy died on 16 May 2019 at the age of 104 in Bangalore, India.

== Selected filmography ==
- Uyyale (1969)
- Devara Makkalu (1970)
- Kaadu (1973)
- Chitegu Chinte (1974)
- Ondanondu Kaladalli (1978)
- Nentaro Gantu Kallaro (1979)
