= Nandini Bhaktavatsala =

Indian actress

Nandini Bhaktavatsala (born Prema) is an Indian actress who works in the Kannada film industry. She won the National Film Award for Best Actress in 1973 for the Kannada film Kaadu. She is married to Bhaktavatsala, a film producer.

== Biography ==
Nandini was born as Prema in Trichy, Madras Presidency. Her family moved to Mysore where her father, Prof. O.K. Nambiar, taught English & History at the Maharaja College. Subsequently, the family moved to Bangalore when Prof Nambiar transferred to work at Central College. She graduated from the Mount Carmel College and Maharani College Mysore. Prema met and married Kannada film industry Titan, Moola Bhaktavatsala, who was also the president of the Karnataka Film Chamber. Nandini's role in Girish Karnad's Kaadu won her that year's National Film Award for Best Actress. Prema has three children Ananda Ranga, Ved Manu & Dev Siri. As of 2016, she is the vice president of International Music and Arts Society, Bangalore.

== Filmography ==
- Kaadu (1973)
