= R. Nagarathnamma =

Indian theatre personality

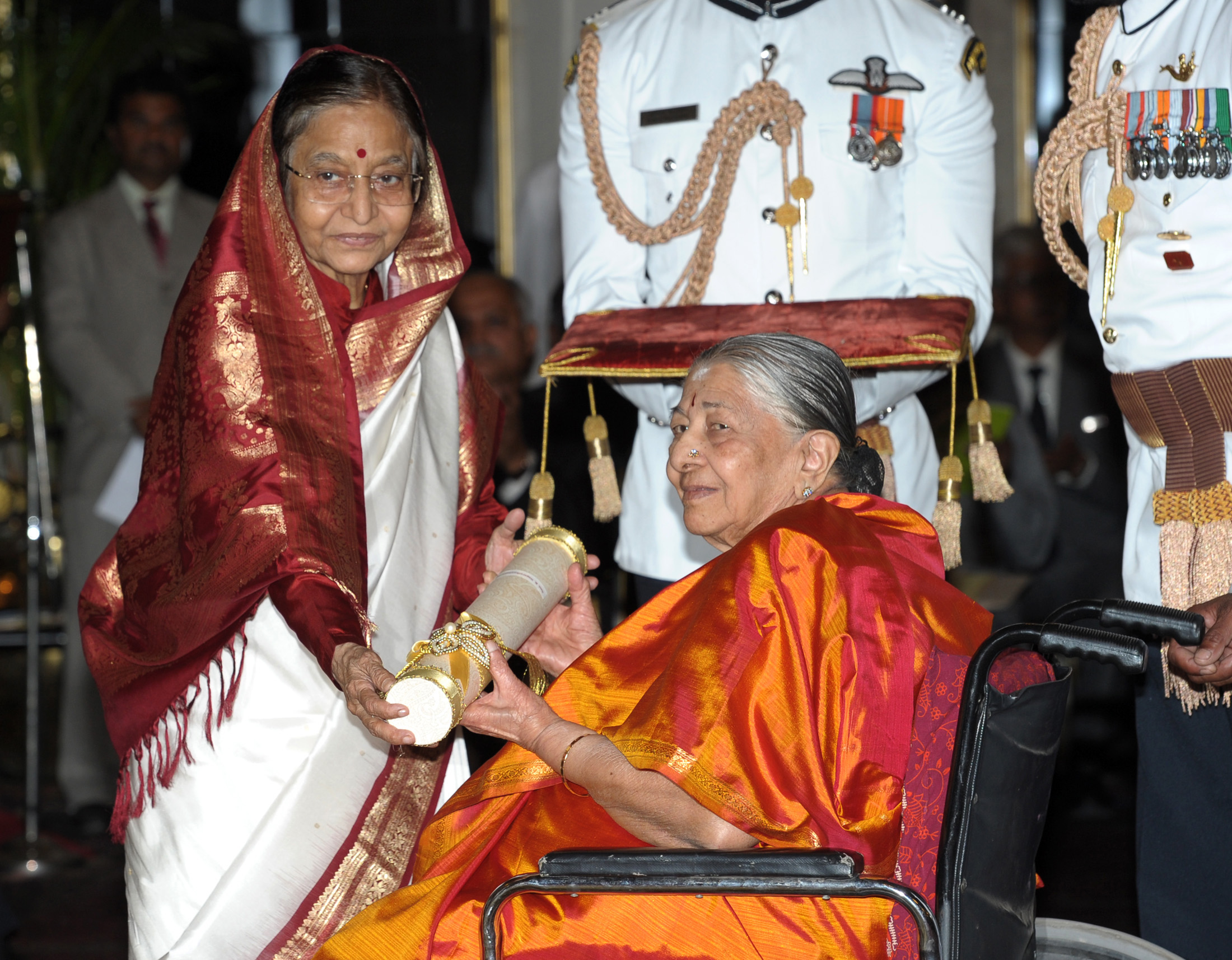
- Nagarathnamma receiving the Padma Shri Award from President Pratibha Patil in 2012
- Born: 1926; Mysore, Karnataka, India
- Died: 6 October 2012 (aged 85–86); Bengaluru
- Occupation: Theatre personality
- Years active: since 1938
- Children: two daughters and a son
- Awards: Padma Shri; Sangeet Natak Akademi Award; Kannada Rajyotsava Prashasti; Tagore Ratna Award; Gubbi Veeranna Award
- Website: Official web site

R. Nagarathnamma (1926–2012) was an Indian theatre personality and the founder of Stree Nataka Mandali, an all-women theatre group based in Bengaluru. A recipient of the Sangeet Natak Akademi Award, she was honored by the Government of India, in 2012, with the fourth highest Indian civilian award of Padma Shri.

== Biography ==
Nagarathnamma was born in 1926 in a family with moderate financial means, in Mysore, in the South Indian state of Karnataka. She started working in professional theatre at the age of 12, working with such troupes as Sri Chamundeshwari Nataka Sabha, Gubbi Company run by Gubbi Veeranna, Mitra Mandali of Hirannaiah and HLN Simha. Later, in 1958, Nagarathnamma established Stree Nataka Mandali, reported to be the first all-women theatre troupe from Karnataka where she performed as an actor and was the director of their plays.

Nagarathnamma is known for her depiction of male characters, especially mythological ones. She is credited with notable performances as Kamsa, Krishna, Ravana, Duryodhana and Bheema. She has travelled in many other states in India with her troupe and Krishna Garudi is stated to be one of her major plays. She has also acted in 15 Kannada and Tamil films, Kamanabillu, Parasangada Gendethimma and Rosapoo Ravikkaikari being some of the notable ones.

Nagarathnamma died on 6 October 2012, at the age of 87, after a brief period of illness.

== Awards and recognitions ==
Nagarathnamma was a recipient of many awards such as Tagore Ratna Award and Gubbi Veeranna Award. She has been honored by the Government of Karnataka with their second highest civilian award of Rajyotsava Prashasti. She received the Sangeet Natak Akademi Award in 1992. In 2012, the Government of India included her in the Republic Day honours list for the fourth highest Indian civilian award of Padma Shri. She was also conferred Sangeet Natak Akademi Tagore Ratna in 2012 as special awards to commemorate 150th Birth Anniversary of Rabindranath Tagore.

== See also ==
- Gubbi Veeranna
