= Mohan Kumar Kondajji =

Indian politician

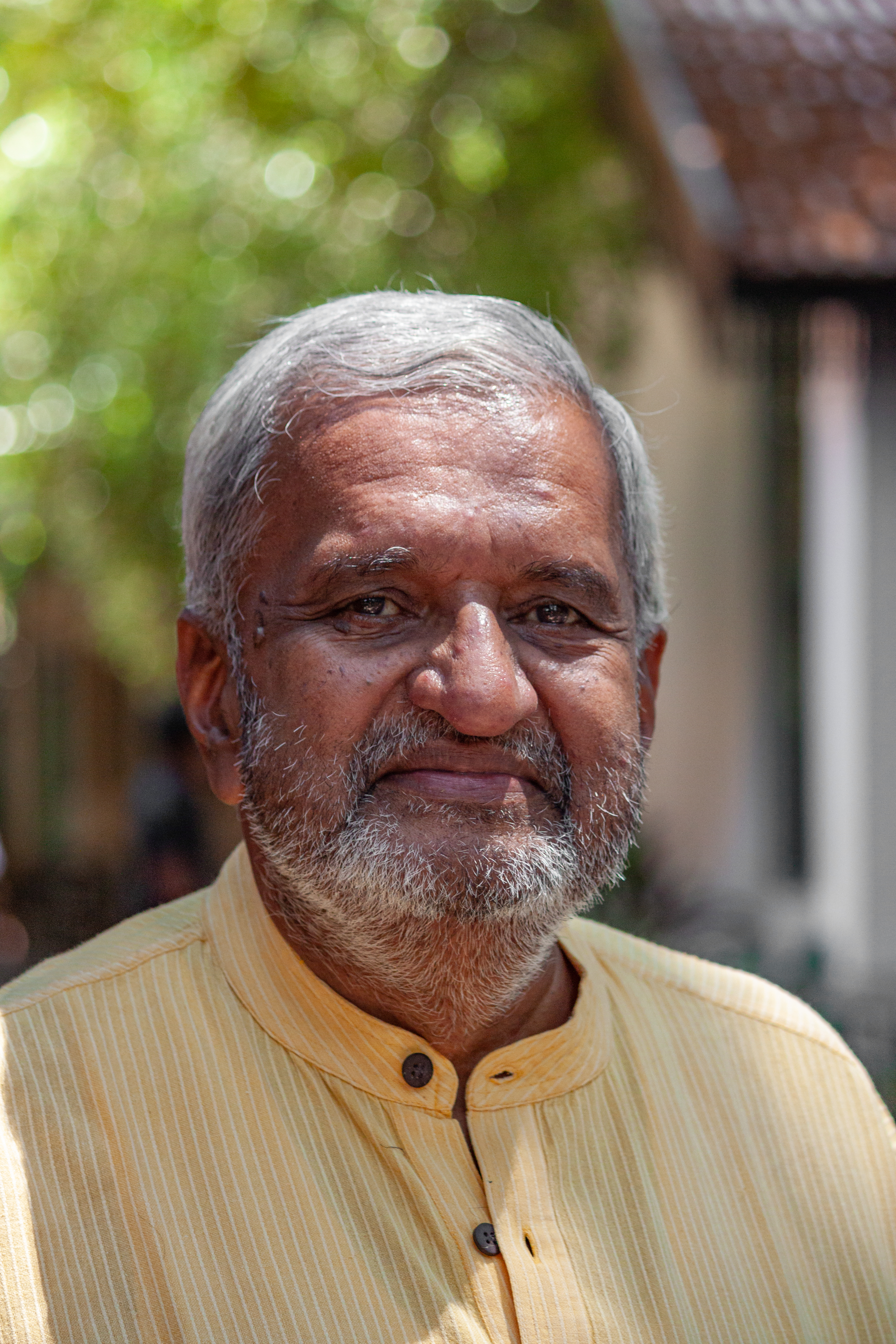
- Kondajji in 2024

Member of Karnataka Legislative Council
- In office 18 May 2017 – 17 May 2023
- Constituency: Nominated

Personal details
- Born: Mohan Kumar Kondajji
- Party: Indian National Congress

Mohan Kumar Kondajji is an Indian politician. A former spokesman of the Karnataka Pradesh Congress Committee (KPCC), he was a nominated member of the Karnataka Legislative Council for a six-year term from 2017 to 2023. He also served on the Karnataka State Pollution Control Board and on the jury of the National Film Awards – 2003.
