= Rohit Sharma (composer) =

Indian film composer

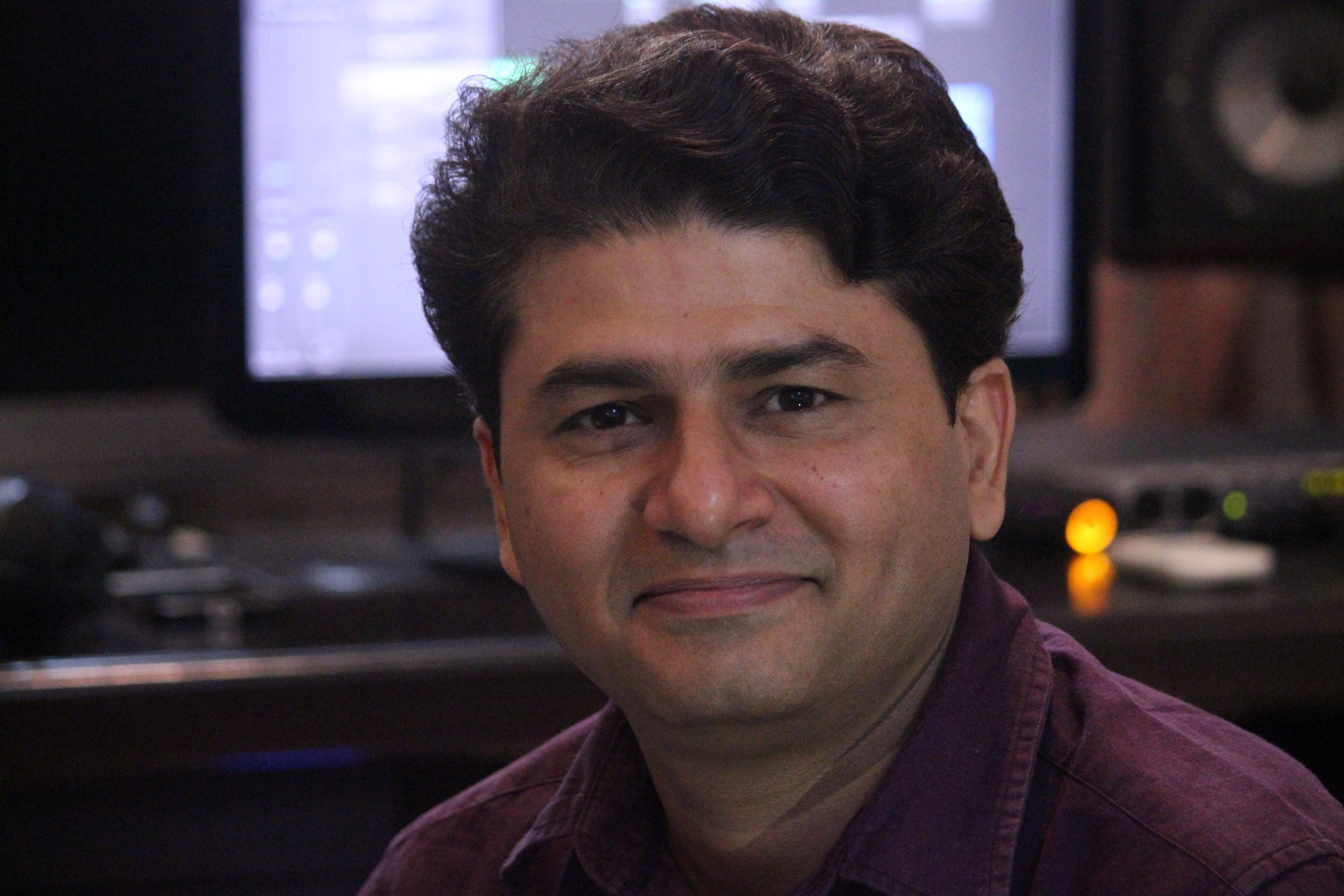
- Sharma at his Studio

Background information
- Born: New Delhi, India
- Genres: Soundtracks; Indian Film music; Indie pop; World Music
- Occupation: Music Composer
- Years active: 2005–present

Rohit Sharma is an Indian film composer, most famously known for being the music director of the film The Kashmir Files, directed by Vivek Agnihotri. His film composing career began during the early 2010s when he composed the song 'Naham Janami' which was featured in the critically acclaimed film Ship Of Theseus by director Anand Gandhi. Since then, he has composed music for films such as Buddha in a Traffic Jam (2016), Anaarkali of Aarah (2017), The Tashkent Files (2019), The Kashmir Files (2022) and more. In the OTT space, Rohit Sharma has worked on prominent titles such as Aspirants by The Viral Fever and Maharani 2 among others.

== Early life ==
Rohit Sharma was born in New Delhi, India and holds a bachelor's degree in engineering from Delhi College Of Engineering in 1996. Since childhood, he had a natural passion and talent for music and taught himself to play the Indian classical flute. Also a gifted singer, he excelled in music & singing competitions all through school and college, bagging multiple awards as a result. At the age of 17, he sought formal education from Pt. Harshwardhan for Classical Flute. Simultaneously, he trained himself in Western Classical Piano from the Delhi School of Music. In the year 2000, he quit his job to become a professional music composer in Mumbai, India.

== Career ==
His music career began with composing a number of jingles and music for TVCs, with agencies such as Ogilvy and Mather, Rediffusion Y&R, JWT, Mudra Communications and production companies namely Percept Pictures, Situations, Kiss Films, Ishana Movies and more. In 2009, he kickstarted his film composing career by composing and arranging the song 'Naham Janami' for the feature film Ship of Theseus. Further, he created the score for Buddha in a Traffic Jam in 2011. These two films were released in 2013 and 2016 respectively. While he earned notable recognition for his track in Ship of Theseus, Buddha In A Traffic Jam got him widespread critical acclaim for having seventeen tracks that included music genres as varied as tribal blues, folk rock and rock opera to blues and jazz. The soundtracks also included two nazms namely "Bekaar Kutte" and "Chand Roz", written by Faiz Ahmad Faiz, a revolutionary poet from Pakistan. He continued to compose music for several feature films during this period. In 2016, he scored the music for Anaarkali of Aarah, where he got the chance to experiment with folk music and folk songs from Bihar. This won him the Best Music Director award in the 8th Jagran Film Festival. In 2017, he created the background score for The Holy Fish and in 2019, he once again received widespread recognition when he composed all tracks of the film The Tashkent Files. His film composing career reached new heights when he composed the background score (9 themes) for The Kashmir Files. The soundtrack for this film was created by recording an orchestra in Budapest, and the longstanding, deep impact of this music won him laurels. He continued to deepen his collaboration with director Vivek Agnihotri by composing the evocative background score for The Vaccine War (2023). He went on to work on The Signature (2024), with Anupam Kher in the lead & direction by Gajendra Ahire, where he contributed both the songs and the score. In 2025, Rohit Sharma created all the songs for Ghich Pich and handled the background score for The Bengal Files. Further, he composed the song “Bawra Mann” and the score for The Taj Story, directed by Tushar Goel.

Rohit Sharma entered the OTT space in 2018 with composing three songs for the Indian web series Yeh Meri Family by The Viral Fever. In 2021, he composed four songs for the award-winning series Aspirants, again by TVF (The Viral Fever) including lending his own voice to one track viz. "Mohbhang". The series was nominated for the Best Original Soundtrack (Series) award in 2021 Filmfare OTT Awards and won the Best Music (Originals) Series award at IWM Digital Awards (2022). Rohit Sharma composed all songs for the series Maharani Season 2 (created by Subhash Kapoor), in 2022, where he was lauded for implementing rustic, folk styles from Bihar (where the series is set) in the soundtracks, one of the praises being from renowned folk singer Padma Bhushan Sharda Sinha herself, who was the singer for one of the tracks of this series. In the same year, he also composed two tracks for the web series Flames - Season 3 by The Viral Fever. In 2024, Sharma worked on Maharani Season 3, composing several tracks including “Kaun Bola Ban Hai”, “Kaun Thagwa Nagariya” and “Naya Savera”, and lent his voice to “Kaun Bola Ban Hai”. He was honoured with the Music Director Special Award at the Clef Music Awards in 2024 for his work on this season. In the same year, he also composed the track "Bakheda" for Maamla Legal Hai, a legal drama comedy series directed by Rahul Pandey, and sang "Sirsa Ka Phorey (Naam Ki Apne Tuti Bole)" from the same series.

In 2025, he contributed to the series Gram Chikitsalay, composing and singing the song “Kanchi Tori Kaya". Alongside composing the title song & background score for Uttar Da Puttar & Maamla Legal Hai - Season 2, in 2026, Rohit Sharma also composed, produced and recorded the theme for Anand Gandhi's audio book Maya - Seed Takes Root.

Besides composing music for films & OTT, Rohit Sharma is also part of a band called Swaang.

== Discography ==
| Denotes works that have not yet been released |

=== Films ===
| Year | Film | Song(s) | Credited As | Notes |
|---|---|---|---|---|
| 2011 | Buddha in a Traffic Jam | All Songs and Background Score | Music Composer and Music Producer | |
| 2012 | Ship of Theseus | "Naham Janami" | Music Composer and Music Producer | |
| 2014 | Shortcut Safari | All Songs and Background Score | Music Composer and Music Producer | |
| 2015 | Barefoot to Goa | All Songs | Music Composer and Music Producer | |
| 2017 | The Holy Fish | Background Score | Music Composer and Music Producer | |
| 2017 | Anaarkali of Aarah | All Songs and Background Score | Music Composer and Music Producer | |
| 2019 | The Tashkent Files | All Songs | Music Composer | |
| 2022 | The Kashmir Files | Background Score (9 Themes) | Music Composer | |
| 2023 | Dvand: The Internal Conflict | All Songs and Background Score | Music Composer | |
| | Dhatura | Two Songs and Background Score | Music Composer | |
| 2023 | The Vaccine War | Background Score | Music Composer | |
| 2024 | The Signature | All Songs and Background Score | Music Composer | |
| 2025 | Ghich Pich | All Songs | Music Composer | |
| 2025 | The Bengal Files | Background Score | Music Composer, Music Programmer & Arranger for "Dhono Dhannye Pushpe Bhora" | |
| 2025 | The Taj Story | "Bawra Mann" & Background Score | Music Composer | |

=== Web Shows (OTT) ===
| Year | Series | Song(s) | Credited As | Notes |
|---|---|---|---|---|
| 2018 | Yeh Meri Family | "Devi(L) Maa" "Shararatein" (Chitthi Song) "Dil Ki Baaton Mein" | Music Composer | |
| 2021 | Aspirants | "Mohbhang" "Bairagi" "Phod De Ya Chhod De" "Beparwaah" | Music Composer, Singer - "Mohbhang" | |
| 2022 | Maharani - Season 2 | All Songs | Music Composer and Music Producer | |
| 2022 | Flames 3 - Season 3 | "Naraaz Hai Hum" "Kadam Kadam Hai Rokta" | Music Composer | |
| 2024 | Maharani - Season 3 | "Kaun Bola Ban Hai" "Kaun Thagwa Nagariya" "Naya Savera" "Hum Nahi Maati Ke Khilona" "Bediyaan" | Music Composer, Singer - "Kaun Bola Ban Hai" | |
| 2024 | Maamla Legal Hai | "Bakheda" "Sirsa Ka Phorey (Naam Ki Apne Tuti Bole)" | Music Composer, Singer - "Sirsa ka Phorey (Naam ki Apne Tuti Bole)" | |
| 2025 | Gram Chikitsalay | "Kanchi Tori Kaya" | Music Composer & Singer | |
| 2026 | Uttar Da Puttar | Title Song & Background Score | Music Composer | |
| 2026 | Maamla Legal Hai - Season 2 | "Oh Bewafa" & Background Score | Music Composer | |
| 2026 | MAYA: Seed Takes Root (Audio book) | Theme | Music Producer, Composer and Recorder | |

== Awards ==
Best Music Director award in 8th Jagran Film Festival 2017 for the movie Anaarkali of Aarah.

Nominated as Best Original Soundtrack (Series) for Aspirants in 2021 Filmfare OTT Awards.

Best Music (Originals) Series for Aspirants in IWM Digital Awards (2022).
