= Darshan Kumar =

Indian actor

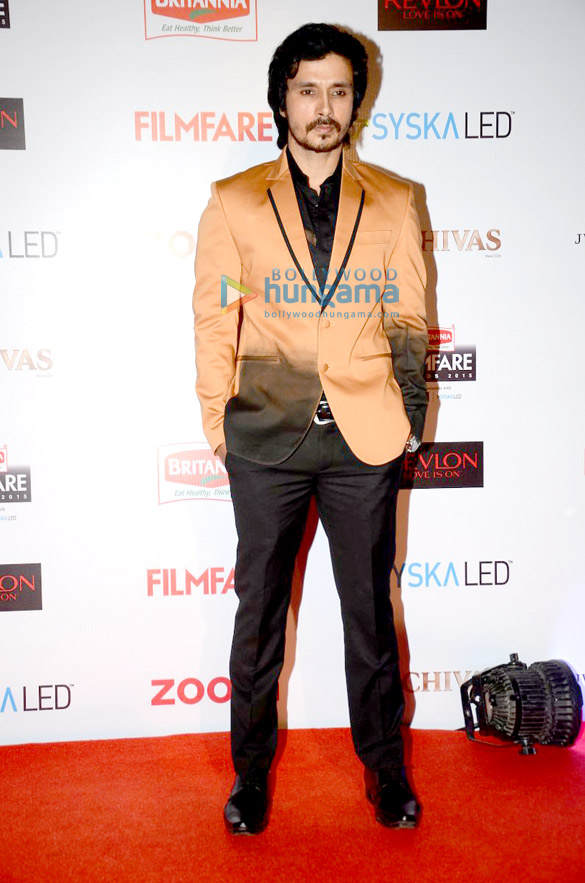
- Kumar at the 61st Filmfare Awards
- Born: Darshan Gandas; 1 September 1986 (age 40); Delhi, India
- Occupation: Actor
- Years active: 2003–present

Darshan Kumar Gandas (born 1 September 1986) is an Indian actor who works in Hindi films. He is known for his roles in Mary Kom (2014), NH10 (2015), and The Kashmir Files (2022).

== Early life ==
Kumar was born on 1 September 1985 in the Kishangarh Village in Delhi, India. He moved to Mumbai at the age of 24 and worked with the Sahej Theatre Group for five years, before joining Motley Productions, where he trained under actor Naseeruddin Shah for the next ten years.

== Career ==
Kumar made his film debut with a supporting role in the film Tere Naam in 2003 alongside Salman Khan; however, he made his debut in a leading role in NH10, portraying the antagonist opposite Anushka Sharma, In 2014, he achieved his breakthrough with the sports film Mary Kom, in which he portrayed the supportive husband of Priyanka Chopra’s character.

Kumar appeared in the successful devotional television series Devon Ke Dev...Mahadev, playing Shukracharya, the guru of the demons. He also played supporting roles in Chotti Bahu, Na Aana Is Des Laado, and Baba Aiso Varr Dhoondo.

In 2022, Kumar received further recognition when he starred in the critically acclaimed film, The Kashmir Files, directed by Vivek Agnihotri, in which he played a young student from a Kashmiri Pandit family.

== Filmography ==
=== Film ===
Year	Films	Role	Notes	Ref.
2001	Mujhe Kucch Kehna Hai	Friend		
2003	Tere Naam	Kanak Sharma		
2014	Mary Kom	Onler Kom		
2015	NH10	Satbir		
2016	Sarbjit	Awais Sheikh		
2017	Mirza Juuliet	Mirza		
2017	A Gentleman	Yakub Sabri		
2018	Baaghi 2	Shekhar Salgaonkar		
2019	PM Narendra Modi	Corrupt News Reporter		
2021	Toofaan	Dharmesh Patil	Special appearance	
2022	The Kashmir Files	Krishna Pandit		
2022	Dhokha: Round D Corner	ACP Harishchandra Malik		
2024	Kaagaz 2	Uday Narayan Singh		
2025	The Bengal Files	Shiva Aloke Pandit		
TBA	RMCS †			

=== Television ===
Year	Shows	Role	Ref.
2008	Chotti Bahu	Purab	
2009	Na Aana Is Des Laado	Constable Chandiram	
2010	Baba Aiso Varr Dhoondo	Mridang Lall	
2011	Devon Ke Dev...Mahadev	Shukracharya	
2012	Havan		

=== Web series ===
Year	Title	Role	Ref.
2019	Parchhayee	Leo	
2019	The Family Man	Major Sameer	
2020	Avrodh the Siege Within	Major Raunaq Gautam	
2020	Aashram	SI Ujagar Singh	

== Awards and nominations ==
Year	Award	Category	Work	Result	Ref.
2015	Producers Guild Film Awards	Best Actor in a Negative Role	NH10	Nominated	
2016	17th IIFA Awards	Best Performance in a Negative Role	NH10	Won	
2023	68th Filmfare Awards	Best Supporting Actor	The Kashmir Files	Nominated	
