= P. N. Oak =

Hindu-centric historical negationist

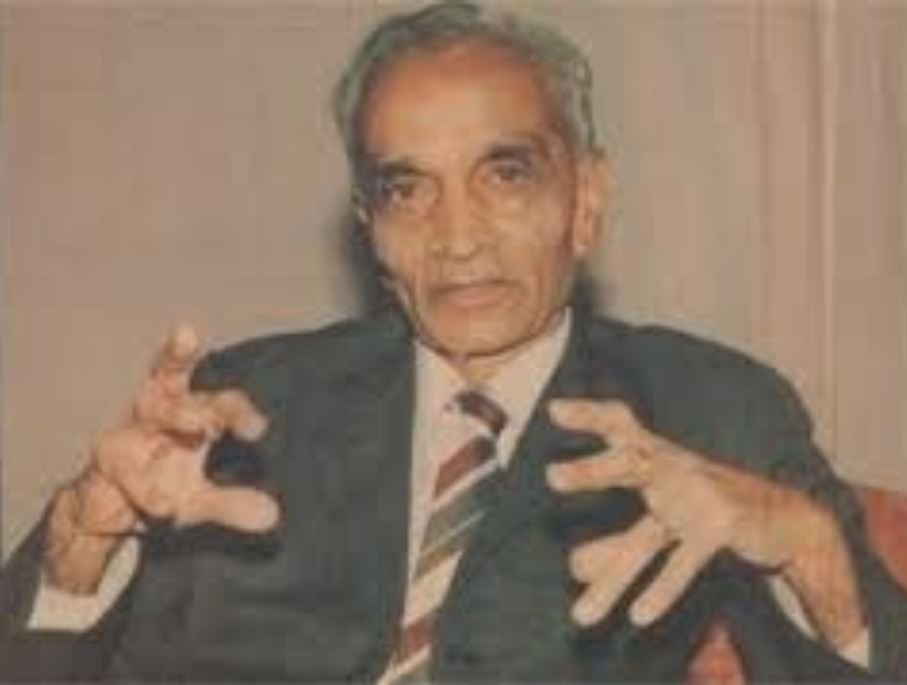
- Born: 2 March 1917; Indore, Indore State, British India
- Died: 4 December 2007 (aged 90); Pune, Maharashtra, India
- Occupation: Writer
- Known for: Historical negationism

Purushottam Nagesh Oak (2 March 1917 – 4 December 2007) was an pseudo-historical Hindutva author from India.

Among his prominent claims were that Christianity and Islam are both derivatives of Hinduism; that Vatican City, Kaaba, Westminster Abbey and the Taj Mahal were once Hindu temples dedicated to Shiva; and that the Papacy was originally a Vedic Priesthood. While all of these claims are demonstrably false and incompatible with historical and archaeological records, their reception in Indian popular culture has been noted by observers of contemporary Indian society. He ran an 'Institute for Rewriting Indian History' in the 1980s which published a quarterly periodical called Itihas Patrika dedicated to fringe causes; he had also written numerous books, some of which have even lead to court cases in a bid to alter the mainstream history narrative.

== Life ==
Oak was born in a Marathi Brahmin Family in 1917 in Indore in the erstwhile Princely State of Indore, British India. According to his own account, he completed an M.A. (Agra) and a law degree (LL.B. Mumbai), before being inducted as a Class I Gazetted officer in the Ministry of Information and Broadcasting wherein he wrote various journalistic pieces. Before joining the army, he also claims to have worked as an English tutor at Fergusson College in Pune. During World War II he enlisted in the Indian National Army, which fought alongside the Japanese against the British. He served in the propaganda sections, but was never captured by the British after the end of hostilities. According to his own account he skillfully evaded capture as he journeyed from Singapore to Calcutta between 1945 and 1946. While in the Army, he wrote a play called Rani of Zanshi: A Play in Three Acts, it had been produced to commemorate the first anniversary of the founding of the Rani of Jhansi Regiment (the Women's Regiment) of the INA in July 1943.

In 1964, he founded an organisation called Institute for Rewriting Indian History. He died on 4 December 2007, at 3.30 am at his Pune residence aged 90.

== Historical Negationism ==
=== Taj Mahal Theory ===
In 2000 India's Supreme Court dismissed Oak's petition to declare that a Hindu king had built the Taj Mahal by saying he had a "bee in his bonnet" about the Taj. As of 2017, several court cases about Taj Mahal being a Hindu temple have been inspired by Oak's theory. In August 2017, Archaeological Survey of India stated there was no evidence to suggest the monument ever housed a temple.

Giles Tillotson calls Oak's claims as a "desperate bid to assign a new meaning to the Taj" and "pseudo-scholarship". He states that Oak interprets the statements of Padshahnama about Shah Jahan's purchase of the land for the Taj from Jai Singh I upon where a mansion built by an ancestor of the Raja earlier existed, to claim that Taj Mahal was a wonder of ancient Hinduism. Tillotson adds that no evidence is offered by Oak to redate it to thirteen centuries earlier. He adds that the technical know-how to construct structural buildings didn't exist in 4th-century India, Oak's original claim, the only surviving architecture being rock-cut or monolithic. Oak later dropped this claim and claimed it to be from the 12th century. He adds that Oak claims Mughals built nothing and only converted Hindu buildings. In relation to similarity with buildings of West Asia, Oak also claims them all to be "products of Hindu architecture".

=== Kaaba Theory: Vedic origins ===
In a 13-page pamphlet titled Was Kaaba a Hindu Temple?, Oak derives a claim of a "Vedic past of Arabia" based on an inscription mentioning the legendary Indian king Vikramāditya that Oak claims was found inside a dish inside the Kaaba. According to Oak, the text of the alleged inscription is taken from the page 315 of an anthology of poetry entitled Sayar-ul-Okul (Se'-arul Oqul meaning the memorable words), compiled in 1742 on the orders of a "Sultan Salim" (the actual Sultan at the time being Mahmud I, sultan Selim III lived from 1761 to 1808) from the earlier work of prophet Muhammed's uncle Amr ibn Hishām (poetic name "Abu al-Ḥakam" (or ابوالحكم) or meaning the "Father of wisdom") who had refused to convert to Islam, and, first modern version published in 1864 in Berlin and a subsequent edition was published in Beirut in 1932. Oak goes on to state that the anthology is kept in the "Makhtab-e-Sultania Library" (Galatasaray Mekteb-i Sultanisi or Galatasaray Imperial School) in Istanbul, Turkey which has been now renamed as Galatasaray Lisesi school.

== Reception ==
Srinivas Aravamudan notes Oak to be a 'mythistorian' whose work resorted to exploiting comparative philology in the generation of delusional etymologies—associating Sanskrit sound-alikes with foreign terms such as Vatican to vatika (hermitage), Christianity to Krishna-niti (the way of Krishna), Abraham as an aberration of Brahma -- to purvey an Islamophobic and anti-Christian agenda under the covers of Hindutva. Edwin Bryant in his work on Indo-Aryan theory describes Oak to be a self-styled historian whose works suffer from an ubiquitous and very poor standard of professionalism and critical methodology and who fit the definition of a crack-pot.

Giles Tillotson describes Oak's work on Taj Mahal as a "startling piece of pseudo-scholarship", which was plainly a work of polemical fantasy intended to denigrate Islam and did not merit any serious scholarly attention. Art historian Rebecca Brown described Oak's books as "revisionist history as subtle as Captain Russell's smirk" (referring to a character in the Hindi movie Lagaan).

Oak's theories have been noted to have found a popular following among right-wing Hindu factions in a bid to wage politico-religious battles. Tapan Raychaudhuri has referred to him as "a 'historian' much respected by the Sangh Parivar."

== Books by P.N. Oak ==
- The Taj Mahal was a Rajput Palace, 1965.
- Indian Kshatriyas once ruled from Bali to Baltic & Korea to Kaba, 1966.
- The rationale of astrology, 1967.
- Who says Akbar was great, 1968.
- Bhārata meṃ Muslim Sultān, 1968.
- Some Missing Chapters of World History, 1973.
- Lucknow's imambaras are Hindu palaces, 1976.
- Delhi's Red Fort is Hindu Lalkot, 1976.
- Christianity is Chrisn-nity, 1979.
- World Vedic heritage: a history of histories : presenting a unique unified field theory of history that from the beginning of time the world practiced Vedic culture and spoke Sanskrit, 1984.
- Fatehpur Sikri ek Hindu Nagri, 2008.

He wrote in English, Hindi and Marathi. Most of his books were published by Bharati Sahitya Sadan or Hindi Sahitya Sadan, Delhi.

== See also ==
- Taj Mahal#Myths
- Historical negationism
- Nationalization of history
- Hindutva
- Hindutva pseudohistory
- The Taj Story
