= 19th January (film) =

- Directed by: Sanjay Amar
- Written by: Sanjay Amar
- Produced by: Deepmala Tanwar; Mumtaz Ahmad; Sanjay Amar
- Starring: Deepti Naval; K. K. Raina; Madhuri Bhatia; Prashantt Guptha; Bidita Baig; Mumtaz Ahmad; Attique Multani
- Cinematography: Neelabh Kaul
- Edited by: Mohit Garg
- Music by: Alif (Highway 61)
- Production company: Blueberry Entertainment
- Distributed by: Amar Chand Motion Pictures
- Release date: 3 January 2014
- Running time: 120 minutes
- Country: India
- Language: Hindi

19th January is a 2014 Indian Hindi-language drama film written and directed by Sanjay Amar. Produced by Deepmala Tanwar, Mumtaz Ahmad & Sanjay Amar, the film presents a fictional storyline centred around the 1990 exodus of Kashmiri Hindus from Indian-administered Kashmir. It stars Deepti Naval, K. K. Raina, Madhuri Bhatia, Prashantt Guptha, and Bidita Baig.

== Premise ==
19th January depicts the exodus and the events leading up to the exodus followed the rise of violence in an insurgency in Jammu and Kashmir as a genocide. The film follows the journey of a child who grows up in strife-torn Kashmir to become a popular musician, and showcases events leading to an investigation about his identity, and his family's turmoil.

== Cast ==
- Deepti Naval as Naseema
- K. K. Raina as Prof. Bashir Ahmed
- Madhuri Bhatia as Senior NIA cop
- Mumtaz Ahmad as Fanatic
- Bidita Bag as Masrat
- Attique Multani as NIA chief
- Prashantt Guptha as NIA cop
- Mukul Nag as Saint
- Mohd. Muneem Nazir as Owais Ahmad
- Ashraf Shawl as Prof. Krishan Mujoo
- Hridyanshu Slathia young Owais Ahmad

== Reception ==
The film was premiered at the Festival of Globe in Silicon Valley, San Francisco, United States, where it received a standing ovation.

== See also ==
- The Kashmir Files, Indian film set during the exodus
- Shikara, Indian film set during the exodus
- The Kerala Story, Indian film based on the love jihad conspiracy theory
- Inshallah, Kashmir, Indian documentary film based on the exodus
- The Kashmir Files: Unreported, 2023 docuseries based on the film
