= The Taj Story =

2025 film by Tushar Amrish Goel

- Theatrical release poster
- Directed by: Tushar Amrish Goel
- Written by: Tushar Amrish Goel; Saurabh M. Pandey
- Produced by: CA Suresh Jha
- Starring: Paresh Rawal; Zakir Hussain; Amruta Khanvilkar; Namit Das; Sneha Wagh
- Cinematography: Satyajit Hajarnis
- Edited by: Himanshu M Tiwarii
- Music by: Rohit Sharma; Rahul Dev Nath
- Production company: Swarnim Global Services Pvt. Ltd.
- Release date: 31 October 2025
- Running time: 165 minutes
- Country: India
- Language: Hindi

The Taj Story is a 2025 Indian Hindi-language courtroom drama film written and directed by Tushar Amrish Goel, and produced by CA Suresh Jha under the banner of Swarnim Global Services Pvt. Ltd. It stars an ensemble cast of Paresh Rawal, Zakir Hussain, Amruta Khanvilkar, Namit Das, and Sneha Wagh. It faced criticism over its historical inaccuracies and conspiracy theories, and has been labeled a Hindutva propaganda film by critics. The Taj Story was theatrically released on 31 October 2025. It received negative reviews.

== Cast ==
- Paresh Rawal as Vishnu Das
- Zakir Hussain as Adv. Anwar Rashid
- Amruta Khanvilkar as Harsha Patel
- Namit Das as Avinash Das
- Sneha Wagh as Sushmita Das
- Latika Raj as Tarasha
- Shishir Sharma as Dr. Shrinivas Patel
- Akhilendra Mishra as Vibhooti
- Brijendra Kala as Adv. Shashikant
- Anil George as Nawaz Khan
- Shrikant Verma as Vivek Dubey
- Sidharth Bhardwaj as Manoj Rathi
- Garima Agarwal
- Abhijit Lahiri as Chief Justice Subrato Chatterjee
- Atul Bishnoi as Justice R.K. Kushwaha
- Pankaj Berry as Rehan Habib
- Karamveer Choudhary
- Flora Jacob as Urmila Bishnoi
- Aashit Chatterjee as Usman Beg
- Binu Jha as Ritu Deewan
- Swarnim Jha as Kittu
- Sarvagaya Jha as Bittu
- Vishwa Bhanu
- Gauri Shankar
- Börje Lundberg
- Prateek Kumar
- Roshni Bhagat

== Production ==
Filming began on 20 July 2024. Actor Paresh Rawal confirmed his involvement in the project on 28 May 2024 through a post on his X handle. Principal photography was carried out over 45 days across multiple locations in northern India. Major portions were shot in Dehradun and Agra, including sequences at the Taj Mahal, Mehtab Bagh, and surrounding areas. For certain scenes, flowers were desired, but the Archaeological Survey of India did not allow them to be brought inside the monument. The shoot was completed in November 2024.

== Release ==
The film was theatrically released on 31 October 2025 in all over India.

=== Streaming rights ===
The streaming rights of this movie were acquired by Lionsgate Play and starts to stream on from 13 March 2026. On 8 August, this movie is also to be available to stream on JioHotstar.

== Reception ==
The Taj Story generally received negative reviews from the critics.

Lachmi Deb Roy of Firstpost gave the film 2 out of 5 stars, calling it an "overstretch", and writing, "The story had all it needed to make for a good film, but weak script and bad execution massacred it all". Ritika Srivastav of India Today awarded it 2.5 stars, writing, "The accents are genuinely impressive, and there are flashes of clever use of AI-generated visuals. But none of it compensates for the film’s glaring weaknesses: the lazy writing, the filler female characters, and the total lack of focus".

Shubhangi Shah, writing for The Week wrote, "The Taj Story falls flat and not just as a propaganda film, because I can dare even the firm rightwing supporters to sit through this three-hour-long film, which can be a test for both your patience as well as intellect". Saibal Chatterjee, writing for NDTV, rated the movie at 2/5 and concluded, "The Taj Story is a throw of dice that is all over the place. Even Paresh Rawal cannot save it".

Alaka Sahani of The Indian Express rated it 1.5/5 stars and said that "At 165 minutes, The Taj Story trudges on without offering any real answers to the questions it raises. Instead, it merely stirs the pot, blending fact and fiction to serve an agenda far removed from historical inquiry". Devesh Sharma of Filmfare gave 2 stars out of 5 and said that "The Taj Story endorses the belief that the Taj Mahal is a Hindu structure. The film pretends neutrality while continuously feeding an ideological hunger". Shilajit Mitra of The Hollywood Reporter India stated that it is "A bird-brained film that treats history like claydough", adding "And yet [...] The Taj Story lacks the courage of its convictions. The film can't decide for certain if the Taj Mahal was indeed a palace or a temple, and thus keeps both possibilities open. An unusually long disclaimer urges audiences to "verify facts independently", before the film hammers them over the head with its singular version of the 'truth'. One moment Das is quoting from the Badshah Nama, the official history of Shah Jahan's reign, and in the next moment, decrying all official accounts since c.1400 as fabricated 'propaganda'. The film's clinching argument rests on a Carbon-14 dating test of a piece of wood purportedly done by an American archaeologist in the late 1950s, yet it furnishes an entirely made-up name (Peter Williams) and no citations for said archaeologist".

Shreyanka Mazumdar of News 18 rated it 2/5 stars and said that "The Taj Story is certainly designed to spark curiosity — and perhaps even challenge long-held beliefs. But the line between raising questions and pushing an agenda becomes blurry".

== Response and controversy ==
=== Historical accuracy debate ===
Following its announcement, The Taj Story attracted widespread criticism and trolling on social media, with many accusing the filmmakers and trade analyst Komal Nahta of promoting a contentious and divisive subject. The film's narrative, which appears to draw inspiration from claims popularized by writer P. N. Oak, asserts that the Taj Mahal was originally a Hindu temple named Tejo Mahalaya. These claims have been widely debunked by mainstream historians and archaeologists as pseudo-history lacking credible evidence. India's Supreme Court dismissed Oak's petition to declare the Taj Mahal a Hindu temple, describing his views as a “bee in his bonnet”.

=== Propaganda allegations ===
The film has been widely labeled as a propaganda piece promoting Hindutva narratives, with critics arguing it fuels communal tensions by challenging the established history of the Taj Mahal as a Mughal-era mausoleum built by Shah Jahan. Critics, including those on platforms like Twitter, compared the film to other controversial titles like The Kashmir Files, accusing it of pushing a historically revisionist agenda.

=== Poster backlash and disclaimers ===
The controversy escalated in September 2025 when Paresh Rawal shared a motion poster depicting a Shiva idol emerging from the Taj Mahal's dome, prompting accusations of promoting conspiracy theories and religious division. Following significant backlash, Rawal deleted the post and shared a disclaimer from Swarnim Global Services Pvt. Ltd., stating: "The movie does not deal with any religious matters, nor does it claim that a Shiv temple resides within the Taj Mahal. It focuses solely on historical facts". However, historians have argued that the film's narrative aligns with Hindutva-driven myths, citing historical petitions like one filed in 2022 in Agra to investigate alleged Hindu temple remnants within the Taj Mahal.

=== CBFC scrutiny ===
Due to its sensitive subject matter, the film faced rigorous review by the Central Board of Film Certification (CBFC). The clearance process spanned several months, with the CBFC requiring director Tushar Amrish Goel and producer CA Suresh Jha to submit detailed historical documents to substantiate the film's claims about the Taj Mahal's origins. This level of scrutiny was noted as unusual, reflecting concerns about potential communal sensitivities.

=== Institutional and legal pushback ===
The controversy surrounding The Taj Story mirrors broader debates in India about historical revisionism and communal narratives. Petitions, such as one filed in Agra in 2022, have sought to open locked rooms in the Taj Mahal to search for alleged Hindu idols or temple remnants, claims consistently refuted by the Archaeological Survey of India (ASI), which maintains the Taj Mahal is a Mughal-era mausoleum.
