= 8th Jagran Film Festival =

Film festival edition

- Festival poster
- Opening film: The Fakir of Venice (film)
- Closing film: Xiang Yang De Ri Zi ( Sun Flower)
- Location: Delhi Kanpur Lucknow Allahabad Varanasi Patna Dehradun Ranchi Jamshedpur Bhopal Indore Hisar Ludhiana Meerut Raipur Mumbai, India
- Founded: 2010
- Festival date: 1 July 2017 – 24 September 2017
- Website: www.jagranfilmfestival.co.in

The 8th Jagran Film Festival is organized in 16 cities of India namely, Delhi, Kanpur, Lucknow, Allahabad, Varanasi, Patna, Dehradun, Ranchi, Jamshedpur, Bhopal, Indore, Hisar, Ludhiana, Meerut, Raipur, and Mumbai. This edition of the festival will showcase 185 films from all around the world. The festival is an initiative of Jagran Prakashan Group, a publishing house listed on the Bombay Stock Exchange and the National Stock Exchange of India, aimed at promoting the appreciation of the cinematic art beyond the major metropolitan cities of India to smaller towns. The 8th Jagran Film Festival was held from July 1 to September 24, 2017. The first edition of Jagran Film Festival was held in the year 2010.

== Jury ==
=== Indian showcase jury ===
The following people were on the jury for the Indian Features section:

- Sudhir Mishra, director and screenwriter
- Divya Dutta, Indian Actress
- Sunny Joseph, director and cinematographer
- Sankalp Meshram, director, producer, writer and editor
- Harmeet Singh, music director

=== Jagran shorts jury ===
The following people were on the jury for Jagran shorts section:

- Barry John, Indian theatre director and teacher
- Makarand Deshpande, actor, writer and director
- Aarti Chhabria, Indian actress

=== Cinema Of The Sellers jury ===
The following people were on the jury for Cinema of the Sellers section:

- Sonal Dabral, scriptwriter, chairman and CCO of DDB Mudra Group (India)
- Kailash Surendranath, director and co-founder of Kailash Picture Company
- Raj Nair, writer, CEO and CCO of Madison BMB
- Nima DT Namchu, CCO of Havas Worldwide (India)
- Prasoon Pandey, director and co-founder of Corcoise Films

=== International jury ===
The following people were on the jury for International Features section:

- Rahul Rawail, film director
- Rauf Ahmed, Journalist, film critic and author
- Jainardhan Sathyan, film director, producer and editor

== Official selections ==
=== Indian Showcase ===
This section is dedicated to the Indian Feature Films from all the regions of the country. The following films are under the Indian Feature section:

- A Billion Color Story by P.Narasimhamurthy
- Allama by T.S. Nagabharana
- Amaraavati by B M Giriraj
- Anaarkali of Aarah by Avinash Das
- Angamaly Diaries by Lijo Jose Pellissery
- Bareilly Ki Barfi by Ashwiny Iyer Tiwari
- Charandas Chor by Shyam Maheshwari
- Doctor Rakhmabai by Anant Mahadevan
- Hindi Medium by Saket Chaudhary
- Jolly LLB 2 by Subhash Kapoor
- Kaabil by Sanjay Gupta
- Kaatru Veliyidai by Mani Ratnam
- Martin by Jeetendra Shikerkar
- Messi by Riingo Banerjee
- Mukti Bhawan by Shubhashish Bhutiani
- Phillauri by Anshai Lal
- Pink by Aniruddha Roy Chowdhury
- Posto by Shiboprosad Mukherjee, Nandita Roy
- Raees by Rahul Dholakia
- Rama Rama Re by D. Sathyaprakash
- Shaanu-The Optimist by K. N. T. Sastry
- Shivaay by Ajay Devgn
- Sonata by Aparna Sen
- Super Singh by Anurag Singh
- The Ghazi Attack by Sankalp
- Toilet: Ek Prem Katha by Shree Narayan Singh
- Trapped by Vikramaditya Motwane

=== World Panorama ===
This section is dedicated to Foreign Feature Films. It includes feature films from different countries. The following films are under World Panorama section:

- Blue Silence by Bülent Öztürk
- Corporate by Nicolas Silhol
- Dark Blue Girl by Mascha Schilinski
- Pretty Far From Okay (Einmal Bitte Alles) by Helena Hufnagel
- The Alley (El Callejόn) by Caro Duarte
- Back to 97 (Em 97 Era Assim) by Zeca Brito
- Inner Court (Foro ĺntimo) by Ricardo Mehedff
- Golden Five by Goran Trenchovski
- Point Of View (‘Im Auge Des Betrachters’) by Otwin Karl Biernat
- The Desert Bride(La Novia Del Desierto) by Cecilia Atán
- Last Christmas by Christiano Pahler
- The Red Lands (Le Terre Rosse) by Giovanni Brancale
- Napoli Underground by Salvatore Polizzi
- Purple Horizons by Olgun Ӧzdemir
- Side B by David Yánez
- Still Summer by Yoon Hyung Chul
- The Black Prince by Kavi Raz
- Wood For The Trees (Vor Lauter Bäumen) by Pablo Callisaya
- Rage (Wściekłość) by Michał Węgrzyn

=== Special Screening ===
The following films are under the Special Screening section:

- Antareen by Monjul Baruah
- Eh Janam Tumhare Lekhe by Harjit Singh
- Gurgaon by Shanker Raman
- Moh Maya Money by Munish Bhardwaj
- Naam Shabana by Shivam Nair
- Tope (The Bait) by Buddhadeb Dasgupta

=== Homage ===
The 8th edition of Jagran film festival pays homage to some of the veteran actors by screening their popular films. The following films were screened under the Homage section:

- "Vinod Khanna"- Achanak by Gulzar
- "Om Puri"- Dharavi by Sudhir Mishra
- "Reema Lagoo"- Rui Ka Bojh by Subhash Agarwal
- "Jeanne Moreau"- Jules Et Jim by François Truffaut

== Awards ==
The following prizes were awarded:

- Best Make Up– Ruhee Bindra for “Raees”
- Best Costume– Purnima Oak for “Doctor Rakhmabai”
- Best Set Design– Aman Vidhate for “Doctor Rakhmabai”
- Best Sound Re-Recordist– Anish John for “Trapped”
- Best Cinematography – K.U. Mohanan for “Raees”
- Best Editing – Nitin Baid for Raees
- Best Screenplay– Padmakumar Narasimhamurthy for “A Billion Color Story”
- Best Background Score – Ram Sampath for “Raees”
- Best Lyrics – Tanveer Ghazi for “Pink”
- Best Singer Female – Rekha Bhardwaj for “Anaarkali of Aarah”
- Best Singer Male – Sukhwinder Singh for “Jolly LLB 2”
- Best Music Director – Rohit Sharma for “Anaarkali of Aarah”
- Best Debut Director – Avinash Das for “Anaarkali of Aarah”
- Best Debut Director – Shubhashish Bhutiani for “Mukti Bhawan”
- Best Supporting Actor Female – Seema Bhargava for “Bareilly Ki Barfi”
- Best Supporting Actor Male – Saurabh Shukla for “Jolly LLB 2”
- Special Jury Award – Taapsee Pannu, Kirti Kulhari, Andrea Tariang for “Pink”
- Best Actor Female – Swara Bhaskar for “Anaarkali of Aarah”
- Best Actor Male – Irrfan Khan for “Hindi Medium”
- Special Mention – Adil Hussain for “Mukti Bhawan”
- Special Mention – “Dhruva Padmakumar” for “A Billion Color Story (film)|A Billion Color Story”
- Best Director – Aniruddha Roy Chowdhury for “Pink”
- Cinema Of The Seller Awards
  - Gold – McCann Erickson for “Live Love Laugh Foundation - Dobara Poocho”
  - Silver – Taproot Dents for “Adidas – Odds”
  - Bronze – BBDO Worldwide for “Mirinda - Release the Pressure”
- Best Short Film – Slimane Bounia for “Burning (Celui Qui Brule)”
- Special Jury Award – Rahul Chittella for “Azaad”
- Special Jury Award – Saurabh Tyagi for “Mazjhabi Laddu”
- Best Foreign Feature Film – Goran Trenchovski for “Golden Five”
- Best Feature Film – Subhash Kapoor for “Jolly LLB 2”
- Special Jury Award – Zeca Brito for “Back to 97 (Em 97 Era Assim)”
- Special Mention – “Zeynep Sevi Yilmaz for “Purple Horizons”
- Rajnigandha Achievers Award – Nawazuddin Siddiqui
- Special Contribution to Cinematic Art – Pravin Bhatt
- Icon Of Indian Cinema – Shabana Azmi
