= Sanjay Amar =

Indian film director

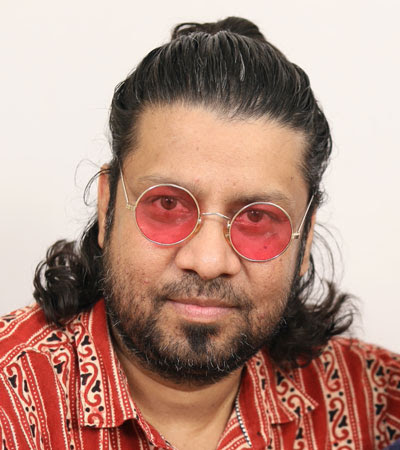
- Born: 18 February 1979 (age 47); Pallan, Kathua, Jammu and Kashmir, India
- Occupations: Film director; film producer; screenwriter; lyricist; cinematographer
- Years active: 2004-present
- Notable work: Lokshahi
- Spouse: Savita Singh Amar
- Children: 1

Sanjay Amar (born 18 February 1979) is an Indian film director, lyricist, writer and producer known for his works in Indian cinema. In 2012, he made his directorial debut with the film Future to Bright Hai Ji. He turned producer in the same year with the film Identity Card.

== Early life and career ==
After completing his bachelor's degree from Jammu University, Amar started his career in television production. He wrote, directed, and produced his first television documentary series for Doordarshan Srinagar in 2004. This was followed by his first fiction telefilm for Doordarshan Jammu in the Dogri language as a writer, director, and producer the next year. He then started making commercials, short films, and documentaries for Doordarshan and the J&K Government, eventually shifting his base to Mumbai in 2007. In 2009, Amar expanded his horizons internationally, working for the Dubai-based animation studio Arabic Broadcast Content (ABC), on the animated film Bo Mamo. He is the founder of Amar Chand Motion Pictures, under which he has been producing content-oriented films.

== Filmography ==
| Year | Film | Director | Writer | Producer | Actor | Additional Works | Language | Format |
|---|---|---|---|---|---|---|---|---|
| 2012 | Future To Bright Hai Ji | Yes | Yes | No | Yes | Cameo role | Hindi | Feature Film |
| 2012 | Love kiya aur lag gayi | No | Yes | No | No | Screenplay - Dialogues | Hindi | Feature Film |
| 2013 | Identity Card..ek lifeline | No | Yes | Yes | Yes | Cameo Role | Hindi | Feature Film |
| 2013 | Rabbi | No | Yes | Yes | No | | Hindi | Feature Film |
| 2014 | 19th January | Yes | Yes | Yes | No | Costume Stylist | Hindi | Feature Film |
| 2020 | Regards & Peace | Yes | Yes | Yes | No | Lyricist | Hindi | Feature Film |
| 2020 | Prabha ki Diary | Yes | Yes | Yes | No | Lyricist & Costume Stylist | Hindi | Web Series |
| 2020 | Parikrma- Discovering Indian Temples | No | Yes | Yes | No | Wrote a Few episodes of series. | Hindi | Documentary Series |
| 2023 | Deceptive Diva | Yes | Yes | Yes | No | Production Designer, Costume Stylist, Lyricist & Additional Cinematographer | Hindi | Feature Film |
| 2024 | Lokshahi | Yes | Yes | Yes | No | Production Designer & Lyricist | Marathi | Feature Film |
| 2024 | Har Ghar Jal Har Gaon Swacchta | Yes | Yes | Yes | No | | Multi Indian Languages | Travelogue Series |
| 2025 | Akashye Shatrun Jahi | Yes | No | Yes | No | Cinematographer | English & Hindi | Documentary Film |
| 2025 | Better Half Chi Love Story | Yes | Yes | Yes | No | Production Designer, Costume Stylist, Lyricist & Director of Photography | Marathi | Feature Film |
| 2026 | Bhagubai | Yes | Yes | Yes | No | Production Designer, Costume Stylist, Lyricist & Director of Photography | Marathi | Feature Film |
| TBA | Goggles Of Rajesh Khanna | Yes | Yes | Yes | Yes | Costume Stylist, Co-producer & Cameo Character | Hindi | Feature Film |
| TBA | Master Bhushan | Yes | Yes | Yes | Yes | Co-producer, Cameo character | Hindi | Feature Film |
