= Better Half Chi Love Story =

2025 Marathi-language film by Sanjay Amar

- Directed by: Sanjay Amar
- Written by: Sanjay Amar
- Produced by: Rajat Agrawal
- Starring: Subodh Bhave; Rinku Rajguru; Prarthana Behere
- Cinematography: Sanjay Amar
- Edited by: Prakash Jha
- Music by: Sajan Patel; Ameya Nare
- Production companies: Rajat Media & Entertainment
- Release date: 22 August 2025
- Running time: 108 minutes
- Country: India
- Language: Marathi

Better Half Chi Love Story is a 2025 Indian Marathi-language romantic comedy film written, cinematographed and directed by Sanjay Amar. The film stars Subodh Bhave, Rinku Rajguru, and Prarthana Behere in lead roles. It follows a widower whose life turns chaotic when his late wife's spirit possesses half his body, preventing him from moving on and falling in love again.

The film was released theatrically on 22 August 2025 and received mixed to negative reviews from critics.

== Plot ==
Ajay Patil, a successful copywriter, appears to lead a stable married life, but his relationship with his wife Sonia is strained by constant mistrust and conflict. Sonia is overly suspicious and controlling, particularly regarding Ajay's professional association with his boss, Mona Mondkar, whom she believes he has romantic feelings for. She also resents Ajay's close friendship with his best friend, Bhagwan Kale, further escalating tensions within the marriage.

The conflict reaches a tragic point when a heated argument between Ajay and Sonia leads to her accidental death. Believing himself freed from the oppressive relationship, Ajay attempts to move on with his life. However, his relief is short-lived when Sonia's vengeful spirit returns and possesses half of his body, preventing him from finding peace. As Ajay begins to develop feelings for Mona, he is forced to contend with the supernatural turmoil caused by Sonia's lingering presence, which continues to control his life even after death.

== Cast ==
- Subodh Bhave as Ajay Patil
- Rinku Rajguru as Sonia Patil
- Prarthana Behere as Mona Mondkar
- Aniket Vishwasrao as Bhagwan Kale
- Ganesh Yadav as Dhundiraj
- Akshaya Shetty as Kishori Kalsekar
- Satish Samudre as ACP Bhosle
- Aslam R. Wadkar as Sonia's Father
- Deepti Jadhav as Sonia's Mother
- Akshay Dandekar as Ritesh
- Kishor Chaugule as Police Inspector Mandar Phophale
- Ajitha Kulkarni as a Film Star

== Music ==
The film's soundtrack and background score were composed by Sajan Patel and Ameya Nare.

Track listing
No.	Title	Lyrics	Singer(s)	Length
1.	"Kaa Aaj Me"	Sanjay Amar	Harshavardhan Wavare	2:37
2.	"Tuch Aahe"	Sanjay Amar	Sonu Nigam	2:36
3.	"Paaltu Faaltu"	Sanjay Amar, Sajan Patel	Avadhoot Gupte	2:27
4.	"Na Kalale Kadhi Tula"	Sanjay Amar, Sajan Patel	Bela Shende, Harshavardhan Wavare	2:35
Total length:				10:15

== Release ==
=== Theatrical ===
Better Half Chi Love Story was released theatrically on 22 August 2025 across Maharashtra.

=== Home media ===
The film premiered on the Ultra Jhakaas OTT platform on 19 September 2025 and was later made available for rent on Amazon Prime Video.

== Reception ==
Anub George of The Times of India wrote, “Better Half Chi Love Story is a fun plot that suffers from shoddy execution,” and rated the film 2 out of 5 stars. A reviewer from Film Information criticised the film, stating that “Sanjay Amar has written a story and screenplay, which lack conviction.”

Anupama Gunde of Pudhari says that the actors deliver strong performances, especially Subodh Bhave and Rinku Rajguru, and that this film is worth watching as it helps strengthen the emotional bond between husband and wife.
