= The Tashkent Files =

2019 Indian conspiracy politicial thriller film by Vivek Agnihotri

- Theatrical release poster
- Directed by: Vivek Agnihotri
- Written by: Vivek Agnihotri
- Screenplay by: Vivek Agnihotri
- Produced by: Haresh Patel; Pranay Chokshi; Anuya Chauhan Kudecha; Vivek Agnihotri; Ritesh Kudecha; Sharad Patel
- Starring: Mithun Chakraborty; Naseeruddin Shah; Shweta Basu Prasad; Pankaj Tripathi; Mandira Bedi; Pallavi Joshi; Rajesh Sharma
- Cinematography: Udaysingh Mohite
- Edited by: Sattyajit Gazmer
- Music by: Songs: Rohit Sharma; Score: Satya Manik Afsar
- Production companies: SP Cinecorp; Vivek Agnihotri Creates
- Distributed by: Zee Studios
- Release date: 12 April 2019
- Running time: 144 minutes
- Country: India
- Language: Hindi
- Budget: ₹7.5 crore
- Box office: est. ₹20.84 crore

The Tashkent Files is a 2019 Indian Hindi-language conspiracy politicial thriller propaganda film written and directed by Vivek Agnihotri. It focuses on the mysterious death of former prime minister Lal Bahadur Shastri. It is the first installment in Agnihotri's The Files Trilogy, followed by The Kashmir Files (2022) and The Bengal Files (2025). The film received overwhelmingly negative reviews from critics.

== Plot ==
Raagini Phule, a struggling journalist, receives a tip from an anonymous caller about investigating the suspicious circumstances surrounding Prime Minister Lal Bahadur Shastri's death in Tashkent in 1966. Under government pressure, a panel of experts is formed, including Raagini herself, to examine the evidence.

The panel members, including politicians, historians, scientists, and journalists, fiercely debate the available material, drawing upon conspiracy theories, Cold War politics, and allegations of assassination. Ultimately, the film leaves the central mystery unresolved, raising questions about transparency and accountability in independent India.

== Cast ==
- Mithun Chakraborty as Shyam Sunder Tripathi / The Unknown Caller
- Naseeruddin Shah as PKR Natrajan
- Shweta Basu Prasad as Raagini Phule
- Mandira Bedi as Indira Joseph Roy
- Pallavi Joshi as Aiysha Ali Shah
- Rajesh Sharma as Omkar Kashyap
- Vinay Pathak as Mukhtar
- Pankaj Tripathi as Gangaram Jha
- Vishwa Mohan Badola as Justice Kurian Abraham
- Asif Basra as News Channel Editor
- Prakash Belawadi as GK Ananthasuresh
- Achint Kaur as Mrs. Natarajan
- Yusuf Hussain as Mr. Bakshi
- Prashant Gupta as Vishvendra Pratap Singh Rana
- Ankur Rathee as Imran Qureshi
- Francisco Raymond as Vasili Nikitich Mitrokhin
- Kaushik Chakraborty as R. N. Chug
- Alina Bejenaru as E. G. Yeremenko

== Production ==
The film was announced in January 2018 as India's first "crowd-sourced" thriller, with director Vivek Agnihotri inviting the public to share material related to Shastri’s death. Books referenced include Political Mysteries by K. R. Malkani, Conversations with the Crow by Gregory Douglas, and the Mitrokhin Archive by Vasili Mitrokhin.

=== Marketing and release ===
The first poster was released on 19 March 2019, announcing a 12 April 2019 theatrical release. The film was also made available on ZEE5. Agnihotri described it as the first installment of his trilogy of "untold stories of independent India," followed by The Kashmir Files (2022) and The Bengal Files (2025).

== Soundtrack ==
The Tashkent Files

Soundtrack album by Rohit Sharma
- Released: 30 April 2019
- Genre: Feature film soundtrack
- Length: 19:03
- Label: Zee Music Company
External audio
- Audio jukebox on YouTube

The soundtrack was composed by Rohit Sharma, with lyrics by Aazad, Sharma, and Vivek Agnihotri.

Track listing
No.	Title	Lyrics	Singer(s)	Length
1.	"Saare Jahan Se Acchha"	Rohit Sharma, Vivek Agnihotri	Jayaraman Mohan, Arya Acharya, RJ Archana, RJ Anuraag Pandey, RJ Rohini, Ekdant Kalakshetra, Swara Sharma, Nyonishi Cousins	3:42
2.	"Radha Tori Batiyaan Thumri"	Aazad	Ritesh Rajnish Mishra	3:42
3.	"Thumri Jugalbandi Rock"	Aazad	Ritesh Rajnish Mishra, Geet Sagar	3:14
4.	"Sab Chalta Hai Rock"	Rohit Sharma, Aazad	Geet Sagar	3:50
5.	"Sab Chalta Hai Electronica"	Aazad	Rohit Sharma	2:18
6.	"Sach Chalta Hai"	Aazad, Rohit Sharma	Geet Sagar	2:17
Total length:				19:03

== Reception ==
=== Critical response ===
The Tashkent Files received overwhelmingly negative reviews. On review aggregator Rotten Tomatoes, the film holds a 0% approval rating based on 8 reviews.

Devesh Sharma of Filmfare gave two and half stars out of five; it was a 'melodramatic' episode with loud and over the top acting coupled with bombastic dialogues. Sharma found the film to be biased against a certain political party and wondered about its release during the national elections, which were running concurrently.

Writing for Scroll.in, Nandini Ramnath found it to be a politically motivated work that did not have any rigor and failed to be an effective conspiracy thriller. Saibal Chatterjee, writing for NDTV rated the film with half star out of five — the research that went into the production was equivalent of a Google search film-making and overall, it was "junk." Jyoti Sharma Bawa, reviewing for the Hindustan Times rated it one out of five stars and reiterated Chatterjee. Mid-Day gave one and a half stars out of five — all the research that went into the work was derived from internet, esp. social media.

A review over India Today rated it one out of five stars and noted it to be a politically motivated film that did not have any logic and might be easily dispensed with. A review over The Hindu noted it to be an ideological slideshow that exploited Shastri's death to attack left, secular and socialist ideologies and institutions and though based on an engaging topic, was a 'hotch-potch of hearsay, juvenile arguments' that ultimately lend to utter confusion rather than any conviction. Another review over News18 India rated it one out of five stars and noted it to be a politically motivated film with unconvincing arguments, that made for a dull watch.

A review in The First Post asserted it to be a politically motivated film and rated it two out of five stars. Noting Agnihotri to neither have the finesse nor the potency to sketch a conspiracy thriller, the reviewer deemed it to be a cheap trick, that was high on hysteria but lacked logic amidst a focus-less frenzied storytelling that did not venture beyond the realms of Google. A review in The Indian Express deemed it to be the ideal politically-motivated fiction for the 'post-truth, fake news era' — a series of eye-roll moments with unintentionally hilarious dialogues. ThePrint found it to be a shoddy jab at film-making that harnessed a mish-mash of unformed characters and incomplete plots devoid of logic. Bollywood Hungama gave one and a half stars out of five.

Anusha Iyengar, reviewing for Times Now, gave two out of five stars, praising the story but taking issues with over-the-top dramatization that reeked of amateurish storytelling. Manavi Kapur, reviewing the film at Business Standard, found it unworthy for even a daytime opera slot. Shilajit Mitra, reviewing for The New Indian Express remarked it to be an exhausting head-spin of a political propaganda, that became weirder with time. Stutee Ghosh of The Quint found it to be a prejudiced, amateurish and cringe-worthy film with an uninspiring storytelling that banked on crowd-sourced research; she rated one star out of five.

=== Box office ===
Despite critical reception, the film performed strongly at the box office, completing 100 days in theatres.

== Accolades ==
Year	Award	Category	Recipient(s)	Result	Ref.
2021	National Film Awards	Best Supporting Actress	Pallavi Joshi	Won	
2021	National Film Awards	Best Dialogues	Vivek Agnihotri	Won	

== Adaptation ==
Who Killed Shastri?: The Tashkent Files is a non-fiction book by Vivek Agnihotri based on his research for the film. It was published in August 2020 by Bloomsbury India.
