= Madhuri Bhatia =

Indian actress

- Born: New Delhi, India
- Occupation: Actress
- Years active: 1991–present

Madhuri Bhatia (born 19 October 1930) is an Indian-born Canadian actress known for her works in Hindi cinema, English language films, and television. Madhuri Bhatia is a voice artist, choreographer, dancer, and novelist.

== Early life ==
Madhuri Bhatia was born on 19 October 1930 in New Delhi, India into a Punjabi family, and later migrated to Canada. She studied at the Jesus and Mary High School in Delhi. She attained B.A. in history from Miranda House, and B.P.A. Performing Arts., General Studies. History. Art/Art Studies from the Shriram Bharatiya Kala Kendra in Delhi.

== Awards ==
Association of Voicing Artists

- Best Dubbing Artist Animation Lead Female

== Selected filmography ==
As actress

Year	Title	Role	Language	Notes	Ref.
1991	Masala	Bibi Solanki	Hindi		
1993	The Mummy Lives		English	Voiceover	
1997	Pardes	Neeta Sandiplal	Hindi		
1998	My Father's Shadow: The Sam Sheppard Story	Cayahoga County Coroner	English		
2006	My Bollywood Bride	Mrs. Khanna	English		
2006	The Morning Fog	Maya	English	Short film	
2010	Kites	Mrs. B. Grover	Hindi		
2014	19th January	Senior NIA cop	Hindi		
2022	36 Farmhouse	Padmini Raj Singh	Hindi		
2025	War 2	Kali Head (Bangladesh)	Hindi		
2026	Last Man in Tower	Shelly Pinto	Hindi		

== Television ==
Year	Title	Role	Language	Notes	Ref.
1992	Forever Knight	Hotel maid	English		
1992	E.N.G.	Benajir Kafshi	English		
1993	Divorce Court	Delvecchio	English		
1998	Highlander: The Raven	Mrs. B. Grover	English		
1997-2001	Le Femme Nikita	Darius	English		
1999	The City	Mrs. Socialist	English		
2001	Relic Hunter	Dr. Hosni	English		
2003-2007	Kahin to hoga	Vasundara Raheja	Hindi		
2006-2007	Kuch Apne Kuch Paraye	Maya Raichand	Hindi		
