= Kirti Kulhari =

Indian actress (born 1985)

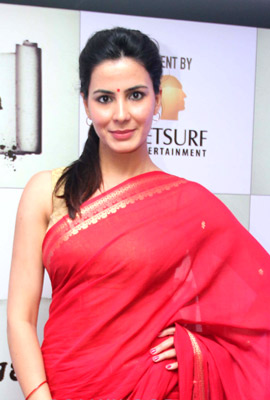
- Kulhari in 2014
- Born: 30 May 1985 (age 41); Bombay, Maharashtra, India
- Occupation: Actress
- Years active: 2009–present
- Spouse: Saahil Sehgal (m. 2016; sep. 2021)

Kirti Kulhari (born 30 May 1985) is an Indian actress who works in Hindi-language films and series. She made her acting debut with the film Khichdi: The Movie in 2010 and then starred in Shaitan in 2011. She then appeared in the films Jal (2013), Pink (2016), Indu Sarkar (2017), Uri: The Surgical Strike (2019), and Mission Mangal (2019). Kulhari has starred in several streaming series, which includes Four More Shots Please! (2019–present), Criminal Justice (2020) and Human (2022).

== Early and Personal life ==
Kulhari was born and brought up in Bombay (now Mumbai), Maharashtra. Her family hails from Jhunjhunu district in Rajasthan. Her father, Khyali Ram Kulhari was a Commander in the Indian Navy. Kulhari has three other siblings — two elder sisters (Sneha Kulhari and Shipra Kulhari) and her younger brother, Shivam Kulhari.

Kulhari married actor Saahil Sehgal in 2016. She announced separation from him on 1 April 2021.

== Acting career ==
=== Early career ===
Kulhari started her career in theatre and TV commercials. She did a one-month acting workshop with a Hindi theatre group called Yatri Theatre, under the direction and guidance of Om Katare. After that, She worked on three plays - Chinta Chhod Chintamani with Yatri Theatre, Shehenshah of Azeemo with AK Various Productions and a Hindi adaptation of Sakharam Binder with Yatri Theatre. Kulhari was the face of many television commercials – Lotus Mutual Funds, Travel Guru, Videocon Air Conditioners, Parachute Gorgeous Hamesha Campaign, ICICI Bank, Kaya Skin Clinic, Taj Mahal Tea, Everyuth Face Wash, Whirlpool Refrigerators, Spice Mobile, Virgin Mobiles, Close-up, JK White Cement and Tic Tac mouth freshener. For two years, Kulhari was the face of the beauty brand Nivea Visage Sparkling Glow's face. Kulhari was also a part of music videos – "Hik Vich Jaan" in the Desi Rockstar 2 album by Gippy Grewal.

Kulhari started her film acting career in Bollywood with Khichdi: The Movie, which released in October 2010. Kulhari was noticed as an actress for her second film, Shaitan, which released in June 2011.

=== Breakthrough (2016–present) ===
In 2016, she was seen in Pink with Tapsee Pannu and Amitabh Bacchan in which her performance was praised. The film was both commercially and critically successful and earned her a nomination for the Filmfare Award for Best Supporting Actress. In 2017, she appeared in the title role of Indu in Madhur Bhandarkar's political thriller film Indu Sarkar. In 2018, she starred in Blackmail with Irrfan Khan.

In 2019, she appeared in the role of an Indian Air Force officer Seerat Kaur in the commercially and critically successful military action film Uri: The Surgical Strike. The same year, she also appeared in the web television series Four More Shots Please! on Amazon Prime Video and Bard of Blood on Netflix. She acted in Mission Mangal (2019) a film based on India's Mars Orbiter Mission.

In 2020, Kulhari joined the cast of The Girl On The Train directed by Ribhu Dasgupta. It also features Parineeti Chopra, Aditi Rao Hydari, Avinash Tiwary, Sammy Jonas Heaney. Her performance was well received and earned her a second nomination for the Filmfare Award for Best Supporting Actress.

In 2022, Kulhari turned producer by launching production house Kintsukuroi Films and will star in its first project, a dark comedy thriller film Nayeka written and directed by Ajaykiran Nair.

As of April 2023, Kulhari has been shooting for Hisaab Barabar, co-starring with R. Madhavan.

== Filmography ==
=== Film ===
Year	Title	Role	Notes
2010	Khichdi: The Movie	Parminder	
2011	Shaitaan	Tanya Sharma	
2013	Sooper Se Ooper	Gulabo (Gul)	
2013	Rise of the Zombie	Vinny	
2014	Jal	Kesar	
2016	Cute Kameena	Avantika	
2016	Pink	Falak Ali	
2017	Indu Sarkar	Indu Sarkar	
2018	Blackmail	Reena Kaushal	
2019	Mission Mangal	Neha Siddiqui	
2019	Uri: The Surgical Strike	Flight Lieutenant Seerat Kaur	
2021	The Girl on the Train	Dalbir Kaur Bagga	Released on Netflix
2021	Shaadisthan	Sasha	Released on Disney Plus Hotstar
2023	Khichdi 2: Mission Paanthukistan	Parminder	
2024	Hisaab Barabar	Inspector Poonam Joshi	
2025	Badass Ravi Kumar	Laila	
2026	Dial 1975	Meena	

=== Web series ===
Year	Title	Role	Platform
2019–present	Four More Shots Please!	Anjana Menon	Amazon Prime Video
2019	Bard of Blood	Jannat	Netflix
2020	Criminal Justice: Behind Closed Doors	Anuradha Chandra	Disney Plus Hotstar
2022	Human	Dr. Saira Sabharwal	Disney Plus Hotstar
2024	Shekhar Home	Mumtaz Afsari	JioCinema

== Awards and nominations ==
Year	Award	Nominated work	Category	Result	Ref.
2017	Filmfare Awards	Pink	Best Supporting Actress	Nominated	
2019	Filmfare Awards	Maya	Best Actress in a Short Film	Won	
2022	Filmfare Awards	The Girl on the Train	Best Supporting Actress	Nominated	
2020	Filmfare OTT Awards	Four More Shots Please!	Best Actress in a Drama Series	Nominated	
2021	Filmfare OTT Awards	Criminal Justice: Behind Closed Doors	Best Actress in a Drama Series	Nominated	
2019	Indian Television Academy Awards	Four More Shots Please!	Best Actress - Web Series	Nominated	
2022	Indian Television Academy Awards	Criminal Justice: Behind Closed Doors	Best Actress - Drama (OTT)	Won	
2017	Jagran Film Festival	Pink	Special Jury Award	Won (Note: Tied with Taapsee Pannu and Andrea Tariang for the same film.)	
2012	Screen Awards	Shaitan	Best Ensemble Cast	Nominated	
2017	Screen Awards	Pink	Best Actress (Critics)	Nominated	
2018	Screen Awards	Indu Sarkar	Best Actress (Critics)	Nominated	
2012	Zee Cine Awards	Shaitan	Best Female Debut	Nominated	

== See also ==
- List of Indian film actresses
- List of people from Rajasthan
