= Manohar J. Pherwani =

Indian corporate executive and banker

Manohar Jethanand Pherwani (1934 – 21 May 1992) was an Indian corporate executive and banker who served as Chairman of the Unit Trust of India (UTI), National Housing Bank (NHB) and Infrastructure Leasing & Financial Services (IL&FS). Under his tenure of almost a decade as the chairman of UTI, the asset base of UTI grew from ₹1 billion to about ₹176.5 billion

In 1987, he set up IL&FS to finance infrastructure projects in the country. He headed the 1991 "Expert Study Group" into the establishment of a new stock exchange (also known as the MJ Pherwani Committee) which resulted in the formation of the National Stock Exchange of India (NSE).

== Controversies ==
In 1992, while serving as Chairman & Managing Director of the National Housing Bank, the bank's exposure of over ₹1,000 crore worth of re-purchase option (repo) based security trades to Harshad Mehta came to light. Pherwani had been regarded as Mehta's mentor. Consequently, Pherwani stepped down from NHB. He also quit as chairman of the NSE and IL&FS in the wake of the 1992 securities scam.

== Death ==
On 21 May 1992, less than 12 days after resigning as NHB chairperson Pherwani was found dead by his family members at his Bombay home. The cause of death was found to be cardiac arrest.

== In popular culture ==
Actor K. K. Raina portrayed Pherwani in the Sony LIV hit series Scam 1992.
