= Indu Sarkar =

- Directed by: Madhur Bhandarkar
- Written by: Madhur Bhandarkar
- Screenplay by: Madhur Bhandarkar; Anil Pandey; Sanjay Chhel (Dialogues)
- Story by: Madhur Bhandarkar
- Produced by: Bharat Shah; Madhur Bhandarkar
- Starring: Kirti Kulhari; Neil Nitin Mukesh; Supriya Vinod; Anupam Kher; Tota Roy Chowdhury
- Cinematography: Keiko Nakahara
- Edited by: Devendra Murdeshwar
- Music by: Anu Malik; Bappi Lahiri
- Production companies: Bhandarkar Entertainment; Mega Bollywood
- Release date: 28 July 2017
- Running time: 139 minutes
- Country: India
- Language: Hindi
- Budget: ₹120 million
- Box office: ₹60.70 million

Indu Sarkar is a 2017 Indian Hindi-language period political thriller film, co-written, co-produced and directed by Madhur Bhandarkar. The film is set in the emergency period in India, i.e. the 19-month-long period from 1975 to 1977, when there was a state of emergency across the country. It stars Kirti Kulhari, Neil Nitin Mukesh, Anupam Kher, Tota Roy Chowdhury, Supriya Vinod, Rashmi Jha, Sheeba Chaddha, and Manav Vij. The film's music is composed by Anu Malik and Bappi Lahiri. The film was released on 28 July 2017.

== Synopsis ==
During the emergency, Indu's husband, a government employee, plans to use the situation to his advantage and move ahead in his career. However, Indu's sense of morality sets her on a different path.

== Cast ==
- Kirti Kulhari as Indu Sarkar
- Neil Nitin Mukesh as Sanjay Gandhi
- Anupam Kher as Nanaji Pradhan
- Tota Roy Chowdhury as Navin Sarkar
- Supriya Vinod as Indira Gandhi
- Rashmi Thackeray as Farzana
- Sheeba Chaddha as Mekhla Singh
- Manav Vij as Inspector Sodhi
- Abhinav Sharma as Shreedhar
- Ankur Vikal as Shivam, an activist
- Varun Singh Rajput as Nihal
- Zakir Hussain as Inspector Mishra
- Mohan Kapoor as Sahani
- Parvin Dabas as Govardhab Singh, IRS Joint Director, IB
- Jashn Agnihotri as herself in the song "Yeh Pal" (special appearance) a commercial model who transitioned into acting after featuring in prominent national ad campaigns and major music videos, including Zee Music's 6 Ekkey alongside Shreyas Talpade.

== Production ==
Indu Sarkar includes a recreated version of Aziz Nazan's popular qawwali, Chadhta Sooraj Dheere Dheere Dhal Jaayega. Rashmi Jha was signed for the role of Farzana, which is inspired by socialite Rukhsana Sultana.

== Release ==
The film was released at around 825 screens across India.

== Reception ==
The film garnered mixed reviews from critics. Nitin Bhave of Times of India praised the film for its acting performances and gave the film 3 out of 5 stars. Rajeev Masand of News18 gave 2 stars by saying "This is at Best an Average Movie". Hindustan Times criticised the director's confused narrative by giving 2 stars. Giving 2 stars Indian Express also panned the film by saying "A watered-down, bloodless version of the Emergency".

== Controversy ==
The film generated controversy since the time its trailer got released up until it was shown in the theatres. Indian National Congress supporters heavily criticised the director Bhandarkar's attempt to portray former Prime Minister of India Mrs.Indira Gandhi and her son Sanjay Gandhi in a bad light. However, the director clarified that it was not a biopic on former Prime Minister Indira Gandhi under whose regime the Emergency was declared in the country in 1975. Sanjay Gandhi's alleged daughter Priya Singh Paul approached the Bombay High Court seeking a stay on the film. However, Bombay High Court rejected the plea after Paul failed to present solid evidence of her association with the lineage of Sanjay Gandhi. Just two days before the release Paul moved the Supreme Court seeking a stay on the release of the movie after Bombay High Court dismissed her plea. The Supreme Court also refused to stay the release of the film and quoted it as "The movie is an artistic expression within the parameters of law."

After the release of the film several supporters of the Indian National Congress protested and even tried to stall the screening. Congress workers created ruckus in front of a cinema hall in Indore. Police used canes to disperse those who came to blows.

== Box office ==
The film earned ₹8.50 million on its first day, as reported by Box office India.

== Soundtrack ==
Indu Sarkar

Soundtrack album by: Bappi-Anu
- Genres: EDM; Filmi
- Label: Saregama
- Producer: Bappi Lahiri

No.	Title	Singer(s)	Length
1.	"Yeh Awaz Hai"	Monali Thakur
2.	"Chadhta Suraj Dheere Dheere"	Anu Malik, Mujtaba Aziz Naza
3.	"Dilli Ki Raat"	Bappi Lahiri & Anmol Malik	3:57
