= K. K. Raina =

Indian actor

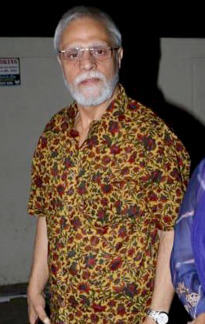
- Born: Srinagar, Jammu and Kashmir, India
- Education: National School of Drama
- Occupations: Actor; Script writer

K. K. Raina is an Indian film, television and theatre character actor and award-winning script writer, who is best known for his roles as Juror #8 in the 1986 film Ek Ruka Hua Faisla, a remake of 12 Angry Men, as Shivnath, the brother of Sunny Deol's character in Ghatak and as Byomkesh Bakshi's associate Ajit Kumar Banerji in the 1993 Doordarshan detective series Byomkesh Bakshi. Raina won the Filmfare Award for Best Dialogue in 1998 for the Rajkumar Santoshi film China Gate.

== Life and career ==
Raina was born in a Kashmiri family in Srinagar, Jammu and Kashmir, India. Raina is an alumnus of the National School of Drama, graduating college in 1976. He portrayed Manohar J. Pherwani in the Sony LIV series Scam 1992.

== Filmography ==
=== Actor ===
- Vijeta (1982) – Wilson
- Aadharshila (1982)
- Gandhi (1982) – Nehru's Friend
- Mandi (1983)
- Godam (1983) – Edekar
- Ardh Satya (1983)
- Tasveer Apni Apni (1984) – Employee
- Party (1984) – Bharat
- Aghaat (1985)
- Nasoor (1985) – Kamlesh Pai
- Trikal (1985) – Senor Lucio (Anna's father)
- Ek Ruka Hua Faisla (1986) – Juror #8
- Susman (1987)
- Mohre (1987) – Prakash Raikar
- Diksha (1991) – Shrikar Upadhyay
- Lifeline (1991) (TV series)
- Suraj Ka Satvan Ghoda (1993)
- Damini (1993) – Shekhar's friend
- Byomkesh Bakshi (1993) (TV series) – Ajit
- Ghatak: Lethal (1996) – Shiv Nath
- Dahek (1998) – Naseem Bahkshi
- Aks (2001) – Mahadevan Ghatge
- Bub (Father) (2001) – Shiban Lal
- Rang De Basanti (2006) – Politician
- Salaam-E-Ishq (2007)
- Dharm (2007) – Thakur
- Phoonk (2008) – Dr. Pandey
- Hijack (2008) – Rasheed Omar
- Delhi-6 (2009) – Haji Suleiman
- Rann (2010) – Prime Minister Digvijay Hooda
- Tanu Weds Manu (2011) – Kishan Sharma (Manu's father)
- Upanishad Ganga (2012–2013) (Doordarshan) (Various Characters)
- Bhaag Milkha Bhaag (2013) - Mr. Wadhwa
- D-Day (2013) - Gen. Razzak
- 19th January (2014) - Prof. Bashir Ahmed
- Zed Plus (2014) - Mr. Dixit
- Samvidhaan (2014) (TV series) - K.M. Munshi
- Tanu Weds Manu Returns (2015) - Kishan Sharma (Manu's father)
- Mirzya (2016) - Karan's father
- Shaadi Mein Zaroor Aana (2017) - Jugal Kishore Mishra (Sattu's father)
- Genius (2018) - Mr.Das
- Pati Patni Aur Woh (2019)
- Scam 1992 (2020) - Manohar J. Pherwani

=== Writer ===
- Ghatak: Lethal (1996) – associate screenplay
- China Gate (1998) – screenplay; dialogues
- Dahek (1998) – screenplay
- Pukar (2000) – dialogues
