= Lokshahi =

- Theatrical release poster
- Directed by: Sanjay Amar
- Written by: Sanjay Amar
- Produced by: Sushilkumar Agrawal
- Starring: Mohan Agashe; Tejashree Pradhan; Amit Riyaan; Girish Oak; Sameer Dharmadhikari; Shantanu Moghe; Bhargavi Chirmule
- Music by: Sanjay–Rajee
- Production company: Ultra Media & Entertainment
- Release date: 9 February 2024 (Maharashtra)
- Running time: 128 minutes
- Country: India
- Language: Marathi

Lokshahi (transl. Democracy) is a 2024 Indian Marathi-language drama film written and directed by Sanjay Amar and produced by Sushilkumar Agrawal. The film stars Mohan Agashe, Tejashree Pradhan, Amit Riyaan, Girish Oak, Sameer Dharmadhikari, Shantanu Moghe, Bhargavi Chirmule.

== Cast ==
- Mohan Agashe as Gajanan Chitre
- Tejashree Pradhan as Irawati
- Amit Riyaan as Sadashiv
- Girish Oak as Prakash
- Sameer Dharmadhikari as Yashwant Chitre
- Shantanu Moghe as Vishwas Ghadge
- Bhargavi Chirmule as Suhasini
- Sonal Waghmare as Rohini
- Ajita Kulkarni as Uma
- Ankit Mohan as Sridhar

== Plot ==
The story centers around the events that take place among the members of the Chitre family who have considerable political influence in the state of Maharashtra. Yashwant Chitre is an influential political leader in the state but there seems to be somebody who does not approve of his leadership skills. A conspiracy to eliminate Yashwant from this game of political chess is planned and the narrative expertly takes us through the process that eventually leads to the assassination of Yashwant Chitre, played by Sameer Dharmadhikari and its unravelling by his daughter Ira played by Tejashree Pradhan.

== Critical response ==
Sanjay Ghaware of Lokmat rated 3 stars out of 5, pointing out that while Lokshahi "attempts to explore political themes, it becomes entangled in dynastic politics rather than focusing solely on democratic principles. Anub George of The Times of India rated 2.5 stars out of 5 stars and wrote "A well-shot film that suffers due to bad editing." Jaydeep Pathakaji of Maharashtra Times rated 2 stars out of 5 and suggests that the film fails to fully captivate its audience due to these shortcomings. Jyoti Venkatesh of Cine Blitz rated 2 stars out of 5 stars and wrote "The film, to put it in a nutshell, sets out to shed light on the complexities of navigating political and social landscapes even while addressing a complex theme of social justice and reform."
