= The Kashmir Files =

2022 Indian film by Vivek Agnihotri

- Theatrical release poster
- Directed by: Vivek Agnihotri
- Written by: Vivek Agnihotri; Saurabh M. Pandey
- Produced by: Tej Narayan Agarwal; Abhishek Agarwal; Pallavi Joshi; Vivek Agnihotri
- Starring: Mithun Chakraborty; Anupam Kher; Darshan Kumar; Pallavi Joshi; Chinmay Mandlekar; Bhasha Sumbli
- Cinematography: Udaysingh Mohite
- Edited by: Shankh Rajadhyaksha
- Music by: Rohit Sharma
- Production companies: Zee Studios; Abhishek Agarwal Arts; I am Buddha Production
- Distributed by: Zee Studios
- Release date: 11 March 2022
- Running time: 170 minutes
- Country: India
- Languages: Hindi; Kashmiri
- Budget: ₹15−25 crore
- Box office: est. ₹340.92 crore

The Kashmir Files is a 2022 Indian Hindi-language drama film written and directed by Vivek Agnihotri. The film presents a fictional storyline centred around the 1990 exodus of Kashmiri Hindus from the Kashmir Valley in Indian-administered Kashmir. It depicts the exodus and the events leading up to it (Note: The exodus followed the rise of violence in an insurgency in Jammu and Kashmir) as a genocide, a framing considered inaccurate by scholars. The film claims that such facts were suppressed by a conspiracy of silence.

The Kashmir Files stars Mithun Chakraborty, Anupam Kher, Darshan Kumar, and Pallavi Joshi. The plot follows a Kashmiri Hindu college student, raised by his exiled grandfather and shielded from the knowledge of the circumstances of the death of his parents. After his grandfather's death, the student, who had come to believe at college that the exodus was benign, becomes driven to uncover the facts of his family's deaths. The plot alternates between the student's quest in the present time, 2020, and his family's travails of thirty years before. The film was released in theatres on 11 March 2022. It was a commercial success.

The Kashmir Files received mixed reviews upon release, with praise directed to its cinematography and the performances of the ensemble cast. However its storyline attracted criticism for attempting to recast established history and propagating Islamophobia. Supporters have praised the film for showing what they say is an overlooked aspect of Kashmir's history. Made on a production budget of approximately ₹15 crore (US$1.6 million) to ₹25 crore (US$2.6 million) the film grossed ₹340.92 crore (US$35 million) worldwide, becoming the third highest-grossing Hindi film of 2022.

At the 69th National Film Awards, The Kashmir Files won 2 awards – Best Feature Film on National Integration and Best Supporting Actress (Joshi). At the 68th Filmfare Awards, the film received 7 nominations, including Best Film, Best Director (Agnihotri), Best Actor (Kher) and Best Supporting Actor (Kumar and Chakraborty).

== Plot ==
The plot frequently switches between the contemporary period set in the year 2020 and flashbacks to 1989–1990 throughout the film.

Circa 1989–1990

In 1989–90 Kashmir, Islamic militants storm and banish Kashmiri Pandits from the Kashmir valley using the slogans Raliv, Chaliv ya Galiv ("convert (to Islam), leave or die") and Al-Safa Batte Dafa ("with god's grace whole Kashmiri Pandit community will leave valley"). Pushkar Nath Pandit, a teacher, fears for the safety of his son Karan, who has been accused by the militants of being an Indian spy. Pushkar requests his friend Brahma Dutt, a civil servant, for Karan's protection. Brahma travels with Pushkar to Kashmir and witnesses the violence against Kashmiri Pandits. He takes up the issue with the chief minister of Jammu and Kashmir (J&K), who suspends Brahma.

Militant commander Farooq Malik Bitta, also a former student of Pushkar, breaches Pushkar Nath's house. Karan hides in a rice container but is found and shot by Bitta. Pushkar and his daughter-in-law Sharda plead for their lives. Bitta compels Sharda to eat rice soaked in Karan's blood in exchange for their lives. After Bitta and his gang leave the house, Pushkar begs his doctor friend Mahesh Kumar to bring an ambulance and save Karan's life. However, the hospital gets taken over by militants, who forbid the hospital staff from treating non-Muslims. Subsequently, Karan succumbs to injuries from the gunshots.

To ensure their safety, Pushkar and his family are taken by their journalist friend Vishnu Ram to Kaul, a Hindu poet who maintains a cordial relationship with Muslims. Kaul takes in many Pandits into his home but a group of militants arrives to pick Kaul and his son up under the guise of offering protection. The rest of the Pandits leave the place but are later shocked to find corpses of Kaul and his son hanging from trees.

The refugee Pandits from the Kashmir valley settle in Jammu and live on meagre ration and in poor conditions. Brahma is appointed as an advisor to the new Governor of J&K. At his request, the Home Minister visits the Jammu camps where Pushkar demands the removal of Article 370 and the resettlement of Kashmiri Pandits. Brahma manages to get Sharda a government job in Nadimarg in Kashmir, and the family moves there.

One day, a group of militants headed by Bitta dress up as members of the Indian Army and arrive at Nadimarg. They start rounding up the Pandits living there. Sharda resists when the militants get hold of her elder son Shiva. Angry Farooq strips her and saws her body in half. He lines up Shiva and the remaining Pandits and shoots them into a mass grave. Pushkar is spared to spread the word about what happened.

2020

In the present day, Sharda's younger son Krishna is brought up by Pushkar. He believes that his parents had died in an accident. A student of ANU, (Note: In India, reference to JNU has been changed to ANU following the directions of Central Board of Film Certification. In an interview with Lallantop on 16 March 2022, Vivek Agnihotri mentioned that the name of the university has been retained as JNU in the international print of the movie.) Krishna is under the influence of professor Radhika Menon who is a supporter of Kashmiri separatism. Pushkar's friends Brahma, Vishnu, Mahesh, and police officer Hari Narain, who had served in Kashmir when Karan was killed, recall the events of Kashmir from their memory that Brahma calls a "genocide".

Krishna contests the ANU's student election. Following the advice of professor Radhika Menon, he holds the Government of India responsible for the issue of Kashmir, much to the anger of Pushkar. Later, when Pushkar dies, Krishna travels to his ancestral home in Kashmir to scatter the ashes per Pushkar's last wish. Menon asks Krishna to record some footage in Kashmir to expose the government's supposed atrocities. With the help of one of Menon's contacts, Krishna meets Bitta and accuses him of being responsible for the situation of the Pandits. But Bitta declares himself to be a new-age Gandhi who is leading a non-violent democratic movement. Bitta claims that it was the Indian Army, who killed Krishna's mother and brother. When Krishna questions Brahma about this claim, Brahma hands him files of newspaper cuttings (collected by Pushkar), reporting that militants, disguised as Indian Army soldiers, had killed them.

Krishna returns to Delhi and gives his scheduled speech for the university presidential elections to a roaring crowd at the ANU campus. He elaborates on the history of Kashmir and the plight of his family and other Kashmiri Hindu victims that he had discovered from his visit. This shocks his mentor professor Menon and her other students, and Krishna is initially met with resistance and ridicule at the meeting. Some students eventually welcome and applaud Krishna's speech.

== Cast ==
- Mithun Chakraborty as IAS Brahma Dutt
- Anupam Kher as Pushkar Nath Pandit
- Darshan Kumar as Krishna Pandit
  - Kunj Gosai as young Krishna
- Pallavi Joshi as Radhika Menon
- Chinmay Mandlekar as Farooq Malik Bitta
- Prakash Belawadi as Dr. Mahesh Kumar
- Puneet Issar as DGP Hari Narain
- Amaan Iqbal as Karan Pandit
- Bhasha Sumbli as Sharda Pandit
- Mrinal Kulkarni as Laxmi Dutt
- Atul Srivastava as Journalist Vishnu Ram
- Amit Behl as Chief Minister of Jammu and Kashmir (based on Farooq Abdullah)
- Prithviraj Sarnaik as Shiva Pandit
- Vrinda Kher as Bhavani
- Anchal Dwivedi as Durga
- Rafiq Ahmed Khan as Abdul
  - Tanmay Lohani as young Abdul
- KK Raina as Sarwanand Koul Premi
- Akarsh Rayu as Verinder, Premi's son
- Atul Vishnoi as Home Minister (based on Mufti Mohammad Sayeed)
- Naveen Gairola as Squadron Leader Ravi Khanna

== Production ==
On 14 August 2019, Agnihotri announced the film with its first look poster with an intent to release it on 15 August 2020, coinciding with India's Independence Day. The subject of the film was the exodus of Kashmiri Pandits that took place between the late 80s and early 90s. Agnihotri touted the film to be the second instalment of his trilogy of "untold stories of independent India", which includes the films The Tashkent Files (2019) and an upcoming The Delhi Files. As a part of the production, Agnihotri claimed to have interviewed more than 700 emigrants from the exodus and recorded their stories over a period of two years. Actor Anupam Kher joined the cast as the lead actor of the film in December 2019.

The first schedule of the film, supposed to take place in March 2020, was called off due the COVID-19 pandemic in India, and was started later the same year in December in Mussoorie. The entire film was shot in 30 days, largely in Mussoorie and Dehradun, along with a week-long shooting schedule in Kashmir, including at Dal Lake. Yograj Singh was removed before the production started in December 2020 for his speeches at the 2020–2021 Indian farmers' protest, and Puneet Issar was brought in as the replacement. A line producer, Sarahna died during the production by suicide. The production was wrapped up by 16 January 2021.

Produced by Tej Narayan Agarwal, Abhishek Agarwal, Pallavi Joshi and Vivek Agnihotri under the banners of Zee Studios, IAmBuddha and Abhishek Agarwal Arts, the film was made on a budget of approximately ₹15 crore (US$1.6 million) to ₹25 crore (US$2.6 million).

== Soundtrack ==
The Kashmir Files

Soundtrack album by Rohit Sharma and Swapnil Bandodkar
- Released: 19 April 2022
- Genre: Feature film soundtrack
- Length: 34:59
- Language: Hindi
- Label: Zee Music Company

Official audio
- The Kashmir Files - Full Album on YouTube

The music of the film is composed by Rohit Sharma and Swapnil Bandodkar.

Track listing
No.	Title	Lyrics	Music	Singer(s)	Length
1.	"Theme From The Kashmir Files"	Instrumental	Rohit Sharma	Instrumental	4:40
2.	"Al Jihad"	Instrumental	Rohit Sharma	Instrumental	0:55
3.	"Brahma Dutt's Theme"	Instrumental	Rohit Sharma	Instrumental	4:13
4.	"Azadi"	Instrumental	Rohit Sharma	Instrumental	1:04
5.	"Krishna's Theme"	Instrumental	Rohit Sharma	Instrumental	2:08
6.	"Raliv, Galiv Ya Chaliv"	Instrumental	Rohit Sharma	Instrumental	2:12
7.	"Hum Dekhenge" (Unplugged Version)	Faiz Ahmad Faiz	Swapnil Bandodkar	Pallavi Joshi	1:38
8.	"Hum Dekhenge"	Faiz Ahmad Faiz	Swapnil Bandodkar	Swapnil Bandodkar, Pallavi Joshi, Shahzad Ali, Salman Ali, Meghna Mishra, Ananya Wadkar	3:41
9.	"Hum Dekhenge" (Extended Version)	Faiz Ahmad Faiz	Swapnil Bandodkar	Swapnil Bandodkar, Pallavi Joshi, Shahzad Ali, Salman Ali, Meghna Mishra, Ananya Wadkar	2:06
10.	"Roshey"	Traditional	Traditional	Noor Mohammad	8:25
11.	"Krishna's Speech"	Traditional	Rohit Sharma	Noor Mohammad	1:27
12.	"Death Of Sharda"	Instrumental	Rohit Sharma	Instrumental	1:24
13.	"The Kashmir Files Title Theme"	Instrumental	Rohit Sharma	Instrumental	1:06
Total length:					34:59

== Release ==
=== Certification ===
The Indian Censor board (CBFC) gave The Kashmir Files A certificate, which is restricted to adults (aged 18 and above). According to CBFC, it is a feature film in the genre 'drama' and there is no mention of the film being commercial/documentary in the CBFC records.

In the United Kingdom, the British Board of Film Classification (BBFC) passed the film uncut with a 15 classification on 9 March 2022 for ‘strong bloody violence, threat, brief scene of sexual humiliation’.

Australian censors gave the film an 18+ plus rating.

In New Zealand, the censorship clearance was mired in controversy. The film had originally received an R16 classification from the New Zealand Classification Office. However, with the Muslim community raising concerns about potential incitement of Islamophobia, the rating was raised to R18; David Shanks, the Chief Censor of New Zealand, highlighted "the nature and intensity of the violence and cruelty depicted" and defended the new age restriction to be in consistence with Australia and India. Leader of the New Zealand First party Winston Peters accused the Classification Office of censoring the film based on its political content, and was supported by other politicians.

In Singapore, the film was banned by the censor authority after a consultation with the Ministry of Culture, Community and Youth and the Ministry of Home Affairs; the film's "provocative and one-sided portrayal of Muslims" was held to have the potential of disrupting "social cohesion and religious harmony". The ban has been argued as a strong-handed way of protecting the country's secularism, an approach of pre-emptive actions that the People's Action Party, the governing party of Singapore, has long been undertaking to maintain racial and religious societal harmony.

=== Litigations ===
A public interest litigation (PIL) was filed by an Uttar Pradesh resident which sought a stay on the film's release on grounds that the film may portray the Muslims as killers of the Kashmiri Pandits, presenting what it described as a one-sided view that would hurt the sentiments of Muslims and could trigger violence against Muslims. The PIL was dismissed by the Bombay High Court on grounds that the filer should have challenged the certificate issued to the film by the Central Board of Film Certification. Another lawsuit was filed by the widow of an Indian Armed Forces squadron leader who died during the Kashmir Insurgency. The widow's lawsuit said that the film portrayed a false depiction of events related to her husband and sought a stay on its release. Accordingly, the court restrained the makers from showing the relevant scenes. In addition, miscellaneous petitions were filed in various courts to stop the screening on the potential of promoting communal enmity.

=== Theatrical release ===
The Kashmir Files was set to release theatrically worldwide on 26 January 2022, coinciding with India's Republic Day, but was postponed due to the spread of the Omicron variant of COVID-19. It was initially released in over 630 screens in India on 11 March 2022 and was later increased to 4,000 screens. The film was re-released on 19 January 2023.

=== Home media ===
The film was premiered for worldwide streaming on ZEE5 from 13 May 2022, in Hindi, Tamil, Telugu, Kannada and Indian Sign Language. With this film, ZEE5 became the first OTT platform to release a commercial Bollywood film with an interpretation in the Indian Sign Language. The film also recorded the highest number of views for ZEE5 during its opening weekend and the first week at more than 6 million and 9 million views respectively.

== Government and ruling party support ==
The ruling Bharatiya Janata Party (BJP) has endorsed and promoted the film in explicit terms, which has led to significant audience at theatres making it a runaway commercial success. Union Minister Smriti Irani was one of the most vocal in promoting it. Prime Minister Narendra Modi has attacked critics in response to negative reviews, claiming that there is a conspiracy to discredit the film, which according to him "reveals the truth"; he met with Agnihotri to congratulate him, as did Home Minister Amit Shah. The BJP Information and Technology Cell, known for being the party's propaganda unit promoted the film with its head raising calls for people to watch it. Pro-government media were also involved in its promotion; OpIndia — a pro-Hindutva news portal — published several articles raining praises on the film and questioning the motives of critics as well as opposition parties while television channels hosted multiple shows and debates to the same ends. Following the release of the film, Agnihotri was provided with a Y-category security detail from the Central Reserve Police Force by the Ministry of Home Affairs, based on what an official described as inputs of perceived threat to the director's safety.

States in which film was tax-free.

The film was declared tax-free in multiple BJP governed states—Goa, Gujarat, Haryana, Karnataka, Madhya Pradesh, Tripura, Uttar Pradesh, Uttarakhand, Bihar and Himachal Pradesh—with calls by several chief ministers and Members of Parliament for "everyone to watch the film". Assam and Madhya Pradesh granted vacations to government employees and police personnel respectively, if they planned to watch the film; Assam, Karnataka and Tripura governments held special screenings of the film. In addition, in the states of Chhattisgarh, Maharashtra and West Bengal, which have opposition parties in power, BJP legislators have called for their respective state governments to make the film tax-free. Across the country, BJP legislators have bought out screens for audiences to watch the film for free.

== Reception ==
=== Critical reception ===
On the review aggregator website Rotten Tomatoes, 40% of 5 critics' reviews are positive.

Jagadish Angadi of Deccan Herald rated the film 4 out of 5 stars and was effusive in his praise — Agnihotri's use of non-linear narratives and strong dialogues, enviable background research, and strong individual performances produced an "intense watch". Aditi Sharma for Zee News rated the film 3.5 stars out of 5 and wrote "Lending a voice to broken souls" and that the film was based on actual incidents narrated from a Kashmiri Pandit point of view; showcasing the plight of Kashmiri Pandits with all its grime and gore. Stutee Ghosh, reviewing for The Quint, rated the film 3.5 out of 5 and found the film to have made a compelling case for Kashmiri pandits and their "hitherto unaddressed wounds" but wished for more nuance; the cinematography (especially the colour palette), Anupam Kher's acting, and realist depictions were praised in particular.

Avinash Lohana of Pinkvilla rated the film 3 out of 5 stars, praising the cast performances—particularly that of Kher—and the behind-the-scenes research, but criticised the lack of balance. Rohit Bhatnagar of The Free Press Journal found the screenplay and the individual performances to be sloppy, thus failing to make any mark; however, he admired the effort that went behind the film and rated it 2.5 out of 5 stars.

Shubhra Gupta reviewing for The Indian Express rated the film 1.5 out of 5 stars, criticising the film for being uninterested in nuance and describing the film as propaganda aligned with the ruling party, that aimed to stoke the "deep-seated anger" of Pandits. However, she also stated that the film did tap "into the grief of the displaced Pandits," and commended Kher's performance.Shilajit Mitra of The New Indian Express panned the film with a rating of 1 out of 5 stars and castigated Agnihotri for exploiting the suffering of Kashmiri Pandits by doing away with all nuance in service of a "communal agenda". Suparna Sharma, reviewing for Rolling Stone India, panned the film with a rating of 1 out of 5 stars: "neither cinematic nor historical", Agnihotri simply attempted to weaponize the tragedy of Kashmiri Pandits in pandering to the current sociopolitical climate. Uninterested in nuance and context, dripping with gore, and pushing an overt pro-right agenda, it was not even well made propaganda.

Rahul Desai reviewing for Film Companion, found the work to be a "fantasy-revisionist" rant lacking in clarity, craft, and sense where every Muslim was a Nazi and every Hindu, a Jew; with an unconvincing screenplay and weak characters, it was propaganda that strove only to tune in with the Hindu nationalist mood of the nation rather than offer any genuine empathy to the displaced victims. Tanul Thakur, reviewing for The Wire, was scathing: the film—"monotonous", "inert", and featuring an "objectively poor screenplay"—was set up in an alternate reality and felt like iterations of collected WhatsApp screeds in service of a Hindu majoritarian state and especially Narendra Modi; Agnihotri lured the audience with facts only to distort and communalize them, and target those who are critical of the incumbent political government in India. Asim Ali, reviewing for Newslaundry, was also critical of the film, finding it to have exploited the sufferings of Kashmiri Pandits in peddling a Hindu Nationalist worldview where no Muslim in Kashmir had any aspiration except persecuting Hindus.

Writing for The Outlook Magazine, Ashutosh Bharadwaj noted the film to be deeply insensitive to Muslim claims and memories concerning the exodus; it bore evidence of India's refashioning into a Hindu majoritarian state. Anuj Kumar reviewing for The Hindu described the film as being composed of "some facts, some half-truths, and plenty of distortions" with brutally intense visualisations and compelling performances, aimed at inciting hatred against Muslims.

Debasish Roy Chowdhury, co-author of To Kill a Democracy: India's Passage to Despotism, found the film to be a prominent marker of India's "descent into darkness"; rather than offering genuine closure for the Pandits, Agnihotri inflamed hatred against Muslims, secular parties, and liberal media in pursuance of a Hindu Supremacist cause. Nitasha Kaul, a Kashmiri Pandit academic, reviewing for The News Minute, held the work to be a communal and masculinist propaganda that collapsed the complex politics of Kashmir into a one-sided moral tale palatable to the current Hindutva dispensation in India; Agnihotri appropriated Pandit sufferings to portray all Kashmiri Muslims as barbarian invaders, undeserving of any solidarity. Alpana Kishore, one of the few journalists who had covered Kashmir in the 1990s (as part of Newstrack), found the film to be a set of factual episodes but strung together in a contextless fashion; Agnihotri did not bother to even portray the other side of the divide, and was brazen in pushing a pro-right agenda.

=== International Film Festival of India ===
The film was an entry at the 53rd International Film Festival of India, held in Goa in November 2022. Chosen for screening at the Indian Panorama section, it failed to win any award and sparked adverse reaction from the jury.

Nadav Lapid, the chief juror, assessing the submissions in a closing speech, singled out the film for pointed criticism: it was "vulgar propaganda", he said, and an "inappropriate [submission]", which had shocked his fellow jury members. In subsequent interviews, Lapid doubled down, highlighting how every single minute of the film could be used as case-exhibits for cinematic propaganda in film studies. Faced with opposition from the Hindu Right, who accused Lapid of denying the exodus of Kashmiri Hindus, he emphasized that the film was not equivalent to the tragedy. Days later, Lapid's fellow jurors — Pascal Chavance, Jinko Gotoh, Sudipto Sen, and Javier Angulo Barturen — came out in support of Lapid's observations; Chavance, in particular, noted how the monolithic caricaturish portrayal of Muslims gave away the film's intentions.

=== Reception by Kashmiri Pandits ===
Reception among Pandits has been mixed with some regarding the film to be a cathartic experience while others have been critical. Journalist Rahul Pandita, who fled from Srinagar during the exodus, said that the experience for Pandits watching the film was like "an emotional catharsis." A Kashmiri Hindu immigrant to New Zealand told Stuff that The Kashmir Files was a good representation of the exodus, requesting that Muslims watch it to understand the other side of the conflict. President of the Kashmiri Pandit Sangharsh Samiti (KPSS) Sanjay Tickoo criticized the film for its misrepresentations and added that this film is making Kashmiri Pandits feel unsafe in the Kashmir Valley.

== Political messaging and historical accuracy ==
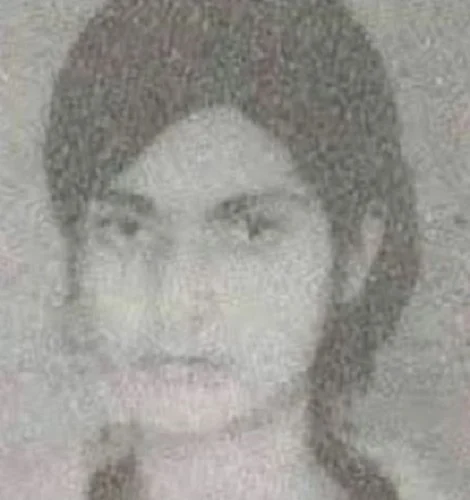
Girija Tickoo, whose June 1990 rape and murder with a mechanical saw by militants is depicted in the film

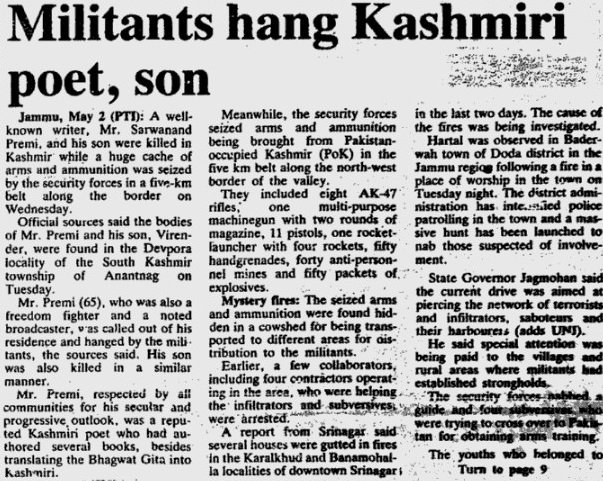
News report describing killings of Sarwanand Koul Premi and his son Virender Koul by militants in May 1990; the killings are depicted in the film

The film's director Vivek Agnihotri claims the film to be a depiction of the "truth of Kashmir", when "terrorism seep[ed] in and humanity [was] absent". Its key message — in line with Hindu Right views on the issue — is that what is known as the exodus of Kashmiri Pandits was actually a "genocide" which was kept out of history textbooks and mainstream discourse deliberately. This was achieved by selecting several horrific events known to have occurred over a period of a decade and half, and then depicting them as happening in the course of about a year to one single fictitious family – a "fictional take on real events", as one reviewer labelled it.

The killings of poet Sarwanand Koul Premi and his son Virender Koul by militants, which took place in 1990, are depicted in the film, while the killing of politician Tika Lal Taploo by militants at the outbreak of militancy is referenced in the film. The protagonist Krishna's father is killed in the film while hiding in a container of rice, an event fashioned after the killing of telecommunications engineer B. K. Ganjoo in 1990. But the additional portrayal of militants forcing his wife to eat the blood-soaked rice was rejected by Ganjoo's brother as 'fiction'; he emphasized that the family was never consulted while making the film. Krishna's mother is raped and killed by cutting her with a mechanical saw, an event fashioned after the rape and killing of Girija Tikoo, unrelated to Ganjoo, also in 1990. This event is juxtaposed in the film with a massacre fashioned after the 2003 Nadimarg massacre in an entirely different time frame under the watch of a Bharatiya Janata Party government. The massacre is depicted in the film as occurring in broad daylight in front of Kashmiri Muslim neighbours as passive participants, in contrast to the real event which happened in the dead of night with silenced guns and no witnesses. Sanjay Tikoo, the head of the Kashmiri Pandit Sangharsh Samiti, says, "that was not like that; ... no massacre of Kashmiri Pandits took place before [the eyes] of Kashmiri Muslims".

The film's exclusive focus on violence of Muslims on Hindus—with limited attention given to the overall history of human rights abuses in the state (Note: Kashmiri Muslims were also killed during the insurgency, and in greater numbers, often at the hands of Indian security apparatus. According to the Indian Home Ministry's internal data, 1,583 Hindu civilians were killed in the conflict between 1988 and 2005, while the Muslim civilians killed in the same period numbered 12,245.)—and especially, the painting of all Muslims as active or passive participants in the exodus has been seen as promoting Islamophobia and aiding a Hindu Nationalist cause. The film has also faced charges of historical revisionism and unnuanced storytelling. Several critics have compared Agnihotri with Leni Riefenstahl, a Nazi propagandist. Isaac Chotiner, interviewing Agnihotri for The New Yorker, summed up the work as an ahistorical exercise in "stigmatization and fearmongering". In response to accusations of propaganda, Agnihotri said: "How can a film on terrorism be propaganda?", adding that "The film is only against terrorism. I have not criticized Muslims." He also denied allegations that the film could create a divide between Hindus and Muslims, calling the allegations "agenda-driven".

The film depicts the Jawaharlal Nehru University as an unpatriotic institution sympathetic to terrorism. Article 370 of the Constitution, that granted nominally autonomous status to Jammu and Kashmir and was in effect during the time frame of the film, is named as one of the factors behind the displacement of Kashmiri Pandits. Blame is also attached to Farooq Abdullah, the chief minister of Jammu and Kashmir prior to the 1990 exodus; the former Indian prime minister Rajiv Gandhi; and Indian home minister Mufti Mohammad Sayeed, a person of Kashmiri heritage. The serving prime minister V. P. Singh (in 1990), and the Bharatiya Janata Party that supported his government, appear to be absolved of responsibility by the film. The central character Krishna Pandit is shown as being provoked by terrorists to turn against the present-day prime minister Narendra Modi. The former prime minister Atal Bihari Vajpayee is also subtly derided for attempting to win the hearts of Kashmiris.

A Kashmiri separatist militant named Farooq Malik Bitta is depicted in the film, fashioned after Farooq Ahmed Dar ("Bitta Karate") and Yasin Malik rolled into one. But he is also shown as being involved in the 2003 Nadimarg massacre, which was of neither's doing. The facts of Bitta Karate's long years of incarceration despite a lack of conviction or Malik's eventual conversion to non-violent means of struggle are not mentioned.

The film's central characters repeatedly blame an Indian National Congress-led government in Delhi for the Kashmir exodus while in reality the actual exodus took place during a coalition government supported by the BJP.

== Hate speech ==
At the theatres, Hindutva activists raised slogans advocating for fatal violence against Kashmiri Muslims as well as Indian Muslims in general. In one instance, calls were made to "[s]hoot the traitors to the nation" by members of the Hindu Jagran Manch, a member of the Sangh Parivar. Agnihotri has defended such cases, citing freedom of expression. In Jammu, a Kashmiri Pandit activist and his family were heckled by a mob of activists allegedly belonging to the BJP, for he had labelled the film exploitative of the Pandit community. Several videos that went viral on social media showed audience members calling for boycotts of Muslim-owned businesses. Indian Muslim journalist Rana Ayyub, felt humiliated and physically unsafe during a screening, and was yelled at by a man to go to Pakistan.

During the 2022 Ram Navami riots, The Kashmir Files is seen to have played a role in inspiring communal passions. In Khargone in Madhya Pradesh, the scene of a woman being cut up by a mechanical saw was recreated with makeshift devices and emblazoned with the slogan, "Wake up Hindus, lest other states in India become Kashmir." A BJP leader declared that, if Hindus did not draw the lesson from The Kashmir Files, eventually similar films would need to be made about Delhi, Bengal, Kerala and Khargone. The film's version of truth that Muslims formed a blood-thirsty community whole-heartedly supporting militants' assaults was believed liable to be replicated in other parts of India. In the Uttarakhand's Roorkee region, people said that the film enthused them to fight for their "rights". They regarded the local Muslims as jihadis, who were conspiring against the Hindus and tearing the nation apart.

== Box office ==
The Kashmir Files opened to box office with a slow start and competed with Prabhas-starrer Radhe Shyam, which was released on the same day, but has quickly gained higher share of collections within days. The film recorded an earnings of ₹3.55 crore (US$370,000), ₹8.5 crore (US$880,000) and ₹15.1 crore (US$1.6 million) in India respectively on its first three days, taking its opening weekend collection to ₹27.15 crore (US$2.8 million) and an estimated ₹5 crore (US$520,000) in India and overseas, respectively. After the response from the first two days, the screens were increased to 2,000 on 13 March 2022. With a collections growth of 323% on its first Monday compared to the release day, the film broke the record for the highest increase in collections for an Indian film on its first Monday. At the end of the first week, the film earned ₹97.3 crore (US$10 million) at the Indian box office.

After the response from the first week, the screens were increased to 4,000 by 18 March. In an interview with The New Yorker in June 2022, Agnihotri stated that ZEE Studios did not have faith in the film and thus the production studio had only released the film in 400 screens; and that the increase in the shows was in response to the audience demand. However, ZEE Studios clarified that the gradual increase in the number of screens was a "pre-decided business strategy" which was also agreed upon by the director.

The film emerged as a major box-office success within its first two days of release. It received massive push in the form of government support, national news coverage, social media forwards and word of mouth and rode on them following its opening weekend. By the end of April, according to Bollywood Hungama's estimates, the film grossed ₹297.53 crore (US$31 million) in India and ₹43.39 crore (US$4.5 million) overseas, for a worldwide gross collection of ₹340.92 crore (US$35 million), making it the third highest grossing Hindi film of 2022. It was the first film to cross the figure of ₹250 crore (US$26 million) in the aftermath of COVID-19 pandemic in India.

The film became a major competitor for the Akshay Kumar-starrer Bachchhan Paandey, which was released one week after The Kashmir Files, and eroded its box office collections.

== Accolades ==
Award	Date of ceremony	Category	Nominee(s)	Result	Ref(s)
National Film Awards	24 August 2023	Best Feature Film on National Integration	Vivek Agnihotri	Won	
National Film Awards	24 August 2023	Best Supporting Actress	Pallavi Joshi	Won	
Filmfare Awards	27 April 2023	Best Film	Zee Studios, Abhishek Agarwal Arts	Nominated	
Filmfare Awards	27 April 2023	Best Director	Vivek Agnihotri	Nominated	
Filmfare Awards	27 April 2023	Best Actor	Anupam Kher	Nominated	
Filmfare Awards	27 April 2023	Best Supporting Actor	Darshan Kumar	Nominated	
Filmfare Awards	27 April 2023	Best Supporting Actor	Mithun Chakraborty	Nominated	
Filmfare Awards	27 April 2023	Best Screenplay	Vivek Agnihotri	Nominated	
Filmfare Awards	27 April 2023	Best Editing	Shankh Rajadhyaksha	Nominated	
IIFA Awards	26–27 May 2023	Best Actor	Anupam Kher	Nominated	
IIFA Awards	26–27 May 2023	Best Story	Vivek Agnihotri	Nominated	

== See also ==
- 19th January, Indian film set during the exodus
- Shikara, Indian film set during the exodus
- The Kerala Story, Indian film based on the love jihad conspiracy theory
- Inshallah, Kashmir, Indian documentary film based on the exodus
- The Kashmir Files: Unreported, 2023 docuseries based on the film
- Schindler's List
