= The Bengal Files =

2025 Indian propaganda film by Vivek Agnihotri

- Theatrical release poster
- Directed by: Vivek Agnihotri
- Written by: Vivek Agnihotri
- Produced by: Abhishek Agarwal; Pallavi Joshi; Vivek Agnihotri
- Starring: Mithun Chakraborty; Pallavi Joshi; Darshan Kumar; Simrat Kaur; Anupam Kher; Saswata Chatterjee; Namashi Chakraborty; Puneet Issar; Sourav Das; Eklavya Sood
- Cinematography: Attar Singh Saini
- Edited by: Shankh Rajadhyaksha
- Music by: Rohit Sharma
- Production companies: Abhishek Agarwal Arts; I Am Buddha Productions
- Distributed by: Zee Studios
- Release date: 5 September 2025
- Running time: 204 minutes
- Country: India
- Language: Hindi
- Budget: ₹50+ crore
- Box office: ₹16.19 crore

The Bengal Files (Note: Subtitled The Bengal Files: Right To Life with the tagline Boldest Film Ever.) is a 2025 Indian Hindi-language political drama propaganda film written and directed by Vivek Agnihotri. It presents a storyline focused on the Direct Action Day and the Noakhali riots, depicting the violence and its aftermath as a genocide. (Note: Multiple references.) The film stars Mithun Chakraborty, Pallavi Joshi, Darshan Kumar, Anupam Kher and Simrat Kaur.

The Bengal Files is the third and final installment in Agnihotri's The Files Trilogy based on modern Indian history, following The Tashkent Files (2019) and The Kashmir Files (2022). With a runtime of 204 minutes, it is one of the longest Indian films and was released on 5 September 2025. The film received criticism over its distortion of history, and was commercially unsuccessful.

== Plot ==
The film portrays the tragic events surrounding Direct Action Day on 16 August 1946. Also known as the Great Calcutta Killings, the violence soon spread to surrounding regions of the Bengal Presidency, including the Noakhali riots and incidents in Tipperah and Comilla, which are depicted through a cinematic narrative. Based on real incidents of communal violence, the story highlights events that significantly shaped India's path to independence and partition.

Alongside this historical backdrop, the narrative follows a criminal investigator who, while working on a missing person case, uncovers a network of corruption. Parallel to his inquiry, another character reflects on the communal violence that erupted prior to the partition of India.

== Cast ==
- Mithun Chakraborty as Mad man Chatur
- Pallavi Joshi as Maa Bharati / aged Bharti Banerjee
  - Simrat Kaur as young Bharati Banerjee
- Darshan Kumar as Shiva Aloke Pandit, Special Investigating Officer, CBI
- Anupam Kher as Mahatma Gandhi
- Saswata Chatterjee as Sardar Husseini, MLA, Murshidabad
- Eklavya Sood as Amarjeet Arora
- Namashi Chakraborty as Ghulam Sarwar Hussaini
- Rajesh Khera as Muhammad Ali Jinnah
- Puneet Issar as Rajnath Singh, Director, CBI
- Priyanshu Chatterjee as Justice Banerjee
- Dibyendu Bhattacharya as Rajendra Lal Roychowdhary
- Sourav Das as Gopal Patha
- Mohan Kapur as Suhrawardy
- Anubha Arora as Gauri
- Madalsa Sharma as Sardar Hussaini's wife

== Production ==
Agnihotri announced the project in April 2022 following the success of The Kashmir Files. He initially titled the film The Delhi Files: The Bengal Chapter to emphasise his belief that "the destiny of India is written in Delhi and not in Bengal". In June 2025, Agnihotri officially renamed the film to The Bengal Files: Right to Life, reflecting the central focus on Bengal history rather than Delhi.

Agnihotri explained that the title shift was prompted by public sentiment: a social media poll received overwhelming support for renaming the film to better reflect its subject. He said, "The first and foremost reason is that the film is about Bengal... then I did a poll where 99 people asked me to change the title. That's when I thought, why get stuck in the communication... Now, it makes more sense." He also noted that the second part of the project will similarly undergo a title change after the first chapter's release.

Principal photography began in November 2024. Agnihotri confirmed that filming was wrapped by the end of January 2025.

Pallavi Joshi had initially refused to play her role, feeling it was too big a responsibility, and even suggested Agnihotri, her husband, to cast another actress of the character's age. She eventually decided to play the character after much persuasion.

== Soundtrack ==
The soundtrack of The Bengal Files consists of a single released song and a background score.

The devotional folk-based song Kichudin Mone Mone was released as the first single. It is sung and composed by Parvathy Baul, with lyrics credited as traditional.

According to the film's credits, Samarth Srinivasan is listed under the music department.

No.	Title	Lyrics	Music	Singer(s)	Length
1.	"Dhono Dhannye Pushpe Bhora Vintage"	Dwijendralal Ray	Dwijendralal Ray	Sagnik Sen	4:00
2.	"Kichudin Mone Mone"	Traditional	Parvathy Baul	Parvathy Baul	3:12
3.	"Kaala"	Traditional	Traditional	Parvathy Baul	3:08
4.	"Dhono Dhannye Pushpe Bhora Chorus"	Dwijendralal Ray	Dwijendralal Ray	Keka Ghoshal, Indrani Bhattacharjee, Swagata Nag, Aabhik Ghosh, Budhaditya Mukherjee, Sanjay Acharjee	4:00
5.	"Dhono Dhannye Pushpe Bhora"	Dwijendralal Ray	Dwijendralal Ray	Sagnik Sen	4:00
6.	"Kichudin Mone Mone Adlib"	Traditional	Traditional	Parvathy Baul	2:58
7.	"The Bengal Files Theme"	Instrumental	Rohit Sharma	Instrumental	2:29
8.	"The Glorious Past"	–	Rohit Sharma	–	2:15
9.	"The Glorious Past Reprise"	–	Rohit Sharma	–	1:14
10.	"The Glorious Past Slow"	–	Rohit Sharma	–	1:19
11.	"The Royalty Theme"	–	Rohit Sharma	–	1:18
12.	"The Demon Theme"	–	Rohit Sharma	–	0:58
13.	"The Demon Theme Reprise"	–	Rohit Sharma	–	0:52
14.	"Nostalgia Theme"	–	Rohit Sharma	–	1:40
15.	"Nostalgia Theme Reprise"	–	Rohit Sharma	–	1:41
16.	"Midnight Massacre 14th August"	–	Rohit Sharma	–	4:09
17.	"The Investigation"	–	Rohit Sharma	–	1:17
18.	"Opening Theme"	–	Rohit Sharma	–	1:13
19.	"Pre-Climax"	–	Rohit Sharma	–	3:38
20.	"Shiva's Past"	–	Rohit Sharma	–	1:11
21.	"Violin-Viola Theme"	–	Rohit Sharma	–	1:05
22.	"The Great Bengal"	–	Rohit Sharma	–	2:26

== Release ==
=== Theatrical ===
The Bengal Files was theatrically released on 5 September 2025. The film received an A (adults only) certificate from the CBFC, with a runtime of 204 minutes, with reasons citing extreme violence and gory content. Agnihotri warned that he will pursue legal action if West Bengal prevents the release of his film. Actor Victor Banerjee urged the President of India to guarantee that the screening occurs peacefully, free from intimidation or interference, and that the rights of both artists and audiences are fully safeguarded. Prior to the film's release, Agnihotri publicly appealed to West Bengal Chief Minister Mamata Banerjee, urging her not to impose a ban on the film. He emphasized that it was a work of art and historical storytelling, rather than a means of division.

=== Home media ===
The film began streaming on ZEE5 from 21 November 2025.

=== Accusations of non-release in West Bengal ===
A day before the film's release, Pallavi Joshi alleged that the film had been unofficially banned in West Bengal, claiming theatre owners were being intimidated due to political pressure. She wrote a letter to Droupadi Murmu, the President of India, urging protection of the film's supposed constitutional right to be viewed. This issue escalated further when Amit Malviya, the chief of BJP IT Cell, accused the Mamata Banerjee-led Trinamool Congress government of unofficially banning the film, while the accused party denied any involvement in the film's non-release, asserting that the decision rested solely with theatre owners and multiplex operators. Theatre owners in Kolkata clarified that no slots were available for the film as they were already screening films such as The Conjuring: Last Rites, Dhumketu, Bohurupi, and Baaghi 4.

Amid the controversy, it was announced that the film will eventually have its first invitation-only screening in Kolkata on September 13, 2025, at Dr. Syama Prasad Mookerjee Bhasha Bhavan, which is part of the National Library. The screening was organised by the socio-cultural platform Khola Hawa, restricting entry to the venue. A massive contingent of the Central Industrial Security Force (CISF) was deployed inside the National Library, and the audience included BJP leaders, former Meghalaya Governor Tathagata Roy, and noted Bengali singer Paroma. Swapan Dasgupta, a member of the BJP national executive and former MP, stated that Union Home Minister Amit Shah took a personal interest in arranging security and hoped that after the screening, theater owners would feel encouraged to show the film.

On 23 September 2025, the Calcutta High Court eventually questioned the West Bengal government whether it had imposed any restrictions on the film's release in the state. The state government told the Court that there was no such official or unofficial ban on the film.

== Reception ==
=== Box office ===
As of 25 September 2025, The Bengal Files has grossed ₹13.99 crore (US$1.5 million) in India, with a further ₹2.2 crore (US$230,000) overseas, for a worldwide total of ₹16.19 crore (US$1.7 million).

=== Critical response ===
The Bengal Files received predominantly negative reviews from critics. On the review aggregator website Rotten Tomatoes, four of six critic reviews are negative.

Mukund Setlur, writing for Deccan Herald, called the film a "double-edged disaster" and a "dilemma emerging from incoherent writing and poor editing". Kartik Bhardwaj of Cinema Express gave the film 1 star out of 5, claiming that it reeked of propaganda and made for an excruciating experience akin to a bland history lesson, where even the performances could not leave a mark and felt perfunctory. Anuj Kumar from The Hindu reviewed the film negatively as well, accusing it of using cinema as a tool to divide, and also added that "the makers create their own history around the recorded events". Radhika Sharma of NDTV found the film unending, disturbingly graphic, gory, and gruesome, while also finding the imagery "in your face" and the performances screechy and over the top.

Abhishek Srivastava from The Times of India gave the film 3.5 stars out of 5, noting that it reveled in shock value, and with scenes of grotesque violence succeeding in evoking anger, despair and reflection, the film also managed to connect at an emotional level, "offering glimpses into suffering that transcended politics". Anurag Singh Bohra from India Today gave the film 3 stars out of 5, praising the performances and visuals, while also feeling the execution was marred by slow pacing, nonlinear storytelling, and a stretched runtime. Rishabh Suri from Hindustan Times gave the film 3 stars out of 5, feeling that while the film did get over-indulgent at times in its treatment of history, it was salvaged by "fine performances". Rachit Gupta from Filmfare gave the film 2.5 stars out of 5, labelling it "a violent and over-dramatised look at partition horrors".

Lachmi Deb Roy from Firstpost gave the film 2 stars out of 5, praising the performances except that of Darshan Kumar, and finding the story gripping while also feeling the characters were not comprehensively written and that the execution could have been better. Titas Chowdhury from CNN-News18 also gave the film 2 stars out of 5, finding the lengthy runtime to be its biggest weakness, the violence nauseating, and the film as a whole underwhelming even as a piece of art. Shubhra Gupta from The Indian Express gave the film 1.5 stars out of 5, finding the performances overwrought, the violence sickening, and the overall execution loose and confused. Shomini Sen from WION felt that while the story was compelling, the execution was problematic, and the film was too graphic and divisive to be taken seriously. Shilajit Mitra of The Hollywood Reporter India praised the set extensions and the framing in a couple of countryside scenes, but felt the film made no room for depicting the plight of the Muslims killed in the partition riots and the only solution it offered was answering communalism with communalism. Anant Gupta of Scroll.in says, "Other than gore, the film has nothing perceptive to say about communal violence. It leaps from one scene to another without offering a diagnosis or even a coherent critique of the passions that drive people to commit horrific acts of violence on one another". Gupta further highlights the use of narratives, slogans, and symbols aligned with Hindutva, a Hindu nationalist ideology.

== Controversies ==
In April 2022, the Maharashtra Sikh Association issued objections, claiming the film would commercialise the 1984 Sikh massacres.

Actor Saswata Chatterjee distanced himself from the controversy, revealing that he was unaware of the change in the film's title from Delhi Files to The Bengal Files, while also reiterating that he was merely an actor who played a character and not a historian tasked with verifying historical claims. In response to this, Pallavi Joshi, the producer of the film, addressed the claims, and suggested that Chatterjee might be facing political pressure. She also denied that he was informed solely about his character, clarifying that the film was originally titled The Delhi Files: Bengal Chapter and that it supposedly always intended to focus on Bengal.

During the trailer launch at a Kolkata hotel on 16 August 2025, which was initially planned at a movie theatre, the screening was abruptly halted by Kolkata Police. Agnihotri criticised the move, and falsely claimed the screening were halted for political reasons. A senior Kolkata Police official later clarified that the organisers had failed to obtain an amusement license, which is required for hosting such screenings.

On 20 June, 2025 former Bengal minister Purnendu Basu, during a press conference, said, "The BJP and RSS are trying to incite riots in Bengal through provocative politics. This film, The Bengal Files, directed by Agnihotri, is a deliberate distortion of Bengal's history, just like his earlier propaganda film The Kashmir Files, which was promoted by none other than Prime Minister Narendra Modi for political gain." Filmmaker Haranath Chakraborty added that just casting a few Bengali actors is not enough for a film to have represented Bengal state or its culture.

Another controversy centered around Gopal 'Patha' Mukherjee. His grandson, Santanu Mukherjee, filed a complaint at Bowbazar Police Station, accusing Agnihotri of showing his grandfather in poor light and neither taking the family's permission nor approaching them before making the film. Agnihotri, on the other hand, claimed that Gopal Patha in his film was an inspired, heroically portrayed character and not central to the plot. Sourav Das, the actor playing Gopal Patha, eventually distanced himself from the film, claiming he only knew about his character while being unaware of the script. Agnihotri said that the depiction of Gopal Patha is based on Patha's own words. In September, Agnihotri faced criticism for posting a screening featuring children, despite the film being under a lead that was commended.
