= Sarwanand Koul Premi =

Kashmiri poet and independence activist

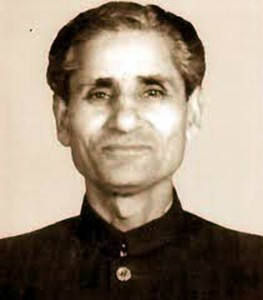
Sarwanand Koul Premi

Sarwanand Koul Premi, also spelled Sarvanand Kaul Premi (2 November 1924 – 1 May 1990), was a Kashmiri poet, journalist, research scholar, Gandhian, social reformer and independence activist living in Jammu & Kashmir, India. Along with his young married son, Verinder (27), he was kidnapped, tortured and killed by terrorists in 1990.

For a few years he worked for the Village and the Khadi Industries Board (a state enterprise) as well as the Industries Department of Punjab. He returned to Kashmir and joined the education department of Jammu and Kashmir as a teacher from 1954 to 1977.

== Published work ==
- Kalami Premi
- Payami Premi
- Rood Jeri
- Osh ta Vush
- Gitanjanli (Translations)
- Russi Padshah Katha
- Panctchadar (poetic collections)
- Bakhti Koosum
- Akhri Mulaqat
- Mathur Devi
- MIrza Kak (life and works)
- Mirza Kak Ji Wakhs
- Kashmiri ki beeti
- Bagwat Gita (Translations 1)
- Taj
- Rupa Bhawani

== Death ==
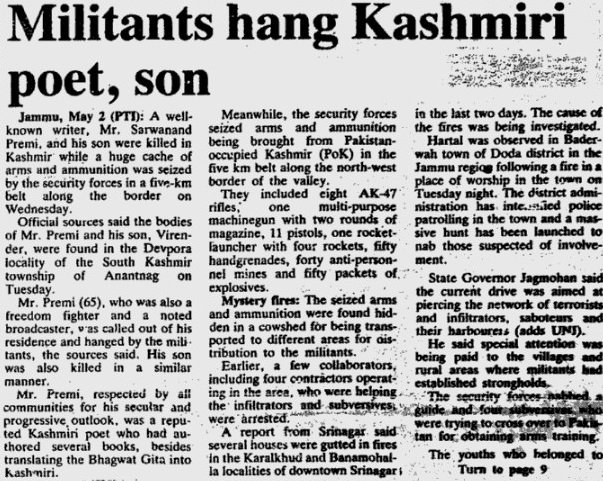
News report on Mr. Sarwanand Premi and Virender Premi's murder

On the night of 29–30 April 1990, three armed Islamist militants came to the house of Premi. The militants looted the family of their valuables, taking their gold, jewellery and pashminas, and demanded that Premi accompany the militants back to their commander. Premi’s younger son, Virender, insisted that he come along with his father. On 1 May, the bodies of Premi and his son were found hanging from a tree, about 20 kilometres away from their house. They had been tortured, their bones broken and eyes had been gouged out. Nails had been hammered on their foreheads at the place where Hindus typically apply the tilaka. Their bodies also had cigarette burns and they had also been shot with guns.

=== Aftermath ===
A first information report (FIR) was filed at the Dooru police station. Five days after the murders of Premi and his son, the remaining Koul family fled their village in Kashmir for Jammu, where they lived for a few days before moving permanently to Delhi. In August 1998, eight years after the murders, their abandoned family home in Kashmir was set on fire by local miscreants. An FIR was lodged but the culprits were never found.
