= Giles Tillotson =

British Indologist

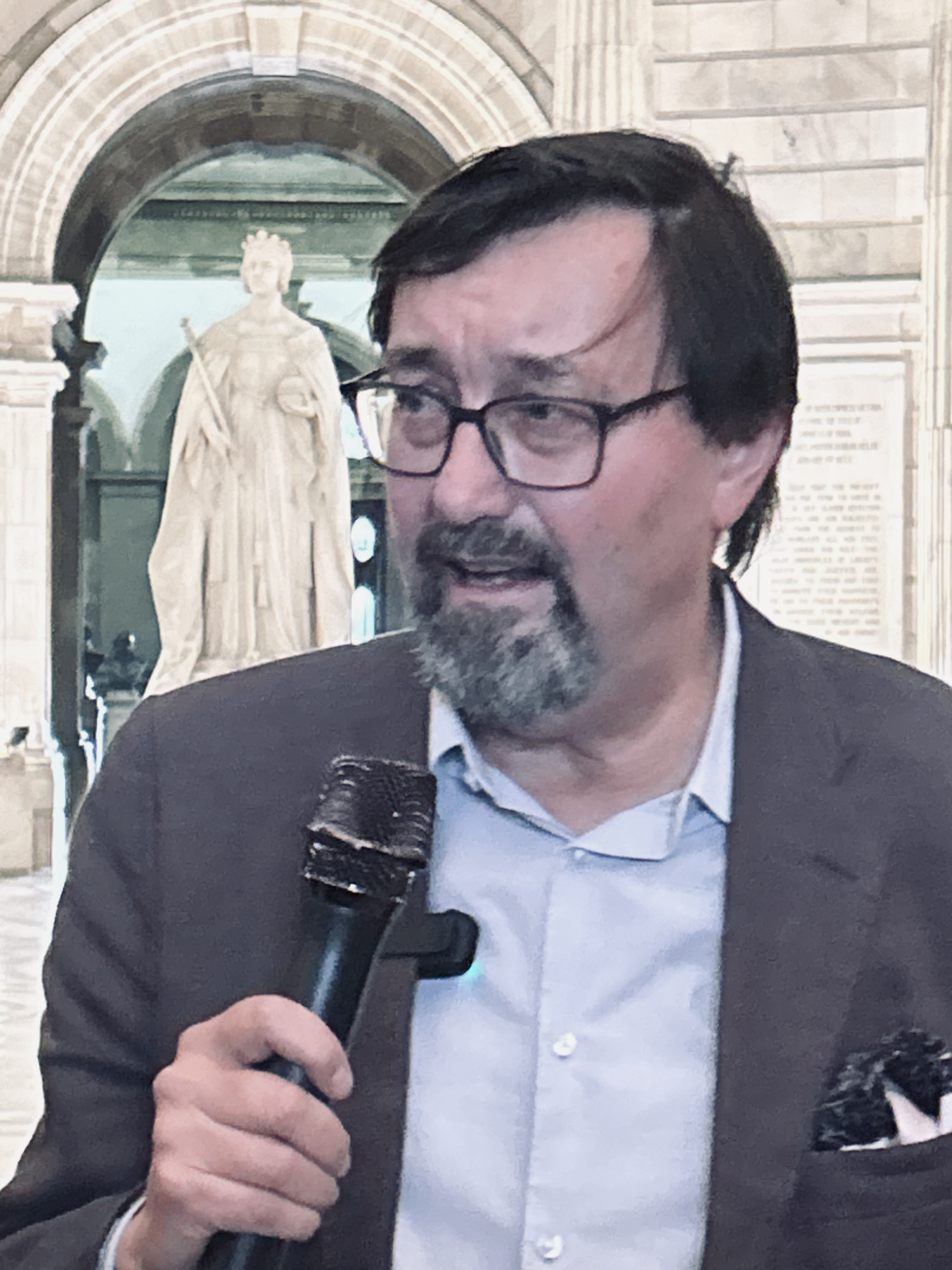

Giles Tillotson FRAS
- Born: July 25, 1960 (age 66)

Giles Henry Rupert Tillotson (born 1960) is a writer and lecturer on Indian history and architecture.

== Career ==
He was previously Reader in History of Art and Chair of Art & Archaeology at the School of Oriental and African Studies (SOAS), University of London. From 2011 to 2020 he was Consultant Director at the Maharaja Sawai Man Singh II Museum in the City Palace, Jaipur. He is also Fellow and a former director of the Royal Asiatic Society, London.

He currently lives in India and is Senior Vice President (Museum Exhibitions) at DAG, New Delhi.

His scholarly books include The Rajput Palaces (1987), The Tradition of Indian Architecture (1989), The Artificial Empire (2000), and Building Jaipur (2002, co-authored with Vibhuti Sachdev). His popular writing for general audiences includes his 'Golden Triangle' trilogy - Jaipur Nama (2006), Taj Mahal (2008), and Delhi Darshan (2019) - and the historical novella Return to Bhanupur (2012). He has also edited books on collections, including James Tod's Rajasthan: The Historian and his Collections (2007), A Passionate Eye: Textiles, Paintings and Sculptures from the Bharany Collections (2014), Painting & Photography at the Jaipur Court (2016, with Mrinalini Venkateswaran), and Modern Indian Painting: Jane & Kito de Boer Collection (2019, with Rob Dean).

== Works ==
His major publications include:

- The Rajput Palaces: The Development of an Architectural Style, 1450-1750 (1987).
- Fan Kwae Pictures: Paintings and Drawings by George Chinnery and Other Artists in the Collection of the Hongkong and Shanghai Banking Corporation (1987)
- The Tradition of Indian Architecture: Continuity, Controversy and Change since 1850 (1989).
- Mughal India (1990).
- Paradigms of Indian Architecture: Space and Time in Representation and Design (editor, 1998).
- The Artificial Empire: The Indian Landscapes of William Hodges (2000).
- Stones in the Sand: The Architecture of Rajasthan (editor, 2001).
- Building Jaipur: The Making of an Indian City (with Vibhuti Sachdev, 2002).
- Jaipur Nama: Tales from the Pink City (2006).
- James Tod's Rajasthan: The Historian and his Collections (editor, 2007).
- Jaipur City Palace (with Vibhuti Sachdev, 2008).
- Taj Mahal (2008).
- Mehrangarh: Jodhpur Fort & Palace Museum (2010, revised 2018)
- Nagaur: A Garden Palace in Rajasthan (2010)
- Umaid Bhawan Palace: Jodhpur Modern (2011)
- Return to Bhanupur: a novel (2012).
- A Passionate Eye: Textiles, Paintings and Sculptures from the Bharany Collections (editor, 2014).
- Painting & Photography at the Jaipur Court (editor, with Mrinalini Venkateswaran, 2016)
- Modern Indian Painting: Jane & Kito de Boer Collection (edited, with Rob Dean, 2019)
- Delhi Darshan: The History and Monuments of India's Capital (2019)
- Vision & Landscape: Aquatints of India by Thomas Daniell and William Daniell (editor, 2019)
- Masterpieces at the Jaipur Court (editor, with Mrinalini Venkateswaran, 2022)
- Tipu Sultan: Image & Distance (editor, 2022)
- William Hodges & the Prospect of India (editor, 2023)
