= The Kashmir Files: Unreported =

2023 Indian documentary series

- Promotional poster
- Genre: Documentary
- Directed by: Vivek Agnihotri
- Country of origin: India
- Original language: Hindi
- No. of seasons: 1
- No. of episodes: 7

Production
- Running time: 40 minutes
- Production company: ZEE5

Original release
- Network: ZEE5

The Kashmir Files: Unreported is documentary series directed by Vivek Agnihotri, streaming on ZEE5. The series investigates the history of the Kashmir conflict based on data gathered before the making of The Kashmir Files (2022).

== Overview ==
The series was announced by Vivek Agnihotri following harsh criticism of his film The Kashmir Files (2022) by Israeli filmmaker Nadav Lapid at the International Film Festival of India. The Kashmir Files: Unreported is aimed to shed light on the lesser-known aspects of the exodus of Kashmiri Hindus from Kashmir. It aims to provide an understanding of social complexities of the region, as well as examine the impact of the conflict on the lives of ordinary people living in Kashmir. The documentary series takes viewers through the troubled past of the Kashmir Valley, exploring the events that led to the dispute between India and Pakistan over the region.

== Cast ==
- Vivek Agnihotri
- Pallavi Joshi

== Episodes ==
The series is divided into seven episodes, each focusing on a specific aspect of the Kashmir conflict.

== Marketing ==
To kickstart promotions for the series the filmmakers visited the Shankaracharya Temple in Kashmir. The trailer of the show was subsequently released on 21 July 2023, in Srinagar, Kashmir.
