= Vivek Agnihotri =

Indian director, screenwriter and author

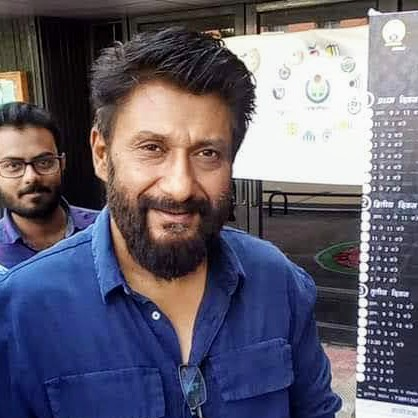
- Agnihotri in 2020
- Born: 10 November 1973 (age 53); Gwalior, Madhya Pradesh, India
- Education: Indian Institute of Mass Communication
- Occupations: Film director; film producer; screenwriter; author
- Notable work: The Kashmir Files; The Tashkent Files
- Spouse: Pallavi Joshi (m. 1997)
- Children: 2
- Awards: National Film Awards (2023, 2021)
- Honours: Honorary Doctorate (DY Patil University, 2024)
- Website: vivekagnihotri.com

Vivek Ranjan Agnihotri (born 10 November 1973) is an Indian director, producer, and writer who works in Hindi cinema. He is a member of the board of India's Central Board of Film Certification and a cultural representative of Indian Cinema at the Indian Council for Cultural Relations.

Agnihotri made his directorial debut with the crime thriller Chocolate (2005) and has directed multiple films since which failed to propel his career forward until The Tashkent Files (2019) which emerged as a commercial success and earned him the National Film Award for Best Screenplay - Dialogues. He also wrote and directed The Kashmir Files (2022) which emerged as one of the highest-grossing Indian film of 2022 and earned him the Nargis Dutt Award for Best Feature Film on National Integration. He next wrote and directed a medical drama film The Vaccine War (2023) which emerged as a box-office bomb. He released his documentary, The Kashmir Files: Unreported in 2024 and The Bengal Files in 2025.

== Early life and education ==
Agnihotri was born at Jawahar Colony in Gwalior, Madhya Pradesh to Prabhu Dayal Agnihotri and Sharda Agnihotri. His father was a professor at Victoria College, Gwalior. He did his schooling from Kendriya Vidyalaya, Gwalior. Later, he studied at the Indian Institute of Mass Communication before enrolling at Harvard Extension School for a Certificate of Special Studies in Administration and Management. (Note: CSS was started in 1980 as a certificate course for students with a bachelor's degree but no prior training in business or management. In 2007 it was converted into a full Master of Liberal Arts in Extension Studies (ALM) in management.) He has also procured degrees from Bhopal School of Social Sciences, Jawaharlal Nehru University and DY Patil University.

== Career ==
=== Advertising and television serials ===
Agnihotri started his career with the advertising agencies Ogilvy and McCann, and served as creative director for campaigns of Gillette and Coca-Cola. In 1994, he became involved with the directing and production of several television serials; his work was positively received. In 2018, Agnihotri claimed that he had received threats for using the name Mohammad in his short film Mohammad and Urvashi.

=== Filmmaking ===
Agnihotri debuted in Bollywood with Chocolate (2005), a remake of the 1995 Hollywood neo-noir crime thriller The Usual Suspects. Critical reception of the movie was negative, and the film fared poorly at box office.

His next venture, Dhan Dhana Dhan Goal, was about an all-Asian football team in the United Kingdom that wins trophies while fighting on-field discrimination and the local municipality that wants to sell the team's ground. It received poor reception from critics and did "average" business at the box office.He then directed Hate Story, which received mixed critical reception and fared moderately at the box office.

His next film, Buddha in a Traffic Jam featured his wife Pallavi and premiered at Mumbai International Film Festival in 2014; it was received unfavorably by critics and severely under-performed at the box office. Upon release, it attracted attention and controversy for its political content, with screenings at several universities sparking protests and clashes. Junooniyat was also subject to poor reviews and fared similarly.

Agnihotri's 2014 erotic thriller Zid received poor reviews but did average business at the box office. However, Agnihotri has since claimed that credit for direction and screenplay was wrongly attributed to him, and that he was not involved with the film. The Tashkent Files became a sleeper box-office hit and won National Film Awards. In March 2022, Agnihotri released The Kashmir Files on the exodus of Kashmiri Hindus; which become a blockbuster hit and earned him another National Film Award. Shortly after the release of the film, he was provided Y-category security detail across the country by the Ministry of Home Affairs based on inputs from the Intelligence Bureau. Agnihotri's next film was the medical drama film The Vaccine War (2023) which was about the development of Covaxin during the COVID-19 pandemic in India. The film opened to mixed reviews from the critics and emerged as a box-office bomb.

His latest film The Bengal Files (2025), which was originally titled "The Delhi Files" and based on 1984 riots, before being renamed to The Bengal Files, focused on Direct Action Day and the Noakhali riots. The film released to mixed reviews and became a box office flop.

=== Film certification ===
In 2017, Agnihotri was selected as convenor by the Ministry of Information and Broadcasting in the preview committee of 48th International Film Festival of India. The same year, he was selected as member on board of India's Central Board of Film Certification.

=== ICCR ===
On 15 September 2020, Agnihotri was appointed as cultural representative at Indian Council for Cultural Relations. He would represent Indian Cinema at ICCR.

=== Urban Naxals ===
In 2018, Agnihotri wrote the book Urban Naxals: The Making of Buddha in a Traffic Jam, in which he described individuals in academia and media who were allegedly colluding with Naxalites in a bid to overthrow the Indian government and were thus "invisible enemies of India" as "Urban Naxals".

Critics said the term is "vague rhetoric" that is designed to discredit intellectuals who are critical of the establishment and political right, and to stifle dissent. The Union Minister of Human Resource Development Smriti Irani endorsed Agnihotri's views of Jadavpur University and Jawaharlal Nehru University for having refused to screen Buddha in a Traffic Jam.

=== National Kishore Kumar Award ===
In 2022, Agnihotri received the National Kishore Kumar Samman.

== Personal life ==
Agnihotri married Indian actress Pallavi Joshi in 1997 and has two children. He has described himself as a supporter of Narendra Modi, but not of the Bharatiya Janata Party that Modi belongs to. Agnihotri supports cannabis legalization.

In 2022, Agnihotri announced that he was starting knee surgery after suffering a cartilage tear the previous year, which resulted in him suffering a stress fracture. He had ignored the cartilage tear for one and half years while producing The Kashmir Files.

In 2022, Agnihotri delivered a speech in the Parliament of the United Kingdom. The theme of the event was "India, world peace and humanism".

== Controversies ==
Fact checkers have noted Agnihotri to have shared misleading content from his Twitter account. In September 2018, Agnihotri tweeted a listicle claiming that a survey from the BBC found that the Indian National Congress was the second most corrupt party in the world. The survey was fake and an online editor writing for the BBC said that they have never conducted such surveys. In November 2018, Agnihotri tweeted a misleading video that appeared to show that Indian political activist Kanhaiya Kumar had converted to Islam. According to Boom Fact Check, the video was "a compilation of three separate clips which have taken Kanhaiya's statements out of context from the entire speech." In March 2019, Agnihotri falsely claimed that former Indian Prime Minister Jawaharlal Nehru was responsible for the outcome of the Indo-Pakistani War of 1965. Nehru had died in May 1964 and Lal Bahadur Shastri was Prime Minister during the war. In January 2020, Agnihotri tweeted a doctored image of an anti-Citizenship Amendment Act (CAA) protester that he claimed was real. In February 2020, Agnihotri falsely claimed that cannabis kills COVID-19.

In September 2018, Twitter locked his account until he agreed to delete a tweet denigrating Swara Bhaskar. In response to Swara calling out politician P. C. George, who called an alleged rape victim a prostitute, Vivek tweeted "Where is the placard - '#MeTooProstituteNun'?". The tweet was interpreted as calling Swara a prostitute. Agnihotri defended his tweet and said he was making a point about the placarding by liberals at selective instances of alleged perpetrators belonging to the Hindu community.

Agnihotri and his team, including his wife, Pallavi Joshi, and Abhishek Agarwal, had issued a legal notice to Mamata Banerjee, the Chief Minister of West Bengal. The notice had demanded the retraction of her comments that had labeled The Kashmir Files (2022) as false propaganda aimed at humiliating a particular group. Alleging defamation and malicious intent, the notice had required an unconditional apology. The team had asserted that Banerjee's remarks were baseless and intended to tarnish their film and reputation.

In August 2024, Agnihotri faced controversy when an old social media post from 2013 of his consisting of an offensive rape joke, went viral after he joined a rally for solidarity on justice for the victim, during protests against Banerjee's government.

He was accused by bollywood actress Tanushree Dutta for sexual hassment on the sets of Chocolate (2005).

In 2018, Dutta would accuse Agnihotri of inappropriate behaviour during its filming. He allegedly asked her to strip and dance to give expression cues to her male co-star Irrfan Khan during a close-up shot and retreated only after Irrfan and Suniel Shetty rebuffed him. Agnihotri denied the allegations as "false and frivolous", and filed a defamation case against Dutta. Sattyajit Gazmer, the film's assistant director, also disputed Tanushree's allegations.

In September 2025, Agnihotri faced criticism for posting a screening of the Bengal Files featuring children, despite the film being rated A.

== Filmography ==
Key
†	Denotes films that are not yet been released

Year	Title	Producer	Director	Screenwriter	Notes
2005	Chocolate		✓	✓	Uncredited remake of The Usual Suspects (1995)
2007	Goal		✓		
2012	Hate Story		✓		
2014	Zid		✓	✓	
2016	Buddha in a Traffic Jam	✓	✓	✓	
2016	Junooniyat		✓	✓	
2019	The Tashkent Files	✓	✓	✓	
2022	The Kashmir Files	✓	✓	✓	Nominated – Filmfare Award for Best Film; Nominated – Filmfare Award for Best Director; Nominated – Filmfare Award for Best Screenplay
2023	The Kashmir Files: Unreported	✓	✓	✓	Documentary
2023	The Vaccine War	✓	✓	✓	
2025	The Bengal Files	✓	✓	✓	

== Bibliography ==
- Urban Naxals: The Making of Buddha in a Traffic Jam. Garuda Prakashan. 2018. ISBN 9781942426059.
- Who Killed Shastri?: The Tashkent Files. Bloomsbury India. 2020. ISBN 9789388630610.

== Awards and nominations ==
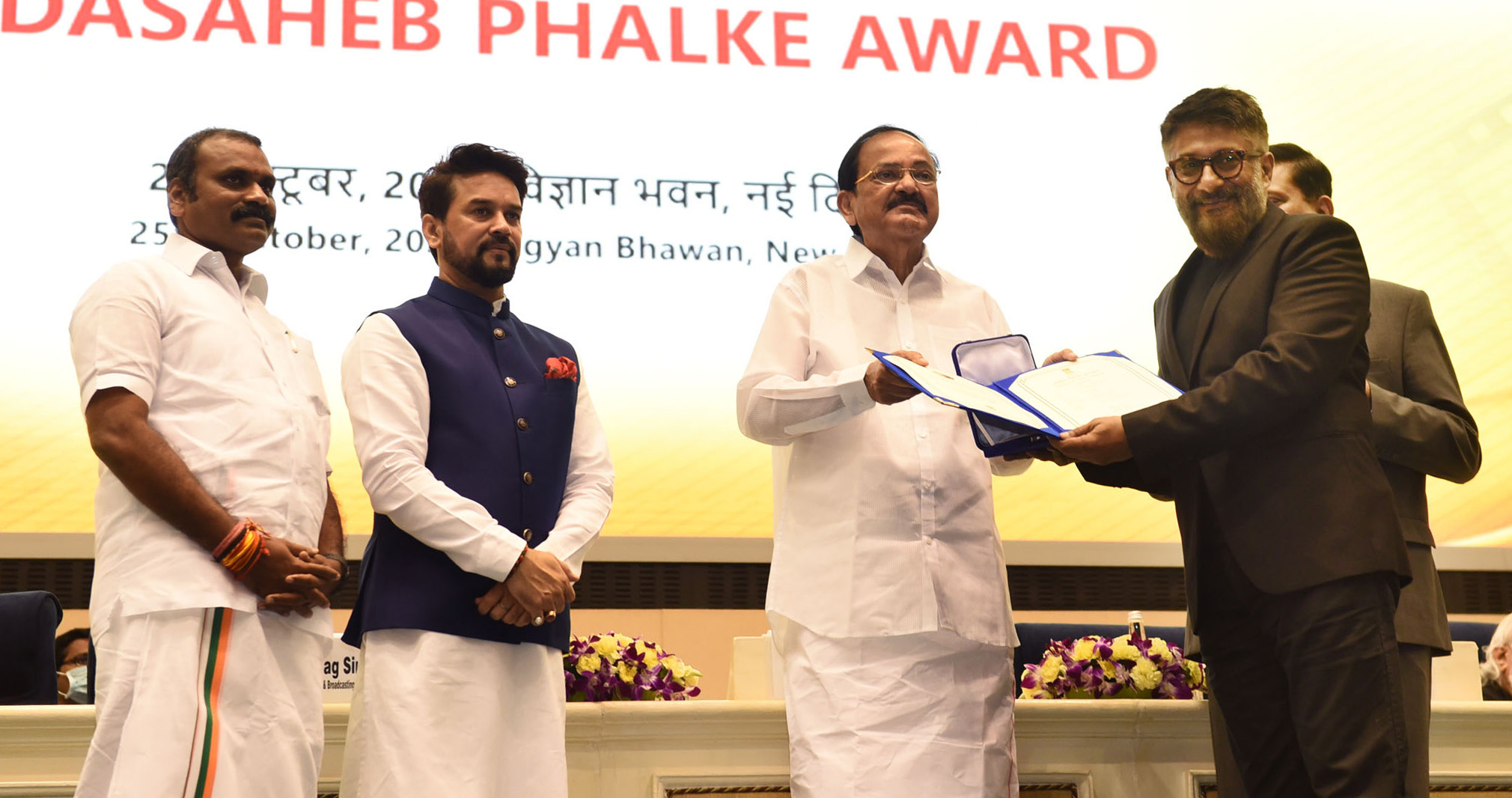
Agnihotri at the 67th National Film Awards ceremony in New Delhi on 25 October 2021

Year	Award	Category	Work	Result	Ref
2023	National Film Awards	Nargis Dutt Award for Best Feature Film on National Integration	The Kashmir Files	Won	
2023	Zee Cine Awards	Best Screenplay	The Kashmir Files	Won	
2023	Filmfare Awards	Best Director and Best Screenplay	The Kashmir Files	Nominated	
2022	National Kishore Kumar Award (MP Govt)	Outstanding Contribution	—	Won	
2022	Indian Television Awards	Golden Film of Indian Cinema	The Kashmir Files	Won	
2022	International Indian Film Festival of Toronto (LIIFT) / IFFI	Best Feature Film on Human Rights	The Kashmir Files	Won	
2021	National Film Awards	Best Screenplay (Dialogues)	The Tashkent Files	Won	
2014	Jakarta International Film Festival	Best Writer and Director	Buddha in a Traffic Jam	Won	

== Honours ==
In 2024, Agnihotri was conferred an honorary doctorate by D.Y. Patil University for his contribution to cinema and the arts.
