= Inn Galiyon Mein =

Indian film by Avinash Das

- Official release poster
- Directed by: Avinash Das
- Written by: Punarvasu
- Produced by: Vinod Yadav; Sanjeevv Gosswami; Adarsh Saxena; Jannisar Hussain
- Starring: Jaaved Jaaferi; Vivaan Shah; Avantika Dasan; Sushant Singh; Ishtiyak Khan; Veenay Bhaskar
- Cinematography: Arvind Kannabiran
- Edited by: Jabeen Merchant
- Music by: Songs: Abhijeet Bhattacharya; Udit Narayan; Alka Yagnik; Amaal Mallik; Score: Saurabh Kalsi; Arvind Sagole
- Production companies: Yadunath Films; Alcor Productions Pvt Ltd
- Distributed by: Zee Studios
- Release date: 14 March 2025
- Running time: 210 minutes
- Country: India
- Language: Hindi

Inn Galiyon Mein is a 2025 Indian Hindi-language romantic drama film directed by Avinash Das and produced by Vinod Yadav and Neeru Yadav under Yadunath Films. Co-producers include Jannisar Hussain, Adarsh Saxena, Sanjeevv Gosswami, and Alcor Productions. The film stars Jaaved Jaaferi, Vivaan Shah, and Avantika Dassani in lead roles, with Sushant Singh, Ishtiyak Khan, and Veenay Bhaskar in supporting roles. The film was released theatrically on 14 March 2025, after being postponed from its original release date of 28 February 2025 to coincide with the Holi festival. It marked Avantika Dassani's feature film debut.

== Plot ==
Set in contemporary India, the film explores love and human relationships in the digital era. Through its central characters, Inn Galiyon Mein examines how social media influences romance, communication, and trust. The narrative follows Hariya, Shabbo, and Mirza, whose intertwined journeys reflect the struggle between traditional values and modern ways of connecting in an age dominated by virtual interactions.

== Cast ==
- Jaaved Jaaferi as Mirza
- Vivaan Shah as Hari Ram aka Hariya
- Avantika Dassani as Shabnam aka Shabbo
- Sushant Singh as Ajay Tiwari
- Ishtiyak Khan as Bhanga
- Veenay Bhaskar

== Production ==
=== Development ===
The project was announced in mid-2024 by Avinash Das, who previously directed Anaarkali of Aarah (2017). According to reports, the film was conceptualized as a romantic drama reflecting the influence of social media on interpersonal relationships.

=== Casting ===
Jaaved Jaaferi and Vivaan Shah were confirmed early in the project. Avantika Dassani, daughter of actress Bhagyashree, joined the cast for her debut feature film role. Sushant Singh and Ishtiyak Khan were later added in supporting roles.

=== Filming ===
Principal photography began in late 2024 at locations in Uttar Pradesh and Delhi. Shooting was completed in early 2025.

=== Music ===
The soundtrack was composed by Amaal Mallik, Saurabh Kalsi, and Arvind Sagole, with lyrics by Vimal Kashyap, Punarvasu, Yash Malviya, and Saurabh Kalsi. The second single titled "Jaa Janam Jaa" was released on 11 March 2025.

Inn Galiyon Mein

Soundtrack album by Amaal Mallik, Saurabh Khalsi, Arvind Sagole
- Released: 11 March 2025
- Genre: Feature film soundtrack
- Length: 31:36
- Language: Hindi
- Label: Zee Music

Track listing
| No. | Title | Singer(s) | Length |
|---|---|---|---|
| 1. | "Patang Ki Dor" | Armaan Malik, Palak Muchhal | 3:35 |
| 2. | "Uda Hawa Mein Rang Hai" | Nakash Aziz | 5:01 |
| 3. | "Maaheru" | Javed Ali, Shalmali Kholgade | 4:08 |
| 4. | "Ja Jaanam Ja" | Sonu Nigam | 3:08 |
| 5. | "Patang Ki Dor (Armaan Malik Version)" | Armaan Malik | 3:35 |
| 6. | "Maaheru (Javed Ali Version)" | Javed Ali | 4:07 |
| 7. | "Patang Ki Dor" (Female Version) | Palak Muchal | 3:35 |
| 8. | "Maaheru" (Female Version) | Shalmali Kholgade | 3:37 |
| 9. | "Aankhon Mein Base Ho Tum 2.0" (Maya Govind , Tanishk Bagchi) | Abhijeet Bhattacharya, Alka Yagnik, Suniel Shetty, Raveena Tandon | 3:39 |
| 10. | "Maine Dil Se Yeh Poochha 2.0" (Tanishk Bagchi, Meet Bros Anjaan) | Udit Narayan, Alka Yagnik, Suniel Shetty, Raveena Tandon | 3:41 |
| 11. | "Hota Hai Pyaar Hojata Hai" (Tanishk Bagchi, Meet Bros Arjaan) | Jubin Nautiyal, Sunidhi Chauhan | 3:43 |
| 12. | "Subha Se Lekar Dophar Tak Dophar Se Lekar Sham Tak Sham Se Lekar Raat Tak" (Tanishk Bagchi, Meet Bros Arjaan) | Jubin Nautiyal, Shreya Ghoshal | 3:45 |
| Total length: | | | 25:13 |

== Release ==
The film was initially scheduled for release on 28 February 2025, but its premiere was postponed to 14 March 2025 to coincide with Holi celebrations. It was distributed by Zee Studios.

== Reception ==
=== Critical Response ===
Film Critic Subhash K. Jha gave 4 stars out of 5 and writes in his review that "The film has a wispy glow in its eco-system. It whistles its way through complex communal questions, not out of naivete, but the opposite: sometimes it just seems correct to let positivity prevail. This is one of those occasions. Buoyed by a mood of optimism, Inn Galiyon Mein gives us no choice but to bask in its charm and warmth."

Abhishek Srivastava of The Times of India rated the film 3 out of 5 stars and wrote, "While it has its moments, an average screenplay limits its impact. More than a gripping narrative, it serves as a social commentary on cultural and religious dynamics. Given the subject’s potential, the film needed a more innovative script—without it, it leans into familiar tropes." Risha Ganguly of Times Now gave 3 out of 5 stars and wrote, "Inn Galiyon Mein marries romance with contemporary social issues. The film did have the potential to make it an engaging and relevant watch. With compelling performances, a well-crafted narrative, and a strong directorial vision, a novel and fresh idea could have worked much better."

Anuj Kumar of The Hindu wrote, "A film that demands to be heard rather than seen, in terms of form, it seems to be conceived like a dialogue-heavy piece for theatre. There are passages where it starts reading like an editorial on Ganga Jamuni tehzeeb interspersed with couplets of progressive poets. But, at 100 minutes, Inn Galiyon Mein doesn’t get stuck in the didactics."

Rishabh Suri of Hindustan Times gave 2.5 stars out of 5 and said, "The film’s message of unity and harmony is timely, even if the execution falters. From a business standpoint, it remains to be seen whether audiences, already hesitant about visiting theaters, will take a chance on it. But films like these deserve to be made—offering stories that hold attention without relying on big names or chartbuster music."

=== Box Office Collection ===
The film opened poorly at the Indian box office, earning around ₹7 lakh in its first weekend. Against an undisclosed budget, the film underperformed commercially, and Bollywood Hungama classified it as a 'flop'.

== See also ==
- List of Hindi films of 2025
- Jaaved Jaaferi Filmography
- Vivaan Shah filmography
- Avinash Das
