= Avinash Das =

Indian filmmaker

- Born: 14 January 1976 (age 49)
- Occupation: Indian Filmmaker
- Spouse: Swarn Kanta

Avinash Das (born 14 January 1976) is an Indian filmmaker. He is mostly known for directing Bollywood film Anaarkali of Aarah, Netflix series She, ZEE5 movie Raat Baki Hai and MX Player series Runaway Lugaai.

== Career ==
Avinash started his career as a journalist at NDTV before joining Dainik Bhaskar, a Hindi language daily newspaper. He directed his first movie Anaarkali of Aarah in 2017, featuring Swara Bhaskar, Sanjay Mishra and Pankaj Tripathi. In 2020, Das made his Netflix debut with TV series She, starring Aditi Pohankar and Vijay Varma. In 2021, he directed Raat Baki Hai, featuring Anup Soni, Dipannita Sharma and Rahul Dev. In the same year, he also came up with Runaway Lugaai, starring Ruhi Singh.

== Biography ==
He was born in Darbhanga, Bihar. He studied at Lalit Narayan Mithila University in his hometown. Das currently resides in Mumbai with his wife Swarn Kanta and daughter Shravani Das.

== Controversy ==
In July 2022, he was detained for sharing a photo of Union minister Amit Shah with a former IAS officer Pooja Singhal. He was arrested from his residence in Mumbai. The police filed a complaint against him for misleading people and tarnishing the image of Mr Shah. He was also accused of availing freelance services without making the due payments for the completed projects. A separate case was also filed against him for sharing the picture of a woman wearing national flag on Facebook.

== Filmography ==
Year	Title	Director	Writer	Producer
2017	Anaarkali of Aarah	Yes	Yes	
2020	She	Yes		
2021	Raat Baaki Hai	Yes		
2021	Runaway Lugaai	Yes		
2025	Inn Galiyon Mein	Yes		
