= IC 814: The Kandahar Hijack =

2024 Indian television series

- Promotional release poster
- Genre: Thriller; Drama
- Created by: Anubhav Sinha; Trishant Srivastava
- Based on: Flight Into Fear The Captain's Story by Devi Sharan and Srinjoy Chowdhury
- Written by: Adrian Levy; Trishant Srivastava
- Directed by: Anubhav Sinha
- Starring: Vijay Varma; Naseeruddin Shah; Pankaj Kapur; Dia Mirza; Arvind Swamy
- Composers: Alex Lamy; Richard Harvey
- Country of origin: India
- Original language: Hindi
- No. of seasons: 1
- No. of episodes: 6

Production
- Producers: Sarita Patil; Sanjay Routray; Anubhav Sinha
- Cinematography: Ewan Mulligan; Ravi Kiran Ayyagari
- Editor: Amarjit Singh
- Camera setup: Multi-camera
- Running time: 28-46 mins
- Production companies: Matchbox Shots; Benaras Mediaworks

Original release
- Network: Netflix
- Release: 29 August 2024

IC 814: The Kandahar Hijack is 2024 Indian Hindi-language crime thriller drama television mini series about the hijacking of Indian Airlines Flight 814 in 1999. It is directed by Anubhav Sinha and written by Adrian Levy and Trishant Srivastava. Produced by Sarita Patil and Sanjay Routray under Matchbox Shots and Benaras Mediaworks, it stars an ensemble cast led by Vijay Varma, Naseeruddin Shah, Pankaj Kapur, Dia Mirza and Arvind Swamy. Ninad Kamat serves as narrator.

The series premiered globally on Netflix on 29 August 2024. It was the most watched show on Netflix for the first week of September.

== Plot ==
On Christmas eve in 1999, passengers board Indian Airlines flight 814 in Kathmandu, Nepal. As the plane makes its usual short-haul journey back to New Delhi, five Pakistani terrorists take over the flight, demanding the release of militants held in an Indian prison. IC 814 makes several stops in Amritsar, Lahore, and Dubai, before ending up in Kandahar, Afghanistan, where they are then confronted by the Taliban.

== Cast ==
=== IC 814 Crew ===
- Vijay Varma as Captain Sharan Dev, pilot-in-command of IC 814 (anagram of Devi Sharan)
- Karan Desai as First Officer Sunil Sachdeva, co-pilot of IC-814 (based on Rajinder Kumar)
- Girish Dhaneja as Flight Engineer Rajendra Nangia (based on Anil Jaggia)
- Mohit Shewani as Flight Purser Arun Kapoor (based on chief flight attendant Anil Sharma)
- Additi Gupta as Air Hostess Chhaya
- Patralekha as Air Hostess Indrani

=== IC 814 passengers ===
- Nikhil Angrish as Rupesh (based on Rupin Katiyal)

=== IC 814 hijackers ===
- Harry Parmar as Amjad Farooqui alias "Doctor" (hijacker)
- Diljhon Singh as Sunny Ahmed Qazi alias "Burger" (hijacker)
- Rajiv Thakur as Ibrahim Akhtar alias "Chief" (hijacker)
- Kunal Chopra as Zahoor Mistry alias "Bhola" (hijacker)
- Kamal Batra as Shakir alias "Shankar" (hijacker)

=== Miscellaneous ===
- Naseeruddin Shah as Cabinet Secretary Vinay Kaul, IAS (based on Prabhat Kumar)
- Pankaj Kapur as Vijaybhan Singh, Minister of External Affairs (based on Jaswant Singh)
- Arvind Swamy as Foreign Secretary D.R.Sivaramakrishnan aka DRS, IFS
- Dia Mirza as Shalini "Sha" Chandra, Editor of India Headlines
- Kumud Mishra as Ranjan Mishra, Joint Secretary of R&AW (based on Anand Arni)
- Manoj Pahwa as Mukul Mohan, Additional Director of IB
- Ujjawal Gauraha as Sarwar Mallik
- Aditya Srivastava as V K Agarwal, Head of R&AW (based on A. S. Dulat)
- Amrita Puri as Nandini Martin, Reporter of India Headlines newspaper
- Dibyendu Bhattacharya as Abhijeet Kumar, senior officer in MEA
- Pooja Gor as Simar Dev, Sharan's wife
- Kanwaljit Singh as J P Kohli, Director of IB
- Anupam Tripathi as Ram Chandra Yadav, R&AW agent in Kathmandu
- Yashpal Sharma as Sanjay Mehta, Assistant Director of IB
- Sushant Singh as Lt. General Ravi Shankar, Director General of NSG (cameo appearance)
- Mu'azzam Bhat as Wakil Ahmed Muttawakil, Foreign Minister of Afghanistan
- Asif Ali as Usmani
- Meer Sadhwani as Nabibullah Barkazai
- Ninad Kamat as Narrator

== Production ==
The series is adapted from the book Flight Into Fear by Devi Sharan and Srinjoy Chowdhury. In December 2023, a series on Amazon Prime Video was canceled due to the Tandav controversy.

In February 2024, the series was announced on Netflix. The trailer of this series was released on 19 August 2024.

Asian News International filed suit in India against Netflix in September 2024 for alleged use of their copyrighted material in the film footage.

== Reception ==
=== Critical response ===
Saibal Chatterjee of NDTV gave 3.5 stars out of 5 and stated that "Authentic and to the point, Vijay Varma starrer is as good a web series as any we have seen this year." Shubham Kulkarni of OTT Play gave the series 4/5 stars and stated "IC 814: The Kandahar Hijack doesn't forcefully create a hero and Anubhav Sinha wins exactly there when he honours each being who managed to save even themselves." Divya Raje Bhonsale of Mathrubhumi rated the series 4/5 stars and states "A gripping Netflix series based on the 1999 Kandahar hijack, 'IC 814' features an impressive ensemble cast and a razor-sharp script. Must-watch for fans of historical dramas." A critic for Bollywood Hungama rated the web series 3.5 stars out of 5 and wrote "On the whole, IC 814: The Kandahar Hijack sees the coming together of some of the most talented names of Indian cinema and also throws light on the shocking aspects of the 1999 hijack episode. Due to the taut execution, strong script and of course the ensemble cast, the show is sure to get a huge viewership."

Sukanya Verma of Rediff.com rated the series 3.5 stars out of 5 stars and notes "IC 814: The Kandahar Hijack begins by asking why the hijack lasted seven days and ends in wondering if the good guys fought the bad ones hard enough." Shubhra Gupta of The Indian Express gave the series 3/5 stars and notes "The Vijay Varma-Naseeruddin Shah-Pankaj Kapur show keeps it grounded, even when it’s in the air, and manages to distribute the tension evenly throughout." Shreyas Pande from Cinema Express rated the series 2.5 stars out of 5 stars and states "It’s a new leap here, as he (Anubhav Sinha) makes his web series debut and largely creates an engaging experience by showing nearly all that transpired during the dreadful hijack. Yet, something seems amiss. As the credits roll, you know certain information and it is just about enough to leave you curious. Nothing more, nothing less." Devansh Sharma of Hindustan Times notes "But in his (Anubhav Sinha) debut web series, he pulls off the Herculean task of telling a historical hijack story through a holistic, accurate, and non-judgemental lens." Anuj Kumar of The Hindu notes "Anubhav Sinha recreates the story of the longest hijack in Indian aviation history with precision, fairness and a touch of humanity."

=== Criticisms by experts, Indian officials and survivors ===
Several experts, high-ranking officers, senior journalists and the crew of the flight, including the former Research and Analysis Wing (RAW) chief A.S. Dulat and Former Indian High Commissioner to Pakistan, have criticized the series for its historical inaccuracies and not showing the passengers' perspective correctly.

Journalist Vir Sanghvi said the series misleadingly downplays the role of the Inter-Services Intelligence (ISI) to the point of serving as "propaganda" for the spy agency, and minimizes the threat posed by the hijackers. Historian Hindol Sengupta said the film is "pathetic", accusing the filmmakers of glorifying terrorism and failing to "acknowledge the long-term impact of the terrorists released during the hijacking, diminishing the severity of the real-life events", according to a report in the Swarajya.

Dulat told India Today TV "There’s no doubt that the ISI had a role in this. It wasn’t just based on our intelligence reports; a well-known Pakistani journalist was in Kandahar at the time. He reported that it was obvious the ISI was orchestrating and controlling the entire operation". G Parthasarathy, India's high commissioner to Pakistan at the time of the IC 814 hijacking, calls Sinha's portrayal of al-Qaida and Taliban roles "ridiculous". He said in an interview, "It was totally Pakistani involvement. The persons concerned were Pakistanis. The people they wanted released were Pakistanis. So there is no question of al-Qaida, that's the farthest thing to say".

The series also shows intelligence from the Kathmandu RAW team on a possible hijacking of an Indian aircraft reaching the agency's headquarters in Delhi, which has been denied by multiple officers of RAW, including Dulat.

The series is also criticized for its gentle portrayal of the hijackers, with hijackers being empathetic towards the injured crew and passengers on board, while in reality, the hijackers had killed a person onboard and stabbed a German citizen Satnam Singh.

The series also failed to show the hijackers' attempts to religiously convert the passengers on board. Ipseeta Menon, one of the survivors of the hijack, recalled how the hijackers tried to convert them. She said "The Netflix series has missed the long speeches by 'Doctor'[one of the hijackers]". She also said "The high tension among the passengers hasn't been captured well".

==== Names of terrorists ====
The series has been criticized for changing the Pakistani terrorists real names to code names and Hindu names. The identities of the five hijackers were determined to be Ibrahim Akhtar (from Bahawalpur), Shahid Akhtar Sayeed, Sunny Ahmed Qazi, Zahoor Mistry (all three from Karachi) and Shakir (from Sukkur). However, the series used their code names like Bhola, Shankar, Doctor, Burger, and Chief. This decision has led to accusations that the series downplays the identities of the terrorists, which some viewers argue dilutes the historical context and impact of the real events.

Journalist Neelesh Mishra, who has written a book on the hijacking, said "All the hijackers assumed false names. That is how they referred to each other and how the passengers referred to them throughout the hijacking". He clarified that he had not seen the series.

Following the public uproar, India's Ministry of Information and Broadcasting directed the content chief of Netflix India to appear before it and offer an explanation about the allegedly contentious aspects of the web series. Netflix responded by saying it would add new opening disclaimers to include the real and code names of the hijackers. However, some viewers outside India reported that this disclaimer was missing in version shown outside of India and was only present in the Indian version of it.
