= Pawni Pandey =

Indian singer

- Born: 1992 or 1993 (age 33–34); Jaipur, Rajasthan, India
- Musical career
- Genres: Filmi, Pop, Rock, Indian classical music.
- Occupation: Singer Live Performer
- Instrument: Vocals
- Years active: 2006–present
- Website: Pawni Pandey Official

Pawni Pandey is an Indian singer who was a contestant on Sa Re Ga Ma Pa L'il Champs and advanced to fifth place with public votes. She made her debut in the singing reality show Indian Idol. Post the reality show, she has sung a diverse number of songs in Bollywood films and is a live performer in both national and international shows.

She became more well known after her song "Laila Main Laila" from Raees became hit. She received significant amount of Indian media coverage due to her much acclaimed singing of the song. She then became a part of the Grand Jury for the singing reality show Sa Re Ga Ma Pa Lil Champs 2017.

== Early life and career ==
Pandey started singing from the age of 3 and at the age of 9 her parents recognised her talent and at the age of 10, her family migrated from Jaipur to Mumbai so that Pawni can pursue music seriously and get better opportunities. After moving to Mumbai, she participated in the "Sa Re Ga Ma Pa Lil Champs" where she was adjudged as the "Best Female Singer". However the music directors insisted her to give herself more time and get trained well as she was too young to make a career as a singer in Hindi cinema. She then got formally trained in Indian classical music, and received special training in western music from vocal dynamics trainer Thomas Appell from Los Angeles.

Her first major breakthrough came when she sang for the 2011 film Bodyguard. However, according to her, the singing career progressed slowly.

Pandey considers Lata Mangeshkar as an inspiration, among the current generation of musicians her favourites are Amaal Mallik, Sachin–Jigar and Arijit Singh.

== Discography ==
Year	Film	Songs	Music director(s)	Lyricist(s)	Co-singer(s)	Note(s)
2006	Ek Jind Ek Jaan	"Cheecho Cheech Ganeriyan"	Uttam Singh		Hans Raj Hans	Punjabi film
2009	Kisaan	"Jhoomo Re Jhoomo"	Daboo Malik		Daboo Malik, Tarranum Malik, Sujata Majumdar, Abhijit Ghoshal, ]	
2009	Rhyme Time in Toyland	"Mummy And Daddy"	Jayesh Gandhi		Ketki Pandey	Children's Day Special Album
2010	Do Dilon Ke Khel Mein	"Jaane Kyun Pyaar Mein (Remix)"	Daboo Malik		Daboo Malik	
2011	Jai Bolo Telangana	Eve Gaayam Ee Gaayam	Chakri		Chakri	Telugu film
2013	Policegiri	"Jhoom Barabar Jhoom"	Himesh Reshammiya	Shabbir Ahmed	Vinit Singh, Shabab Sabri, Aman Trikha	
2014	Gulaab Gang	"Sharm Laaj"	Soumik Sen, Sadhu Sushil Tiwari		Malabika Brahma	
2014	Fugly	"Lovely Jind Wali"				
2015	Manjhi - The Mountain Man	"Gehlore Ki Goriya"	Sandesh Shandilya		Bhavin Shastri	
2015	Meeruthiya Gangsters	Naina Tose Lage" (Female Version)				
2015	Mere Genie Uncle	"Ishq Hai Khufiapanti"	Dlima Nyzel			
2017	Raees	"Laila Main Laila"	Kalyanji–Anandji, Ram Sampath	Javed Akhtar, Indevaar		
2017	Phillauri	"Sahiba"	Shashwat Sachdev		Romy	
2017	Behen Hogi Teri	"Teri Yaadon Mein"	Yash Narvekar		Yasser Desai, Shubhanshu Kesharwani, Yash Narvekar	
2017	Bareilly Ki Barfi	"Sweety Tera Drama"	Tanishk Bagchi		Dev Negi, Shraddha Pandit	
2017	Julie 2	"Kharama Kharama"	Viju Shah		Solo	
2017	Anaarkali of Aarah	"Aye Sakhi Ooh"	Rohit Sharma	Ramkumar Singh		
2017	Anaarkali of Aarah	"Sa Ra Ra Ra"	Rohit Sharma	Ravinder Randhawa		
2017	Anaarkali of Aarah	"Mera Balam Bambaiya"	Rohit Sharma	Avinash Das		
2018	Blackmail	"Bewafa Beauty"	Amit Trivedi			
2018	Bhaiaji Superhit	"Baby Jaanlewa Hai"	Amjad-Nadeem		Yasser Desai	
2018	When Obama loved Obama	"Botal Brand New"				
2019	Chaal Gazab Hai	"Chaal Gazab Hai"			Prince Yadav	
2020	Guns of Banaras	"Dheere Dheere Se"	Sohail Sen	Sameer	Mohit Chauhan	
2020	Footfairy	"Andhera Unplugged"	Jeet Gannguli	Rashmi Virag		
2022	Liger	"Akdi Pakdi"	Lijo George-DJ Chetas, Sunil Kashyap	Mohsin Shaikh	Dev Negi	
