= Dosti Zindabad =

- Directed by: Partho Ghosh
- Written by: Sohail Akhtar
- Produced by: Ashish Maheshwari; Shruti Maheshwari
- Starring: Dev Sharma; Rahuul Chuwdhary; Shakti Kapoor; Mohan Joshi; Ayub Khan; Kiran Kumar; Shraddha Sharma
- Cinematography: Akram Khan
- Music by: Sachin Anand; Biswajit Bhattacharjee
- Production company: Shreya Cine Vision Presents
- Distributed by: BIG Curtains Media Pvt. Ltd
- Release date: 22 November 2019
- Country: India
- Language: Hindi

Dosti Zindabad is a 2019 Indian Hindi-language drama film directed by Partho Ghosh and produced by Ashish Maheshwari and his wife, Shruti Maheshwari. The film features Dev Sharma, Rahuul Chuwdhary, Shraddha Sharma and Shakti Kapoor in the lead roles. It was released on 22 November 2019.

== Cast ==
- Dev Sharma as Sunny
- Rahuul Chuwdhary as Angad
- Shakti Kapoor
- Mohan Joshi
- Ayub Khan
- Kiran Kumar
- Shraddha Sharma
- Ahsan Khan
- Sakshi Maggo as Sonia
