= Raat Baaki Hai =

- Promotional poster
- Directed by: Avinash Das
- Written by: Akhilesh Jaiswal; Siddharth Mishra
- Produced by: Samar Khan
- Starring: Rahul Dev; Anup Soni; Paoli Dam; Dipannita Sharma
- Cinematography: Manoj Soni
- Edited by: Archit D Rastogi
- Distributed by: ZEE5
- Release date: 16 April 2021
- Running time: 89 minutes
- Country: India
- Language: Hindi

Raat Baaki Hai is a ZEE5 Hindi thriller movie starring Rahul Dev, Anup Soni, Paoli Dam, Saanand Verma and Dipannita Sharma directed by Avinash Das. Based on Atul Satya Koushik’s Hindi play Ballygunge 1990, the film is set in Rajasthan. The film is about a murder investigation of a top actress, who was found murdered in the suite of the hotel where she was engaged.

== Plot ==
On their engagement night, film writer Kartik Sharma's (Anup Soni) fiancée, famous actress Vaani Chopra (Dipannita Sharma), is brutally murdered in her hotel room. Police officer Rajesh Ahlawat (Rahul Dev) arrives at the scene and takes charge of the investigation. Initial findings reveal that Kartik is the only person missing among the attendees of the engagement, making him the prime suspect. Meanwhile, Rajesh is maintaining regular phone communication, updating someone about the progress of the investigation.

In a state of panic, Kartik runs through the city and manages to seek help from a passing car. He explains to the driver that he is attempting to escape a serious problem without involving the police.

At the crime scene, the police focus their attention on a new suspect, film producer Rehan Mustafa (Saurabh Sachdeva) who launched Vaani. CCTV footage reveals that during the engagement, Rehan had a confrontation with Kartik due to his inappropriate behaviour towards Vaani. Rehan denies the murder accusation, admitting to his past relationship with Vaani. Witnessing Vaani's engagement to another man triggered his emotional response. The CCTV footage shows Rehan walking towards Vaani and Kartik's room later that night, but mysteriously, the footage is missing beyond that point. Rehan claims he intended to apologise to Vaani and Kartik but turned back before reaching their room.

As the car Kartik is in approaches a police checkpoint, he becomes anxious and asks the driver to avoid it. The driver, named Manohar, becomes suspicious by Kartik's behavior and asks him to exit the car. He suggests that Kartik seek help from the king Raja Sujan Singh, who resides nearby. Kartik complies.

Upon reaching Raja Sujan Singh's residence, Kartik is surprised to discover that his ex-girlfriend, Vashuki (Paoli Dam), is now the King's wife and Queen. Vashuki informs Kartik that the King is away and requests him to wait for his return. Kartik confesses to Vashuki that he was intoxicated earlier and woke up to find Vani dead with a knife in his hand. Due to excessive alcohol consumption, he experienced a blackout and cannot recall what happened. He cannot even be certain whether he killed Vaani or not.

The police later dismiss Rehan as a suspect when a waitress provides testimony affirming that Vani was seen alive by her after Rehan walked towards Vani's room. The waitress further confirms Rehan's intention to apologise to Vani and Kartik.

Through phone surveillance, the police learn that Kartik may be hiding in the King's residence, prompting them to head there for investigation. On their way, Rajesh narrates untold stories surrounding the murder to his colleague. A few days before the engagement, Vaani was having an affair with Raja Sujan Singh, and the person Rajesh keeps updating about the investigation is none other than the King himself.

At the King's residence, Vashuki reveals more details to Kartik about the murder. After discovering the King's affair with Vaani, Vashuki became consumed by jealousy and desperation. She confesses to being the one who killed Vaani with the help of a waitress and planted the knife in Kartik's hand. Additionally, she admits to killing King Sujan Singh moments before Kartik's arrival. Earlier, Vashuki showed Kartik a knife that she claims to be an expensive souvenir she bought in Istanbul. She tricked Kartik into touching that knife, leaving his fingerprints on the handle. Now she reveals that knife is the same weapon she used to kill the King, so Kartik will be taken as the prime suspect.

Overwhelmed, Kartik loses control and attempts to strangle Vashuki just as the police arrive and arrest him. Vashuki successfully frames Kartik for the murders of Raja Sujan Singh and Vaani.

== Cast ==
- Rahul Dev as Rajesh Ahlawat
- Anup Soni as Kartik Sharma
- Paoli Dam as Vasuki Singh
- Dipannita Sharma as Vaani Chopra
- Saurabh Sachdeva as Rehan Mustafa
- Sameer Malhotra as Raja Sujan Singh
- Aakash Dahiya as S.I. Sangram Singh
- Saanand Verma as Manohar

== Release ==
Raat Baaki Hai premiered on ZEE5 on 16 April 2021.

== Reception ==
Vibhor from Freepress Journal wrote a review with title "It’s better to go to sleep than watch this". He expanded: "The best part about this one hour forty minute film is that it is for one hour forty minutes only. It would have been a real task to sit through another five minutes of this snoozefest." Archika Khurana from Times of India wrote "Raat Baaki Hai circles around a murder investigation and the existing lives of the lead characters which could have been an interesting watch but it lacks the right elements to entertain. Despite some known faces and convincing acts, it comes across as a not-so-thrilling suspense drama." Inext wrote about the film "Raat Baaki Hai claims to be a suspense thriller drama but it is not suspense thriller from any angle. When you can predict what's going to happen next only by seeing the face of artists, you don't call such films thrillers but scam." Tatsam Mukherjee from Firstpost stated the film as "a simple murder mystery with no element of intrigue or entertainment".
