= Vijay Varma =

Indian actor (born 1986)

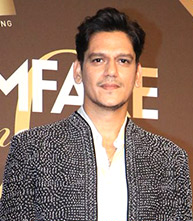
- Varma in 2025
- Born: 29 March 1986 (age 40); Hyderabad, Andhra Pradesh, India
- Education: Film and Television Institute of India
- Occupation: Actor
- Years active: 2008–present

Vijay Varma is an Indian actor who works predominantly in Hindi films and series. He graduated from the Film and Television Institute of India, before gaining recognition with the crime drama film Pink (2016). This was followed by supporting roles in Middle Class Abbayi (2017), Gully Boy (2019) and Baaghi 3 (2020). His performance in the former earned him a nomination for the Filmfare Award for Best Supporting Actor.

Varma has since starred in several streaming projects, including Mirzapur (2020–present), Darlings (2022), Dahaad (2023), Kaalkoot (2023), Jaane Jaan (2023), and IC 814: The Kandahar Hijack (2024). For his performance in the series Dahaad, he won the Filmfare OTT Award for Best Actor in a Drama Series (Critics).

== Early life and education ==
Varma was born on 29 March 1986 in a Marwari business family settled in Hyderabad, India. He attended St. Theresa High School and later studied at the FTII.

== Career ==
Varma began his acting career in theatre in his hometown of Hyderabad. Aspiring to receive formal training, he attended the Film and Television Institute of India (FTII) in Pune for two years. Upon graduation, Varma relocated to Mumbai to pursue a career in film and television.

=== 2008–2015: Early work and film debut ===
Varma's first on-screen appearance was in the short film Shor (2008), which garnered accolades at various film festivals, including Best Short Film at the MIAAC festival in New York. He made his television debut in 2010 with a role in the YRF Television series Rishta.com. His feature film debut came with the historical drama Chittagong (2012), where he portrayed the revolutionary Subodh "Jhunku" Roy. He subsequently took on supporting roles in films such as Rangrezz (2013) and Gang of Ghosts (2014).

=== 2016–2018: Breakthrough with Pink and supporting roles ===
Varma achieved his first major recognition with Aniruddha Roy Chowdhury's social thriller Pink (2016). His portrayal of Ankit Malhotra, one of the antagonists, was widely noted by critics and contributed to the film's critical and commercial success, marking a significant turning point in his career. He then starred in the lead role of a conflicted rookie cop in the neo-noir thriller Monsoon Shootout (2017). The film premiered at the 2013 Cannes Film Festival but was released theatrically in India in 2017. The same year, Varma made his debut in Telugu cinema as the antagonist Siva Shakti opposite Nani in Middle Class Abbayi (MCA), which proved to be a commercial success. He also appeared in Raag Desh (2017) and Manto (2018).

=== 2019–present: Wider acclaim and rise in prominence ===
Varma's career gained further momentum with Zoya Akhtar's musical drama Gully Boy (2019). His performance as Moeen Arif, a complex character who is both a friend and a morally ambiguous figure, received widespread critical acclaim and earned him a nomination for the Filmfare Award for Best Supporting Actor. This role solidified his reputation as a versatile actor. He also made a special appearance in Super 30 (2019).

In 2020, Varma expanded his presence across films and streaming platforms. He was part of Zoya Akhtar's segment in the Netflix horror anthology Ghost Stories and played a supporting role in the action film Baaghi 3. He took on leading roles in the ZEE5 films Bamfaad, as an antagonist, and Yaara. A significant milestone in his streaming career came with his dual role as twin brothers Bharat Tyagi and Shatrughan Tyagi in the second season of the popular Amazon Prime Video crime series Mirzapur, where his performance was well-received. During this period, he also featured in the BBC One adaptation of A Suitable Boy as Rasheed, a university lecturer, and had a recurring role as Sasya, a narcotics dealer, in the Netflix crime drama She.

Varma continued to showcase his range with projects like the Disney+ Hotstar sci-fi comedy series OK Computer (2021), where he played cybercrime detective Saajan Kundu. In 2022, he garnered significant critical acclaim for his portrayal of Hamza Shaikh, an abusive husband, in the Netflix black comedy film Darlings, co-starring Alia Bhatt and Shefali Shah. The year 2023 was particularly notable for Varma, with several high-profile releases. He received widespread praise and the Filmfare OTT Award for Best Actor in a Drama Series (Critics) for his role as Anand Swarnakar, a mild-mannered serial killer, in the Amazon Prime Video crime thriller series Dahaad. He then starred as Sub-inspector Ravi Shankar Tripathi in the JioCinema crime drama series Kaalkoot, tackling the issue of acid attacks. In film, he co-starred with Kareena Kapoor Khan and Jaideep Ahlawat in Sujoy Ghosh's Netflix thriller Jaane Jaan, playing Inspector Karan Anand. He also featured in Ghosh's segment "Sex With Ex" in the Netflix anthology Lust Stories 2.

In 2024, Varma appeared in the ensemble cast of Homi Adajania's mystery-comedy Murder Mubarak for Netflix. He also portrayed Captain Sharan (based on Captain Devi Sharan) in the historical thriller series IC 814: The Kandahar Hijack, also for Netflix, which depicted the 1999 Indian Airlines flight hijacking. His upcoming projects include the film Gustaakh Ishq.

== Personal life ==
Varma has a keen interest in fashion, drawing style inspiration from actors such as Daniel Day-Lewis and Jackie Chan. In an interview with Vogue India, he expressed admiration for Day-Lewis's wardrobe as a form of personal storytelling and cited Chan's monochrome costuming as an influence. His experimental fashion sense has been praised for its versatility. He enjoys traveling and exploring diverse cuisines, often discussing his love for cities like Hyderabad for its culinary blend of Mughlai and South Indian cuisine, as well as Mumbai and Shillong for their cultural appeal. His engagement with food cultures was highlighted in a discussion on regional cuisines with Sonakshi Sinha. In April 2025, Varma moved into a new sea-facing apartment in Juhu, Mumbai, marking a personal milestone. The move, reported by multiple sources, reflects his rising success in the film industry.

== Artistry ==
"The only criteria is the script, the role and then the director. I added one more after working for a few years and that was ‘I can’t repeat myself’. I’m trying to kind of mix it up. I’m just very happy that I have a medium, an audience. As long as I have an audience, I want to keep doing good work."

— Varma explaining his approach to film acting

Varma is known for his critically acclaimed roles and while he has successfully portrayed the bad guy on screen many times, he is known for his versatility, with Karan Johar saying, "Vijay Varma's versatility can take him to all kinds of places in the world".

Jitesh Pillai of Filmfare noted, "Vijay is a method actor who somehow fits seamlessly into commercial films." He further praised his "self-deprecating humour". Tatsam Mukherjee of Film Companion stated, "There's something compelling about the way he brings out the dark, repulsive shades of the roles he plays." Prateek Sur of Outlook India praises that actor for his "versatility" and "impactful performances". Praising his "flawless" acting, Akshat Sundrani of India TV News added, "Varma's passion for his craft and outstanding ability to express emotions solidify him as one of the most accomplished performers in the film industry." Bangalore Mirror termed him one of Bollywood’s "most enigmatic and skilled actors". His performance in Gully Boy is regarded as one of the "100 Greatest Performances of the Decade" by Film Companion.

== Filmography ==
Key
†	Denotes films that have not yet been released

=== Films ===
- All films are in Hindi unless otherwise noted.

Year	Title	Role	Notes	Ref
2008	Shor	Ramesh	Short film	
2012	Chittagong	Subodh "Jhunku" Roy		
2013	Rangrezz	Pakkya		
2014	Gang of Ghosts	Robin Hoodda		
2016	Pink	Ankit Malhotra		
2017	Monsoon Shootout	Aditya "Adi"		
2017	Raag Desh	Jamal Kidwai		
2017	MCA	Shiva Shakti alias "Warangal" Shiva	Telugu film	
2018	Manto	Ansaar Shabnam Dil		
2019	Gully Boy	Moeen Arif		
2019	Super 30	Fugga Kumar	Special appearance	
2020	Ghost Stories	Guddu	Zoya Akhtar's segment	
2020	Baaghi 3	Akhtar Lahori		
2020	Bamfaad	Jigar Fareedi		
2020	Yaara	Rizwan Sheikh		
2022	Hurdang	Loha Singh		
2022	Darlings	Hamza Shaikh		
2023	Lust Stories 2	Vijay Chauhan	Segment: "Sex With Ex "	
2023	Jaane Jaan	Inspector Karan Anand		
2024	Murder Mubarak	Aakash Dogra		
2025	Gustaakh Ishq	Nawabuddin Saifuddin Rahman / Pappan		
2026	Lust Stories 3	Hemant		

=== Series ===
Year	Title	Role	Notes	Ref
2010	Rishta.com	Rohit Gupta		
2018	Cheers-Friends, Reunion, Goa	Ciggy		
2020	A Suitable Boy	Rasheed		
2020	She	Sasya		
2020–present	Mirzapur	Bharat Tyagi / Shatrughan Tyagi	Season 2, 3	
2021	OK Computer	Saajan Kund		
2023	Dahaad	Anand Swarnakar		
2023	Kaalkoot	SI Ravi Shankar Tripathi		
2024	IC 814: The Kandahar Hijack	Captain Sharan		
2026	Matka King	Brij Bhatti "Matka King"		
TBA	Family Business †	Sid Mehta	Netflix series	

== Awards and nominations ==
List of award nominations and awards won by Vijay Varma
Year	Award	Category	Film	Result	Ref.
2019	26th Screen Awards	Best Supporting Actor	Gully Boy	Nominated	
2020	65th Filmfare Awards	Best Supporting Actor	Gully Boy	Nominated	
2023	Bollywood Hungama Style Icons	Most Stylish Emerging Icon	—N/a	Won	
2023	Bollywood Hungama Style Icons	Most Stylish Breakthrough Talent (Male)	—N/a	Nominated	
2023	Filmfare OTT Awards	Best Actor in a Series (Critics) Drama	Dahaad	Won	
2023	Filmfare OTT Awards	Best Actor in a Drama series	Dahaad	Nominated	
2023	Filmfare OTT Awards	Best Actor (Web Original Film)	Darlings	Nominated	
