= Aashram =

Indian crime drama web series

- Updated official poster
- Genre: Crime thriller; Procedural drama; Political thriller; Mystery
- Screenplay by: Kuldeep Ruhil; Tejpal Singh Rawat; Avinash Kumar; Madhvi Bhatt
- Story by: Habib Faisal
- Directed by: Prakash Jha
- Starring: Bobby Deol
- Voices of: Sanjay Masoom
- Composers: Songs: Sunny Inder; Background Score: Advait Nemlekar
- Country of origin: India
- Original language: Hindi
- No. of seasons: 4
- No. of episodes: 33

Production
- Producer: Prakash Jha
- Production location: India
- Cinematography: Chandan Kowli
- Editor: Santosh Mandal
- Camera setup: Multi-camera
- Production company: Prakash Jha Productions

Original release
- Network: MX Player
- Release: 28 August 2020 – present

Aashram (English: Hermitage) or Ek Badnaam Aashram (English: An infamous hermitage) is an Indian Hindi-language crime drama web series directed by Prakash Jha for MX Player original. It is produced by Prakash Jha under Prakash Jha Productions. The series stars Bobby Deol along with Aaditi Pohankar, Darshan Kumar, Chandan Roy Sanyal, Tushar Pandey, Anupriya Goenka, Adhyayan Suman, Vikram Kochhar, Esha Gupta, Tridha Choudhury, Rajeev Siddhartha, Sachin Shroff, Anurita Jha, Parinitaa Seth, Jahangir Khan, Kanupriya Gupta, Preeti Sood, Navdeep Tomar and Ayaan Aditya, in key roles. It is written by Madhvi Bhat,Avinash Kumar, Sanjay Masoomm, Tejpal Singh Rawat and Kuldeep Ruhil. Its first season was made available for streaming on the OTT platform MX Player for free from 28 August 2020.

The second season of the series was released on MX Player on 11 November 2020, with the third season following in June 2022, respectively. The series has been renewed for a fourth season in 2023.

== Summary ==
The story revolves around a godman, Baba Nirala (Bobby Deol), whose followers (mostly from the disadvantaged sections of society) have blind faith in him and will do anything that he asks of them. In reality, he is a conman who ensures that his devotees devote their wealth to him and stay attached to his ashram for life. Politicians Hukum Singh (Sachin Shroff) and incumbent CM Sundar Lal (Anil Rastogi) vie for Baba Nirala's support in the upcoming State Legislative Assembly Elections owing to his large number of followers for their vote bank politics, which only increases after a pop singer, Tinka Singh (Adhyayan Suman) decides to conduct tours with Baba Nirala to promote his new song.

Meanwhile, SI Ujagar Singh (Darshan Kumar) is a police officer who has little interest in his job and simply follows his seniors' orders, until he meets Dr. Natasha (Anupriya Goenka) in a case related to a skeleton found on the property of an industrial group which has good ties with Sundar Lal. Her constant pestering, along with the stubbornness of a small-time journalist Akhivendra Rathi alias Akki (Rajeev Siddhartha) encourages him to take up this case, along with his assistant senior constable Sadhu Sharma (Vikram Kocchar).

== Cast ==
- Bobby Deol as Kashipur Waale Baba Nirala / Monty Singh
- Chandan Roy Sanyal as Bhupendra “Bhopa Swami” Singh
- Aaditi Pohankar as Parminder “Pammi” Lochan
- Tushar Pandey as Satwinder “Satti” Lochan
- Darshan Kumar as Sub-Inspector Ujagar Singh
- Anupriya Goenka as Dr. Natasha Katariya
- Tridha Choudhury as Babita Lochan
- Vikram Kochhar as Senior Constable Sadhu Sharma
- Rupesh Kumar Charan Pahari as Nonny, pammi Cousin
- Anil Rastogi as Ex - CM Sundar Lal
- Sachin Shroff as Chief Minister Hukum Singh
- Anurita Jha as Kavita
- Kanupriya Gupta as Mohini and Sohini, twin sisters
- Rajeev Siddhartha as Akhivendra “Akki” Rathi
- Jahangir Khan as Michael Rathi, Monty's henchman
- Adhyayan Suman as Tinka Singh, a famous pop singer
- Keshav Pandit as Kavita's father
- Mala Sinha as Kavita's mother
- Navdeep Tomar as Sunny, Monty's henchman
- Subrato Roy as Goyal, Ashram Head administrator
- Preeti Singh as Sangeeta
- Ayaan Aditya as Ravindra Rawat alias RR
- Esha Gupta as Sonia, Hukum Singh's Beau and international brand building expert
- Hemant Choudhary as I.G. Sumit Chauhan
- Akash Singh Rajput as Rocky

== Series overview ==
Season	Episodes		Originally released
1	9		August 28, 2020
2	9		November 11, 2020
3	15	10	June 3, 2022
3	15	5	February 28, 2025

=== Season 1 (2020) ===
No.	Title	Directed by	Written by	Original release date
1	"Pran Pratishtha(amar)"	Prakash Jha	Habib Faisal	28 August 2020
2	"Grih Pravesh"	Prakash Jha	Habib Faisal	28 August 2020
3	"Duh Swapna"	Prakash Jha	Habib Faisal	28 August 2020
4	"Sewa Daar"	Prakash Jha	Habib Faisal	28 August 2020
5	"Amrit Sudha"	Prakash Jha	Habib Faisal	28 August 2020
6	"Vish Haran"	Prakash Jha	Habib Faisal	28 August 2020
7	"Gati Rodh"	Prakash Jha	Habib Faisal	28 August 2020
8	"Shuddhi Karan"	Prakash Jha	Habib Faisal	28 August 2020
9	"Maha Prasad"	Prakash Jha	Habib Faisal	28 August 2020

=== Season 2 (2020) ===
No.	Title	Directed by	Written by	Original release date
1	"Triya - Charitra"	amarnath	Habib Faisal	11 November 2020
2	"Chhadma - Vesh"	Prakash Jha	Habib Faisal	11 November 2020
3	"Naag - Paash"	Prakash Jha	Habib Faisal	11 November 2020
4	"Mrig - Trishna"	Prakash Jha	Habib Faisal	11 November 2020
5	"Kaliya - Mardan"	Prakash Jha	Habib Faisal	11 November 2020
6	"Chhadma - Yudhha"	Prakash Jha	Habib Faisal	11 November 2020
7	"Moh - Bhang"	Prakash Jha	Habib Faisal	11 November 2020
8	"Koot - Neeti"	Prakash Jha	Habib Faisal	11 November 2020
9	"Chakra - Vaat"	Prakash Jha	Habib Faisal	11 November 2020

=== Season 3 (Part 1 - 2022 and Part 2 - 2025) ===
No.	Title	Directed by	Written by	Original release date
1	"Indra - Prastha"	Prakash Jha	Hassam Tariq	3 June 2022
2	"Chakravyu"	Prakash Jha	Hassam Tariq	3 June 2022
3	"Charan - Kamal"	Prakash Jha	Hassam Tariq	3 June 2022
4	"Guru - Dakshina"	Prakash Jha	Hassam Tariq	3 June 2022
5	"Kaam - Vatika"	Prakash Jha	Hassam Tariq	3 June 2022
6	"Swarg - Lok"	Prakash Jha	Hassam Tariq	3 June 2022
7	"Halahal"	Prakash Jha	Hassam Tariq	3 June 2022
8	"Kuchakra"	Prakash Jha	Hassam Tariq	3 June 2022
9	"Shankh - Naad"	Prakash Jha	Hassam Tariq	3 June 2022
10	"Mahabhiyog"	Prakash Jha	Hassam Tariq	3 June 2022
11	"Kopa - Bhavan"	Prakash Jha	TBD	28 February 2025
12	"Prayashchit"	Prakash Jha	TBD	28 February 2025
13	"Prem - Paash"	Prakash Jha	TBD	28 February 2025
14	"Kaala - Sach"	Prakash Jha	TBD	28 February 2025
15	"Agni - Pareeksha"	Prakash Jha	TBD	28 February 2025

== Marketing and release ==
=== Promotion ===
The official trailer of the two seasons of this web series was launched on August 16, 2020 and October 29, 2020 respectively by MX Player on YouTube.

=== Release ===
Season 1 and Season 2 was made available for streaming from August 28, 2020 and November 11, 2020 respectively on OTT Platform MX Player. The series made its TV debut through The Q on October 11, 2021.

== Critical reception ==
Writing for NDTV, Saibal Chatterjee rated the series 3 out of 5 adding that “Prakash Jha's digital debut is ambitious, provocative and action-packed.” He praised the performances of actors and concept handling from the director Prakash Jha. Rohan Nahaar of Hindustan Times wrote that Aashram is “a show that doesn't have the courage of its convictions. The self-censorship of sex scenes is emblematic of the trepidation with which Jha approaches the story. As it turns out, that ridiculous disclaimer was utterly unnecessary.”

== Controversies ==
In December 2020, Jodhpur Court had served a legal notice to Bobby Deol and director Prakash Jha after Karni Sena filed a case on the actor and the director for hurting their sentiments and stated that the show "is an attempt to discredit Hinduism and Ashrams". In October 2021, the Bajrang Dal group targeted Aashram web series sets and Prakash Jha for defaming Hindus and the entire aashram system, through his web series, whereas the sets were vandalised by the group. Director Prakash Jha stated that "They will voice their concerns, but I think about the thousands who see my project in the correct manner. It is no joke that 1.5 billion people watched it. If we say there will be no objection, it is not right. " Later, Bobby Deol supported Jha and stated that the show is not about defaming anyone and as an actor nothing else matters.
