= Yaadon Ka Idiot Box =

Radio show in India

- Other names: Yaadon Ka Idiot Box With Neelesh Misra
- Running time: 120 minutes (9:00 pm – 11:00 pm)Monday to Friday
- Country of origin: India
- Languages: Hindi, Urdu
- Syndicates: BIG FM 92.7
- Hosted by: Neelesh Misra
- Written by: Neelesh Misra
- Original release: 2011 – 2020
- No. of series: 6
- Audio format: radio

Yaadon Ka Idiot Box is an Indian radio show launched by BIG FM 92.7, hosted by Neelesh Misra. The show was introduced by Big FM in 2011 and comprises story parts that are known as "seasons". YKIB stories involve listeners in an unreal world where they feel and remember what happened to them. Listeners in India and Pakistan encouraged the storytelling thought of Yaadon Ka Idiot Box, known as "Yaadon Ka Idiot Box With Neelesh Misra".

== Reception ==
Yaadon Ka Idiot Box became popular across both nations and later launched a book series that recounts Misra's imaginary stories. The books are commonly known as "Yaad Sheher". The words "Yaad" and "Sheher" are combinations of Urdu and Hindi words that mean "The city of memory or recollection".
