= Keep Safe Distance =

- Directed by: Raama Mehra
- Produced by: Vishnu Dhanraj Sharma; Mahesh Sharma; Laxman Singh Rajput (co-producer)
- Starring: Kiran Kumar; Shahbaz Khan; Mushtaq Khan
- Cinematography: S. Pappu
- Music by: Damodar Raao
- Release date: 15 November 2019
- Country: India
- Language: Hindi

Keep Safe Distance (transl. सुरक्षित दूरी बनाए रखें) is a 2019 Indian drama film directed by Raama Mehra with Kiran Kumar, Shahbaz Khan, Mushtaq Khan and Laxman Singh Rajput.

== Plot ==
The film shows life of a Call girl. Sonia, a little girl who lost her family due to flooding in Assam, arrives in Mumbai with her mother. Circumstances make the girl a famous Call girl as she grows up, and becomes famous as Sonia ATM (Sonia). Sonia also has relationships with underworld Don Salim Sultan. On one occasion, Sonia meets ACP Vijay Suryavanshi, who is looking for the underworld Don Salim Sultan. ACP Vijay asks Sonia to help him arrest Don Salim Sultan on the promise of marrying her, to which Sonia agrees. Sonia provides information about Don Salim Sultan's India tour to Vijay. Vijay reaches the spot to capture Don. Sonia shoots herself after hearing that Vijay refers to as a 'call girl'. Salim Sultan escapes and runs away from India. The film depicts Mumbai's crime, underworld and the film industry issues.

== Cast ==
- Kiran Kumar
- Shahbaz Khan
- Mushtaq Khan
- Adi Irani
- Vikas Anand
- Laxman Singh Rajput
- Jai Yadav
- Sagarika Neha
- Indrajeet Singh

== Filming ==
The film is mostly shot in Mumbai (Maharashtra), Gujarat, Rajasthan and some parts of Daman and Diu.

== Soundtrack ==
Keep Safe Distance

Soundtrack album by Damodar Rao
- Released: 1 November 2019
- Recorded: 2018–2019
- Venue: Red Bulb Studios
- Genre: Feature film soundtrack
- Length: 3:04
- Language: Hindi
- Label: Rama Dhanraj Production
External audio
- Video on YouTube

The music of the film is composed by Damodar Rao and sung by Kalpana Patowary while lyrics are by RPS Janaab.

Track listing
No.	Title	Singer(s)	Length
1.	"Twinkle Twinkle"	Kalpana Patowary	3:56
Total length:			3:56
