= Ziddi Ishq =

- Promotional poster
- Genre: Drama; Thriller
- Based on: Parineeta
- Written by: Digant Patil; Souvik Bhattacharya
- Directed by: Raj Chakraborty
- Starring: Aaditi Pohankar; Parambrata Chatterjee
- Country of origin: India
- Original language: Hindi
- No. of episodes: 7

Production
- Camera setup: Multi-camera
- Running time: 27–35 minutes

Original release
- Network: JioHotstar
- Release: 21 November 2025

Ziddi Ishq (transl. Stubborn Love) is a 2025 Indian Hindi-language drama thriller television series created and directed by Raj Chakraborty. It is based on Bengali film Parineeta, and stars Aaditi Pohankar and Parambrata Chatterjee. The series premiered on JioHotstar on 21 November 2025.

== Cast ==
- Aaditi Pohankar as Mehul Bose
- Parambrata Chatterjee as Shekhar Da OR Shekhar Dutta
- Riya Sen as Sayantika Chatterjee
- Priyanshu Painyuli as Anand
- Shaji Choudhary as Raka
- Barkha Bisht as Mousumi Ganguly
- Bibriti Chatterjee as Atmika
- Sumeet Vyas as Siddharth Roy Chowdhury
- Riddhi Sen as Neel Bose
- Laboni Sarkar Mehul's mother
- Shankar Chakraborty Mehul's father

== Production ==
The series was announced on JioHotstar, a remake of the 2019 Bengali film Parineeta. Post-production of the series concluded in 2025.

== Reception ==
Divya Nair of Rediff.com awarded the series 1 stars out of 5 stars. Arpita Sarkar of OTTPlay rated the series 2/5 stars.
