= Q TV (Indian TV channel) =

Indian Hindi entertainment television channel

- Country: India
- Broadcast area: India
- Headquarters: Mumbai, India

Programming
- Language(s): Hindi
- Picture format: 576i SDTV

Ownership
- Owner: QYOU Media
- Sister channels: The Q Marathi; The Q Kahaniyan

History
- Launched: 24 June 2017; 8 years ago
- Former names: The Q

Links
- Website: Official Website

Q TV is an Indian Hindi language youth-centric entertainment channel owned by QYou Media. This channel shows some content from digital platforms like YouTube and MX Player. The channel was first launched as The Q, an Indian youth channel that primarily broadcast in Hindi on 24 June 2017. The Q was rebranded as Q TV on 9 June 2023.

== Programming ==
=== TV shows ===
- Baal Veer
- Sweety Special
- Baklolbaklol
- Thari Bijli
- Jila Lotapur
- Tenali Rama

=== Animated stories ===
- Anokhi Kahaniyaan
- Daravani Kahaniyaan
- Dilchasp Kahaniyaan
- Gazab Kahaniyaan

== Former shows ==
=== Original show ===
- Jurm Ka Chehra
- Mr Aur Mrs LLB
- Dil se connection
- Chushki Zindagi Ki
- Bhago Bhago Bhoot Aaya

=== Others ===
- Bak Bak Baklol
- Chu Chu Ke Fans
- Food For Foodies
- Seema's Smart Kitchen
- Aashram
- Prank By UngliBaaz
- Total Indian Drama
- Aastik Ek Viswas
- Lit Cook Off
- Kanak's Kitchen
- Curly tales food
- Elvish Yadav
- Badhiya hai
- Dhaakad codies
- Faridabad Rockers
- Ridhu Pidhu
- Ankush Kasana
- This Is Sumesh
- Yo Yo Yogesh
- Hasi Ka HAHAkaar
- Ulat Pulat

=== Animated shows ===
- Akbar Birbal
- Mahabharat
- Ramayan
- Divya Kathayein
- Maskhari
- Kisso Ka Khazana
- Shiny Aur Shasha
- Khooni Mondays
- Horrid Henry

=== Animated comedy shows ===
- Nattu
