= Dvand: The Internal Conflict =

- Official release poster
- Directed by: Ishtiyak Khan
- Written by: Ishtiyak Khan
- Produced by: Vikas Vashistha; Rohandeep Singh
- Starring: Sanjay Mishra; Ishtiyak Khan
- Cinematography: Chandra Shekhar Rath
- Edited by: Sandeep Singh Bajeli
- Music by: Rohit Sharma
- Production companies: Jumping Tomato Studios; Vsquare Films
- Release date: 29 September 2023
- Country: India
- Language: Hindi

Dvand: The Internal Conflict is a 2023 Indian Hindi-language drama film written and directed by Ishtiyak Khan. It stars Ishtiyak Khan, Sanjay Mishra, Vikram Kochhar and Ipshita Chakraborty. It was released theatrically on 29 September 2023.

== Cast ==
- Ishtiyak Khan as Bhola
- Vishwanath Chatterjee as Bhaiyaji
- Sanjay Mishra as Guruji
- Ipshitaa as Naini
- Tina Bhatia as Raziya
- Vikram Kochhar
- Faiz Khan Raziya's husband

== Production ==
Dvand: The Internal Conflict was shot in Jharkhand

== Plot summary ==
The movie is a comedic adaptation of Shakespeare's play, "Othello," combining elements of humor and adventure.

== Reception ==
=== Critical response ===
A reviewer of The Free Press Journal wrote "However, the internal conflict, competitive and jealousy in the minds of people can be watched at least once to encourage the makers". Ritu Tripati from India TV wrote "it definitely feels like it has been drawn forcibly. But if you like realistic acting and down-to-earth characters then you will surely enjoy it". Rahul Chouhan from Aaj Tak wrote "If you want to watch a serious 'low' comedy film showing social evils, then you will like 'Dwand The Internal Conflict'". Shikha Yadav from NDTV says "Like the story of the film, its direction has also been done well. But at some places the story starts getting a bit slow and boring and looking at some scenes it seems as if an attempt has been made to add them forcefully". Priya Shukla from News18 India says "However, at some places the story seems to be lax. There are some scenes which look as if there was no need for this scene. As if it was just added forcefully".
