= Laxman Singh Rajput =

Indian actor (born 1992)

- Born: 10 August 1992 (age 33); Bharatpur, Rajasthan India
- Occupation(s): Film actor Film producer
- Years active: 2013–present

Laxman Singh Rajput (born 10 August 1992) is an Indian actor who appears in tv serials such as Savdhaan India and Jijaji Chhat Per Hain. He has shared the screen with Nawazuddin Siddiqui in Thackeray.

== Television ==
Year	Title	Role	Channel
2013	Savdhaan India	Nikhil	Life OK
2015	Crime Patrol	inspector	Sony TV
2018	Jijaji Chhat Per Hain	Paanwala	&TV

== Filmography ==
Key
†	Denotes films that have not yet been released

Year	Film	Role	Notes
2019	Firebrand	Dileep	Released on 22 February 2019
2019	Thackeray	Deewan Sahab	Released on 25 January 2019
2019	Bharat	Ramesh Malhotra	Released on 5 June 2019
2019	Chaal Gazab Hai	-	As producer
2019	Keep Safe Distance	Manmohan	As co-producer
2020	The Third Hacker	Raj	As actor
