= Chaal Gazab Hai =

- Film poster
- Directed by: Sagar Joshi
- Produced by: Laxman Singh Rajput
- Starring: Jannat Zubair Rahmani; Shivam Roy Prabhakar; Indrajeet Singh
- Distributed by: Zee Music Company
- Release date: May 27, 2019
- Country: India
- Language: Hindi

Chaal Gazab Hai (transl. चाल गज़ब है) is an Indian short musical drama film directed by Sagar Joshi and produced by Laxman Singh Rajput which was released by Zee Music Company. The musical drama stars Jannat Zubair Rahmani and Shivam Roy Prabhakar in the lead. Theme of the drama was sung by Bollywood singers Pawni Pandey and Prince Yadav.

== Cast ==
- Jannat Zubair Rahmani
- Shivam Roy Prabhakar
- Vinay Aditya Roy

== Music ==
The music of the film featured the song "Chaal Gazab Hai", which was composed by Vishal Srivastav and sung by Pawni Pandey and Prince Yadav while lyrics are by Harman Preet Singh. The single was sold under the Zee Music Company label.
