= Indian Airlines Flight 814 =

1999 Indian aircraft hijacking

- The hijacked plane at Kandahar with Taliban men in the foreground

Hijacking
- Date: 24 December 1999 – 31 December 1999
- Summary: Hijacking
- Site: Hijacked in Indian airspace en-route from Kathmandu to Delhi; Later landed at Amritsar, Lahore, Dubai and Kandahar

Aircraft
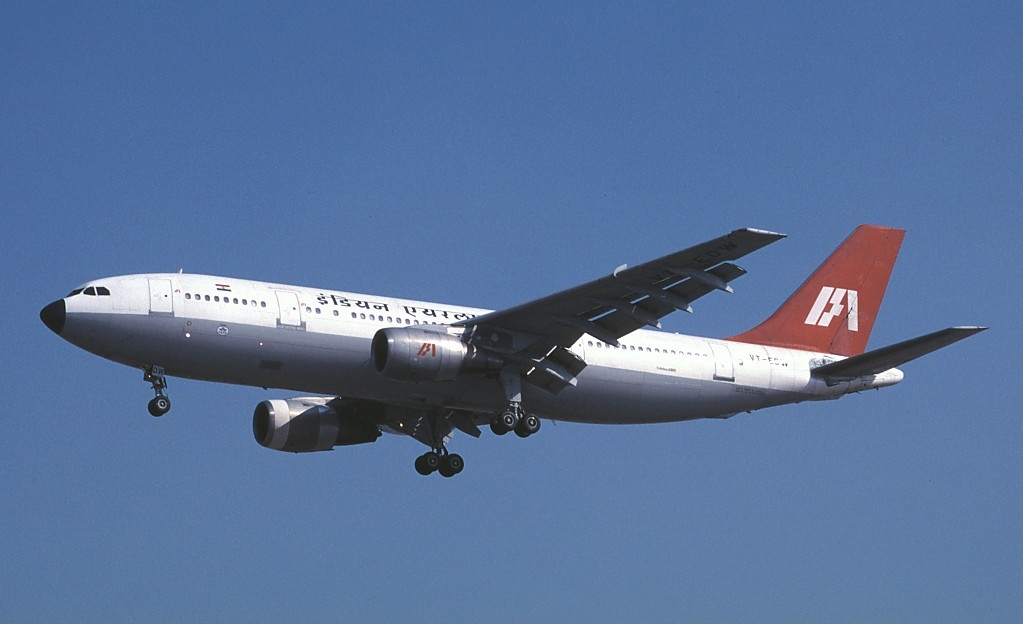
- The aircraft involved, VT-EDW, seen a few days after the hijacking
- Aircraft type: Airbus A300B2-101
- Operator: Indian Airlines
- IATA flight No.: IC814
- ICAO flight No.: IAC814
- Call sign: INDAIR 814
- Registration: VT-EDW
- Flight origin: Tribhuvan International Airport
- Destination: Indira Gandhi International Airport
- Occupants: 190
- Passengers: 179 (including 5 hijackers)
- Crew: 11
- Fatalities: 1
- Injuries: 17
- Survivors: 189

Indian Airlines Flight 814, commonly known as IC 814, was an Indian Airlines Airbus A300 that was hijacked on 24 December 1999 by five members of Harkat-ul-Mujahideen. The passenger flight, en route from Kathmandu to Delhi, was taken over shortly after it entered Indian airspace at about 16:53 IST. The aircraft had 190 occupants: 179 passengers and 11 crew members including Captain Devi Sharan, First Officer Rajinder Kumar, and Flight Engineer Anil Kumar Jaggia.

The aircraft was flown to Amritsar, Lahore, and Dubai. While in Dubai, the hijackers released 27 passengers plus the body of a male passenger whom the hijackers had stabbed multiple times at Amritsar. Later, on 25 December, the hijackers forced the pilots to land in Kandahar in Afghanistan. Most of Afghanistan, including Kandahar, was under the control of the Taliban at the time. External intervention was hindered by Taliban men encircling the aircraft, and by the presence of two officers from the Inter-Services Intelligence of Pakistan. On 27 December after two days of internal discussions, the Government of India sent a team of negotiators headed by Vivek Katju from the Ministry of Home Affairs, which included officials Ajit Doval and C. D. Sahay. After days of negotiations, India agreed to release three men it had imprisoned for terrorism – Ahmed Omar Saeed Sheikh, Masood Azhar and Mushtaq Ahmed Zargar – in exchange for the hostages.

The hostage crisis ended on 31 December when the passengers and crew were released after the Indian government handed the three prisoners over to the Taliban. Despite Indian expectations that the three former prisoners and the hijackers would be arrested, the men were driven to the Pakistan border and released, and they have since been suspected of involvement in other terrorism-related incidents such as the 2001 Indian Parliament attack, 2002 kidnapping and murder of Daniel Pearl, 2008 Mumbai attacks, 2016 Pathankot attack and the 2019 Pulwama attack. India's Central Bureau of Investigation (CBI) charged ten people in relation to the case (with whereabouts unknown for seven including the five hijackers), of whom only two were convicted and sentenced to life imprisonment. The hijacking is a part of the millennium attack plots in late 1999 and early 2000 by al-Qaeda linked terrorists.

== Background ==
=== Aircraft ===
The aircraft involved was an Airbus A300B2-101, registered as VT-EDW with serial number 036 and was powered by two General Electric CF6-50C engines. The aircraft carried 190 occupants which included 179 passengers and 11 crew members. The crew consisted of Captain Devi Sharan, First officer Rajinder Kumar, and Flight engineer Anil Kumar Jaggia. The passengers also included foreign nationals, amongst whom was Roberto Giori, the then-owner of De La Rue Giori, a company that controlled the majority of the world's currency-printing business at the time.

=== Hijackers ===
The flight carried five members of Harkat-ul-Mujahideen (HuM) amongst the passengers. As per the Ministry of External Affairs (India), the five perpetrators were later identified as Pakistani nationals Ibrahim Athar (from Bahawalpur), Shahid Akhtar Sayeed, Sunny Ahmed Qazi, Zahoor Mistry (all three from Karachi) and Shakir (from Sukkur). The hijackers used the code names Chief, Doctor, Burger, Bhola and Shankar respectively to refer to themselves.

Athar, the brother of Masood Azhar, along with his other brother Abdul Rauf Azhar and brother-in-law Yusuf Azhar, was involved in planning the hijacking.

HuM is an Islamist organisation based out of Pakistan. It had split from Harkat-ul-Jihad al-Islami (HuI) in 1985 before reuniting in 1993 to form Harkat-ul-Ansar (HuA). However, after HuA was declared a designated terrorist organisation by the United States in 1997, it changed its name back to Harkat-ul-Mujahideen. (Note: Jaish-e-Muhammad was formed as a splinter group of HuM by Masood Azhar in 2000.) After its leaders were arrested by the Indian Armed Forces in 1993, the organisation perpetrated various attacks and kidnappings in India to secure the release of their leaders imprisoned in India. These included the killing of two Indian Army personnel in 1994 and multiple incidents of kidnapping of Western tourists in 1994 and 1995.

Kathmandu had been a major operational base for Pakistan's Inter-Services Intelligence (ISI) and a hub for other illegal activities. Based on later investigation and statements from others arrested in connection with the incident, the incident was reportedly planned for over two months. The hijackers and their associates made several trips to Kathmandu during this period. The hijack was originally planned for 27 December 1999 but was moved forward later. The tickets for the hijackers were booked through three different tour agencies under false names, and the booking was altered on 13 December. Access to the airport was facilitated through Dawood Ibrahim.

== Hijacking ==
On 24 December 1999, the flight took off from Kathmandu en route to Delhi after 16:00 IST. It entered Indian airspace around 16:39, and the passengers and crew were being served refreshments. As chief steward Anil Sharma completed serving the pilots their refreshments, a man wearing a mask and brandishing a revolver and a grenade accosted him and demanded access to the cockpit. At 16:53, the pilot was told that the flight had been hijacked. The Delhi Air traffic control was informed of the situation at 16:56.

The hijackers instructed the flight captain to fly west towards Pakistani airspace. The Crisis Management Group (CMG) of the Government of India led by union secretary Prabhat Kumar was not convened immediately, and the information concerning the hijacking was not communicated at that time to the Intelligence Bureau and the Research & Analysis Wing (RAW). Prime Minister of India Atal Bihari Vajpayee was traveling during the incident and was briefed regarding the incident only after he landed in Delhi. He later called an emergency meeting to discuss the situation. Meanwhile, as per later accounts, the hijackers ordered the crew to take away the food that had been served, separated the male passengers from women and children, blindfolded them and threatened them with explosives if they did not cooperate.

=== Landing at Amritsar and passenger stabbings ===
At 18:04, captain Sharan radioed the Indian ATC that they had only one hour of fuel left and that the Pakistani ATC had refused permission to land the aircraft at Lahore. He implored the ATC to reach out to Pakistan, as the hijackers did not want to land in India and had threatened to execute ten hostages if their demands were not met. At 18:30, the High Commission of India, in Pakistan requested permission for the plane to land there, which was denied by the Government of Pakistan. At 18:25, the CMG informed the National Security Guard (NSG) to prepare for a possible rescue mission.

When informed of the fuel shortage, the hijackers allowed the captain to land at the Amritsar airport in India. At 18:44, the flight began its descent towards Amritsar, following a message from the captain to the Indian ATC and the CMG was informed of the same. The Indian Home Minister L. K. Advani and Director general of police for the state of Punjab Sarabjeet Singh both later stated that they came to know of the hijacking from the television news rather than being informed by the CMG. As per the official guidelines, Singh asked the Inspector general of the Amritsar area to take charge of the situation. As the officer was on leave, J.P. Birdi, who occupied the position previously, was sent to handle the situation.

At 19:10, as the NSG team was ready to take off to Amritsar, it had to wait as the government negotiators did not arrive in time. On landing at Amritsar, the captain requested immediate refueling of the aircraft. The hijackers refused to communicate with local police officials while the plane was at the airport. Later eyewitness accounts indicated that the hijackers, upset by the delay in refueling, stabbed passengers Satnam Singh and Rupin Katyal with a knife, causing several wounds. The captain made contact with the ATC four times, informing them that the hijackers were armed with Kalashnikov rifles and had begun killing hostages, and requested them to refuel the plane as fast as possible to prevent any additional deaths. Captain Sharan later stated that he had hoped that the ordeal would end with the assistance of Indian government and that the plane would not have to take off again from Amritsar.

=== Take-off to Lahore ===
The CMG directed the authorities to ensure that the plane was immobilised at any cost and armed personnel of the Punjab Police were put in position to ensure the same. Meanwhile, the aircraft engines were kept running and the plane stayed on the runway. A refueling bowser was finally dispatched and was parked to the side of the aircraft. As the aircraft started moving, it was ordered to block the aircraft from taking off and it narrowly missed hitting the plane. Then National Security Advisor Brajesh Mishra later revealed that the government had advised for a sniper to be hidden in the bowser, who could shoot if required to disable the plane. Later, it was revealed that this approach caused the hijackers to suspect that the refueling process would prevent their departure, and they ordered captain Sharan to take off immediately, resulting in the plane narrowly avoiding hitting the fuel tanker on the runway.

Eyewitness accounts later revealed that five passengers had been placed in seats towards the front with their hands bound, and the hijackers threatened that more hostages would be executed if the plane did not take off immediately. The captain later said that he had to make a decision so as to stop them from killing the passengers. Despite receiving no clearance to take-off, the plane left Amritsar airport at 19:47. Captain Sharan announced the departure to the ATC stating, "We are all dying." The NSG lifted off from Delhi at around 19:55 and arrived at the airport at 20:15 after the aircraft had departed.

On approaching Lahore, the aircraft again requested permission to land, which was denied by the Pakistani ATC. All the lights and navigational aids at the Lahore airport were turned off to prevent the plane from landing. As the plane had not been refueled in Amritsar, it was running out of fuel and captain Sharan indicated that he would have to crash-land the aircraft at Lahore. As he made an approach to land on a highway, believing it was the approach to the runway, the Pakistani ATC turned on the navigational aids and allowed the plane to land at the airport. The plane touched down in Lahore at 20:01. On receiving information that the plane had landed in Lahore, India sought a transport for the Indian High Commissioner Gopalaswami Parthasarathy to travel from Islamabad to Lahore and requested Pakistani authorities to ensure that the plane did not leave Lahore. The runway lights were again turned off to prevent the aircraft from taking off and Pakistani forces surrounded the plane.

According to Sharan, the hijackers were ready to release some women and children aboard the flight, but were denied permission by Pakistani authorities. Parthasarathy later stated that his repeated requests to stop the plane from taking off were not heeded by Pakistan and that he was delayed due to transport difficulties. By the time he arrived at the airport, the plane had been refueled and was allowed to leave. The plane took off from Lahore at around 22:32. The Indian officials contacted Pakistan for confirmation of reports that passengers on board had been killed, but received no response from the Pakistani authorities.

=== Diversion to Dubai ===
Upon departure from Lahore, the crew was asked to set a course for Kabul. However, as the Kabul Airport did not have any night landing facilities at the time, the captain expressed his inability to do so. As the plane flew west, most Gulf countries closed their air space to prevent the plane from landing. The flight was finally allowed to land at Al Minhad Air Base in Dubai and touched down at 01:32 on the next day. Following negotiations between the Emirate authorities and the hijackers, 27 passengers were released in exchange for re-fueling the aircraft. The body of the deceased 25-year-old Katyal, who had been stabbed earlier, was also offloaded at the air base. The released passengers, including Satnam Singh, who had also been attacked by the hijackers in Amritsar, and the body of Katyal were later flown to India on a special relief plane on 25 December.

While the plane was in Dubai, the Indian authorities wanted to attempt a rescue by Indian forces but the Emirate authorities refused permission. The authorities sent catering trucks in a bid to further delay the plane. However, the hijackers forced the captain to take off and the plane narrowly made it off the runway. Captain Sharan later opined that he could have chosen to crash the aircraft to prevent it from taking off, but it presented a fire risk as the plane was full of fuel and he could not have done it without the explicit permission of the authorities. The plane took off from Dubai at 6:20 IST in the morning.

=== Landing in Kandahar and negotiations ===
The aircraft landed at Kandahar Airport in Afghanistan at 08:33. Kandahar was under the control of Taliban and after the aircraft landed there, India had to negotiate with the Taliban authorities to reach out to the hijackers. India's lack of previous contact with the Taliban regime complicated the negotiating process. As India did not officially recognise the Taliban regime, it dispatched an official from its high commission in Islamabad to Kandahar with the United Nations also sending negotiators to assist in the situation. Armed members of the Taliban surrounded the aircraft, which raised doubts to the Indian authorities on the real intention of the Taliban. The Taliban maintained that the forces were deployed in an attempt to dissuade the hijackers from killing or injuring the hostages. However, military analysts believe it was done to prevent an Indian military operation against the hijackers.

On 25-26 December, India internally discussed their approach to negotiations, while passengers were still on board the flight. The plane's engine was running continuously to provide lighting and heating as the temperatures dropped during the night. Passengers later stated that they received irregular meals and had limited access to drinking water and sanitation facilities, and that the hijackers utilised the public announcement system on board the plane to proselytize to the passengers. Home minister Advani opposed any release of prisoners in exchange for the hostages, as this would affect the public opinion of the government, while Minister of External Affairs (India) Jaswant Singh advocated to negotiate with the Taliban. On 27 December, the Indian Government sent a team of negotiators headed by Vivek Katju, joint-secretary in the ministry of external affairs, along with officials Ajit Doval and C. D. Sahay.

The Indian negotiators saw that the Taliban had encircled the aircraft. Negotiations did not progress, as Taliban officials refused to allow Indian special forces to attempt a covert operation, and declined to conduct an operation by their own special forces. To prevent any military action, Taliban officials later surrounded the aircraft with military tanks. Doval later said that the hijackers were getting active support from ISI in Kandahar and that the ISI had handled the pressure the Indians were trying to put on the hijackers, meaning that their safe exit was guaranteed, and they had no need to negotiate an escape route. He also stated that if the hijackers were not getting active support from the ISI, then India could have resolved the hijacking sooner.

On 27 December, a Taliban official speaking to a local newspaper stated that the hijackers should either leave Afghanistan or put down their weapons. Indian officials interpreted this statement as an understanding that Taliban officials would arrest the hijackers if they surrendered and began to negotiate with them concerning their demands. The hijackers initially demanded the release of Masood Azhar, who was lodged in an Indian prison and stated that they will release ten Indians, five foreigners and other passengers of their choice if the condition is met. India refused the offer and stated that until all the terms are laid down to completely end the hijacking, there would be no negotiations. On the same day, the hijackers made three demands which included the release of 36 prisoners lodged in various Indian jails, the return of the body of HuM founder Sajjad Afghani and US$200 million in cash. Afghani had been arrested earlier by the Indian authorities and was killed during a jailbreak earlier in 1999.

=== Prisoner release and end of the hijacking ===
On further negotiations, the demand was ultimately reduced to the release of three prisoners: Masood Azhar, Ahmed Omar Saeed Sheikh and Mushtaq Ahmed Zargar. Azhar was arrested for terrorist activities in Jammu and Kashmir in 1994. Sheikh had been arrested in connection with the 1994 kidnappings of foreigners perpetrated by HuA. Zargar, who had at least three dozen murder cases registered against him, had been arrested on 15 May 1992 and imprisoned in India. On 30 December, RAW chief A. S. Dulat communicated with then Chief Minister of Jammu and Kashmir Farooq Abdullah to release the prisoners who were then lodged in the state prisons. Abdullah was opposed to releasing the prisoners, warning Dulat of the long-term consequences, but eventually agreed to the demands of the Indian government. The three prisoners were released and flown to Kandahar.

By this time, the hostages had been allowed to de-plane by the hijackers, and the hijackers had also surrendered their weapons to the Taliban. Passenger accounts indicated the hijackers asked the passengers to show their gratitude to the Afghanistan government, following which money was collected and handed to one of the passengers, Anuj Sharma, who was instructed to use it to commission a memento of the hijacking for a museum in Kandahar. India explicitly conveyed to the Taliban that it expected the Taliban to arrest and act against the perpetrators. However, instead of arresting the hijackers and the three prisoners who had been handed over to them, the Taliban authorities gave them ten hours to leave the country and drove them to the Durand Line.

== Aftermath ==
After the incident, Indian Airlines suspended all flights to and from Kathmandu. The airline resumed its Kathmandu services after five months on 1 June 2000 under the same flight numbers, after Nepal assured India of full security at Kathmandu's airport. Nepal also agreed to the installation of an additional X-ray machine and a final screening of passengers by Indian security personnel at the airport. In January 2000, the security of Indian airports was handed over to the Central Industrial Security Force. The hijacked aircraft was returned to Indian Airlines and was scrapped in December 2003.

=== Investigation and trial ===
On 29 December, Indian intelligence intercepted a phone call from Pakistan that directed a Mumbai resident Abdul Latif Momin to contact a news agency in London and inform that the hijackers would blow the aircraft if their demands were not met.

The hijacking was investigated by the Indian Central Bureau of Investigation, which charged ten people including Latif, Dilip Kumar Bhujel, a Nepalese citizen known as Yusuf Nepali, and two Pakistan citizens Mohammed Iqbal and Mohammed Rehan. All were linked to the Harkat-ul-Mujahideen and the Pakistani intelligence agency Inter-Services Intelligence (ISI). Amongst the ten charged, the seven Pakistani citizens, five hijackers and Iqbal and Rehan, could not be arrested as they were in Pakistan. While the governments of Nepal and UAE helped with the subsequent investigation, the government of Pakistan refused to cooperate on the same. During the course of the investigation, arrest warrants for the Pakistani nationals, were forwarded to the Pakistani government by the CBI for their extradition to India. Though the CBI also sought the help of Interpol and got red corner notices issued against the seven, none of them were brought to trial.

The hijacked aircraft became the main piece of evidence involved in the subsequent criminal investigation and subsequently a model of the plane was created for the legal proceedings. After almost eight years of litigation, a Patiala House Court sentenced Latif, Bhujel, and Nepali to life imprisonment on 5 February 2008. The CBI later moved the Punjab and Haryana High Court demanding the death penalty for Latif. When the case came up for hearing in September 2012, the High Court dismissed the CBI's plea and confirmed the life imprisonment for Latif. It also acquitted the other two from conviction under the anti-hijacking law and confirmed their conviction only under the less stringent arms act. The CBI later approached the Supreme Court of India against the decision.

On 13 September 2012, the Jammu and Kashmir Police arrested Mehrajuddin Dand, who allegedly provided logistical support for the hijacking. Meanwhile, Latif's application for parole was rejected in 2015. On 10 July 2020, Latif along with 18 others including an employee of the passport office, was acquitted by a sessions court in Mumbai on charges relating to the fabrication of passports in connection with the hijacking incident. This did not affect his extant life sentence.

=== Domestic reaction ===
The relatives of the passengers aboard the flight raised public protests and tried to enter government briefings and meetings forcefully to get information on the status of the passengers and demanded that the government adhere to the requests of the hijackers to ensure the safe release of the passengers. In response, the government shared a message from the Kandahar ATC which stated that the plane was being regularly cleaned, and that the passengers were being provided with food, water and entertainment. However, this was later contradicted by the released passengers.

The incident was seen by the Indian media as a failure of the Indian government and intelligence. Media reports also criticised the government officials for not informing the Indian prime minister about the incident for more than an hour after the hijacking had begun. In a report to the Parliament of India on 1 March 2000, the external affairs minister Jaswant Singh stated that the government was not initially aware that the aircraft would land at Amritsar and there was limited information about the number of perpetrators and the nature of weapons. He further stated that any action would have contributed to undue risk as the information from the flight crew indicated that attackers had already killed passengers and the Indian authorities made all efforts to stop the aircraft from taking off from Amritsar. Singh received criticism from the media for praising the Taliban for their co-operation after the hostages had been returned.

According to a report in Firstpost, then RAW chief Dulat had revealed that Shashi Bhushan Singh Tomar, a RAW officer, was aboard the plane during the hijacking. It further opined that a proposal to send the NSG was apparently sabotaged by then secretary to the Indian prime minister N. K. Singh, whose sister was married to Tomar. According to former RAW officer R. K. Yadav, Tomar was alerted by a RAW operative in Kathmandu of plans by Pakistan-based terrorists to hijack an Indian plane. However, Tomar rebuked him and told him not to spread rumors. The report further stated that somehow Tomar ended up on the same plane which was hijacked and became the cause of failure of the operation.

=== International reaction ===
Al-Qaeda led by Osama bin Laden provided organisational support for the hijacking and the incident was a part of the millennium attack plots in late 1999 and early 2000 by Al-Qaeda linked terrorists. The Federal government of the United States released a press release condemning the hijacking incident and called for the release of hostages. Though the United States had started engaging against the Al-Qaeda after the bombings of American embassies in Africa in 1998, it actively engaged against the Taliban only after the September 11 attacks in 2001. In 2008, Jaswant Singh opined that the hijacking was a prelude to the 2001 attacks, and criticised that the United States spent millions in Pakistan in the name of fighting terrorism, but the country did not cooperate in taking action against the perpetrators.

UAE was one of the three countries that recognised the Taliban regime during the time. While it cooperated with the Indian authorities and helped with the release of hostages, it did not do much to prevent the plane from taking off from the country. The Pakistani government did not provide support in ending the hijack attempt and the Indian officials described the involvement of ISI in the hijacking. However, Minister for Foreign Affairs (Pakistan) Abdul Sattar accused India of staging the hijacking to defame the government of Pakistan.

=== Indian foreign policy ===
Doval, who was part of the negotiating team, described the whole incident as a diplomatic failure due to the government's inability to force the US and the UAE to help secure a quick release of the passengers. India had actively opposed the Taliban regime ever since it gained power in Afghanistan in 1996 as they were suspected to be involved in training militants for attacks in Kashmir region. Though Taliban had publicly indicated the displeasure at the hijacking, it did not actively help India and shared some similar interests with the ISI.

It was a set back to the Indian government as it was forced to directly negotiate with the Taliban, which it had not recognised previously. It later supported the Northern Alliance and provided logistical support to them in the fight against the Taliban. The leader of the alliance, Ahmad Shah Massoud, visited India on multiple occasions to discuss strategies to take on the Taliban. During the subsequent United States invasion of Afghanistan, the Indian government provided intelligence to the US on the locations of training camps of Islamic militants in Afghanistan.

=== Actions of released prisoners ===
The three released terrorists and the hijackers have since been implicated in other terrorist incidents such as the 2001 Indian Parliament attack, 2002 kidnapping and murder of American journalist Daniel Pearl, 2008 Mumbai attacks, 2016 Pathankot attack and the 2019 Pulwama attack. Azhar later founded Jaish-e-Mohammed in 2000, which gained notoriety for its alleged role in the various attacks that led to the death of hundreds of Indian civilians and armed forces personnel. Sheikh went on to join Azhar at JeM in 2000 after the release. He was later arrested in 2002 by Pakistani authorities for the abduction and murder of Daniel Pearl. He also played a significant role in planning the September 2001 attacks in the United States. Since his release, Zargar has played an active role in training Islamic militants in Pakistan administrated Kashmir.

=== Status of hijackers ===
Amjad Farooqi, who was earlier involved in the 1995 kidnapping of Western tourists in Kashmir by Al-Faran, was also involved in the hijacking under the alias Mansur Hasnain. On 1 March 2022, one of the hijackers, Zahoor Mistry, was killed by unidentified gunmen in a drive-by shooting in Karachi, Pakistan. He was responsible for the murder of Rupin Katyal during the hijacking. Indian media reported that Abdul Rauf Azhar, one of the accused and alleged mastermind behind the hijacking and Mohammad Yusuf Azhar, another named suspect in the hijacking, were allegedly killed in an airstrike by the Indian Air Force in Bahawalpur, Pakistan, as a part of 2025 India–Pakistan conflict on 7 May 2025. However, while international media sources acknowledged an attack on an Madrasa near Bahawalpur, there was no confirmation on whether Abdul Rauf and Yusuf Azhar were present during the strike, or their whereabouts after the attack, and Pakistani media reported that only civilians were killed in the attack.

== In popular culture ==
Captain Sharan was awarded the 1999 Safe Skies Award for "extraordinary coolness and courage in life-or-death circumstances".

=== Books ===
The incident has the subject of several books including various books co-authored by various members of the flight crew.

- Flight into Fear – A Captain's Story (2000) by Captain Devi Sharan and Srinjoy Chowdhury.
- IC 814 Hijacked! The Inside Story (2000) by Flight engineer Anil Jaggia and Saurabh Shukla.
- 173 Hours in Captivity (2000) by Neelesh Misra.
- IA's Terror Trail (2020) by flight purser Anil Sharma and intelligence official Ajit Doval.

=== Film and television ===
- Zameen (2003): A Hindi film loosely based upon the IC 814 hijacking and Operation Entebbe of the Israel Defense Forces.
- Combatting Terror (2007): The incident was part of the episode "Air Hijack" in the series featured on National Geographic Channel.
- Hijack (2008): A Hindi film by Kunal Shivdasani, starring Shiney Ahuja and Esha Deol based on the incident.
- Kandahar (2010): A Malayalam film by Major Ravi based on the hijack event.
- Payanam (2011): A Tamil film by Radha Mohan based on a similar incident involving an Indian Airlines flight.
- Yodha (2024): A Hindi film directed by Sagar Ambre and Pushkar Ojha references the incident.
- IC 814: The Kandahar Hijack (2024): A a six-episode Netflix miniseries by Anubhav Sinha based on the book by Captain Devi Sharan and Srinjoy Chowdhury.
- Dhurandhar (2025) and Dhurandhar: The Revenge (2026): Hindi films by Aditya Dhar partially based on the incident.

== See also ==
- List of hijackings of Indian aeroplanes
- 1971 Indian Airlines hijacking – Aviation incident
- Air France Flight 8969 – 1994 aircraft hijacking
- Air India Flight 182 – 1985 aircraft bombing over the Atlantic Ocean
- Lufthansa Flight 181 – 1977 aircraft hijacking

== Bibliography ==
- Macdonald, Myra (2017). Defeat Is an Orphan: How Pakistan Lost the Great South Asian War. Hurst & Co. ISBN 978-1-84904-858-3.
