= She (TV series) =

Indian crime drama web television series

- Promotional poster
- Created by: Imtiaz Ali
- Written by: Imtiaz Ali; Divya Johri
- Directed by: Arif Ali; Avinash Das
- Starring: Aaditi Pohankar; Vijay Varma; Kishore
- Theme music composer: Ishaan Chhabra
- Composer: Gaurang Soni
- Country of origin: India
- Original languages: Hindi and English
- No. of seasons: 2
- No. of episodes: 14

Production
- Production location: India
- Cinematography: Amit Roy
- Editor: Manish Jaitly
- Production companies: Window Seat Films; Inferno Pictures; Viacom18 Studios; Tipping Point

Original release
- Network: Netflix
- Release: 20 March 2020 – 17 June 2022

She is an Indian crime drama television series created and written by Imtiaz Ali and Divya Johry. Directed by Arif Ali and Avinash Das under production house Window Seat Films, the series stars Aaditi Pohankar, Vijay Varma and Kishore. It follows the story of a female constable who goes undercover to bust an underworld gang. She premiered on Netflix on 20 March 2020.

== Plot ==
She follows the journey of Bhumika Pardeshi, a quiet and underconfident constable from Mumbai who lives a difficult life burdened by financial struggles, a sick mother, and an unhappy marriage with her alcoholic husband. She feels invisible both at home and at work, treated as someone too timid to be taken seriously. But everything changes when she is unexpectedly chosen by the Anti-Narcotics Group to go undercover as a sex worker to help capture a dangerous drug cartel leader. Bhumi, who has never viewed herself as powerful, is pushed into a role that is completely opposite of her personality.

Her mission begins with trapping Sasya, a high-level drug dealer, who surprisingly becomes obsessed with Bhumi after she approaches him undercover. To everyone’s shock, Sasya refuses to speak to any officer except her, claiming she is the only one who can make him reveal the identity of the mysterious cartel boss known as Nayak. As Bhumi continues the undercover work, something inside her begins to shift. Acting as a seductive, confident woman begins awakening a side of herself she never knew existed. She discovers that her sexuality gives her unexpected control over dangerous men, and this realization becomes a source of power she starts to enjoy. However, the deeper she goes, the more she gets pulled into the cartel’s shadowy world, making her police team question whether she can be trusted.

By the end of Season 1, Bhumi finally comes close to the elusive Nayak, who watches her carefully and takes a strange interest in her. The season ends with Bhumi caught between two worlds—her duty as a constable and her growing attraction to the power and confidence she feels around Nayak. This sets the stage for Season 2, where her identity crisis intensifies. Now working more closely with Nayak, Bhumi finds herself drawn to him intellectually and emotionally. He manipulates her skillfully, making her feel seen, valued and powerful in a way no one else ever has. While she continues working with the police, she begins secretly taking decisions that benefit Nayak. Her loyalties blur, and her team starts to suspect she might have gone too far to return.

As Bhumi becomes deeply entangled with the cartel, she starts losing herself in this dangerous double life. Nayak’s psychological manipulation convinces her that she is capable of far greater power if she leaves her old identity behind. Meanwhile, the police demand that she fully betray Nayak, and Nayak asks her to betray the police—both sides pulling her in opposite directions. Bhumi realizes she cannot serve two masters, especially when she discovers that Nayak has been using her all along. His promises of partnership and power were only a tactic to control her.

In the final stretch of Season 2, Bhumi understands that neither the police nor Nayak truly care about her—both only want to use her abilities for their own agendas. This realization triggers her final transformation. Rejecting both sides, she chooses to take control of her own destiny. Bhumi kills Nayak, breaking free from his psychological hold. She then walks away from her old life entirely—her marriage, her weak identity, her police role, and even her former beliefs. The series ends with Bhumi reborn as a woman who has discovered her own strength, though in a morally grey and lonely way, having liberated herself from everyone who tried to define her.

== Cast ==
- Aaditi Pohankar as Bhumika Pardeshi
- Vijay Varma as Sasya
- Kishore as Nayak
- Vishwas Kini as ACP Jason Fernandez
- Saqib Ayub as Hemant
- Resh Lamba as Durga
- Vishesh Sagar as Kartik
- Sandeep Sridhar Dhabale
- Paritosh Sand as DCP Shishir
- Shivani Rangole as Rupa
- Ravish Desai as Amey
- Monika Dabade as Lawyer
- Suhita Thatte as Bhumika's Mother
- Sandeep Dhabale as Lokhande
- Dhruv Thukral as Deep
- Mohammad Ali Baig as ACP Alam
- Dilip Kumar Salvadi as Chinnana (Nayak's uncle)

== Episodes ==
=== Series overview ===
Series	Episodes	Originally released
1	7	20 March 2020
2	7	17 June 2022

=== Season 1 (2020) ===
No. overall	No. in season	Title	Directed by	Written by	Original release date
1	1	"The Pickup"	Arif Ali, Avinash Das	Imtiaz Ali	20 March 2020
Police officer Bhumi goes undercover as a prostitute to bust a drug cartel leader, but when the operation goes awry, she makes an unexpected discovery.
2	2	"The Proposal"	Arif Ali, Avinash Das	Imtiaz Ali, Manish Gaekwad	20 March 2020
A visit from Bhumi's estranged husband angers her rebellious sister. Sasya agrees to cooperate in a police interrogation - on one condition.
3	3	"The Pawn's Move"	Arif Ali, Avinash Das	Imtiaz Ali, Manish Gaekwad	20 March 2020
The team doubts Bhumi's mettle after Sasya manages to rattle her. Fernandez pushes to keep her as an undercover agent in a plan to nab Sasya's boss.
4	4	"Night Walk"	Arif Ali, Avinash Das	Imtiaz Ali, Manish Gaekwad	20 March 2020
After going to dangerous lengths to prove herself, Bhumi is recruited into Fernandez's department, and begins to prepare for her risky new role.
5	5	"It's Time"	Arif Ali, Avinash Das	Imtiaz Ali, Manish Gaekwad	20 March 2020
Newly emboldened, Bhumi seduces an unlikely target. Ahead of Nayak's arrival in Mumbai, Sasya attempts to gain police trust as an informant.
6	6	"The Promise"	Arif Ali, Avinash Das	Imtiaz Ali, Manish Gaekwad	20 March 2020
With Nayak now in Mumbai, Bhumi is moved to a hotel under police surveillance, but her first encounter with the kingpin takes the team by surprise.
7	7	"Devil's Share"	Arif Ali, Avinash Das	Imtiaz Ali, Manish Gaekwad	20 March 2020
In the wake of an unexpected complication, Fernandez doubts Sasya's loyalty. Caught off guard by a suspicious Nayak, Bhumi drops her own bombshell.

=== Season 2 (2022) ===
No. overall	No. in season	Title	Directed by	Written by	Original release date
8	1	"The Test"	Unknown	Unknown	17 June 2022
9	2	"The Tightrope"	Unknown	Unknown	17 June 2022
10	3	"The Devil's Double"	Unknown	Unknown	17 June 2022
11	4	"Samsara"	Unknown	Unknown	17 June 2022
12	5	"Karma Cola"	Unknown	Unknown	17 June 2022
13	6	"Dark Seduction"	Unknown	Unknown	17 June 2022
14	7	"The Switch"	Unknown	Unknown	17 June 2022

== Controversy ==
In Season 2 Episode 1, the series portrays a character by the name of Ismail as the owner of a prostitution cartel dressed in the traditional attire specific to the Dawoodi Bohra community which sparked a controversy.

== Critical reception ==
Swetha Ramakrishnan from Firstpost gave credit to the cinematography of the series and applauded the cast performances. However, she further mentioned how and why she was disappointed with Imtiaz Ali on the plot. Hindustan Times termed the series as sleazy and sloppy but hailed few instances from the series.

Scroll.in appreciated the performance of Vijay Verma and highlighted that his character who was used to set up the events in the series was eventually sidelined at the end, which was disheartening.
