= Devi Sharan =

Indian airline pilot

- Born: 1962 (age 63–64); Haryana
- Education: Dyal Singh College, Delhi, India
- Known for: Indian Airlines Flight 814; IC 814: The Kandahar Hijack
- Aviation career
- Famous flights: Indian Airlines Flight 814

Devi Sharan (born 1962) is an Indian retired aircraft pilot who was the captain of Indian Airlines Flight 814 when it was hijacked by the Harkat-ul-Mujahideen in December 1999.

In 2024, Netflix released IC 814: The Kandahar Hijack, a drama series adapted from Sharan's biography, Flight Into Fear.

== Early life ==
Devi Sharan was born in 1962 in the village of Sawant, near Karnal in Haryana. He graduated from Dyal Singh College, Delhi, and joined Indian Airlines in 1986. Early in his flying career he flew the Boeing 737-200. By the late 1990s, he was flying Airbus aircraft.

=== Indian Airlines Flight 814 ===
Sharan was the captain of Indian Airlines Flight 814 when it was hijacked by the Harkat-ul-Mujahideen in December 1999.

== Later life ==
In 2011 during the Libyan civil war and Operation Safe Homecoming he operated an Airbus to Libya.

In 2024, Netflix released IC 814: The Kandahar Hijack, a drama series adapted from Sharan's autobiography Flight Into Fear, based on the 1999 hijacking incident, with actor Vijay Varma portraying Sharan.

Sharan retired in 2025, taking his last flight on 4 January, when he flew a Boeing 787 Dreamliner from Melbourne to Delhi.
