= Har Shaakh Pe Ullu Baithaa Hai =

- Genre: Sitcom
- Created by: Ashwni Dhir
- Written by: Ashwni Dhir
- Directed by: Ashwni Dhir; K. Paulraj
- Starring: Rajeev Nigam; Samta Sagar
- Country of origin: India
- Original language: Hindi
- No. of episodes: 140

Production
- Producer: Ashwni Dhir
- Production location: Mumbai
- Running time: 22 min. approx.
- Production companies: Garima Productions; Radaan Mediaworks

Original release
- Network: StarPlus
- Release: 26 February – 7 September 2018

Har Shaakh Pe Ullu Baithaa Hai (transl. There's An Owl Sitting On Every Branch) is an Indian sitcom television series, that premiered on 26 February 2018 on StarPlus. The Show stars Rajeev Nigam and Samta Sagar in Lead Roles. The Show is produced by Garima Productions.

== Plot ==
The series is set in the fictional state of Ulta Pradesh. The story centres on Chaitu Lal, the Chief Minister of the state and leader of the Thenga Party. Chaitu is portrayed as a shrewd and opportunistic politician who makes promises to the public while primarily serving his own interests. His wife, Imli Devi, supports him both politically and personally. She remains loyal to him and hopes that her brother, Putan, will eventually become the Prime Minister of the country. Putan is depicted as a young and ambitious politician who, like his brother-in-law, is involved in controversial activities, including multiple legal cases and questions over the authenticity of his educational qualifications. The narrative follows the political manoeuvres, personal relationships, and power dynamics within this family as they navigate the world of politics in Ulta Pradesh.

== Cast ==
=== Main ===
- Rajeev Nigam as Chaitu Lal - The Chief Minister of Ulta Pradesh (Fictional State)
- Samta Sagar as Imli Devi - Chaitu Lal's Wife
- Ishtiyak Khan as Puttan - Chaitu Lal's Brother-in-law

=== Recurring ===
- Melissa Pais as Malai Devi - Chaitu Lal's Sister-in-law
- Shraddha Sharma as Genda Devi - Leader of Opposition Party
- Dishank Arora as Genda Devi's Paternal Aunt's Husband
- Poornima Verma as Rajneeti
- Alika Nair as Party
- Sonam Shekhawat as Ghotali
- Riya Raval as Sarkar
- Naitik Chudasama as Bahumat
- Kinjal Mehta as Haseena Devi
- Lalita Sen as Monica - Chaitu's First Personal Assistant
- Babita Anand as Chaaya - Chaitu's Second Personal Assistant
- Gazala Selmin as Parvati
- Abhishek Agarwal as Bundi
