= Nidhi Razdan =

Indian journalist (born 1977)

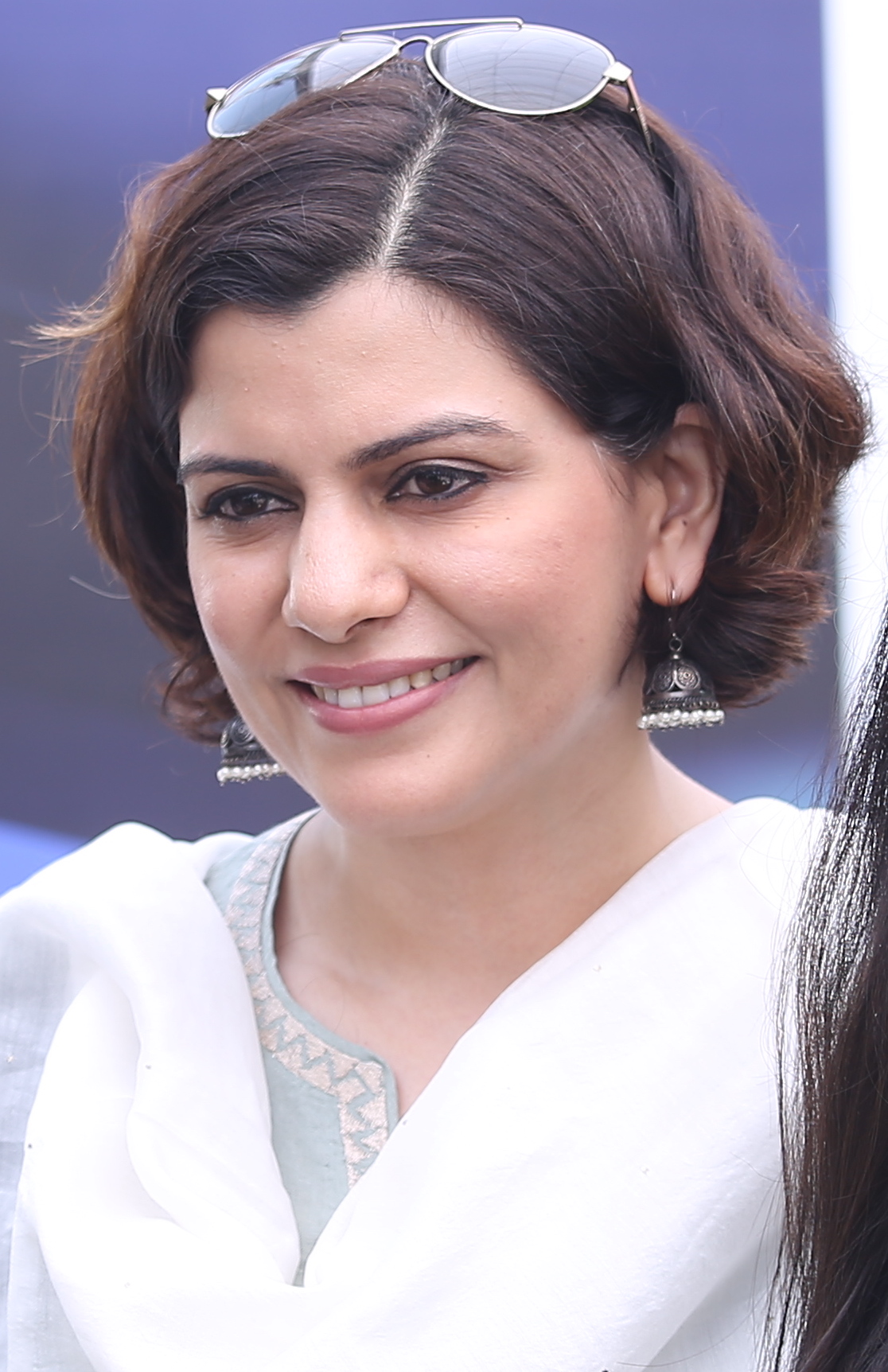
- Razdan in March 2016
- Born: 11 April 1977 (age 49); Budgam, Jammu and Kashmir, India
- Education: Lady Shri Ram College; Indian Institute of Mass Communication
- Occupation: Journalist
- Years active: 1999–present
- Spouse: Neelesh Misra (m. 2005; div. 2007) Omar Abdullah (m. 2026)

Nidhi Razdan (born 11 April 1977) is an Indian journalist and television personality. She was the executive editor of NDTV and the primary anchor of NDTV 24x7 news debate show Left, Right & Centre, and the weekly debate show The Big Fight.

Since 1999, Razdan has covered a variety of news events and hosted a series of shows, often reporting live from the news scene. She has reported extensively on a wide range of political, economic, and social stories from the Indian subcontinent, covering the Indian politics and foreign affairs closely, including the India-US nuclear deal, general elections, several state elections, major news developments and elections in Jammu and Kashmir, the earthquakes in Gujarat in 2001 and Kashmir in 2005. Razdan has been the diplomatic correspondent of NDTV 24x7, which is an English language television channel that carries news and current affairs in India, owned by New Delhi Television Ltd network.

She has done documentaries from Pakistan-administered Kashmir, Tibet and the United Kingdom after the July 2005 London train bombings. Razdan has also authored a book titled Left, Right and Centre: The Idea of India, which was published in July 2017 by Penguin Random House India.

She said that in June 2020 she was approached by some people for the job of "associate professor" at a "journalism school" at Harvard University . In January 2021, Razdan tweeted that she was a victim of an elaborate phishing attack that had made her quit her 21-year-old job and part with many of her personal details.

== Personal life ==
Nidhi Razdan is a Kashmiri Pandit and the daughter of Maharaj Krishan Razdan, the former editor-in-chief of news agency, Press Trust of India. She studied at Apeejay School, Sheikh Sarai, New Delhi. She graduated from Lady Shri Ram College and later pursued a Post-Graduate Diploma in Radio and TV Journalism at the Indian Institute of Mass Communication, Delhi (1998–99). She is from Budgam (Central Kashmir), Jammu & Kashmir.

Razdan married journalist and writer, Neelesh Misra, in 2005. The couple divorced two years later in 2007.

In October 2026, Razdan married Omar Abdullah, the Chief Minister of Jammu and Kashmir.

== Career ==
Razdan joined NDTV in 1999 and worked till June 2020 for twenty one years. She was the executive editor of NDTV and the primary anchor of NDTV 24x7 news show Left, Right & Centre. The program is normally broadcast live from a New Delhi studio every evening and covers debates and discussions on and beyond breaking news stories and headlines. She also anchored the weekly show, The Big Fight, which pits those on opposite sides of an issue against each other in a debate.

Since the start of her career in 1999, Razdan has covered a variety of news events and hosted a series of shows, often reporting live from the news scene. She has reported extensively on a wide range of key political, economic, and social stories from the Indian subcontinent, covering the Indian politics and foreign affairs closely, including the India-US nuclear deal, general elections, several state elections, all major news developments and elections in Jammu and Kashmir, the earthquakes in Gujarat in 2001 and Kashmir in 2005. Razdan has been the diplomatic correspondent of NDTV 24x7, which is an English language television channel that carries news and current affairs in India, owned by New Delhi Television Ltd network.

She has done documentaries from Pakistan-administered Kashmir, Tibet and the United Kingdom after the train bombings. Razdan has also authored a book titled Left, Right and Centre: The Idea of India, which was published in July 2017 by Penguin Random House India.

She had anchored the following shows on NDTV:

- NDTV 24x7, prime time news
- Left, Right & Centre, variety talk show
- India Decides @ 9
- The Lead
- The Big Fight

In June 2020, she quit NDTV saying she had a job offer of an associate professor in journalism at Harvard University. On 15 January 2021, she announced on Twitter that she had been the victim of a "sophisticated phishing attack", which was exposed when she contacted Harvard. She also announced that she will be pursuing legal action against the perpetrators. She returned to NDTV in February 2022 to anchor the primetime show ‘No Spin’. On Tuesday, 31 January 2023 she announced on Twitter that she has resigned from NDTV. As of May 2021, Razdan was a director of strategic programs at Gandhi Institute of Technology and Management and was also a visiting member of the faculty at Kautilya School of Public Policy.

== Awards ==
- Teacher's Achievement Award (TAA) for Communication (Electronic Journalism), 2011.
- Ramnath Goenka Award for Excellence in Journalism for reporting from Jammu and Kashmir and north-eastern India.
- The Jammu and Kashmir State government award for excellence in journalism.
- News Show Host of the Year 2010 – English at the Indian News Broadcasting Awards.
- Best Anchor at Exchange4media Awards, 2011.
- International Press Institute award for excellence in journalism for Kathua rape and murder case expose.

== List of works ==
- Left, Right and Centre: The Idea of India (2017) ISBN 9780670089703
