= Gemini Ganeshanum Suruli Raajanum =

2017 Indian Tamil-language film by Odam Ilavarasu

- Theatrical Release Poster
- Directed by: Odam Ilavarasu
- Written by: Odam Ilavarasu
- Produced by: T. Siva
- Starring: Atharvaa; Soori; Aishwarya Rajesh; Regina Cassandra; Pranitha Subhash; Aaditi Pohankar
- Cinematography: Sree Saravanan
- Edited by: Praveen K. L.
- Music by: D. Imman
- Production company: Amma Creations
- Release date: July 14, 2017
- Running time: 145 minutes
- Country: India
- Language: Tamil

Gemini Ganeshanum Suruli Raajanum (transl. Gemini Ganesan and Suruli Rajan) is a 2017 Indian Tamil-language romantic comedy film, written and directed by Odam Ilavarasu and produced by T. Siva. The film stars Atharvaa, Soori, Aishwarya Rajesh, Regina Cassandra, Pranitha Subhash and Aaditi Pohankar. The film narrates the story of a college-time casanova heading back to deliver wedding invitations to his ex-girlfriends. The music was composed by D. Imman with cinematography by Sree Saravanan and editing by Praveen K. L. The film was released on 14 July 2017.

== Plot ==
Gemini Ganeshan, a playboy, falls in love with four different women and promises to marry them. Years later, his fiancee Pooja asks him to apologize to his ex-girlfriends and invite them to their wedding.

== Cast ==
- Atharvaa as Gemini Ganeshan
- Soori as Suruli Rajan
- Aishwarya Rajesh as Pooja
- Regina Cassandra as Lavanya
- Pranitha Subhash as Priya
- Aaditi Pohankar as Saroja Devi
- Rajendran as Sultan Kattappa
- Mayilsamy as Udhagai Ulaganatha
- T. Siva as Beniqui, Gemini's father
- Sonia as Gemini's mother
- Tamilselvi as Saroja Devi’s mother
- Sai Dheena as Ooty Rowdy
- Neha Malik as Megha
- Aishwarya Palani as Karthika

== Production ==
During October 2015, T. Siva agreed to finance Odam Ilavarasu's directorial debut with Kalaiyarasan and Soori signed on to play the lead roles. Titled Gemini Ganeshanum Suruli Raajanum, the film was reported to be a crime thriller and comedy with four lead actresses. However, the shoot of the film was indefinitely delayed from December 2015 and the project was later shelved.

The story seems to follow a similar storyline like the Hindi movie Bachna Ae Haseeno (2008). In a turn of events during June 2016, the film was launched with Atharvaa in the lead role, while Regina Cassandra was thereafter signed on as one of the lead actresses. The film began shooting during late June 2016 in Madurai. The third schedule of the film began in Ooty during September 2016, with actresses Pranitha, Aishwarya Rajesh and Anandhi also joining the film's cast. The director had initially cast Aishwarya in the role later assigned to Pranitha, but changed his mind. The team then returned to Chennai to film a fourth and final schedule, with the makers announcing that the film would be released during December 2016. Anandhi left the project in October 2016, citing that she did not feel her role was meaningful in comparison to the other actresses, and was subsequently replaced by Hindi actress Aaditi Pohankar.

== Soundtrack ==
Gemini Ganeshanum Suruli Raajanum

Soundtrack album by D. Imman
- Released: 2017
- Recorded: 23 June 2017
- Length: 22:17
- Language: Tamil
- Label: Sony Music India
- Producer: D. Imman

D. Imman chronology
Adhagappattathu Magajanangalay (2017)	Gemini Ganeshanum Suruli Raajanum (2017)	Rubaai (2017)

The film's music was composed by D. Imman in his first collaboration with Atharvaa. The album was released on 23 June 2017.

All lyrics are written by Yugabharathi.

Track list
No.	Title	Singer(s)	Length
1.	"Ammukuttiye"	Pradeep Kumar	4:20
2.	"Kanmani"	Abhay Jodhpurkar	4:45
3.	"Vennila Thangachi"	Nakash Aziz, Ramya NSK	4:18
4.	"Aahaa Aahaa"	Haricharan, Shreya Ghoshal	4:15
5.	"Thambi Cuttingu"	Anthony Daasan, Vijay Yesudas	4:39
Total length:			22:17

== Release ==
The film was released on 14 July 2017 alongside three other notable Tamil releases in Pandigai, Rubaai and Thiri. It opened to mixed reviews, with a critic from The Hindu stating it was "a rom-com that fails to bring in the chuckles". Likewise, The Indian express wrote "this film will surely come under the category of it being so bad that it's good" and that "the leading ladies in the film are not even arm candy as within minutes we see a new face as the film moves forward", concluding "this film is simply, a spoof of spoofs". Likewise, Sify.com called the film a "tedious watch" adding "the film is basically a regressive anti-women modern day version of Cheran's classic Autograph (2004)".

In contrast, a critic from the New Indian Express wrote "a hilarious turnaround saves this not so innocent comedy", adding "you’ve got to think of the film as the lighthearted neighbor of Manmadhan (2004), and the distant, more innocent cousin of Trisha Illana Nayanthara (2015)". Likewise, a reviewer from the Deccan Chronicle wrote the film was a "lighthearted treat filled with witty one-liners", and that "it’s fun to watch it once, but could have used a firmer screenplay". The director, Odam Ilavarasu, has also stated his intentions of creating a sequel to the film, with the addition of actress Neha Malik.
