= Anaarkali of Aarah =

2017 Indian film by Avinash Das

- Hindi: अनारकली ऑफ आरा
- Directed by: Avinash Das
- Written by: Avinash Das
- Produced by: Priya Kapur; Sandiip Kapur
- Starring: Swara Bhaskar; Sanjay Mishra; Pankaj Tripathi
- Cinematography: Arvind Kannabiran
- Edited by: Jabeen Merchant
- Music by: Rohit Sharma
- Production company: Promodome Motion Pictures
- Distributed by: PVR Cinemas
- Release date: 24 March 2017
- Running time: 113 minutes
- Country: India
- Language: Hindi
- Budget: ₹5.75 crore
- Box office: ₹1.48 crore

Anaarkali of Aarah (Anārakalī ŏph Ārā) is a 2017 Indian film written and directed by debutant Avinash Das. The movie has Swara Bhaskar playing the lead role of a small-town erotic folk dancer in Arrah in Bihar. The movie revolves around her confrontation with a vice chancellor played by Sanjay Mishra. The film was released on 24 March 2017. Bhaskar received widespread acclaim for her performance and a Filmfare Award nomination for Best Actress (critics) at the 63rd Filmfare Awards.

== Plot ==
Anaarkali of Aarah is the story of Anaarkali (Swara Bhaskar), who makes a living by performing erotic songs at functions. During one of her stage shows, Anaarkali comes across Dharmender Chauhan (Sanjay Mishra), the vice chancellor of a local university, who tries to molest her. This leads to a conflict between the two, where Dharmender is in a position of power, but Anaarkali refuses to give in to the challenges and instead decides to fight back.

== Cast ==
- Swara Bhaskar as Anarkali
- Sanjay Mishra as Vice Chancellor Dharmender Chauhan
- Pankaj Tripathi as Rangeela
- Ishtiyak Khan as Hiraman Tiwari
- Vijay Kumar as Inspector Bulbul Pandey
- Ipsita Chakraborty Singh as Chamki Rani
- Man Mohan Joshi as Faiyaz Bhai (Anarkali's Chaachaa)
- Abhishek Sharma as Sukhilal Sipahi
- Vishwas Bhanu as Dukhilal Sipahi
- Mayur More as Anwar
- Nitin Arora as Studio Owner

== Production ==
=== Development ===
According to Avinash Das, the director of Anaarkali of Aarah, the idea to make this film originated after he watched a music video of Bhojpuri folk artist Tarabano Faizabadi in which she was singing an erotic song Hare Hare Nebuaa. He says, "It intrigued me that visuals of Tarabano singing expressionless in a studio were mixed with a sequence in which a woman is trying to seduce a man. In 2011, a Bhojpuri folk singer, Devi, stood up against the Vice Chancellor of Jai Prakash Narayan University for molesting her at an event. These two incidents helped Avinash in the creation of Anaarkali, the central character of his film. Avinash says, "These two threads began to form into a script about a street singer who sings erotically-charged songs but has the integrity to challenge the powers when she is mistreated."

=== Casting ===
Initially, the central role of Anaarkali was supposed to be played by Richa Chadda but she opted out of the project, the reason for it being, as stated by Director Avinash, that she was unsure of the film getting a release considering it was smaller budget film as compared to the projects that she was doing at that time.

== Soundtrack ==
Anaarkali of Aarah

Soundtrack album by Rohit Sharma
- Released: 27 February 2017
- Genre: Feature film soundtrack
- Length: 38:58
- Label: Zee Music Company
External audio
- Audio Jukebox on YouTube

The soundtrack of Anaarkali of Aaarah comprises 10 songs, all of them composed by Rohit Sharma while the lyrics have been written by Ramkumar Singh, Dr. Sagar, Ravinder Randhawa, Prashant Ingole and Avinash Das.

Tracklist
No.	Title	Lyrics	Singer(s)	Length
1.	"Dunaliya Mein Jung"	Ramkumar Singh	Swati Sharma	5:15
2.	"Lahanga Jhaanke"	Ravinder Randhawa	Indu Sonali	2:49
3.	"Aye Sakhi Ooh"	Ramkumar Singh	Pawni Pandey	3:57
4.	"Badnaam Jiya De Gaari"	Ravinder Randhawa	Rekha Bhardwaj	6:20
5.	"Mann Beqaid Huva"	Prashant Ingole	Sonu Nigam	4:18
6.	"Mora Piya Matlab Ka Yaar"	Dr. Sagar	Swati Sharma	3:41
7.	"Sa Ra Ra Ra"	Ravinder Randhawa	Pawni Pandey	7:32
8.	"Mera Balam Bambaiya"	Avinash Das	Pawni Pandey	2:33
9.	"Hamre Jobna Pe"	Avinash Das	Indu Sonali	1:27
10.	"Laal Laal Cheekwa"	Ravinder Randhawa	Rohit Sharma	1:06
Total length:				38:58

== Reception ==
=== Critical response ===
On the review aggregator website Rotten Tomatoes, Anaarkali of Aarah has an approval rating of 100% based on 7 reviews, with an average score of 7/10.

Renuka Vyavahare of The Times of India gave the film a rating of 3.5 out of 5 and said that "Anaarkali of Aarah is an unexpected winner that stuns you with its authenticity." The critic praised the director Avinash Das by saying that, "Avinash Das’ execution lends gravitas to the proceedings, making you feel for the lead character" and also the lead actress Swara Bhaskar by saying that, "this film finally gives Swara Bhaskar an opportunity to put her exemplary acting chops on display. She is a revelation as a pan-chewing, courageous woman, who won’t buckle under pressure." Rohit Vats of Hindustan Times gave the film a rating of 3 out of 5 and said that, "Anaarkali of Aarah brings forth a world that’s out of focus and needs our attention. Marginalised sections are fighting their own battles in this part of the globe and Anaarkali Of Aarah wants us to be sympathetic to them." Savera R Someshwar of Rediff gave the film a rating of 4 out of 5 saying that, "Anaarkali Of Aarah is a tale well told".

Shubhra Gupta of The Indian Express gave the film a rating of 3.5 out of 5 and said that, "With Anar, Swara Bhaskar gets a role worthy of her. The film uses lines and situations involving crudity but never turns vulgar. Nowhere does Anaarkali of Aarah makes you cringe, and that’s a real achievement." Namrata Joshi of The Hindu praised the performances of Swara Bhaskar, Pankaj Tripathi, Sanjay Mishra and Ishtiyaq Khan and said that the film is, "A unique, well observed, raunchy musical that reiterates that no means no." Shomini Sen of News18 gave the film a rating of 4 out of 5 and said that, "the film works for its tight script- which never dwindles- and for its powerful story. That a marginalized section also has the right to speak up against any kind of atrocity is something that the film highlights well. Rachit Gupta of Filmfare gave the film a rating of 3.5 out of 5 and said that, "Keeping in line with Hindi cinema's new found passion for strong women protagonists and their resilient stories, Anarkali Of Aarah is the pitch perfect lesson in relevant feminism. This one's a must watch, whether you live in a metro or in rural India."

Mayank Shekhar of Mid-Day gave the film a rating of 3.5 out of 5 and applauded Swara Bhaskar's performance by saying that, "It's hard to come across a performance so gut-wrenchingly real. It's hard to tell Swara from Anaarkali of Arrah, who's thankfully not another 'abla nari' either." Nandini Ramnath of Scroll.in said that, "Swara Bhaskar is superb as a singer out to prove that ‘no means no’. Avinash Das's debut feature overcomes its indulgences and flaws by focusing on the big picture on sexual assault and consent." Stutee Ghosh of The Quint gave the film a rating of 3 out of 5 saying that "The idea is fantastic, which makes it an important film that has its heart in the right place, but the execution leaves it wobbly in parts." Tanul Thakur of The Wire said, "The film seethes with anger about gender disparity, but it makes its points without sacrificing the film’s plot or resorting to preachy overlong platitudes." He also applauded Swara Bhaskar saying that, "Bhaskar plays Anaarkali with so much verve, joy, and anger that it’s impossible to not feel intrigued by her and, ultimately, the film."

=== Box office ===
Made on a budget of ₹5.75 crore (US$600,000), it has grossed over ₹1.48 crore (US$150,000) worldwide, emerging as a commercial failure.

== Awards and nominations ==
Date of ceremony	Award	Category	Recipient(s) and nominee(s)	Result	Ref.
20 January 2018	Filmfare Awards	Best Actress (Critics)	Swara Bhaskar	Nominated	
20 March 2018	News18 Reel Movie Awards	Best Actress	Swara Bhaskar	Nominated	
20 March 2018	News18 Reel Movie Awards	Best Art / Production Design	Mainak Das	Nominated	

== Controversy ==
The film courted controversy when its trailer depicted an item number performed as part of the silver jubilee functions of the Veer Kunwar Singh University in Arrah.
