= 173 Hours in Captivity =

2000 book by Neelesh Misra

- Book cover, first edition as book
- Author: Neelesh Misra
- Language: English
- Publisher: HarperCollins
- Publication date: 1 June 2000
- ISBN: 978-8172233945

173 Hours In Captivity: The Hijacking of IC 814 is a 2000 book (ISBN 81-7223-394-9) written by Neelesh Misra, a New Delhi-based correspondent of the Associated Press. The book is about the hijacking of Indian Airlines Flight 814 on its journey from Kathmandu to New Delhi on Christmas Eve, 24 December 1999.

== Introduction ==
The sequence of events outside the plane (IC 814) is a well-documented and familiar story. The book presents the events inside the plane. During their 173 hours of captivity, the passengers and the crew lived and re-lived, experienced and re-experienced many uncomfortable emotions. The book recaptures the sequences which happened inside the Airbus A300.

== Inside the Airbus A300 ==
Some of the incidents aboard the Airbus that are detailed in the book include:

- The behavior of the five masked men, nicknamed Chief, Burger, Doctor, Shankar and Bhola, towards the passengers and the crew.
- The plight of Rachana Katyal, newlywed bride of Rupin Katyal, whose husband was slashed by one of the hijackers, and bled slowly and painfully to death.
- The conditions inside the plane, with terrified passengers wetting their clothes on their seats; their "silent cries", fainting and vomiting.

== Blackmail ==
This blackmail by the gang of five paid off and the passengers and the crew were flown back from Kandahar, Afghanistan to New Delhi - the price of their freedom being setting free few terrorists who were held under the custody of the Government of India.

== Aftermath ==
The book hints that India was left alone following the hijacking of IC 814 because they negotiated with the terrorists, thus appeasing them.

== See also ==
- Indian Airlines Flight 814
