= Aaditi Pohankar =

Indian actress

- Pohankar in 2025
- Occupation: Actress
- Years active: 2010–present
- Notable work: She, Aashram

Aaditi Pohankar is an Indian actress who appears in Hindi, Marathi and Tamil films and web series. She had her breakthrough role alongside Riteish Deshmukh in the Marathi action film Lai Bhaari (2014). She gained wider attention for her roles in the Hindi web series She and Aashram (both 2020–present).

== Early life ==
Aaditi Pohankar was born to Sudhir and Shobha Pohankar, both athletes. While in school, she represented Maharashtra in athletics and won medals in 100 metres and 200 metres races.

== Career ==
Pohankar began her career in theatre and had her first minor film role in the Hindi anthology film Love Sex Aur Dhokha (2010) and her first major film role in the Marathi film Kunasathi Kunitari (2011). She was spotted by director Nishikant Kamat when he saw Makarand's play Time Boy in Mumbai, where the actress starred as a seven-year-old boy. Kamat made her go through two days of screen tests for a role in his Marathi film Lai Bhaari (2014) and cast her opposite Riteish Deshmukh after being impressed with her temperament. Pohankar revealed that during the shoot, Kamat gave her the liberty to do what she wanted as an actress and to get into her character, she visualized herself as "an evil person". Lai Bhaari opened to positive reviews, with Pohankar's villainous character receiving praise. The film went on to become one of the highest-grossing Marathi films.

In 2017, Pohankar starred alongside Atharvaa in the Tamil film Gemini Ganeshanum Suruli Raajanum.

Three years later, Pohankar starred in the Netflix web series She (2020), playing a police constable used as a honeytrap. Nandini Ramnath of Scroll.in found Pohankar to be "riveting" in the role, adding that she successfully "unlocks her character's complexity".

Later in 2020, she starred in Aashram, playing the role of a young wrestler who is attracted to the seemingly democratic setup of the ashram, upon learning that her being a Dalit is keeping her from success due to casteism. She gained wider attention for her roles in the Hindi web series She and Aashram (both 2020–present). For this role, she was trained by wrestler Sangram Singh. A reviewer for IANS opined, "Aaditi Pohankar's zestful Pammi stands out for the way the actress traces the character arc."

== In the media ==
Pohankar has appeared in over twenty brand ads and commercials including for Cadbury Munch, Godrej AER, Airtel, Lenskart and Samsung, in which she was directed by Shoojit Sircar.

Pohankar was ranked in The Times Most Desirable Women at No. 47 in 2020.

== Filmography ==
=== Films ===
| Year | Film | Role | Language | Notes |
|---|---|---|---|---|
| 2010 | Love Sex Aur Dhokha | Aditi | Hindi | credited as Aditi Singh Pohankar |
| 2011 | Kunasathi Kunitari | Neha Shinde | Marathi | |
| 2014 | Lai Bhaari | Nandini | Marathi | |
| 2017 | Typecaste | Nalini | Hindi | |
| 2017 | Gemini Ganeshanum Suruli Raajanum | Saroja Devi | Tamil | |
| 2018 | Truckbhar Swapna | Kajal | Marathi | |
| 2024 | Star | Surabi Kalaiarasan | Tamil | |

=== Television ===
| Year | Title | Role | Language | Notes |
|---|---|---|---|---|
| 2020–2022 | She | Bhumika "Bhumi" Pardeshi | Hindi | Netflix series |
| 2020–present | Aashram | Parminder "Pammi" Lochan | Hindi | MX Player series |
| 2025–present | Mandala Murders | Moksha | Hindi | Netflix series |
| 2025 | Ziddi Ishq | Mehul Bose | Hindi | JioHotstar series |
