= Shraddha Sharma =

Indian singer (born 1995)

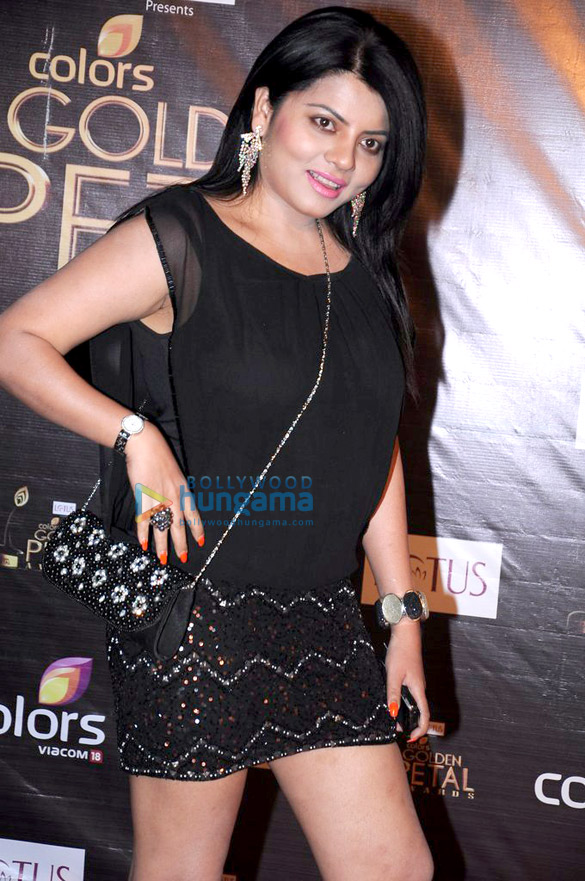
- Colors Golden Petal Awards 2012
- Born: 15 October 1995 (age 30); Dehradun, Uttarakhand, India
- Occupations: Singer, guitarist, actress
- Years active: 2011–present
- Known for: Har Shaakh Pe Ullu Baithaa Hai

Shraddha Sharma is an Indian singer from Dehradun, Uttarakhand who started out by uploading videos to YouTube. The first video was a cover of the song "Main Tenu Samjhawan ki" from the movie Virsa, uploaded when Sharma was 15, on 30 April 2011.

Sharma signed an album deal with Universal and a YouTube deal with Culture Machine.

Her album was launched at the inaugural YouTube Fan Fest on 1 March 2014 in Mumbai. Titled Raastey, the album is an eclectic mix of pop, R&B, rock and dance.

After Sharma released her video "Dum Maro Dum", she planned to begin composing her next single.

== Songs ==
| Album | Song | Lyrics | Ref. |
|---|---|---|---|
| Raastey (2014) | "Raastey" | Ankur Tewari | |
| Raastey (2014) | "Jump" | Ankur Tewari | |
| Raastey (2014) | "Main Aur Tu" | Ankur Tewari | |
| Raastey (2014) | "Yeh Vaada Raha" | Ankur Tewari | |
| Raastey (2014) | "Sapne" | Ankur Tewari | |
| Raastey (2014) | "Jaane Do Naa" | Ankur Tewari | |
| Raastey (2014) | "Saara Jahaan" | Ankur Tewari | |
| Raastey (2014) | "Zalim" | Ankur Tewari | |
