= Pooja Singhal =

Indian civil servant (born 1978)

Pooja Singhal (born 7 July 1978) is an Indian former civil servant. She served as Mining Secretary of Jharkhand until being separated from her duties in May 2022, following an arrest for money laundering. In January 2025, she was bailed and her suspension was revoked.

== Early life and career ==
Singhal was born on 7 July 1978, in Dehradun. She joined the Indian Administrative Service at age 21, making her among the country's youngest civil officers. In 2004, she was posted to a position in the Jharkhand state department of health and family welfare, where she was in charge of the Rajendra Institute of Medical Sciences; after several postings in local areas, she became an event coordinator for the state government in 2014 before working in the agriculture department and then being named secretary of the mines and industries departments in 2021.

== Money laundering case ==
In May 2022, Singhal was arrested and was produced before the court of Shri Prabhat Kumar Sharma, the designated court to hear money laundering cases in Ranchi. The mining secretary was arrested in connection to money laundering linked to alleged embezzlement of MGNREGA funds. The federal agency had conducted raids throughout different locations across four states regarding the case and recovered ₹174,900,000 from a chartered accountant associated with Singhal and her husband. The Jharkhand state government suspended her from her duties as mining secretary. On 25 May, Singhal was sent to judicial custody for two weeks, a day after Enforcement Directorate officials raided six locations in Ranchi and one in Muzaffarpur in Bihar in connection with the inquiry.

After three months of interim bail granted for treatment of her ill daughter, Singhal surrendered to authorities on 10 April 2023, and charges were framed against her in Sharma's court under sections 3 and 4 of the Prevention of Money Laundering Act, 2002.

== Personal life ==
Singhal's first husband was fellow IAS officer Rahul Parwar; they divorced. Sue later married a businessman, Abhishek Jha, with whom she has a daughter, Ayushi Purwar.
