= Ishtiyak Khan =

Indian actor (born 1976)

Istayak Arif Khan
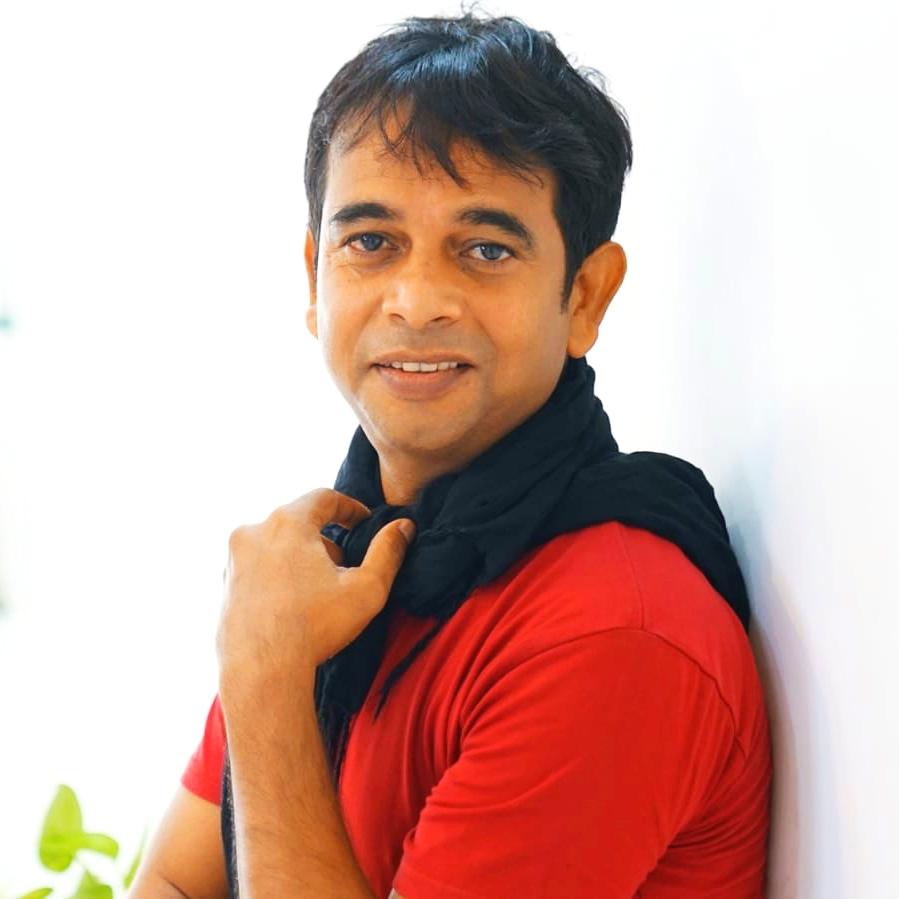
- Khan in 2022
- Born: Istayak Arif Khan; 15 April 1976 (age 50); Panna, Madhya Pradesh, India
- Citizenship: Mumbai
- Education: National School of Drama
- Occupation: Actor
- Years active: 1989-present
- Known for: Anaarkali of Aarah, Bharat, Jolly LLB and FryDay
- Spouse: Kiran Arif Khan (m. 2007)
- Children: Sheen Khan (daughter), Shams Khan (son)
- Parent(s): Furkan Ali (father), Dilara Bano (mother)

Ishtiyak Khan (born Istayak Arif Khan; 15 April 1976) is an Indian actor known for his work in Bollywood movies and television shows. He came into limelight for his role as english teacher in the film Phas Gaye Re Obama which also went viral as a meme in social media and he gained popularity from his role as Rajesh Autowala in Tamasha, Ludo (as Inspector), Janhit Mein Jaari (as Purushottam), Anaarkali of Aarah, as well as portraying Chaurasia in Bharat, Vasu (Lawyer from Rohtak) in Jolly LLB, Sunny in FryDay, and Munna in Ammaa Ki Boli. He is also well known for his role in Television series as Kappu Ka Sasur in the fourth season of The Kapil Sharma Show (2022), Puttan in Har Shaakh Pe Ullu Baithaa Hai, and in web series Dhindora (as Boss).

== Early life ==
Khan was born in Panna, Madhya Pradesh. He completed primary education there. In an interview, Khan stated that In 1989, he joined a theatre group named "Bharatiya Jan Natya Sangh (IPTA)". He did street play Gili Gili Fu directed by IPTA, Sri Devesh Mishra. After that, his first stage show was Ek Tha Gadha Urff Aladdad Kha, directed by Satish Sharma. He studied Rang Sangeet from Shri Baba Karant. He was selected for the National School of drama in 2004. Now he is the king of comedy.

== Filmography ==
Year	Title	Role	Director	writer
2007	The Lock (Short)	The Neighbour		
2009	Agyaat	Laxman - Sharman's Assistant		
2009	Chintu Ji	AD		
2010	Phas Gaye Re Obama	English Teacher		
2010	Tees Maar Khan	Villager		
2012	Ammaa ki boli	Munna		
2013	Saare Jahaan Se Mehnga			
2013	Jolly LLB	Vasu (Lawyer from Rohtak)		
2013	Bombay Talkies	Food eatery owner		
2013	Issaq	Reporter		
2014	Mastram	Mahesh		
2015	Jai Ho! Democracy	Santosh, Chirantan		
2015	Tamasha	Rajesh Autowala		
2015	Dolly Ki Doli	Manjot's Friend		
2017	Anaarkali of Aarah	Hiraman		
2017	Fukrey Returns	Tidda		
2018	Prem Gajra Aur Chilli Chicken (Short)	Sunil		
2018	FryDay	Sunny		
2018	Game Paisa Ladki			
2019	Bharat	Chaurasia		
2019	Baitullah (Short)	Tea Shop Owner		
2020	Sab Kushal Mangal	Sonu Bullet		
2020	Pandit Usman (Short)	Santosh		
2020	Ludo	Inspector Sukumar Sinha		
2021	200: Halla Ho	Prof. Avsare		
2021	Bunty Aur Babli 2	as Ishteyak Arif Khan		
2021	Shukrdosh	Mahendar		
2022	Janhit Mein Jaari	Purushottam		
2022	Khuda Haafiz Chapter 2 Agni Pariksha	Shailendra Thakur		
2022	Aanchhi	Chaman		
2023	Dvand: The Internal Conflict	Bhola	Yes	Yes
2024	Maidaan	Hari		
2024	Vicky Vidya Ka Woh Wala Video	Chaabiwale Chacha		
2025	Bhool Chuk Maaf	Kishan		
2025	The Networker	Pradeep Biswas		

=== Television ===
Title	Role	Year	Notes
Tota Weds Maina	Kulhad Muradabadi		Sab TV
Bunty Bubbly Ki Mummy	Ballu		Doordarshan
Peterson Hill	Tinda		Sab TV
Gudiya Humari Sabpe Bhari	Muddu	2019	And TV
Gudiya Ki Shadi	Muddu	2022	Zee Theatre
Yudh	Clown	2014	Sony TV
Comedy Ka Maha Muqabala	Multiple Role		Starplus TV
Har Shaakh Pe Ullu Baithaa Hai	Puttan	2018	Starplus TV Series
Aapkey Kamrey Mein Koi Rehta Hai	Irfan Bhai	2021	Hotstar Web Series
Dhindora	Boss	2021	Youtube Web Series
Shubh Mangal Mein Dangal	Damaad	2022	Hungama Play
The Kapil Sharma Show	Kappu Ka Sasur	2022	Sony TV Comedy Show
Commando	Sagar	2023	TV Series on Disney+ Hotstar
Life Hill Gayi	Bisht	2024	TV Series on Disney+ Hotstar

== Directing and writing ==
Khan made his directorial and writing debut with comedy-drama Dvand: The Internal Conflict which is based on a play written by William Shakespear called the Shadow Of Othello and is inspired by Vishal Bhardwaj's Omkara.

=== Ad Films ===
- Lux Venus with Amitabh Bacchan
- Udaan App with Pankaj Tripathi
- IPL promo
