= Neelesh Misra =

Indian journalist, writer, and musician

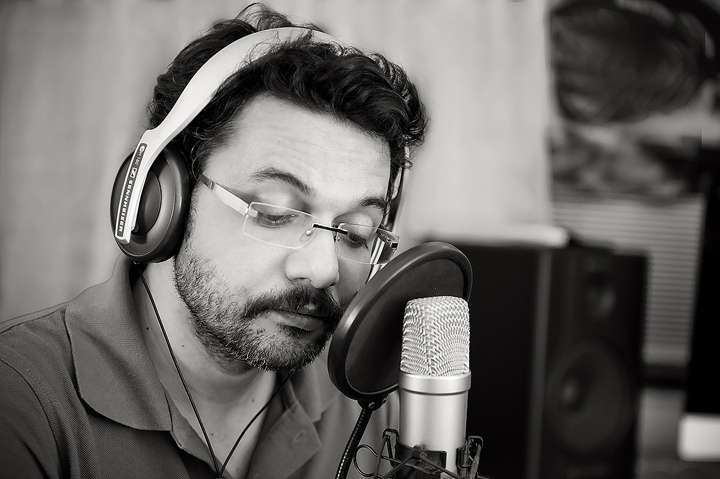
- Misra recording a poem
- Born: 4 May 1973 (age 53); Lucknow, Uttar Pradesh, India
- Education: St. Joseph's College, Nainital; Montfort Inter College; Kumaun University; Indian Institute of Mass Communication
- Occupations: Writer, lyricist, script-writer, Storyteller, journalist and entrepreneur
- Spouse(s): Nidhi Razdan (m. 2005; div. 2007) Yamini Misra
- Children: Vaidehi Misra
- Relatives: Shiva Balak Misra (father); Nirmala Misra (mother); Shailesh Misra (brother)
- Writing career
- Language: Hindi, Urdu, English
- Notable work: Yaadon Ka Idiot Box
- Notable awards: Ramnath Goenka Excellence in Journalism Awards (2007, 2012); Karpoor Chandra Kulish Memorial Award (2009)

Neelesh Misra (born 4 May 1973) is an Indian journalist, author, radio storyteller, scriptwriter and lyricist. He hosted Yaadon Ka IdiotBox on BIG FM 92.7. He is co-founder and editor of Gaon Connection, a rural newspaper. He is working on "The Neelesh Misra Show" on Red FM 93.5 and "Kahaani Express" on Saavn.

== Early life and education ==
Misra was born on 4 May 1973 to Shiva Balak Misra and Nirmala Misra. He was born in Lucknow and brought up in Nainital, Uttarakhand.

== Career ==
As a journalist, he has covered conflict and insurgency over the past two decades in South Asia, traveling deep into the hinterland. His travels have taken him from the rebel heartlands of Kashmir to Naxalite-dominated areas of central and eastern India, to the faraway north-east which is home to some of the world's longest-running insurgencies. For his reportage from India's insurgency lands, he received the Ramnath Goenka Award for Excellence in Journalism and the K.C. Kulish Memorial Award in the year 2009.

He has written five books, including The Absent State (2010), which he co-wrote with Rahul Pandita

Neelesh started his career as a Bollywood lyricist when while researching for a book in Mumbai, he met director Mahesh Bhatt, which led to his debut song Jaadu Hai Nasha Hai for Jism (2003), this was followed by hit songs like Kya Mujhe Pyaar Hai for Woh Lamhe (2006) and went on write over 20 songs in over 15 films. In 2012, he co-wrote the screenplay for Salman Khan starrer, Ek Tha Tiger, along with film's director Kabir Khan.

He was the creative director, singer and songwriter in the India's first writer-led band Called Nine, with singer Shilpa Rao and composer Amartya Rahut, working with traditional Indian craft of Qissa Goi (storytelling). The band was launched in 2010 at the annual Kala Ghoda Arts Festival in Mumbai. In 2011, the band released its debut album, Rewind, consisting of songs and storytelling, put together with narrative recited by Misra.

He is also a blogger. His blog contains his experiences during his days as senior roving editor, his thoughts on various issues, and the poems he has written. He hosts a radio show, Yadoon Ka Idiotbox on BIG FM 92.7, set in fictitious small town, Yaad Sheher, and which started its second season in 2012. He also hosts " The Neelash Mishra" show on 93.5 RED FM. In late 2012, he along with Karan Dalal, started a rural newspaper, Gaon Connection, based in Kunaura, a village near Lucknow.

Since Nov 2018, he hosts The Slow Interview With Neelesh Misra show on Youtube.

== Books ==
=== Non-fiction ===
- The Absent State (Hachette, 2010), a book on insurgency co-written. ISBN 9350093669.
- 173 Hours in Captivity, Harper Collins, 2000. ISBN 8172233949.,
- End of the Line: The Story of the Killing of the Royals in Nepal. (Penguin, 2001). ISBN 9780143027850.

=== Fiction ===
- Once Upon a Timezone. Harper Collins, 2006. ISBN 8172236646.
- Neelesh Misra ka Yaad Sheher Volumes-I and II. (Westland Books). ISBN 9382618376.

=== As editor ===
- India Yatra (Harper Collins, 2009, with a foreword by Nandan Nilekani)
- Inspired India: Ideas to Transform a Nation, Harper Collins, 2010, with a foreword by APJ Abdul Kalam. ISBN 978-81-7223-782-0
- Dream Chasing, One Man's Remarkable True Life Story, a book by his father, Dr. S.B.Misra.(Roli Books, 2011, with a foreword by Sam Pitroda. ISBN 8174368191.

== Awards ==
=== Journalism ===
- Ram Nath Goenka Award for Excellence in Journalism
- Karpoor Chandra Kulish Award
- Karpoor Chandra Kulish Merit Award

=== Entertainment ===
- Mirchi Music Award for Album of The Year at 3rd Mirchi Music Awards for Once Upon A Time In Mumbaai - Nominated
- Mirchi Music Award for Album of The Year at 4th Mirchi Music Awards for Bodyguard - Nominated
- Mirchi Music Award for Lyricist of The Year at 4th Mirchi Music Awards for "Teri Meri" from Bodyguard - Nominated
- Mirchi Music Award for Album of The Year at 10th Mirchi Music Awards for Jagga Jasoos - Nominated
- Mirchi Music Award for Listeners' Choice Album of the Year at 10th Mirchi Music Awards for Jagga Jasoos

== Personal life ==
Misra married Nidhi Razdan, a news anchor and editor, in 2005. The couple divorced in 2007.

Misra married Yamini Misra in 2008 and they had a daughter. Yamini also writes some stories for the Neelesh Misra Show.

== Filmography ==
=== Screenwriter ===
- Ek Tha Tiger (2012)
- Tiger Zinda Hai (2017)

==== Lyricist ====
- Jaadu Hai Nasha Hai – Jism (2003)
- Chalo Tumko Lekar Chalein – Jism (2003)
- Bepanah Pyaar hai – Krishna Cottage (2004)
- Maine dil Se Kaha – Rog (2005)
- Khoobsoorat Hai Vo Itna – Rog (2005)
- Guzar Na Jaaye – Rog (2005)
- Kya Mujhe Pyaar Hai – Woh Lamhe (2006)
- Lamha Lamha – Gangster (2006)
- Khwahishon Se – Holiday (2006)
- Tu hai Bhatakta Jugnu Koi – Holiday (2006)
- Neele Neele Aasmaa Taley – Holiday (2006)
- Bolo Na Tum Zara – Fight Club – Members Only (2006)
- Baalam Tera Nakhra – Big Brother (2007)
- Gulon Mein Rang Bhare – Tribute to Faiz – Sikandar (2009)
- "I Am in Love" (Male), "I Am in Love" (Reprise), "I Am in Love" (dance version), "I Am in Love" (Female) – Once Upon A Time in Mumbai (2010)
- Anjaana Anjaani ki Kahani – Anjaana Anjaani (2010)
- Abhi Kuch Dinon Se – Dil Toh Baccha Hai Ji (2011)
- Humko Pyaar Hua – Ready (2011)
- I Love You – Bodyguard (2011)
- Dil Mera Muft Ka – Agent Vinod (2012)
- Khudaaya – Shanghai (2012)
- Banjaara – Ek Tha Tiger (2012)
- Kyon – Barfi! (2012)
- Dhichkyaaon Doom Doom – Chashme Badoor (2013)
- Ishq Mohallah – Chashme Badoor (2013)
- Aala Re Aala - Shootout at Wadala (2013)
- Capuchino - I, Me Aur Main (2013)
- Jheeni Re Jheeni - Issaq (2013)
- Zindagi (Reprise) – Bajrangi Bhaijaan (2015)
- Jhumritalaiyya-Jagga Jasoos (2017)
- Phire Faqeera - Pagglait (2021)
- Thode Kam Ajnabi - Pagglait (2021)
- Eeja (2025) [Jubin Nautiyal's]
- Mann Ye Mera - Metro... In Dino (2025)
