= Jo Jeeta Wohi Sikandar =

1992 Indian film by Mansoor Khan

- Poster
- Directed by: Mansoor Khan
- Written by: Nasir Hussain; Mansoor Khan
- Produced by: Nasir Hussain
- Starring: Aamir Khan; Ayesha Jhulka; Deepak Tijori; Mamik Singh; Pooja Bedi; Kulbhushan Kharbanda; Asrani
- Cinematography: Najeeb Khan
- Edited by: Zafar Sultan; Dilip Kotalgi
- Music by: Jatin–Lalit
- Production company: Nasir Hussain Films
- Distributed by: Eros Worldwide
- Release date: 22 May 1992
- Running time: 169 mins
- Country: India
- Language: Hindi
- Box office: ₹70 million

Jo Jeeta Wohi Sikandar (transl. The one who wins is the king) also abbreviated as JJWS is a 1992 Indian Hindi-language coming-of-age sports drama film, directed and co-written by Mansoor Khan, and produced and co-written by Nasir Hussain. It stars Aamir Khan, Ayesha Jhulka, Deepak Tijori, Mamik Singh, Pooja Bedi and Kulbhushan Kharbanda in the lead.

It won two Filmfare Awards, including Best Film. The film has gained cult following along the years and has often been cited as one of the best coming-of-age films in Indian cinema.

== Plot ==
Shekhar and Ratan are sports rivals, who represent opposing colleges, Rajput and Model, respectively. Each year, they square up at the inter-college sports event, which culminates in a marathon cycle race across the hills of Dehradun. Rajput College, led by Shekhar, have dominated recent championships. Ratan narrowly loses to Shekhar at the year's cycle race, after being ahead until the race's final seconds.

Ratan trains for next year's event. He starts seeing classmate Kalpana, after having a crush on her for some time. Meanwhile, Shekhar starts going out with Devika, a new enrollee at the elite Queens' College. Devika plans to meet Shekhar at the picnic spot where Queens will have their next class trip. She is delayed, and when she finally arrives, she finds another girl in Shekhar's arms. Shekhar tries to apologise, but Devika seeks revenge. She enlists Sanjay's help, who happily obliges since he is Ratan's brother.

After their plan to embarrass Shekhar succeeds, Sanjay makes a false show of wealth in front of Devika. Unaware of his real identity, Devika starts going out with him. Anjali warns Sanjay of Devika's intentions but he takes no heed. When Devika finds out Sanjay is not actually rich, she dumps him in front of Shekhar's friends. Humiliated, Sanjay picks a fight with them. He is outnumbered, but is saved by Ratan's intervention. The next morning, Shekhar and his friends gang up on Ratan when he is out alone training. In the ensuing fight, Ratan falls off a cliff and suffers multiple injuries. He awakes from coma, but is ruled out from competing at the year's sports event.

In Ratan's absence, Sanjay competes for Model. Anjali helps him train, while Ratan offers him his new, imported cycle. During the cycle race, Shekhar and Sanjay have an altercation and fall behind the pack. They rejoin and overtake everyone, finally entering the stadium section one behind the other. Shekhar leads from Sanjay, but in the final seconds, Sanjay closes the gap to him and wins at the finish line. His victory mirrors Shekhar's win over Ratan the previous year. Model are overjoyed at defeating Rajput for the first time in decades. Cheered on by Ratan, Sanjay lifts the trophy for Model to raucous applause.

== Cast ==
- Aamir Khan as Sanjaylal Sharma "Sanju"
  - Imran Khan as Young Sanjaylal
- Ayesha Jhulka as Anjali
- Deepak Tijori as Shekhar Malhotra
- Mamik Singh as Ratanlal Sharma "Ratan"
  - Sharokh Bharucha as Young Ratanlal
- Kiran Zaveri Bhatia as Kalpana
- Sooraj Thapar as Shekhar's Friend
- Prakash Ramchandani as Shekhar's Friend
- Bobby Khanna as Shekhar's Friend
- Pooja Bedi as Devika
- Kulbhushan Kharbanda as Ramlal Sharma
- Aditya Lakhia as Maksood / Ghode
- Deven Bhojani as Ghanshyam "Ghanshu"
- Asrani as Mr. Dubey (Model school teacher)
- Faisal Khan in a special appearance (College student)
- Anjan Srivastav as Race Commentator
- Ajit Vachani as Rajput's Principal
- Deb Mukherjee as Rajput's Coach
- Ravindra Kapoor as Shakoor Miyaan
- Jatin Pandit as Xavier's college student and performer at the college dance event
- Lalit Pandit as Xavier's college student and guitarist at college dance event
- Amole Gupte as Cycle Race Commentator
- Girija Shettar as lead in the song "Arre Yaaron Mere Pyaaron"
- Ahmed Khan as Girdhari
- Shehnaz Kudia as Rukhsana aka Devika's friend and classmate
- Naushad Abbas as School fighter who gets thrown on the car and injured by Mamik
- Jahangir as Dance Judge
- Hanif Sheikh as School fighter
- Shekhar Shukla as smoking the cigarette that caught fire
- Shiraz Zack as Rita
- Miki Khan as Randheer Thapar
- Salim Khan Ding-Dong as Himself

== Production ==
The film was directed by Mansoor Khan, and written and produced by Nasir Hussain. Girija Shettar was initially chosen before she was replaced by Ayesha Jhulka after the first schedule. Akshay Kumar had auditioned, and Milind Soman was signed for Shekhar Malhotra's role, before Deepak Tijori played the role. Soman had completed 75% of his scenes before being replaced by Tijori. Aditya Pancholi was selected to play the role of Ratan, but the role went to Mamik Singh, as confirmed by DNA.

The plot has similarities to the film Breaking Away (1979) and is claimed to have been inspired by it. However, Mansoor Khan stated that he only became aware of Breaking Away after the likeness was brought to his attention, some time after the release of Jo Jeeta Wohi Sikandar. Both films have several similarities, including friendship, class barriers, bicycle racing, and parental relationship, but otherwise have different narratives, characters, motivations, treatment and racing rules. Several scenes also reference American Graffiti (1973) and Singin' in the Rain (1952).

== Music ==
Jo Jeeta Wohi Sikandar

Studio album by Jatin–Lalit and Majrooh Sultanpuri
- Released: 1992
- Recorded: 1991
- Genre: Feature film soundtrack
- Length: 35:01
- Label: Saregama
- Producer: Jatin–Lalit

Jatin–Lalit chronology
Yaara Dildara (1991)	Jo Jeeta Wohi Sikandar (1992)	Khiladi (1992)

Majrooh Sultanpuri chronology
Qayamat Se Qayamat Tak (1988)	Jo Jeeta Wohi Sikandar (1992)	Akele Hum Akele Tum (1995)

Professional ratings
Review scores
Source	Rating
Planet Bollywood	8/10 stars

The film's music was composed by Jatin–Lalit and the lyrics were penned by Majrooh Sultanpuri. Vocals for Aamir Khan were supplied by his then-frequent collaborator Udit Narayan.

The soundtrack, the second collaboration between Jatin and Lalit, helped to launch their careers. It was nominated for Best Music at the 1993 Filmfare Awards. "Pehla Nasha" was the fourth film song in Indian cinema (the first one being "Jogi O Jogi" from Lakhon Mein Ek (1971), followed by "Baare Baare" from Naagarahaavu (1972) and "Sundari Neeyum" from Michael Madana Kama Rajan (1990)) to be shot in complete slow motion. The technique was later used in many films and music videos. Pehla Nasha was the most popular track of the album and has become a cult song. Other popular tracks were "Humse Hai Sara Jahan", "Rooth Ke Humse" and "Arre Yaaron Mere Pyaaron". The song "Arre Yaaron Mere Pyaaron" was sung by Udit Narayan along with Vijeta Pandit.

Jo Jeeta Wohi Sikandar was the third best-selling Bollywood soundtrack album of 1992, having sold 2.5 million units in India.

All lyrics are written by Majrooh Sultanpuri; all music is composed by Jatin–Lalit.

No.	Title	Singer(s)	Length
1.	"Yahaan Ke Hum Sikander"	Udit Narayan, Sadhana Sargam	5:29
2.	"Naam Hai Mera Fonseca"	Amit Kumar, Alka Yagnik	4:41
3.	"Arre Yaaron Mere Pyaaron"	Udit Narayan, Vijeta Pandit	5:16
4.	"Humse Hai Sara Jahan"	Jatin Pandit, Sadhana Sargam	4:13
5.	"Pehla Nasha"	Udit Narayan, Sadhana Sargam	4:51
6.	"Rooth Ke Humse"	Jatin Pandit	5:15
7.	"Shehar Ki Pariyon"	Udit Narayan, Sadhana Sargam	5:16

== Release and reception ==
=== Box office ===
In India, Jo Jeeta Wohi Sikandar grossed ₹70 million (US$2.7 million), equivalent to ₹1,250 million (US$13 million) adjusted for inflation.

=== Critical reception ===
In a review dated 29 May 1992, The Indian Express praised Najeeb Khan's photography, the sets and the performances of Aamir Khan, Ayesha Jhulka, and Pooja Bedi, but criticised Jatin–Lalit's music.

== Awards ==
38th Filmfare Awards:

Won

- Best Film – Nasir Hussain
- Best Editing – Zafar Sultan and Dilip Katalgi

Nominated

- Best Director – Mansoor Khan
- Best Actor – Aamir Khan
- Best Supporting Actress – Pooja Bedi
- Best Music Director – Jatin–Lalit
- Best Lyricist – Majrooh Sultanpuri for "Woh Sikandar Hi Doston"
- Best Male Playback Singer – Udit Narayan for "Pehla Nasha"

== See also ==
- List of films about bicycles and cycling
