= 34th Filmfare Awards =

1989 awards for Hindi cinema

- Date: 1989

Highlights
- Best Film: Qayamat Se Qayamat Tak
- Critics Award for Best Film: Om Dar Ba Dar
- Most awards: Qayamat Se Qayamat Tak (8)
- Most nominations: Tezaab (12)

The 34th Filmfare Awards were held in 1989, after a 2-year gap. In recent years, Filmfare has made efforts to digitize and share archival content, including posting the 1989 Filmfare Awards on YouTube.

Tezaab led the ceremony with 12 nominations, followed by Qayamat Se Qayamat Tak with 11 nominations and Khoon Bhari Maang with 7 nominations.

Qayamat Se Qayamat Tak won 8 awards, including Best Film, Best Director (for Mansoor Khan), Best Male Debut (for Aamir Khan) and Best Female Debut (for Juhi Chawla), thus becoming the most-awarded film at the ceremony and catapulted Khan and Chawla to superstardom overnight.

Tezaab was the runner-up of the ceremony with 4 awards, including Best Actor (for Anil Kapoor), also catapulted Kapoor and Madhuri Dixit to superstardom overnight. The now-iconic song "Ek Do Teen" made Dixit a dance icon and the song itself fetched 2 awards – Best Female Playback Singer (for Alka Yagnik) and Best Choreography (for Saroj Khan).

== Main awards ==
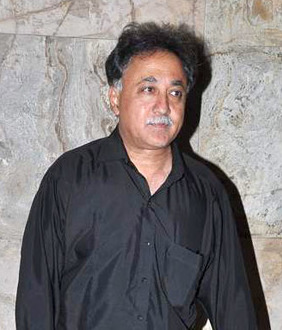
Mansoor Khan — Best Director winner for Qayamat Se Qayamat Tak

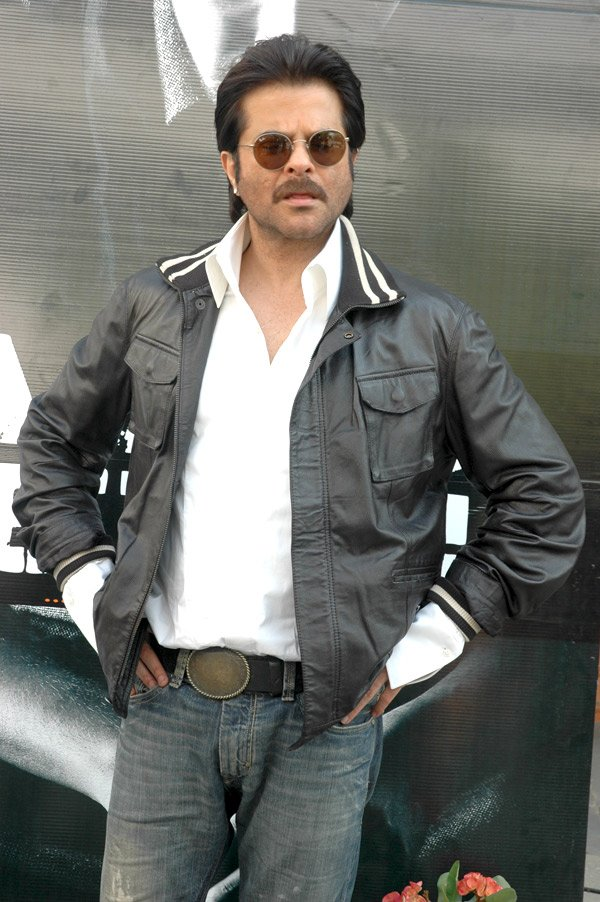
Anil Kapoor — Best Actor winner for Tezaab

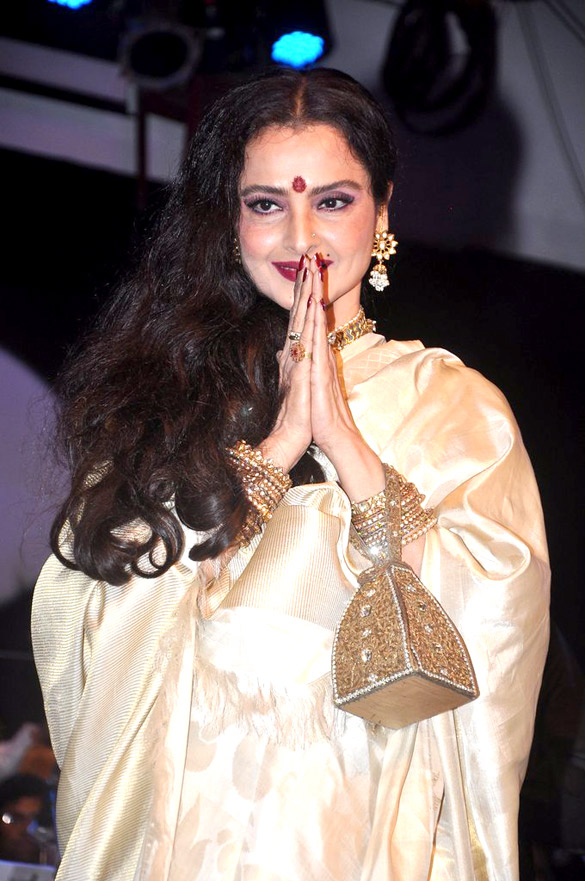
Rekha — Best Actress winner for Khoon Bhari Maang

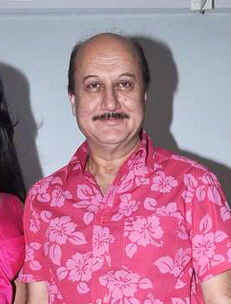
Anupam Kher — Best Supporting Actor winner for Vijay

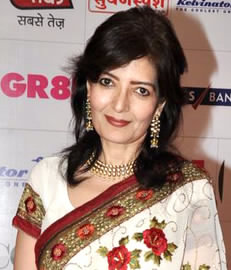
Sonu Walia — Best Supporting Actress winner for Khoon Bhari Maang

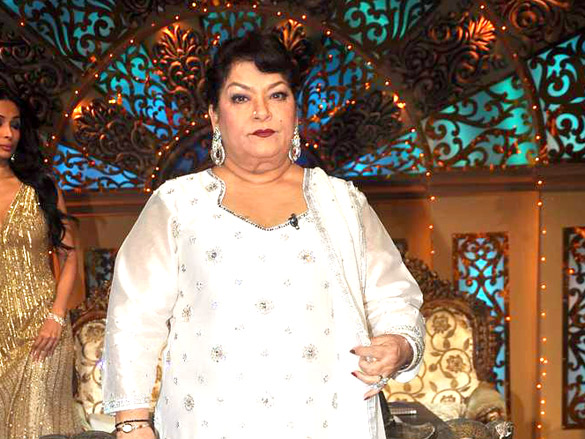
Saroj Khan — Best Choreographer winner for "Ek Do Teen" (Tezaab)

=== Best Film ===
Qayamat Se Qayamat Tak

- Khoon Bhari Maang
- Tezaab

=== Best Director ===
Mansoor Khan – Qayamat Se Qayamat Tak

- N. Chandra – Tezaab
- Rakesh Roshan – Khoon Bhari Maang

=== Best Actor ===
Anil Kapoor – Tezaab

- Aamir Khan – Qayamat Se Qayamat Tak
- Amitabh Bachchan – Shahenshah

=== Best Actress ===
Rekha – Khoon Bhari Maang

- Juhi Chawla – Qayamat Se Qayamat Tak
- Madhuri Dixit – Tezaab

=== Best Supporting Actor ===
Anupam Kher – Vijay

- Chunky Pandey – Tezaab
- Nana Patekar – Andha Yudh

=== Best Supporting Actress ===
Sonu Walia – Khoon Bhari Maang

- Anuradha Patel – Ijaazat
- Pallavi Joshi – Andha Yudh

=== Best Debut ===
Aamir Khan – Qayamat Se Qayamat Tak

=== Lux New Face of the Year ===
Juhi Chawla – Qayamat Se Qayamat Tak

=== Best Story ===
Ijaazat – Subodh Ghosh

=== Best Screenplay ===
Qayamat Se Qayamat Tak – Nasir Hussain

=== Best Dialogue ===
Tezaab – Kamlesh Pandey

=== Best Music Director ===
Qayamat Se Qayamat Tak – Anand–Milind

- Khoon Bhari Maang – Rajesh Roshan
- Tezaab – Laxmikant–Pyarelal

=== Best Lyricist ===
Ijaazat – Gulzar for Mera Kuch Saamaan

- Qayamat Se Qayamat Tak – Majrooh Sultanpuri for Papa Kehte Hain
- Tezaab – Javed Akhtar for Ek Do Teen

=== Best Playback Singer, Male ===
Qayamat Se Qayamat Tak – Udit Narayan for Papa Kehte Hain

- Dayavan – Mohammad Aziz for Dil Tera Kisne Toda
- Tezaab – Amit Kumar for Ek Do Teen

=== Best Playback Singer, Female ===
Tezaab – Alka Yagnik for Ek Do Teen

- Khoon Bhari Maang – Sadhana Sargam for Main Teri Hoon Jaanam
- Tezaab – Anuradha Paudwal for Keh Do Ke Tum

=== Best Art Direction ===
Hatya – Liladhar S. Sawant

=== Best Choreography ===
Tezaab – Saroj Khan for Ek Do Teen

=== Best Cinematography ===
Qayamat Se Qayamat Tak – Kiran Deohans

=== Best Editing ===
Khoon Bhari Maang – Sanjay Varma

=== Best Sound ===
Hatya – J. P. Sehgal

== Critics' awards ==
=== Best Film ===
Om Dar Ba Dar

== Most Wins ==
- Qayamat Se Qayamat Tak – 8/11
- Tezaab – 4/12
- Khoon Bhari Maang – 3/7
- Hatya – 2/2
- Ijaazat – 2/2
- Vijay – 1/1

== See also ==
- 35th Filmfare Awards
- Filmfare Awards
