= 41st Filmfare Awards =

1996 awards for Hindi cinema

- Date: 2 March 1996

Highlights
- Best Film: Dilwale Dulhania Le Jayenge
- Critics Award for Best Film: Bombay
- Most awards: Dilwale Dulhania Le Jayenge (10)
- Most nominations: Dilwale Dulhania Le Jayenge and Rangeela (14)

The 41st Filmfare Awards were held on 2 March 1996.

Dilwale Dulhania Le Jayenge, considered one of the most successful films of Bollywood, and Rangeela led the ceremony with 14 nominations each, followed by Karan Arjun with 10 nominations.

Dilwale Dulhania Le Jayenge won 10 awards – a record at the time – including Best Film, Best Director (Aditya Chopra), Best Actor (Shah Rukh Khan), Best Actress (Kajol) and Best Supporting Actress (Farida Jalal), thus becoming the most-awarded film at the ceremony.

Other films winning multiple awards included Rangeela with 7, Barsaat with 4 and Karan Arjun with 2 awards.

Madhuri Dixit received dual nominations for Best Actress for her performances in Raja and Yaraana, but lost to Kajol who won the award for Dilwale Dulhania Le Jayenge.

Kajol won her first of a record-setting five awards for Best Actress for her performance in Dilwale Dulhania Le Jayenge.

A. R. Rahman won his first Best Music Director award at Filmfare for his first Hindi film Rangeela.

== Main awards ==
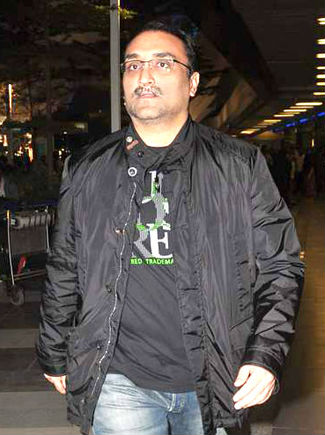
Aditya Chopra — Best Director winner for Dilwale Dulhania Le Jayenge

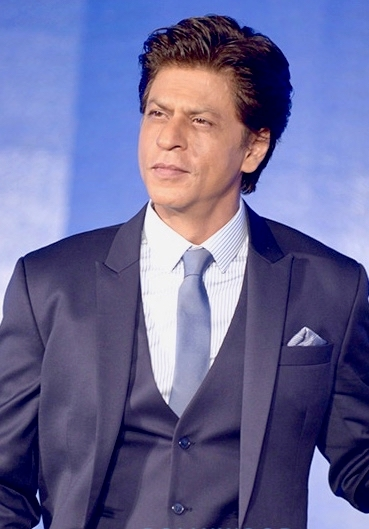
Shah Rukh Khan — Best Actor winner for Dilwale Dulhania Le Jayenge

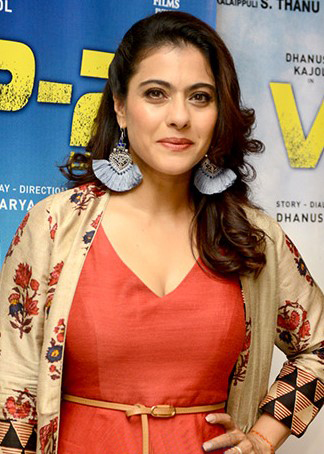
Kajol — Best Actress winner for Dilwale Dulhania Le Jayenge

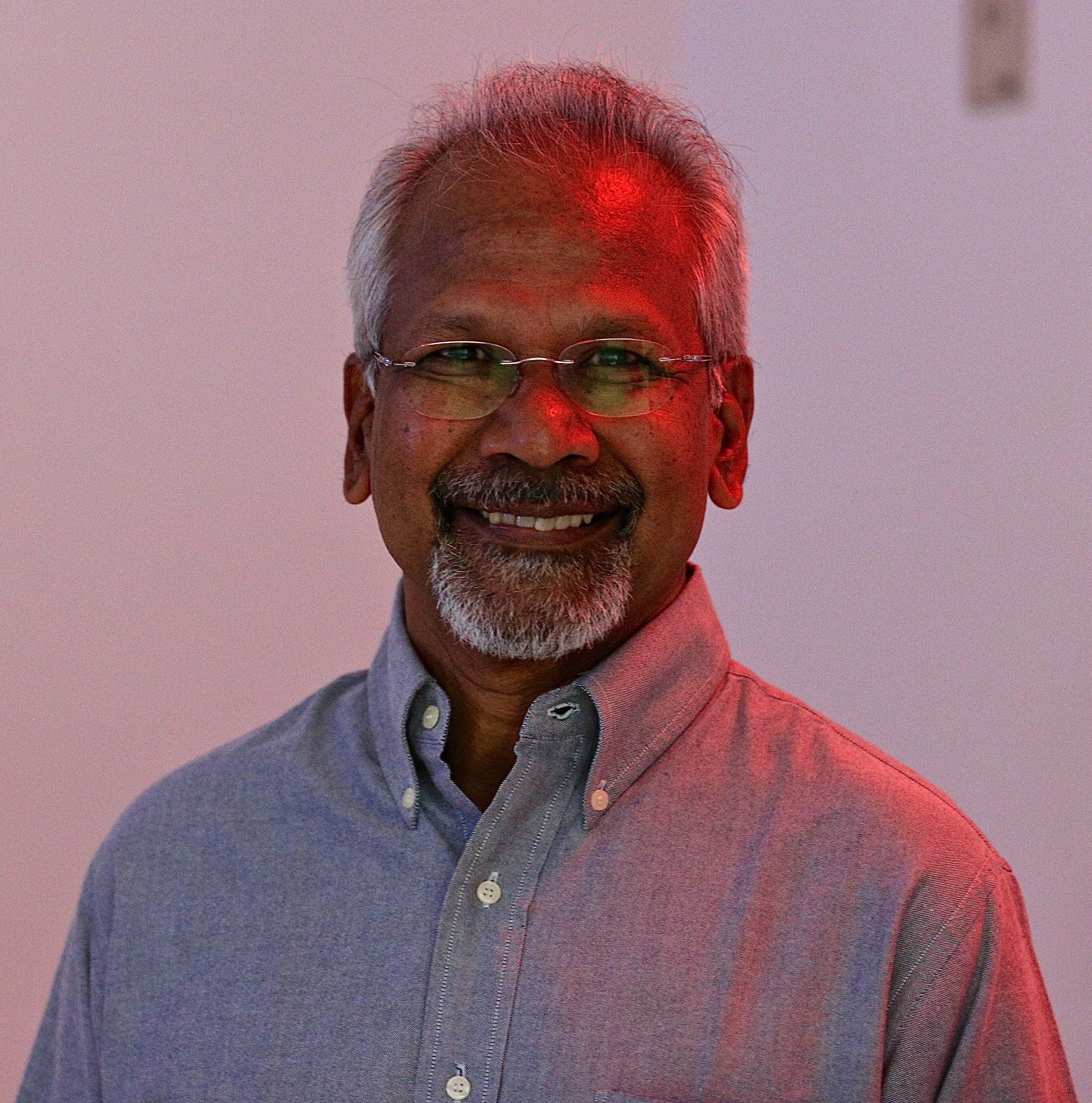
Mani Ratnam — Best Director Critics winner for Bombay

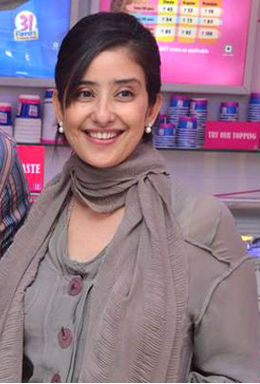
Manisha Koirala — Best Actress Critics winner for Bombay

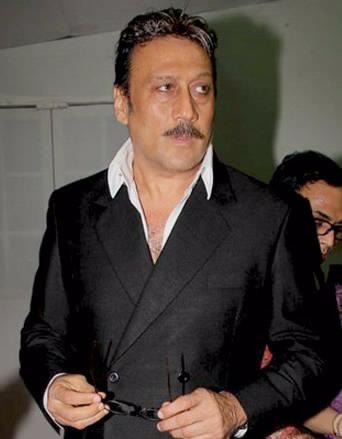
Jackie Shroff — Best Supporting Actor winner for Rangeela

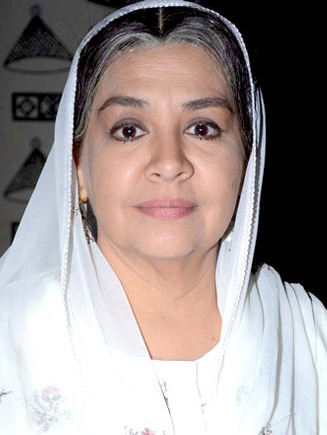
Farida Jalal — Best Supporting Actress winner for Dilwale Dulhania Le Jayenge

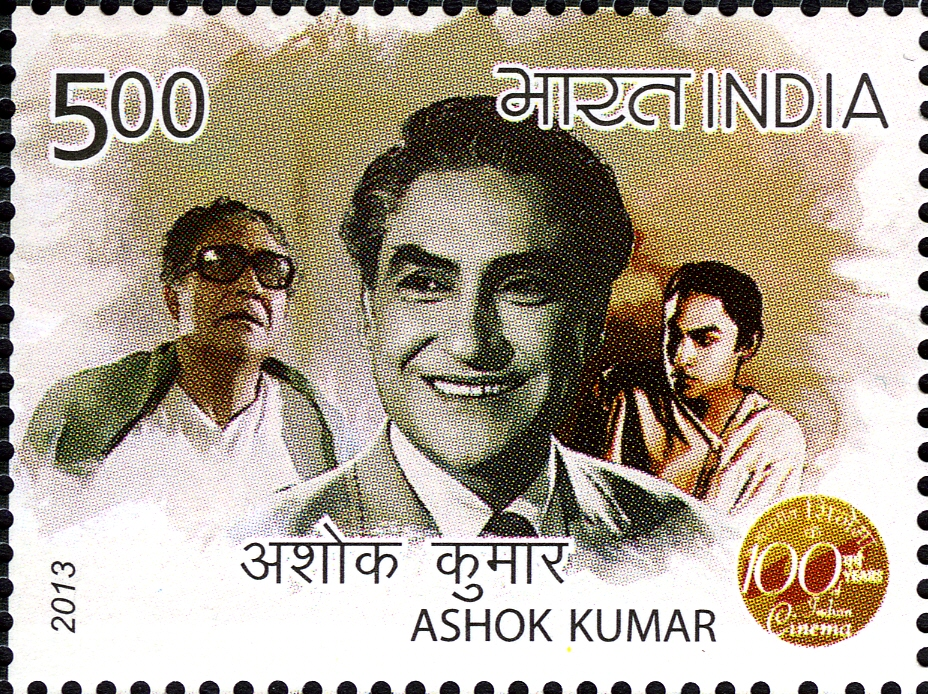
Ashok Kumar — Lifetime Achievement Awardee

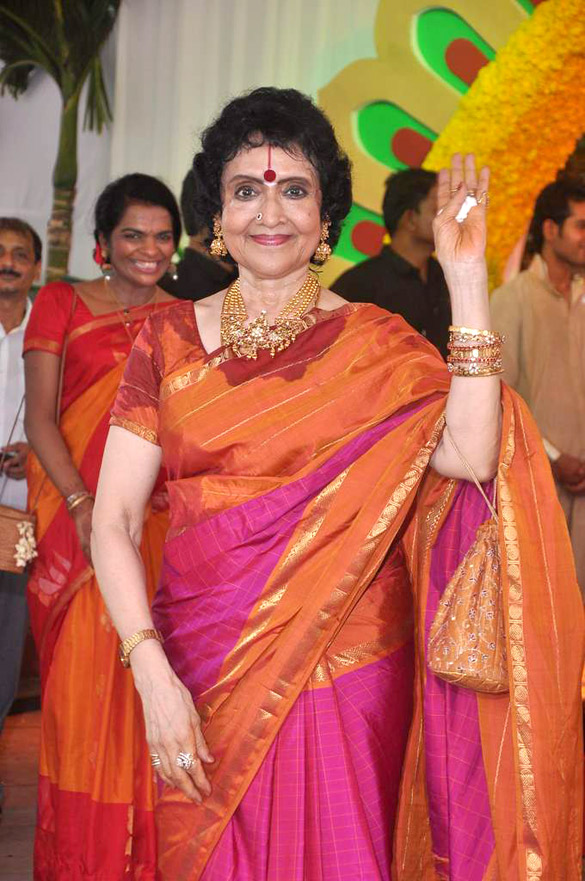
Vyjayanthimala — Lifetime Achievement Awardee

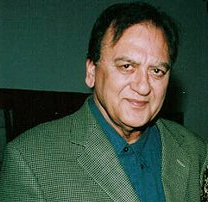
Sunil Dutt — Lifetime Achievement Awardee

Best Film	Best Director	
Dilwale Dulhaniya Le Jayenge: Akele Hum Akele Tum; Karan Arjun; Raja; Rangeela	Aditya Chopra – Dilwale Dulhaniya Le Jayenge: Indra Kumar – Raja; Mansoor Khan – Akele Hum Akele Tum; Rakesh Roshan – Karan Arjun; Ram Gopal Verma – Rangeela	
Best Actor	Best Actress	
Shah Rukh Khan – Dilwale Dulhaniya Le Jayenge: Aamir Khan – Rangeela; Ajay Devgan – Naajayaz; Govinda – Coolie No.1; Salman Khan – Karan Arjun	Kajol – Dilwale Dulhaniya Le Jayenge: Madhuri Dixit – Raja; Madhuri Dixit – Yaraana; Manisha Koirala – Akele Hum Akele Tum; Urmila Matondkar – Rangeela	
Best Supporting Actor	Best Supporting Actress	
Jackie Shroff – Rangeela: Amrish Puri – Dilwale Dulhaniya Le Jayenge; Anil Kapoor – Trimurti; Naseeruddin Shah – Naajayaz; Paresh Rawal – Raja	Farida Jalal – Dilwale Dulhaniya Le Jayenge: Aruna Irani – Kartavya; Raakhee – Karan Arjun; Rita Bhaduri – Raja; Tanvi Azmi – Akele Hum Akele Tum	
Best Performance in a Negative Role	Best Performance in a Comic Role	
Mithun Chakraborty – Jallad: Amrish Puri – Karan Arjun; Ashish Vidyarthi – Drohkaal; Danny Denzongpa – Barsaat; Mohan Agashe – Trimurti	Anupam Kher – Dilwale Dulhaniya Le Jayenge: Ashok Saraf – Karan Arjun; Johnny Lever – Karan Arjun; Kader Khan – Coolie No.1	
Best Music Director	Best Lyricist	
Rangeela – A. R. Rahman: Akele Hum Akele Tum – Anu Malik; Dilwale Dulhania Le Jayenge – Jatin–Lalit; Karan Arjun – Rajesh Roshan; Raja – Nadeem-Shravan	Dilwale Dulhaniya Le Jayenge – Anand Bakshi for Tujhe Dekha To: Akele Hum Akele Tum – Majrooh Sultanpuri for Raja Ko Rani Se; Dilwale Dulhaniya Le Jayenge – Anand Bakshi for Ho Gaya Hai Tujhko; Rangeela – Mehboob for Kya Karen; Rangeela – Mehboob for Tanha Tanha	
Best Male Playback Singer	Best Female Playback Singer	
Dilwale Dulhaniya Le Jayenge – Udit Narayan for Mehndi Laga Ke Rakhna: Akele Hum Akele Tum – Udit Narayan for Raja Ko Rani Se; Dilwale Dulhaniya Le Jayenge – Kumar Sanu for Tujhe Dekha To; Criminal — Kumar Sanu for Tum Mile Dil; Haqeeqat – Hariharan for Dil Ne Dil	Yaraana – Kavita Krishnamurthy for Mera Piya Ghar Aaya: Akele Hum Akele Tum – Alka Yagnik for Raja Ko Rani Se; Raja – Alka Yagnik for Akhiyan Milaun; Rangeela – Kavita Krishnamurthy for Pyaar Yeh Jaane; Rangeela – Shweta Shetty for Mangta Hai Kya	-

=== Technical Awards ===
Best Story	Best Screenplay
Rangeela – Ram Gopal Verma	Dilwale Dulhaniya Le Jayenge – Aditya Chopra
Best Dialogue	Best Action
Dilwale Dulhaniya Le Jayenge – Aditya Chopra and Javed Siddiqui	Karan Arjun – Bhiku Varma
Best Editing	Best Sound
Karan Arjun – Sanjay Verma	Barsaat – Rakesh Ranjan
Best Cinematography	Best Choreography
Barsaat – Santosh Sivan	Rangeela – Ahmed Khan for Rangeela Re
Best Costume Design	Best Art Direction
Rangeela – Manish Malhotra	Prem – Bijon Dasgupta

=== Special awards ===
Best Male Debut

Bobby Deol – Barsaat

Best Female Debut

Twinkle Khanna – Barsaat

R. D. Burman Award

Mehboob

Special Award

Asha Bhosle 'for the song "Tanha Tanha" in Rangeela. Long back, she stopped accepting nominations for Best Female Playback Singer, so Filmfare awarded her the Special Award for her rendition.

Lifetime Achievement Award

Ashok Kumar, Vyjayanthimala and Sunil Dutt

== Critics' awards ==
=== Best Film ===
Bombay

=== Best Actress ===
Manisha Koirala – Bombay

=== Best Documentary ===
A Narmada Diary

== See also ==
- 42nd Filmfare Awards
- Filmfare Awards
