= 41st National Film Awards =

1994 Indian film award

- Awarded for: Best of Indian cinema in 1993
- Awarded by: Directorate of Film Festivals
- Presented by: Shankar Dayal Sharma (President of India)
- Announced on: 21 April 1994
- Presented on: 30 September 1994
- Official website: dff.nic.in

Highlights
- Best Feature Film: Charachar
- Best Non-Feature Film: Maihar Raag
- Best Book: Naalo Nenu
- Best Film Critic: Pritiman Sarkar
- Dadasaheb Phalke Award: Majrooh Sultanpuri
- Most awards: • Muhafiz • Ponthan Mada (4)

The 41st National Film Awards, presented by Directorate of Film Festivals, the organisation set up by Ministry of Information and Broadcasting, India to felicitate the best of Indian Cinema released in the year 1993. Ceremony took place in 1994.

With 41st National Film Awards, a new award for Best Non-Feature Film Music Direction was introduced for non-feature films section awarded with Rajat Kamal (Silver Lotus).

== Awards ==
Awards were divided into feature films, non-feature films and books written on Indian cinema.

=== Lifetime Achievement Award ===
Name of Award	Image	Awardee(s)	Awarded As	Awards
Dadasaheb Phalke Award		Majrooh Sultanpuri	Lyricist	Swarna Kamal, ₹ 100,000 and a Shawl

=== Feature films ===
Feature films were awarded at All India as well as regional level. For 41st National Film Awards, a Bengali film, Charachar won the National Film Award for Best Feature Film whereas an Urdu film, Muhafiz along with a Malayalam film, Ponthan Mada won the maximum number of awards (4). Following were the awards given in each category:

==== Juries ====
A committee headed by T. Subbarami Reddy was appointed to evaluate the feature films awards. Following were the jury members:

- Jury Members
  - T. Subbarami Reddy (Chairperson) • Gautam Bora • Madhabi Mukherjee • Salil Chowdhury • Bidhu Bhusan Das • Hariharan • Sitakant Misra • Nachiket Patwardhan • J. L. Ralhan • B. Narsing Rao • R. C. Sakthi • Valampuri Somanathan • Vijaya

==== All India Award ====
Following were the awards given:

===== Golden Lotus Award =====
Official Name: Swarna Kamal

All the awardees are awarded with 'Golden Lotus Award (Swarna Kamal)', a certificate and cash prize.

Name of Award	Name of Film	Language	Awardee(s)	Cash prize
Best Feature Film	Charachar	Bengali	Producer: M/s Gope Movies Pvt Ltd.	₹ 50,000/-
Best Feature Film	Charachar	Bengali	director: Buddhadeb Dasgupta	₹ 25,000/-
Best Feature Film	Citation: For its poetic and typical representation of the eternal human longing for liberation and man's alienation from Nature.			
Best Debut Film of a Director	Sunya Theke Suru	Bengali	Producer: H. Das, Madhumanti Maitra and M. Das; Director: Ashoke Viswanathan	₹ 25,000/- Each
Best Debut Film of a Director	Citation: For its creative handling of sensitive subject, exhibiting the socio-political situation of out society, spanning three decades.			
Best Popular Film Providing Wholesome Entertainment	Manichitrathazhu	Malayalam	Producer: Appachan	₹ 40,000/-
Best Popular Film Providing Wholesome Entertainment	Manichitrathazhu	Malayalam	Director: Fazil	₹ 20,000/-
Best Popular Film Providing Wholesome Entertainment	Citation: For handling an unusual subject of psychological aberration in a conservative society and the ultimate acceptance of a modern approach.			
Best Popular Film Providing Wholesome Entertainment	Darr	Hindi	Producer: Yash Chopra	₹ 40,000/-
Best Popular Film Providing Wholesome Entertainment	Darr	Hindi	Director: Yash Chopra	₹ 20,000/-
Best Popular Film Providing Wholesome Entertainment	Citation: For its convincing presentation of the theme of love, which has been rendered complex by its relationship with past experiences of fear.			
Best Children's Film	Lavanya Preeti	Oriya	Producer: National Center of Films for Children and Young People	₹ 30,000/-
Best Children's Film	Lavanya Preeti	Oriya	Director: A. K. Bir	₹ 15,000/-
Best Children's Film	Citation: For its subtle and delicate exposition of the growing-up process from childhood to adolescence through the use of myths and striking visuals.			
Best Direction	Ponthan Mada	Malayalam	T. V. Chandran	₹ 50,000/-
Best Direction	Citation: For a masterly rendering of a whole range of human experience into celluloid poetry.			

===== Silver Lotus Award =====
Official Name: Rajat Kamal

All the awardees are awarded with 'Silver Lotus Award (Rajat Kamal)', a certificate and cash prize.

Name of Award	Name of Film	Language	Awardee(s)	Cash prize
Best Feature Film on National Integration	Sardar	Hindi	Producer: Haribhai M. Patel	₹ 30,000/-
Best Feature Film on National Integration	Sardar	Hindi	Director: Ketan Mehta	₹ 15,000/-
Best Feature Film on National Integration	Citation: For presenting a panoramic view of India in a period of transition to reveal the goals of nationalism by the integration of a mass disparate materials and shaping them into a coherent saga of Indian nationalism in an epic style.			
Best Film on Family Welfare	Akashadoothu	Malayalam	Producer: Anupama Cinema	₹ 30,000/-
Best Film on Family Welfare	Akashadoothu	Malayalam	Director: Siby Malayil	₹ 15,000/-
Best Film on Family Welfare	Citation: For the urgency of family welfare through human love and compassion.			
Best Film on Other Social Issues	Janani	Bengali	Producer: Sanat Dasgupta	₹ 30,000/-
Best Film on Other Social Issues	Janani	Bengali	Director: Sanat Dasgupta	₹ 15,000/-
Best Film on Other Social Issues	Citation: For its delicate portrayal of an obscurantist practice like witchcraft, prevalent in certain parts of the country.			
Best Film on Other Social Issues	Naaraayam	Malayalam	Producer: Raju Pilakat	₹ 30,000/-
Best Film on Other Social Issues	Naaraayam	Malayalam	Director: Sasi Shanker	₹ 15,000/-
Best Film on Other Social Issues	Citation: For its subdued depiction of the possibilities of realising communal harmony.			
Best Film on Environment / Conservation / Preservation	Devara Kadu	Kannada	Producer: Pattabhirami Reddy Productions	₹ 30,000/-
Best Film on Environment / Conservation / Preservation	Devara Kadu	Kannada	Director: Pattabhirami Reddy Tikkavarapu	₹ 15,000/-
Best Film on Environment / Conservation / Preservation	Citation: For presenting the two themes of "Back to Village" and "Preservation of Nature" by an imaginative use of myths and legends.			
Best Actor	• Ponthan Mada • Vidheyan	Malayalam	Mammootty	₹ 10,000/-
Best Actor	Citation: For his sensitive portrayal in the film Ponthan Mada of the role of an outsider and in Vidheyan for the depiction of the relationship of power and terror at an existential level.			
Best Actress	Manichithrathazhu	Malayalam	Shobana	₹ 10,000/-
Best Actress	Citation: For her unusual capacity to reveal complex nuances of a variety of human emotions.			
Best Supporting Actor	• Woh Chokri • Sir	Hindi	Paresh Rawal	₹ 10,000/-
Best Supporting Actor	Citation: For his performances in the films to reveal contradictory human emotions at the outer and inner levels.			
Best Supporting Actress	Woh Chokri	Hindi	Neena Gupta	₹ 10,000/-
Best Supporting Actress	Citation: For a realistic portrayal of a loving mother and a betrayed wife, revealing shades of love, hate and anxiety.			
Best Child Artist	Lavanya Preeti	Oriya	Tarasankar Misra	₹ 5,000/-
Best Child Artist	Citation: For depicting successfully the process of growing up from childhood to adolescence and the first awareness of sexuality.			
Best Male Playback Singer	Sopanam	Malayalam	K. J. Yesudas	₹ 10,000/-
Best Male Playback Singer	Citation: For his superb capacity to render a variety of moods by means of a rich and melodious voice, which is capable of delineating both the range and depth of human emotions.			
Best Female Playback Singer	Hum Hain Rahi Pyar Ke	Hindi	Alka Yagnik	₹ 10,000/-
Best Female Playback Singer	Citation: For her ability to identify herself with the characters and render the delicate nuances of human feelings in complex situations.			
Best Cinematography	Ponthan Mada	Malayalam	Cameraman: Venu; Laboratory Processing: Prasad Film Laboratories	₹ 10,000/- Each
Best Cinematography	Citation: For the masterly use of the camera, in order to capture the feel of the background, setting, atmosphere of the subject and making use of striking visuals to communicate the theme.			
Best Screenplay	Uttoran	Bengali	Satyajit Ray (Posthumously)	₹ 10,000/-
Best Screenplay	Citation: For designing and structuring a screenplay from an imaginative and aesthetic angle, with a superb control over the unity of impressions.			
Best Audiography	Mahanadhi	Tamil	• H. Sridhar • K. M. Surya Narayan (M/s Media Artiste Pvt. Ltd)	₹ 10,000/-
Best Audiography	Citation: For their capacity to the use of technique to contribute to the total effect of the film as an audio-visual gestalt.			
Best Editing	Sardar	Hindi	Renu Saluja	₹ 10,000/-
Best Editing	Citation: For combining expertise with artistry in a diverse and disparate series of sequences into a memorable experience of epic cinema.			
Best Art Direction	Muhafiz	Urdu	Suresh Sawant	₹ 10,000/-
Best Art Direction	Citation: For recreating architecture, landscape and interiors of exceptional beauty and cinematic integrity, synchronised to perfection with the thematic content of the protagonist's search for the poetry of an ailing maestro.			
Best Costume Design	Muhafiz	Urdu	Loveleen Bains	₹ 10,000/-
Best Costume Design	Citation: For recreating an entire spectrum of costumes, representing not only the protagonist, the ageing litterateur and his closeted world, but the entire milieu of the city and the small town.			
Best Music Direction	Ponthan Mada	Malayalam	Johnson	₹ 10,000/-
Best Music Direction	Citation: For his music, which exhibits imagination, competence and presentation of the changing contours of music from traditional to modern styles.			
Best Lyrics	Mathru Devo Bhava ("Raalipoye Puvva")	Telugu	Veturi	₹ 10,000/-
Best Lyrics	Citation: For his lyric "Raalipoye Puvva", which demonstrates his poetic imagination, enriched by his deep experience of life and a consequential competence in using language with felicity.			
Best Special Effects	Thiruda Thiruda	Tamil	Sethu	₹ 10,000/-
Best Special Effects	Citation: For professional and apt handling of spectacular scenes on a large scale, contributing significantly to the overall impact of the film.			
Best Choreography	Thiruda Thiruda	Tamil	Sundaram	₹ 10,000/-
Best Choreography	Citation: For the orchestration of scores of dancers in unison, with massive sets, stunning light effects and foot thumping music.			
Special Jury Award	Muhafiz	Urdu	Shashi Kapoor	₹ 25,000/- Each
Special Jury Award	Citation: For a sensitive portrayal of the feeling of the poet, who is a representative of a dying humanistic culture, in course of which the life of imagination is undermined by the pressure of materialistic values.			₹ 25,000/- Each
Special Jury Award	Woh Chokri	Hindi	Pallavi Joshi	₹ 25,000/- Each
Special Jury Award	Citation: For enacting competently and realistically, a whole gamut of experiences and emotions, embracing a women's life from childhood to adulthood.			₹ 25,000/- Each
Special Mention	Hum Hain Rahi Pyar Ke	Hindi	• Tahir Hussain (Producer) • Mahesh Bhatt (Director)	Certificate Only
Special Mention	Citation: For an enjoyable and wholesome entertainment at the level of innocent comedy.			Certificate Only
Special Mention	Indradhanura Chhai	Oriya	• Jugal Debata (Producer) • Susant Mishra (Director)	Certificate Only
Special Mention	Citation: For their film, a sensitive exploration of a woman's experience of loneliness in the context of the inexorable passage of time, culminating on a positive note of redemption through symbolic images.			Certificate Only

==== Regional Awards ====
The award is given to best film in the regional languages in India.

Name of Award	Name of Film	Awardee(s)	Cash prize
Best Feature Film in Assamese	Abartan	Producer: Bhabendra Nath Saikia	₹ 20,000/-
Best Feature Film in Assamese	Abartan	Director: Bhabendra Nath Saikia	₹ 10,000/-
Best Feature Film in Assamese	Citation: For a successful experiment in the dramatic technique of a play-within-a-play to reveal the relationship of appearances to reality.		
Best Feature Film in Bengali	Antareen	Producer: NFDC and Doordarshan	₹ 20,000/-
Best Feature Film in Bengali	Antareen	Director: Mrinal Sen	₹ 10,000/-
Best Feature Film in Bengali	Citation: For a sensitive exploration of modern man's loneliness and the failure of human communication in a dehumanised civilization.		
Best Feature Film in Gujarati	Manvini Bhavai	Producer: Aashish Trivedi and Upendra Trivedi	₹ 20,000/-
Best Feature Film in Gujarati	Manvini Bhavai	Director: Upendra Trivedi	₹ 10,000/-
Best Feature Film in Gujarati	Citation: For depicting the drought-torn lives of villagers through the eyes of the protagonist.		
Best Feature Film in Hindi	Patang	Producer: Sanjay Sahay and Durba Sahay	₹ 20,000/-
Best Feature Film in Hindi	Patang	Director: Gautam Ghose	₹ 10,000/-
Best Feature Film in Hindi	Citation: For a restrained and symbolic portrayal of love and betrayal and of the various layers of moral corruption, which overpower the lives of innocents.		
Best Feature Film in Kannada	Chinnari Mutha	Producer: Nagini Nagabharana, Saroja and Nandakumar	₹ 20,000/-
Best Feature Film in Kannada	Chinnari Mutha	Director: T. S. Nagabharana	₹ 10,000/-
Best Feature Film in Kannada	Citation: For an imaginative rendering of a child's growing-up process, in terms of the widening ambiance of human life.		
Best Feature Film in Malayalam	Vidheyan	Producer: K. Ravindran Nair	₹ 20,000/-
Best Feature Film in Malayalam	Vidheyan	Director: Adoor Gopalakrishnan	₹ 10,000/-
Best Feature Film in Malayalam	Citation: For its in-depth handling and complex delineation of the psychological evolution of two characters, representative of the transformation of terror into power and its hold over the life of the existentialist outsider.		
Best Feature Film in Manipuri	Sambal Wangma	Producer: Sobita Devi	₹ 20,000/-
Best Feature Film in Manipuri	Sambal Wangma	Director: K. Ibohal	₹ 10,000/-
Best Feature Film in Manipuri	Citation: For correlating the integration of Man with Nature for the development of the human personality.		
Best Feature Film in Marathi	Lapandav	Producer: Sachin Parekar and Sanjay Parekar	₹ 20,000/-
Best Feature Film in Marathi	Lapandav	Director: Shraboni Deodhar	₹ 10,000/-
Best Feature Film in Marathi	Citation: For its clever portrayal of comedy of errors, cutting across the generation gap and for its charming depiction of puppy-love, extending from the campus to the homes of today's youth, in a refreshing directorial debut.		
Best Feature Film in Oriya	Aranya Rodan	Producer: Prasan Prusti	₹ 20,000/-
Best Feature Film in Oriya	Aranya Rodan	Director: Biplab Ray Chaudhuri	₹ 10,000/-
Best Feature Film in Oriya	Citation: For its very sensitive and cinematic handling of an urban journalist's quest to understand the complexities of tribal life, seen through the eyes of an orphaned boy.		
Best Feature Film in Punjabi	Kachehri	Producer: Vijay Tandon	₹ 20,000/-
Best Feature Film in Punjabi	Kachehri	Director: Ravindra Peepat	₹ 10,000/-
Best Feature Film in Punjabi	Citation: For highlighting the vulnerability of the judicial system, in which sometimes justification prevails over justice.		
Best Feature Film in Tamil	Mahanadhi	Producer: S. A. Rajkannu	₹ 20,000/-
Best Feature Film in Tamil	Mahanadhi	Director: Santhana Bharathi	₹ 10,000/-
Best Feature Film in Tamil	Citation: For depicting the aspiration and frustrations of the protagonist, his separation from reunion with his children, spanning a vast canvas of various cinema skills put together into an epic saga of a struggle against justice.		
Best Feature Film in Telugu	Mister Pellam	Producer: Gavara Partha Sarathi	₹ 20,000/-
Best Feature Film in Telugu	Mister Pellam	Director: Bapu	₹ 10,000/-
Best Feature Film in Telugu	Citation: For its satirical exploration of the myth of the male ego, being superior to that of female.		
Best Feature Film in Urdu	Muhafiz	Producer: Wahid Chowhan	₹ 20,000/-
Best Feature Film in Urdu	Muhafiz	Director: Ismail Merchant	₹ 10,000/-
Best Feature Film in Urdu	Citation: A breath-taking film, uniting the various film arts, crafts and technical skills into an integrated experience, with lasting images of a dying culture, in which a humanistic vision of life is being undermined by encroachment from acquisitive commercialism.		

Best Feature Film in Each of the Language Other Than Those Specified in the Schedule VIII of the Constitution

Name of Award	Name of Film	Awardee(s)	Cash prize
Best Feature Film in Kodava	Mandhara Phu	Producer: B. N. Ravishankar	₹ 20,000/-
Best Feature Film in Kodava	Mandhara Phu	Director: S. R. Rajan	₹ 10,000/-
Best Feature Film in Kodava	Citation: For depicting how unusual parental love affects children's life adversely too.		
Best Feature Film in Tulu	Bangara Patler	Producer: Richard Castellano	₹ 20,000/-
Best Feature Film in Tulu	Bangara Patler	Director: Richard Castellano	₹ 10,000/-
Best Feature Film in Tulu	Citation: For depicting how money-power can take away everything from a simple and innocent community of villagers, using muscle power and political force.		

=== Non-Feature Films ===
Short Films made in any Indian language and certified by the Central Board of Film Certification as a documentary/newsreel/fiction are eligible for non-feature film section.

==== Juries ====
A committee headed by Bikram Singh was appointed to evaluate the non-feature films awards. Following were the jury members:

- Jury Members
  - Bikram Singh (Chairperson) • Gulzar • Paresh Mehta • K. R. Mohanan • Tanusree Shankar

==== Golden Lotus Award ====
Official Name: Swarna Kamal

All the awardees are awarded with 'Golden Lotus Award (Swarna Kamal)', a certificate and cash prize.

Name of Award	Name of Film	Language	Awardee(s)	Cash prize
Best Non-Feature Film	Maihar Raag	Bengali	Producer: Sunil Shanbag; Director: Arun Bhattacharjee	₹ 15,000/- Each
Best Non-Feature Film	Citation: For presenting a candid and spontaneous portrayal of the decay of our heritage, as it is being engulfed by clouds of heartless commercialism.			

==== Silver Lotus Award ====
Official Name: Rajat Kamal

All the awardees are awarded with 'Silver Lotus Award (Rajat Kamal)' and cash prize.

Name of Award	Name of Film	Language	Awardee(s)	Cash prize
Best First Non-Feature Film	Bazar Sitaram	Hindi	Producer: Neena Gupta for Films Division; Director: Neena Gupta	₹ 10,000/- Each
Best First Non-Feature Film	Citation: For presenting a delicate and sensitive portrayal of the culture, traditions and milieu of Old Delhi as a personalised experience.			
Best Anthropological / Ethnographic Film	Ladakh – Life Along the Indus	English	Producer: Bappa Ray; Director: Bappa Ray	₹ 10,000/- Each
Best Anthropological / Ethnographic Film	Citation: For a visually enchanting depiction of the life patterns of the people living along the River Indus in Ladakh, with rich details emerging from their environment.			
Best Biographical Film	Colors of Absence	English	Producer: Shanta Gokhale and Arun Khopkar; Director: Arun khopkar	₹ 10,000/- Each
Best Biographical Film	Citation: For a beautifully crafted and successful presentation of the biography of the painter, Jehangir Sabavala, through his work. The sound design of the film has also been meticulously conceived.			
Best Arts / Cultural Film	Anukampan	Hindi	Producer: Balaka Ghosh; Director: Balaka Ghosh	₹ 10,000/- Each
Best Arts / Cultural Film	Citation: For focussing attention on a unique intermingling of classical and folk dance traditions which is in danger of extinction through an appealing film form.			
Best Environment / Conservation / Preservation Film	Orchids of Manipur	Meitei	Producer: Tomchou Singh; Director: Aribam Syam Sharma	₹ 10,000/- Each
Best Environment / Conservation / Preservation Film	Citation: For a colourful and extremely aesthetic presentation of the exalting abundance of the wild orchids of Manipur.			
Best Promotional Film	Timeless India	English	Producer: Zafar Hai; Director: Zafar Hai	₹ 10,000/- Each
Best Promotional Film	Citation: For taking the viewer through a visually beautiful experience of the landmass called India, in all its varied colours and variety.			
Best Agricultural Film	Building From Below	English	Producer: N. G. Hegde; Director: Vishram Revankar	₹ 10,000/- Each
Best Agricultural Film	Citation: For demonstrating the prime importance of human development along with basic agricultural development activities.			
Best Film on Social Issues	The Women Betrayed	English	Producer: Sehjo Singh and Anwar Jamal; Director: Sehjo Singh	₹ 10,000/- Each
Best Film on Social Issues	Citation: For the critical presentation of the phenomenon of witches and witch-hunting, provoked by forces within and outside, which is symbolic of the exploitation of a tribal community.			
Best Educational / Motivational / Instructional Film	AIDS	Malayalam	Producer: Nooranad Ramachandran, Ganesh Babu and Ochira Sathar; Director: Nooranad Ramachandran	₹ 10,000/- Each
Best Educational / Motivational / Instructional Film	Citation: For presenting information on this disease in a simple, straightforward and direct manner.			
Best Exploration / Adventure Film	The Splendour of Garhwal and Roopkund	English	Producer: The Garhwal Mandal Vikas Nigam; Director: Victor Banerjee	₹ 10,000/- Each
Best Exploration / Adventure Film	Citation: For an imaginatively told and poetically picturised exploration of Garhwal and Roopkund.			
Best Investigative Film	Benefit For Whom at Whose Cost?	English	Producer: Dinesh Lakhanpal; Director: Dinesh Lakhanpal	₹ 10,000/- Each
Best Investigative Film	Citation: For a well researched and detailed investigation of the fears and tribulations of the people living under the looming shadow of a long-delayed multipurpose hydel project.			
Best Animation Film	Chetak	Hindi	Producer: National Center of Films for Children and Young People; Director: V. G. Samant; Animator: V. G. Samant	₹ 10,000/- Each
Best Animation Film	Citation: For bringing alive the legendary horse in a most charming manner.			
Best Short Fiction Film	Sunday	Hindi	Producer: National Center of Films for Children and Young People; Director: Pankaj Advani	₹ 10,000/- Each
Best Short Fiction Film	Citation: For taking a total holiday from logic and inhibitions and creating a most entertaining and humorous fantasy which, with all its improbabilities, will succeed in casting a spell on its audiences.			
Best Film on Family Welfare	Taveez	Hindi	Producer: Rajeev Mohan for Films Division; Director: Purushottam Berde for Films Division	₹ 10,000/- Each
Best Film on Family Welfare	Citation: For promoting the small family norm in a direct and effective manner.			
Best Cinematography	Moksha	Bengali	Cameraman: Piyush Shah	₹ 10,000/-
Best Cinematography	Citation: For documenting a tragic reality with all its moods and emotions.			
Best Audiography	Maihar Raag	Bengali	Indrajit Neogi	₹ 10,000/-
Best Audiography	Citation: For extremely imaginative and conceptual use of location sounds to depict the crumbling heritage of the Maihar orchestra.			
Best Editing	Colors of Absence	English	Rajesh Parmar	₹ 10,000/-
Best Editing	Citation: For smooth, precise and excellently edited work, which gives the film its unique rhythm, in keeping with its form and content.			
Best Music Direction	Sunday	Hindi	Rajat Dholakia	₹ 10,000/-
Best Music Direction	Citation: For contributing significantly to the mood of fantasy which pervades the film through refreshing music, with innovative use of the human voice.			
Special Jury Award	Tragedy of an Indian Farmer	English	Murali Nair (Director)	₹ 10,000/-
Special Jury Award	Citation: For transcreating a well-known and touching Malayalam poem into a celluloid poem, with great sensitivity and economy.			₹ 10,000/-
Special Jury Award	Death of a Prodigal Son	Hindi, English	Mahesh Thottathil (Director)	₹ 10,000/-
Special Jury Award	Citation: For an interesting exploration of the stream-of-consciousness of a dying man in a restrained and stylised student film.			₹ 10,000/-

=== Best Writing on Cinema ===
The awards aim at encouraging study and appreciation of cinema as an art form and dissemination of information and critical appreciation of this art-form through publication of books, articles, reviews etc.

==== Juries ====
A committee headed by Khalid Mohamed was appointed to evaluate the writing on Indian cinema. Following were the jury members:

- Jury Members
  - Khalid Mohamed (Chairperson) • Udaya Tara Nayar • Uma Vasudev

==== Golden Lotus Award ====
Official Name: Swarna Kamal

All the awardees are awarded with 'Golden Lotus Award (Swarna Kamal)' and cash prize.

Name of Award	Name of Book	Language	Awardee(s)	Cash prize
Best Book on Cinema	Naalo Nenu	Telugu	Author: Bhanumathi Ramakrishna; Publisher: K. N. T. Sastry	₹ 15,000/- Each
Best Book on Cinema	Citation: Her riveting autobiography provides an insight into the working of the Telugu film industry, while tracing her fascinating life and career, written with candour and in an immensely fluent style, the book undergoes the independent spirit of a woman in an excessively male dominated system of the show business. The lively and self-analytical work is a rare phenomenon in a field, where artistes seem to be unnecessarily hesitant to author their life stories			
Best Film Critic		Bengali	Pritiman Sarkar	₹ 15,000/-
Best Film Critic	Citation: His articles are fine example of serious film criticism. Scholarly and sensitive to minute details of films, he has distilled years of his experience as a film society enthusiast into his writing. The jury was impressed by his insights and his love for cinema as an art form			

=== Awards not given ===
Following were the awards not given as no film was found to be suitable for the award:

- Best Non-Feature Film Direction
- Best Scientific Film
- Best Historical Reconstruction / Compilation Film
