= Pallavi Joshi =

Indian actress (born 1969)

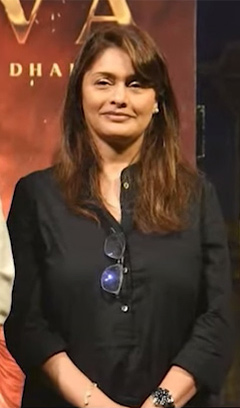
- Joshi in 2023
- Born: 4 April 1969 (age 57); Mumbai, Maharashtra, India
- Occupations: Actress; Producer; Host
- Spouse: Vivek Agnihotri (m. 1997)
- Children: 2
- Relatives: Alankar Joshi (brother)

Pallavi Joshi (born 4 April 1969) is an Indian actress, screenwriter, and film producer who works primarily in Hindi films and television. In a career spanning across films and television, Joshi is the recipient of such accolades as three National Film Awards, and a nomination for the Filmfare Awards.

Born in Mumbai to Marathi parents who were stage actors, Joshi made her acting debut at age four with a minor role in the Hindi film Naag Mere Sathi (1973). Following numerous film appearances as a child artist, Joshi garnered recognition and acclaim when she ventured into the parallel cinema movement, with roles in critically acclaimed films like; Bhujangayyana Dashavathara (1988), Rihaee (1988), Rukmavati Ki Haveli (1991), and Woh Chokri (1992), for which she won the National Film Award – Special Jury Award (Feature Film). Joshi also appeared in several commercial films, including Insaaf Ki Awaaz (1986), Andha Yudh (1987), which earned her a nomination for the Filmfare Award for Best Supporting Actress, Mujrim (1989), Saudagar (1991), Panaah (1992).

Joshi's career further expanded with her venture into television, garnering praise and popularity for revered Doordarshan shows as; Talaash (1992), Aarohan (1996–1997), Alpviram (1998), Justujoo (2002–2004). In recent years, Joshi has mainly collaborated with her husband, director Vivek Agnihotri, most notably for the films; The Tashkent Files (2019), and The Kashmir Files (2022), both of which she has produced and won her two National Film Awards for Best Supporting Actress.

She is one of the members of India's Central Board of Film Certification.

== Career ==
=== Films, critical acclaim and accolades ===
Joshi started performing on stage at an early age. She acted in films like Badla (1976) and Aadmi Sadak Ka (1977) as a child artist. She played a blind child who reforms a notorious gangster in Dada (1979). In the 1980s and early 1990s she acted in art films like Rukmavati Ki Haveli (1991), Suraj Ka Satvan Ghoda (1992), Trishagni (1988), Vanchit, Bhujangayyana Dashavathara (1991) and Rihaee (1988). She has also played supporting role in films including Saudagar, Panaah, Tehelka and Mujrim. Her performance as a disabled girl in Andha Yudh (1988) earned her a nomination for the Filmfare Award for Best Supporting Actress. She won the National Film Award – Special Jury Award (Feature Film) for Woh Chokri (1992). She also appeared as Kasturba Gandhi in Shyam Benegal's The Making of the Mahatma, (1995).

Joshi has also worked in regional films, She has played the central character 'Shantha' in the critically acclaimed Malayalam movie Ilayum Mullum (1994), directed by K. P. Sasi and a pivotal role in the Kannada film Bhujangayyana Dashavathara (1991) enacted and directed by Lokesh. She has also played a lead role in Rita, a Marathi film directed by Renuka Shahane.

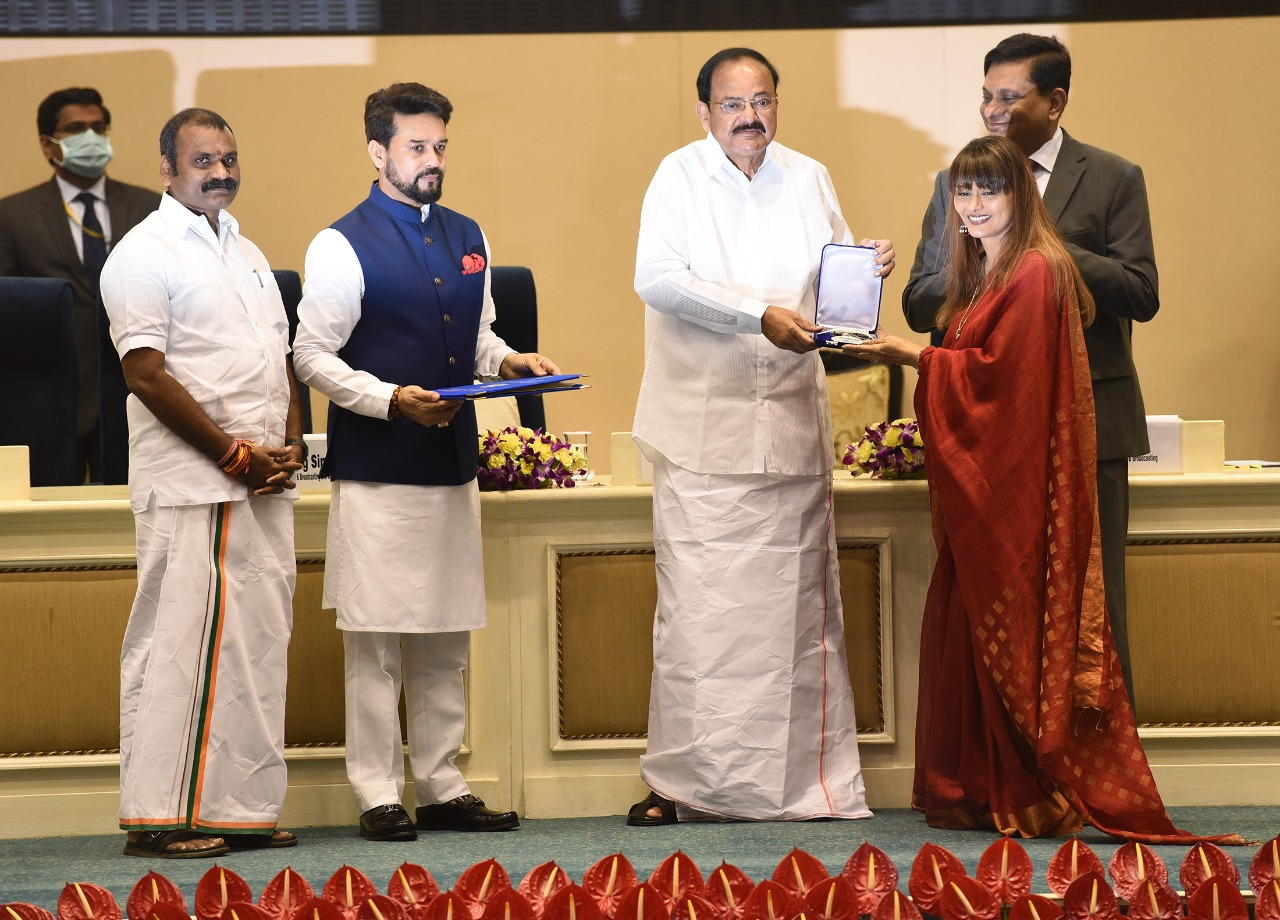
Joshi at the 67th National Film Awards ceremony in New Delhi on 25 October 2021

She is also the recipient of the Excellence In Cinema Award at the 7th Global Film Festival, Noida. She has produced and starred in her husband, director Vivek Agnihotri's directorials, The Tashkent Files (2019) and The Kashmir Files (2022), winning two National Film Awards for Best Supporting Actress for her performances in the films. Joshi was nominated as a member of Film and Television Institute of India society, but she refused to take up the position in view of the students' protest against appointment of actor and BJP member Gajendra Chauhan as the chief of the institute's governing council, But as of 2024, she is serving as the Vice-President of FTII, Pune where Ranganathan Madhavan is the President.

She will next appear in The Delhi Files.

=== Television, hosting and other work ===
Joshi's most significant hosting stint was anchoring for popular music show Zee Antakshari for 5 years. Joshi also hosted a televised singing reality show Sa Re Ga Ma Pa Marathi Li'l Champs on Zee Marathi. She also acted in some episodes of Rishtey, aired on Zee TV during 1999 and 2001. Her TV appearances include Mr. Yogi, Bharat Ek Khoj, Justujoo, Alpviram, Mriganayani, Talash and Imtihaan and her most famous Doordarshan serial has been Aarohan, a youth serial based on the navy. Justujoo was a weekly serial on Zee TV in 2002, which also starred Harsh Chhaya and Arpita Pandey. Joshi is also a producer of Marathi serials and has produced serials including Asambhav and Anubandh on Zee Marathi.

== Personal life ==
Joshi was born on 4 April 1969. She married Indian film maker Vivek Agnihotri in 1997 and has two children. She is the sister of child actor Master Alankar (Joshi).

== Filmography ==
Key
†	Denotes films that have not yet been released

=== Films ===
Year	Film	Role	Language	Notes
1973	Naag Mere Sathi		Hindi	Child artist
1976	Badla	Pallavi	Marathi	Child artist
1976	Khamma Mara Veera	Asha	Gujarati	Child artist
1976	Rakshabandhan		Hindi	Child artist
1977	Aadmi Sadak Ka	Pinky	Hindi	Child artist
1977	Daku Aur Mahatma	Vandana	Hindi	Child artist
1977	Maa Dikri		Gujarati	Child artist
1977	Dream Girl	Pallavi	Hindi	Child artist
1978	Ankh Ka Tara	Makhan	Hindi	Child artist
1978	Chor Ki Dadhi Main Tinka		Hindi	Child artist
1978	Dost Asaava Tar Asa	Pinky	Marathi	Child artist
1978	Chhota Baap		Hindi	Child artist
1978	Madi Na Jaaya		Gujarati	Child artist
1979	Dada	Munni	Hindi	Child artist
1979	Parakh		Gujarati	Child artist
1980	Allakh Na Otle		Gujarati	Child artist
1980	Mohabbat		Hindi	Child artist
1981	Khoon Ki Takkar		Hindi	Child artist
1984	Hum Bachhey Hindustan Ke		Hindi	Child artist
1985	Dikri Chhali Sasariye		Gujarati	
1985	Vanchit		Gujarati	
1986	Amrit	Sunita Saxena	Hindi	
1986	Kab Tak Pukaroon		Hindi	
1986	Insaaf Ki Awaaz	Jyoti Azaad	Hindi	
1986	Ek Kahaani		Hindi	
1987	Susman	Chinna	Hindi	
1987	Theertham	Sreedevi	Malayalam	
1987	Buniyaad	Ranno	Hindi	
1988	Andha Yudh	Saroj	Hindi	
1988	Agent 777		Hindi	
1988	Subah Hone Tak		Hindi	
1988	Rihaee		Hindi	Special appearance
1988	Zanjeeren		Hindi	
1988	Trishagni	Iti	Hindi	
1989	Guru Dakshina		Hindi	
1989	Beauty Queen		Hindi	
1989	Daata	Shanti	Hindi	
1989	Mujrim	Sunanda Bose	Hindi	
1990	Vanchit		Hindi	
1990	Kroadh	Salma A. Khan	Hindi	
1991	Bhujangayyana Dashavathara		Kannada	
1991	Jhoothi Shaan	Kaveri	Hindi	
1991	Rukmavati Ki Haveli	Padma	Hindi	
1991	Saudagar	Amla	Hindi	
1992	Mangni		Hindi	
1992	Priya		Bengali	
1992	Panaah	Mamta	Hindi	
1992	Tahalka	Julie	Hindi	
1992	Suraj Ka Satvan Ghoda	Lily	Hindi	
1993	Meri Pyari Nimmo		Hindi	
1994	Ilayum Mullum	Santha	Malayalam	
1994	Insaniyat	Munni	Hindi	
1994	Woh Chokri	Afsara / Dulari / Tunni	Hindi	National Film Award - Special Jury Award
1995	Daughters of This Century		Hindi	
1996	The Making of the Mahatma	Kasturba Gandhi	Hindi	
1999	Chocolate		Hindi	Television film
2009	Rita	Rita	Marathi	Nominated - MFK Award for Favourite Actress
2013	Prem Mhanje Prem Mhanje Prem Asta		Marathi	
2016	Buddha in a Traffic Jam	Sheetal Batki	Hindi	
2019	The Tashkent Files	Aiysha Ali Shah	Hindi	National Film Award for Best Supporting Actress
2022	The Kashmir Files	Professor Radhika Menon	Hindi	National Film Award for Best Supporting Actress
2023	The Vaccine War	Dr. Priya Abraham	Hindi	
2025	Tanvi The Great	Vidya Raina	Hindi	
2025	The Bengal Files	Maa Bharti / Aged Bharti Banerjee	Hindi	

=== OTT / Web series ===
Year	Title	Language	Platform	Notes
2023	Kashmir Files Unreported	Hindi	ZEE5	Also producer
2023	Kashmir Files Unreported	English	ZEE5	Also producer

=== Television ===
Year	Show	Role	Language	Ref.
1985	Ek Kahani - Jungli Booti		HIndi	
1986	Katha Sagar		HIndi	
1988-1989	Bharat Ek Khoj	Ratna; Kannaki; Seeta; Mallika; Shakuntala; Atri; Mallige	HIndi	
1989	Mr. Yogi	Bride	Marathi	
1991	Mrignayanee		Hindi	
1991	Jeevan Mrityu		Hindi	
1992	Talaash	Junglee	Hindi	
1993	Zee Horror Show		Hindi	
1993-1994	Adalat		Hindi	
1996	Imtihaan		Hindi	
1996-1997	Aarohan	Cadet Nikita Sachdev	Hindi	
1996	Yeh Kahan Aa Gaye Hum		Hindi	
1996–1999; 2002–2004	Antakshari	Host	Hindi	
1998	Alpviram	Amrita	Hindi	
2001	Hamare Tumhare	Ruchika	Hindi	
2002	Justujoo	Leela Sharma	Hindi	
2004	Kkehna Hai Kuch Mujhko	Reva Kapoor	Hindi	
2006-2007	Sa re Ga Ma Pa		Hindi	
2007-2009	Asambhav		Marathi	
2009-2010	Anubandh		Marathi	
2010-2011	Gaurav Maharashtracha		Marathi	
2015-16	Meri Awaaz Hi Pehchaan Hai	Devika Gaikwad "Aai", Kalyani and Ketaki's mother	Hindi	
2017	Peshwa Bajirao	Tarabai	Hindi	
2018	Grahan	Rama Podar/ Vasudha Nevrekar/ Chandni Sharanpani	Marathi	

== Awards and nominations ==
Year	Award	Category	Film	Result	Ref.
1989	Filmfare Awards	Best Supporting Actress	Andha Yudh	Nominated	
1994	National Film Awards	Special Jury Award (Feature Film)	Woh Chokri	Won	
2021	National Film Awards	Best Supporting Actress	The Tashkent Files	Won	
2023	National Film Awards	Best Supporting Actress	The Kashmir Files	Won	
