= Khoon Bhari Maang =

- Theatrical release poster
- Directed by: Rakesh Roshan
- Written by: Mohan Kaul; Ravi Kapoor
- Produced by: Rakesh Roshan
- Starring: Rekha; Kabir Bedi; Sonu Walia; Shatrughan Sinha; Kader Khan
- Cinematography: Pushpal Dutta
- Edited by: Sanjay Verma
- Music by: Rajesh Roshan
- Distributed by: Filmkraft Productions
- Release date: 12 August 1988
- Running time: 146 minutes
- Country: India
- Language: Hindi
- Box office: ₹6 crore

Khoon Bhari Maang (transl. Hairline full of blood ) is a 1988 Indian Hindi-language action thriller film directed and produced by Rakesh Roshan. Based on the Australian mini-series Return to Eden (1983), it stars Rekha as a wealthy widow who is almost killed by her second husband and sets out for revenge. The film was a comeback venture for Rekha, and was a critical and commercial success. It received seven nominations at the 34th Filmfare Awards, including for Best Film and Best Director for Roshan, and won Rekha her second Best Actress award. Khoon Bhari Maang was released on 12 August 1988.

== Synopsis ==
Aarti Devi Saxena is a widow with two children– Kavita and Bobby. She is considered ‘unattractive’ due to a large birthmark on her face. Her husband Vikram died in a car accident under mysterious circumstances, and her father is one of the richest and most famous businessmen in the city. When her father is suddenly murdered by his worker Hiralal, Aarti loses all sense of purpose in life, except bringing up her children. Hiralal pretends to be a friend, and takes care of her like a father. He brings his poor nephew Sanjay Verma from abroad, who is romantically involved with Aarti's best friend Nandini. Although Nandini is fond of Aarti, she is intensely in love with Sanjay, and agrees to help him rob Aarti of her wealth. Slowly, Sanjay gets close to Aarti's children. Nandini and the rest of the family convince Aarti to marry Sanjay. The day after the wedding, Aarti, Sanjay, and Nandini go on a short trip, during which, Sanjay pushes Aarti from a rowboat into crocodile infested waters hoping that she would die. The crocodile mauls Aarti and mutilates her body and face. However, Aarti's body is not found; since Sanjay cannot inherit her wealth until death is established beyond any reasonable doubt, he becomes abusive to Aarti’s children and pets. Meanwhile, Aarti is rescued by an old farmer who nurses her back to health.

A few months later, the horribly disfigured Aarti decides to return to the city, and avenge herself and her family. She exchanges her expensive diamond earrings for a huge amount of money and pays for extensive plastic surgery. She transforms into a ‘beautiful’ woman, very different from her earlier self, and decides to go after Nandini, who is now a successful model. In order to challenge her popularity, Aarti approaches the same modelling agency (Kraft advertising agency) that represents Nandini and introduces herself as Jyoti. The photographer JD spots her beauty and vows to make her the topmost model in town, even more successful than Nandini. Soon Jyoti's popularity takes over Nandini's, and out of frustration, she challenges Jyoti for a dance performance in which she loses. Nandini soon becomes jobless, and Jyoti's first target gets settled. Meanwhile, Sanjay gets smitten by Jyoti's beauty and is no longer interested in Nandini. He tries various ways to woo her and seduce her but fails every time. Later, Jyoti finds out that her children have stopped going to school. Jyoti lures in Sanjay to invite her to her own home, where she lived with her pets and children. Although the pets recognise Jyoti as Aarti, the children fail to do so. Jyoti finds out about all misdeeds of Sanjay and Hiralal through the children, including the murder of Ramu Kaka, the servant and her father.

JD gets suspicious about Jyoti's actions and shows his concern for her. He offers help as a friend, which Jyoti declines. JD ultimately finds out that Jyoti is none other than Aarti, who has come back to exact revenge on her wrong doers. Meanwhile, Jyoti sets eyes on her second target, Hiralal. She sneaks into his house at midnight and kills him. She then calls Nandini and tells her that she is taking Sanjay with her to Sitapur farm (the same place where Aarti was attacked). JD asks Aarti's children about Jyoti's whereabouts as her life is in danger. He reveals to them the fact about Jyoti being their mother. Sanjay brings Jyoti to the farmhouse. Nandini also reaches there and confronts Sanjay. She threatens to expose him to Jyoti and will not let her suffer like Aarti. Jyoti confronts them both and finally reveals herself as Aarti. Aarti vows to take revenge on Sanjay in a similar fashion to the way he tried to kill her. Aarti fights Sanjay, and in the process, Nandini sacrifices herself to save Aarti. Aarti, with the help of her pet horse Raja, drags Sanjay to the same spot with crocodile-infested waters. Aarti tries her best to knock Sanjay off the cliff, but Sanjay turns around and pushes her down.

JD reaches the spot, saves Aarti, and fights Sanjay. After a brief fight, he knocks Sanjay out who rolls down the cliff, hanging upside down. He asks Aarti for forgiveness. Aarti recalls that horrific incident when she was pushed into the lake and brutally attacked by the crocodile. Aarti hits Sanjay one last time with a wooden rod, and he falls down the cliff and gets devoured by a crocodile. Aarti reunites with her family and pets.

== Cast ==
- Rekha as Aarti Devi Saxena alias Jyoti Shah: Vikram's widow; Kavita and Bobby's mother
- Kabir Bedi as Sanjay Verma: Aarti's second husband; Nandini's boyfriend
- Sonu Walia as Nandini: Aarti's best-friend who betrays her for her boyfriend Sanjay
- Kader Khan as Heeralal: Sanjay's uncle; Aarti's wicked employee
- Mangal Dhillon as Aarti's family advocate
- Satyajeet as Baliya: Aarti's mute servant
- Sulochana Latkar as J.D.'s mother
- Sulabha Deshpande as Leela: Aarti's mother figure servant
- Paidi Jairaj as Baba: Aarti's saviour from crocodile
- Tom Alter as Aarti's Plastic Surgeon
- A. K. Hangal as Ramu Kaka: Aarti's father figure servant
- Shweta Rastogi as Kavita: Aarti and Vikram's daughter (credited as Baby Swetha)
- Master Gaurav as Bobby: Aarti and Vikram's son
- Vikas Anand as Manager of Aarti's industries
- Farita Boyce as J.D.'s assistant
- Baby Shraddha as J.D.'s niece and Kavita's classmate
- Master Kaushal as J.D.'s nephew
- Irshad Hashmi as Feroz Bhai Sodawala: Shirin's compounder and fiancé
- Jumbo as Aarti's Dog
- Raja as Aarti's horse

=== Special appearance ===
- Shatrughan Sinha as J.D: Kraft Advertising Agency's photographer; Jyoti's friend
- Rakesh Roshan as Vikram: Aarti's late husband; Kavita and Bobby's father
- Saeed Jaffrey as Shyam Sunder Saxena: Aarti's father
- Shubha Khote as Dr. Shirin Ben Nalkhol Daruwala: The Veterinarian and Feroz's fianceé

== Production ==
Khoon Bhari Maang was announced by Rakesh Roshan in January 1988, with the media reporting Rekha would star as the film's lead.

== Music ==
The film has four songs composed by Rajesh Roshan:

- "Hanste Hanste Kat Jayen Raste" - Nitin Mukesh, Sadhana Sargam
- "Jeene Ke Bahane Lakhon Hain" - Asha Bhosle
- "Main Haseena Ghazab Ki" - Asha Bhosle, Sadhana Sargam
- "Main Teri Hoon Janam" - Sadhana Sargam
- "Hanste Hanste Kat Jayen Raste" - Sadhana Sargam, Sonali

The tune of the song "Main Teri Hoon Jaanam" is inspired from the theme song of the British film Chariots of Fire.

== Reception ==
Reviews towards Khoon Bhari Maang were positive, with most of the critics' praise being directed towards Rekha's performance. In a 2000 article reviewing the last two decades in Hindi cinema, Bhawana Somaaya from The Hindu wrote: "Rakesh Roshan offers Rekha the role of a lifetime in Khoon Bhari Maang." M.L. Dhawan from The Tribune, while documenting the famous Hindi films of 1988, argued: "With Khoon Bhari Maang, Rakesh Roshan destroyed the myth that it was essential to have a hero as the protagonist and that heroines were there just to serve as interludes and mannequins."

Dhawan further noted: "This fast-paced movie was a crowning glory for Rekha, who rose like a phoenix in this remake of Return to Eden, and bedazzled the audience with her daredevilry." It was an unofficial remake of Return to Eden, the original mini series, not the 1985 sequel series.

== Remakes ==
Year	Title	Language	Leading actress	Note	Ref.
1987	Gouthami	Telugu	Suhasini		
1989	Thendral Sudum	Tamil	Radhika		
1993	Jwala	Kannada	Mohini		
1997	Nari Bi Pindhipare Rakta Sindura	Odia	Rachna Banerjee		

== Awards ==
34th Filmfare Awards:

Won

- Best Actress – Rekha
- Best Supporting Actress – Sonu Walia
- Best Editing – Sanjay Verma

Nominated

- Best Film – Rakesh Roshan
- Best Director – Rakesh Roshan
- Best Music Director – Rajesh Roshan
- Best Female Playback Singer – Sadhana Sargam for "Main Teri Hoon Jaanam"
