= Alpviram =

- Screenplay by: Aatish Kapadia; Vipul Shah
- Directed by: Vipul Shah
- Composer: Uttank Vora
- Original language: Hindi
- No. of episodes: 90

Production
- Producer: Shobhana Desai
- Cinematography: Indrajeet Bansal; Deepak Malbankar
- Editor: Tapas Ghosh

Original release
- Release: 1998 – 1998

Alpviram (translation: Comma, half pause) is a drama television series that aired on Sony Entertainment Television in India in 1998. Produced by Shobhana Desai, the show was directed by veteran director Vipul Shah and starred Pallavi Joshi and Amir Bashir.

== Plot summary ==
The show, set in the city of Pune, revolves around the story of Amrita, a 21-year old vivacious girl who lives with her loving grandparents and has been dating Rohit Bakshi, a young boy from the well to do Bakshi family. On her 21st birthday, Amrita and Rohit's families plan a surprise outing for her where Rohit and Amrita get formally engaged to each other. But moments later, Amrita becomes unconscious and is rushed to the hospital where she ends up in a coma. Dr. Gupta explains that Amrita has brain aneurysms and would remain in a coma for an unspecified period of time.

Amrita's grandparents and Rohit are shattered but start taking care of Amrita. One day they realise she is pregnant and has been raped by someone at the hospital. Already reeling from financial troubles after spending their savings on her treatment, her grandparents decide to fight for justice against the hospital and its adamant administrator, Mr. Munshi, till they can find the culprit. A police investigation ensues in which everyone at the hospital is a suspect including, briefly, even Rohit. Meanwhile, the resulting scandal forces Rohit's family to ask him to choose between them and Amrita as he decides to stand by her.

Over time, as Amrita remains in a coma, Rohit eventually becomes engaged to another girl. Finally, when Amrita awakens from the coma, she must face her changed circumstances and make some tough decisions about her pregnancy, her relationship with Rohit, and her feelings towards her rapist as she attempts to comprehend her situation.

== Cast ==
- Pallavi Joshi as Amrita Bajaj
- Aamir Bashir as Rohit Bakshi
- Smita Bansal as Shweta Bhatnagar, a Journalist
- Anjan Srivastav as Mr. Bajaj, Amrita's grandfather
- Sulabha Deshpande as Subhadra Bajaj, Amrita's grandmother
- Vikram Gokhale as Mr. Munshi, Hospital Administrator
- Rajendra Gupta as Dr. Pradeep Gupta, Amrita's doctor
- Mohan Gokhale as Raju, a ward boy at the Hospital
- Arun Bali as Dr. Mathur, Dean of the Hospital
- Parikshit Sahni as Mr. Bakshi, Rohit's father
- Lalan Sarang as Mrs. Bakshi, Rohit's mother
- Rasik Dave as Amit Bakshi, Rohit's elder brother
- Apara Mehta as Sunita Amit Bakshi, Amit's wife
- Sejal Shah as Madhavi Bakshi, Amit and Rohit's sister

== Reception ==
The show received positive reviews and years later is still considered to be a show that was ahead of its times in addressing issues of hospital malpractice, experiences of a rape survivor and Indian society's attitude towards women. It has been praised for the maturity with which it portrayed a rape survivor and her struggle.
