= Aarohan =

1996 TV Serial

- Written by: Pallavi Joshi
- Directed by: Nandu Ghanekar
- Composer: Sanjoy Chowdhury
- Country of origin: India
- Original language: Hindi
- No. of seasons: 1
- No. of episodes: 13

Production
- Executive producer: Madhusudan Joshi
- Producer: Pallavi Joshi

Original release
- Network: DD National
- Release: 1995 – 1996

Aarohan is an Indian TV series that aired on DD National from 1996 to 1997. The show was written and produced by Pallavi Joshi, who also played the character of protagonist Nikita Sachdev.

== Overview ==
Aarohan takes place in a make-believe scenario about women cadets joining Indian Navy (as women could not join combat force in Indian Navy then). It followed their lives and their training in the Naval Academy. The 13-episode series ended with a climax where cadets dealt with a war-like scenario.

The show's lead is a headstrong, passionate defence forces girl, Nikita. Her father (Satyen Kappu) and brother (Amit Behl) are in the Indian Army. She has a shy friend (Shefali Shah), who joins the academy with her.

== Cast ==
- Pallavi Joshi as Cadet Nikita Sachdev
- Shefali Shah as Cadet Nivedita Sen
- Tarun Dhanrajgir as Lt. Commander Siddharth Khurana
- Anju Mahendru as Commander Kashmira Khurana
- Parveen Dastur as Cadet Vinita Krishnamurti
- Harsh Chhaya as Lt. Rohit Sharma
- Girish Malik as Sahil Khurana
- Amit Behl as Flying Officer Nikhil Sachdev
- Arun Bali as Rear Admiral Karan Khurana
- Manisha Kanoujia as ila
- R. Madhavan as Lt. Shammi
- Satyen Kappu as Colonel Arun Sachdev
- Kashmera Shah as Lata (Special Appearance only in Episode 11)
