= Qayamat Se Qayamat Tak =

1988 Indian film by Mansoor Khan

- Theatrical release poster
- Directed by: Mansoor Khan
- Written by: Nasir Hussain
- Produced by: Nasir Hussain
- Starring: Aamir Khan; Juhi Chawla
- Cinematography: Kiran Deohans
- Edited by: Zafar Sultan
- Music by: Anand–Milind
- Production company: Nasir Hussain Films
- Release date: 29 April 1988
- Running time: 163 mins
- Country: India
- Language: Hindi
- Box office: ₹50 million (net)

Qayamat Se Qayamat Tak (transl. From doomsday to doomsday), (Note: Qayamat is the term for the Islamic concept of Day of Resurrection) is a 1988 Indian Hindi-language romantic musical film directed by Mansoor Khan in his directorial debut, and written and produced by Nasir Hussain. The film stars debutant Aamir Khan and Juhi Chawla in lead roles. The film features music by Anand–Milind, with lyrics written by Majrooh Sultanpuri. Qayamat Se Qayamat Tak tells the story of two individuals and recounts their journey of falling in love, eloping, and the aftermath. It is considered a cult film and is one of the most successful films of all time.

The film was released on 29 April 1988. Made on a budget of ₹25 million, the film emerged as a commercial success, with a worldwide gross of ₹50 million, and became the third highest-grossing film of the year. The film received positive remarks from critics. The soundtrack of the film was equally successful, becoming one of the best-selling Hindi soundtrack albums of the 1980s with more than 8 million soundtrack albums sold, thus being a breakthrough for the careers of Anand–Milind, as well as T-Series, one of India's leading record labels. The film's music also established the careers of Udit Narayan and Alka Yagnik. With basic story it was remarked in Telugu as "Akkada ammaayi ikkada Abbaayi" in 1996 with Pawan Kalyan's Debut Movie.

At the 36th National Film Awards, Qayamat Se Qayamat Tak won the Best Popular Film Providing Wholesome Entertainment. At the 34th Filmfare Awards, the film received eleven nominations, and won a leading eight awards, including Best Film, Best Director. Khan and Chawla's performance in the film earned them Best Male Debut and Best Female Debut respectively. The film is widely considered to be a milestone for its genre, earning praise from critics for its direction, the story and music. The plot of the film was a modern-day take on classic tragic romance which "reinvented the romantic musical genre", setting the template for Hindi musical romance films that defined Hindi cinema in the 1990s. Considered as a cult classic, Indiatimes Movies ranks the film amongst the "Top 25 Must See Bollywood Films".

== Plot ==
Brothers Thakur Jaswant and Dhanraj Singh are farmers in the village of Dhanakpur. Their younger sister Madhumati (Madhu) was impregnated and then abandoned by Ratan, the younger son of Thakur Raghuvir Singh, the head of a wealthy Rajput family. The family refuses to allow Madhu to marry Ratan, who is engaged to another girl, after he denies the claims made by Jaswant. However, his mother later tells Raghuvir that she secretly heard Madhu tell Ratan about his paternity some time earlier outside their house and begs him to agree to their marriage. He immediately refuses, stating that an unmarried pregnant girl would ruin their family's reputation by becoming their daughter-in-law.

Jaswant leaves the village to sell the family farm and see if they can move to Delhi, where their other sister Parvati lives with her husband Bhagwandas and son Shyam. He realizes the humiliation and shame their family will face because Madhu's lover is marrying someone else, especially after he impregnated her. Saddened by the loss of her lover and the dishonor it will bring to her family, Madhu commits suicide. Frustrated, Dhanraj brings her body to Ratan's wedding and kills him. He is jailed, and the two families become enemies. Jaswant moves to Parvati's Delhi home with Dhanraj's wife Saroj and son Raj. He runs a clothing business with Bhagwandas and also helps raise Raj.

Fourteen years later, Dhanraj is released from prison and receives a letter from his son Raj, an ardent music lover who has completed his education at Rajput College. He sneaks into Raj's college farewell party and is glad to see him fulfilling his dreams. After the party, Raj and his cousin Shyam, who also graduated from there, reunite with him and bring him home, where he has an emotional reunion with the rest of the family. Raj, Shyam, and Dhanraj then join Bhagwandas and Jaswant in their business, furthering their success.

In a twist of fate, Raj goes to Dhanakpur with Shyam to file a business case against Raghuvir's elder son Thakur Randhir Singh. While returning home, he is attracted to Randhir's beautiful daughter Rashmi. He sneaks with a reluctant Shyam into her birthday party that night to see her. He poses as Roop Singh, Randhir's friend Thakur Pratap Singh's son whom he wants her to marry. Raj reluctantly meets with Randhir after he becomes happy to "see" him after long. When the real Roop Singh arrives, Randhir refuses to believe it and that's when Raj and Shyam flee much to Randhir's anger. He then finds out from his manager, he was Dhanraj's son who came to file a business case against him and tells his mother and Rashmi which shocks them.

Raj and Rashmi meet again at a holiday spot and fall in love. Raj learns about her family but is unable to tell her the truth. After they share a meal with Shyam, Dhanraj, and Saroj, Rashmi reveals to Dhanraj that she is the daughter of Thakur Randhir Singh and is from Dhanakpur. Frustrated, he confesses that he is the one who killed her uncle Ratan. Saddened, she and Raj exchange an emotional goodbye after he admits that he tried to forget her after learning her identity long ago but couldn't because he is madly in love with her, which shocks her. Back in Delhi, they continue to meet in secret, even after Raj reluctantly promises his family he will forget her when they confront him about loving an enemy. Randhir discovers their relationship after seeing them together at her college and overhearing a phone call at their house one day. He then arranges her wedding to Roop Singh and warns Jaswant, Saroj, and Parvati at their house that he will kill Raj if he tries to see her again. Jaswant confronts Raj about the situation and agrees not to tell Dhanraj anything after Raj lies, claiming he met Rashmi only to end their love. After Randhir beats him up and throws him out of their house when he warns him, Raj and his father realize they cannot separate the two lovers no matter what. At Rashmi's engagement to Roop Singh, Raj is heartbroken and cries in his father's arms out of shame for loving their enemy. However, with the help of her friend Kavita, Rashmi leaves home, and with Shyam's assistance, Raj prepares to elope with her.

Raj and Rashmi take on their families and elope, dreaming of an idyllic life together. They stay in a deserted fort, happy in their own paradise. Furious, Randhir posts Raj's picture in the newspapers offering a huge reward if he is found but doesn't share Rashmi's name thinking of the bad name their family will get. Dhanraj warns him that he'll reluctantly be the killer he was before if he harms Raj after seeing his picture. When Randhir learns their whereabouts, he, his brother-in-law and his nephew Balwant hire killers to kill Raj. Overhearing this, his mother then goes to Raj's house and begs his family to save the lovebirds. Raj leaves to bring firewood for their house. Randhir arrives with his brother-in-law, Balwant and the killers. They send them to kill Raj. While Raj is away, Randhir meets Rashmi, assuring her he has "accepted their love" and came to take them home.

Rashmi is overjoyed at Randhir's words, unaware of the truth. Raj is chased by the henchmen. Dhanraj reaches the fort with Jaswant, Shyam and Randhir's mother and asks about Raj's whereabouts. Rashmi leaves to make sure Raj is okay. He is about to be shot but the henchman shoots Rashmi twice instead. She dies in Raj's arms, making him devastated and grief-stricken.

Raj commits suicide by stabbing himself, and dies beside Rashmi. The final scene is both families running toward them; the lovers are together, never to be separated, as the sun sets behind them.

== Cast ==
- Aamir Khan as Rajveer "Raj" Singh
  - Imran Khan as young Raj
- Juhi Chawla as Rashmi Singh
- Goga Kapoor as Randhir Singh: Rashmi's father
- Dalip Tahil as Dhanraj Singh: Raj's father
- Ravindra Kapoor as Dharampal Singh
- Asha Sharma as Saraswati Singh
- Alok Nath as Jaswant Singh: Raj's paternal uncle
- Rajendranath Zutshi as Shyam Prakash
- Shehnaz Kudia as Kavita Bhalotiya
- Charushila as Parvati Sharma
- Beena Banerjee as Saroj Kunder
- Reema Lagoo as Kamla Singh: Rashmi's mother
- Nandita Thakur as Indumati Devi
- Ahmed Khan as Bhagwandas Kumar
- Seema Vaz as Madhumati
- Arjun as Ratan Singh: Madhumati's ex-lover
- Ajit Vachani as Vakil Biharilal
- Yunus Parvez as Truck Driver
- Viju Khote as Maan Singh
- Arun Mathur as Raghuvir Singh: Ratan's father
- Shehzad Khan as Pathan friend Shahid Khan
- Mukesh as Pathan friend Hamid Khan
- Makrand Deshpande as Baba
- Yatin Karyekar as Baba's friend
- Faisal Khan as Baba's friend
- Shiva Rindani as Balwant Singh
- Reena Dutta in a special appearance in the song "Papa Kehte Hain"
- Brij Gopal as Killer

== Production ==
The film marked the directorial debut of Mansoor Khan, son of Nasir Hussain as well as the acting debut of Mansoor's cousin Aamir Khan. The film is a tale of unrequited love and familial opposition, with Khan portraying Raj, a "clean-cut, wholesome boy-next-door". The plot is a modern-day take on classic tragic romance stories such as Layla-Majnun, Heer-Ranjha, and Romeo-Juliet.

Mansoor recalled that his father Nasir wanted to launch Aamir as a leading actor and was convinced that Mansoor would direct the film after watching his telefilm. The film was initially titled Nafrat Ke Waaris (transl. Descendants of Hate), according to film expert Rajesh Subramanian.

Nasir initially wanted to cast Shammi Kapoor and Sanjeev Kumar as the family patriarchs, but Mansoor refused to work with them as they were 'too senior.'

For the film's marketing, Aamir was involved in promoting the film. He set up an outdoor ad campaign, which was a faceless poster that said, "Who is Aamir Khan? Ask the girl next door!". With his brother-in-law Raj Zutshi, Khan also went around putting up posters on auto-rickshaws across Mumbai.

== Music ==
Qayamat Se Qayamat Tak

Studio album by Anand–Milind and Majrooh Sultanpuri
- Released: 1988
- Genre: Feature film soundtrack
- Language: Hindi
- Label: T-Series
- Producer: Anand–Milind

Anand–Milind chronology
Shiv Shakti (1988)	Qayamat Se Qayamat Tak (1988)	Woh Phir Aayegi (1988)

Majrooh Sultanpuri chronology
Zamane Ko Dikhana Hai (1981)	Qayamat Se Qayamat Tak (1988)	Jo Jeeta Wohi Sikandar (1992)

Professional ratings
Review scores
Source	Rating
Planet Bollywood	8/10 stars

"Papa Kehte Hain"
"Papa Kehte Hain", written by Majrooh Sultanpuri, sung by Udit Narayan, and picturised on Aamir Khan.

The soundtrack contains five songs composed by the duo Anand–Milind, and songs written by veteran Majrooh Sultanpuri. All the tracks were sung by Udit Narayan, who sang for Aamir Khan, and Alka Yagnik, who sang for Juhi Chawla.

Pancham (R. D. Burman) was to compose the soundtrack, but director Mansoor Khan wanted a young music director. That's how Anand–Milind, who had worked with him earlier on this tele-film, secured this project. Mansoor selected Narayan to sing all songs because he felt that his voice would suit Aamir.

The biggest hit song from the album was "Papa Kehte Hain". Majroosh Saab (as he is fondly known) wrote the song at the age of 70. Sung by Narayan and picturised on Aamir Khan, the full title of the song is "Papa Kehte Hain Bada Naam Karega", which translates to "My dad says that I'll make him proud!".

Qayamat Se Qayamat Tak was the best-selling Bollywood music soundtrack album of 1988, outselling Tezaab, the second best-seller, which itself had sold over 8 million units. Qayamat Se Qayamat Tak became one of the best-selling Indian soundtrack albums of the 1980s. It was the first major hit album released by the record label T-Series. Prior to its release, Nasir Hussain reportedly sold the film's music rights to T-Series founder Gulshan Kumar for only ₹400,000 ($30,000).

At the 34th Filmfare Awards, Anand–Milind won the Filmfare Award for Best Music Director, Majrooh Sultanpuri was nominated for Best Lyricist for "Papa Kehte Hain", and Udit Narayan won Best Male Playback Singer for "Papa Kehte Hain".

All lyrics are written by Majrooh Sultanpuri; all music is composed by Anand–Milind.

No.	Title	Singer(s)	Length
1.	"Papa Kehte Hain"	Udit Narayan	05:55
2.	"Ae Mere Humsafar"	Udit Narayan and Alka Yagnik	05:53
3.	"Akele Hain To Kya Gum Hai"	Udit Narayan and Alka Yagnik	05:59
4.	"Gazab Ka Hai Din"	Udit Narayan and Alka Yagnik	04:26
5.	"Kahe Sataye" (Raga Pahadi)	Alka Yagnik	02:19
6.	"Papa Kehte Hain (Sad)"	Udit Narayan	04:01

=== Popular culture ===
The song "Papa Kehte Hain":

- was used in Hum Saath Saath Hain (1999) in a parody. It was rendered by the original singer Udit Narayan and re-written by Ravinder Rawal.
- was used in Dil (also starring Aamir Khan) (1990) during a college party scene.
- was used in Andaz Apna Apna (also starring Aamir Khan) (1994) in a comedy sequence.
- was recreated by Vishal–Shekhar as a short song for the 2012 film Student of the Year, which was Varun Dhawan's debut, in which he sings while performing at a concert.
- was used in the Ajay Devgn-starrer, De De Pyaar De (2019) every time Bhavin Bhanushali's character, Ishaan talks lovingly about Ayesha (played by Rakul Preet Singh), without knowing that she is his father's girlfriend (played by Devgn).
- was recreated and 6/8 version was re-sung in a 2024 movie Srikanth starring Raj Kumar Rao by original singer Udit Narayan.

The song was also a success in the Binaca Geetmala.

The song "Aye Mere Humsafar":

- was recreated by Mithoon and sung by Mithoon and Tulsi Kumar for the 2015 film All Is Well. Amitabh Verma wrote additional lyrics for this version.

The song "Gazab Ka Hai Din":

- was used in the 2015 film Masaan.
- was also recreated by Tanishk Bagchi and sung by Jubin Nautiyal & Prakriti Kakar for the 2018 film Dil Juunglee. Tanishk Bagchi wrote additional lyrics for this version.

== Box office ==
Qayamat Se Qayamat Tak became a golden jubilee hit after running for 50 weeks. It earned a domestic net collection of ₹50 million ($4 million), and was declared a blockbuster, becoming the third highest-grossing film of 1988, behind Tezaab and Shahenshah. Adjusted for inflation, the domestic net collection of Qayamat Se Qayamat Tak is equivalent to more than ₹1.4 billion (US$21.5 million) in 2017. (Note: 1993 inflation rate was 18 times: Darr's domestic nett of ₹107.3 million in 1993 is equivalent to ₹1,914.4 million in 2017.)

The film was also released in China, in 1990. It was Aamir Khan's first film released in China, two decades before he became a household name there in the 2010s after 3 Idiots (2009).

== Accolades ==
Award	Date of ceremony	Category	Recipient(s) and nominee(s)	Result	Ref(s)
Filmfare Awards	34th Filmfare Awards	Best Film	Qayamat Se Qayamat Tak	Won	
Filmfare Awards	34th Filmfare Awards	Best Director	Mansoor Khan	Won	
Filmfare Awards	34th Filmfare Awards	Best Actor	Aamir Khan	Nominated	
Filmfare Awards	34th Filmfare Awards	Best Male Debut	Aamir Khan	Won	
Filmfare Awards	34th Filmfare Awards	Best Actress	Juhi Chawla	Nominated	
Filmfare Awards	34th Filmfare Awards	Best Female Debut	Juhi Chawla	Won	
Filmfare Awards	34th Filmfare Awards	Best Music Director	Anand–Milind	Won	
Filmfare Awards	34th Filmfare Awards	Best Lyricist	Majrooh Sultanpuri for "Papa Kehte Hain"	Nominated	
Filmfare Awards	34th Filmfare Awards	Best Male Playback Singer	Udit Narayan for "Papa Kehte Hain"	Won	
Filmfare Awards	34th Filmfare Awards	Best Screenplay	Nasir Hussain	Won	
Filmfare Awards	34th Filmfare Awards	Best Cinematography	Kiran Deohans	Won	
National Film Awards	36th National Film Awards	Best Popular Film Providing Wholesome Entertainment	Qayamat Se Qayamat Tak	Won	
National Film Awards	36th National Film Awards	Special Mention	Aamir Khan (also for Raakh)	Won	

== Remakes ==
The film was remade in Telugu as Akkada Ammayi Ikkada Abbayi, which marked the debut for Pawan Kalyan. It was also remade in Bangladesh as Keyamat Theke Keyamat in 1993, marked as the debut of renowned Bangladeshi duo Salman Shah and Moushumi. It was also remade in Sinhala as Dalu lana gini starring Damith Fonseka and Dilhani Ekanayake. It was also remade in Nepali as Yug Dekhi Yug Samma, which marked the debut of Nepalese actor Rajesh Hamal.

== Legacy ==
Qayamat Se Qayamat Tak proved to be a major commercial success, catapulting both Khan and Chawla to stardom. It received 8 Filmfare Awards including a Best Male Debut for Khan and Best Female Debut award for Chawla. The film has since attained cult status. Bollywood Hungama credits it as a "path-breaking and trend-setting film" for Indian cinema.

Gautam Chintamani's book Qayamat Se Qayamat Tak: The Film That Revived Hindi Cinema (2016) credits the film with revitalizing Hindi cinema. In the late 1980s, Hindi cinema was experiencing a decline in box office turnout, due to increasing violence, decline in musical melodic quality, and rise in video piracy, leading to middle-class family audiences abandoning theaters. Qayamat Se Qayamat Tak's blend of youthfulness, wholesome entertainment, emotional quotients and strong melodies is credited with luring family audiences back to the big screen. The film is credited with having "reinvented the romantic musical genre" in Bollywood. Chintamani credits it as one of the most important films of the last three decades. It was a milestone in the history of Hindi cinema, setting the template for Bollywood musical romance films that defined Hindi cinema in the 1990s. In a 2000 survey by Indolink.com, Qayamat Se Qayamat Tak was ranked the best film of the 80's.
