= Woh Chokri =

- Based on: Chhunrita by Balai Chand Mukhopadhyay
- Written by: Atul Tiwari
- Directed by: Subhankar Ghosh
- Starring: Pallavi Joshi; Neena Gupta; Paresh Rawal; Om Puri; Yogita Chheda; Swapnil Diwan; Tushar Mohile
- Music by: Sapan Jagmohan
- Country of origin: India
- Original language: Hindi

Production
- Producer: Ravi Malik
- Cinematography: Moloy Dasgupta
- Editor: Deepak Kapoor
- Running time: 150 minutes

Original release
- Release: 1994

Woh Chokri (English: That Chick) is a 1994 Indian film directed by Subhankar Ghosh, starring Pallavi Joshi, Neena Gupta, Paresh Rawal and Om Puri. The film won 3 awards in National Film Awards – 1993. Pallavi Joshi won National Film Award – Special Jury Award, whereas Paresh Rawal won the National Film Award for Best Supporting Actor and Neena Gupta that of the National Film Award for Best Supporting Actress for this film.

== Plot ==
Geeta Devi is one of the daughters-in-law of a prominent and wealthy family, who is unfortunately widowed. Still youthful and attractive, she gives in to the wiles of one of the men in the neighbourhood, Lalit Ramji, and starts living with him. She has a daughter, Apsara by him, and the three are portrayed as a happy family.

One day, Lalit disappears without explanation, and from then on, the lives of the abandoned mother and daughter go steadily downward. Apsara is forced to leave school when her parents' past is known to the school authorities; with no income, their landlord is forced to let them go, and they have to move to a hutment colony. Geeta begins work as a maidservant in order to earn a living and support her daughter. One of the poignant themes in the movie is Apsara's relationship with her father, to whose illusory love she hangs on with a childlike and, in the end, horribly unjustified faith.

Learning that Lalit is now a successful politician, Apsara persuades her mother to travel to New Delhi to meet him as she is sure her father will rescue them from their terrible condition. Rejected, the mother returns, and having lost all hope and faith in human goodness, takes to alcohol. Soon after, she dies leaving her daughter aged 16 all alone.

The daughter takes up her mother's job as maidservant in the house of a widower of 15 years. He seems genuinely concerned for the welfare of the girl and slowly gains her trust and finally asks her to come live with him despite the age gap. After some initial reluctance, the girl finally accepts and starts living with Om Puri, and briefly the young girl is restored to a secure life free of want. Her protector then dies of a heart attack. His relatives accuse the girl of murder and she is taken into custody and questioned by the police. After a few months, she is released for lack of evidence. Left to her own devices, she works for a time as a prostitute.

In Mumbai, she lives in the railway station with three other street children, even acquiring a status of leadership among them. One day, she learns that her father is coming to the city from Delhi and will be giving a conference. She decides to attend and during the conference, she gets up and starts shouting to her father that she is his daughter. Lalit ignores her calls and she is escorted out by the police and left a few miles down the road.

She then realizes that her mother was right and that her father had really abandoned them to their fate. Faced with the cruelty that life can show, she is walking along, loudly lamenting her fate and reviling life, when one of her father's henchmen slips up behind her, and brutally kills her. The film ends with her dying on the grass.

== Cast ==
- Neena Gupta as Geeta Devi
- Paresh Rawal as Lalit Ramji
- Om Puri
- Pallavi Joshi as Apsara
