= Panaah (film) =

- Directed by: Krishnakant Pandya
- Written by: Satish Jain
- Produced by: Lawrence D'Souza; M Pandya
- Starring: Naseeruddin Shah; Siddharth Ray; Kiran Kumar; Praveen Kumar Sobti; Pallavi Joshi
- Music by: Nadeem-Shravan
- Release date: 14 February 1992
- Country: India
- Language: Hindi

Panaah is a 1992 Indian Hindi-language action masala film directed by Krishnakant Pandya. It stars Naseeruddin Shah, Siddharth Ray, Kiran Kumar, Praveen Kumar Sobti and Pallavi Joshi in pivotal roles. The film was successful at the box office.

== Cast ==
- Naseeruddin Shah as Deva
- Praveen Kumar Sobti as Bheema
- Siddharth Ray as Jeeva
- Jeet Upendra as Rama
- Pallavi Joshi as Priyanka Kulkarni
- Pran as Joseph
- Kiran Kumar as Vikraal Singh
- Mohsin Memon as Raja
- Harish Patel as Lala Ibu

== Soundtrack ==
The soundtrack of the movie was composed by the music duo Nadeem-Shravan. The lyrics were written by Vishweshwar Sharma.

Song	Singer
"De De Na Mujhko"	Asha Bhosle
"Reshmi Zulfen"	Alisha Chinai
"Thoda Matke Se Pani Zara De"	Kumar Sanu, Sadhana Sargam
"Kabhi Lage Ke Yeh Sara Sach Hai, Kabhi Lage Yeh Sara Jhuth Hai"	Kumar Sanu, Udit Narayan, Sadhana Sargam
"Koi Na Jane Kab Tu Kahan"	Udit Narayan, Vicky Mehta, Sadhana Sargam, Sarika Kapoor
"Teri Panaah Mein Hamen Rakhna"	Udit Narayan, Vicky Mehta, Sadhana Sargam, Sarika Kapoor
"Teri Panaah Mein Hamen Rakhna" (Female)	Sadhana Sargam, Sarika Kapoor
