= Mansoor Khan =

Indian film director and producer

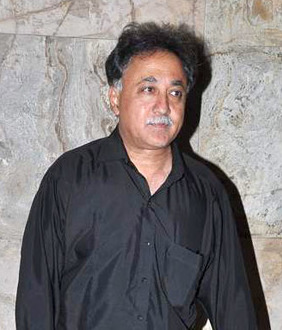
- Born: 30 May 1958 (age 68); Hyderabad, India
- Occupations: Filmmaker, scriptwriter
- Years active: 1988–2008
- Spouse: Tina Khan
- Children: 2
- Father: Nasir Hussain
- Relatives: Aamir Khan (cousin); Imran Khan (Nephew); See Khan–Hussain family

Mohammed Mansoor Hussain Khan (born 30 May 1958) is an Indian film director and producer known for his works in Hindi cinema.

== Early and personal life ==
He is the son of film-maker Nasir Hussain and cousin of actor Aamir Khan who he casts in many of his films. Khan attended IIT Bombay, Cornell University, and MIT before making his foray into Hindi cinema.

Khan is settled in Coonoor, Tamil Nadu with his wife Tina, where he indulges in farming. Their children are daughter Zayn Marie, an actress, and son Pablo.

== Film career ==
Khan made his directorial debut with the super-hit Qayamat Se Qayamat Tak (1988), for which Khan received the National Film Award for Best Popular Film Providing Wholesome Entertainment, and his only Filmfare Award for Best Director for that year. Mansoor Khan's directorial debut paved the way back for the musical romantic genre in Hindi Cinema.

He followed this success four years later with Jo Jeeta Wohi Sikander (1992). Mansoor Khan's last two films; Akele Hum Akele Tum (1995) and Josh (2000) were moderately successful. In 2008, he made a comeback, albeit as a producer, and has co-produced the movie Jaane Tu... Ya Jaane Na along with Aamir Khan, which marked the debut of his nephew Imran Khan.

== Filmography ==
| Year | Film | Role | Notes |
|---|---|---|---|
| 1988 | Qayamat Se Qayamat Tak | Director | Debut film |
| 1992 | Jo Jeeta Wohi Sikander | Director | Indian adaptation of Breaking Away (1979) |
| 1995 | Akele Hum Akele Tum | Director | Indian adaptation of Kramer vs. Kramer (1979) |
| 2000 | Josh | Director | Indian adaptation of West Side Story (1961) |
| 2008 | Jaane Tu Ya Jaane Na | Producer | |
| 2025 | Ek Din | Producer | Completed |

== Books ==
He has launched a book, "The Third Curve" (2013), which talks about the world economy. He talks about unsustainable cities and society's false understanding of money in his book.

His second book, titled "One: The story of the Ultimate Myth", was published in Aug 2023. The key idea behind the book is the oneness and interconnectedness of life that the modern world, in many ways, doesn't seem to understand.

== Awards and nominations ==
Won:

National Film Awards

- National Film Award for Best Popular Film Providing Wholesome Entertainment (director) - Qayamat Se Qayamat Tak (1988)

Filmfare Awards

- Filmfare Award for Best Director - Qayamat Se Qayamat Tak (1988)

Nominated:

Filmfare Award for Best Director- Jo Jeeta Wohi Sikandar (1993)

Filmfare Award for Best Film- Akele Hum Akele Tum (1996)

Filmfare Award for Best Director- Akele Hum Akele Tum (1996)

Filmfare Award for Best Director- Josh (2001)
