= Bhujangayyana Dashavathara =

- Directed by: Lokesh
- Written by: Lokesh
- Screenplay by: Lokesh
- Based on: Bhujangayyana Dashavathara by Srikrishna Alanahalli
- Produced by: Girija Lokesh; Lata; Jayamma
- Starring: Lokesh; Pallavi Joshi; Girija Lokesh
- Cinematography: S. Ramachandra
- Edited by: Suresh Urs
- Music by: Hamsalekha
- Production company: Belli There
- Release date: 4 January 1991
- Running time: 135 minutes
- Country: India
- Language: Kannada

Bhujangayyana Dashavathara is a 1988 Indian Kannada-language political drama film directed and produced by Lokesh, based on the novel of the same name by Srikrishna Alanahalli. Besides Lokesh as the protagonist, the film stars Pallavi Joshi and Girija Lokesh.

The film opened on 4 January 1991 and won numerous awards including the Best Film in Karnataka State Film Awards, best story and best supporting actor. At the Filmfare Awards South, the film won the best director award to Lokesh. However, the film performed poorly at the box office and incurred huge financial losses for Lokesh.

== Cast ==
- Lokesh as Bhujangayya
- Pallavi Joshi
- Girija Lokesh
- Vadiraj
- Krishne Gowda
- Chandre Gowda
- Brahmavar
- G. V. Sharadha
- Prema
- Master Srujan
- Master Balaraj

== Soundtrack ==
Bhujangayyana Dashavathara

Soundtrack album by Hamsalekha
- Language: Kannada

The music of the film was composed by Hamsalekha.

| No. | Song | Singers | Lyricist |
|---|---|---|---|
| 1 | "Moretora Byaada" | C. Ashwath | Hamsalekha |
| 2 | "Naramanushya" | C. Ashwath | Hamsalekha |
| 3 | "Ivanyaramma" | Latha Hamsalekha | Hamsalekha |
| 4 | "Yappo Yappo Enu Janmavo" | S. P. Balasubrahmanyam | Hamsalekha |
| 5 | "Neenolidare" | Chandrika Gururaj, Venkata Raghavan | Hamsalekha |
| 6 | "Baare Baramma" | K. J. Yesudas | Hamsalekha |

== Awards and honors ==
- 1990-91: Karnataka State Film Awards
1. Third Best Film
2. Best Supporting Actress - Girija Lokesh
3. Best Story - Srikrishna Alanahalli
- 1991 : Filmfare Awards South
1. Filmfare Award for Best Director - Kannada : Lokesh
