= Rukmavati Ki Haveli =

- Directed by: Govind Nihalani
- Written by: Federico García Lorca (play); Govind Nihalani (screenplay)
- Starring: Uttara Baokar, Ila Arun, Kitu Gidwani, Jyoti Subhash, Pallavi Joshi, Sohaila Kapur, Suneeta Sengupta.
- Cinematography: Govind Nihalani
- Music by: Ila Arun
- Release date: 1991
- Country: India
- Language: Hindi

Rukmavati Ki Haveli (English: Rukmavati's Mansion) is a 1991 Indian film. The film is directed by Govind Nihalani and is based on Federico Garcia Lorca's Spanish play The House of Bernarda Alba. The screenplay is written by Nihalani himself.

== Plot ==
Nihalani's screenplay transports Lorca's Spanish setting on to a Rajasthan village. Rukmavati, a domineering matriarch has five daughters Savitri, Damayanti, Chandra, Mumal and Padma, all unmarried. The domineering woman has inexorable control over her daughters placing them all in a repressive setting where they don't have any social life of their own outside their home. The frustrated and angry daughters respond in their individual ways to their mother's cruelty leading to a tragic ending.

Nahar Singh starts courting the eldest daughter Savitri but the youngest daughter Padma falls in love with him. He also responds to her. This makes Mumal jealous of her. One night as Padma goes out with Nahar, Mumal follows them leading to a confrontation. Rukmavati fires at Nahar. Padma commits suicide. Rukmavati, shaken but unbending still, has only to say, "My daughter died a virgin."

== Cast ==
- Uttara Baokar as Rukmavati.
- Ila Arun as Savitri.
- Kitu Gidwani as Mumal.
- Pallavi Joshi as Padma.
- Jyoti Subhash as Dhapabai.
- Sohaila Kapur as Damayanti.
- Suneeta Sengupta as Chandra.
- Shikha Diwan as Bhanwari.
- chandrima bhaduri as Nanisa.

== Awards ==
Ajay Munjal and A.M. Padmanabhan won the 39th National Film Awards for Best Audiography and Samir Chanda for Best Art Direction for the film.
