= Andha Yudh =

- Directed by: Dayal Nihalani
- Written by: Vasant Dev (dialogue)
- Story by: Neeta Sharma
- Produced by: Neeta D.Sharma; D.K Sharma
- Starring: Raj Babbar; Nana Patekar; Avinash Masurekar; Rohini Hattangadi; Divya Rana; Pallavi Joshi; Shivaji Satam
- Cinematography: Sanjay Dharankar
- Edited by: K.Somnath
- Music by: Ajit Varman
- Release date: 1 January 1988
- Running time: 138 minutes
- Country: India
- Language: Hindi

Andha Yudh is a 1987 Indian action drama thriller film directed by Dayal Nihalani. The film was remade in Kannada as Khaki (2003).

== Plot ==
The story revolves around an evil politician – a junior minister who plots the murder of the chief minister through a hired killer. After the assassination of the chief minister, the killer is pursued by an idealistic dedicated police chief. The killer takes shelter in a house where a physically challenged girl is residing. The killer takes her as hostage. The killer remembers his past and how an above average student was converted to a killer. Though the film had no songs, the background music for the film, especially for the chase sequence, was lauded by the critics.

== Cast ==
- Raj Babbar as Raja
- Nana Patekar as Suhas Dandekar, Superintendent of Police
- Avinash Masurekar as Dr. Avinash
- Divya Rana as Madhuri Pande, Nurse
- Rohini Hattangadi as Shalini
- Pallavi Joshi as Saroj
- Shivaji Satam as Divakar
- Anant Jog as Sub Inspector Vijay Gupta
- Sudhir Pandey as Sampatrao Mahadik

== Awards ==
34th Filmfare Awards:

Nominated

- Best Supporting Actor – Nana Patekar
- Best Supporting Actress – Pallavi Joshi
