= Thendral Sudum =

- Poster
- Directed by: Manobala
- Screenplay by: M. Karunanidhi
- Story by: Mohan Kaul; Ravi Kapoor
- Produced by: G. Babu
- Starring: Nizhalgal Ravi; Radikaa
- Cinematography: B. S. Lokanath
- Music by: Ilaiyaraaja
- Production company: G. B. Art Combines
- Distributed by: Associate Films
- Release date: 10 March 1989
- Country: India
- Language: Tamil

Thendral Sudum (transl. The breeze burns) is a 1989 Indian Tamil-language action thriller film directed by Manobala and written by M. Karunanidhi, starring Nizhalgal Ravi and Radikaa. It is a remake of the Hindi film Khoon Bhari Maang (1988), itself loosely based on the Australian miniseries Return to Eden (1983). The film revolves around a woman seeking revenge on her husband after surviving a murder attempt by him. It was released on 10 March 1989.

== Plot ==
Kala, a docile woman, is pushed into a crocodile's jaws by her husband Anand during their honeymoon. Having survived the murder attempt, she undergoes plastic surgery and seeks revenge on Anand.

== Cast ==
- Nizhalgal Ravi as Anand
- Radikaa as Kala
- Manorama
- Sarath Babu
- Charuhasan
- S. S. Chandran
- Senthil
- Radha Ravi
- Baby Aarthi

== Production ==
When Radikaa approached Manobala to remake Khoon Bhari Maang in Tamil, he was initially reluctant due to his lack of interest in directing remakes, but he accepted after she assured him that changes would be made to suit the interest of Tamil-speaking audiences, and the screenplay would be written by Karunanidhi. Karunanidhi was criticised by his opponents for adapting a Hindi film, given his opposition to the Hindi language.

== Soundtrack ==
The soundtrack was composed by Ilaiyaraaja. His son Yuvan Shankar Raja debuted as a playback singer with this film.

Track listing
No.	Title	Lyrics	Singer(s)	Length
1.	"Dhoori Dhoori"	Vaali	S. Janaki, Yuvan Shankar Raja, Bhavatharini	4:34
2.	"Oru Raaja"	Vaali	K. S. Chithra, S. P. Sailaja	4:55
3.	"Kannama Kannama"	Ilaiyaraaja	Ilaiyaraaja	4:25
4.	"Dhoori Dhoori" (pathos)	Vaali	P. Susheela	3:27
5.	"Aathaadi Allikodi"	Vaali	Uma Ramanan	4:39
Total length:				22:00

== Release and reception ==
Thendral Sudum was released on 10 March 1989. N. Krishnaswamy of The Indian Express wrote, "Thendral Sudum despite the familiar theme manages to keep alive viewer interest because of neat characterisation [..] and good acting". P. S. S. of Kalki praised the performances of Radikaa, Nizhalgal Ravi and Lokanath's cinematography, he also praised the dialogues of Karunanidhi by updating himself for modern times but felt the dialogues he had written for the emotional sequences were old-fashioned, similar to Parasakthi (1952).
