= Akele Hum Akele Tum =

1995 Indian romantic drama film

- Film poster
- Directed by: Mansoor Khan
- Written by: Mansoor Khan; Nasir Hussain (dialogue)
- Based on: Kramer vs. Kramer
- Produced by: Champak Jain; Ratan Jain
- Starring: Aamir Khan; Manisha Koirala; Adil Rizvi
- Cinematography: Baba Azmi
- Edited by: Zafar Sultan
- Music by: Anu Malik
- Production company: Venus Movies
- Distributed by: United Seven Combines
- Release date: 1 December 1995
- Running time: 163 minutes
- Country: India
- Language: Hindi
- Budget: ₹4.50 crore
- Box office: ₹12.37 crore

Akele Hum Akele Tum (transl. I'm Alone, You're Alone) is a 1995 Indian Hindi-language musical romantic drama film starring Aamir Khan, Manisha Koirala, and Master Adil. It was directed by Mansoor Khan. The music is by Anu Malik and the lyrics are by Majrooh Sultanpuri. The film is loosely based on the 1979 American film Kramer vs. Kramer. Both Aamir Khan and Manisha Koirala's performances were acclaimed; the latter also received a nomination in the Best Actress category at the 41st Filmfare Awards. Upon release, the film faced competition from Ram Jaane but it did well at the box office.

== Plot ==
Rohit Kumar (Aamir Khan) is an aspiring playback singer while Kiran (Manisha Koirala) is an ambitious classical singer-in-training. They meet, relate to each other's sentiments, fall in love and get married shortly. When Kiran's parents oppose their marriage, they decide to lead a separate life.

After marriage, Kiran's ambitions take a backseat to her household responsibilities and looking after their son. Time fails to abate Kiran's frustration until she decides to leave Rohit and start a new life all over again. Now single, Rohit is forced to look after both his son and his own failing career. After some obvious teething troubles, Rohit succeeds in creating a separate world for himself and his son, Sunil.

Meanwhile, Kiran becomes a huge film star. She tries to reconcile with Rohit but Rohit is a proud man and misinterprets her support as her pity and things become worse. A court case is eventually filed for the custody of Sunil.

Rohit faces a tough time preparing for the case as his financial position is not as sound as Kiran's. He sells his best songs at a very low price so that he can fight the custody battle. During the court battle, Kiran's lawyer Bhujbal (Paresh Rawal) uses every possible trick to show that Rohit does not deserve the custody of his child. He even uses the information that Rohit had told Kiran only because he felt that she had a right to know about her son's life against him. Rohit instructs his lawyer to fight the case honestly as he does not wish to hurt Kiran and her reputation. In the end, the court rules in favour of the mother and Kiran is given custody of the child. During this time, common friends of Rohit and Kiran try to explain to Kiran that Rohit had changed for the better and that he is now very attached to his son. Kiran also realises that their son would never find happiness only with her. She tells Rohit that she will not take Sunil away and that she wants him to stay at his home to which Rohit replies that this was Kiran's home as well. Kiran seemingly moves to get out of the house but then closes the door and smiles.

Rohit and Kiran hug each other and their son as the movie ends.

== Cast ==
- Aamir Khan as Rohit Kumar
- Manisha Koirala as Kiran Kumar (Rohit's wife)
- Adil Rizvi as Sunil "Sonu" Kumar (Rohit and Kiran's son)
- Deven Verma as Kanhaiya
- Tanvi Azmi as Farida
- Rohini Hattangadi as Mrs. Dayal
- Paresh Rawal as Advocate Bhujbal
- Aanjjan Srivastav as Ram Dayal
- Rakesh Roshan as Paresh Kapoor
- Shafi Inamdar as Amar
- Satish Shah as Gulbadan Kumar
- Harish Patel as Kaushik
- Navneet Nishan as Sunita (Kiran's Friend)
- Neeraj Vora as Moolchand (Grocer)
- Mushtaq Khan as Mr. Bhatija (Rohit's Lawyer)
- Dinesh Hingoo as Jamshed, Hotel Owner
- Shashi Kiran as Ravinder Kapoor
- Suresh Bhagwat as Prakash (Tailor)
- Razzak Khan as Babulal
- Hiralal as Hira Lal
- Viju Khote (actor playing role of an NRI)
- Ayesha Jhulka as award presenter
- Yunus Parvez as Mehra, Restaurant and Disco bar owner(uncredited)
- Ghanshyam (actor playing role to insult an NRI)
- Jennifer Winget as young girl

== Music ==
Akele Hum Akele Tum

Soundtrack album by Anu Malik
- Released: 1995
- Genre: Feature film soundtrack
- Length: 28:12
- Language: Hindi
- Label: Venus Records & Tapes

The music was composed by Anu Malik and the lyrics were penned by Majrooh Sultanpuri. "Raja Ko Rani Se", the tune of which was sampled from Love Theme from The Godfather and "Dil Kehta Hai" were memorable numbers from the film. According to Box Office India, with around 25,00,000 units sold, this film's soundtrack was the year's ninth highest-selling album.

#	Songs	Singer(s)
1.	"Raja Ko Rani Se Pyaar" (Version I)	Udit Narayan & Alka Yagnik
2.	"Aisa Zakham Diya Hai"	Udit Narayan, Shankar Mahadevan & Aamir Khan
3.	"Dil Kehta Hai"	Kumar Sanu & Alka Yagnik
4.	"Dil Mera Churaya Kyun"	Kumar Sanu & Anu Malik
5.	"Akele Hum Akele Tum"	Udit Narayan & Aditya Narayan
6.	"Raja Ko Rani Se Pyaar" (Version II)	Kumar Sanu & Alka Yagnik

== Awards and nominations ==
41st Filmfare Awards

Nominated

- Best Film – Mansoor Khan
- Best Director – Mansoor Khan
- Best Actress – Manisha Koirala
- Best Supporting Actress – Tanvi Azmi
- Best Music Director – Anu Malik
- Best Lyricist – Majrooh Sultanpuri for "Raja Ko Rani Se"
- Best Male Playback Singer – Udit Narayan for "Raja Ko Rani Se"
- Best Female Playback Singer – Alka Yagnik for "Raja Ko Rani Se"
