= Majrooh Sultanpuri =

Indian Urdu poet and Hindi language lyricist (1919-2000)

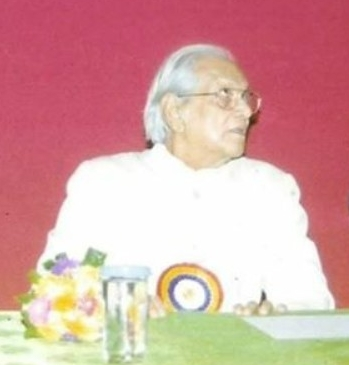

Background information
- Born: Asrar ul Hassan Khan; 1 October 1919; Sultanpur, United Provinces of Agra and Oudh, British India (now Uttar Pradesh, India)
- Died: 24 May 2000 (aged 80) Mumbai, Maharashtra, India
- Occupations: poet, lyricist, film songwriter
- Years active: 1946–2000

Asrar ul Hassan Khan (1 October 1919 − 24 May 2000), better known as Majrooh Sultanpuri, was an Indian Urdu poet and lyricist in the Hindi language film industry. He wrote lyrics for numerous Hindi film soundtracks. He was one of the dominant musical forces in Indian cinema in the 1950s and early 1960s, and was an important figure in the Progressive Writers' Movement. He is considered one of the finest avant-garde Urdu poets of 20th century literature.

In his career spanning six decades, he worked with many music directors. He won the Filmfare Best Lyricist Award in 1965 for the song "Chahunga Main Tujhe" in the film Dosti, and the highest award in Indian cinema, the Dadasaheb Phalke Award for lifetime achievement in 1993. In the 1980s and 1990s, most of his work was with Anand–Milind, their most notable collaborations being Qayamat Se Qayamat Tak, Lal Dupatta Malmal Ka, Love, and Dahek. He also wrote for Jatin-Lalit films like Jo Jeeta Wohi Sikander and their debut film Yaara Dildara.

== Early life ==
Majrooh Sultanpuri was born as Asrar ul Hassan Khan in a Muslim Rajput family, in Sultanpur, Uttar Pradesh, where his father was posted in the Police Department in 1919/1920. His father was not too keen on his son receiving English education and Majrooh was therefore sent for traditional 'Madrasa education' which led to his obtaining the qualification first of Dars-e-Nizami – a seven-year course which concentrated on religious affairs along with proficiency in Arabic and Persian- and then the certificate of 'Alim. He thereafter joined Lucknow's Takmeel-ut-Tib College of Unani medicine.

He was a struggling Hakim when he happened to recite one of his ghazals at a mushaira in Sultanpur. The ghazal was a hit with the audience and Majrooh decided to drop his fledgling medical practice and began writing poetry seriously. Soon he was a 'regular' at mushairas and a "shagird" i.e. disciple of the then top name in Urdu Mushairas viz Jigar Moradabadi. While Majrooh is popular as a film lyricist and is widely known in that capacity, be it known that he also created one of the best-known verses of Urdu poetry:

میں اکیلے ہی چلا تھا جانب منزل مگر

لوگ ساتھ آتے گئے اور کارواں بنتا گیا

maiñ akelā hī calā thā jānib-e-manzil magar

log sāth āte gaye aur kārvān bantā gayā

(I had set off alone towards the destination but people joined in and we became a caravan!)

== Films ==
In 1945, Majrooh visited Bombay to attend a mushaira at the Saboo Siddique Institute. Here his ghazals and poetry were highly appreciated by the audience. One of the impressed listeners was film producer A.R. Kardar. He contacted Jigar Moradabadi who helped him get in touch with Majrooh. However, Majrooh refused to write for films because he did not think very highly of them. But Jigar Moradabadi persuaded him, saying that films would pay well and would help Majrooh support his family. Kardar then took him to music composer Naushad who put the young writer to test. He gave Majrooh a tune and asked him to write something in the same metre, and Majrooh wrote Jab Usne Gesu Bikhraye, Badal Aaye Jhoom Ke.... Naushad liked what he wrote and Majrooh was signed on as the lyricist for the film Shah Jehan (1946).

Majrooh subsequently wrote lyrics for films like Naatak (1947), Doli (1947) and Anjuman (1948) but his major breakthrough came with Mehboob Khan's Andaz (1949).

He was sentenced to two years imprisonment due to his politically-charged poems in 1949. Having to start his film career afresh, Majrooh finally broke through again with the Guru Dutt films Baaz (1953).

Majrooh Sultanpuri worked with many music directors like Anil Biswas, Naushad, Ghulam Mohammed, Madan Mohan, O. P. Nayyar, Roshan, Salil Chowdhury, Chitragupt, N. Datta, Kalyanji-Anandji, Laxmikant-Pyarelal and R. D. Burman.

His last film as a lyricist was One 2 Ka 4, which was released after his death in 2001.

== Political leanings ==
Film Shah Jehan (1946) was followed by S. Fazil's Mehndi, Doli (1947), Mehboob's Andaz (1949) and Shaheed Latif's Arzoo. Just as Majrooh was establishing himself as a lyricist and songwriter of repute, his leftist leanings got him into trouble. The government wasn't amused by his anti-establishment poems and he was jailed in 1949 along with other leftists like Balraj Sahni. Majrooh's arrest took place during a nationwide arrest of communists after the 2nd Congress of the Communist Party of India in 1948, in which the communists had decided to carry out a revolution against the Indian government. Majrooh was asked to apologise, but he refused and was sentenced to two years in prison. He was arrested in 1951 for writing and reciting a poem in which Jawaharlal Nehru was compared to Hitler.

== Awards and recognitions ==
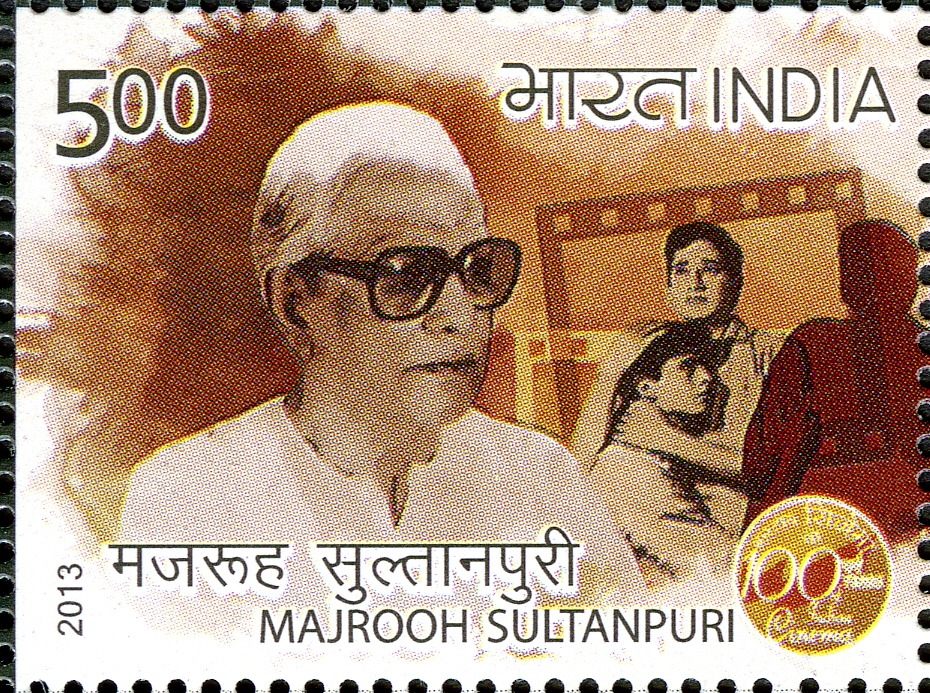
Sultanpuri on a 2013 stamp of India

Majrooh went on to write lyrics for popular films throughout the 1950s. Along with Faiz Ahmed Faiz, Khumar Barabankvi, Majrooh was considered the most notable ghazal writer.

Majrooh won his only Filmfare Best Lyricist Award for the song "Chahunga Mein Tujhe Saanj Savere" from Dosti in 1965. He was also awarded the Dadasaheb Phalke Award in 1993 and became the first lyricist to win the prestigious award.

== Death ==
Majrooh Sultanpuri had been suffering from lung disease for some time and had a severe attack of pneumonia and died in Mumbai on 24 May 2000. He was aged 80 at the time of his death.

== Discography ==
Year	Film	Songs	Language
1963	Laagi Nahi Chhute Ram	All Songs	Bhojpuri
1969	Talash	All Songs	Hindi
1970	Pardesi	All Songs	Hindi
1986	Ek Aur Sikander	All songs	
1987	Watan Ke Rakhwale	All songs	
1987	Inaam Dus Hazaar	All songs	
1988	Qayamat Se Qayamat Tak	All songs	Hindi
1988	Janam Janam	"Barkha Rut Bhi Aaj" and "Kahe Dag Mag Teri"	
1988	Ghar Ghar Ki Kahani	"Dulhe Raja Ki Soorat Dekho", "Kisi Se Jab Pyar Hua", and "Dadi Maa Dadi Maa"	Hindi
1988	Zahreelay	All songs	
1989	Lal Dupatta Malmal Ka	All songs	
1989	Phir Laharaya Lal Dupatta	All songs	Hindi
1990	Yaara Dildara	All songs	Hindi
1990	Tum Mere Ho	All songs	Hindi
1990	Nyay Anyay	All songs	
1990	Shiva	All songs	
1990	Ghar Ho To Aisa	All songs	Hindi
1990	Daulat Ki Jung	All songs	Hindi
1990	Kanoon Ki Zanjeer	All songs	Hindi
1991	Aayee Milan Ki Raat	"Mat Ro Mere Dil" and "Dekhein Apni Kismat Mein"	Hindi
1991	Jo Jeeta Wohi Sikandar	All songs	Hindi
1991	Love	All songs	Hindi
1991	Dastoor	All songs	
1991	Hai Meri Jaan	"Kahan Chali Ae Nazneen" and "Ghunghat Mera Jane Kya Hua"	Hindi
1991	Yaar Meri Zindagi	All songs	Hindi
1991	Humshakal	All songs	Hindi
1992	Honeymoon	"Yun Na Dekho Tasvir Banke" and "Aadha Tera Dil Aadha Mera Dil"	Hindi
1992	Gurudev	All songs except "Aaja Sunle Sada"	
1992	Rishta Ho To Aisa	All songs	Hindi
1992	Ek Ladka Ek Ladki	All songs except "Chhoti Si Duniya Mohabbat Ki" and "Ande Se Aayee Murgi"	Hindi
1992	Badi Bahen(1992)	All songs	Hindi
1992	Dil Aashna Hai	All songs	Hindi
1992	Mr. Bond	"Jab Do Dil Milte Hain"	Hindi
1992	Nargis	All songs	Hindi
1993	Lootere	"Aa Ja Aanewale Aaja", "Oye Pape", and "Meri Barbaad Mohabbat Pukare"	Hindi
1993	Apaatkaal	All songs	Hindi
1993	Laqshya	"Tere Bina O Mere", "Bekhudi Ke Nashe", and "Raftar Hai Zindagi Ki"	Hindi
1994	Andaz Apna Apna	All songs	Hindi
1994	Kabhi Haan Kabhi Naa	All songs	Hindi
1994	Baazi	All songs except "Na Jaane Kya Ho Gaya"	
1995	Akele Hum Akele Tum	All songs	Hindi
1995	Guddu	All songs	
1995	Paandav	Ye Haina Pyar Hi To Haina", "Pyar Ka Andaz Tum", and "Ye Chaman Jo Jal Gaya"	Hindi
1996	Khamoshi: The Musical	All songs	Hindi
1996	Ghatak	All songs except "Koi Jaaye To Le Aaye"	Hindi
1996	Daraar	"Main Hi Main"	Hindi
1996	Aisi Bhi Kya Jaldi Hai...	All songs	Hindi
1996	Naam Kya Hai	All songs	Hindi
1997	Dil Ke Jharoke Main	All songs	Hindi
1997	Yugpurush	All songs	
1997	Asha Bhosle's Jaanam Samjha Karo	All songs	Hindi
1998	Dhoondte Reh Jaaoge!	All songs	Hindi
1999	Kartoos	All songs	
1999	Dahek	All songs	
1999	Jaanam Samjha Karo	All songs	Hindi
1999	Pyaar Koi Khel Nahin	All songs	Hindi
2000	Hum To Mohabbat Karega	All songs	Hindi
2000	Kya Kehna	All songs	Hindi
2000	Pukar	All songs except "Kay Sera Sera"	
2001	One 2 Ka 4	All songs	Hindi
2001	Mujhe Meri Biwi Se Bachaao	All songs	Hindi
