= List of Hindi films of 2021 =

This is a list of Bollywood films that were released in 2021.

== Box office collection ==
The highest-grossing Bollywood films released in 2021, by worldwide box office gross revenue, are as follows.

Highest worldwide gross of 2021
Rank	Title	Production company	Distributor	Worldwide gross	Ref.
1	Sooryavanshi	Reliance Entertainment; Rohit Shetty Picturez; Dharma Productions; Cape of Good Films	Reliance Entertainment; PVR Pictures	₹302.52 crore (US$40.93 million)	
2	83	Reliance Entertainment; Phantom Films; Vibri Media; KA Productions; Nadiadwala Grandson Entertainment; Kabir Khan Films	Reliance Entertainment; PVR Pictures	₹193.73 crore (US$26.21 million)	
3	Antim: The Final Truth	Salman Khan Films	Zee Studios	₹59.11 crore (US$8 million)	
4	Bell Bottom	Pooja Entertainment; Emmay Entertainment	Pen Marudhar Entertainment	₹50.58 crore (US$6.84 million)	
5	Chandigarh Kare Aashiqui	T-Series Films; Guy in the Sky Pictures	AA Films	₹41.23 crore (US$5.58 million)	
6	Tadap	Fox Star Studios; Nadiadwala Grandson Entertainment	Fox Star Studios	₹34.86 crore (US$4.72 million)	
7	Roohi	Maddock Films; Jio Studios	Jio Studios	₹30.33 crore (US$4.1 million)	
8	Mumbai Saga	T-Series Films; White Feather Films	AA Films	₹22.29 crore (US$3.02 million)	
9	Bunty Aur Babli 2	Yash Raj Films		₹22.12 crore (US$2.99 million)	
10	Radhe	Zee Studios; Salman Khan Films; Sohail Khan Productions; Reel Life Production	Zee Studios; Zee Plex; ZEE5	₹18.33 crore (US$2.48 million)	(Note: The film was released in premium video on demand in India)

== January–March ==
Opening		Title	Director	Cast	Studio (production house)	Ref.
J A N	1	Nail Polish	Bugs Bhargava Krishna	Arjun Rampal; Manav Kaul; Madhoo; Anand Tiwari; Samreen Kaur	Ten Years Younger Productions LLP, Dhirajj Walk of Arts Pvt Ltd, ZEE5	
J A N	1	Ramprasad Ki Tehrvi	Seema Pahwa	Naseeruddin Shah; Vinay Pathak; Vikrant Massey; Konkona Sen Sharma; Vineet Kumar; Manoj Pahwa; Parambrata Chattopadhyay; Supriya Pathak; Deepika Amin; Ninad Kamat	Jio Studios, Drishyam Films	
J A N	7	Kaagaz	Satish Kaushik	Pankaj Tripathi; Monal Gajjar; Amar Upadhyay; Tina Ahuja; Lankesh Bhardwaj	Salman Khan Films, The Satish Kaushik Entertainment, ZEE5	
J A N	8	12 'O' Clock	Ram Gopal Varma	Mithun Chakraborty; Makarand Deshpande; Flora Saini; Manav Kaul; Krishna Gautam	A Company Product	
J A N	14	The Power	Mahesh Manjrekar	Vidyut Jammwal; Shruti Haasan; Mahesh Manjrekar; Zakir Hussain; Sachin Khedekar; Jisshu Sengupta; Prateik Babbar; Yuvika Chaudhary	Zee Plex, Pen Studios, Galani Entertainment, ZEE5	
J A N	15	Tribhanga	Renuka Shahane	Kajol; Tanvi Azmi; Mithila Palkar; Kunaal Roy Kapur; Vaibhav Tatwawaadi; Manav Gohil; Kanwaljit Singh	Ajay Devgn FFilms, Banijay, Alchemy Films, Netflix	
J A N	21	Jamun	Gaurav Mehra	Raghubir Yadav; Shweta Basu Prasad; Sunny Hinduja; Saurabh Goyal; Krishna Singh Bisht; Bijou Thaangjam; Susheel Parashar	Filmwala Factory, Spark Kreation, Eros Now	
J A N	22	Madam Chief Minister	Subhash Kapoor	Richa Chadda; Manav Kaul; Akshay Oberoi; Saurabh Shukla	T-Series Films, Kangra Talkies	
J A N	22	Machaan	Nitesh Tiwari	Pawan Waval; Richa Kalra; Prateek Goyal; Shubham Srivastav; Mahmood Hashmi; Prem Sagar Singh; Mishti Singh	Shemaroo Entertainment, Catfish Media, Anshi Films	
J A N	29	Maassab	Aditya Om	Shiva Suryavanshi; Sheetal Singh; Kritika Singh; Chandrabhushan Singh	Purushottam Studios	
J A N	29	Main Mulayam Singh Yadav	Suvendu Raj Ghosh	Amyth Sethi; Sana Amin Sheikh; Govind Namdeo	Ms Production	
J A N	29	Satya Sai Baba	Vicky Ranawat	Anup Jalota; Jackie Shroff	A-One Cine Creation, Atman Films	
F E B	4	Lahore Confidential	Kunal Kohli	Richa Chadha; Karishma Tanna; Arunoday Singh	JAR Pictures, ZEE5	
F E B	12	Sakshi	Ajay Ram	Vikram Mastal; Madhumita Bishwas; Gehana Vasisth	CR Films	
F E B	14	Bawri Chhori	Kartik Ramalingam	Aahana Kumra; Rumana Molla; Vikram Koccher; Niki Walia; Sohaila Kapoor	Big Films Media FZ LLC, Manna Pictures, Eros Now,	
F E B	19	Tuesdays and Fridays	Taranveer Singh	Anmol Dhillon; Jhataleka Malhotra; Zoa Morani; Reem Sheikh; Ibraheem Choudhry; Niki Walia; Parmeet Sethi	T-Series Films, Bhansali Productions	
F E B	19	Tank Cleaner	Parvinder Singh Wraich	Vinamarjot Singh Wraich; Money Sabharwal; Mridula Mahajan	Redi Productions	
F E B	26	The Girl on the Train	Ribhu Dasgupta	Parineeti Chopra; Aditi Rao Hydari; Kirti Kulhari; Avinash Tiwary	Reliance Entertainment, Netflix	
M A R	8	Bombay Rose	Gitanjali Rao	Cyli Khare; Amit Deondi; Anurag Kashyap; Makrand Deshpande	Cinestaan Film Company, Les Films d'Ici, Gitanjali Rao Films, Netflix	
M A R	11	Roohi	Hardik Mehta	Rajkummar Rao; Janhvi Kapoor; Varun Sharma	Maddock Films, Jio Studios	
M A R	11	Mera Fauji Calling	Aaryaan Saxena	Sharman Joshi; Vikram Singh; Bidita Bag; Mugdha Godse; Zarina Wahab; Shishir Sharma	Running Horses Films, Ovez Productions, Causeway Media Network PVT. LTD.	
M A R	12	Time to Dance	Stanley D'Costa	Sooraj Pancholi; Isabelle Kaif; Waluscha De Sousa	T Films UK Limited	
M A R	19	Ahaan	Nikhil Pherwani	Arif Zakaria; Abuli Mamaji; Niharika Singh; Plabita Borthakur; Rajit Kapur	Willl Finds Way Films	
M A R	19	Mumbai Saga	Sanjay Gupta	John Abraham; Emraan Hashmi; Suniel Shetty; Kajal Aggarwal; Prateik Babbar; Rohit Roy; Anjana Sukhani; Samir Soni; Amole Gupte; Gulshan Grover; Mahesh Manjrekar	T-Series Films, White Feather Films	
M A R	19	Sandeep Aur Pinky Faraar	Dibakar Banerjee	Arjun Kapoor; Parineeti Chopra	Yash Raj Films, DBP	
M A R	19	The Wife	Sarmad Khan	Gurmeet Choudhary; Sayani Datta	ZEE5, Zee Studios	
M A R	21	Switchh	Mustufa Raj	Vikrant Massey; Naren Kumar; Madhu Sneha; Tanvi Vyas; Veer Aryan; Niten Mirani	Eros Now, Nine Hope Productions	
M A R	26	D Company	Ram Gopal Varma	Ashwat Kanth Sharma.; Abhilash Chaudhary; Pranay Dixit; Rudra Kanth; Naina Ganguly; Irra Mor	Spark Productions	
M A R	26	Pagglait	Umesh Bist	Sanya Malhotra; Shruti Sharma; Sayani Gupta; Ashutosh Rana; Raghubir Yadav; Rajesh Tailang; Sheeba Chaddha; Meghna Malik	Balaji Motion Pictures, Sikhya Entertainment, Netflix	
M A R	26	Raag	Arvind Tripathi	Rajpal Yadav; Heena Panchal; Milind Gunaji; Mohan Joshi; Yashpal Sharma; Rakesh Bedi; Sudha Chandran; Mushtaq Khan; Bharti Soni	Hari Kripa Films	
M A R	26	Saina	Amole Gupte	Parineeti Chopra; Manav Kaul; Paresh Rawal	T-Series Films, Front Foot Pictures, Amole Gupte Cinema	
M A R	26	Silence... Can You Hear It?	Aban Bharucha Deohans	Manoj Bajpayee; Prachi Desai; Arjun Mathur; Sahil Vaid; Vaquar; Barkha Singh; Shirish Sharma; Sohaila Kapoor; Amit Thakkar; Garima Yagnik	Zee Studios, Candid Creations, ZEE5	

== April–June ==
Opening		Title	Director	Cast	Studio (production house)	Ref.
A P R	2	Flight	Suraj Joshi	Mohit Chadda; Pavan Malhotra; Zakir Hussain; Vivek Vaswani; Shibani Bedi; Pritam Singh	Reliance Entertainment, Crazy Boyz Entertainment	
A P R	2	Koi Jaane Na	Amin Hajee	Kunal Kapoor; Amyra Dastur	T-Series Films, Amin Hajee Film Company	
A P R	8	The Big Bull	Kookie Gulati	Abhishek Bachchan; Ileana D'Cruz; Sohum Shah; Nikita Dutta	Ajay Devgn FFilms, Anand Pandit Motion Pictures, Disney+ Hotstar	
A P R	9	Hello Charlie	Pankaj Saraswat	Aadar Jain; Jackie Shroff; Elnaaz Norouzi; Shlokka Pandit	Excel Entertainment, Amazon Prime Video	
A P R	16	99 Songs	Vishwesh Krishnamoorthy	Ehan Bhat; Edilsy Vargas; Tenzin Dalha; Aditya Seal; Lisa Ray; Manisha Koirala	Jio Studios, YM Movies, Ideal Entertainment	
A P R	16	Aa Bhi Ja O Piya	Rajesh Harivansh Mishra	Dev Sharma; Smriti Kashyap; Mukul Nag; Rakesh Shrivastav; Sanjeeb Dasgupta	Johar Entertainment	
A P R	16	Ajeeb Daastaans	Shashank Khaitan; Raj Mehta; Neeraj Ghaywan; Kayoze Irani	Fatima Sana Shaikh; Jaideep Ahlawat; Nushrratt Bharuccha; Abhishek Banerjee; Inayat Verma; Konkona Sen Sharma; Aditi Rao Hydari; Shefali Shah; Manav Kaul; Tota Roy Chowdhury	Dharmatic Entertainment, Netflix	
A P R	16	Bansuri: The Flute	Hari Viswanath	Anurag Kashyap; Rituparna Sengupta; Upendra Limaye	Vision 3 Global Pvt Ltd, HarryToonz Studio	
A P R	16	Raat Baaki Hai	Avinash Das	Paoli Dam; Anup Soni; Rahul Dev; Dipannita Sharma	ZEE5	
M A Y	1	B.A. Pass 3	Narendra Singh	Sunny Sachdeva; Ankita Chouhan; Armaan Sandhu; Ankita Sahu; Arjun Fauzdar; Namish Anand; Amanda Bhogal; Yash Gulati	FilmyBOX	
M A Y	7	Meel Patthar	Ivan Ayr	Suvinder Vicky; Lakshvir Saran	Jabberwockee Talkies, Netflix	
M A Y	9	Hum Bhi Akele Tum Bhi Akele	Harish Vyas	Zareen Khan; Anshuman Jha; Gurfateh Pirzada; Jahnvi Rawat; Denzil Smith	First Ray Films, Disney+ Hotstar	
M A Y	13	Radhe	Prabhu Deva	Salman Khan; Disha Patani; Jackie Shroff; Randeep Hooda; Megha Akash	Salman Khan Films, Zee Studios, Sohail Khan Productions, Reel Life Production, ZEE5, Zee Plex	
M A Y	18	Sardar Ka Grandson	Kaashvie Nair	Arjun Kapoor; Rakul Preet Singh; Neena Gupta; John Abraham; Aditi Rao Hydari; Soni Razdan; Kanwaljit Singh; Kumud Mishra	T-Series Films, JA Entertainment, Emmay Entertainment, Netflix	
J U N	11	Shaadisthan	Raj Singh Chaudhary	Kirti Kulhari; Medha Shankr; Nivedita Bhattacharya	Opticus INC, Famous Studios, Disney+ Hotstar	
J U N	11	Skater Girl	Manjari Makijany	Rachel Sanchita Gupta; Shraddha Gaikwad; Amrit Maghera; Waheeda Rehman	Skatepark Films, Mac Productions, Netflix	
J U N	18	Sherni	Amit V. Masurkar	Vidya Balan; Sharat Saxena; Mukul Chaddha; Vijay Raaz; Ila Arun; Brijendra Kala; Neeraj Kabi	T-Series Films, Abundantia Entertainment, Critical Mass Films, Amazon Prime Video,	

== July–September ==
Opening		Title	Director	Cast	Studio (production house)	Ref.
J U L	2	Haseen Dillruba	Vinil Mathew	Taapsee Pannu; Vikrant Massey; Harshvardhan Rane	T-Series Films, Colour Yellow Productions, Eros International, Netflix	
J U L	9	Collar Bomb	Dnyanesh Zoting	Jimmy Sheirgill; Asha Negi; Rajshri Deshpande	Yoodlee Films, 3 Earth Entertainment, Disney+ Hotstar	
J U L	9	State of Siege: Temple Attack	Ken Ghosh	Akshaye Khanna; Abhimanyu Singh; Gautam Rode; Vivek Dahiya; Akshay Oberoi; Parvin Dabas; Samir Soni; Mir Sarwar; Manjari Fadnis	Contiloe Pictures, ZEE5	
J U L	16	Toofaan	Rakeysh Omprakash Mehra	Farhan Akhtar; Paresh Rawal; Mrunal Thakur	Excel Entertainment, ROMP Pictures Amazon Prime Video	
J U L	23	14 Phere	Devanshu Singh	Vikrant Massey; Kriti Kharbanda	Zee Studios, ZEE5	
J U L	23	Hungama 2	Priyadarshan	Paresh Rawal; Shilpa Shetty; Meezaan Jafri; Pranitha Subhash; Rajpal Yadav; Tiku Talsania; Ashutosh Rana; Manoj Joshi; Johny Lever	Venus Worldwide Entertainment, Disney+ Hotstar	
J U L	26	Mimi	Laxman Utekar	Kriti Sanon; Pankaj Tripathi; Sai Tamhankar; Manoj Pahwa; Supriya Pathak	Maddock Originals, Jio Studios, Netflix, JioCinema	
A U G	6	Dial 100	Rensil D'Silva	Manoj Bajpayee; Neena Gupta; Sakshi Tanwar	Sony Pictures Films India, Alchemy Films, ZEE5	
A U G	6	Oye Mamu	Vikram Singh	Ruslaan Mumtaz; Kulraj Randhawa	Fourth Wall Entertainment	
A U G	12	Shershaah	Vishnuvardhan	Sidharth Malhotra; Kiara Advani; Shiv Panditt; Raj Arjun; Pranay Pachauri; Himmanshoo A. Malhotra; Nikitin Dheer; Ankita Goraya; Anil Charanjeett; Sahil Vaid; Shataf Figar; Pawan Chopra	Dharma Productions, Kaash Entertainment, Amazon Prime Video	
A U G	13	Bhuj: The Pride of India	Abhishek Dudhaiya	Ajay Devgn; Sanjay Dutt; Sharad Kelkar; Sonakshi Sinha; Ammy Virk; Pranitha Subhash; Nora Fatehi; Ihana Dhillon	T-Series Films, Ajay Devgn FFilms, Select Media Holdings, Disney+ Hotstar	
A U G	19	Bell Bottom	Ranjit M Tewari	Akshay Kumar; Vaani Kapoor; Huma Qureshi; Lara Dutta	Pooja Entertainment, Emmay Entertainment	
A U G	20	200 – Halla Ho	Sarthak Dasgupta	Amol Palekar; Barun Sobti; Rinku Rajguru; Sahil Khattar; Saloni Batra; Indraneil Sengupta; Upendra Limaye	Saregama, Yoodlee Films, ZEE5	
A U G	27	Chehre	Rumi Jafry	Amitabh Bachchan; Emraan Hashmi; Krystle D'Souza; Rhea Chakraborty; Siddhanth Kapoor; Annu Kapoor; Dhritiman Chatterjee; Raghubir Yadav	Anand Pandit Motion Pictures, Saraswati Entertainment, Jannock Films	
S E P	3	Helmet	Satramm Ramani	Aparshakti Khurana; Pranutan Bahl; Abhishek Banerjee; Ashish Verma; Dino Morea; Sharib Hashmi	Sony Pictures Networks Productions, DM Movies, ZEE5	
S E P	3	Faactory	Faisal Khan	Faisal Khan; Roaleey Ryan; Rajkumar Kanojia; Ribbhu Mehra; Sharad Singh; Asha Singh	M S Films and Productions	
S E P	10	Bhoot Police	Pavan Kirpalani	Saif Ali Khan; Arjun Kapoor; Jacqueline Fernandez; Yami Gautam; Javed Jaffrey	Tips Industries, 12th Street Entertainment, Disney+ Hotstar	
S E P	10	Kya Meri Sonam Gupta Bewafa Hai?	Ssaurabh Tyagi	Jassie Gill; Surbhi Jyoti; Surekha Sikri; Vijay Raaz; Brijendra Kala; Atul Shrivastava	Pen Studios, ZEE5	
S E P	10	Thalaivii (Note: Bilingual film, also releasing in Tamil)	A. L. Vijay	Kangana Ranaut; Arvind Swami	Vibri Motion Pictures, Karma Media And Entertainment, Zee Studios, Gothic Entertainment, Sprint Films	
S E P	10	Urf Ghanta	Aayush Saxena	Jitu Shivhare; Ravi Kishan	ShemarooMe, SRMD Entertainment, Biiggbang	
S E P	17	Ankahi Kahaniya	Ashwiny Iyer Tiwari; Abhishek Chaubey; Saket Chaudhary	Abhishek Banerjee; Rinku Rajguru; Delzad Hiwale; Kunal Kapoor; Zoya Hussain; Nikhil Dwivedi; Palomi Ghosh	RSVP Movies, Flying Unicorn Entertainment, Earthsky Pictures, MacGuffin Pictures, Slugline Films, Netflix	
S E P	18	Haathi Mere Saathi (Note: Trilingual film, also releasing in Telugu and Tamil)	Prabhu Solomon	Rana Daggubati; Pulkit Samrat; Shriya Pilgaonkar	Eros International, Eros Now	

== October–December ==
Opening		Title	Director	Cast	Studio (production house)	Ref.
O C T	1	Shiddat	Kunal Deshmukh	Sunny Kaushal; Radhika Madan; Mohit Raina; Diana Penty	T-Series Films, Maddock Films, Disney+ Hotstar	
O C T	1	Sumeru	Avinash Dhyani	Avinash Dhyani; Sanskriti Bhatt; Shagufta Ali	Padmasiddhi Films	
O C T	15	Rashmi Rocket	Akarsh Khurana	Taapsee Pannu; Priyanshu Painyuli; Abhishek Banerjee; Shweta Tripathi; Supriya Pathak	RSVP Movies, Mango People Media, ZEE5	
O C T	15	Sanak	Kanishk Varma	Vidyut Jammwal; Rukmini Maitra; Neha Dhupia; Chandan Roy Sanyal; Chandan Roy; Amole Gupte	Zee Studios, Sunshine Pictures, Disney+ Hotstar	
O C T	16	Sardar Udham	Shoojit Sircar	Vicky Kaushal; Banita Sandhu	Rising Sun Films, Kino Works, Amazon Prime Video	
O C T	22	Bhavai	Hardik Gajjar	Pratik Gandhi; Aindrita Ray	Pen Studios, Hardik Gajjar Films, Backbencher Pictures	
O C T	22	Babloo Bachelor	Agnidev Chatterjee	Sharman Joshi; Pooja Chopra; Tejashri Pradhan	Rafat Films	
O C T	29	Aafat-E-Ishq	Indrajit Nattoji	Neha Sharma; Deepak Dobriyal; Namit Das; Ila Arun; Amit Sial	Zee Studios, ZEE5	
O C T	29	Bekhudi	Amit Kasaria	Adhyayan Suman; Angel; Gulki Joshi	Dreamspark Movies, Vijay Arts	
O C T	29	Dybbuk	Jay K	Emraan Hashmi; Nikita Dutta; Manav Kaul	T-Series Films, Panorama Studios, Amazon Prime Video	
O C T	29	Hum Do Hamare Do	Abhishek Jain	Rajkummar Rao; Kriti Sanon; Paresh Rawal; Ratna Pathak Shah	Maddock Films, Disney+ Hotstar	
N O V	5	Meenakshi Sundareshwar	Vivek Soni	Abhimanyu Dassani; Sanya Malhotra	Dharmatic Entertainment, Netflix	
N O V	5	Sooryavanshi	Rohit Shetty	Akshay Kumar; Katrina Kaif; Ajay Devgn; Ranveer Singh; Jaaved Jaaferi; Jackie Shroff; Gulshan Grover	Reliance Entertainment, Dharma Productions, Cape of Good Films, Rohit Shetty Picturez	
N O V	12	Squad	Nilesh Sahay	Rinzing Denzongpa; Malvika Raaj; Pooja Batra; Mohan Kapoor; Amit Gaur	Zee Studios, Indian Media Entertainment, ZEE5	
N O V	19	Bunty Aur Babli 2	Varun V. Sharma	Saif Ali Khan; Rani Mukerji; Siddhant Chaturvedi; Sharvari Wagh	Yash Raj Films	
N O V	19	Dhamaka	Ram Madhvani	Kartik Aaryan; Mrunal Thakur; Amruta Subhash; Vikas Kumar; Vishwajeet Pradhan	RSVP Movies, Ram Madhvani Films, Lotte Entertainment, Globalgate Entertainment, Lionsgate, Netflix	
N O V	19	Cash	Rishab Seth	Amol Parashar; Smiriti Kalra; Swanand Kirkire; Gulshan Grover; Kavin Dave	Vishesh Bhatt Production, Disney+ Hotstar	
N O V	19	Ye Mard Bechara	Anuup Thapa	Veeraj Rao; Manukriti Pahwa; Seema Pahwa; Manikk Chaudhary; Brijendra Kala; Atul Srivastava; Sapna Sand	2Idiot Films, Raw Entertainment	
N O V	25	Satyameva Jayate 2	Milap Zaveri	John Abraham; Divya Khosla Kumar	T-Series Films, Emmay Entertainment	
N O V	26	Antim: The Final Truth	Mahesh Manjrekar	Salman Khan; Aayush Sharma; Mahima Makwana	Salman Khan Films, Zee Studios	
N O V	26	Chhorii	Vishal Furia	Nushrratt Bharuccha	T-Series Films, Abundantia Entertainment, Crypt TV, Amazon Prime Video	
D E C	3	Tadap	Milan Luthria	Ahan Shetty; Tara Sutaria	Fox Star Studios, Nadiadwala Grandson Entertainment	
D E C	3	Bob Biswas	Diya Annapurna Ghosh	Abhishek Bachchan; Chitrangada Singh	Red Chillies Entertainment, Bound Script, ZEE5	
D E C	10	Chandigarh Kare Aashiqui	Abhishek Kapoor	Ayushmann Khurrana; Vaani Kapoor	T-Series Films, Guy in the Sky Pictures	
D E C	10	Velle	Deven Munjal	Karan Deol; Abhay Deol; Mouni Roy; Anya Singh	Ajay Devgn FFilms, Intercut Entertainment	
D E C	10	Code Name Abdul	Eshwar Gunturu	Tanishaa Mukerji	Avantika Productions, Mise en Scene Films	
D E C	17	420 IPC	Manish Gupta	Vinay Pathak; Ranvir Shorey; Gul Panag; Rohan Mehra	Zee Studios, Kyoorius Digital P.L, ZEE5	
D E C	24	83	Kabir Khan	Ranveer Singh; Deepika Padukone; Tahir Raj Bhasin; Jiiva; Saqib Saleem; Ammy Virk; Harrdy Sandhu	KA Productions, Kabir Khan Films, Vibri Motion Pictures, Nadiadwala Grandson Entertainment, Reliance Entertainment, Phantom Films	
D E C	24	Atrangi Re	Aanand L. Rai	Dhanush; Sara Ali Khan; Akshay Kumar	T-Series Films, Colour Yellow Productions, Cape of Good Films, Disney+ Hotstar	
D E C	31	Murder at Teesri Manzil 302	Navneet Baj Saini	Irrfan Khan; Ranvir Shorey; Deepal Shaw; Lucky Ali	Quantum Films ltd., Practical Productions, ZEE5	
D E C	31	Waah Zindagi	Dinesh S Yadav	Naveen Kasturia; Plabita Borthakur; Vijay Raaz; Sanjay Mishra; Dharmesh Vyas; Manoj Joshi	Shivazza Films & Entertainment, ZEE5	

== See also ==
- List of Hindi films of 2022
- List of Hindi films of 2020
