= Nakash Aziz =

Indian music composer and singer

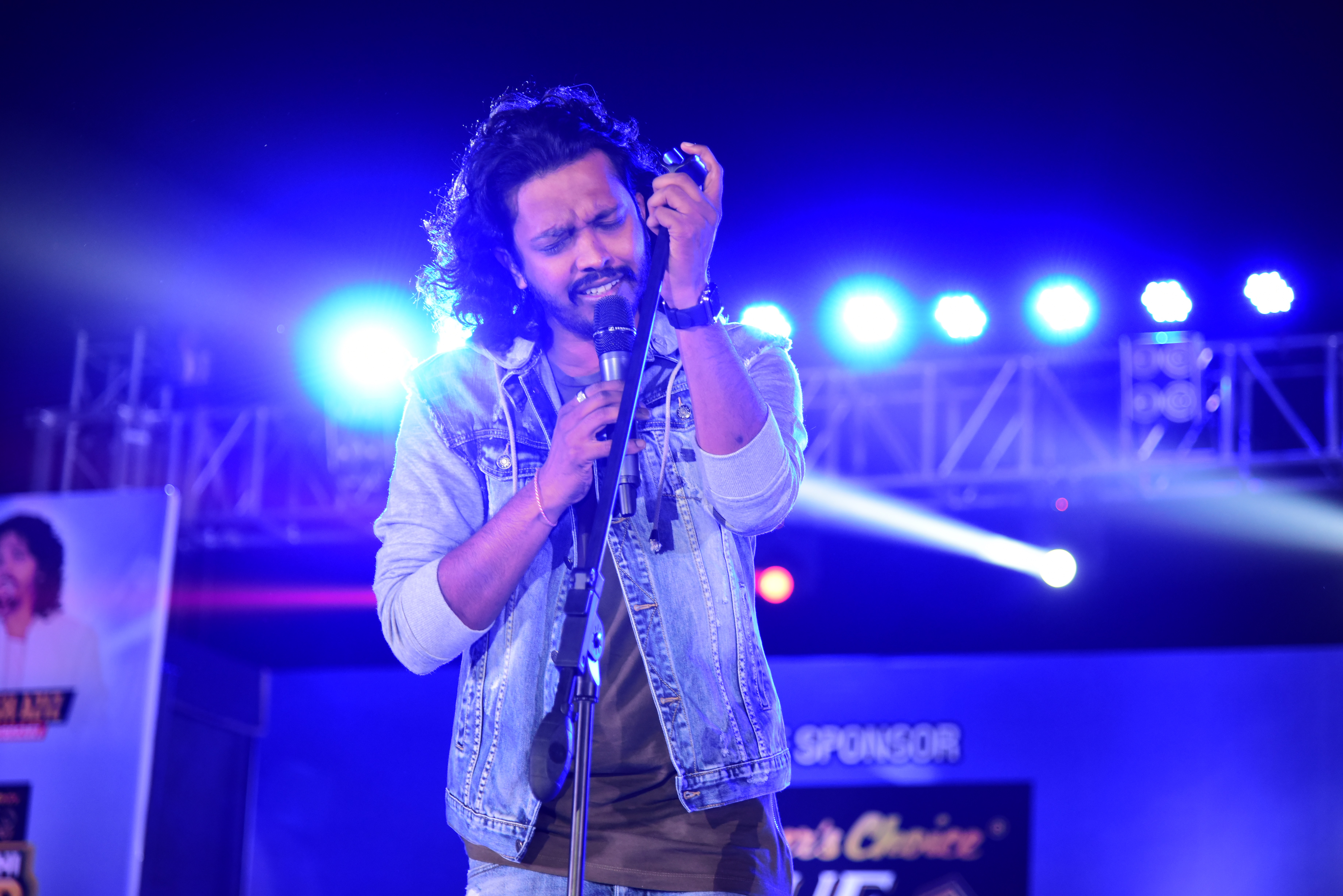
- Nakash Aziz at studio

Background information
- Born: 24 February 1985 (age 41); Mangaluru, Karnataka, India
- Genres: Filmi, Indian pop, Folk-pop, acoustic music, pop rock
- Occupations: Composer, singer
- Years active: 2010–present
- Spouse: Ruby Shaikh (m. 2020)

Nakash Aziz (born 24 February 1985), also known as Nakash, is an Indian singer and assistant composer. He has worked as an assistant to composer A. R. Rahman on films such as Highway, Raanjhanaa, Rockstar, Delhi 6 and I (Hindi dubbed). He is known for playback performances of songs like "Jabra Fan" from Fan, "Sari Ke Fall Sa" and "Gandi Baat" from the film R... Rajkumar (2013) and "Dhating Nach" from film Phata Poster Nikhla Hero (2013).

== Early life ==
Aziz is originally from Moodabidri, a taluk centre of Mangaluru in Dakshina Kannada district. He belongs to a family of singers. He worked as a composer for jingles and devotional albums before becoming a playback singer. He married Ruby Shaikh in August, 2020. He now lives in Mumbai with his family.

In 2021, Nakash Aziz appeared on Jay-Ho! The Jay Kumar Show pointed out that reality TV often values ratings and drama over real experiences. He noted that while some shows cause controversy for views, the best ones balance entertainment with genuine talent. Nakash also shared his interest in hosting or judging a show someday, aiming to add his own fresh twist.

== Discography as vocalist ==
=== Hindi film songs ===
Year	Film	Song	Composer(s)	Writer(s)	Co-singer(s)
2010	Aisha	"Suno Aisha"	Amit Trivedi	Javed Akhtar	Amit Trivedi, Ash King
2012	Agent Vinod	"Pungi"	Pritam	Amitabh Bhattacharya	Mika Singh, Amitabh Bhattacharya, Pritam, Javed Jaffrey
2012	Cocktail	"Second Hand Jawaani"	Pritam	Amitabh Bhattacharya	Miss Pooja, Neha Kakkar
2013	Baat Bann Gayi	"Bhago Mohan Pyare"	Pritam		
2013	R... Rajkumar	"Saree Ke Fall Sa (Touch Karke)"	Pritam	Mayur Puri	Antara Mitra
2013	R... Rajkumar	"Gandi Baat" (Film Version)	Pritam	Anupam Amod	Ritu Pathak
2013	Phata Poster Nikhla Hero	"Dhating Naach"	Amitabh Bhattacharya	Neha Kakkar	
2013	Raanjhanaa	"Nazar Laaye"	A. R. Rahman	Irshad Kamil	Rashid Ali, Neeti Mohan
2014	Lekar Hum Deewana Dil	"Beqasoor"	A. R. Rahman	Amitabh Bhattacharya	Shweta Pandit
2014	Lekar Hum Deewana Dil	"Tu Shining"	A. R. Rahman	Amitabh Bhattacharya	Hriday Gattani
2014	The Hundred Foot Journey	"Afreen"	A. R. Rahman		K.M.M.C. Sufi Ensemble
2015	I (D)	"Issak Tarri"	A. R. Rahman	Irshad Kamil	Neeti Mohan
2015	Hunterrr	"Thaali Hai Khaali"	Probit Dutt		
2015	Bajrangi Bhaijaan	"Selfie Le Le Re"	Pritam	Mayur Puri	Vishal Dadlani, Pritam and Badshah
2015	Phantom	"Afghan Jalebi"	Pritam	Amitabh Bhattacharya	
2015	Tamasha	"Heer Toh Badi Sad Hai"	A. R. Rahman	Irshad Kamil	Mika Singh
2016	Jugni	"Dil Ke Sang"	Clinton Cerejo	Shellee	
2016	Jugni	"Heer"	Clinton Cerejo	Waris Shah	
2016	Mastizaade	"Dekhega Raja Trailer"	Anand Raj Anand		Neha Kakkar
2016	Ishq Forever	"Happy Birthday"	Nadeem Saifi		
2016	Yea Toh Two Much Ho Gayaa	"Chappan Taal"	Avishek Majumdar	Jairaj Selwan, Vishal V.Patil	Monali Thakur
2016	Fan	"Jabra Fan (Fan Anthem)"	Vishal–Shekhar	Varun Grover	
2016	Ishq Click	"Mana Tujhi Ko Khuda (Reprise)"	Ajay Jaiswal, Satish Tripathi	Satish Tripathi, Manisha Upadhyay	Hricha Narayana
2016	Housefull 3	"Pyar Ki Maa Ki"	Shaarib-Toshi	Manoj Yadav, Sajid-Farhad, Danish Sabri	Sharib Sabri, Toshi Sabri, Divya Kumar, Anmoll Mallik, Earl Edgar
2016	Ae Dil Hai Mushkil	"The Breakup Song"	Pritam	Amitabh Bhattacharya	Arijit Singh, Jonita Gandhi, Badshah
2016	Ae Dil Hai Mushkil	"Cutiepie"	Pritam	Amitabh Bhattacharya	Pradeep Singh Sran
2016	Dishoom	"Jaaneman Aah" (Film Version)	Pritam	Mayur Puri	Antara Mitra
2016	Banjo	"Pee Paa Ke"	Vishal–Shekhar	Amitabh Bhattacharya	Vishal Dadlani
2016	Banjo	"Om Ganapataye"	Vishal–Shekhar	Amitabh Bhattacharya	Vishal Dadlani
2016	Banjo	"Rada"	Vishal–Shekhar	Amitabh Bhattacharya	Vishal Dadlani, Shalmali Kholgade
2017	Meri Pyaari Bindu	"Ye Jawani Teri"	Sachin–Jigar	Kausar Munir	Jonita Gandhi
2017	Machine	"Chatur Naar"	Rahul Dev Burman (Recreated by: Tanishk Bagchi)		Shashaa Tirupati, Ikka Singh
2017	Phillauri	"Naughty Billo"	Shashwat Sachdev	Anvita Dutt	Diljit Dosanjh, Shilpi Paul, Anushka Sharma
2017	Tubelight	"Naach Meri Jaan"	Pritam	Amitabh Bhattacharya	Kamaal Khan, Dev Negi, Tushar Joshi
2017	Bank Chor	"Jai Baba Bank Chor"	Rochak Kohli		
2017	Ok Jaanu	"Saajan Aayo Re"	A. R. Rahman	Gulzar	Jonita Gandhi
2017	Sallu Ki Shaadi	"Sallu Ki Shaadi Title Track"	Prashant Singh, Manu Rajeev	Mohammad Israr Ansari	Manu Rajeev
2017	Muzaffar Nagar - The Burning Love	"Main Tera Majnu"	Rahul Bhatt		Neetu Singh
2017	Mukkadarpur Ka Majnu	"Something Something"	Kashi Richards	Shweta Raj	
2017	Ashley	"Aaja Nachley"	Dushyant Dubey	Amitabh Ranjan	Varun Likhate
2018	Udanchhoo	"Udanchhoo"	Avishek Majumder	Jairaj Selwan, Vishal Kumar Patil	Shalmali Kholgade
2018	Udanchhoo	"Bhul Bhulaiya"	Avishek Majumder	Tahmina Khaleel	Shalmali Kholgade
2018	Sanju	"Bhopu Baj Raha Hain"	Rohan-Rohan	Shekhar Astitwa, Rohan Gokhale	
2018	Batti Gul Meter Chalu	"Gold Tamba"	Anu Malik	Siddharth-Garima	
2018	Simmba	"Mera Wala Dance"	Lijo George-DJ Chetas	Kumaar, Kunaal Verma	Neha Kakkar
2018	Teri Bhabhi Hai Pagle	"Tequila Shot"	Aanamik Chauhan, Vijay Verma	Rajesh Manthan	Geet Sagar, Amrita Talukder
2018	2.0 (D)	"Rakshassi"	A. R. Rahman	Abbas Tyrewala	Blaaze, Kailash Kher
2018	Padmaavat	"Binte Dil"	Sanjay Leela Bhansali	A. M. Turaz	Arijit Singh
2019	Bharat	"Slow Motion"	Vishal–Shekhar	Irshad Kamil	Shreya Ghoshal
2019	Bharat	"Aithey Aa" (Dance Version)	Vishal–Shekhar	Irshad Kamil	Neeti Mohan
2019	Thackeray	"Aaya Re Thackeray"	Rohan-Rohan	Dr Sunil Jogi	
2019	Rangeela Raja	"Jogi Dil"	Ishwar Kumar	Mehboob	Sarodee Borah
2019	Petta (D)	"Ullaallaa"	Anirudh Ravichander	Raqueeb Alam~	
2019	Penalty	"Footballer"	Siddhant Madhav	Prini S. Madhav, Ozil	
2019	Chhichhore	"Fikar Not"	Pritam	Amitabh Bhattacharya	Antara Mitra, Amit Mishra, Dev Negi, Sreerama Chandra, Amitabh Bhattacharya
2019	Chhichhore	"Control"	Pritam	Amitabh Bhattacharya	Manish J. Tipu, Geet Sagar, Sreerama Chandra, Amitabha Bhattacharya
2019	Dream Girl	"Dil Ka Telephone"	Meet Bros	Kumaar	Jonita Gandhi
2019	Pagalpanti	"Walla Walla"	Nayeem-Shabir	Arafat Mehmood	Neeti Mohan, Nayeem Shah
2019	Gun Pe Done	"Gun Pe Done" (Title Track)	Rimi Dhar	Saaveri Verma	Geet Sagar, Dileish Doshi, Prashant Satose, Rimi Dhar
2020	Darbar (D)	"Napde Killi"	Anirudh Ravichander	Raqueeb Alam	
2020	Sarileru (D)	"Daang Daang"	Devi Sri Prasad	Vaibhav Joshi, Raqueeb Alam	Lavita Lobo
2020	Ala Vaikunthapurramuloo (D)	"Ramuloo Ramulaa"	S. Thaman	Raqueeb Alam	Urmila Dhangar
2020	Khaali Peeli	"Duniya Sharma Jayegi"	Vishal–Shekhar	Kumaar, Raj Shekhar	Neeti Mohan
2020	Gunjan Saxena: The Kargil Girl	"Rekha O Rekha"	Amit Trivedi	Kausar Munir	
2020	Lootcase	"Pavitra Party"	Rohan-Vinayak	Shreyas Jain	Keka Ghoshal, Arhaan Hussain
2020	AK vs AK	"Shivali"	Alokananda Dasgupta	Rajeshwari Dasgupta Ghose	
2020	Is Love Enough? - Sir	"Zindagi Ka Feel"	Ragav Vagav	Mohit Chauhan	
2020	Crazzy Lamhen	"Dhayein Dhayein"	Amit Sharad Trivedi	Suresh Rana	
2021	Vijay the Master (D)	"Chhoti Story"	Anirudh Ravichander	Raqueeb Alam	
2021	Pushpa: The Rise (D)	"Eyy Bidda Ye Mera Adda"	Devi Sri Prasad	Raqueeb Alam	
2021	Hello Charlie	"One Two One Two Dance"	Tanishk Bagchi	Vayu	
2021	Aafat-E-Ishq	"Love Ka Bhoot Reloaded"	Gaurav Chatterji	Ginny Diwan	Indrajit Nattoji
2022	Badhaai Do	"Badhaai Do - Title Track"	Tanishk Bagchi	Vayu	Rajnigandha Shekhawat, Raja Sagoo
2022	Cirkus	"Current Laga"	DJ Chetas-Lijo George	Kumaar	Jonita Gandhi, Dhvani Bhanushali, Vivek Hariharan
2022	Raw (D)	"Jolly O Gymkhana"	Anirudh Ravichander	Raqueeb Alam	
2022	Janhit Mein Jaari	"Janhit Mein Jaari Title Track"	Prini Siddhant Madhav	Raaj Shaandilyaa	Raftaar
2022	Mere Desh Ki Dharti	"Naagan Naach"	Vikram Montrose	Azeem Shirazi	Vikram Montrose
2022	10 Nahi 40	"Jogi"	Vipul Kapoor		Divya Bhatt
2022	Vanshree	"Tere Naina Mere"	Laxmi Narayan		Pamela Jain
2022	Goodbye	"Kanni Re Kanni"	Amit Trivedi	Swanand Kirkire	
2022	Uunchai	"Keti Ko"	Amit Trivedi	Irshad Kamil	
2022	Vikrant Rona (D)	"Ra Ra Rakkamma"	B. Ajaneesh Loknath	Shabbir Ahmed	Sunidhi Chauhan
2022	Kantara (D)	"Khawabon Mein"	B. Ajaneesh Loknath	Akshay Punse	Chinmayi Sripada
2022	Kantara (D)	"Le le le le" (Another Version)	B. Ajaneesh Loknath	Akshay Punse(Hindi Lyrics), Yogita Koli and Pravin Koli (Marathi Lyrics)	Nagaraj Panar Valthur
2022	Good Luck Jerry	"Cutie Cutie"	Parag Chhabra	Raj Shekhar	Parag Chhabra
2022	Ittu Si Baat	"Middle Class"	Vishal Mishra	Raj Shekhar	Vishal Mishra
2022	Subway	"Mast Maula"	Harsh	Faaiz Anwar	Harsh
2022	Cinemaa Zindabaad	"Phati Padi Hai"	Raj Prakash Bisen	Sahil Fatehpuri	Vikrant Bhartiya
2023	Bera: Ek Aghori	"Dil Mera Kho Gaya"	Prem Shakti		Vaishali Mhade
2023	Kisi Ka Bhai Kisi Ki Jaan	"Let's Dance Chotu Motu"	Devi Sri Prasad		Yo Yo Honey Singh, Neha Bhasin, Ravi Basrur, Devi Sri Prasad
2023	Jogira Sara Ra Ra	"Cocktail"	Tanishk Bagchi	Vayu	Nikhita Gandhi
2023	Dream Girl 2	"Naach"	Tanishk Bagchi	Shaan Yadav	
2023	Fukrey 3	"Macha Re"	Tanishk Bagchi	Kumaar	
2023	Mrs Undercover	"Shaani Rani"	Amit Sawant	Shloke Lal	
2023	Kanjoos Makhichoos	"Damru"	Sachin–Jigar	Vayu	Sachin–Jigar
2023	Tiku Weds Sheru	"Meri Jaan-E-Jaan"	Gaurav Chatterji	Shellee	Shreya Ghoshal, Cyli Khare
2023	Selfiee	"Selfiee Title Song"	Lijo George-DJ Chetas	Shabbir Ahmed, Azeem Dayani	Akasa Singh, Nikhita Gandhi, Lijo George-DJ Chetas
2023	Selfiee	"Selfiee Theme"	Lijo George-DJ Chetas		
2023	Bicycle Days	"Yaari"	Keyur Bhagat	Shreyash Tripathi	
2023	Bicycle Days	"Yaari" (Female Version)	Keyur Bhagat	Shreyash Tripathi	Priya Bhagat
2023	Bicycle Days	"Ae Parindey"	Keyur Bhagat		
2023	Mark Antony (D)	"I Love You Rey"	G.V.Prakash Kumar	Arafat Mehmood	Roshini JKV
2023	DarranChhoo	"DarranChhoo Title Track"	Amjad Nadeem Aamir	Alaukik Rahi	Mellow D
2023	Das Ka Dhamki (D)	"Almost Dil Ka"	Leon James	Amitabh Verma	
2023	Hi Papa (D)	"Odiyamma"	Hesham Abdul Wahab	Kausar Munir	Chinmayi Sripaada, Vishnupriya Ravi
2023	Kushi (D)	"Meri Jaane Man"	Hesham Abdul Wahab	Irshad Kamil	
2023	The Great Indian Family	"Kanhaiya Twitter"	Pritam	Amitabh Bhattacharya	
2024	Chandu Champion	'Satyanaas"	Pritam	Amitabh Bhattacharya	Arijit Singh, Dev Negi
2024	Munjya	"Hai Jamalo"	Sachin-Jigar, Skeletron	Amitabh Bhattacharya	Amitabh Bhattacharya, Jigar Saraiya
2024	Luv Ki Arrange Marriage	"Jab Bhi Naachey"	Amol-Abhishek	Abhishek Talented	
2024	Tera Kya Hoga Lovely	"Loafer Akhiyaan"	Amit Trivedi	Irshad Kamil	Deesi Madana, Ruchika Chauhan
2024	Phooli	"Udi Re Udi"	Avinash Dhyani		
2024	The Greatest of All Time (D)	"Whistle Podu"	Yuvan Shankar Raja	Raqueeb Alam	Yuvan Shankar Raja
2024	Saindhav (D)	"Wrong Usage"	Santhosh Narayanan	Manoj Yadav	
2024	Raayan (D)	"Mood Kirkira"	A.R.Rahman	Kumaar	Antara Nandy
2024	Double iSmart (D)	"SteppaMaar"	Mani Sharma	Mohsin Shaikh	Sanjana Kalmanje
2024	Devara: Part 1 (D)	"Daavudi"	Anirudh Ravichander	Kausar Munir	Akasa Singh
2024	Vettaiyan (D)	"Manasilaayo"	Anirudh Ravichander	Raqueeb Alam	Deepthi Suresh, Arun Kaundinya
2024	Kanguva (D)	"Maafi"	Devi Sri Prasad	Raqueeb Alam	
2024	Kanguva (D)	"Kanga Kanguva"	Devi Sri Prasad	Vimal Kashyap	
2024	Pushpa 2: The Rule (D)	"Pushpa Pushpa"	Devi Sri Prasad	Raqueeb Alam	Mika Singh
2024	Dard	"Loot Le Tu"	Arafat Mehmood		
2024	Krispy Rishtey	"Krispy Rishtey"	Vijay Verma	Jagat Singh	
2024	UI (D)	"Cheap Song"	B. Ajaneesh Loknath	Arafat Mahmood	Vijay Prakash, Deepak Blue
2025	Game Changer (D)	"Dam Tu Dikhaja"	S. Thaman	Kumaar	
2025	Emergency	"Singhasan Khali Karo"	G.V. Prakash Kumar	Manoj Muntashir	Udit Narayan, Nakul Abhyankar
2025	Loveyapa	"Loveyapa Ho Gaya"	White Noise Collectives	SOM	Madhubanti Bagchi
2025	Thandel (D)	"Hailessa"	Devi Sri Prasad	Raqueeb Alam	Shreya Ghoshal
2025	Inn Galiyon Mein	"Uda Hawa Mein"	Arvind Sagole	Vimal Kashyap	
2025	Sikandar	"Zohra Jabeen"	Pritam	Sameer Anjaan, Danish Sabri, Mellow D	Dev Negi, Mellow D
2025	Oye Bhootni Ke	"Oye Bhootni Ke -Title Track"	Asif Chandwani	Nitin Raikwar	Kapil Thapa
2025	Good Bad Ugly (D)	"God Bless U"	G.V. Prakash Kumar	Riya Mukherjee	Meguhwatt
2025	Janki	"Tu Banja Premika"	Toshant Kumar, Monika Verma	Monika Verma	
2025	Kuberaa (D)	"Jaake Aana Yaara"	Devi Sri Prasad	Raqueeb Alam	
2025	Sunny Sanskari Ki Tulsi Kumari	"Ishq Manzoor"	A.P.S	Jairaj	Amit Mishra, Shreya Ghoshal, Antara Mitra
2026	Karikaada (D)	"Rathuni Rathuni"	Shashank sheshagiri	Manoj Juloori	Saumya Upadhyay
2026	Peddi (D)	"Rai Rai Raa Raa"	A.R.Rahman	Raqueeb Alam	
2026	Bhooth Bangla	"O Sundari"	Pritam	Kumaar	Vishal Mishra, Antara Mitra
2026	Nagabandham (D)	"Sura Sura"	Junaid Kumar, Abhe	Vimal Kashyap	Ritesh G Rao, Nadapriya, Brinda

=== Hindi non-film songs ===
Year	Title	Album	Composer(s)	Lyricist(s)	Co-singer(s)
2023	Iss Chand Ka Kya Kehna	Iss Chand Ka Kya Kehna - Single	Sanjeev Chaturvedi	Deepak Jeswal	
2025	Rum Rum Rum	Ekaki	Sreejith Narayanan	Laado Suwalka	

=== Telugu songs ===
Year	Film	Song	Composer(s)	Writer(s)	Co-singer(s)
2010	Leader	"Vandemataram"	Mickey J Meyer		
2014	Rowdy Fellow	"Yentha Vaaru Gani"	Sunny M.R.	C. Narayana Reddy	Natasha Pinto
2015	Bengal Tiger	"Aasia Khandamlo"	Bheems Ceciroleo		
2015	Soukhyam	"You Are My Honey"	Anup Rubens		
2015	Mariyan (D)	"Sonapareeya"	A. R. Rahman		
2016	Abhinetri	"Chalmaar"	Sajid–Wajid		
2016	Remo (D)	"Love Selfie"	Anirudh Ravichander		
2016	Sardaar Gabbar Singh	"Tauba Tauba"	Devi Sri Prasad		M. M. Manasi
2016	Sarrainodu	"Blockbuster"	S. Thaman		Shreya Ghoshal, Simha, Sri Krishna, Deepu
2016	Fan (D)	"Veera Fan"	Vishal–Shekhar		
2017	Middle Class Abbayi	"MCA"	Devi Sri Prasad		
2017	Angel	"Amaravathi"	Bheems Ceciroleo		
2017	Jai Lava Kusa	"Dochestha"	Devi Sri Prasad		
2017	Goutham Nanda	"Basthi Dorasani"	S. Thaman		
2017	Mister	"Jhoomore Jhoomore"	Mickey J. Meyer		
2017	Winner	"Na B C Centrelu"	S. Thaman		
2017	Mahanubhavudu	"Bammalu Bammalluuu"	S. Thaman		
2017	Duvvada Jagannadham	"Mecchuko"	Devi Sri Prasad		
2017	Katamarayudu	"Laage Laage"	Anup Rubens		
2017	Khaidi No. 150	"Ratthalu"	Devi Sri Prasad		Jasmine Sandlas
2018	Agnyaathavaasi	"AB Yevaro Nee Baby"	Anirudh Ravichander		Arjun Chandy
2018	Touch Chesi Chudu	"Raaye Raaye"	JAM8	Kasarla Shyam	Madhu Priya
2018	Touch Chesi Chudu	"Pushpa"	JAM8	Rehman	
2018	Amar Akbar Anthony	"Khullam Khulla Chilla"	S. Thaman	Balaji	Mohana, Ramya
2018	Thugs of Hindostan (D)	"Vashamayye"	Ajay–Atul		Divya Kumar
2018	Thugs of Hindostan (D)	"Suraiyya"	Ajay–Atul		Shreya Ghoshal
2018	Chal Mohan Ranga	"Vaaram"	S. Thaman	Kedarnath	
2018	Inttelligent	"Kala Kala Kalamandir"	S. Thaman	Bhaskarabhatla Ravi Kumar	Geetha Madhuri
2018	Padmaavat (D)	"Gaji Biji"	Sanjay Leela Bhansali	Chaitanya Prasad	Divya Kumar
2019	Petta (D)	"Ullaallaa"	Anirudh Ravichander		
2019	Guna 369	"Bujji Bangaram"	Chaitan Bharadwaj		Deepthi Parthasarathy
2019	War (D)	"Jai Jai Siva Shankaraa"	Vishal–Shekhar	Chaitanya Prasad	Benny Dayal
2020	Sarileru Neekevvaru	"Daang Daang"	Devi Sri Prasad	Ramajogayya Sastry	Lavita Lobo
2020	Darbar (D)	"Dhum Dhum"	Anirudh Ravichander		
2020	Bheeshma	"Super Cute"	Mahati Swara Sagar	Sri Mani	
2020	Ammoru Thalli (D)	"Amma Aana Raa"	Girishh Gopalakrishnan	Rahman	
2020	Solo Brathuke So Better	"Amrutha"	S. Thaman	Kasarla Shyam	
2021	FCUK: Father Chitti Umaa Kaarthik	"Selfie Lelo"	Bheems Ceciroleo	Adithya	Divya Bhatt
2021	FCUK: Father Chitti Umaa Kaarthik	"Nenem Cheyya"	Bheems Ceciroleo	Adithya	
2021	Roberrt (D)	"Baby Dance Floor"	Arjun Janya	Kasarla Shyam	Aishwarya Rangarajan
2021	Yuvarathnaa	"Power Of Youth"	S. Thaman	Ramajogayya Sastry	
2021	Peddhanna (D)	"Aha Kalyanam"	D. Imman		
2021	Pushpa: The Rise	"Eyy Bidda Idhi Naa Adda"	Devi Sri Prasad	Chandrabose	
2021	Chalo Premiddham	"Em Ayyindiro"	Bheems Ceciroleo		
2022	Sarkaru Vaari Paata	"Penny"	S. Thaman		
2022	Beast (D)	"Jolly O Gymkhana"	Anirudh Ravichander	Chandrabose	
2022	Don (D)	"Jalabulajangu"	Anirudh Ravichander		
2022	Vikrant Rona (D)	"Ra Ra Rakkamma"	B. Ajaneesh Loknath	Ramajogayya Sastry	Mangli
2022	Macherla Niyojakavargam	"Chill Maro"	Mahati Swara Sagar	Krishna Chaitanya	Sanjana Kalmanje
2022	Brahmāstra: Part One – Shiva (D)	"Allari Motha"	Pritam		
2022	Krishna Vrinda Vihari	"Tara Na Tara"	Mahati Swara Sagar		
2022	Ginna	"Golisoda"	Anup Rubens		
2022	Sardar (D)	"Mere Jaan"	G. V. Prakash Kumar		
2022	Gaalodu	"Pettara DJ"	Bheems Ceciroleo		
2022	Cheppalani Vundi	"Vaadu Veedu"	Aslam Keyi		
2022	Dhamaka	"Mass Raja"	Bheems Ceciroleo		
2023	Waltair Veerayya	"Boss Party"	Devi Sri Prasad	Devi Sri Prasad	
2023	Ghar Banduk Biryani	"Ichchipadey"	AV Prafullachandra	Ananta Sriram	
2023	Hunt	"Papa Tho Pailam"	Ghibran	Kasarla Shyam	
2023	Mad	"Proud'se Single"	Bheems Ceciroleo	Raghuram	Bheems Ceciroleo
2023	Skanda	"Gandarabai"	Thaman S	Anantha Sriram	Soujanya Bhagavatula
2023	Jawan (D)	"Galatta"	Anirudh Ravichander	Chandrabose	Jonita Gandhi, Arivu
2024	Devara: Part 1	"Daavudi"	Anirudh Ravichander	Ramajogayya Sastry	Akasa Singh
2024	The Greatest of All Time (D)	"Whistle Aesko"	Yuvan Shankar Raja	Ramajogayya Sastry	Yuvan Shankar Raja
2024	Saindhav	"Wrong Usage"	Santhosh Narayanan	Chandrabose	
2024	Mukhya Gamanika	"Aa Kannula Chupullonaa"	Kiran Venna		Revati Srita
2024	Vettaiyan (D)	"Manasilaayo"	Anirudh Ravichander	Srinivasa Mouli	Deepthi Suresh, Arun Kaundinya
2024	Mechanic Rocky	"Oo Pilla"	Jakes Bejoy	Krishna Chaitanya	
2024	Pushpa 2: The Rule	"Pushpa Pushpa"	Devi Sri Prasad	Chandrabose	Deepak Blue
2024	Laggam	"Mushayira"	Charan Arjun	Sanjay Mahesh	Veeha
2024	Mr. Celebrity	"Do Lucky"	Vinod Yajamanya	A.Ganesh	
2024	UI (D)	"Cheap Song"	B. Ajaneesh Loknath	Rambabu Gosala	Vijay Prakash, Deepak Blue
2025	Game Changer	"Raa Macha Macha"	S. Thaman	Anantha Sriram	
2025	Daaku Maharaaj	"The Rage of Daaku"	S. Thaman	Anantha Sriram	Bharath Raj, Ritesh G Rao, K. Pranati
2025	Thandel	"Hilesso Hilessa"	Devi Sri Prasad	Shree Mani	Shreya Ghoshal
2025	Laila	"Atak Matak"	Leon James	Vishwak Sen	Aditi Bhavaraju
2025	Barabar Premistha	"Reddy Mama"	RR Dhruvan	Suresh Gangula	Sahithi Chaganti
2025	KD – The Devil (D)	"Setavvade"	Arjun Janya	Chandrabose	
2025	Arjun S/O Vyjayanthi	"Nayaaldhi"	B. Ajaneesh Loknath	Raghu Ram	Sony Komanduri
2025	Thammudu	"Chillax Song"	B. Ajaneesh Loknath	Kasarla Shyam	
2025	Good Bad Ugly (D)	"God Bless U"	G. V. Prakash Kumar	Krishna Kanth	Meguhwatt
2025	Krishna Leela	"Emo Emo"	Bheems Ceciroleo	Bhaskarabhatla	
2025	War 2 (D)	"Salam Anali"	Pritam	Krishna Kanth	Yazin Nizar
2025	Thamma (D)	"Nuvvu Naa Sonthama"	Sachin-Jigar	Rambabu Gosala	Madhubanti Bagchi, Sachin-Jigar
2026	Bhartha Mahasayulaku Wignyapthi	"Bella Bella"	Bheems Ceciroleo	Suresh Gangula	Rohini Sorrat
2026	Mana Shankara Vara Prasad Garu	"Mega Victory Mass"	Bheems Ceciroleo	Kasarla Shyam	Vishal Dadlani
2026	Parasakthi (D)	"Janjara Janjaraja"	G. V. Prakash Kumar	Rambabu Gosala	
2026	The RajaSaab	"Dil Mange More"	S. Thaman	Kasarla Shyam, Adviteeya Vojjala	
2026	The RajaSaab	"Nache Nache" (Hindi Song Remix)	Recreated by S. Thaman, Original by Bappi Lahiri	Faruk Kaiser, Raqueeb Alam	Brinda, Usha Uthup
2026	Seetha Payanam	"Basavanna"	Anup Rubens	Kasarla Shyam	L Keerthana
2026	Gaayapadda Simham	"Jingala"	Sweekar Agasthi	Kasyap Sreenivas, Sunil Karamkanti, Srini Josyula	
2026	M.R.P (Neekentha Naakentha)	"Kottu Kottu"	Ajay Arasada	Bhaskarabhatla	
2026	Hey Chikittha	"Gana Gana Gajanana"	Charan Arjun	SS Chiranjan	
2026	Transfer Trimurthulu	"Tata Tata"	Kalyan Nayak	Bhaskarabhatla	Kalyan Nayak
2026	Mahendragiri Varahi	"The Rage Of Varahi"	Anup Rubens	Kadali Satyanarayana	

=== Tamil songs ===
Year	Film	Song	Composer(s)	Writer(s)	Co-singer(s)
2013	Maryan	"Sonapareeya"	A. R. Rahman		Javed Ali, Haricharan, Sofia Ashraf
2016	Remo	"Tamilselvi"	Anirudh Ravichander		Anirudh Ravichander
2016	Fan (D)	"Takkara Fan"	Vishal-Shekhar	B.Vijay	
2017	Gemini Ganeshanum Suruli Raajanum	"Venilla Thangachi"	D. Imman		D. Imman, Ramya NSK
2017	Thaanaa Serndha Koottam	"Peela Peela"	Anirudh Ravichander		Jassie Gift, Maalavika Manoj
2018	Gulaebaghavali	"Heartukulla"	Vivek-Mervin	Pa. Vijay	Sanjana Diwakar
2018	Junga	"Lolikiriya"	Siddharth Vipin	Lalithanand	Marana Gaana Viji
2018	Thugs of Hindostan (D)	"Suraiyya"	Ajay–Atul		Shreya Ghoshal
2018	Thugs of Hindostan (D)	"Vashamakku"	Ajay–Atul		Divya Kumar
2018	Padmaavat (D)	"Karaipurandoadudhey Kanaa"	Sanjay Leela Bhansali	Madhan Karky	Divya Kumar
2019	Petta	"Ullaallaa"	Anirudh Ravichander		Inno Genga, Arjun Chandy
2019	Namma Veettu Pillai	"Yenga Annan"	D. Imman		Sunidhi Chauhan
2019	War (D)	"Jai Jai Siva sankaraa"	Vishal–Shekhar	Madhan Karky	Benny Dayal
2019	Sangathamizhan	"Oh My God"	Vivek-Mervin		
2020	Darbar	"Dumm Dumm"	Anirudh Ravichander	Vivek	
2020	Seeru	"Kannaala Poduraaley"	D. Imman	Viveka, RJ Vijay	RJ Vijay
2020	Mookuthi Amman	"Aatha Solra"	Girishh Gopalakrishnan	Pa. Vijay	
2021	Annaatthe	"Marudhaani"	D. Imman	Mani Amuthavan	Anthony Daasan, Vandana Srinivasan
2021	Pushpa: The Rise (D)	"Eyy Beta Idhu En Patta"	Devi Sri Prasad	Viveka	
2022	Vikrant Rona (D)	"Ra Ra Rakkamma"	B. Ajaneesh Loknath	Palani Bharathi	Sunidhi Chauhan
2022	Sardar	"Mere Jaan"	G.V. Prakash Kumar	GKB	
2023	Jawan (D)	"Pattasa"	Anirudh Ravichander	Vivek	Jonita Gandhi, Arivu
2024	Inga Naan Thaan Kingu	"Maalu Maalu"	D. Imman	Muthamil	Shweta Mohan, Anthakudi Ilayaraja
2024	Devara: Part 1 (D)	"Daavudi"	Anirudh Ravichander	Vignesh Shivan	Ramya Behara
2024	Bloody Beggar	"Naan Yaar" (Nakash Aziz Version)	Jen Martin	Vishnu Edavan	
2024	Pushpa 2: The Rule (D)	"Pushpa Pushpa"	Devi Sri Prasad	Viveka	Deepak Blue
2024	UI (D)	"Cheap Song"	B. Ajaneesh Loknath	Palani Bharathi	Vijay Prakash, Deepak Blue
2025	Game Changer (D)	"Raa Macha Macha"	S. Thaman	Vivek	
2025	KD – The Devil (D)	"Setaagaade"	Arjun Janya	Madhan Karky	
2025	War 2 (D)	"Kalaaba"	Pritam	Madhan Karky	Yazin Nizar
2026	Parasakthi	"Namakkana Kaalam"	G.V. Prakash Kumar	Arivu	Haricharan, Velmurugan

=== Kannada songs ===
Year	Film	Song	Composer(s)	Writer(s)	Co-singer(s)
2010	Thamassu	"Maar Maar"	Sandeep Chowta		
2014	Brahma	"Tingu Tingu"	Gurukiran	Kaviraj	Chaitra H. G.
2015	Uppi 2	"Baekoo Baekoo Anno" (Reprise)	Gurukiran	Upendra	
2015	Bullet Basya	"Baare Kunthkolae"	Arjun Janya	Kaviraj	Anuradha Bhat
2016	Nagarahavu	"Nodi Nodi"	Gurukiran	Kaviraj	Chaitra H. G.
2021	Yuvarathnaa	"Power Of Youth"	S. Thaman	Santhosh Ananddram	
2021	Roberrt	"Baby Dance Floor Ready"	Arjun Janya	Chethan Kumar	Aishwarya Rangarajan
2022	Trivikrama	"Shakuntala Shake Your Body"	Arjun Janya	Yogaraj Bhat	Aishwarya Rangarajan
2022	Beast (D)	"Jolly O Gymkhana"	Anirudh Ravichander	Varadaraj Chikkaballapura	
2022	Brahmāstra: Part One – Shiva (D)	"Dancina Huchchu"	Pritam	Hridaya Shiva	
2022	Vikrant Rona	"Ra Ra Rakkamma"	B. Ajaneesh Loknath	Anup Bhandari	Sunidhi Chauhan
2023	Gurudev Hoysala	"Sala Sala Hoysala"	B. Ajaneesh Loknath	Santhosh Ananddram	Yogi B
2024	Yuva	"Obbane Shiva Obbane Yuva"	B. Ajaneesh Loknath	Santhosh Ananddram	
2024	Sambhavami Yuge Yuge	"Dollu Vadhya Tamate"	Puran Shettigaar	Arasu Anthare	Sparsha
2024	Gosmari Family	"Ponna Na Telike"	Akash Prajapati	Sai Krishna Kudla	Akriti Kakar
2024	UI	"Cheap Song"	B. Ajaneesh Loknath	Upendra	Vijay Prakash, Deepak Blue
2024	UI	"Fan India Song"	B. Ajaneesh Loknath	Upendra	Tippu, Aishwarya Rangarajan
2024	Max	"Hot'tu Mamma"	B. Ajaneesh Loknath	Anup Bhandari	Aishwarya Rangarajan
2025	Just Married	"Kelo Maccha"	B. Ajaneesh Loknath	Nagarjun Sharma	
2025	Mark	"Masth Malaika"	B. Ajaneesh Loknath	Anup Bhandari	Sanvi Sudeep
2026	Seetha Payana (D)	"Basavanna"	Anup Rubens	Bharatha Janani	L Keerthana
2026	Toss	"Beda Yaava"	Kadri Manikanth	Nagarjun Sharma	
2026	Bail	"Kumari Kumari"	B. Ajaneesh Loknath	Pavan Wadeyar	Mangli

=== Malayalam songs ===
Year	Film	Song	Composer(s)	Writer(s)	Co-singer(s)
2024	Devara: Part 1 (D)	"Daavudi"	Anirudh Ravichander	Mankombu Gopalakrishnan	Ramya Behara
2024	UI (D)	"Cheap Song"	B. Ajaneesh Loknath	Santhosh Varma	Vijay Prakash, Deepak Blue

=== Bengali songs ===
Year	Film	Song	Composer(s)	Writer(s)	Co-singer(s)
2014	Yoddha: The Warrior	"Yoddhar Saathe Ebar Pujo Katan"	Savvy Gupta		
2014	Yoddha: The Warrior	"Ebar Jeno Onno Rokom Pujo"	Indraadip Dasgupta		Antara Mitra
2014	Ami Shudhu Cheyechi Tomay	"Calling Bell"	Savvy Gupta		Saberi Bhattacharya
2014	Bindaas	"Remix Qawwali" "Party Shoes"	Savvy Gupta and Dev		Neha Kakkar
2014	Bangali Babu English Mem	Honey Bunny	Dabbu	Satrujit	Ajoy, Aditi Paul
2015	Agnee 2	"Allah Jane"	Akaash		Lemis
2015	Parbona Ami Chartey Tokey	"Tumi Aashe Paashe"	Indraadip Dasgupta		Monali Thakur
2015	Aashiqui	"Topor Mathae"	Savvy Gupta		
2015	Black	"Dhip Dhip Buker Majhe"	Raja Chanda	Ajoy	
2016	Ki Kore Toke Bolbo	"Ishqaboner Bibi"	Jeet Gannguli		Akriti Kakkar
2016	Beparoyaa	"Mutton Biryani"	Indra or Kutty		
2016	Hero 420	"3G"	Savvy Gupta		Kalpana Patowary
2016	Power	"Missed Call"	Jeet Gannguli		Akriti Kakar
2016	Abhimaan	"Selfie Le Na Ra"	Suddho Roy		Jolly Das
2016	Haripada Bandwala	"Shona"	Indraadip Dasgupta		Antara Mitra
2016	Haripada Bandwala	"Eksho Vrindaban"	Indraadip Dasgupta		Payal Dev
2016	Shikari	"Uth Churi Tor"	Prosen, Indradip Dasgupta		Madhubanti
2017	Shrestha Bangali	"Dhinka Chikaa"	Sanjeev-Darshan		Akriti Kakar
2017	Boss 2: Back to Rule	"Yaara Meherbaan"	Jeet Gannguli		Jonita Gandhi
2017	Bolo Dugga Maiki	"Lukochuri"	Arindom	Dipangshu Acharya	
2018	Inspector Notty K	"Inspector Notty K - Title Track"	Suddho Roy	Raja Chanda	
2018	Hoichoi Unlimited	"Hobe Re Hoichoi"	Savvy	Riddhi Barua	
2018	Bhaijaan Elo Re	"Baby Jaan"	Dolaan Mainnakk		Antara Mitra
2018	Captain Khan	"Mama Maw Maw"	Lincon		
2018	Tui Sudhu Amar	"Mon Amar Kemon"	Dolaan Mainnakk		
2018	Naqaab	"Tokhon Baje Barota"	Dev Sen	Prasen	Gopika Goswami, Dev Sen, Tanish
2018	Ami Sudhu Tor Holam	"Chumma"	Ayush	Deep	Nirupama De
2021	Baazi	"Aaye Na Kache Re"	Jeet Gannguli	Pratik Kundu	
2022	Jaalbandi	"Bumper Policy"	Amit Ishan	Ritam Sen	
2023	Shatru	"Police Police"	Savvy	Riddhi Barua	

=== Gujarati songs ===
Year	Film	Song	Composer(s)	Writer(s)	Co-singer(s)
2015	Aa Te Kevi Dunniya	"Nathalal"	Viju Shah	Kishore Jani	
2015	Aa Te Kevi Dunniya	"Only Currency"	Viju Shah	Kishore Jani	
2016	Polam Pol	Polam Pol Title Track	Paresh – Bhavesh	Raeesh Maniar	Farhaad Bhiwandiwala & Kanchan Srivas
2017	Karsandas Pay & Use	"Aai Jyo"	Kedar – Bhargav		
2017	Best Of Luck Laalu	Best Of Luck Laalu Title Track Version -1 (Title Song)	Sachin–Jigar	Niren Bhatt	Tanishka Sanghvi
2017	Best Of Luck Laalu	Best Of Luck Laalu Title Track Version -2 (Title Song)	Sachin–Jigar	Niren Bhatt	Tanishka Sanghvi
2017	Pappa Tamne Nahi Samjaay	Pappa Tamne Nahi Samjjay Title Track	Rahul Munjaria	Ankit Trivedi	
2018	Fera Feri Hera Feri	"Icon"	Parth Bharat Thakkar	Sanjay Chhel	Jahnvi Shrimankar
2018	Y D Family	"Hu Taro Tu Mari"	Maulik Mehta	Niren Bhatt	Nayna Sharma
2019	Hungama House	"Dhing Dhing Dhamal"	Paresh Bhavesh	Iqbal Qureshi	Tarnnum Malik
2019	Hungama House	"Atrangi Ankho"	Paresh Bhavesh	Iqbal Qureshi	Tarnnum Malik
2019	Diya . . The Wonder Girl	"Bhookka" (Motivational Song)	Jatin-Pratik	Ozil Dalal	
2019	Mazza Ni Life	"Mazza Ni Life (Title Track)	Imran Raj	Vihul Jagirdar	
2021	Tari Sathe	"O Tari"	Maulik Mehta	Anil Roy	Meet Mehta
2021	Tari Sathe	"Ankh Ladi Re"	Nikhil Kamath	Keshav Rathod	
2022	Bhagwan Bachave	"Kamaal Kari Che"	Bhavesh Shah	Milind Gadhavi	
2022	Fakt Mahilao Maate	"Fakt Mahilao Maate"	Kedar Upadhyay	Bhargav Purohit	
2023	Hu ane Tu	"Supdasaaf"	Kedar-Bhargav	Bhargav Purohit	Tanishka Sanghvi
2023	Welcome Purnima	"Welcome Purnima" (Title Song)	Sanjeev-Darshan	Rishil Joshi	Nayna Sharma
2024	Parvat	"Disco Garba"	Ronak Pandit	Asif Silavat	
2024	Danny Jigar	"Chikin Dha"	Kedar-Bhargav	Bhargav Purohit	Hemali Vyas Naik, Tarannum Mallik
2024	Danny Jigar	"Danny Jigar"	Kedar-Bhargav	Bhargav Purohit	Ritu Pathak
2024	Samandar	"Maar Halesa"	Kedar-Bhargav	Bhargav Purohit	Aditya Gadhvi
2025	Victor 303	"Pankha Fast Chhe"	Kedar-Bhargav	Bhargav Purohit	
2026	Mitrata	"Aavya Che Shaana"	Parthiv Shah	Joy Mehta, Divyesh Mungra	Arvind Vegda, Parthiv Gohil

=== Marathi film songs ===
Year	Film	Song	Composer(s)	Writer(s)	Co-singer(s)
2014	Por Bazaar	"Chal Hawa Anede"	Shailendra Barve	Shrirang Godbole	
2017	Sachin: A Billion Dreams	"Sachin Sachin"	A. R. Rahman	Subodh Khanolkar	Poorvi Koutish, Nikhita Gandhi
2018	Ani... Dr. Kashinath Ghanekar	"Lalya"	Rohan-Rohan	Sachin Pathak	
2018	Pushpak Vimaan	"Mumbai Song"	Santosh Mulekar	Sameer Samant	Vinay Mandke, Arsh Mohammed, Pravin Kuvar, Deepali Sathe, Madhavi Bharti, Varnyam Pande
2020	Sweety Satarkar	"Sweety Satarkar - Title Track"	Santosh Mulekar	Mangesh Kangane	Bharti Madhvi
2020	Sweety Satarkar	"Yere Nana Yere Mama"	Santosh Mulekar	Mangesh Kangane	Rupali Moghe
2021	Basta	"Kareena Aali"	Santosh Mulekar	Mangesh Kangane	
2022	Bhirkit	"Line De Mala"	Shail-Pritane	Mangesh Kangane	Aanandi Joshi
2023	Ghar Banduk Biryani	"Maar Dhanaadan"	AV Prafullachandra	Jai Atre	AV Prafullachandra
2023	Unaad	"Yeda Mandola"	Gulraj Singh	Kshitij Patwardhan	
2023	Sshort And Ssweet	"Mann Matlabi"	Santosh Mulekar	Mangesh Kangane	
2023	Umbrella	"Ataa Pitaa"	Santosh Mulekar	Mangesh Kangane	Sunidhi Chauhan
2023	Pillu Bachelor	"Gol Gol Ek Paisa"	Chinar Mahesh	Mangesh Kangane	
2024	Sridevi Prasanna	"Dil Mein Baji Guitar"	Amitraj	Kshitij Patwardhan	Kasturi Wavre
2025	Dashavatar	"Jai Hanuman"	AV Prafullachandra	Guru Thakur	
2026	Dashami	"Buri Nazarwale"	Suresh Pandit	Vaibhav Deshmukh	

=== Pakistani films ===
Year	Film	Song	Composer(s)	Writer(s)	Co-singer(s)
2017	Mehrunisa V Lub U	"Marhabaa"	Simaab Sen	Prashant Ingole	Mohini Shri

=== Tulu films ===
Year	Film	Song	Composer(s)	Writer(s)	Co-singer(s)
2016	Pilibail Yamunakka	"Kar Baar Jorundu"	Kishore Kumar Shetty	Mayur R Shetty	YemZii
2023	Circus	"Swapna Sundari"	Loy Valentine Saldanha	Roopesh Shetty	Michelle Anisha Crasta

=== Nepali films ===
Year	Film	Song	Composer(s)	Writer(s)	Co-singer(s)
2024	Rawayan	"Rawayan"	Revan Aartti Singh	Krishna Hari Baral	
2024	12 Gaun	"Cinema Herna Jau"	Arjun Pokharel	Arjun Pokharel, Biraj Bhatta	

== Awards ==
- 2014 – Zee Cine Awards – SA RE GA MA PA Fresh Singing Talent
