= Hungama House =

2019 one shot Gujarati comedy film

- Official poster
- Directed by: Hanif Chippa
- Written by: Irshad Dalal; Late Jayesh D
- Produced by: Savya Bhati
- Starring: Jeet Kumar; Kanwal Taff; Chetan Daiya; Chini Raval; Harikrishna Dave; Madhavi Jhaveri; Hemant Jha
- Cinematography: Sahil Khan
- Edited by: Gul Ansari
- Music by: Paresh Shah - Bhavesh Shah
- Production companies: Red Velvet Cinema; Yuvraj Enterprises
- Distributed by: Rupam Entertainment Pvt Ltd
- Release date: 13 September 2019
- Running time: 141 Min
- Country: India
- Language: Gujarati

Hungama House (Gujarati: હંગામા હાઉસ) is a 2019 one shot Gujarati romantic comedy film directed by Hanif Chippa and produced by Savya Bhati under the banner of Red Velvet Cinema. Starring Jeet Kumar, Kanwat Taff, Chini Raval, Chetan Daiya, Hemant Jha, Harikrishna Dave and Madhavi Jhaveri, its cinematography is by Sahil Khan and editing by Gul Ansari. The film was released nationwide by Rupam Entertainment Pvt Ltd, on 13 September 2019.

== Plot ==
Jitu is in love with Meera, and wants to marry her. The only problem is the one condition set by Meera`s foster family: the guy marrying her should be an orphan just like her, for the sake of better compatibility and understanding. Willing to go to any lengths for Meera, Jitu lies that he is an orphan, and hence begins a series of misadventures where Jitu tries his best to keep up the charade - and save his love life! But can he?

== Cast ==
- Jeet Kumar as Jitu
- Kanwal Taff as Meera
- Chetan Daiya as Ravi
- Chini Raval as Priya
- Hemant Jha as Advocate Dhanani
- Harikrishna Dave as Pankaj
- Madhavi Jhaveri as Pankhudi
- Jignesh Modi as Gagaji
- Nimesh Soni as Ramji Bhai
- Brijal as Rupal
- Harish Dagia as Inspector Jordar
- Utsav Shah as Aadu

== Production ==
Hungama House is Gujarati Comedy Film. Which shoot in 28 Days schedule in Ahmedabad. Music of the film is given by Paresh and Bhavesh. Songs have been Sung by Nakash Aziz, Falguni Pathak, Palak Muchhal, Osman Mir, Fahad Bhivadivala, Tarnnum Malik . Zee Music Company is the official music label of the film

== Soundtrack ==
Hungama House

Soundtrack album by Paresh Bhavesh
- Released: 9 August 2019
- Recorded: 2019
- Genre: Feature film soundtrack
- Length: 16:37
- Language: Gujarati
- Label: Zee Music Company
External audio
- Audio Jukebox on YouTube

Music for the film is composed by Paresh and Bhavesh and lyrics are written by Iqbal Qureshi and Paresh Hingu.

Track list
No.	Title	Lyrics	Singer(s)	Length
1.	"Mithi Mithi Vaato"	Iqbal Qureshi	Palak Muchhal, Favad Bhivadivala	4:47
2.	"Tari Mari Jodi"	Paresh Hingu	Falguni Pathak, Osman Mir	4.10
3.	"Dhing Dhing Dhamal"	Iqbal Qureshi	Nakash Aziz, Tarnnum Malik	3:43
4.	"Atrangi Ankho"	Iqbal Qureshi	Nakash Aziz, Tarnnum Malik	4:37
Total length:				16:37

== Release ==
The official trailer of the film was released on 12 August 2019.

The film was released on 13 September 2019.
