= Amit Gupta =

Indian Playback Singer

Amit Gupta is an Indian playback singer and Bollywood performer. He is known for the song "Radhe Radhe" from the 2019 film Dream Girl featuring Ayushmann Khurrana and Nushrratt Bharuccha. He has also sung for movies including Saansein, Game Paisa Ladki, Saheb, Biwi Aur Gangster 3, Satellite Shankar, Janhit Mein Jaari, Mister Mummy, Luv Ki Arrange Marriage and Wild Wild Punjab. Gupta was nominated for the 12th Mirchi Music Awards in the category of Upcoming Male Vocalist of The Year for the song "Radhe Radhe".
