= Antara Mitra =

Indian Playback singer (born 1987)

- Born: 10 July 1987 (age 39); Maslandapur, West Bengal, India
- Education: Maslandapur Rajballavpur High School, Netaji Subhas Open University, Berklee College of Music, Boston, Massachusetts
- Partner: Saurya (2025–present)
- Awards: 2010 Mirchi Music Award - Female Vocalist of the Year for the song "Bheegi Si Bhaagi Si" 2016 Best Film Award for her song "Gerua" for the film Dilwale.
- Musical career
- Genres: Filmi, Indian classical, Folk, Indian pop, Thumri
- Occupation: Singer
- Instruments: Vocals
- Years active: 2006–present

Antara Mitra (born 10 July 1987) is an Indian Bollywood playback singer. She is noted for her wide vocal range and versatility. She has recorded songs for films and albums in different Indian Languages.

== Career ==
Antara Mitra was influenced early in her life by her aunt, who frequently sang on broadcasts of All India Radio. Her grandfather and parents were able to sing and play various instruments, and she credits this early exposure to music as influence in her career as a singer. During childhood, Mitra trained in traditional Bengali folk music and studied Hindustani classical music for approximately 10 years. In 2006, she decided not to take her medical entrance examination, and instead moved to Mumbai to pursue a music career. There, at the age of 18, she was selected as a contestant on the second season of Indian Idol. Mitra finished among the top five contestants on Indian Idol Season 2. She later appeared as part of the Bollywood team of vocalists on the Indian television reality show Junoon Kuchh Kar Dikhaane Ka. Her song “Kishori” was later featured in a promotional doodle series by the dairy brand Amul, which included imagery inspired by the iconic "Amul Girl" mascot from their long-running advertising campaign.

== Music career ==
She has sung in regional languages including Hindi, Bengali, Gujarati, Punjabi, Hariyanvi and Kannada.

In a 2010 interview with the Times of India, Mitra expressed gratitude to Music Director Pritam for being the first to believe in her talent, acknowledging that he had composed nearly every film song featuring her vocals during her initial decade in the industry. Mitra received positive reviews for her song "Bheegi Si Bhaagi Si," a duet with Mohit Chauhan from the Hindi film Rajneeti.

As of 2026, she is signed to the music label "TalentWala."

== Appearances ==
- Sang a group number and solo "Tu Rutha To" on the Woh Pehli Baar album
- TV appearances have included specials and soap operas including Navratri, Thodi Khushi Thode Gham, Music Masti Dhoom, Kyunki, Kis Desh Mein Hai Meraa Dil, Kitani Mohabbat Hai, K for Kishore and auditioning contestants in Bhopal for Indian Idol 3
- Recorded songs in Bengali (Doshomi), Haryanvi (Tera Mera Vaada), et al.
- Sang the song "Ek Duje Ke" from the TV series Yeh Rishta Kya Kehlata Hai
- Currently a judge on the Zee Bangla reality show, Sa Re Ga Ma Pa 2025

== Discography ==
=== Film songs ===
Denotes films that have not yet been released

Year	Film	Song	Music	Co-Singer(s)	Note
2007	Speed	"Loving You"	Pritam	Sonu Nigam	
2007	Jab We Met	"Yeh Ishq Haye – Remix"	Pritam	Shreya Ghoshal	
2009	Life Partner	"Kuke Kuke"	Pritam	Shaan	
2009	Life Partner	"Kuke Kuke" (remix)	Pritam	Shaan, Debojeet Dutta	
2009	Life Partner	"Aage Aage"	Pritam	Mika Singh	
2009	All the Best: Fun Begins	"All The Best"	Pritam	Soham Chakraborty	
2010	Toh Baat Pakki!	"Om Jai Jagadish Hare"	Pritam		
2010	Raajneeti	"Bheegi Si Bhaagi Si"	Pritam	Mohit Chauhan	
2010	Hello Darling	"Aa Jaane Jaan"	Pritam	Javed Jaffrey, Akriti Kakar	
2010	Action Replayy	"Tera Mera Pyar"	Pritam	Karthik	
2010	Golmaal 3	"Ale"	Pritam	Neeraj Shridhar	
2011	Dil Toh Baccha Hai Ji	"Beshuba"	Pritam	Kunal Ganjawala	
2011	Dil Toh Baccha Hai Ji	"Yeh Dil Hai Nakhrewala (Film version)"	Pritam		
2012	Ajab Gazabb Love	"Sun Soniye"	Sajid–Wajid	Mohammed Irfan	
2013	R... Rajkumar	"Saree Ke Fall Sa"	Pritam	Nakash Aziz	
2013	R... Rajkumar	"Kaddu Katega"	Pritam		
2013	Zindagi 50-50	"Zindagi 50 50 (Title Track)"	Amjad Nadeem	Bappi Lahiri	
2014	Yoddha: The Warrior	"Ebar Jeno Onno Rokom Pujo"	Indraadip Dasgupta	Nakash Aziz	Bengali Film
2015	Gangster	"Eshona Monta Amar (Duet)"	Jeet Gannguli	Rishi Chanda	Bengali Film
2015	Dilwale	"Gerua"	Pritam	Arijit Singh	
2015	Dilwale	"Manma Emotion Jaage"	Pritam	Amit Mishra, Anushka Manchanda	
2015	Dilwale	"Janam Janam"	Pritam	Arijit Singh	
2016	1920 London	"Gumnaam Hai Koi"	JAM8	Jubin Nautiyal	
2016	1920 London	"Aafreen"	JAM8	K.K	
2016	1920 London	"Aafreen (2nd version)"	JAM8	Sreeram	
2016	Mental	"Premta Toder Nesha"	Riddhi	Rishi Chanda	Bangladeshi film
2016	Azhar	"Itni Si Baat Hai"	Pritam	Arijit Singh	
2016	Dishoom	"Jaaneman Aah"	Pritam	Aman Trikha	
2016	Dishoom	"Ishqa"	Pritam	Abhijeet Sawant	
2016	Haripad Bandwala	"Shona"	Indraadip Dasgupta	Nakash Aziz	Bengali Film
2017	Ami Je Ke Tomar	"Eshe Gechi Kachakachi"	Indraadip Dasgupta	Arijit Singh	Bengali Film
2017	Chowka	"Turthinalli Geechida"	Sridhar V. Sambhram	Sonu Nigam	Kannada Film
2017	Munna Michael	"Ding Dang"	Javed-Mohsin	Amit Mishra	
2017	Rangbaz	"Rimjhim"	Dabbu	Mohammed Irfan	Bengali Film
2017	Mando Basar Galpo	"Ekta Shitkaal Ar Chadorer Mato Galpe"	Ashok Bhadra		Bengali Film
2018	Namaste England	"Dhoom Dhadaka"	Mannan Shaah	Shahid Mallya	
2018	Villain	"Shundori Komola"	JAM8	Armaan Malik	Bengali Film
2018	Bhaijaan Elo Re	"Baby Jaan"	Dolaan Mainnakk	Nakash Aziz	Bangladeshi film
2019	Kalank	"Aira Gaira"	Pritam	Javed Ali, Tushar Joshi, Akashdeep Sengupta	
2019	Kalank	"Aira Gaira (Extended)"	Pritam	Javed Ali, Tushar Joshi, Akashdeep Sengupta	
2019	Jaanbaaz	"Tui Je Aamar"	Dev Sen	Jubin Nautiyal	Bengali Film
2019	The Sky Is Pink	"Dil Hi Toh Hai"	Pritam	Arijit Singh, Nikhil D'Souza	
2019	The Sky Is Pink	"Dil Hi Toh Hai (2nd Version)"	Pritam	Sreerama Chandra, Nikhil D'Souza	
2019	Chhichhore	"Fikar Not"	Pritam	Nakash Aziz, Sreerama Chandra, Amit Mishra, Dev Negi, Amitabh Bhattacharya	
2019	Yeh Rishta Kya Kehlata Hai	"Ek Duje Ke"	Akashdeep Sengupta For JAM8	Akashdeep Sengupta	
2020	Nabab LLB	"Just Chill"	Dolaan Mainnakk	Supratip Bhattacharya	Bengali Film
2020	Love Aaj Kal	"Mehrama"	Pritam	Darshan Raval	
2020	Love Aaj Kal	"Meherama (Extended Version)"	Pritam	Darshan Raval	
2021	Pagglait	"Lamha" (Revisited)	Arijit Singh		
2021	Magic	"Mon Anmone"	Dabbu	Santanu Dey Sarkar	Bengali Film
2021	Star Jalsha Parivaar Award	"Star Jalsha Parivaar Award"(Theme Song)	Indraadip Dasgupta	Ishaan Mitra	Bengali Award Show
2022	Raavan	"Ami Tor"	Savvy	Javed Ali	Bengali Film
2022	Brahmāstra	"Kesariya (Film Version -- Hindi, Tamil, Telegu, Malayalam, Kannada)"	Pritam	Arijit Singh	
2022	Brahmāstra	"Kesariya (Dance Mix)"	Pritam	Shashwat Singh, Arijit Singh	
2022	Aay Khuku Aay	"Ebhabeo Preme Pora Jaay"	Ranojay Bhattacharjee		Bengali Film
2023	The Great Indian Family	"Sahibaa"	Pritam	Darshan Raval	
2023	Fatafati	Jani Okaron	Amit Chatterjee	Ishan Mitra	Bengali Film
2023	Nayika Devi - The Warrior Queen	"Keva Malya Re"	Parth Bharat Thakkar	Javed Ali	Gujarati Film
2023	Rocky Aur Rani Kii Prem Kahaani	"Kudmayi (Female)"	Pritam		
2024	Merry Christmas	"Raat Akeli Thi"	Pritam	Arijit Singh	
2024	5 No Swapnamay Lane	"5 No Swapnamay Lane Title Track"	Joy Sarkar		Bengali film
2024	Shastri	"Dhangkurakur Taak"	Ishan Mitra	Indraadip Dasgupta, Ishan Mitra	Bengali film
2024	Hangamadotcom	Tor E Sathe	Savvy	Sonu Nigam	Bengali film
2024	Khadaan	"Kishori"	Rathijit Bhattacharya		Bengali film
2025	Sikandar	"Bam Bam Bole"	Pritam	Shaan, Dev Negi	
2025	Metro... In Dino	"Ishq Ya Tharak"	Pritam	Aditya Roy Kapur, Shashwat Singh, Nikhita Gandhi	
2025	Shreeman vs Shreemati	"Mon Kharap"	Indradip Dasgupta	Sonu Nigam	Bengali film
2025	Grihapravesh	"Saiyaan Bina"	Indradip Dasgupta	Armaan Rashid Khan	Bengali film
2025	Bahurup	"Hariye Jai"	Arpita Abhishek	Kunal Ganjawala	Bengali film
2025	Police	"Aalto Prem"	Dabbu	Raj Barman	Bengali film
2025	Police	"Haathe Harricane"	Dabbu		Bengali film
2025	Haati Haati Paa Paa	"Priyo Mukh"	Ranajoy Bhattacharjee		Bengali film
2025	Sunny Sanskari Ki Tulsi Kumari	"Ishq Manzoor"	A.P.S	Amit Mishra, Nakash Aziz, Shreya Ghoshal	
2026	Bhooth Bangla	"O Sundari"	Pritam	Vishal Mishra, Nakash Aziz	
2026	Abhhiman	"Ke Tumi"	Indradip Dasgupta	Papon	Bengali Film
2026	Gun Gun Kore Mohua	"Bodhua (Title Track)"	Saptak Sanai Das	Amit Kumar	Bengali Film

=== Non-film songs ===
Year	Song	Music	Co-Singer(s)	Note
2018	"Esati Osinaki"	Anurag Saikia	Dikshu Sarma	Assamese
2020	"Tu Mera"	Rashid Khan	Altamash Faridi	Hindi
2021	"Tum Jo Aaye"	Shashwat Dixit	Shashwat Dixit	Hindi
2021	"Raanjhana Ve"	Uddipan Sharma	Soham Naik	Hindi
2022	"Chupke Chupke"	Shubham Sundaram		Hindi
2023	"Ho Nahin Sakta"	Uddipan Sharma	Soham Naik	Hindi
2023	"Soneya Sajna"	Ali Ghani	Shekhar Khanijo	Punjabi
2024	"Dil Sajeya"	Neeru Mehta, Mriganka Bhattacharjya		Hindi
2024	"Dil Mera"	Sanjoy Deb, Kanika Kapoor	Vicky Sandhu, Kanika Kapoor	Hindi
2024	"Chup Chup Chup"	Mann	Sonu Nigam	Hindi
2024	"Mere to Girdhar Gopal"			Hindi
2024	"Rimjhim Rimjhim Brishtira"	Rangon	Abhay Jodhpurkar	Bengali
2024	"Tor E Sathe"	Savvy	Sonu Nigam	Bengali
2024	"Khela Ghor Bhandhte Legechi"	Rahul Tiwari		Bengali
2024	"Cham Cham Karti Baarish"	Rangon	Abhay Jodhpurkar	Hindi
2024	"Sab Kuch Mera"	Mann		Hindi
2024	"Sab Kuch Mera"	Mann		Hindi
2025	"Zindagi Nu Pyaar Ve"	Krishnendu Raj Acharya		Hindi

== Awards ==
Year	Award	Category	Film	Song	Result	Ref.
2010	Mirchi Music Awards	Upcoming Female Vocalist of The Year	Raajneeti	"Bheegi Si Bhaagi Si"	Nominated	
2010	Zee Cine Awards	Best Playback Singer – Female	Raajneeti	"Bheegi Si Bhaagi Si"	Nominated	
2016	GiMA Awards	Best Film Song	Dilwale	"Gerua"	Won	
2016	Mirchi Music Awards	Best Female Vocalist	Dilwale	"Gerua"	Won	
2016	Bollywood Hungama Surfers' Choice Music Awards	Best Film Song	Dilwale	"Gerua"	Won	
2016	Bollywood Hungama Surfers' Choice Music Awards	Best Playback Singer - Female	Dilwale	"Gerua"	Nominated	
2016	ABP Ananda Sera Bangali (Music) Award	Sera Bangali (Music)	Dilwale	"Gerua", "Janam Janam"	Won	
2021	66th Filmfare Awards	Best Female Playback Singer	Love Aaj Kal	"Mehrama"	Nominated	
2023	Mirchi Music Awards	Listeners' Choice Album of the Year	Brahmāstra: Part One – Shiva	"Kesariya"	Nominated	
2023	Mirchi Music Awards	Critics' Award for Album of the Year	Brahmāstra: Part One – Shiva	"Kesariya"	Nominated	
2025	WBFJA Cinemar Somabarton	Best Female Singer	Khadaan	"Kishori"	Won	
2025	Anandalok Puraskar	Best Singer (Female)	Khadaan	"Kishori"	Won	
2025	8th Filmfare Awards Bangla	Best Playback Singer-Female Singer	Khadaan	"Kishori"	Nominated	
2026	Zee 24 Ghanta Binodon Shera 24	Best Playback Singer - Female	Grihapravesh	"Saiyaan Bina"	Nominated	
