= Janhit Mein Jaari =

2022 Indian film by Jai Basantu Singh

- Theatrical release poster
- Directed by: Jai Basantu Singh
- Written by: Raaj Shaandilyaa; Shaan Yadav
- Screenplay by: Jai Basantu Singh; Raaj Shaandilyaa; Rajan Agarwal; Sonali Singh
- Produced by: Raaj Shaandilyaa; Vinod Bhanushali; Vimal Lahoti; Kamlesh Bhanushali; Vishal Gurnani; Shradha Chandavarkar
- Starring: Nushrratt Bharuccha; Paritosh Tripathi; Shaan Yadav; Vijay Raaz; Brijendra Kala; Anud Singh Dhaka; Tinu Anand
- Cinematography: Chirantan Das
- Edited by: Jayant Verma; Jai Basantu Singh
- Music by: Aman Pant
- Production companies: Thinkink Picturez; Bhanushali Studios Limited; Shree Raghav Entertainment; Take 9 Entertainment
- Distributed by: Zee Studios
- Release date: 10 June 2022
- Running time: 146 minutes
- Country: India
- Language: Hindi
- Budget: ₹12 crore
- Box office: est. ₹5.12 crore

Janhit Mein Jaari (transl. Issued in public interest) is a 2022 Indian Hindi-language comedy-drama film directed by Jai Basantu Singh and written by Raaj Shaandilyaa. It stars Nushrat Bharucha, Paritosh Tripathi, and Vijay Raaz among others.

It was released theatrically on 10 June 2022 and later premiered on video on demand on ZEE5 from 15 July 2022. It received mixed-to-positive reviews from critics and the audience, with praise for the message, humour and performances.

== Plot ==
Manokamna "Mannu" Tripathi (Nushrratt Bharuccha) is an ambitious and smart girl who lives with her parents, two younger sisters and a younger brother. She is adored by her childhood friend Devi, who is in love with her but never expresses it in front of her. To escape the pressure from her family to get married, Mannu takes a high-paying job as a sales executive at a condom manufacturing factory, which Devi joins later. She excels at her job despite the hurdles. She soon meets and falls in love with Ranjan Prajapati, a freelance nautanki artist who lives in a joint family led by his overbearing father, Keval Prajapati.

Mannu and Ranjan bribe the Pandit to make their matrimonial alliance seem an arranged marriage as Keval is against love marriage. After the wedding, Ranjan's family finds out the true nature of Mannu's work and forces her to quit the job. Mannu starts selling plastic boxes; one of her colleagues undergoes abortion, as decided by the village's Nyaya panchayat, and dies of infection. This shocks Mannu who decides to return to her previous job and use it as a means to create awareness for safe sex, as it's only women who suffer the emotional, physical and mental consequences. Her father-in-law, who is contesting municipality elections, summons her parents and asks Mannu to a divorce. Mannu confronts Ranjan for not standing up for her and willing to divorce her despite his love for her and only to please his father. Ranjan promises to stand up to his father. The family court gives the couple six months to reconcile their differences before finalising divorce.

Mannu is determined to create awareness among women. She appears in a TV advertisement to promote the use of condoms as protection during sex, as opposed to the previous marketing strategy where it was sold as pleasure for men. She is approached by a misogynistic news reporter and she responds truthfully. The interview and ad become talk of the town, much to the chagrin of her father-in-law. On the election day, when he wins the election, he is told that his victory is in fact public support for Mannu. He walks away from the ceremony and throws Ranjan and Mannu out of the house when Ranjan refuses to sign the divorce papers. Ranjan's sister goes into labour. At the hospital, the doctor scolds her husband for impregnating her child following two miscarriages. Hearing his daughter's life is in danger, Keval asks his son-in-law, why he did not use condoms for protection. His father, Dadaji, points out that Mannu was trying to teach the same, but Keval could not accept that. Later doctor announces that the mother and child are safe and out of danger. Keval, after realising his mistake accepts Mannu's job and welcomes her back in the family. The movie ends with Mannu breaking the fourth wall - addressing the audience to be responsible by using protection.

== Cast ==
- Nushrratt Bharuccha as Manokamna "Mannu" Tripathi
- Vijay Raaz as Keval Prajapati
- Tinnu Anand as Keval's father
- Anud Singh Dhaka as Ranjan
- Brijendra Kala
- Ishtiyak Khan as Mannu's father
- Sapna Sand as Mannu's mother
- Vikram Kochhar
- Ishan Mishra as Achaanak Kumar
- Paritosh Tripathi as Devi
- Shaan Yadav as Maqdoom
- Sukriti Gupta as Babli, Ranjan's sister-in-law
- Neha Saraf as Ranjan's sister-in-law
- Amit Jaat as Girish
- Satyam Aarakh
- Jyoti Dubey
- Aashi Malviya
- Mohit Shewani
- Gaurav Bajpayee
- Deepak Rai
- Sahiil Sagar

== Production ==
=== Development ===
The film, starring Nushrratt Bharuccha, was announced by Indian boxer Mary Kom in November 2021.

=== Filming ===
Principal photography of the film started in mid-September 2021 in Gwalior, Madhya Pradesh. However production was halted in November 2021 owing to COVID-19 pandemic in India. The filming wrapped up on 17 December 2021 in Chanderi, Madhya Pradesh.

== Release ==
=== Theatrical ===
Janhit Mein Jaari was released theatrically on 10 June 2022. It earned ₹43 lakhs at the domestic box office on its opening day. On the second day, the film collected ₹82 lakhs. On the third day, the film collected ₹94 lakhs, taking total domestic weekend collection to ₹2.19 crore.

As of 13 June 2022, the film grossed ₹2.50 crore in India.

=== Home media ===
The digital streaming rights of the film are owned by ZEE5. The film became available digitally on ZEE5 on 15 July 2022.

== Soundtrack ==
Janhit Mein Jaari

Soundtrack album by Prini Siddhant Madhav, Amol - Abhishek and Sadhu Sushil Tiwari
- Released: 23 May 2022
- Recorded: 2021
- Genre: Feature film soundtrack
- Length: 26:29
- Language: Hindi
- Label: Hitz Music

Official audio
- Janhit Mein Jaari - Full Album on YouTube

The music of the film was composed by Prini Siddhant Madhav, Amol - Abhishek and Sadhu Sushil Tiwari with lyrics written by Sameer Anjaan, Abhishek Talented, Raaj Shaandilyaa, Niket Pandey, Tiwari and Rohit Sharma.

On 12 May 2022, the first song titled "Parda Daari" sung by Javed Ali and Dhvani Bhanushali was unveiled.

Track listing
No.	Title	Lyrics	Music	Singer(s)	Length
1.	"Parda Daari"	Sameer Anjaan	Prini Siddhant Madhav	Javed Ali, Dhvani Bhanushali	4:52
2.	"Udaa Gulaal Ishq Wala"	Abhishek Talented	Amol - Abhishek	Amit Gupta, Dhvani Bhanushali	3:58
3.	"Tenu Aunda Nahi"	Kunwar Juneja	Prini Siddhant Madhav	Prini Siddhant Madhav	3:52
4.	"Janhit Mein Jaari - Title Track"	Raaj Shaandilyaa	Prini Siddhant Madhav	Raftaar, Nakash Aziz	3:01
5.	"Chali Re Bazaar"	Niket Pandey, Sadhu Sushil Tiwari	Sadhu Sushil Tiwari	Asees Kaur	5:44
6.	"Ishq Ho Jaane De"	Rohit Sharma	Sadhu Sushil Tiwari	Tushar Joshi	5:02
Total length:					26:30

== Reception ==
=== Critical reception ===
Janhit Mein Jaari received mixed to positive reviews from critics. On the review aggregator website Rotten Tomatoes, 25% of 8 critics' reviews are positive, with an average rating of 5.8/10.

Rachana Dubey of The Times of India gave it three and a half stars out of five and found it to be a "punch-line heavy discussion on safe sex".

Akash Bhatnagar from Bollywood Bubble gave three and a half stars out of five and wrote, "Janhit Mein Jaari is a good and entertaining film. Nushrratt being the one with the most star-power here delivers to her promise. It's a good, clean film and deserves at least one viewing with the whole family."
