= Mukhya Gamanika =

- Theatrical release poster
- Directed by: Venu Muralidhar Vadnala
- Written by: Venu Muralidhar Vadnala
- Produced by: Rajashekar Lokam; Saikrishna Lokam
- Starring: Viran Muttamsetty; Lavannya Sahukara
- Cinematography: Venu Muralidhar Vadnala
- Edited by: Shiva Sarvani
- Music by: Kiran Venna
- Production company: Shivin Productions
- Release date: 23 February 2024
- Running time: 125 minutes
- Country: India
- Language: Telugu

Mukhya Gamanika is a 2024 Indian Telugu-language crime thriller film written and directed by Venu Muralidhar Vadnala. The film features Viran Muttamsetty and Lavannya Sahukara in lead roles. It was released in theatres on 23 February 2024.

== Cast ==
- Viran Muttamsetty
- Lavannya Sahukara
- Aryan Ippili

== Production ==
The film was announced in January 2024. The post-production of the film was completed in January 2024.

== Music ==
Mukhya Gamanika

Soundtrack album by Kiran Venna
- Released: 26 December 2023
- Genre: Feature film soundtrack
- Length: 4:42
- Language: Telugu
- Label: Madhura Audio

Track listing
No.	Title	Singer(s)	Length
1.	"Aa Kannula Chupullonaa"	Nakash Aziz, Revati Srita	4:42
Total length:			4:42

== Reception ==
A critic of News18 and Suhas Sistu of The Hans India reviewed the film.
