= Bhaijaan Elo Re =

2018 Indian film by Joydeep Mukherjee

- Official poster
- Directed by: Joydip Mukherjee
- Screenplay by: Pele Bhattacharya; Joydip Mukherjee
- Produced by: Ashok Dhanuka; Himanshu Dhanuka
- Starring: Shakib Khan; Srabanti Chatterjee; Payel Sarkar; Rajatabha Dutta; Shantilal Mukherjee; Saruar Abedin
- Edited by: Rabiranjan Moitra
- Music by: Savvy; Dolaan Maainnakk
- Production company: FB Ltd Productions
- Distributed by: Eskay Movies
- Release date: 15 June 2018
- Country: India
- Language: Bengali

Bhaijaan Elo Re (transl. Dear Brother is Coming) is a 2018 Indian Bangla-language action comedy film directed by Joydip Mukherjee. A remake of Ranjit Mallick starrer 1982 film Shathe Shathyang, film stars Shakib Khan and Srabanti Chatterjee and Payel Sarkar in the lead roles. The cast also includes Rajatabha Dutta, Shantilal Mukherjee, Shahed Ali, Monira Mithu, Saruar Abedin and Deepa Khandakar. The film is produced by FB Ltd Productions.

The film marks the fourth collaboration between Shakib Khan and director Joydeep Mukherjee and also the second collaboration between Khan and actress Srabanti after the film Shikari, which was directed by Mukherjee.

== Plot ==
Separated at birth, after 28 years Bhai and Jaan grow up to be as different from each other as can be. While Bhai is outspoken and a little bit of a troublemaker a daring costume designer, Jaan is quite shy and timid. After years of being apart, fate brings the two brothers together, and things take an interesting turn from this point.

== Cast ==
- Shakib Khan as Ajaan/Ujaan
- Srabanti Chatterjee as Hiya
- Payel Sarkar as Runa
- Rajatava Dutta as Hiya's Father
- Deepa Khandakar as Ajaan and Ujaan's Didi
- Monira Mithu as Shanti
- Shantilal Mukherjee as Sudhir Mukharjee
- Biswanath Basu as Ajaan's friend
- Mridul Sen
- Sourav Ghosh
- Chitrabhanu Basu
- Donna Preston
- Sukanya Bhattacharya
- Kiriti Karjilal
- Jayanta Hore
- Amitabh Bhattacharya as Doctor
- Poltu Polle
- Somor Pal
- Anindo Sarkar
- Dola Chakraborty
- Nibedita Bagchi
- Barun Chakraborty
- Sudip Mitra
- Mousumi Saha
- Lee Nicholas Harris as Police officer
- Richard Banks as Police officer 3
- Olga Savic as Plane Passenger
- Iman Zand as Police officer 2
- Romel Onuoha as Mugger

== Production ==
The film was shot in Kolkata, West Bengal and in the United Kingdom.

== Soundtrack ==
Bhaijaan Elo Re

Soundtrack album by Savvy Gupta & Dolaan Maainnakk
- Released: 2018
- Genre: Soundtrack
- Label: Eskay Movies
- Producer: Savvy Gupta

Savvy Gupta & Dolaan Maainnakk chronology
Chaalbaaz (2018)	Bhaijaan Elo Re (2018)

Dolaan Maainnakk chronology
Kuheli (2016)	Bhaijaan Elo Re (2018)

The soundtrack of Bhaijaan Elo Re is composed by Savvy & Dolaan Mainnakk. The first song from the soundtrack, "Baby Jaan", is sung by Nakash Aziz & Antara Mitra. The music video of "Baby Jaan" received an overwhelming response on YouTube, creating a record of becoming the fastest Bengali language music video to reach 1 million (10 lakh) views within 24 Hours. The second song from the soundtrack, "Tor Naam", also became popular among audiences in Bangladesh and West Bengal. The title track has been sung by popular Bollywood singer Abhijeet Bhattacharya.

=== Track listing ===
No.	Title	Lyrics	Music	Singer(s)	Length
1.	"Baby Jaan"	Dolaan Maainnakk	Dolaan Maainnakk	Nakash Aziz & Antara Mitra	3:30
2.	"Likhechhi Tor Nam"	Dolaan Maainnakk	Dolaan Maainnakk	Raj Burman	3:48
3.	"Bhaijaan Eid E Elo Re (Title Song)"	Rajiv Dutta	Savvy	Abhijeet Bhattacharya	3:32
4.	"Hati Hati Paye Paye"	Dolan Mainaak	Dolan Mainaak	Shaan & Madhuraa Bhattacharya	3:24

Notes

- "Baby Jaan" is programmed by Dolaan Maainnakk, mixed and mastered by Subhadeep Mitra, and features guitars played by Shomu Seal.
- "Tor Naam" is programmed by Dolaan Mainnakk, mixed and mastered by Subhadeep Mitra, and features guitars played by Raja Choudhury and additional vocals by Kinjal Chattopadhyay.
- "Bhaijaan Eid E Elo Re" is programmed by Praveen Paul, mixed and mastered by Subhadeep Mitra, and features guitars played by Somu Seal.
