= Baby Jaan =

Bengali film song

- YouTube thumbnail for the music video, featured Shakib Khan and actress Srabanti Chatterjee and Payel Sarkar.

Single by Dolaan-Mainnakk featuring Nakash Aziz and Antara Mitra

from the album Bhaijaan Elo Re (Original Motion Picture Soundtrack)
- Language: Bengali
- Released: 12 May 2018
- Genre: Soundtrack; Latin; World
- Length: 3:30 (video)
- Label: Eskay Movies
- Songwriter: Dolaan-Mainnakk
- Producer: Dolaan-Mainnakk

Music video
- "Baby Jaan" on YouTube

"Baby Jaan" (transl. Baby dear) is a Bengali song from the 2018 Indian romantic drama film, Bhaijaan Elo Re. Written and produced by Dolaan-Mainnakk, the song is sung by Nakash Aziz and Antara Mitra. The music video of the track features Shakib Khan, Srabanti Chatterjee and Payel Sarkar. The music video is choreographed by Adil Sheikh and edited by Ravi Ranjan Moitra.

== Release and response ==
The song was released on 12 May 2018 in the banner of Eskay Music. The song performed by Nakash Aziz and Antara Mitra. The track featured Shakib Khan and actress Srabanti Chatterjee and Payel Sarkar. The music video was shot in West Bengal and some exotic locations in London. The video received an overwhelming response on YouTube and creating record of becoming the fastest Bengali language video track to reach 1 million (10 Lac) views within 24 Hours.
