= 72 Hours: Martyr Who Never Died =

2019 Indian biographical drama film directed by Avinash Dhyani

- Official poster
- Directed by: Avinash Dhyani
- Written by: Avinash Dhyani
- Screenplay by: Avinash Dhyani
- Produced by: JS Rawat; Tarun Singh Rawat; Prashil Rawat
- Starring: Avinash Dhyani; Mukesh Tiwari; Virendra Saxena; Alka Amin; Shishir Sharma; Gireesh Sahdev; Prashil Rawat
- Cinematography: Harish Negi
- Edited by: Ajay Verma
- Music by: Sunjoy Bose; Background score: Aslam Keyi
- Production company: JSR Production House
- Release date: January 18, 2019
- Running time: 130 minutes
- Country: India
- Language: Hindi

72 Hours: Martyr Who Never Died is a 2019 Indian biographical drama film directed by Avinash Dhyani. The story is based on the life and times of rifleman Jaswant Singh Rawat, who fought against the encroaching Chinese army during the 1962 Sino-Indian War. The film got positive reviews from both audience and critics.

== Plot ==
Following the biography of Jaswant Singh Rawat, this movie is set in the 1960s, when apart from economic instability, famine, and communal tension, India was ill-prepared for the 1962 Sino-Indian War. Jaswant was born in an impecunious Garhwali Rajput family in Garhwal, Dehradun, Uttarakhand. He grew up to be a responsible son, devoting his life towards study and family, but due to several incidents, he decided to join the army as a young man and received his training at Garhwal in Pauri Garhwal District and enlisted under the Garhwal Rifles Regiment. Shortly after his training, their paltan (platoon) is sent to defend from the encroaching Chinese army from the northeastern front. Due to adverse circumstances and setbacks, the infantry has to step back. However, Rifleman Jaswant Singh Rawat refuses to leave and fights against the Chinese army alone for 72 hours.

== Cast ==
- Avinash Dhyani as Rifleman Jaswant Singh Rawat
- Mukesh Tiwari as Hawaldar CM Singh Gusain
- Virendra Saxena as Shri. Guman Rawat
- Alka Amin as Leela Rawat
- Shishir Sharma as Col. S. N. Tandon
- Gireesh Sahdev as Company Commander Sher Singh
- Prashil Rawat as Rifleman Jeet Singh
- Abhishek Maindola as Nayak Laali Chaman
- Ishtiaaq Khan as Rifleman Darbaan Singh
- Sumit Gulati as Rifleman Trilok Singh Negi
- Yeshi Dema as Noora
- Naman Tiwari as Young Jaswant Singh Rawat
- Suraj Dholakhandi as Rifleman Leela Singh Rawat
- Unknown as Ram Gopal Singh

== Previews ==
The first-look poster of the movie was released on 26 November 2018. An official teaser was published on 17 December 2018. The official trailer was released on 24 December 2018.

== Soundtrack ==
72 Hours: Martyr Who Never Died

Soundtrack album by Sunjoy Bose
- Released: 18 January 2019
- Recorded: 2018
- Genre: Feature Film Soundtrack
- Length: 32:46
- Label: T-Series
External audio
- Audio Jukebox on YouTube

The film's soundtrack was composed by Sunjoy Bose and lyrics were penned by Vikas Chauhan, Seema Saini, Ashish Chaterjee, Sujata Devrani and Nishant Mishra.

| No. | Title | Lyrics | Singer(s) | Length |
|---|---|---|---|---|
| 1. | "Sau Jahan" | Vikas Chauhan | Shaan | 3:47 |
| 2. | "Vandemataram" | Ashish Chatterjee | Sukhwinder Singh, Anupriya Chatterjee | 6:24 |
| 3. | "Tum Bepanah" | Sujata Devrari, Vikas Chauhan | Mohit Chauhan, Priyanka Negi | 5:19 |
| 4. | "Door" | Seema Saini | Shaan | 4:23 |
| 5. | "Ab toh Chal Padhe" | Nishant Mishra | Shaan, Sunjoy Bose | 4:20 |
| 6. | "Ore Chanda" | Seema Saini | Shreya Ghoshal, Sunjoy Bose | 4:58 |
| 7. | "Sau Jahan" (Reprise) | Vikas Chauhan | Mohit Mishra | 3:48 |
| Total length: | | | | 32:46 |
