= Vicky Vidya Ka Woh Wala Video =

2024 Indian film by Raaj Shaandilyaa

- Theatrical release poster
- Directed by: Raaj Shaandilyaa
- Written by: Raaj Shaandilyaa
- Screenplay by: Raaj Shaandilyaa; Yusuf Ali Khan; Ishrat Khan; Rajan Agarwal
- Story by: Raaj Shaandilyaa; Yusuf Ali Khan
- Produced by: Bhushan Kumar; Krishan Kumar; Ekta Kapoor; Shobha Kapoor; Vipul D. Shah; Ashwin Varde; Rajesh Bahl; Raaj Shaandilyaa; Vimal Lahoti
- Starring: Rajkummar Rao; Triptii Dimri
- Cinematography: Aseem Mishra
- Edited by: Prakash Chandra Sahoo
- Music by: Songs: Sachin–Jigar; White Noise Collectives; Score: Hitesh Sonik
- Production companies: T-Series Films; Balaji Motion Pictures; Wakaoo Films; Kathavachak Films
- Distributed by: AA Films
- Release date: 11 October 2024
- Running time: 146 minutes
- Country: India
- Language: Hindi
- Box office: est. ₹55.51 crore

Vicky Vidya Ka Woh Wala Video (Note: The name literally translates as "That video of Vicky and Vidya". However it has completely different connotations. In more formal "euphemistic" language "woh" often refers to "romantic" or "sexual"; as when a girl says, "tum bade woh ho" (you are too romantic). Here the "woh wala video" refers to the "sexually explicit video" which the protagonist couple makes on their wedding's first night) is a 2024 Indian Hindi-language comedy film starring Rajkummar Rao and Triptii Dimri as the titular couple in pursuit of their missing sex tape. It is co-written and directed by Raaj Shaandilyaa and produced by T-Series Films, Balaji Motion Pictures, Wakaoo Films and Kathavachak Films. The film released on 11 October 2024 to negative reviews from critics.

== Plot ==
In 1997 in Rishikesh, Vidya, a doctor, calls off her arranged marriage and instead tricks her parents into letting her marry her childhood sweetheart, Vicky, a mehendi artist. For their honeymoon, they visit Goa, where Vicky convinces Vidya to record their first night together. After they return, they insert a disc containing the video into their CD player and fall asleep while watching the video. At night, their home is burglarized, and most valuables are stolen, including the CD player and the family's ancestral sword. Vicky lies to Vidya about the disc, saying that he had removed it before falling asleep.

Inspector Laadle arrives to investigate the incident and immediately falls in love with Chanda, Vicky's promiscuous but gamophobic sister, which becomes the cause of frequent confusion to the family's naive and bitter maid, also named Chanda. Laadle is terrible at his job and focuses his attention on wooing Chanda instead. Vicky, meanwhile, visits a shady dealer of illicit videotapes but fails to find the disc. He eventually learns about a local flea market where he meets Badshah, the burglar, but doesn't recognize him. Vidya tries to initiate sex and asks Vicky to play the tape again, causing him to run away to avoid telling her the truth, causing Vidya to get suspicious. The following day, a friend alerts Vicky that their ancestral sword was found with a tourist from Zimbabwe, who reveals she got it from the flea market and leads him to Chaabiwale Chacha, Badshah's business partner. Vicky intimidates Chaabiwale Chacha into revealing the location of Badshah. Meanwhile, a suspicious Vidya follows and sees Vicky with the tourist, and is convinced he is cheating on her.

Vicky finds a comatose Badshah in his hotel room along with the CD player he stole, but the disc is later revealed to have been removed. Laadle arrives, causing Vicky to flee out of the window using the scaffolding. He is eventually caught and sent to jail, where he reveals the truth about the CD to a horrified Vidya. Chaabiwale Chacha helps Vicky escape, who goes home and tries to apologize to Vidya, but she tearfully tells him never to speak to her again. A heartbroken Vicky tries to commit suicide by jumping in front of a train, but Vidya saves him at the last moment, and they reconcile, vowing to solve the issue together. Bulbul didi, a local godwoman, and her idiotic henchmen Sunil and Shetty are revealed to be the ones who left Badshah for dead and stole the disc from his hotel room. They call Vicky's landline to extort him for 2 Lakh rupees in exchange for the disc. Vidya gets the message, but the call is also overheard by Vicky's grandfather and sister, both of whom think the sex tape involves them. Meanwhile, after hearing Badshah is recovering, Bulbul sends Sunil and Shetty to kill him at the hospital, causing Badshah to hide inside the morgue.

Vicky and Vidya break into her parents' house to get the money but only find a stash of gutka inside the safe, while Chanda convinces Laadle to give her 2 lakhs. Laadle agrees but offers to come with her to catch the blackmailers instead. Vicky and Vidya return home and accidentally reveal the truth to his grandfather, who assumes the tape involves him and the maid, and gives them 2 lakhs he had borrowed after overhearing the call. Bulbul, Sunil, and Shetty arrive at a graveyard for the exchange. Vicky and Vidya also arrive, as do Laadle and Chanda, both parties being unaware of each other. A funeral procession for a Cristiano D'Costa (CD) arrives with Badshah inside the coffin due to his toe tag, and a bumbling Sunil drops the CD into the grave, causing everyone to arrive and demand that 'CD' be dug up. Badshah breaks out of the coffin, terrifying everyone and causing them to run away. Vicky and Vidya retrieve the disc while Laadle arrests Badshah, Bulbul, Sunil, and Shetty.

Vicky and Vidya play the tape but are shocked to find out it is a different video of them on their wedding night, while Badshah reveals to Laadle that he got the tape from a car he stole. The car belongs to Pardesi, the idiotic brother-in-law of Sajjan Kumar, a local leader. When apprehended, Pardesi reveals that Sajjan Kumar organizes community weddings under the guise of charity, offers them free lodging at his farmhouse for the night, and later records the couples and sells the videos to a Sheikh from Dubai. He also reveals that no one has seen his face before, but he'd be arriving in person for the next event. Laadle intercepts the Sheikh's car and takes his place while Sajjan finds out that his daughter Swati is among the people who got married in the ceremony. A horrified Sajjan begs Vicky to find Swati before it's too late, but the 'Sheikh' runs away with the CD to the audience gathered outside. They play the video in front of everyone despite Sajjan's protests, and it is revealed that Swati was in on the plan, who then proceeds to expose Sajjan in front of everyone.

Vicky and Vidya keep searching for the Goa tape. Vicky's little brother eventually finds it under Vicky's bed, as it is revealed that it had slipped out during the initial burglary. As Vidya rushes to snatch it, the kid throws it away, causing it to land on a passing minitruck playing religious songs and carrying an idol of the goddess Durga, as a horrified Vicky and Vidya give chase, hinting towards a sequel.

== Cast ==
- Rajkummar Rao as Vicky Babla, Vidya's husband
- Triptii Dimri as Dr. Vidya Babla, Vicky's wife
- Vijay Raaz as Police officer Laadle
- Mallika Sherawat as Chanda Rani
- Mast Ali as Badshah
- Archana Puran Singh as Vidya's mother
- Mukesh Tiwari as Sajjan Kumar
- Saharsh Kumar Shukla as Pardesi
- Archana Patel as Chanda the maid
- Rakesh Bedi as Vidya's father
- Tiku Talsania as Tikaram Babla, Vicky's grand father
- Ashwini Kalsekar as Bulbul Didi
- Mubeen Saudagar as Sunil
- Jaswant Singh Rathore as Shetty
- Ishtiyak Khan as Chaabiwale Chacha
- Manjot Singh as a Lawyer
- Harish Arya as a BD Costa
- Shehnaaz Gill as Chameli, special appearance in the song "Sajna Ve Sajna"
- Daler Mehndi as himself in the song "Na Na Na Na Na Re"
- Pawan Singh as himself in the song "Chumma"

== Production ==
The film was announced in September 2023. Principal photography commenced by January 2024. The film was mainly shot in Rishikesh before wrapping up in April 2024.

== Music ==
Vicky Vidya Ka Woh Wala Video

Soundtrack album by Sachin–Jigar and White Noise Collectives
- Released: 10 October 2024
- Genre: Feature film soundtrack
- Length: 36:07
- Language: Hindi
- Label: T-Series

Official audio
- Vicky Vidya Ka Woh Wala Video (Audio Jukebox) on YouTube

The film's soundtrack is composed by Sachin–Jigar with background score by Hitesh Sonik. The song "Sajna Ve Sajna," from the 2004 film Chameli, sung by Sunidhi Chauhan is recreated for the film. The song "Na Na Na Na Re" by Daler Mehndi from the 1997 film Mrityudata is also recreated for the film. The first single titled "Tum Jo Mile Ho" was released on 19 September 2024. The second single titled "Mere Mehboob" was released on 23 September 2024. The third single titled "Mushkil Hai" was released on 1 October 2024. The fourth single titled "Chumma" was released on 5 October 2024. The fifth single titled "Sajna Ve Sajna" was released on 7 October 2024.

Track listing
No.	Title	Lyrics	Singer(s)	Length
1.	"Tum Jo Mile Ho"	Priya Saraiya	Vishal Mishra, Sachin-Jigar	4:05
2.	"Mere Mehboob"	Priya Saraiya	Shilpa Rao, Sachet Tandon	3:36
3.	"Mushkil Hai"	Som	Vishal Mishra, Hansika Pareek, Sachin-Jigar	4:03
4.	"Chumma"	Vayu	Pawan Singh, Rupali Jagga, Rupesh Mishra, Mansa Jimmy, Sachin-Jigar	2:46
5.	"Marjaaniya"	Priya Saraiya	Varun Jain, Sachin-Jigar	4:09
6.	"Sajna Ve Sajna" (Music by White Noise Collectives)	Irshad Kamil	Sunidhi Chauhan, Divya Kumar	3:04
7.	"Marjaaniya 2"	Priya Saraiya	Raghav Chaitanya, Sachin-Jigar	4:09
8.	"Na Na Na Na Na Re" (Music by White Noise Collectives)	Sameer Anjaan	Daler Mehndi, Gurdeep Mehndi	4:10
9.	"Marjaaniya 3"	Priya Saraiya	Soumyadeep, Sachin-Jigar	4:09
10.	"Tumhe Apna Banane" (Music by White Noise Collectives)	Sameer Anjaan, Surendra Sathi, Rani Mallik	Anuradha Paudwal, Kumar Sanu	1:56
Total length:				36:07

== Release ==
=== Theatrical ===
The film was theatrically released on 11 October 2024.

=== Home media ===
The film began streaming on Netflix from 7 December 2024.

== Reception ==
=== Critical response ===
Vicky Vidya Ka Woh Wala Video received negative reviews from critics. On the review aggregator website Rotten Tomatoes, 10% of 10 critics' reviews are positive, with an average rating of 3.40/10. It received mixed reviews from audiences.

Saibal Chatterjee of NDTV gave it 1 star out of 5 and said, "It is a comedy that groans and croaks under the unbearable lightness of its unabashed silliness." Shubhra Gupta of The Indian Express gave 1.5 stars and criticised the screenplay saying that "the comedy film has exactly five lines that make you chuckle."

Sukanya Verma of rediff.com rated the film 1.5/5 stars and wrote in her review that "Between tons of sexual innuendo and Kapil Sharma brand of slapstick gags characterised in loud caricatures, moronic behaviour, flimsy wigs and cartoonish rhythm, Vicky Vidya Ka Woh Wala Video's jarring notions of exuberance have nothing novel to offer". Rating the film with 2/5 stars, Dishya Sharma of News18 criticised the lead actors chemistry and wrote the film "suffers from weak writing, with the plot and screenplay all over the place". Aishwarya Vasudevan of OTTPlay gave 2/5 stars and wrote the film "is a throwback to 90s comedy, but it delivers diminishing returns with outdated humour and missed opportunities."

Vinamra Mathur of Firstpost rated the film 1.5/5 stars and wrote "The film has no reason to exist in the 90s. It could be a film about a couple whose video goes viral on social media. But then, the makers felt hunting for a CD would make for a far more entertaining crowd pleaser". Bhavna Agarwal of India Today gave 1.5/5 stars and wrote "The screenplay is as mediocre as it can get, with the writing ranging between poor and very poor. What started seeming like a 90s parody in the first half soon became a yawn fest in the second, with the last 15 minutes adding a tinge of melodrama that no one asked for." Renuka Vyavahare of The Times of India gave 2.5 stars out of 5 and said that "It tries too hard to be funny, nostalgic (90s songs are inserted repeatedly) and moralistic but the climax gets way too bizarre for your liking. The film suddenly shifts gear and gets into an activism mode before resorting to horror comedy. Two mimics parading as Suniel Shetty serve as the final nail in the coffin." Anuj Kumar of The Hindu said in his review that "Promising to be a laugh riot, Raaj Shaandilyaa’s bouquet of comic characters doesn’t bloom to its potential". Rishabh Suri of Hindustan Times observes that "A fun first half where every joke lands is ruined by a boring second half that irritates you."

=== Box office ===
Vicky Vidya Ka Woh Wala Video two–weeks collection is ₹55.51 crore worldwide. It underperformed commercially.
