= Fredrick (film) =

- Directed by: Rajesh Butalia
- Screenplay by: Rajesh Butalia
- Story by: Rajesh Butalia
- Produced by: Manish Kalaria
- Starring: Prashant Narayanan; Tulna; Avinash Dhyani
- Cinematography: Anubhav Bansal; Devendra Golatakar; Harish Negi; Anna Ador
- Edited by: Sandeep Singh Bajeli
- Music by: Sunjoy Bose
- Production company: Evana Entertainment
- Release date: 27 May 2016 (India)
- Running time: 129 minutes
- Country: India
- Language: Hindi

Fredrick is a 2016 psychological action thriller written by Rajesh Butalia, directed by Rajesh Butalia and produced by Manish Kalaria. The film stars Prashant Narayanan, Tulna and Avinash Dhyani in the lead roles. The film was released worldwide on 27 May 2016.

== Plot ==
A 16-year-old boy has a strong bond with another boy. His father not only opposes this, he has attacked the other boy. The story takes a surprising and unimaginable turn when Vikram realizes that whatever clues they find during their search are all linked with Fredrick; every second they find something shocking. They wonder who Fredrick is and where he is. If Fredrick wanted to have him killed, he could have done so easily. They wonder why he hasn't.

All the puzzles and mysteries are running parallel and when Vikram learns that Fredrick is not trying to kill him, he becomes even more confused. One day he finally comes face to face with Fredrick, who himself has come forth as a larger unimaginable riddle. Amidst all these mysteries and revelations this interesting tale finally reaches a painful end.

== Reception ==
Fredrick has received mixed responses from various film critics. HindustaNews rated the film 4/5 and wrote "Fredrick is a good film and the direction of the film is also excellent. Shootings of this film have been done in beautiful places. But film shooting techniques can be little bit improvised." FilmyTown rated the film 3/5, and wrote "To a certain extent, this story keeps one on the edge and intrigued right from the first frame. It has a decent pace except towards the climax where it could have been crisper." The Times of India rated the film 1.5/5. NowRunning rated the film 1/5. But Avinash Dhyani received a very positive response for his acting. Soon he is coming in Rifleman Jaswant Singh Rawat.

== Cast ==
- Prashant Narayanan
- Tulna
- Avinash Dhyani

== Production ==
This film was produced by Evana Entertainment, who holds exclusive rights for the music distribution.

== Music ==
The music for Fredrick was composed by Sunjoy Bose, with lyrics written by Rajesh Butalia.

Fredrick

Soundtrack album by KK, Shaan, Sunidhi Chauhan
- Released: 2016
- Recorded: 2015
- Genre: Feature film soundtrack
- Length: 28:50
- Language: Hindi, Urdu
