= Luv Ki Arrange Marriage =

2024 Hindi film directed by Ishrat R. Khan

- Official release poster
- Directed by: Ishrat R. Khan
- Written by: Raaj Shaandilyaa
- Produced by: Vinod Bhanushali; Kamlesh Bhanushali; Raaj Shaandilyaa; Vimal Lahoti
- Starring: Sunny Singh; Avneet Kaur; Annu Kapoor; Supriya Pathak
- Cinematography: Arun Prasad
- Music by: Prini Siddhant Madhav; Amol-Abhishek; Jaidev Kumar; Sadhu S. Tiwari; Meet Bros; Sandesh Shandilya
- Production companies: Bhanushali Studios; Thinkink Picturez
- Distributed by: ZEE5
- Release date: 14 June 2024
- Running time: 120 minutes
- Country: India
- Language: Hindi

Luv Ki Arrange Marriage (transl. Luv's Arranged Marriage) is a 2024 Indian Hindi-language romantic comedy-drama film directed by Ishrat R. Khan. The film is written by Raaj Shaandilyaa, and produced by Vinod Bhanushali, Kamlesh Bhanushali, Raaj Shaandilyaa and Vimal Lahoti, under the banner of Bhanushali Studios and Thinkink Picturez. It stars Sunny Singh and Avneet Kaur in lead roles, alongside Annu Kapoor, Supriya Pathak and Rajpal Yadav in key roles.

The film premiered on 14 June 2024, on ZEE5.

== Premise ==
Set in a small city, with its own quirks, the film highlights that love is ageless and that the boundaries between romance and family can blur in the most delightful yet chaotic ways.

== Synopsis ==
When Luv meets Ishika, he falls in love with her and decides to propose marriage. However, the situation takes an unexpected turn and things get funny when Luv's widowed father develops feelings for Ishika's mother, leading to amusing complications. As the story unfolds, the question emerges as to whether Luv will be willing to sacrifice his own love story for the sake of his father's newfound romance. The narrative progresses as it explores which couple will ultimately have a more triumphant and enduring love story.

== Cast ==
- Sunny Singh as Luv
- Avneet Kaur as Ishika
- Annu Kapoor as Prem, Luv's father
- Supriya Pathak as Supriya, Ishika's mother
- Rajpal Yadav as Pyare, Supriya's friend and secret lover
- Mushtaq Khan as Mr. Mishra, Luv's uncle
- Sudhir Pandey as Mr. Bala, Ishika's grandfather
- Paritosh Tripathi as Jugnu
- Poornima Sharma as Ishika's sister
- Geetika Mehandru as Supriya's maid

== Production ==
=== Casting ===
Sunny Singh and Avneet Kaur were cast to play the leads. Actors Annu Kapoor, Supriya Pathak, Rajpal Yadav and Sudhir Pandey were cast in supporting roles, playing pivotal characters in the film.

=== Filming ===
Principal photography took place from March 2023 to May 2023. The film was shot in different locations of Madhya Pradesh, including Orchha and Bhopal.

== Soundtrack ==
Luv Ki Arrange Marriage

Soundtrack album by Prini Siddhant Madhav Amol-Abhishek Jaidev Kumar Sadhu S. Tiwari Meet Bros Sandesh Shandilya
- Released: 13 June 2024
- Genre: Feature film soundtrack
- Length: 22:27
- Language: Hindi
- Label: Hitz Music

The film's background score is composed by Amar Mohile.

The music for the film is composed by Prini Siddhant Madhav, Amol-Abhishek, Jaidev Kumar, Sadhu S. Tiwari, Meet Bros and Sandesh Shandilya; while the lyrics are written by Arafat Mehmood, Abhishek Talented, Kumaar, Rohit Sharma, Shabbir Ahmed and Anil Pandey. The songs are sung by Salman Ali, Nakash Aziz, Sukhwinder Singh, Amit Gupta, Meet Bros, Piyush Mehroliyaa, Chaitalee Chaaya and Dev Negi.

Track list
| No. | Title | Lyrics | Music | Singer(s) | Length |
|---|---|---|---|---|---|
| 1. | "Ishq Ki Chhav Tale" | Arafat Mehmood | Prini Siddhant Madhav | Salman Ali | 5:11 |
| 2. | "Jab Bhi Naachey" | Abhishek Talented | Amol-Abhishek | Nakash Aziz | 3:17 |
| 3. | "Dil Samajhdaar" | Kumaar | Jaidev Kumar | Sukhwinder Singh | 4:08 |
| 4. | "Bairagi" | Rohit Sharma | Sadhu S. Tiwari | Amit Gupta | 3:08 |
| 5. | "Ghodi" | Shabbir Ahmed | Meet Bros | Meet Bros, Piyush Mehroliyaa, Chaitalee Chaaya | 3:00 |
| 6. | "Dahiya" | Anil Pandey | Sandesh Shandilya | Dev Negi | 3:11 |

== Release ==
The poster was released on 30 May 2024, followed by the official trailer on 31 May 2024. The film premiered on 14 June 2024, on ZEE5.

== Reception ==
=== Critical response ===
Simran Khan of Times Now gave the film 3 stars (out of 5) and wrote, "While setting up comedy and romance well, the film sometimes stretches thin, however, it offers a light-hearted take on love and delivers laughs and heartwarming scenes despite its flaws". Archika Khurana of The Times of India gave the film 2 stars (out of 5) and wrote, "Beyond the scenic backdrop and decent acting, the story lacks substance, making it a bland tale of love, destiny, and a twist of fate". Deepa Gahlot of Rediff.com rated the film 1 star (out of 5) and commented, "If this were a French farce, nobody would have batted an eyelid if the father of the groom and the mother of the bride fell in love and wanted to marry, but here, some crude comedy is generated with a dash of melodrama". Pratidin Time wrote, "The film embraces small-town charm and a touch of boldness, yet stays within cultural boundaries, navigating with restraint and modesty, while avoiding explicit content; it leaves a lasting impression despite its imperfections, showcasing that love transcends boundaries, even in unexpected settings".
