= Sumeru (film) =

2021 Indian romantic film

- Directed by: Avinash Dhyani
- Produced by: Avinash Dhyani; Ravinder Bhatt
- Starring: Avinash Dhyani; Sanskriti Bhatt; Shagufta Ali
- Cinematography: Harish Negi
- Edited by: Mohit Kumar
- Music by: Sunjoy Bose
- Production company: Padmasiddhi Films
- Release date: 1 October 2021
- Country: India
- Language: Hindi

Sumeru is a 2021 Indian Hindi-language film directed by Avinash Dhyani and starring Avinash Dhyani and Sanskriti Bhatt. The film was shot at various locations in Uttarakhand. The film was scheduled to be released on 1 October 2021.

The film is an innocent love story between Bhavar Pratap Singh (Dhyani) and Savi Malhotra (Bhatt). Ali is seen in a "small but important role" in the film.

== Cast ==
- Avinash Dhyani as Bhavar Pratap Singh
- Sanskriti Bhatt as Savi Malhotra
- Shagufta Ali as Shamaira
