= Phooli (film) =

2024 Hindi film

- Theatrical release poster
- Directed by: Avinash Dhyani
- Written by: Avinash Dhyani
- Produced by: Manish Kumar; Avinash Dhyani; Lalit Jindal; Rajeev Sharma; Capt. Manoj Kumar Singh
- Starring: Riya Baluni; Avinash Dhyani; Suruchi Saklani; Prince Juyal
- Cinematography: Ramesh Samant
- Edited by: Dhananjay Dhyani
- Music by: Avinash Dhyani
- Production companies: Padma Siddhi Films; Dream Sky Creations
- Release date: 7 June 2024
- Country: India
- Language: Hindi

Phooli is an Indian Hindi-language drama film, written and directed by Avinash Dhyani. The film was released in cinemas on June 7, 2024.

== Plot ==
The film is about a young girl Phooli, who aspires to study and follow her dreams. It shows her hardships and her desire to learn, but her situation prevents her from pursuing her education. Afterwards, a Jaadugar (magician) enters her life, encouraging her to do well in her studies and helping her get through difficult circumstances.

== Cast ==
- Riya Baluni as Phooli
- Avinash Dhyani as Mahendra Sarkar (Jaadugar)
- Suruchi Saklani as elder Phooli
- Prince Juyal as Parveen
- Rishi Raj Bhatt as Phooli’S Father Dillu
- Sanjay Agarwal as Robin
- Vijay Bhatt as Teacher
- Bhagat Singh Ghusain as Kaka

== Production ==
This is directed by Avinash Dhyani and produced by Manish Kumar, Avinash Dhyani, Lalit Jindal, Rajeev Sharma, and Capt. Manoj Kumar Singh. co-produced by Sanjay Agrawal, Mohit Tyagi, Smriti Hari and Ravinder Bhat. The film was entirely shot in Uttrakhand.

== Reception ==
The film received rather positive reviews. Film Information, however, was more mixed about the production.

The film has been screened in numerous schools, where it has received widespread appreciation from teachers. They have encouraged students and their parents to watch it and draw inspiration from its message. The Uttarakhand Government also greatly appreciated the film, providing a subsidy to its makers in recognition of its impact.
