= Raaj Shaandilyaa =

Indian television and Bollywood writer (born 1985)

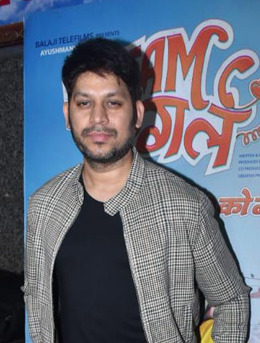
- Shaandilyaa in 2019
- Born: 16 September 1985 (age 41); Jhansi, Uttar Pradesh, India
- Occupations: Screenwriter; dialogue writer; director; managing director
- Years active: 2007 – present
- Known for: Comedy Circus (television series); Dream Girl (film)
- Title: Managing director and chairman,ThinkInk Picturez Ltd.
- Spouse: Vershaa Kashyap
- Website: thinkinkpicturez.com (company website)

Raaj Shaandilyaa (born 1985) is an Indian television and Bollywood writer from Jhansi, Uttar Pradesh. He then grew up in Faridabad, Haryana.

From 2007 to 2014, Shaandilyaa was a lead writer and content director for the Sony Entertainment Television series Comedy Circus.

== Career ==
Shaandilyaa began his career in 2006 and has written approximately 350 scripts for comedians Krishna Abhishek and Sudesh Lehri and approximately 200 scripts for comedian Kapil Sharma.

Shaandilyaa holds a 2013 record in the Limca Book of Records for having written 625 scripts.

In 2019, he made his directorial debut with the comedy film Dream Girl, which was a commercial success.

== Filmography ==
†	Denotes films that have not yet been released

Year	Title	Director	Writer	Dialogue writer	Screenplay	Producer	Lyrics	Notes
2007	Comedy Circus		Yes					
2015	Welcome Back			Yes				
2016	Freaky Ali			Yes				
2017	Bhoomi			Yes	Yes			
2018	Bhaiaji Superhit			Yes				
2019	Jabariya Jodi			Yes				
2019	Dream Girl	Yes	Yes	Yes	Yes			Directorial debut
2022	Janhit Mein Jaari		Yes			Yes	Yes	Debuting as a producer
2022	The Great Weddings of Munnes	Yes	Yes	Yes	Yes	Yes		web series on Voot
2023	Dream Girl 2	Yes	Yes	Yes	Yes			
2024	Luv Ki Arrange Marriage		Yes	Yes	Yes	Yes		
2024	Vicky Vidya Ka Woh Wala Video	Yes	Yes	Yes	Yes	Yes		
