= Avinash Dhyani =

Indian actor and film director

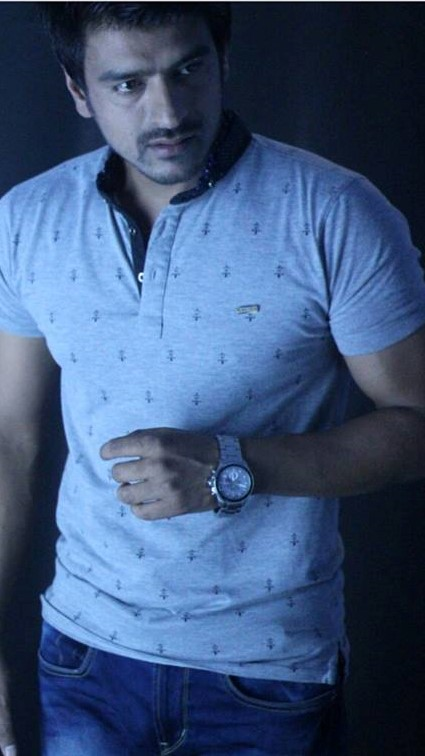
- Born: Avinash Dhyani; 22 May 1987 (age 39); Sulmori, Pauri Garhwal, Uttrakhand, India
- Occupation: Film actor
- Years active: 2016–present
- Parent: Late shri Diwaker Dhyani

Avinash Dhyani (born 22 May 1987) is an Indian actor, film director, and writer, working in the Hindi film industry.

== Early life and education ==
Avinash Dhyani is a television actor, Director and a writer who appears in modeling shows, Television and a few movies. Avinash Dhyani was born on 22 May 1987 in Sulmori, Pauri Garhwal Uttarakhand. Avinash has described himself as a "regular kid who has the passion of acting and wanted to become a Bollywood Hero since his childhood ". He had his schooling from Dehradun, Uttarakhand and completed his graduation from DAV College Dehradun. His father Late shri Diwaker Dhyani was an Army Man.

== Career ==
Avinash Dhyani's debut film, Fredrick, directed by Rajesh Butalia, was released in April 2016.

After Fredrick Avinash Dhyani worked in another bollywood movie 72 Hours: Martyr Who Never Died as an actor, director and writer.

72 Hours: Martyr Who Never Died was his first film as a director. This movie was a biopic of an indian soldier Rifleman Jaswant Singh Rawat who fights against the Chinese army alone for 72 hours in 1962 Sino-Indian War. 72 Hours was released on 18 January 2019. After the Success of 72 Hours: Martyr Who Never Died Avinash Dhyani Establish his Own production House Padmasiddhi Films. in 2019.

Mr. Avinash Dhyani is all set for the release of Kholi Ka Ganesh, his first Garhwali film as a director.

Avinash Dhyani's upcoming movie is Saumya Ganesh, which is going to be released on summer 2020.

== Filmography ==
Year	Film	Director	Actor	Producer	Ref.
2016	Fredrick		Yes		
2019	72 Hours: Martyr Who Never Died	Yes	Yes		
2022	Saumya Ganesh	Yes	Yes		
2022	Sumeru	Yes	Yes		
2024	Phooli	Yes	Yes		
2025	Kholi Ka Ganesh	Yes	Yes	Yes	
