= 71st National Film Awards =

Award ceremony for Indian films of 2023

- Awarded for: Best of Indian cinema in 2023
- Awarded by: National Film Development Corporation of India
- Presented by: President of India
- Announced on: 1 August 2025
- Presented on: 23 September 2025
- Site: New Delhi
- Official website: nfaindia.org/en

Highlights
- Best Feature Film: 12th Fail
- Best Non-Feature Film: Flowering Man
- Best Film Critic: Utpal Datta
- Dadasaheb Phalke Award: Mohanlal
- Most awards: Animal, Parking and Sam Bahadur (3)

The 71st National Film Awards, presented by the National Film Development Corporation of India, were announced on 1 August 2025 by the Ministry of Information and Broadcasting in a press conference to honour the best of Indian cinema in 2023. There were 332 entries in the feature film category, 115 in non-feature films, 27 books, and 16 critics’ submissions. The winners along with the Dadasaheb Phalke Award recipient were felicitated by the President, Droupadi Murmu on 23 September 2025 at the Vigyan Bhawan, New Delhi.

== Selection process ==
The National Film Development Corporation of India invited online entries with the acceptable last date for entries until 18 September 2024. Feature and Non-Feature Films certified by Central Board of Film Certification between 1 January 2023, and 31 December 2023, were eligible for the film award categories. Books, critical studies, reviews or articles on cinema published in Indian newspapers, magazines, and journals between 1 January 2023, and 31 December 2023, were eligible for the best writing on cinema section. Entries of dubbed, revised or copied versions of a film or translation, abridgements, edited or annotated works and reprints were ineligible for the awards.

For the feature and non-feature Films sections, films in any Indian language, shot on 16 mm, 35 mm, a wider film gauge or a digital format, and released in cinemas, on video or digital formats for home viewing were eligible. Films were required to be certified as a feature film, documentary, short film, or animation film, by the Central Board of Film Certification.

== Dadasaheb Phalke Award ==
Introduced in 1969, the Dadasaheb Phalke Award is India's highest award in the field of cinema given to recognise the contributions of film personalities towards the development of Indian cinema and for distinguished contributions to the medium, its growth and promotion. The recipient is awarded with 'Golden Lotus Award' (Swarna Kamal), cash prize of ₹10 lakh (US$11,000), medallion and a shawl. The 2023 recipient is Mohanlal.

A committee consisting three personalities from the Indian film industry was appointed to evaluate the award. Following were the jury members:

- Jury Members

• Mithun Chakraborty
• Shankar Mahadevan
• Ashutosh Gowariker

Award	Image	Awardee(s)	Awarded As	Cash prize
Dadasaheb Phalke Award		Mohanlal	Actor	Swarna Kamal, ₹10 lakh (US$11,000), medallion and a shawl

== Feature Film ==
=== Jury ===
For the Feature Film section, six committees were formed based on the different geographic regions in India. The two-tier evaluation process included a central committee and five regional committees. The central committee, headed by the director Ashutosh Gowariker, included the heads of each regional committee and five other jury members. At regional level, each committee consisted of one chief and four members. The chief and one non-chief member of each regional committee were selected from outside that geographic region. The table below names the jury members for the central and regional committees:

Central Jury

• Ashutosh Gowariker (Chairperson)
• M. N. Swamy	• Geeta M. Gurappa
• Dr. V. N. Aditya	• Aneesh Basu
• Paresh Vora	• Sushil Rajpal
• Vivek Pratap	• Pradeep Nair
• Maniram Singh	• Prakruti Mishra

Northern Region: (Bhojpuri, Dogri, English, Hindi, Punjabi, Rajasthani, Urdu)

• Jose Antony Palackapillil (Head)
• Chethan Mundadi	• Kamlesh Kumar Mishra
• Niraj Kumar Mishra	• Pramod Kumar

Eastern Region: (Assamese, Bengali, Odia and North-Eastern languages)

• Shivadhwaj Shetty (Head)
• Bobby Sarma Baruah	• Oinam Doren
• Sukumar Nandlal Jatani	• Tushar Kanti Bandyopadhyay

Western Region: (Gujarati, Konkani, Marathi)

• Tushar Hiranandani (Head)
• Chirantana Bhatt	• Mandar Talauliker
• Praveen Morchhale	• Shivaji Lotan Patil

Southern Region I: (Malayalam, Tamil)

• Abhijeet Shirish Deshpande (Head)
• Manoj C. D.	• Aparnaa Singh
• Selvanarayanan I	• S Rajasekharan

Southern Region II: (Kannada, Telugu)

• Malay Ray (Head)
• Raghunandan B R	• Runa Bhutda
• Yakub Khader Gulvady	• Satish Varma Mandapati

=== Golden Lotus Award ===
All the awardees are awarded with 'Golden Lotus Award (Swarna Kamal)', a certificate and cash prize.

Award	Film	Language	Awardee(s)	Cash prize
Best Feature Film	12th Fail	Hindi	Producer: Vinod Chopra Films; Director: Vidhu Vinod Chopra	₹3,00,000 each
Best Debut Film of a Director	Aatmapamphlet	Marathi	Ashish Avinash Bende	₹3,00,000
Best Popular Film Providing Wholesome Entertainment	Rocky Aur Rani Kii Prem Kahaani	Hindi	Producer: Dharma Productions; Director: Karan Johar	₹3,00,000 each
Best Children's Film	Naal 2	Marathi	Producer: Aatpat Production and Zee Studios; Director: Sudhakar Reddy Yakkanti	₹3,00,000 each
Best Film in AVGC	Hanu-Man	Telugu	Producer: Mythri Movie Makers; Director: Prasanth Varma; Animator: Jetty Venkat Kumar	₹3,00,000 each
Best Direction	The Kerala Story	Hindi	Sudipto Sen	₹3,00,000

=== Silver Lotus Award ===
Official Name: Rajat Kamal

All the awardees are awarded with 'Silver Lotus Award (Rajat Kamal)', a certificate and cash prize.

Award	Film	Language	Awardee(s)	Cash prize
Best Feature Film Promoting National, Social and Environmental Values	Sam Bahadur	Hindi	Producer: Unilazer Ventures Private Limited; Director: Meghna Gulzar	₹2,00,000 each
Best Actor in a Leading Role	Jawan	Hindi	Shah Rukh Khan	₹2,00,000 shared
Best Actor in a Leading Role	12th Fail	Hindi	Vikrant Massey	₹2,00,000 shared
Best Actress in a Leading Role	Mrs. Chatterjee vs Norway	Hindi	Rani Mukerji	₹2,00,000
Best Actor in a Supporting Role	Pookkaalam	Malayalam	Vijayaraghavan	₹2,00,000 shared
Best Actor in a Supporting Role	Parking	Tamil	M. S. Bhaskar	₹2,00,000 shared
Best Actress in a Supporting Role	Ullozhukku	Malayalam	Urvashi	₹2,00,000 shared
Best Actress in a Supporting Role	Vash	Gujarati	Janki Bodiwala	₹2,00,000 shared
Best Child Artist	Gandhi Tatha Chettu	Telugu	Sukriti Veni Bandreddi	₹2,00,000 shared
Best Child Artist	Gypsy	Marathi	Kabir Khandare	₹2,00,000 shared
Best Child Artist	Naal 2	Marathi	Treesha Thosar	₹2,00,000 shared
Best Child Artist	Naal 2	Marathi	Shrinivas Pokale	₹2,00,000 shared
Best Child Artist	Naal 2	Marathi	Bhargav Jagtap	₹2,00,000 shared
Best Male Playback Singer	Baby (Song: "Premistunna")	Telugu	P V N S Rohit	₹2,00,000
Best Female Playback Singer	Jawan (Song: "Chaleya")	Hindi	Shilpa Rao	₹2,00,000
Best Cinematography	The Kerala Story	Hindi	Prasantanu Mohapatra	₹2,00,000
Best Screenplay • Screenplay Writer (Original)	Baby	Telugu	Sai Rajesh	₹2,00,000 shared
Best Screenplay • Screenplay Writer (Original)	Parking	Tamil	Ramkumar Balakrishnan	₹2,00,000 shared
Best Screenplay • Dialogues	Sirf Ek Bandaa Kaafi Hai	Hindi	Deepak Kingrani	₹2,00,000
Best Sound Design	Animal	Hindi	Sachin Sudhakaran	₹2,00,000 shared
Best Sound Design	Animal	Hindi	Hariharan Muralidharan	₹2,00,000 shared
Best Editing	Pookkaalam	Malayalam	Midhun Murali	₹2,00,000
Best Production Design	2018	Malayalam	Mohandas	₹2,00,000
Best Costume Design	Sam Bahadur	Hindi	Sachin Lovalekar	₹2,00,000 shared
Best Costume Design	Sam Bahadur	Hindi	Divvya Gambhir	₹2,00,000 shared
Best Costume Design	Sam Bahadur	Hindi	Nidhhi Gambhir	₹2,00,000 shared
Best Make-up	Sam Bahadur	Hindi	Shrikant Desai	₹2,00,000
Best Music Direction • Songs	Vaathi	Tamil	G. V. Prakash Kumar	₹2,00,000
Best Music Direction • Background Music	Animal	Hindi	Harshavardhan Rameshwar	₹2,00,000
Best Lyrics	Balagam (Song: "Ooru Palletooru")	Telugu	Kasarla Shyam	₹2,00,000
Best Choreography	Rocky Aur Rani Kii Prem Kahaani (Song: "Dhindhora Baje Re")	Hindi	Vaibhavi Merchant	₹2,00,000
Best VFX Supervisor	Hanu-Man	Telugu	Jetty Venkat Kumar	₹2,00,000
Best Stunt Choreography	Hanu-Man	Telugu	Nandu	₹2,00,000 shared
Best Stunt Choreography	Hanu-Man	Telugu	Pruthvi Uppari	₹2,00,000 shared

=== Regional awards ===
All the awardees are awarded with Silver Lotus Award (Rajat Kamal), a certificate and cash prize.

Best Feature Film in Each of the Language Specified in the Schedule VIII of the Constitution
Award	Film	Awardee(s)		Cash prize
Award	Film	Producer	Director	Cash prize
Best Assamese Feature Film	Rongatapu 1982	BRC Cine Production	Adityam Saikia	₹2,00,000 each
Best Bengali Feature Film	Deep Fridge	Colors of Dream Entertainment	Arjunn Dutta	₹2,00,000 each
Best Gujarati Feature Film	Vash	Big Box Series Production and KS Entertainment	Krishnadev Yagnik	₹2,00,000 each
Best Hindi Feature Film	Kathal	Netflix, Balaji Motion Pictures and Sikhya Entertainment	Yashowardhan Mishra	₹2,00,000 each
Best Kannada Feature Film	Kandeelu – The Ray of Hope	Swastik Entertainment	Yeshoda Prakash Kottukathira	₹2,00,000 each
Best Malayalam Feature Film	Ullozhukku	Unnilazer Ventures Pvt Ltd and MacGuffin Pictures	Christo Tomy	₹2,00,000 each
Best Marathi Feature Film	Shyamchi Aai	Amruta Films	Sujay Dahake	₹2,00,000 each
Best Odia Feature Film	Pushkara	Tarang Cine Productions	Subhransu Das	₹2,00,000 each
Best Punjabi Feature Film	Godday Godday Chaa	VH Entertainment and Zee Studios	Vijay Kumar Arora	₹2,00,000 each
Best Tamil Feature Film	Parking	Passion Studios and Soldiers Factory	Ramkumar Balakrishnan	₹2,00,000 each
Best Telugu Feature Film	Bhagavanth Kesari	Shine Screens	Anil Ravipudi	₹2,00,000 each

Best Feature Film in Each of the Language Other Than Those Specified In the Schedule VIII of the Constitution
Award	Film	Awardee(s)		Cash prize
Award	Film	Producer	Director	Cash prize
Best Garo Feature Film	Rimdogittanga	Anna Films, Uncombed Buddha and Joicy Studio	Dominic Sangma	₹2,00,000 each
Best Tai Phake Feature Film	Pai Tang	Naba Kumar Bhuyan	Prabal Khaund	₹2,00,000 each

=== Special Mention ===
All the awardees are awarded with a certificate.

Award	Film	Language	Awardee(s)	Cash prize
Special Mention	Animal	Hindi	M. R. Rajakrishnan (Sound Designer)	Certificate only

== Non-Feature Film ==
Non-feature length films made in any Indian language and certified by the Central Board of Film Certification as a documentary, short film, animation film etc are eligible for non-feature film section.

=== Jury ===
• P. Sheshadri (Chairperson)
• Pankaja Thakur	• K. S. Selvaraj
• Srishti Lakhera	• Jaicheng Jai Dohutia
• Atul Gangwar	• Olivia Das

=== Golden Lotus Award ===
Official Name: Swarna Kamal

All the awardees are awarded with 'Golden Lotus Award (Swarna Kamal)', a certificate and cash prize.

Award	Film	Language	Awardee(s)	Cash prize
Best Non-Feature Film	Flowering Man	Hindi	Producer: Film and Television Institute of India; Director: Soumyajit Ghosh Dastidar	₹3,00,000 each
Best Direction	The First Film	Hindi	Piyush Thakur	₹3,00,000
Best Debut Film of a Director	Mau: The Spirit Dreams of Cheraw	Mizo	Shilpika Bordoloi	₹3,00,000

=== Silver Lotus Award ===
Official Name: Rajat Kamal

All the awardees are awarded with Silver Lotus Award (Rajat Kamal) and cash prize.

Award	Film	Language	Awardee(s)	Cash prize
Best Biographical / Historical Reconstruction / Compilation Film	Mo Bou, Mo Gaan	Odia	Producer: Kicksy Wicksy Films and RNV 1820 Films; Director: Subash Sahoo	₹2,00,000 shared
Best Biographical / Historical Reconstruction / Compilation Film	Lentina Ao – A Light on the Eastern Horizon	English	Producer: NFDC; Director: Sanjib Parasar and Nilakshi Medhi	₹2,00,000 shared
Best Arts / Cultural Film	Timeless Tamil Nadu	English	Producer: Celebrities Management Private Limited; Director: Kamakhya Narayan Singh	₹2,00,000 shared
Best Documentary	God Vulture and Human	English, Hindi and Telugu	Producer: Studio Lichi and Dr. Rajesh Chandwani; Director: Rishiraj Agarwal	₹2,00,000 each
Best Non Feature Film Promoting Social And Environmental Values	The Silent Epidemic	English	Producer: Cinema4good Pvt Ltd and Raahgiri Foundation; Director: Akshat Gupta	₹2,00,000 each
Best Short Film	Giddh (The Scavenger)	Hindi	Producer: Ellanar Films; Director: Manish Saini	₹2,00,000 each
Best Cinematography	Little Wings	Tamil	Saravanamaruthu Soundarapandi and Meenakshi Soman	₹2,00,000 shared
Best Sound Design	Dhundhgiri Ke Phool	Hindi	Shubharun Sengupta	₹2,00,000
Best Editing	Moving Focus	English	Niladri Roy	₹2,00,000
Best Music Direction	The First Film	Hindi	Pranil Desai	₹2,00,000
Best Narration / Voice Over	The Sacred – Jack Exploring the Tree of Wishes	English	Harikrishnan S	₹2,00,000
Best Script	Sunflowers Were the First Ones to Know...	Kannada	Chidananda S Naik	₹2,00,000

=== Special Mention ===
All the awardees are awarded with a certificate.

Award	Film	Language	Awardee(s)	Cash prize
Special Mention	Nekal – Chronicle of The Paddy Man	Malayalam	Producer and director: M K Ramdas	Certificate only
Special Mention	The Sea & Seven Villages	Odia	Producer: Kadambini Media Pvt. Ltd.; Director: Himansu Sekhar Khatua	Certificate only

== Best Writing on Cinema ==
The awards aim at encouraging study and appreciation of cinema as an art form and dissemination of information and critical appreciation of this art-form through publication of books, articles, reviews etc.

=== Jury ===
• Gopalakrishna Pai (Chairperson)
• Ashok Palit	• Vinod Anupam

=== Golden Lotus Award ===
Official Name: Swarna Kamal

All the awardees are awarded with the Golden Lotus Award (Swarna Kamal) accompanied with a cash prize.

Award	Awardee(s)	Language	Cash prize
Best Film Critic	Utpal Datta	Assamese	₹1,00,000

== Controversies ==
=== Backlash over The Kerala Story awards ===
Shortly after The Kerala Story received the Best Director and Best Cinematography awards, the decision drew significant criticism. Kerala's Chief Minister Pinarayi Vijayan condemned the decision as a "grave insult" to the state, accusing the film of spreading "misinformation" and legitimizing a "divisive ideology," while Opposition Leader V. D. Satheesan alleged that the awards were being used to further a political "hate campaign". State ministers Saji Cherian, K. N. Balagopal, V. Sivankutty, and P. A. Mohammed Riyas similarly described the decision as an attempt to malign Kerala. Congress MP K. C. Venugopal criticised the decision, calling the film undeserving and accusing it of promoting a "rotten agenda". Jury member Pradeep Nair also dissented, calling the film "propaganda," and several media outlets noted that the awards were conferred despite longstanding allegations of exaggerated and fictionalized depictions of conversions and ISIS recruitment in Kerala. The Film and Television Institute of India (FTII) Student’s Association condemned the decision, denouncing the film as "majoritarian propaganda with a hate‑filled agenda disguised as cinema". Veteran actress Ranjini criticised the decision, calling it a "fabricated story" and remarked that honouring it "tarnishes" the sanctity of the awards. Similarly, actress Fara Shibla also criticised the decision, accusing the film of "misrepresenting" Kerala’s culture. In response, jury chairperson and filmmaker Ashutosh Gowariker defended the decision, stating the film addressed a "difficult topic" with "clarity" and demonstrated strong visual execution.

=== Urvashi Press Release ===
Actress Urvashi, who received the Best Supporting Actress award for her performance in Malayalam film Ullozhukku, expressed dissatisfaction, stating she believed her role qualified for the Best Actress category and called for greater transparency in the jury’s selection process. She also condemned the jury's rejection towards the cast and crew of Aadujeevitham, especially Prithviraj Sukumaran's performance who was the front-runner for the Year's Best Actor award.
