= National Film Award for Best Child Artist =

Indian film award

- National award for contributions to Indian Cinema; Instituted in 1968
- Awarded for: Best performance by a child artist in a year
- Sponsored by: National Film Development Corporation of India
- Rewards: Rajat Kamal (Silver Lotus); ₹2,00,000
- First award: 1968

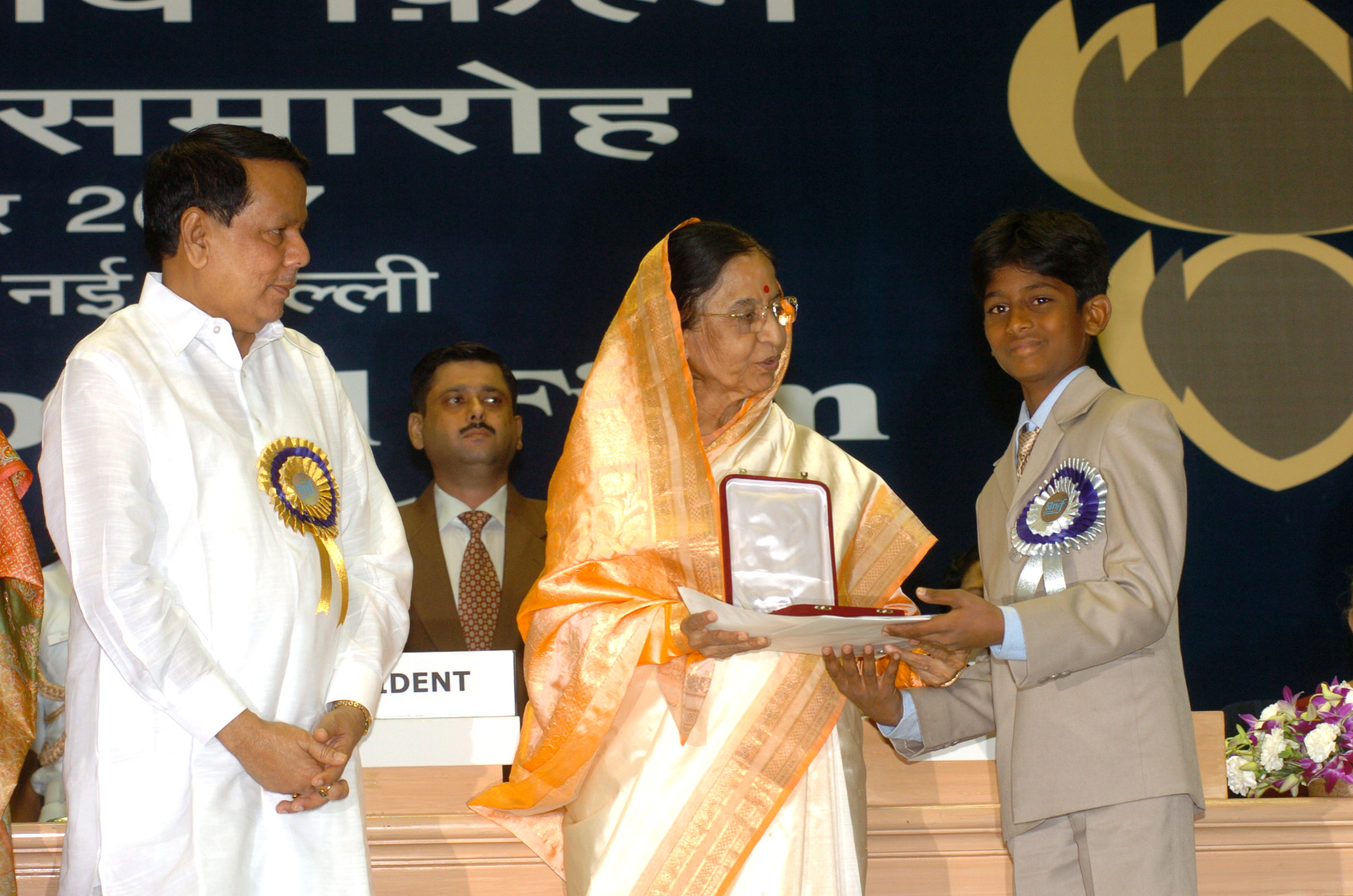
The President, Smt. Pratibha Devisingh Patil presenting the Best Child Artist Award for the year 2005 to Master Sai Kumar for his role in Telugu film “Bommalata – A Bellyful Of Dreams”, at the 53rd National Film Awards function, in New Delhi on September 14, 2007.

The National Film Award for Best Child Artist is one of the National Film Awards presented annually by the National Film Development Corporation of India. It is one of several awards presented for feature films and awarded with Silver Lotus (Rajat Kamal).

The award was instituted in 1968, at 16th National Film Awards and awarded annually for films produced in the year across the country, in all Indian languages. The actors whose performances have won awards have worked in eleven major languages. Hindi (24 awards), Marathi (16 awards), Tamil (14 awards), Malayalam (14 awards), Kannada (7 awards), Bengali (6 awards), Telugu (5 awards), Meitei (1 award), Konkani (1 award), Assamese (1 award), Odia (1 award).

== Winners ==
Award includes 'Silver Lotus' (Rajat Kamal) and cash prize. Following are the award winners over the years:

List of award recipients, showing the year (award ceremony), film(s) and language(s)
Year	Recipient(s)	Role(s)	Film(s)	Language	Refs.
1968 (16th)	Baby Rani	Geetha	Kuzhanthaikkaga	Tamil	
1969 (17th)	No Award				
1970 (18th)	Rishi Kapoor	Young Raju	Mera Naam Joker	Hindi	
1971 (19th)	Sachin Pilgaonkar		Ajab Tujhe Sarkar	Marathi	
1972 (20th)	Neera Malia		Ranur Pratham Bhag	Bengali	
1973 (21st)	G. S. Nataraj	Kitty	Kaadu	Kannada	
1974 (22nd)	Kushal Chakraborty	Mukul Dhar	Sonar Kella	Bengali	
1975 (23rd)	No Award				
1976 (24th)	Raju Shrestha	Deepak Kumar Agnihotri (Deepu)	Chitchor	Hindi	
1977 (25th)	Ajith Kumar	Naani	Ghatashraddha	Kannada	
1978 (26th)	Kanchan De Biswas		Ganadevata	Bengali	
1979 (27th)	Geeta Khanna	Bhavana	Aangan Ki Kali	Hindi	
1980 (28th)	Aravind	Appu	Oppol	Malayalam	
1981 (29th)	Leikhendra Singh	Thoithoi	Imagi Ningthem	Meitei	
1982 (30th)	Vimal	Rajesh (Unni)	Aaroodam	Malayalam	
1983 (31st)	Suresh	Kayama (Younger Ramachandran)	Malamukalile Daivam	Malayalam	
1984 (32nd)	Aravind	Vinod	My Dear Kuttichathan	Malayalam	
1984 (32nd)	Suresh	Vijay	My Dear Kuttichathan	Malayalam	
1984 (32nd)	Mukesh		My Dear Kuttichathan	Malayalam	
1984 (32nd)	Sonia	Lakshmi	My Dear Kuttichathan	Malayalam	
1985 (33rd)	Puneeth Rajkumar	Ramu	Bettada Hoovu	Kannada	
1986 (34th)	Aniket Sengupta	Kanu	Phera	Bengali	
1987 (35th)	Manjunath	Swamy	Swamy	Hindi	
1988 (36th)	Shafiq Syed	Krishna (Chipau)	Salaam Bombay!	Hindi	
1989 (37th)	Mrinmayee Chandorkar	Chhakuli	Kalat Nakalat	Marathi	
1990 (38th)	Shamili	Anjali	Anjali	Tamil	
1990 (38th)	Tarun	Arjun	Anjali	Tamil	
1990 (38th)	Shruthi	Anu	Anjali	Tamil	
1991 (39th)	Santhosh Reddy		Bhadram Koduko	Telugu	
1992 (40th)	Amit Phalke		Mujhse Dosti Karoge	Hindi	
1993 (41st)	Tarasankar Misra		Lavanya Preethi	Odia	
1994 (42nd)	Vijay Raghavendra	Kotresha	Kotreshi Kanasu	Kannada	
1995 (43rd)	Vishwas	Murthy	Kraurya	Kannada	
1996 (44th)	Annapareddy Kavya	Bunny	Little Soldiers	Telugu	
1996 (44th)	Kumar	Parameswaran (Pachu)	Desadanam	Malayalam	
1997 (45th)	Dhanraj		Dhanna	Hindi	
1998 (46th)	P. Shwetha	Malli	Malli	Tamil	
1999 (47th)	Aswin Thampy		Jalamarmaram	Malayalam	
2000 (48th)	Udayaraj	Balasubramaniam (Pulli)	Nila Kaalam	Tamil	
2001 (49th)	P. Shwetha	Kannamma (Kutty)	Kutty	Tamil	
2002 (50th)	Shweta Prasad	Chunni / Munni	Makdee	Hindi	
2002 (50th)	P. S. Keerthana	Amudha	Kannathil Muthamittal	Tamil	
2003 (51st)	Ashwin Chitale	Parashuram Vichare	Shwaas	Marathi	
2003 (51st)	Kalidas Jayaram	Vasudev	Ente Veedu Appoontem	Malayalam	
2004 (52nd)	Om Bhutkar	Joze	Chhota Sipahi	Hindi	
2005 (53rd)	Sai Kumar		Bommalata	Telugu	
2006 (54th)	Divya Chaphadkar		Antarnad	Konkani	
2007 (55th)	Sharad Goekar	Tingya	Tingya	Marathi	
2008 (56th)	Shams Patel	Municipality	Thanks Maa	Hindi	
2009 (57th)	Kishore	Anbukkarasu	Pasanga	Tamil	
2009 (57th)	Sree Raam	Jeeva Nithyanandham	Pasanga	Tamil	
2010 (58th)	Harsh Mayar	Chotu (Kalam)	I Am Kalam	Hindi	
2010 (58th)	Shantanu Ranganekar	Sanjya	Champions	Marathi	
2010 (58th)	Machindra Gadkar	Raju	Champions	Marathi	
2010 (58th)	Vivek Chabukswar	Baboo	Baboo Band Baaja	Marathi	
2011 (59th)	Partho Gupte	Stanley Fernandes	Stanley Ka Dabba	Hindi	
2011 (59th)	Irrfan Khan	Fatka	Chillar Party	Hindi	
2011 (59th)	Sanath Menon	Arjun / Encyclopedia	Chillar Party	Hindi	
2011 (59th)	Rohan Grover	Rishabh / Ronny / Ramashanker Iyer / Akram	Chillar Party	Hindi	
2011 (59th)	Naman Jain	Balwan / Jhangiya	Chillar Party	Hindi	
2011 (59th)	Aarav Khanna	Aflatoon	Chillar Party	Hindi	
2011 (59th)	Vishesh Tiwari	Lakshman / Second Hand	Chillar Party	Hindi	
2011 (59th)	Chinmai Chandranshuh	Lucky / Panauti	Chillar Party	Hindi	
2011 (59th)	Vedant Desai	Silencer	Chillar Party	Hindi	
2011 (59th)	Divij Handa	Shaolin	Chillar Party	Hindi	
2011 (59th)	Shriya Sharma	Toothpaste	Chillar Party	Hindi	
2012 (60th)	Virendra Pratap	Ghumroo	Dekh Indian Circus	Hindi	
2012 (60th)	Minon	Anilkumar Bokaro	101 Chodyangal	Malayalam	
2013 (61st)	Somnath Awghade	Jambuvant Kachru Mane (Jabya)	Fandry	Marathi	
2013 (61st)	Sadhana	Chellamma	Thanga Meenkal	Tamil	
2014 (62nd)	J. Vignesh	Periya Kaaka Muttai	Kaaka Muttai	Tamil	
2014 (62nd)	Ramesh	Chinna Kaaka Muttai	Kaaka Muttai	Tamil	
2015 (63rd)	Gourav Menon	Ben	Ben	Malayalam	
2016 (64th)	Adish Praveen	Joseph / Ousepachan	Kunju Daivam	Malayalam	
2016 (64th)	Noor Islam	Chhotu	Sahaj Paather Gappo	Bengali	
2016 (64th)	Samiul Alam	Gopal	Sahaj Paather Gappo	Bengali	
2016 (64th)	Manohara K.	Jollu	Railway Children	Kannada	
2017 (65th)	Bhanita Das	Dhunu	Village Rockstars	Assamese	
2018 (66th)	P. V. Rohith	Sameera	Ondalla Eradalla	Kannada	
2018 (66th)	Sameep Singh	Young Harjeet Singh	Harjeeta	Punjabi	
2018 (66th)	Talha Ahmed Reshi	Hamid	Hamid	Urdu	
2018 (66th)	Shrinivas Pokale	Chaitanya Bhosale (Chaitya)	Naal	Marathi	
2019 (67th)	Naga Vishal	Kutty	Karuppudurai	Tamil	
2020 (68th)	Akanksha Pingle	Sumati	Sumi	Marathi	
2020 (68th)	Divyesh Indulkar	Chinmay	Sumi	Marathi	
2020 (68th)	Anish Mangesh Gosavi	Vishal	Tak-Tak	Marathi	
2021 (69th)	Bhavin Rabari	Samay	Last Film Show	Gujarati	
2022 (70th)	Sreepath Yan	Piyush Unni	Malikappuram	Malayalam	
2023 (71st)	Sukriti Veni Bandreddi	Gandhi	Gandhi Tatha Chettu	Telugu	
2023 (71st)	Kabir Khandare	Jotya	Gypsy	Marathi	
2023 (71st)	Treesha Thosar	Chimi / Revati	Naal 2	Marathi	
2023 (71st)	Shrinivas Pokale	Chaitanya "Chaitya" Bhosale	Naal 2	Marathi	
2023 (71st)	Bhargav Jagtap	Mani	Naal 2	Marathi	
2024 (72nd)	Arundev Pothula	Arun	35 Chinna Katha Kaadu	Telugu	
2024 (72nd)	Athish S. Shetty	Mithya	Mithya	Kannada	
2024 (72nd)	Riddhiman Banerjee	Babin	Onko Ki Kothin	Bengali	
2024 (72nd)	Tapomoy Deb	Tyre	Onko Ki Kothin	Bengali	
2024 (72nd)	Gitashree Chakraborty	Dolly	Onko Ki Kothin	Bengali	
