= Spirit of Chennai =

Single by C. Girinandh
- Released: 2 January 2016
- Recorded: 2016
- Length: 5:58
- Label: Sony Music India
- Songwriters: Gana Bala, Madhan Karky & Rokesh
- Producer: Vikram

"Spirit of Chennai" is a 2016 Indian Tamil-language single composed by C Girinandh and directed by Vikram. The song was made as a flood relief anthem in response to the 2015 South Indian floods which affected Chennai, and was stated by the makers to be a "tribute to all the volunteers".

== Production ==
Following the 2015 South Indian floods which affected Chennai in early December 2015, actor Vikram planned a flood relief anthem to pay homage to the volunteers during the crisis and to celebrate the spirit of the city. Titled "Spirit of Chennai", he worked on composing a song and approached C. Girinandh and his band, Oxygen, to work on a tune for the anthem. The song was composed within two hours, and Vikram called up several prominent singers to record their voices as a part of the track. The lyrics for the song were written by Madhan Karky, Gana Bala and Rokesh. Vikram subsequently began directing a video song for the anthem featuring several actors from the Indian film industry. The song was unveiled online via Sony Music India on 2 January 2016.

== Artists ==
=== Singers ===
- Akshita Vikram
- Anthony Daasan
- Aruna Sairam
- Chinmayi Sripaada
- Darshana
- Devnath Bhaskara
- Dhruv Vikram
- Haricharan
- Hariharan
- 'Kaaka Muttai' Ramesh
- Karthik
- Gana Bala
- Gopal Rao
- Manikka Vinayagam
- Marana Gana Viji
- Naresh Iyer
- Parthiban
- S. P. Balasubrahmanyam
- S. P. B. Charan
- Shakthisree Gopalan
- Shankar Mahadevan
- Shweta Mohan
- Siddharth
- Suchitra
- Sujatha
- Vijay Gopal
- Vijay Prakash
- Vikram

=== Actors and actresses ===
- Source
- Abhishek Bachchan
- Amala Paul
- Ashok Selvan
- Bharath
- Bobby Simha
- Jayam Ravi
- Jiiva
- 'Kaaka Muttai' Ramesh
- Karthi
- Khushbu
- Mumtaj
- Narain
- Nayantara
- Nithya Menen
- Nivin Pauly
- Prabhu Deva
- Prithviraj
- Siddharth
- Sivakarthikeyan
- Suriya
- Varalaxmi Sarathkumar
- Vijay Sethupathi
- Vikram
- Vikranth
- Vishnu
- Yash

=== Technicians ===
- Director: Vikram
- Producer: Vikram
- Studio: The Chiyaan Foundation
- Music composer: C. Girinandh
- Lyricists: Gana Bala, Madhan Karky and Rokesh
- Cinematographer: Om Prakash and Vijay Milton
- Editor: Anthony
- Choreographer: Sridhar

=== Musicians ===
- Piano & Programming : C. Girinandh
- Melodion: Harish
- Electric Violin : Karthick Iyer
- Flute: Vijay Gopal
- Mridangam, Kanjira & Ghatam : Ramana
- Indian Rhythms : Sharath Ravi
- Big Drums & Additional programming : Bharath
- Guitars: Bob Phukan
- Bass Guitar : Carl Fernandes
- Nadhaswaram : Balasubramani
- Violin : Balaji
- Violas : Vinaykumar & Balaji
- Cello : Srinivasan
- Song Recorded, Mixed & Mastered at Aura Studios Chennai, by Bob Phukan
- Sound Engineers: Saurabh Muthusami, Kathiravan & Sukriti
