= Phoenix (2025 film) =

2025 Tamil film by Anl Arasu

- Theatrical release poster
- Directed by: Anal Arasu
- Written by: Aanl Arasu
- Produced by: Rajalakshmy Anl Arasu
- Starring: Surya Sethupathi; Varsha Viswanath; Varalaxmi Sarathkumar; Devadarshini; J. Vignesh; Abi Nakshathra
- Cinematography: R. Velraj
- Edited by: Praveen K. L.
- Music by: Sam C. S.
- Production company: AK Braveman Pictures
- Release date: 4 July 2025
- Country: India
- Language: Tamil

Phoenix is a 2025 Indian Tamil-language sports action drama film written and directed by Anl Arasu and produced by Rajalakshmy Anl Arasu under AK Braveman Pictures banner. The film stars debutant Surya Sethupathi in the lead role alongside Varalaxmi Sarathkumar, Varsha Viswanath, Devadarshini and J. Vignesh in an important roles. The films stars an ensemble cast consisting of Abi Nakshatra, Sampath Raj, Muthukumar, Dileepan, Ajay Ghosh, Harish Uthaman, Munnar Ramesh, Nandha Saravanan, Aadukalam Murugadoss, Sreejith Ravi, Aadukalam Naren and others in supporting roles.

The film follows a teenage boxer accused of a high-profile political murder who is quietly sent to a juvenile reformatory, where relentless assassination attempts test his survival. As he battles for his life and identity behind bars, he must summon inner strength to confront a dangerous past and hostile enemies.

== Plot ==
At a meeting, some men talk badly about MLA Karikalan; it erupts in a scuffle, and Karikalan later buries them alive. After a few days, his wife mourns his loss at his funeral, and Surya, a young juvenile, is imprisoned for a high-profile murder and sent to a juvenile prison. Meanwhile, Ravichandran investigates the high-profile murder. Karikalan's men pay one of the hostel wardens to kill Surya. Firstly, Kutty Guna and his gang try to kill him; however, he brutally beats them up. This incident makes all other juveniles respect him. Marimuthu, Karikalan's father-in-law, tells his daughter Maya to kill Surya before the election, so Karikalan's men hire some ruthless killer juveniles from different states to kill Surya. First, they hack and kill Kaasi, the Democratic Party leader, and bring his head to a police station, and they are sent to the same juvenile prison as Surya. In another assassination attempt, the juveniles stab and attempt to kill Surya, but he defeats them. The other adolescents in the prison hide the weapons and knives that the other boys brought.

The wardens admit Surya and them to the hospital. At the hospital, the corrupt warden attends a phone call from Karikalan's henchmen in the toilet, and another warden, Murugadoss, overhears that they are going to try to kill Surya. At the magistrates', Karikalan's henchmen try to kill Surya with Molotov cocktails and stab him; however, again, he manages to escape. The wardens then see him in a room. Ravichandran meets with Surya, and Surya reveals his flashback

Past: Surya was living happily with his older brother Karna and his mother. Surya and Karna both practice MMA. In a speech, Karikalan promises a job for the winner of the upcoming MMA competition at the harbour. Karna has a relationship with a girl, Kalai. Her brother spots them at the beach. Kalai's parents speak to Karna's mother. In the MMA competition, Jagan, Karikalan's son, and Karna win all their rounds and face each other in the final. Karikalan's men ask Karna to withdraw from the match, but Surya and Karna decline, and Karna wins the final, beating Jagan. Karikalan acts hostile. Karna wins the prize money of 2 lakhs and an appointment letter for a harbour job.

At the hospital, Karikalan finds out that Jagan has been severely wounded and is losing a lot of blood. Maya tells Karikalan's men to kill Karna, so his men beat and stabbed Karna. Karna tells Kalai to go and pushes her off the bridge into the water. Kalai reaches Surya's home and tells him that Karna has been stabbed and kidnapped. Surya and his mother frantically search for Karna at the bridge but cannot find him, so they file a case with the police, where Inspector Thangaraj talks badly about Kalai. Surya's mother goes to the hospital to apologise to Karikalan; his wife Maya slaps Surya's mother. The next day, when Kalai's father goes to open the MMA academy, he sees Karna hanging, impaled by a metal hook with both hands chopped off. His mother, coach, and Surya are shocked when they see him, and Kalai cries at his dead body. She then runs off and dies after getting hit by a train. It is soon revealed that Karikalan and his men tied Karna up, and Karikalan chopped his hands off in revenge for beating up his son. At his brother's funeral, Surya picks up a aruval and brutally hacks Karikalan to death as revenge for killing his brother, shocking his men and the funeral crowd.

Present: After Karikalan's men fail to kill Surya at the court, Karikalan's second son and his friends stab and kill Karikalan's men. Later, as Karikalan's son and gang members enter the juvenile prison, Surya's friends (the adolescents originally inside the prison) stab and kill them, and in a brutal fight, it is revealed that Karikalan's second son and his friends gang raped Kalai, so Surya eventually kills him.

The news reports that Marimuthu and Maya were arrested following the scuffle.

== Cast ==
- Surya Sethupathi as Surya
- Varalaxmi Sarathkumar as Maya
- Sampath Raj as MLA Karikalan, Maya's husband
- Harish Uthaman as Ravichandran
- Devadarshini as Surya's and Karna's mother
- J. Vignesh as Karna, Surya's older brother
- Abi Nakshatra as Kalai, Karna's girlfriend
- Varsha Viswanath
- Dileepan as Karnan's coach
- Ajay Ghosh as Minister Marimuthu, Maya's father
- Aadukalam Naren as Araneriyan
- Rishi Rithvik as Dheena, Karikalan's henchman
- Nandha Saravanan as Karikalan's henchman
- Vettai Muthukumar as Kaasi, Democratic Party leader
- Aadukalam Murugadoss as Murugadoss, hostel warden
- Munnar Ramesh as Thangaraj, a police officer
- Sreejith Ravi as corrupt hostel warden
- Daffe Naveen as Karikalan's second son
- Gajaraj as Judge
- Uday Mahesh

== Production ==
In mid-June 2023, it was reported that Vijay Sethupathi's son Surya Vijay Sethupathi who had earlier appeared as child artist in films such as Naanum Rowdy Dhaan (2015) and Sindhubaadh (2019) to debut as the lead actor in the directorial debut of the stunt choreographer Anl Arasu. The film stars Ayali (2023) fame Abinakshathra and Varsha as the female leads alongside, Kaaka Muttai (2015) fame J. Vignesh in an important role. The films stars an ensemble cast consisting of Varalaxmi Sarathkumar, Sampath Raj, Devadarshini, Muthukumar, Dileepan, Ajay Ghosh, Harish Uthaman, Munnar Ramesh, Naveen, 'Atti' Rishi, Nandha Saravanan, Aadukalam Murugadoss, Sreejith Ravi, Aadukalam Naren, Sathya NJ, Poovaiyar and others in supporting roles. The film is produced by the director himself under his banner AK Braveman Pictures helmed by Rajalakshmy Anl Arasu. The technical team consists of R. Velraj as the cinematographer, Praveen K. L. as the editor, Sam C. S. as the music composer, and the director himself as the stunt choreographer. After a formal puja ceremony, the principal photography began on 24 November 2023 in AVM Studios, Chennai.

== Music ==
Phoenix

Soundtrack album by Sam C. S.
- Released: June 27, 2025
- Genre: Feature film soundtrack
- Language: Tamil
- Label: Mr. AK Muzic
- Producer: Sam C. S.

Sam C. S. chronology
Jack (2024)	Phoenix (2024)	Trending (2025)

Singles from Phoenix
- 1. "Yaaranda" Released: 25 October 2024

External audio
- Phoenix - Audio JukeBox on YouTube

The soundtrack and background are composed by Sam C.S. The first single "Yaaraanda" was released on 25 October 2024.

Track listing
No.	Title	Lyrics	Singer(s)	Length
1.	"Indha Vaangiko"	Logan	Gana Guna, Velu, Merlin
2.	"Yaar Raktham"	Madhan Karky	Sivam
3.	"Yaaranda"	Vithya Damodharan	Sivam
4.	"O Thangalaye"	Viveka	Saindhavi
5.	"Yen Uyire"	Karunakaran	Vijaynarain, Maanasi G Kannan
6.	"Yaaru Inga Veeran"	Vaaheesan	Vaaheesan

== Marketing ==
On 24 November 2023, Anl Arasu through a first-look poster confirmed his debut directorial featuring Surya Vijay Sethupathi as the male lead in his sports action drama film. The film teaser was released by Sivakarthikeyan in X on 17 June 2024 after a teaser launch event at Le Magic, Nungambakkam, where Surya's father, Vijay Sethupathi was also present. The pre-release trailer cum audio launch event was conducted in Chennai on 27 June 2025 in the presence of Vijay Sethupathi and other prominent faces like H. Vinoth and T. Siva attending the event.

== Release ==
=== Theatrical ===
Phoenix released in theatres on 4 July 2025. It had been scheduled for 14 November 2024, clashing with Kanguva, but it was postponed without immediately announcing a date, due to the cuts issued by the Central Board of Film Certification.

== Critical reception ==
Phoenix received some mixed initial reviews from critics, who praised its technical quality and the strength of its lead. Writing for The Times of India, Abhinav Subramanian gave the movie three out of five stars, saying that its "technical excellence elevate[d] the material considerably" and that it "succeed[ed] in establishing its young lead's action credentials," but lamented its predictability as its "biggest handicap." Cinema Express's Rohini M. also rated the movie three out of five, saying that "Surya Sethupathi impresse[d] in his debut" and that the movie "stood tall" in a technical and cinematographical sense.
