= Aramm =

2017 Indian Tamil film by N. Gopi Nainar

- Theatrical release poster
- Directed by: N. Gopi Nainar
- Written by: N. Gopi Nainar
- Produced by: Kotapadi J Rajesh
- Starring: Nayanthara
- Cinematography: Om Prakash
- Edited by: Ruben
- Music by: Ghibran
- Production company: KJR Studios
- Distributed by: Trident Arts
- Release date: 10 November 2017
- Running time: 119 minutes
- Country: India
- Language: Tamil
- Budget: est. ₹5 crore
- Box office: est. ₹27 crore

Aramm (transl. Virtue) is a 2017 Indian Tamil-language political drama film written and directed by N. Gopi Nainar. It features Nayanthara as a district collector, with Ramachandran Durairaj and Sunu Lakshmi in supporting roles. The music was composed by Ghibran with cinematography by Om Prakash and editing by Ruben. The film began production in mid-2016 and had a theatrical release on 10 November 2017. It received positive reviews from critics and performed well at the box office.

== Plot ==
The story begins with District Collector Madhivadhani, who is struggling for approval from a higher official and telling him a bone-chilling story.

A week ago, in Kattoor village, poor people were seen fighting with the police for clean water, sanitation, and the verdict to arrest their cruel landlord. Two boys are seen playing in a river, as their family drags them out and scolds them for playing there. The next day, a woman named Sumathi and her 4-year-old daughter Dhanshika are walking back home. Sumathi soon learns that Dhanshika went missing and enquires with the villagers, who tell her that her daughter fell into a borewell. Sumathi rushes there and faints. The villagers call the police, who in turn alert Madhivadhani. Madhivadhani and her team rush there to assess the situation but are stopped by a deep ditch in the middle of the road, which delays their arrival at the site. Madhivadhani and her team finally arrive but are battered by journalists and the media, who criticize Madhivadhani's late arrival and the landlord's negligence towards the open borewell.

Soon, a camp is set up. Sumathi, her husband Pulenthiran, and her son Muthu still await Dhanshika's escape. The police send down a camera and microphone system so that Madhivadhani can talk with Dhanshika in the borewell. Madhivadhani notices that Dhanshika is not receiving enough oxygen, but the doctors ensure that Dhanshika has enough time to survive. Meanwhile, the villagers try to rescue Dhanshika on their own but fail every time. The police decide to carry out the "butterfly knot", as they demonstrate to Madhivadhani on a dummy. Madhivadhani alerts the medical team that Dhanshika's shoulder might become dislocated, but she approves the process. As the police reach out to Dhanshika with the knot, Dhanshika tries to hold onto it, but her arm hurts, and she falls back into the borewell. Madhivadhani and the family are distraught over this.

The villagers, angry about the long time taken to rescue Dhanshika and the landlord's negligence, attack the police with stones. Madhivadhani then settles the doubt by telling the villagers that the landlord will be arrested and Dhanshika will be rescued. Coincidentally, the landlord gets arrested. Madhivadhani then calls for Captain Maharajan and his team from the Indian Defence Army. Maharajan has an idea: to dig out another horizontal tunnel to get Dhanshika out. Madhivadhani approves it. As Maharajan's team is digging, a crack appears in the ground, causing all the work to stop immediately. As the day darkens into night, the camera suddenly stops working. As the camera is fixed, Dhanshika shows no response, causing Pulenthiran to assume that she is dead. He runs off into the half-dug site while trying to rescue Dhanshika on his own, thereby causing another chaos between the villagers and the police, while someone alerts the villagers that Dhanshika is still alive. The family decides to send Muthu (Ramesh Thilaganathan), Dhanshika's brother, to rescue her, which Madhivadhani reluctantly approves. Finally, Dhanshika is rescued alive. Pulenthiran, Sumathi, Muthu, and Dhanshika thank Madhivadhani. Madhivadhani sends Dhanshika to the hospital, but she emotionally breaks down.

Back in the present, Madhivadhani competes with the higher official and resigns from her post as a district collector. She then decides to do something for her people as an ordinary person. The film then ends with a timeline slideshow of incidents of children falling into neglected borewells.

== Cast ==
- Nayanthara as District Collector Madhivadhani IAS (Voiced by Deepa Venkat)
- Ramachandran Durairaj as Pulenthiran
- Sunu Lakshmi as Sumathi
- Mahalakshmi as Dhanshika
- Kitty as Government Official
- Vela Ramamoorthy as MLA
- E. Ramdoss as Police Officer
- Jeeva Ravi as Doctor
- Vignesh as Saravanan
- Ramesh as Muthu
- Vazhakku En Muthuraman as Inspector Raghuvaran
- Raja Rani Pandian
- R. S. G. Chelladurai as Villager
- T. Siva as Minister
- Vinodhini Vaidyanathan as Nurse

== Production ==
In July 2016, it was reported that actress Nayanthara had quietly started and almost finished filming for a project where she would portray as district collector directed by newcomer Minjur Gopi. Gopi had earlier garnered media attention during the release AR Murugadoss's Kaththi (2014), where he claimed that the pair had stolen his stories to make their films. Gopi had narrated the story of Aramm, an episode from the life of a District Collector to many producers but they were reluctant to come forward and make the film. Gopi zeroed in on the Collector's part because he knew the film would be critical of the government machinery, but stated he did not assign a gender to the Collector until Nayanthara accepted to work on the film. Gopi had managed to get access to Nayanthara, after being recommended to her by director Sarkunam. The film was predominantly shot in Chennai and around Appanur near Paramakudi, with Ramesh and Vignesh of Kaaka Muttai, Ramachandran Durairaj and Sunu Lakshmi also portraying pivotal roles, while Om Prakash was assigned as the film's cinematographer. Filming work for the project was finished in early October 2016, with the film still being untitled.

The title and first look poster of the film was revealed on 18 November 2016, coinciding with Nayanthara's birthday. The team actively chose to promote the actress as the main selling point of the film, rather than the other members of the cast. Nayanthara, who usually does not take part in promotions for her film, agreed to promote the film because she felt the film had a relevant social message. Gopi also revealed that the actress was heavily involved during the making of the film and operated like an assistant director. She also prevented Gopi from making any changes to the script to cater to her fan following. During the post-production phase of the film, Ghibran worked with the City of Prague Philharmonic Orchestra to record the background score.

== Soundtrack ==
Aramm

Soundtrack album by Ghibran
- Released: 28 July 2017
- Recorded: 2017
- Length: 13:57
- Language: Tamil
- Label: Think Music
- Producer: Ghibran

Ghibran chronology
| Magalir Mattum (2017) | Aramm (2017) | Theeran Adhigaaram Ondru (2017) |

The film's music was composed by Ghibran, while the audio rights of the film were acquired by Think Music. The album was released on 28 July 2017 and featured three tracks.

Track list
| No. | Title | Lyrics | Singer(s) | Length |
|---|---|---|---|---|
| 1. | "Melam Kottudaa" | Sikkander | Gold Devaraj | 4:29 |
| 2. | "Thoranam Aayiram" | Umadevi | Vaikom Vijayalakshmi | 4:52 |
| 3. | "Pudhu Varalaare" | Umadevi | Sundarayyar | 4:36 |
| 4. | "Anaikum thuniyil" | Umadevi | Aswathi Raj | 3:24 |
| Total length: | | | | 13:57 |

== Release ==
Aramm was released on 10 November 2017 across Tamil Nadu and won positive reviews from film critics. The satellite rights of the film were sold to Sun TV.

== Reception ==
Sify's critic wrote Aramm is a "brilliant film that inspires you to wake up and react", adding it was "compelling, moving and quite unlike anything else, you're likely to watch this year". Ananda vikatan gave 60 marks to this film. Reviewer Manoj Kumar of The Indian Express called the film "hard-hitting", adding "while Nayanthara remains in forefront of the action fast developing, the narration does not deviate from its straight path to meet the approval of her star status". Similarly, a critic from The New Indian Express, called it "a powerful film that doesn't flinch from asking tough questions", while the Times of India called it "effective". Film reviewer Sreedhar Pillai of Firstpost wrote Aramm is "a triumph of honest writing", and added "Nayanthara shows why she's called Kollywood's 'Lady Superstar'". The commercial success of the film prompted Gopi Nainar to announce a sequel which would begin in 2018 with Nayanthara reprising the lead role.

== Awards ==
| Award | Category | Recipients | Result | Ref. |
|---|---|---|---|---|
| Ananda Vikatan Cinema Awards | Best Film | Aramm | Won | |
| Ananda Vikatan Cinema Awards | Best Director | Gopi Nainar | Won | |
| Ananda Vikatan Cinema Awards | Best Actress | Nayanthara | Won | |
| Norway Tamil Film Festival Awards | Best Film | Aramm | Won | |
| Norway Tamil Film Festival Awards | Best Director | Gopi Nainar | Won | |
| 10th Vijay Awards | Vijay Award for Best Actress | Nayanthara | Won | |
| 10th Vijay Awards | Vijay Award for Best Lyricist | Uma Devi | Won | |
| 10th Vijay Awards | Vijay Award for Favourite Heroine | Nayanthara | Won | |
| 65th Filmfare Awards South | Filmfare Award for Best Film - Tamil | Aramm | Won | |
| 65th Filmfare Awards South | Filmfare Award for Best Director - Tamil | Gopi Nainar | Nominated | |
| 65th Filmfare Awards South | Filmfare Award for Best Actress - Tamil | Nayanthara | Won | |
| 7th South Indian International Movie Awards | Best Film - Tamil | Aramm | Nominated | |
| 7th South Indian International Movie Awards | Best Director - Tamil | Gopi Nainar | Nominated | |
| 7th South Indian International Movie Awards | Best Actress - Tamil | Nayanthara | Won | |
| Tamil Nadu State Film Awards | Best Film | Aramm | Won | |
| Tamil Nadu State Film Awards | Best Actress | Nayanthara | Won | |
