= Pudhu Vedham =

2023 Tamil film

- Theatrical release poster
- Directed by: Rasa Vikram
- Starring: Imman Annachi; J. Vignesh; V. Ramesh
- Cinematography: Krishnan Varadha Rajan
- Edited by: Nagappan Naveenkumar
- Music by: Rabidevendran
- Production company: Vittal Movies
- Release date: 13 October 2023
- Country: India
- Language: Tamil

Pudhu Vedham (transl. New Veda) is a 2023 Indian Tamil-language film directed by Rasa Vikram and starring Imman Annachi, J. Vignesh and V. Ramesh in the lead roles. It was released on 13 October 2023.

== Cast ==
- Imman Annachi
- J. Vignesh
- V. Ramesh
- Scissor Manohar
- Varunika Lavanya

== Production ==
Varunika Lavanya of Sri Lankan Tamil heritage made her acting debut through the film.

== Reception ==
The film was released on 13 October 2023 across theatres in Tamil Nadu. A critic from Maalai Malar gave the film a negative review, noting that the "screenplay was disappointing". In contrast, a reviewer from Dina Thanthi noted that the filmmaker was able to combine "love, friendship and family" well.
