= AV Prafullachandra =

Indian music composer

- Citizenship: Indian
- Occupations: Music director; music producer; singer; lyricist
- Years active: 2014–present

AV Prafullachandra is an Indian music composer who primarily works in Marathi films. He began his career with Photocopy (2016) and composed the music for popular films like Dhurala (2020), Godavari (2021), Ghar Banduk Biryani (2023), Naal 2 (2023), Jarann (2025), Dashavatar (2025).

== Discography (music director) ==
=== Film ===
Year	Film	Notes	Ref(s)
2016	Photocopy	Lyrics of "Pipaani" and "Lagbag Sakharpudyachi", Playback singer for "Lagbag Sakharpudyachi"	
2017	Zala Bobhata		
2018	Naal	Composed "Jau De Na Va" song	
2019	Kaagar		
2020	Dhurala		
2020	Kesari		
2020	Make Up	Short film	
2021	Jhoom	TV mini series	
2021	Karkhanisanchi Waari: Ashes on a road trip		
2022	Godavari		
2022	Bebhaan	Composed "Bebhan Zalo Mi" song	
2023	Ghar Banduk Biryani		
2023	Naal 2		
2025	Jarann		
2025	Dashavatar		
2026	Bol Bol Rani		
2026	Kapuskonda		

=== Television ===
Year	Title	Notes	Ref(s)
2014-2016	Jai Malhar	Only 1 song "Banubaya"	
2014	Zee Marathi Title Song		
2016	Ratris Khel Chale	Background score	
2016–2019	Tujhyat Jeev Rangala		
2017–2019	Lagira Zala Ji	Theme music composer	
2019–2020	Mrs. Mukhyamantri		
2022	Crash Course		

=== Web series ===
Year	Title	Notes	Ref(s)
2022	RaanBaazaar	Lyricist	

=== Music video ===
Chandu Shikari

== Awards and nominations ==
Year	Award	Category	Nominated work	Result	Ref(s)
2017	Filmfare Awards Marathi	Best Music Director	Zala Bobhata	Nominated	
2021	Filmfare Awards Marathi	Best Background Score	Dhurala	Won	
2021	Filmfare Awards Marathi	Best Music Director	Dhurala	Nominated	
2021	Filmfare Awards Marathi	Best Music Director	Karkhanisanchi Waari: Ashes on a road trip	Nominated	
2024	Filmfare Awards Marathi	Best Music Director	Naal 2	Nominated	
2022	Filmfare Awards Marathi	Best Background Score	Godavari	Won	
2022	Pune International Film Festival	Best Music Special Jury Prize	Godavari	Won	
2022	Pravah Picture Awards	Best Background Score	Godavari	Won	
2023	Zee Chitra Gaurav Puraskar	Best Background Score	Godavari	Won	
