= Treesha Thosar =

Indian child actress

- Born: Treesha Vivek Thosar
- Occupation: Actress
- Years active: 2023–present
- Known for: Naal 2
- Awards: National Film Award for Best Child Artist

Treesha Thosar is an Indian child actress known for her work in Marathi cinema. She made her debut with Marathi film Naal 2, for which she received the National Film Award for Best Child Artist, becoming the youngest National Award winner.

== Career ==
Treesha acted in Naal 2 at just three years old. At the age of four, she won the National Film Award for Best Child Artist at the 71st National Film Awards for her role as Chimi in Naal 2, becoming the youngest National Award recipient and surpassing the record previously held by Kamal Haasan, who received the honour at the age of six. She first gained public attention through the television serial Aai Tuljabhavani in 2024. She then acted in the crime series Manvat Murders, which is based on ghastly murders that occurred in the Marathwada region of Maharashtra in the early 1970s.

In 2025, she starred alongside Siddharth Jadhav, Mohan Agashe, and Rohini Hattangadi in the Marathi comedy crime thriller Aatli Baatmi Futli. She later acted in Mahesh Manjrekar's drama film Punha Shivaji Raje Bhosale. She will next star in the Hindi heist thriller film The Great Escape Faraar alongside Nawazuddin Siddiqui.

== Filmography ==
=== Film ===
Key
†	Denotes films that have not yet been released

Year	Film	Role	Notes	Ref.
2023	Naal 2	Revati "Chimni" Lokhande	Debut; Won National Film Award for Best Child Artist	
2025	Aatli Baatmi Futli	Meenu		
2025	Punha Shivajiraje Bhosale	Rakhma		
TBA	The Great Escape Faraar †	Mansi Verma	Hindi film	

=== Television ===
Year	Title	Role	Notes	Ref.
2024	Aai Tuljabhavani	Young Tuljabhavani		
2024	Manwat Murders	Anita Kulkarni		

== Awards ==
Year	Award	Category	Nominated work	Result	Ref.
2024	Zee Chitra Gaurav Puraskar	Best Child Artist	Naal 2	Won	
2024	8th Filmfare Awards Marathi	Best Child Artist	Naal 2	Won	
2025	71st National Film Awards	Best Child Artist	Naal 2	Won	
