= Malhar (film) =

2024 Indian film

- Theatrical release poster
- Directed by: Vishal Kumbhar
- Written by: Siddharth Salvi; Vishal Kumbhar; Apurva Patil
- Produced by: Praful Pasad
- Starring: Shrinivas Pokale; Vinayak Potdar; Sharib Hashmi; Anjali Patil
- Cinematography: Ganesh Kamble
- Edited by: Akshay Kumar
- Music by: T. Satish; Sarang Kulkarni
- Production company: V Motion Pictures
- Release date: 7 June 2024
- Country: India
- Languages: Hindi; Marathi

Malhar is an Indian bilingual drama film released in Hindi and Marathi languages directed by Vishal Kumbhar and starring Srinivas Pokale, Sharib Hashmi, Anjali Patil, Rishi Saxena, Vinayak Potdar, Mohammed Samad, and Akshata Acharya. This is produced by Praful Pasad.

== Cast ==
- Shrinivas Pokale as Bhairav
- Vinayak Potdar as Javed
- Sharib Hashmi as Mohan
- Anjali Patil as Kesar
- Rishi Saxena as Laxman
- Mohammad Samad as Jatin
- Akshata Acharya as Jasmin

== Plot ==
This collection of three interconnected stories takes place in the same village. In a remote, isolated community in Kutch, The story of this movie centers on the battle between two closest friends to have their broken hearing aid fixed. Jasmine, Javed's older sister, develops feelings for the Hindu man Jatin. The plot develops around their struggle to get together, how they leave the village to meet, their love, and the difficulties they encounter. Kesar, a recently married woman. The son of that village's sarpanch, Laxman, is her husband. She doesn't conceive after a few days of marriage, which is why her in-laws are always condemning her and how she escapes it.

== Release ==
The film was theatrically released on 7 June 2024 in Marathi and Hindi languages. Earlier, the film was scheduled to be released on 31 May 2024.

== Reception ==
=== Critical reception ===
Dhaval Roy of The Times of India rated 3.5/5 and wrote "the film excels at balancing heartwarming moments with poignant realities, the pacing falters slightly in the second half. However this is a miner blip in an otherwise enriching journey that deserves to be experienced on the big screen. Abhilasha Rawat of Times Now rated 3.0/5 and wrote "Malhar is a film that deserves to be experienced on the big screen, offering a blend of heartfelt storytelling and social commentary that resonates long after the credits roll." Mahpara Kabir of ABP News wrote "'Malhar' intricately weaves together three interconnected storylines. Despite the complexity of narrating multiple tales within a single film, the director's adeptness shines through."
