= Rimdogittanga =

Indian drama film

- Directed by: Dominic Sangma
- Written by: Dominic Sangma
- Starring: Handam R. Marak; Balsrame A. Sangma; Torikhu A. Sangma; Celestine K. Sangma
- Cinematography: Tojo Xavier
- Production companies: Anna Films; Uncombed Buddha; Joicy Studio
- Release date: 2023
- Running time: 127 minutes
- Countries: India; China; Switzerland; Qatar; Netherlands
- Language: Garo

Rimdogittanga (English title: Rapture) is a 2023 Garo-language independent drama film written and directed by Dominic Sangma. A co-production between India, China, Switzerland, Qatar, and the Netherlands, the film explores themes of communal paranoia, religious prophecy, and rural life in the Garo Hills of Meghalaya.

In September 2025, the film was awarded the National Film Award for Best Feature Film in Garo at the 71st National Film Awards.

== Synopsis ==
Set in a remote village in Meghalaya, the narrative is told through the perspective of Kasan, a ten-year-old boy who suffers from night blindness. The village is gripped by an escalating sense of dread following the disappearance of local children and rumors of "kidnappers" lurking in the forest. As the community seeks spiritual protection through the local church and the arrival of a statue of the Virgin Mary, the film examines the intersection of folklore, organized religion, and the mass hysteria that begins to target outsiders.

== Reception ==
The Indian Express described the film as a "microcosm for the entire country," praising its unflinching look at ethno-religious conflict. Reviewers noted the film's "haunting" cinematography and its use of magic realism to depict the psychological state of a community under fear.

== Awards ==
Year	Award	Category	Result	Ref
2025	71st National Film Awards	Best Feature Film in Garo	Won	
