= Mau: The Spirit Dreams of Cheraw =

Indian Mizo-language documentary film

- Directed by: Shilpika Bordoloi
- Produced by: Shilpika Bordoloi
- Starring: Shilpika Bordoloi
- Cinematography: Sumedha Bhattacharyya
- Edited by: Sagarika Debnath
- Music by: Padmanābhan J
- Release date: 21 November 2023
- Running time: 52 minutes
- Country: India
- Language: Mizo-language

Mau: The Spirit Dreams of Cheraw is a 2023 Indian Mizo-language documentary film directed and produced by Shilpika Bordoloi. The film explores the cultural and ritualistic history of the Cheraw dance of Mizoram, specifically its connection to maternal mortality and the ecological phenomenon of bamboo flowering.

The film received the Best Debut Film of a Director (Non-Feature) at the 71st National Film Awards. It was also selected for the Indian Panorama section at the 54th International Film Festival of India.

== Synopsis ==
The documentary uses an ethnographic approach to trace the origins of the Cheraw, popularly known as the "bamboo dance." While contemporary interpretations of the dance are celebratory, the film documents its traditional roots as a ritual performed to guide the soul of a mother who died during childbirth. The narrative parallels human grief with the life cycle of the Melocanna baccifera (locally known as Mau), a bamboo species in Mizoram that flowers once every 48 years and subsequently dies, a phenomenon known as Mautam.

== Awards ==
Year	Award	Category	Recipient	Result
2023	71st National Film Awards	Best Debut Film of a Director (Non-Feature)	Shilpika Bordoloi	Won
2023	Chalachitram National Film Festival	Best Cinematography	Sumedha Bhattacharyya	Won
2024	Northeast International Documentary and Film Festival	Best North East Special Award	Mau: The Spirit Dreams of Cheraw	Won
