= Aatli Baatmi Futli =

2025 Indian Marathi film

- Directed by: Vishal P Gandhi; Jainesh Ijarda
- Screenplay by: Jeevak Ambadas Muntode; Amman Advani; Jainesh Ijarda; Vishal P Gandhi
- Story by: Jainesh Ijarda
- Produced by: Grieshma Advani; Vishal P Gandhi; Amman Advani
- Starring: Rohini Hattangadi; Mohan Agashe; Siddharth Jadhav; Vijay Nikam; Bharat Ganeshpure
- Cinematography: Amit Suresh Kodoth
- Edited by: Ravi Chauhan
- Music by: Agnel Roman
- Production company: Veejee Films
- Release date: September 19, 2025 (India)
- Country: India
- Language: Marathi

Aatli Baatmi Futli (transl. The news has broken now) is a 2025 Indian Marathi-language mystery thriller directed by Vishal P. Gandhi and Jinesh Ijardar, produced by Vishal P. Gandhi and Grieshma Advani under Veejee Films. The movie is written by Ijardar, Gandhi along with Jeevak Muntonde and Amman Advani.

== Plot ==
Sachin (Siddharth Jadhav), an autorickshaw driver, discovers an abandoned little girl in his vehicle and decides to raise her as his own. The child suffers from a serious heart condition that requires costly surgery to survive. Desperate to save her, Sachin resorts to stealing money from a bank. On his way back to the hospital, he unexpectedly finds himself in the home of an elderly couple living in a chawl.

To his shock, the husband, Bhaskar Wankhede (Dr. Mohan Agashe), is plotting to kill his wife, Savita (Rohini Hattangady). Soon, it becomes clear that Bhaskar also wishes to end his own life. The situation presents a striking contrast: while Sachin is fighting against all odds to preserve his daughter's life, the old couple is determined to bring theirs to an end.

The story leaves us with haunting questions: Will the Wankhedes carry out their plan? And will Sachin succeed in saving the little girl he has come to love as his own?

== Cast ==
- Mohan Agashe as Bhaskar Wankhede
- Rohini Hattangadi as Savita Wankhede
- Siddharth Jadhav as Sachin
- Vijay Nikam as Tiger Bhai
- Bharat Ganeshpure as Police Inspector Gore
- Ananda Karekar as Patil Kaka
- Pritam Kagne as Lalita
- Treesha Thosar as Meenu
- Amol Kagne as Amol
- Amir Tadwalkar as Simon

== Release ==
The film was theatrically released on 19 September 2025.

== Reception ==
Nandini Ramnath of Scroll.in wrote "the 114-minute movie lacks the smartness needed to carry off what could have been an interesting comedy of errors. There isn’t enough comedy and far too many errors while following two intersecting plot strands: Sachin’s plight, and the couple’s situation."

A review at Film Information was critical of the overall production and only mildly praised the music. The review mentioned "Jainesh Ijardar’s story is neither too convincing nor too engaging. Except for the shocking ending, it doesn’t quite appeal. The screenplay, written by Jeevak Muntode, Amman Advani, Jainesh Ijardar and Vishal P. Gandhi, is quite weak, especially in the first half. The attempt to tickle the funny bone is disastrous as the light moments simply fail to make the viewers laugh. The drama after interval is better but only at times. However, even the post-interval portion is unable to move the viewers emotionally. Climax is definitely good and has shock value. Jeevak Muntode and Adwait Karambelkar’s dialogues are okay; they should’ve been more hard-hitting".
