= God Vulture and Human =

Indian national award recipient documentary film

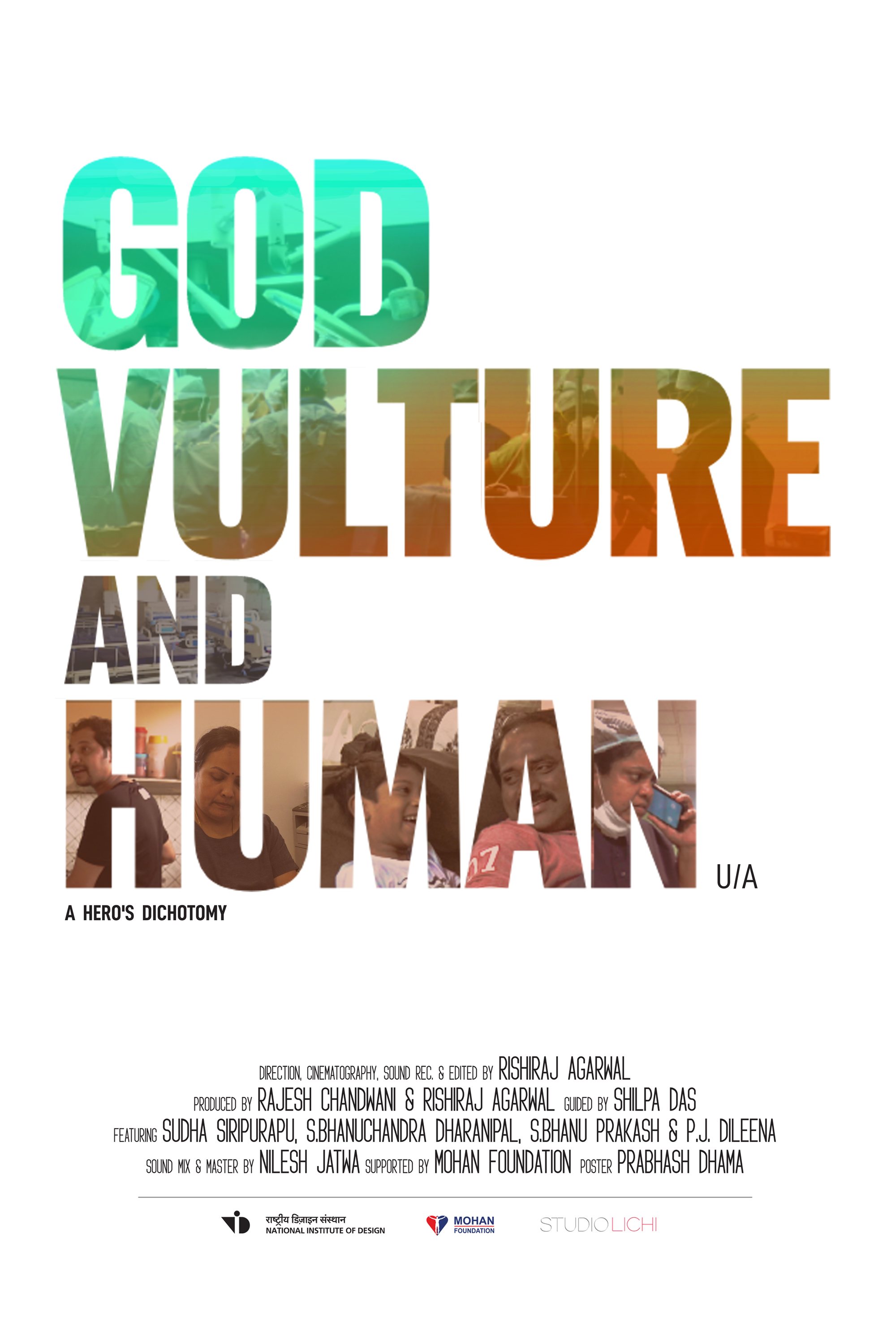
- Public release poster for the documentary God Vulture and Human
- Directed by: Rishiraj Agarwal
- Produced by: Studio Lichi, Rajesh Chandwani
- Cinematography: Rishiraj Agarwal
- Edited by: Rishiraj Agarwal
- Production company: Studio Lichi
- Release date: 2023
- Country: India
- Languages: English, Hindi, Telugu

God Vulture and Human is an Indian documentary film directed by Rishiraj Agarwal and co-produced by Dr. Rajesh Chandwani and Studio Lichi. The film received the National Film Award for Best Documentary at the 71st National Film Awards.

== Plot ==
The documentary is about the role of organ transplant coordinators (or transplant counsellors) in the process of cadaver organ donation and transplantation.

== Production ==
The production of this documentary film started as Rishiraj's graduation film project in Master of Design (M.Des.) programme at National Institute of Design, Ahmedabad. It was developed with collaboration of Indian Institute of Management Ahmedabad and the NGO MOHAN Foundation.

== See also ==
- Organ donation in India
- National Film Awards
