= Flowering Man =

Indian Hindi-language short film

- Directed by: Soumyajit Ghosh Dastidar
- Written by: Soumyajit Ghosh Dastidar
- Produced by: Film and Television Institute of India
- Starring: Rajeev Gaursingh; Tanishka Meesala
- Production company: Film and Television Institute of India (FTII)
- Release date: 2023
- Running time: 24 minutes
- Country: India
- Language: Hindi

Flowering Man is a 2023 Indian Hindi-language short film directed by Soumyajit Ghosh Dastidar and produced by the Film and Television Institute of India (FTII). The film follows a teenage girl grappling with the transformation of her parent, portrayed through surreal imagery. It won the Best Non-Feature Film award at the 71st National Film Awards.

== Cast ==
- Rajeev Gaursingh as Shashi
- Tanishka Meesala as the daughter

== Plot ==
Flowering Man centres on Shashi, a parent who begins to undergo a mysterious transformation in which a flowering plant grows from their mouth. The story is presented largely from the perspective of Shashi's teenage daughter, who struggles to understand and accept the changes in her parent. Rather than depicting the transformation through direct dialogue or explanation, the narrative relies on metaphor and fragmented memories. As the story progresses, the daughter gradually confronts feelings of confusion, grief, and acceptance while attempting to reconcile the person she once knew with the parent's evolving identity.

== Awards ==
In 2025, the film won the Best Non-Feature Film award at the 71st National Film Awards.

== See also ==
- Film and Television Institute of India
- National Film Awards
