= Naal 2 =

- Theatrical release poster
- Directed by: Sudhakar Reddy Yakkanti
- Written by: Nagraj Manjule (dialogue)
- Screenplay by: Sudhakar Reddy Yakkanti
- Story by: Sudhakar Reddy Yakkanti
- Produced by: Nagraj Manjule; Sudhakar Reddy Yakkanti; Zee Studios
- Starring: Shrinivas Pokale; Nagraj Manjule; Devika Daftardar; Deepti Devi; Jitendra Joshi; Somnath Awghade
- Cinematography: Sudhakar Reddy Yakkanti
- Edited by: Sanchari Das Mollik
- Music by: AV Prafullachandra; Advait Nemlekar (background music)
- Production companies: Aatpat Production; Zee Studios
- Distributed by: Zee Studios
- Release date: 10 November 2023
- Running time: 117 minutes
- Country: India
- Language: Marathi

Naal 2 (English: Bond) is a 2023 Indian Marathi-language drama film written and directed by Sudhakar Reddy Yakkanti, and produced by Nagraj Manjule under the banner Aatpat Production and Zee Studios. It serves as a sequel to the 66th National Film Awards winner 2018 film Naal. The film stars an ensemble cast of Shrinivas Pokale, Nagraj Manjule, Devika Daftardar, Deepti Devi and Jitendra Joshi. Naal 2 won the National Film Award for Best Children's Film at the 71st National Film Awards.

== Plot ==
Chaitu (Shrinivas Pokale) visits his native village along with his foster parents, Shankar (Nagraj Manjule) and Sumi (Devika Daftardar). During the visit, he is reunited with his biological parents, Ajinath Lokhande (Jitendra Joshi) and Parvati (Deepti Devi), as well as his elder brother, Mani (Bhargav Jagtap), and younger sister, Chimi (Trisha Thosar).

Chimi struggles to accept Chaitu as part of the family, while Mani, who is developmentally delayed, forms a different bond with him. Alongside this, the narrative also explores the lives and interactions of Shankar's sister and two brothers, adding another dimension to the family dynamic.

== Cast ==
- Shrinivas Pokale as Chaitanya "Chaitya" Bhosale
- Treesha Thosar as Chimi aka Revati Lokhande
- Bhargav Jagtap as Mani Lokhande
- Nagraj Manjule as Shankar Bhosale
- Devika Daftardar as Sumi Bhosale
- Deepti Devi as Parvati Lokhande
- Jitendra Joshi as Ajinath Lokhande
- Somnath Awghade as Special appearance

== Production ==
In September 2022, Nagraj Manjule announced sequel "Naal 2". On 1 October 2022, principal photography started, teaser released on 9 October 2023.

== Soundtrack ==
Naal 2

Soundtrack album by AV Prafullachandra
- Released: 13 November 2023
- Recorded: 2022
- Genre: Feature film soundtrack
- Length: 28:44
- Language: Marathi
- Label: Zee Music Company

AV Prafullachandra chronology
Ghar Banduk Biryani (2023)	Naal 2 (2023)	TBA

Official audio
- Naal 2 - Full Album on YouTube

The songs are composed by AV Prafullachandra and the lyrics are penned by Vaibhav Deshmukh. The first song titled "Bhingori" was released on 19 October 2023 and Second song titled "Darav Darav" was released on 30 October 2023.

Track listing
No.	Title	Singer(s)	Length
1.	"Bhingori"	Master Avan, Kadubai Kharat, Manish Rajgire, Nagesh Morvekar	3:59
2.	"Darav Darav"	Jayesh Khare, Master Avan	3:23
3.	"Godi Hi Dostichi"	Gauri Gosavi	4:28
4.	"Darav Darav (Reprise)"	Padmanabh Gaikwad, Master Avan	3:26
5.	"Darav Darav (Endscroll Version)"	Padmanabh Gaikwad	3:40
6.	"The Desire"	Gauri Gosavi, Swara Joshi, Anaya Desai, Palakshi Dixit	4:53
7.	"The Wishing Well"	Master Avan	5:05
Total length:			28:54

== Reception ==
Nandini Ramnath from Scroll.in wrote "Shreenivas Pokale and Bhargav Jagtap have a compelling lack of self-consciousness, which lends credibility to their individual and shared moments. Treesha Thosar is so delightful that her occasionally overstated precocity is forgiven". Akhilesh Nerlekar from Loksatta wrote "In this episode, a very sweet story of the relationship between Chaitya and his sister Revati i.e. Chimi is presented to us. Like mother and child, the relationship between brother and sister is very pure, it does not matter whether it is blood or not. This very thing is very well shown in this second part". Devendra Jadhav from Sakal says "Siblings who save each other's lives as children grow up to be on top of each other's evil. So Naal Part 2 forces us to look within ourselves once again. Once again an innocent world stands before the eyes. And we revel in it for a moment. Bass! This is the success of Naal part 2". Kalpeshraj Kubal from The Times of India said, "Sudhakar has created a world that is full of innocence and emotions with this film. The first half hampers the flow of the film but the second part hits a homerun, making Naal 2 a good watch this weekend".

Komal Nahta from Film Information wrote "Advait Nemlekar’s background music is impactful. Sudhakar Reddy Yakkanti’s camerawork is splendid. Neeraj Singh’s production designing is so-so. Sanchari Das Moulik’s editing is quite sharp". A reviewer of Nava Bharat wrote "In today's hectic life, if you want to watch a movie with a calm, moderate and simple but equally touching plot, you must watch Naal 2". Abhishek Khule from Maharashtra Times wrote "Watch this movie and decide for yourself. All in all, this masterpiece is visually pleasing and a good story to be enjoyed by the whole family".

The film received 11 nominations at the 8th Filmfare Awards Marathi, including Filmfare Award for Best Supporting Actress – Marathi, Filmfare Award for Best Cinematographer – Marathi (Reddy), Filmfare Award for Best Screenplay – Marathi, Filmfare Award for Best Music Director – Marathi and Filmfare Award for Best Female Playback Singer – Marathi and won Four awards: Filmfare Award for Best Supporting Actor – Marathi, Filmfare Critics Award for Best Film – Marathi and Best Child Artist.

== Accolades ==
Year	Award	Category	Nominee(s)	Result	Ref.
2024	Filmfare Awards Marathi	Best Supporting Actress	Deepti Devi	Nominated	
2024	Filmfare Awards Marathi	Best Supporting Actor	Jitendra Joshi	Won	
2024	Filmfare Awards Marathi	Best Music Director	A.V. Prafullchandra	Nominated	
2024	Filmfare Awards Marathi	Best Male Playback Singer	Jayesh Khare & Master Avan for "Darav Darav"	Nominated	
2024	Filmfare Awards Marathi	Best Female Playback Singer	Kadubai Kharat for "Bhingori"	Nominated	
2024	Filmfare Awards Marathi	Critics Best Film	Sudhakar Reddy Yakkanti	Won	
2024	Filmfare Awards Marathi	Best Story	Sudhakar Reddy Yakkanti	Nominated	
2024	Filmfare Awards Marathi	Best Screenplay	Sudhakar Reddy Yakkanti	Nominated	
2024	Filmfare Awards Marathi	Best Cinematography	Sudhakar Reddy Yakkanti	Nominated	
2024	Filmfare Awards Marathi	Best Sound Design	Anthony Rubaan	Nominated	
2024	Filmfare Awards Marathi	Best Background Score	Advait Nemalekar	Nominated	
2024	Filmfare Awards Marathi	Best Child Artist	Shrinivas Pokale	Won	
2024	Filmfare Awards Marathi	Best Child Artist	Treesha Thosar	Won	
2024	Maharashtracha Favourite Kon?	Favourite Film	Naal 2	Nominated	
2024	Maharashtracha Favourite Kon?	Favourite Director	Sudhakar Reddy Yakkanti	Nominated	
2024	Maharashtracha Favourite Kon?	Favourite Supporting Actor	Nagraj Manjule	Won	
2024	Maharashtracha Favourite Kon?	Favourite Supporting Actor	Jitendra Joshi	Nominated	
2024	Maharashtracha Favourite Kon?	Favourite Supporting Actress	Devika Daftardar	Nominated	
2024	Maharashtracha Favourite Kon?	Favourite Supporting Actress	Deepti Devi	Nominated	
2024	Maharashtracha Favourite Kon?	Favourite Writer	Sudhakar Reddy Yakkanti	Nominated	
2025	Maharashtra State Film Awards	Best Film III	Naal 2	Won	
2025	Maharashtra State Film Awards	Best Social Film	Naal 2	Nominated	
2025	Maharashtra State Film Awards	Best Director III	Sudhakar Reddy Yakkanti	Won	
2025	Maharashtra State Film Awards	Best Social Film Director	Sudhakar Reddy Yakkanti	Nominated	
2025	Maharashtra State Film Awards	Best Story	Sudhakar Reddy Yakkanti	Won	
2025	Maharashtra State Film Awards	Best Child Artist	Treesha Thosar	Won	
2025	Maharashtra State Film Awards	Best Song	Vaibhav Deshmukh for "Bhingori"	Won	
2025	Maharashtra State Film Awards	Best Background Music	Advait Nemlekar	Won	
2025	Maharashtra State Film Awards	Best Music Director	AV Prafullchandra	Nominated	
2025	Maharashtra State Film Awards	Special Encouragement Award	Bhargav Jagtap	Won	
