= Sambhaji Sasane =

Indian actor

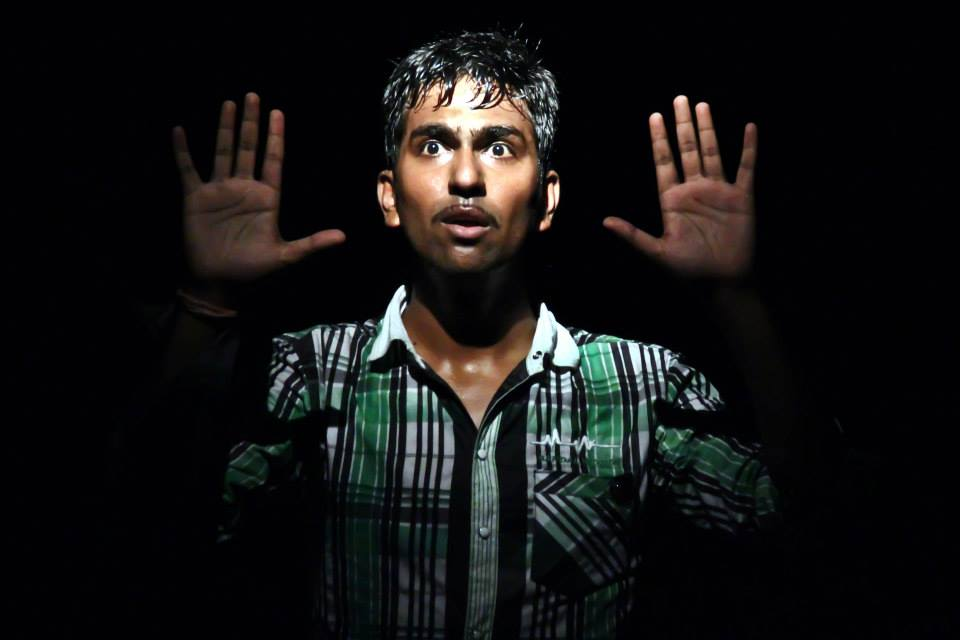
Sambhaji Sasane

Sambhaji Sasane is an Indian actor known for his work in Marathi and Hindi cinema as well as web series. He gained recognition for portraying Suraj in the Marathi film Rubaab and Papdya in the BhadiPa web series B.E. Rojgaar. In 2026 he appeared in the Marathi suspense film Bol Bol Rani alongside Sai Tamhankar, Chinmay Mandlekar and Subodh Bhave, portraying three distinct characters. His performance across multiple roles gained him further recognition in reviews of the film.

== Early life and education ==
Sasane was brought up in the Hirabag slums in Pune, Maharashtra. He began performing in street theatre during Ganpati festival celebrations in his locality, while participating in street plays on social themes. He holds a postgraduate degree in Computer Science from Fergusson College, Pune.

=== Theatre and early work ===
Sasane worked backstage with theatre groups in Pune and Mumbai before appearing in stage roles. He moved to Mumbai in 2012 and attended a workshop with theatre practitioner Yuki Ellias. He was a scholarship student in the first batch (2013–14) of the Drama School Mumbai, and has performed at venues including Prithvi Theatre, Ranga Shankara and Ninasam.

In 2014 he performed the solo play Hodi, directed by Harish Kulkarni, and played the title role in a Hindi production of Molière's Tartuffe, directed by Daniel Goldman; reviewing the play, The Times of India described his performance as that of "a great comical villain". He later appeared in Muktidham, directed by Abhishek Majumdar, and in the Bengaluru-based Indian Ensemble production Algorithms, in which he portrayed multiple characters including a cab driver and a salesman. Since 2022 he has performed multiple characters in Love & Lavani, directed by Bhushan Korgaonkar.

=== Film and web series ===
During his early screen career, Sasane appeared in supporting and character roles in Marathi, Hindi and English-language films including Love & Shukla (2017), Wagherya (2018), Letters and Lalbatti.

He gained wider attention as Papdya in the Marathi web series B.E. Rojgaar (2022), produced by BhadiPa, which follows engineering graduates navigating unemployment in contemporary India. For this role, Sasane was nominated for Best Actor at the Maharashtra Times MaTa Sanman Awards in 2023.

In 2026, Sasane played the lead role of Suraj in the Marathi romantic drama Rubaab, directed by Shekhar Bapu Rankhambe and produced by Zee Studios and Zankar Films. Sasane had initially been rejected at auditions for the film before being cast in the lead roles. In an interview with The Times of India, he spoke about performing the film's action sequences, including sustaining real hits while filming fight scenes. The film had a theatrical run and was subsequently released on ZEE5.

Later in 2026, he appeared in the Marathi suspense film Bol Bol Rani, directed by Sid Vinsurkar, alongside Sai Tamhankar, Subodh Bhave and Chinmay Mandlekar, playing three characters — Lohar, Shahir and Dravya. The film, based on a 1970s stage story by Dombivli writer Bhalchandra Sule, marked the second time collaboration between Tamhankar, and Sasane who had appeared together in the hit Marathi web series BERojgaar. The film was released theatrically on 17 July 2026.

== Filmography ==
=== Films ===
Key
†	Denotes films that have not yet been released

Year	Film	Role	Language
2017	Letters	Soldier	English
2017	Love & Shukla	Sunil	Hindi
2022	Lalbatti	Prakash Thube	Marathi
2023	Wagherya	Sam	Marathi
2026	Rubaab	Suraj	Marathi
2026	Bol Bol Rani	Dravya / Lohar / Shahir	Marathi

=== Web series ===
Year	Series	Role	Language
2022	B.E. Rojgaar	Papdya	Marathi

== Theatre ==
Year	Title	Role	Language	Director	Notes / Ref.
2014	Hodi	Solo performer	Marathi	Harish Kulkarni	Solo play
2014	Tartuffe	Tartuffe	Hindi	Daniel Goldman	
2017	Muktidham	Ensemble	Hindi	Abhishek Majumdar	—
2018	Algorithms	Cab driver, salesman	Bhojpuri / Kannada / English	Chanakya Vyas	
2022–present	Love & Lavani	Multiple characters	Hindi / Marathi	Bhushan Korgaonkar	

== Awards and nominations ==
Year	Award	Category	Work	Result
2023	MaTa Sanman Awards	Best Actor	B.E. Rojgaar	Nominated
