= Apurva Motiwale =

Indian film editor

- Born: 3 December 1985 (age 40); Indore, India
- Occupation: Film editor
- Years active: 2008 – present

Apurva Motiwale is an Indian editor, who works in Hindi, Marathi and Telugu cinema. As a frequent collaborator with Ashish Mhatre, she has edited more than 40 films. Her first film as an editor was Ajab Lagnachi Gajab Goshta (2010).

== Career ==
Apurva started her career as an assistant editor with the films Mumbai Meri Jaan in 2008, Harishchandrachi Factory in 2009 and Chillar Party 2011. She edited milestone films like Duniyadari, Ye Re Ye Re Paisa (2018). She received MICTA, International Marathi Film Festival Awards and Sanskruti Kala Darpan Awards for best editing for the film Duniyadari, and the Zee Marathi Gaurav Award for Ye Re Ye Re Paisa (2018).

== Awards ==
Award Show	Title	Film
MICTA	Best Editor	Duniyadari
Sanskruti Kala Darpan	Best Editor	Duniyadari
Zee Marathi Guarav	Best Editor	Ye Re Ye Re Paisa
Saakal Premiere Awards	Best Chief Editor	Khari Biscuit

== Filmography ==
=== Marathi ===
- Ajab Lagnachi Gajab Gosth
- Zakaas
- Sanshay Kallol
- Duniyadari
- Vakratund Mahakay
- Pyar Wali Love Story
- Lokmanya Ek Yug Purush
- Balkadu
- Kaakan
- Online Binline
- TuHiRe
- Katyar Kaljat Ghusali
- Guru
- One Way Ticket
- Vithhala Shappath
- Chaand Priticha
- Ye Re Ye Re Paisa
- Lagn Mubarak
- Pushpak Viman
- Ani Dr Kashinath Ghanekar
- Thackeray
- Sarv Line Vyast Ahet
- Mi Pan Sachin
- Luckee
- Surr Sapata
- 15 August
- Khari Biscuit
- Asha
- Tula Pahata
- Bol Bol Rani

=== Hindi ===
- Thackeray
- Mastram
- Luv Shuv Tey Chicken Khurana
- Purani Jeans
- Adipurush

=== Telugu ===
- Adipurush(Dubbed)

=== Short film ===
- Quarter by Navjyot Bandiwadekar
- Anekant
- Adnyat
- Dry Dreams
- Fuddu Boys
- Mohan Mutton
