= Rubaab =

2026 Indian film by Shekhar Rankhambe

- Theatrical release poster
- Directed by: Shekhar Rankhambe
- Written by: Shekhar Rankhambe
- Produced by: Sanjay Zankar; Gouri Zankar
- Starring: Sambhaji Sasane; Shital Patil
- Cinematography: Amol Salunke
- Edited by: Saorabh Prabhudesai
- Music by: Chinar-Mahesh
- Production companies: Zee Studios; Zankar Films
- Release date: 6 February 2026
- Running time: 150 minutes
- Country: India
- Language: Marathi

Rubaab (transl. Royal Attitude) is a 2026 Indian Marathi-language romantic-drama film directed by Shekhar Rankhambe in his directorial debut and produced by Zankar Films and Zee Studios. It stars Sambhaji Sasane and Shital Patil in lead roles.

== Cast ==
- Sambhaji Sasane as Suraj
- Shital Patil as Vaishali
- Vishal Shirtode as Ravi
- Bhushan Manjule as Sayabya
- Simran Khedkar as Madhuri
- Abhijeet Sakate as Manoj
- Prafulla Kambale as Suraj's father
- Jayashree Patil as Suraj's mother
- Pramod Kale as Vaishali's father
- Sadhana Mali as Vaishali's mother
- Gauri Deshpande as Manisha
- Kuldip Devkule as Madhuri's father

== Release ==
The film was theatrically released on 6 February 2026.

It was digitally released on ZEE5.

== Reception ==
Kalpeshraj Kubal of Maharashtra Times rated 3/5 stars, observes that Rankhambe has presented the story honestly and subtly, but the screenplay loses pace at times, becoming slow and repetitive, and could have benefited from tighter editing; however, the strong pre-climax and climax elevate the film and give the love story a distinctive touch.

Santosh Bhingarde of Sakal gave 3/5 stars and wrote "Sambhaji Sasane played Suraj perfectly! The entire cast including Sheetal Patil put in great performances and Vishal Shiratode was wonderful as well. I thought the dialogue was very current and youthful in nature. The first half of the movie was really captivating; however, it lost some of that drive in the second half of the film. Overall, this film is a very confident and self-respecting love story."
