= J. Vignesh =

Indian child actor

- Born: J. Vignesh; Chennai, Tamil Nadu, India
- Occupation: Actor
- Years active: 2015–present
- Known for: Kaaka Muttai
- Awards: National Film Award for Best Child Artist

J. Vignesh, also credited as Kaakkaa Muttai Vignesh is an Indian child actor who works in Tamil-language films.

== Career ==
When casting for Kaaka Muttai (2015), director M. Manikandan picked Vignesh, hailing from the fishermen community, for a leading role in the film. He was spotted in Kasimedu playing in a slum near the beach, when he was photographed by Manikandan - who then later approached his parents. The film's storyline revolves around two slum children of Chennai, whose desire is to taste a pizza, with Vignesh and fellow newcomer Ramesh cast as brothers. The film opened to widespread critical acclaim praising the performances of the cast members, storyline, screenplay, direction and other major technical aspects. It was further considered one of the "25 Greatest Tamil Films of the Decade" by Film Companion; the same website ranked the actors Vignesh and Ramesh's and Aishwarya Rajesh's performance as two of the "100 Greatest Performances of the Decade". Kaaka Muttai won the National Award for Best Children's Film and Best Child Artist, for the actors Ramesh and Vignesh, at the 62nd National Film Awards.

Vignesh later went on to work with Samuthirakani in Appa (2017) and Nayanthara in the drama, Aramm (2017). Despite the success of his first film, several of Vignesh's subsequent ventures were lower in profile. In 2017, a film titled Kuzhali was announced, where he would portray the lead role alongside actress Esther Anil, though it later had a delayed released in late 2022. He also teamed up to star alongside Ramesh in films including the long-delayed Padaippalan (2022) and the unreleased Vendaikkai Katthirikkai.

== Filmography ==
| Year | Film | Role | Notes |
|---|---|---|---|
| 2015 | Kaaka Muttai | Periya Kaaka Muttai | National Film Award for Best Child Artist |
| 2016 | Appa | Vetriswaran | |
| 2017 | Aramm | Saravanan | |
| 2021 | Rudra Thandavam | Maaran | |
| 2022 | Padaippalan | | |
| 2022 | Tamil Rockerz | | Web series |
| 2022 | Kuzhali | Subramani | |
| 2023 | Pudhu Vedham | Arumugam | |
| 2025 | Phoenix | | |
| 2025 | Central | | |
