= Bol Bol Rani =

2026 Indian Marathi-language crime thriller film

- Directed by: Sid Vinsurkar
- Written by: Saurabh Bhave; Himanshu Nimbhorkar
- Produced by: Sid Vinsurkar; Apurva Motiwale; Amit Bhanushali
- Starring: Sai Tamhankar; Subodh Bhave; Chinmay Mandlekar; Sambhaji Sasane
- Cinematography: Vivian Pullan
- Edited by: Apurva Motiwale
- Music by: AV Prafullachandra
- Production company: New Zealand Motion Pictures
- Distributed by: Cinepolis India
- Release date: 17 July 2026
- Running time: 125 minutes
- Country: India
- Language: Marathi

Bol Bol Rani (transl. Speak Up, Queen) is a 2026 Indian Marathi-language mystery thriller film directed by Sid Vinsurkar in his directorial debut. Produced by Vinsurkar, Apurva Motiwale and Amit Bhanushali under the banners New Zealand Motion Pictures, the film stars Sai Tamhankar, Subodh Bhave, Chinmay Mandlekar and Sambhaji Sasane. It is adapted from Bhalchandra Sule's acclaimed Marathi play Aankhi Ek Narayan Nikam.

Structured around the Rashomon effect, the film recounts a single murder through three conflicting accounts narrated by unreliable witnesses, with each version offering a different perspective on the truth. It was released theatrically in India on 17 July 2026.

== Plot ==
The film opens with an unidentified prisoner being interrogated by the police about the death and whereabouts of another person. The prisoner refuses to answer. Meanwhile, journalist Aabhas arrives in a village to investigate the story of Maya. The villagers are reluctant to discuss her, calling her story dangerous, until an elderly man agrees to recount what happened.

According to the elderly man's version, Maya is married to the deeply possessive Malak, who confines her to their house and chains her to prevent her escape. Living in fear, Maya finds solace in books, a radio and flowers brought by Gandari, a local flower seller. She also keeps a dried rose from a former lover and regrets not having married him. When Gandari tells her that a mysterious beggar singing at a nearby temple may be her former lover, Maya suspects he has returned. He eventually visits her, and Malak realises who he is. Armed with a gun, Malak confronts them, and Maya challenges him to shoot. A gunshot is heard, but the elderly man stops his account without revealing who was killed.

Aabhas then finds Gandari, who claims the elderly man's story was false. In her version, Maya is an irresponsible woman in an arranged marriage to the affectionate Malak. She frequently leaves home, has become addicted to drugs and secretly invites her former lover over while Malak is at work. Her former lover also supplies her with drugs. When Malak discovers the addiction and confiscates the substances, Maya reacts violently. Later, after her former lover attempts to end their relationship, Maya persuades him to return. Malak eventually catches them together and confronts him. During the struggle, a gun accidentally goes off, injuring Malak. Fearing exposure, Maya ties him up and holds him captive. When her former lover returns and discovers her cruelty, the three confront one another, ending in another gunshot. Gandari again refuses to say who died.

Aabhas then asks the jeep driver who brought him to the village. The driver provides a third version, claiming that Maya and Malak genuinely love each other and have a happy marriage. Maya nevertheless remembers her former lover, believed to have died in an accident. When he unexpectedly returns, he asks her to leave Malak and begin a new life with him. He reveals that he became involved with a criminal gang rather than becoming a singer. Returning to Maya's house, he threatens her with a gun and demands that she leave with him. Malak intervenes, leading to another confrontation and gunshot.

It is eventually revealed that the prisoner from the opening is Maya. The three accounts variously portray Malak, Maya and her former lover as the villain, but each reflects the characters' suspicions and actions rather than established truth. An incident occurred in the house and one of the three died, but the film never reveals whether Malak or Maya's former lover was the victim, leaving the outcome deliberately ambiguous.

== Cast ==
- Sai Tamhankar as Maya
- Subodh Bhave as Aabhas, the journalist
- Chinmay Mandlekar as Malak, Maya's husband
- Sambhaji Sasane as lohar (Blacksmith) / Dravya / Shahir
- Padmanabh Bind as Kisna
- Dhananjay Sardeshpande as Radherao Thorat, the drunkard
- Madhuri Bharti as Gandari (Gangi), the florist

== Production ==
The screenplay, by Saurabh Bhave and Himanshu Nimbhorkar, is adapted from Bhalchandra Sule's experimental Marathi play Aankhi Ek Narayan Nikam. The film reunited Subodh Bhave, Sai Tamhankar and Chinmay Mandlekar on screen after a gap of about fifteen years.

== Soundtrack ==
Bol Bol Rani

Soundtrack album by AV Prafullachandra
- Released: July 16, 2026
- Genre: Feature film soundtrack
- Length: Zee Music Marathi

AV Prafullachandra chronology
Frame (2026)	Bol Bol Rani (2026)

The film's songs and background score were composed by AV Prafullachandra.

Track listing
No.	Title	Lyrics	Singer(s)	Length
1.	"Supernova"	Saaveri Verma	Suzanne D'Mello	2:44
2.	"Rangamahali Tuzya"	AV Prafullachandra	Deepika Bhide Bhagwat	3:13
3.	"Supernova (Reprise)"	AV Prafullachandra	AV Prafullachandra	2:40
4.	"Rangamahali Tuzya (Reprise)"	AV Prafullachandra	Deepika Bhide Bhagwat	3:05
Total length:				11:42

== Release ==
A teaser was released in June 2026. The film was initially announced for a 10 July 2026 release before being moved to 17 July 2026. It carried an "A" certificate from the Central Board of Film Certification.

== Reception ==
=== Critics response ===
Bol Bol Rani received a mixed-to-positive critical response, with most reviewers singling out Sai Tamhankar's performance for praise while noting that the film's final act was less satisfying than its opening.

Pudhari described it as "The story of Maya depicted by these three is worth watching in the cinema." Loksatta's Sameer Javale praised the performances, background music and the director's debut, writing, "There is no doubt that there are some loose ends in the film. But even putting that aside, watching the film is a pleasure." Kalpeshraj Kubal of Maharashtra Times gave 3 out of 5 stars and wrote, "Bol Bol Rani is a memorable 'experiment' of a film, despite its incomplete storyline." Divesh Chavan of Navarashtra said, "Although the film keeps the audience interested for two hours, the story does not show much emotional weight in the end." Mayur Sanap of Rediff.com praised Sai Tamhankar's "immensely watchable central performance," calling the film an unconventional whodunit more interested in the psychology of its characters than in the mystery itself. Writing for Scroll.in, Nandini Ramnath praised Tamhankar's central performance but found the film overstretched, remarking that "the ending is a copout that doesn't complete the thought with which the movie began." Anub George of The Times of India rated the film 3 out of 5, calling it "a fresh and unique cinematic offering" and praising director Sid Vinsurkar's choice to give each narrated version its own distinct visual style, though he found the investigation scenes comparatively flat.

=== Box office ===
According to trade reports, it earned around ₹13 lakh in its opening weekend and under ₹20 lakh in its first five days.
