= Kaakkaa Muttai Ramesh =

Indian child actor

- Born: Ramesh Thilaganathan
- Occupation: Child actor
- Years active: 2015–present

Kaakkaa Muttai Ramesh, also credited as Ramesh Thilaganathan and V. Ramesh, is an Indian child actor who works in Tamil-language films.

== Career ==
When casting for Kaaka Muttai (2015), director M. Manikandan picked Ramesh, hailing from the fishermen community, for a leading role in the film. He was spotted in Kasimedu playing in a slum near the beach, when he was photographed by Manikandan - who then later approached his parents. The film's storyline revolves around two slum children of Chennai, whose desire is to taste a pizza, with Ramesh and fellow newcomer Vignesh cast as brothers. The film opened to widespread critical acclaim praising the performances of the cast members, storyline, screenplay, direction and other major technical aspects. It was further considered one of the "25 Greatest Tamil Films of the Decade" by Film Companion; the same website ranked the actors Vignesh and Ramesh's and Aishwarya Rajesh's performance as two of the "100 Greatest Performances of the Decade". Kaaka Muttai won the National Award for Best Children's Film and Best Child Artist, for the actors Ramesh and Vignesh, at the 62nd National Film Awards.

Ramesh later went on to work with Vikram in his music video "Spirit of Chennai", Raghava Lawrence in Motta Shiva Ketta Shiva (2017) and Nayanthara in the drama, Aramm (2017). Despite the success of his first film, several of Ramesh's subsequent ventures were lower in profile. He also teamed up to star alongside Vignesh in films including the long-delayed Padaippalan (2022) and the unreleased Vendaikkai Katthirikkai. In 2020, he featured in Pizhai, which opened to negative reviews.

== Filmography ==
=== Films ===
Year	Film	Role	Notes
2015	Kaaka Muttai	Chinna Kaaka Muttai	National Film Award for Best Child Artist
2017	Motta Shiva Ketta Shiva	young Shiva	
2017	Aramm	Muthu	
2020	Pizhai	Vedi	
2022	Padaippalan		
2022	Tamil Rockerz		Web series
2023	Pudhu Vedham	Parattai	

Music video

- Spirit of Chennai (2016)
