= Kesari (2020 film) =

Indian Marathi Film

- Directed by: Sujay Dahake
- Screenplay by: Niyaz Mujawar
- Produced by: Santosh Ramchandani
- Starring: Virat Madake; Rupa Borgoankar; Mahesh Manjrekar; Vikram Gokhale; Mohan Joshi; Nandesh Umap; Umesh Jagtap; Chhaya Kadam; Jaywant Wadkar
- Cinematography: Sandeep Gn Yadav
- Music by: AV Prafullachandra; Score: Saket Kanetkar
- Production company: Bhavana Films
- Distributed by: AA Films
- Release date: 28 February 2020
- Country: India
- Language: Marathi

Kesari is a 2020 Indian Marathi language film directed by Sujay Sunil Dahake and produced by Santosh Ramchandani under the banner of Bhavna Films with Manohar Ramchandani as co-producer. The film starring Virat Madke, Rupa Borgaonkar, Mahesh Manjrekar, Vikram Gokhale, and Mohan Joshi follows the story of the sport of wrestling; this motivating story revolves around a young boy from a poor family who wants to win the Maharashtra Kesari title. The music of the film is composed by AV Prafullachandra & Saket Kanetkar, The film was theatrically released on 28 February 2020.

== Cast ==
- Virat Madake
- Mahesh Manjrekar
- Vikram Gokhale
- Mohan Joshi
- Nandesh Umap
- Umesh Jagtap
- Chhaya Kadam
- Jaywant Wadkar
- Nachiket Purnapatre
- Satayappa More
- Dyanratna Ahiwale
- Rupa Borgoankar
- Padmanabh Bind
- Prasad Dhendh

== Release ==
The film was theatrically released on 28 February 2020.

== Soundtrack ==
Track listing
No.	Title	Lyrics	Music	Singers	Length
1.	"Tu Chal Re Mana"	Vaibhav Joshi	AV Prafullachandra	Mohan Kannan	3:44
2.	"He Assa Pahila"	Sanjay Sathe	AV Prafullachandra	Jaydeep Vaidya, Rucha Bondre	3:27
3.	"Pailvan Aala"	Yugg	Saket Kanetkar	Yugg, Priyanka Barve	2:24
4.	"Rujala"	Kshitij Patwardhan	AV Prafullachandra	Mohan Kannan	3:34
