= Central (film) =

2025 Indian Tamil-language drama thriller film

- Directed by: Bharathi Sivalingam
- Written by: Bharathi Sivalingam
- Produced by: Viyappiyan Devaraj; Satha Kumaraguru; Tamizh Sivalingam
- Starring: J. Vignesh; Soneshwari Sivasenthilnathan; Perarasu; R. Dharshan; Aaru Bala
- Cinematography: Vinoth Gandhi
- Edited by: Vithu Jeeva
- Music by: Ela Radhakrisshnan
- Release date: July 18, 2025 (IND)
- Country: India
- Language: Tamil

Central is a 2025 Indian Tamil-language drama thriller film directed by debutant Bharathi Sivalingam. The film stars J. Vignesh, Soneshwari Sivasenthilnathan, Perarasu, R. Dharshan, and Aaru Bala. It was released on 18 July 2025.

== Plot ==
The story follows a young man who moves from his rural hometown to Chennai Central railway station due to pressing family circumstances. In the city, he confronts exploitation and the harsh realities of survival, facing dehumanizing capitalism while struggling to reclaim his dignity.

== Cast ==
- J. Vignesh
- Soneshwari Sivasenthilnathan
- Perarasu
- R. Dharshan
- Aaru Bala
- Javed Khan

== Production ==
Central marked the directorial debut of Bharathi Sivalingam. Cinematography was handled by Vinoth Gandhi, editing by Vithu Jeeva, and music composed by Ela Radhakrisshnan. It was produced by Viyappiyan Devaraj, Satha Kumaraguru, and Tamizh Sivalingam.

== Release ==
The film was released theatrically on 18 July 2025 in India with a UA certificate. And the entire Tamil Nadu theatrical release done by Phoenix Film Corporation.

== Reception ==
Central received a mixed response from critics and audiences upon its release. Critics praised the film's core idea and the performances of the lead cast, particularly highlighting the film's attempt to address its central theme with seriousness. The technical aspects, including cinematography and background score, were also noted as strengths by several reviewers.

However, some critics felt that the screenplay could have been more tightly structured and pointed out pacing issues in certain portions of the film. Despite the mixed critical reception, Central found appreciation among a section of the audience for its intent and subject matter, leading to steady word-of-mouth discussions.
