= Om Prakash (cinematographer) =

Indian cinematographer

- Born: 26 January 1978 (age 48); Coimbatore, Tamil Nadu, India
- Occupation: cinematographer
- Years active: 2002 – present

Om Prakash is an Indian cinematographer, primarily working in Tamil cinema, though he has also worked in Hindi, Telugu and Malayalam films. He worked on numerous feature films including Kalavani, Naanayam, Anegan, Maari, and Neethaane En Ponvasantham.

== Filmography ==
Year	Film	Language	Notes
2002	Nila Kannadi	Tamil	
2002	Enge Enadhu Kavithai	Tamil	
2004	Wanted	Malayalam	
2005	Chakram	Telugu	
2005	Danger	Telugu	
2008	Krishnarjuna	Telugu	
2010	Naanayam	Tamil	
2010	Kalavani	Tamil	
2011	Veppam	Tamil	
2011	Vaagai Sooda Vaa	Tamil	
2012	Neethaane En Ponvasantham; Yeto Vellipoyindhi Manasu	Tamil; Telugu	
2013	Arrambam	Tamil	
2015	Anegan	Tamil	
2015	Maari	Tamil	
2015	Yatchan	Tamil	
2016	Kaashmora	Tamil	
2017	Puthan Panam	Malayalam	
2017	Aramm	Tamil	
2018	Maari 2	Tamil	
2020	Pattas	Tamil	
2022	Thiruchitrambalam	Tamil	
2022	Naane Varuvean	Tamil	
2024	Raayan	Tamil	
2025	Vidaamuyarchi	Tamil	
2026	Maa Inti Bangaaram	Telugu	

Additional cinematography

Year	Film	Language	Notes
2014	Humpty Sharma Ki Dulhania	Hindi	1 song
