= Shrinivas Pokale =

Indian actor

- Born: 31 March 2010 (age 16); Amravati, Maharashtra, India
- Occupation: Actor
- Years active: 2018–present

Shrinivas Pokale (born 31 March 2010) is an Indian child actor who works primarily in Marathi language films. He was debuted in the 2018 with the film Naal, for which he won the Best Child Artist award at the 66th National Film Awards in 2018 and also won Best Child Artist award at Maharashtra State Film Award. He also won Best Child Artist award at 8th Filmfare Awards Marathi for the movie Naal 2, the sequel of Naal.

== Filmography ==
Key
†	Denotes films that have not yet been released

Year	Film	Role	Notes	Ref(s)
2018	Naal	Chaitanya "Chaitya" Bhosale	Film debut	
2019	George Reddy	young George Reddy	Telugu debut	
2023	Naal 2	Chaitanya "Chaitya" Bhosale		
2024	Malhar	Bhairav	Hindi and Marathi	
2024	Sangharsh Yoddha Manoj Jarange Patil	Jarange's son	Based on Manoj Jarange	
TBA	Choomantar †	TBA	Best Child Artist award at Maharashtra State Film Awards	
