= Sudhakar Reddy Yakkanti =

Indian film cinematographer

- Born: 23 March 1976 (age 50); Guntur, Andhra Pradesh, India
- Education: JNAFAU; FTII
- Occupations: Cinematographer; film director; film producer; screenwriter

Sudhakar Reddy Yakkanti is an Indian film cinematographer, turned director, screenwriter, and producer known for his works in Hindi, Telugu, and Marathi cinema. In 1999, Reddy made his foray into cinema as an assistant cinematographer under Ajayan Vincent. In 2018 he directed the Marathi feature film Naal, for which he fetched the National Film Award for Best First Film of a Director. He is known for his collaborations with Nagraj Manjule and Vikas Bahl.

== Background ==
Reddy was born on 23 March 1976 in Guntur, Andhra Pradesh into a Telugu speaking family. Reddy holds A Bachelor of Fine Arts in Photography from Jawaharlal Nehru Architecture and Fine Arts University, Hyderabad, and post graduate diploma in Cinematography from Film and Television Institute of India, Pune.

== Career ==
Reddy's script was selected by UNESCO and funded a 2003 short film Ek Aakash for which Reddy received the National Film Award – Special Jury Award – "For starting off as a simple rivalry of two kids from different backgrounds; in kite flying, becomes a battle of one-upmanship. Both are led by their ego and aggressive instincts, but eventually reach a point when they need others help" as cited by the Jury.

Ek Aakash has also garnered various international accolades such as Best Youth and Children's film at the Association for International Broadcasting, Special Mention at International Film Festival for Young and Children, Argentina, and was featured at Four Art Film Fest, Slovakia.

== Filmography ==
=== As short film director ===
- 2003: Ek Aakash (Silent film)
- 2007: II Rewind
- 2015: Road Safety Film: Jyada Akalmandi

=== As assistant director of photography ===
- 1999: Rajakumarudu
- 1999: Yamajathakudu

=== As cinematographer ===
Year	Film	Language	Notes
2005	Nammanna	Kannada	
2007	Madhumasam	Telugu	
2008	Pourudu	Telugu	
2010	Mirch	Hindi	
2011	Katha Screenplay Darsakatvam Appalaraju	Telugu	
2011	Deool	Marathi	
2013	Nautanki Saala!	Hindi	
2013	Dalam	Telugu; Tamil	
2015	Highway Ek Selfie Aarpar	Marathi	
2016	Sairat	Marathi	
2016	YZ	Marathi	
2018	Veere Di Wedding	Hindi	
2018	Naal	Marathi	Directorial debut, also writer and producer
2019	George Reddy	Telugu	Also producer
2019	Saand Ki Aankh	Hindi	
2020	Pavsacha Nibandh	Marathi	Short film
2021-present	Sunflower	Hindi	Television series on ZEE5
2022	Jhund	Hindi	
2022	Goodbye	Hindi	
2023	Ganapath	Hindi	
2023	Naal 2	Marathi	Also director, writer, and producer
2024	Shaitaan	Hindi	
2026	Matka King	Hindi	Amazon Prime Video series
