= Naal (film) =

- Theatrical release poster
- Directed by: Sudhakar Reddy Yakkanti
- Written by: Nagraj Manjule (dialogue)
- Screenplay by: Sudhakar Reddy Yakkanti
- Story by: Sudhakar Reddy Yakkanti
- Produced by: Nagraj Manjule; Sudhakar Reddy Yakkanti; Vaishali Viraj Londhe; Nikhil Varadkar; Nitin Prakash Vaidya; Prashant Madhusudhan Pethe
- Starring: Shrinivas Pokale; Nagraj Manjule; Devika Daftardar
- Cinematography: Sudhakar Reddy Yakkanti
- Edited by: Sanchari Das Mollik
- Music by: Advait Nemlekar
- Production companies: Zee Studios; Aatpat Production; Mrudganda Films
- Distributed by: Zee Studios
- Release date: 16 November 2018
- Running time: 117 minutes
- Country: India
- Language: Marathi
- Box office: est.₹31.3 crore

Naal (English: Umbilical Cord) is a 2018 Marathi film written and directed by Sudhakar Reddy Yakkanti and produced by Nagraj Manjule. Film Received Critical and Commercial success upon release it is year's highest grossing Marathi Film. At the 66th National Film Awards 2019, the film won the National Film Award for Best Debut Film of a Director trophy.

== Plot ==
Chaitanya, nicknamed Chaitya is an eight-year-old mischievous boy living in a remote village in Maharashtra. and lives with his father, who is a small-time landlord, his loving mother and his elderly grandmother. The family also owns a chicken farm, as well as a cow and her calf. The film explores his family relationships when he comes to think his mother is not his real mother.

One day, Chaitanya's uncle visits the family's home. There, while talking, the uncle accidentally slips to Chaitanya that his mother is not his biological mother, and that his real mother is a woman named Parvati. Chaitanya tells this to his older friend, Bachchan, who tells him that real mothers cry often. As a result, he keeps on asking his mother if she cries, which leads to his mother scolding him. After Bachchan runs away and causes his own mother to cry, Chaitanya decides to feign running away in order to test his mother. When his friend tells him that his mother cried, Chaitanya returns home but his mother, angry at him for running off, beats him. He then believes his 'real mother' would have never beat him and that his adopted mother does not love him. He becomes more distant from her, and stops calling her Aai (Mum).

Chaitanya's mother asks her husband to take the grandmother to their village as she interferes too much and she needs a break from her; she also wants to spend time alone with their son, feeling that he has become distant. Knowing that the trip is to where Parvati lives, Chaitanya wishes to go, but is rebuffed because he has upcoming exams. He asks Bachchan what to do to delay the trip, and Bachchan suggests making the grandmother sick by putting something in her food. This plan fails as the grandmother quickly throws away the tampered food, so Chaitanya spills marbles on the ground, hoping to make her fall. However, this plan fails as well, as she staggers but does not fall. Finally, he decides to have their calf charge at her, pretending that the calf is too strong for him to control. Grandmother falls from her chair and breaks her hip. The parents take her indoors and the trip is cancelled.

However, the calf has run off and Chaitanya's father is worried. At night, a search is made, but the calf is not found. The next day, the calf is found dead in a field, having run into some electrified wires. Chaitanya blames Bachchan for its death, but when asked does not reveal that Bachchan suggested hurting the grandmother. Instead Chaitanya claims that Bachchan had placed the electric wires to trap wild animals.

After the calf's death, the cow refuses to let anyone near her, so Father asks a man to stuff the calf to encourage the cow to keep giving milk. A few days pass and he decides to go to the city with his grandmother to get medical advice and see his brothers. Chaitanya again wishes to go with them, but his mother says he would be in his father's way and he cannot go. Chaitanya gets around this by telling his grandmother he wants to go with her, which she happily accepts. Father hires a man and his cart to take the three of them to the city. Grandmother is not able to walk without support, so she lies down in the cart. Chaitanya is impatient to get going. They cross the fields, cross a river and ride on to a bus stop where the bus is waiting.

When they reach the bus stop, Chaitanya leaps into the road and runs ahead. However, his father discovers that the grandmother has died. The cart-man advices that they return home. The bus leaves. Chaitanya is upset that they did not catch the bus, not realizing what has happened to their grandmother.

A funeral is arranged. Chaitanya is excited because his grandmother's sister will be arriving from the city with Parvati. His mother gives him a tray of tea to pass around relatives, so he carries it around, hoping to find Parvati. When he finds her, he tries to get her attention, but Parvati does not make eye contact with him, let alone talk to him, perhaps out of respect for Chaitanya's mother. When the relatives leave, he chases Parvati's cart to return an umbrella, but Parvati still does not address him directly. When he calls out to her, Parvati has tears in her eyes but does not turn back. Chaitanya is sad as she never speaks to him or acknowledges him as her son.

The stuffed calf is brought to the house and father sets it up by the cow, who now lets others to come close enough to milk her. Mother gives Chaitanya a beaker of milk. He looks at the calf and realizes that the mother who raised him is the mother that matters, whether real or adopted, and drinks the milk feeling happy at last. Mother gently wipes some milk from his lips. He looks at her and calls her 'Aai' (Mum), the first time in months. This makes her happy and they both smile at each other.

== Cast ==
- Shrinivas Pokale as Chaitanya "Chaitya" Bhosale
- Sanket Itankar as Bachchan
- Nagraj Manjule as Chaitya's father
- Devika Daftardar as Chaitya's mother
- Seva Chavan as Chaitya's grandmother
- Maithili Thakare as Devi
- Deepti Devi as Parvati
- Ganesh Deshmukh as Gajya
- Om Bhutkar as Chaitya's paternal uncle

== Production ==
=== Development ===
Sudhakar Reddy Yakkanti ace cameraman of Deool, Nautanki Saala!, Sairat, Veere Di Wedding debut as a director of this film. He also wrote story and screenplay as a "small world of a boy, his clumsy nature and ultimate an unexpected turns of event."

=== Filming ===
Naal was shot in the real locations than sets and was mainly shot in Bhandara-Gondia.

== Soundtrack ==
Naal

Soundtrack album by AV Prafullachandra Advait Nemlekar
- Released: 2018
- Genre: Feature film soundtrack
- Length: 7:00
- Language: Marathi
- Label: Zee Music Company

All music is composed by AV Prafullachandra
Advait Nemlekar.

Track listing
No.	Title	Lyrics	Singer(s)	Length
1.	"Jaav De Na Va"	AV Prafullachandra	Jayas Kumar	03:43
2.	"He Daryavata"	Vaibhav Deshmukh	Aanandi Joshi; Ankita Joshi	03:20
Total length:				07:00

== Reception ==
=== Box office ===
Naal earned ₹2.2 crores gross on the opening day. In its first week the film earned ₹14 crores. The film has collected ₹31.3 crores worldwide.

=== Critical reception ===
The Times of India review said, "Naal' is a beautiful piece of work, mostly because of its emotional story and performances." Jimmy Cage of Rotten Tomatoes described the film as, “Naal is a beautiful little film with a heartwarming, fresh story, a great cast and wonderful, rousing cinematography.” Scroll.in concluded as, “Naal has moments that cause lumps in the throat. While Chaitanya's adventures border on the comic, it's advisable to keep a box of tissues handy when the boy confronts the confounding world of grown-ups.
