= Kaaka Muttai =

2015 Indian film by M. Manikandan

- Theatrical release poster
- Directed by: M. Manikandan
- Written by: M. Manikandan
- Dialogue by: Anand Annamalai; Anand Kumaresan
- Produced by: Dhanush; Vetrimaaran
- Starring: J. Vignesh; V. Ramesh; Aishwarya Rajesh
- Cinematography: M. Manikandan
- Edited by: Kishore Te
- Music by: G. V. Prakash Kumar
- Production companies: Wunderbar Films; Grass Root Film Company
- Distributed by: Fox Star Studios
- Release dates: 5 September 2014 (Toronto International Film Festival); 5 June 2015 (Worldwide)
- Running time: 109 minutes
- Country: India
- Language: Tamil
- Box office: est. ₹12 crore

Kaaka Muttai (transl. The crow's egg) is a 2015 Indian Tamil-language comedy drama film written, directed and filmed by M. Manikandan, in his directorial debut. Jointly produced by Dhanush's Wunderbar Films, Vetrimaaran's Grass Root Film Company and distributed by Fox Star Studios, it stars newcomers J. Vignesh and V. Ramesh in the title roles, alongside Aishwarya Rajesh, Ramesh Thilak, Yogi Babu in supporting roles and Silambarasan in a cameo appearance. The film's storyline revolves around two slum children in Chennai, whose desire is to taste a pizza at local restaurant, Pizza Spot.

Vetrimaaran approached Manikandan in a film festival, after he saw one of his short films being screened. When asked by Vetrimaaran to develop a script, Manikandan wrote a storyline based on slum children and also inspired incidents from his life. Then the team cast real children living in the slum, in order to have a realistic approach. Following an official announcement in mid-January 2013, the film began production in that May 2013. It was shot in real slums and streets across Chennai within 61 working days. The film explores the themes of class-based discrimination, consumerism and media sensationalism. The film's soundtrack and score is composed by G. V. Prakash Kumar and editing was done by Kishore Te.

The film had its world premiere on 5 September 2014 as The Crow's Egg at the 39th Toronto International Film Festival, and was further screened at many other film festival circuits before its worldwide theatrical release on 5 June 2015 as Kaaka Muttai. It opened to widespread critical acclaim praising the performances of the cast members, storyline, screenplay, direction, GV Prakash's music and other major technical aspects. In addition to the critical and audience response, the film further achieved commercial success at the box-office. Kaaka Muttai was occasionally listed at the "Best Tamil Films of 2015". It was further considered one of the "25 Greatest Tamil Films of the Decade" by Film Companion; the same website ranked the actors Vignesh and Ramesh's and Aishwarya Rajesh's performance as two of the "100 Greatest Performances of the Decade". The film was remade in Marathi as Half Ticket (2016).

Kaaka Muttai won the National Award for Best Children's Film and Best Child Artist, for the actors Ramesh and Vignesh, at the 62nd National Film Awards. (Note: Despite the film's release in June 2015, the film was nominated and won two awards at the 62nd National Film Awards, as the film was shot during the 2013–14 eligibility period and was sent to film festival circuits, before the planned theatrical release.) It was the strong contender to be shortlisted for the Indian submissions for the Academy Award for Best Foreign Language Film but lost to the Marathi-language film Court (2015). At the 63rd Filmfare Awards South, the film won the Filmfare Award for Best Film, out of its four nominations in the Tamil branch. M. Manikandan received an award for Best Debut Director at the 5th South Indian International Movie Awards, where it was nominated in other four categories. The film also won six Tamil Nadu State Film Awards, six Ananda Vikatan Cinema Awards, two Norway Tamil Film Festival Awards and an Edison Awards. In July 2017, the Tamil Nadu government announced State Film Awards for films released during the 2009–2014 period in which Kaaka Muttai won three awards: Best Actress (Aishwarya), Best Child Artist (Vignesh and Ramesh) and a Special Prize for Best Film.

== Plot ==
In a tiny concrete-and-tin Chennai home in the slums live two young brothers with their mother and their grandmother. Their father is in the prison for unknown reasons and with an ageing mother-in-law, the mother does her best to keep the kitchen fires burning. The brothers spend their time playing games and stealing and devouring eggs from the crows' nests. Their love for these eggs leads them to start calling themselves Periya Kaaka Muttai and Chinna Kaaka Muttai.

Periya Kaaka Muttai and Chinna Kaaka Muttai constantly beg their mother and their grandmother for toys they cannot afford and later, for a television. The two women finally bring a television to their home, a gift from Government of Tamil Nadu to Ration Card Holders who live below Poverty Line. Periya Kaaka Muttai and Chinna Kaaka Muttai see a pizza commercial that strikes them. Meanwhile, a brand new pizza shop named Pizza Spot comes up in the neighbourhood, Actor Silambarasan inaugurates the place. Remembering the looks of enjoyment on Silambarasan's face when he tasted pizza there, Periya Kaaka Muttai and Chinna Kaaka Muttai thereafter think of nothing else but getting their first taste of those pizzas.

Periya Kaaka Muttai and Chinna Kaaka Muttai go to the railway tracks each morning to collect the charcoal that falls from goods trains. They sell the charcoal at a scrap metal shop. They usually hand the money over to their mother, who is saving up to pay their lawyer to get her husband out of prison. But once Periya Kaaka Muttai and Chinna Kaaka Muttai become aware of the cost of a pizza, they begin saving the money for themselves instead, lying to their mother that they have not collected any charcoal since they were out playing. Periya Kaaka Muttai and Chinna Kaaka Muttai succeed in saving ₹ 300 required to buy a pizza but they are sent away by the Pizza Spot's watchman since they are badly dressed their clothes, which reflects the fact that they are local slum-dwellers. The boys narrate this story to their friend Pazharasam, who works as a lineman with the railways. Pazharasam tells them that people place a lot of importance on clothes and he advises them to save up and purchase new clothes before approaching Pizza Spot again.

Periya Kaaka Muttai and Chinna Kaaka Muttai go to the work again to save money for buying new clothes at the Chennai Citi Centre. In the meantime, Periya Kaaka Muttai and Chinna Kaaka Muttai show their grandmother the pamphlet from Pizza Spot. Their grandmother tries to make them a home-cooked pizza using Dosa batter, but they fail her attempts and they insult her. After finally saving up enough money for new clothes, when Periya Kaaka Muttai and Chinna Kaaka Muttai see Chennai Citi Centre, they realise that it is another big mall which would definitely not allow them inside. But they somehow manage to acquire a newly bought pair of clothes from a couple of rich children by buying them Panipuri from a street vendor, much against the wishes of the rich boys father, who had denied them the treat as he considered it unhygienic.

Periya Kaaka Muttai and Chinna Kaaka Muttai felt happy and they return to Pizza Spot in their new clothes. Another group of slum boys who are envious and sceptical about the Periya Kaaka Muttai's and Chinna Kaaka Muttai's story about going to eat pizza them to take a video of what transpires with Periya Kaaka Muttai and Chinna Kaaka Muttai at Pizza Spot. Periya Kaaka Muttai and Chinna Kaaka Muttai are once again confronted by the pizza spot's watchman and he now forces them to go home right away, but they protest by saying that they have money and they are wearing new clothes. This argument attracts the attention of the pizza spot's Supervisor, who comes out and slaps Periya Kaaka Muttai. This is caught on video by the other slum boys, who laugh at their humiliation. Periya Kaaka Muttai and Chinna Kaaka Muttai felt sad and disappointed and they return to their slum, only to be further overwhelmed by the miserable sight of their dead grandmother. Periya Kaaka Muttai and Chinna Kaaka Muttai feel guilty and responsible when they remember that they were insulting their grandmother some time ago.

In the slum, Naina and his friend were watching the video of Periya Kaaka Muttai being slapped by the Pizza Spot's supervisor, they try to make money by threatening the Pizza Spot's owner to release the video to the media. The Pizza Spot's owner realises he could be imprisoned and Pizza Spot sealed by the Government due to the filmed act of discrimination and violence against the children. He offers Naina one hundred thousand rupees for not making the video public. He agrees, but his friend releases it to the media hoping to make some money, unaware of the huge sum being offered. This stirs up tension among the Pizza Spot's owner, who finally decide to publicly apologise Periya Kaaka Muttai and Chinna Kaaka Muttai. Periya Kaaka Muttai and Chinna Kaaka Muttai are welcomed to the pizza spot on a red carpet reminiscent of actor Silambarasan being welcomed in the inauguration ceremony. The Pizza Spot's owner also promises them free pizzas for life. Even as Periya Kaaka Muttai and Chinna Kaaka Muttai begin to finally enjoy their first pizza, they tell each other that the home-cooked Pizza which their grandmother had earlier made for them using Dosa batter had tasted much better.

== Cast ==
- J. Vignesh as Periya Kaaka Muttai
- V. Ramesh as Chinna Kaaka Muttai
- Aishwarya Rajesh as Periya Kaaka Muttai's and Chinna Kaaka Muttai's mother
- Nivas Adithan as Periya Kaaka Muttai's and Chinna Kaaka Muttai's father
- Shanthi Mani as Periya Kaaka Muttai's and Chinna Kaaka Muttai's grandmother
- Babu Antony as Shiva Chidambaram
- Joe Malloori as Pazharasam
- Ramesh Thilak as Naina
- Yogi Babu as Naina's friend
- Vazhakku En Muthuraman as a police officer
- Vettai Muthukumar as Pizza Spot's supervisor
- Krishnamoorthy as Shiva Chidambaram's assistant
- Vijay Muthu as Pavadai
- Sumathi G. as Pavadai's wife
- Silambarasan as himself in a cameo appearance

== Production ==
=== Development ===
I thought a children's movie will be a good idea to introduce myself as a director. Children's films generally have a safety net. If you do things correctly and make the kids act well, the film will turn out well. And, screenplays that are based on desires and goals will have a tighter structure because they are plot-driven. With kids the normal motivational factors like money and fame don't work as they do with adults.

— M. Manikandan, about making his debut with a children's film, Kaaka Muttai, in an interview with India Today.

M. Manikandan, a former wedding photographer, had directed a short film named Wind in late 2010, primarily for his cinematography in the film. It was critically raved by cinephiles and other celebrities, and also got the attention of director Vetrimaaran, when the film was screened at a film festival, where he was a jury member. Vetrimaaran personally approached Manikandan, to ask about his other future film projects, where Manikandan narrated a script about slum children and its essence, impressed and decided to produce the film under his Grass Root Film Company banner. He later called Manikandan to meet him and Dhanush in Delhi to progress about the narration of the script and storyline, but Dhanush said that he liked the script and also joined the film as a co-producer under the Wunderbar Films banner. Vetrimaaran said that the storyline has an artistic approach and had similarities to Slumdog Millionaire (2008).

The script's basic plot line is inspired from his life, where his son often have craved for pizza, but he could have a little money to buy it, one day. Then he inspired that "what if someone who couldn't afford a pizza wished to have one", which he kept as a basic idea pitching the story line. To develop the conflict stronger, he characterised the lead artists as slum children and also realised that the kids get attracted to things only because of catchy advertisements. Initially, he had planned to produce the film on his own, through crowdfunding, where he suggested his friends to send money for the production of the project, before Vetrimaaran agreed to produce the film. In late January 2013, both Dhanush and Vetrimaaran announced the project officially under the title Kaaka Muttai.

=== Casting and filming ===
For a children's film, Manikandan eventually planned to cast professional children from the film, but as he was not convinced with their performances, he made a visit to real slums across Mylapore to pick slum children, who do not have an acting experience. In the process, he picked J. Vignesh and Ramesh, hailing from the fishermen community, both under 15. Manikandan also trained the kids and gave a lot of rehearsals before the shoot. He eventually said that, "During shooting both of them would fight with each other often. But on screen they will look like siblings." He added that the children will play the lead protagonists and there are no typical male or female leads. Aishwarya Rajesh was roped to play the mother of the siblings. She was very hesitant at first to play a mother role at such an early stage in her career, but, after seeking advice from her Pannaiyarum Padminiyum co-star Vijay Sethupathi, she decided to be part of the film. Producer Vetrimaaran was initially sceptical to cast Aishwarya Rajesh and thought it would be more apt to cast an actual mother from the slums. Yogi Babu and Ramesh Thilak appear in supporting roles. While Manikandan handled the cinematography, Kishore Te., who was a regular in Vetrimaaran's projects, was assigned as the film editor, which became one of the last works of the editor before his death in March 2013.

The principal photography began during late-May 2013, where the entire film will be completed within a single stretch of 61 days. In order to have a realistic approach, the makers shot the film entirely in real slums and streets of Chennai. In August 2013, Silambarasan accepted to make a cameo appearance in the film. He joined the team in September 2013 to film scenes alongside Babu Antony who plays a landlord. Manikandan said that, it was difficult to capture the real attitude of kids and bring it to the screen. Further, he faced challenges such as to get a similar expression in the next shot, and to avoid night shoots with kids. But he was aware of the challenges and worked on the film. The entire shooting of the film was wrapped up within March 2014.

== Themes and influences ==
Kaaka Muttai shows the effects of globalization in a metropolitan city. It critiques politics, media and reverses the quest for a pizza into a symbol of consumerism which is shunned at the end. The ending leaves an indelible impact and finds resonance with the middle class movie-going audience irrespective of their cultural background.

— Subagunarajan VMS, editor of the magazine Kaatchi Pizhai.

Manikandan said that few scenes of the film had inspired from Not One Less, City of God and Slumdog Millionaire, based on the visual themes and setting in slums. He had pointed out a scene where the boys' mother (Aishwarya Rajesh) gives an interview to a news channel. But as a similar scene was present in Not One Less, he had to delete that scene. The Times of India-based critic M. Suganth said that Manikandan's earnestness in the filmmaking invites comparison with Iranian films like Children of Heaven (1997).

Writing for American magazine The Hollywood Reporter, Jordan Mintzer called Kaaka Muttai "an allegory for the vast class differences that persist in India, revealing how people try to profit off a system that leaves little room for advancement." Another reviewer from the Indo-Asian News Service called that "the film is filled with layers aimed at different sections of the audience, one of them being urban poverty, the other being discrimination based on class system", but praised director for using humour as a theme to keep the film mostly light hearted, though it deals with a very serious subject. Arpita Bose, writing an article for The Times of India, said that the "theme is not culture-specific but contemporary and universal. At its core, the film is about the adventures of two slum boys in a world that is taking on a swanky avatar backed by moneyed entrepreneurs, shrewd politicians and loafing opportunists." Writing for the Film Companion website, Harsh B. H. Said that the film follows "the themes of class-divide and the perils of consumerism, with just the right amount of irony, without coming off as preachy". In addition to the themes of class-based discrimination, the film was noted for media sensationalism listed by Surendhar M. K. of Firstpost, in his article about 'How media sensationalism drives diverse narratives in Tamil cinema'.

== Soundtrack ==
Kaaka Muttai

Soundtrack album by G. V. Prakash Kumar
- Released: 4 May 2015
- Recorded: 2015
- Genre: Feature film soundtrack
- Length: 18:04
- Language: Tamil
- Label: Think Music
- Producer: G. V. Prakash Kumar

G. V. Prakash Kumar chronology
Kaaval (2015)	Kaaka Muttai (2015)	Trisha Illana Nayanthara (2015)

The film's four-song soundtrack and score was composed by G. V. Prakash Kumar. Kumar earlier worked with Manikandan in the short film Wind, and was brought on board for the project, due to his regular collaborations with Vetrimaaran, the film's producer. Na. Muthukumar penned down the lyrics for the songs in the film. The film's audio was released on 4 May 2015 at Suryan FM Radio Station and Prasad Labs in Chennai. Except for the film's composer, the entire cast and crew, including the producers Dhanush and Vetrimaaran attended the launch event and released the songs. Think Music marketed the soundtrack album.

Karthik of Milliblog called the album as "GVP's best in a long time!" while Vipin Nair of Music Aloud rated the album 8 stars (out of 10), saying that the tracks are "light and likeable". This album became one of composer-actor GV Prakash's best albums

Track listing
No.	Title	Singer(s)	Length
1.	"Sel Sel"	Sathya Prakash	4:58
2.	"Maanjaave Kaanjaachu"	Gaana Bala, Srihari	4:53
3.	"Karuppu Karuppu"	G. V. Prakash Kumar	3:32
4.	"Edhai Ninaithom"	G. V. Prakash Kumar	4:41
Total length:			18:04

== Release ==
The film was selected to be screened at the 39th Toronto International Film Festival (TIFF), which was the first film by a debut Tamil director to have its world premiere at Toronto since the festival's inception in 1976. It had its world premiere under the international title The Crows Egg on 5 September 2014, and received standing ovation from the audience. In addition, the film was furthermore screened at the Rome Film Festival held during October 2014, and at the Dubai International Film Festival during late-December 2014. The film was further screened at the Brisbane Asia Pacific Film Festival, the Indian Film Festival of Los Angeles on 8 April 2015 (during the inaugural day of the ceremony), and also at the Gold Coast Film Festival.

The film's worldwide theatrical rights acquisition was brought by the corporate multi-media production house, Fox Star Studios, in order to ensure a wide reach towards the audience. Kaaka Muttai's theatrical trailer was screened during the inaugural day premiere at IFFLA in Los Angeles, during April 2015, and was positively received by audience. Since it is a children's film, the producers planned to release on the occasion of summer holidays, to attract more family audience. In mid-May 2015, the makers announced that the film will be released on 5 June 2015. In addition to the theatrical release in India, the film was also screened at overseas countries, including United Arab Emirates, Malaysia, Singapore and Sri Lanka. The film was theatrically released in Karnataka on 19 June 2015, where the Karnataka Government granted tax-free in the state, becoming the first non-Kannada film to receive tax-exemption in Karnataka. It was theatrically released on Kerala on 26 June 2015.

The presenters of the film, Dhanush and Vetrimaaran, along with the distributor Fox Star Studios, associated with charitable non-government organisation called Bhumi for the well-being of the actors. The company CEO, Vijay Singh, released a statement saying "The Chennai-based NGO will be entrusted with a substantial sum of money towards the food, education and additional needs of the two child actors. Bhumi will be entrusted with the responsibility of handling the money for the monthly expenses as well as monitoring the progress of the kids till they turn 21. At 21, the entire sum of money will be handed over to the kids for their future needs". The satellite rights of the film were sold to Star Vijay, and was premiered during the occasion of Independence Day (15 August 2015). The film was also released through the OTT-service Hotstar.

== Reception ==
=== Box office ===
In the first day of its release, Kaaka Muttai collected ₹90 lakh worldwide, with ₹40 lakh accounting from the Chennai city box-office collection from 144 shows. The film's collection steadily increased to ₹1.10 crore upon the second day and ₹1.35 crore on the third day, totalling up to ₹3.35 crore, as the three-day collection. According to trade analyst Trinath, the number was considered as a "phenomenal" figure, as the film had no star cast. The number of shows steadily increased from 192 screens, owing to the positive response from the audience, which boosted the weekday collections as the film had collected ₹85 lakh (on 8 June) and ₹92 lakh (on 9 June), respectively. The film had collected ₹7.1 crore, domestically at the first week of its release. Within ten days, the film had earned ₹8.6 crore, according to Taran Adarsh. The film's overall collection stands at ₹12 crore from three weeks. Its success at the box-office, was noted by trade analysts and film critics, that how content-oriented films triumph over commercial South Indian films. G. Dhananjayan also noted Kaaka Muttai's success as an example, that how content-oriented films fare well, as few anticipated big-budget films in Tamil fared badly at the box-office. Many news articles, listed the film as one of the "most profitable films of 2015". Kaaka Muttai was listed second at Kollywood's hit-films produced in a limited budget in 2015 according to The Times of India. The film ran for 50 days in theatres.

=== Critical response ===
Kaaka Muttai received universal critical acclaim, praising the direction, script, screenplay, performances and other technical aspects of the film. On the review aggregator website Rotten Tomatoes, 100% of 12 critics' reviews are positive, with an average rating of 7.10/10.

==== India ====
In his review for The Hindu, film critic Baradwaj Rangan called the film as an "outstanding debut" by Manikandan, going on to add, "This is one of the most assured debuts I've seen — one deserving of more than just that consolation-prize-of-a-National-Award [...] Kaaka Muttai is so entertaining that it's easy to forget how sad the undercurrents are". Writing for the same publication, Udhav Naig wrote, "Award-winning films have a troubled reputation amongst the general film audience. These films are brushed aside as ‘high-brow’ and ‘slow’. Debutant filmmaker M Manikandan's Kaaka Muttai [...] breaks from these imagined prejudices: Kaaka Muttai is a highly entertaining film, with a spotlight on poverty". Deepanjana Pal of Firstpost wrote, "Kaakka Muttai (is) one of the most charming films you'll see this year. It's beautifully shot, without making either slums or poverty look photogenic and exotic".

M. Suganth of The Times of India gave the film 4 stars out of 5 and wrote, "Manikandan's Kaaka Muttai is multi-layered; on the surface, it is all warm and inviting — a feel-good film about two kids and their simple desire and the earnestness in the filmmaking invites comparison with Iranian films like Children of Heaven...there is a hard base to it as well and from time to time, the film turns into a commentary on the class divide in our society and how it is exploited by wily politicians, an allegory of the effects of globalisation, and even a satire on media's obsession with sensationalism". S. Saraswathi of Rediff gave it 4 out of 5, too, calling it "a delightful entertainer with a subtle message". A reviewer from Sify wrote, "(It's) A charming little treat of a film [...] Held together by a sharp screenplay that throws up some pleasant surprises, this film is light, easy and enjoyable. The film works because it is intelligent and uncompromising. Kaaka Muttai is a slice of life vibrant film which is sure to put a big smile on your face as you are stepping out of the movie hall."

Anupama Subramanian of Deccan Chronicle gave it 3.5 stars and wrote, "with unenhanced visuals that gives a sense of verisimilitude, acting that isn't staged and dramatised in any obvious sense, and more importantly, characters that bring alive a subsection of the populace, Kaakka Muttai is sure to make you at least a slightly better person than you were before, owing to the reflective power of the film". Writing for Hindustan Times, Gauthaman Bhaskaran gave 3.5 out of 5 stars wrote "A neatly packaged, well structured narrative with three dimensional characters, Kaaka Muttai (Crow's Egg) is a delight to behold". Uday Bhatia of Mint wrote, "the film invites us to admire the resourcefulness of the two siblings without turning them into objects of pity or sentiment. It's the strangest feel-good film you'll see this year: two kids in rags, happily walking past piles of garbage, their heads full of pizza". Shubhra Gupta of The Indian Express gave 3.5 out of 5 saying "Like all good films that children can watch, 'Kaakkaa Muttai' has many terrific take-aways, but they are delivered minus hammering." Suhani Singh of India Today wrote "Kaakka Muttai celebrates the joys of childhood and the vivid imagination of kids, who find a way to reach their goal even if it is the most arduous one."

==== Overseas ====
Reviewing for the British news portal, The Guardian, Mike McCahill stated "M Manikandan's latter-day parable mines both laughter and tears from the struggles of two young brothers to put food on the table". Paul Byrnes, writing for The Sydney Morning Herald, said that "The vast Indian film industry produces many films like this – relatively unsophisticated in technique, but rich in observation and character detail. It's rare to see one with so much satirical edge, or such warm characterisation. The boys were recruited from a slum like the one we see. The style is not quite neo-realism, but that is the main ingredient, with large amounts of Tamil flavour." Jordan Mintzer of The Hollywood Reporter said "The Crow's Egg, is an amusing, energetic, occasionally poignant and somewhat unwieldy, that's part kids movie, part social drama, part Bollywood-style musical montage and part third world farce. And while all the parts do not necessarily form a perfect pie, the film provides some vivid moments and a handful of strong performances, which should help give it a boost". Mythili Ramachandran of Gulf News said "Without a star cast or exotic locations, here is a director who dared to present a simple story, without trapping himself in the regular mould of Tamil cinema." Writing for the South China Morning Post, James Marsh said "The light-hearted and witty script [...] incorporates everything from political corruption to media manipulation, painting a rich and vibrant portrait of the contemporary Indian experience."

=== Film charts ===
- 1st – Baradwaj Rangan, The Hindu
- 1st – Haricharan Pudipeddi, Sify
- 1st – Siddharth Srinivas, Hindustan Times
- 1st – Sreedhar Pillai, Firstpost
- 3rd – Latha Srinivasan, Daily News and Analysis
- Top 10 (listed alphabetically) – 10 Contemporary Indian Tamil Films by Vogue India
- Top 25 (listed alphabetically) – Baradwaj Rangan, Film Companion South (25 Greatest Tamil Films of the Decade)
- Top 15 (listed alphabetically) The Hindu Cinema Team (Favourite Tamil Films of the Decade)

=== Accolades ===
Award	Date of ceremony (Note: Date is linked to the article about the awards held that year, wherever possible.)	Category	Recipient(s) and nominee(s)	Result	Ref.
Ananda Vikatan Cinema Awards	7 January 2016	Best Film	Dhanush Vetrimaaran	Won	
Ananda Vikatan Cinema Awards	7 January 2016	Best Director	M. Manikandan	Won	
Ananda Vikatan Cinema Awards	7 January 2016	Best Dialogue	Anand Annamalai, Anand Kumaresan	Won	
Ananda Vikatan Cinema Awards	7 January 2016	Best Editor	Kishore Te (Posthumously awarded)	Won	
Ananda Vikatan Cinema Awards	7 January 2016	Best Story	M. Manikandan	Won	
Ananda Vikatan Cinema Awards	7 January 2016	Best Child Artist	J. Vignesh; V. Ramesh	Won	
Edison Awards	14 February 2016	Best Producer	Dhanush Vetrimaaran	Won	
Edison Awards	14 February 2016	Best Actress	Aishwarya Rajesh	Nominated	
Edison Awards	14 February 2016	Best Character Actress	Shanthi Mani	Nominated	
Edison Awards	14 February 2016	Best Juvenile Artist	J. Vignesh; V. Ramesh	Nominated	
Edison Awards	14 February 2016	Best Cinematographer	M. Manikandan	Nominated	
Edison Awards	14 February 2016	Best Screenplay	M. Manikandan	Nominated	
Edison Awards	14 February 2016	Best Story	M. Manikandan	Nominated	
Edison Awards	14 February 2016	Best Background Score	G. V. Prakash Kumar	Nominated	
Edison Awards	14 February 2016	Best Debut Director	M. Manikandan	Nominated	
Filmfare Awards South	18 June 2016	Best Film – Tamil	Dhanush Vetrimaaran	Won	
Filmfare Awards South	18 June 2016	Best Director – Tamil	M. Manikandan	Nominated	
Filmfare Awards South	18 June 2016	Best Actress – Tamil	Aishwarya Rajesh	Nominated	
IIFA Utsavam	24–25 January 2016	Best Performance In A Leading Role — Male	J. Vignesh	Nominated	
IIFA Utsavam	24–25 January 2016	Best Performance In A Supporting Role — Female	Aishwarya Rajesh	Nominated	
IIFA Utsavam	24–25 January 2016	Best Performance In A Comic Role	Ramesh Thilak	Nominated	
IIFA Utsavam	24–25 January 2016	Best Music Director	G. V. Prakash Kumar	Nominated	
Indian Film Festival of Los Angeles	8 April 2015	Audience's Choice Award for Best Feature Film	Dhanush Vetrimaaran	Won	
Indian Film Festival of Los Angeles	8 April 2015	Best Actor Jury Award	J. Vignesh; V. Ramesh	Won	
National Film Awards	3 May 2015	Best Children's Film	Dhanush Vetrimaaran	Won	
National Film Awards	3 May 2015	Best Child Artist	J. Vignesh; V. Ramesh	Won	
Norway Tamil Film Festival Awards	28 April–1 May 2016	Best Film	Dhanush Vetrimaaran	Won	
Norway Tamil Film Festival Awards	28 April–1 May 2016	Best Actress	Aishwarya Rajesh	Won	
Norway Tamil Film Festival Awards	28 April–1 May 2016	Best Supporting Actor	Ramesh Thilak (also for Orange Mittai)	Won	
Norway Tamil Film Festival Awards	28 April–1 May 2016	Best Editor	Kishore Te (Posthumously awarded)	Won	
South Indian International Movie Awards	30 June–1 July 2016	Best Film — Tamil	Dhanush Vetrimaaran	Nominated	
South Indian International Movie Awards	30 June–1 July 2016	Best Actress – Tamil	Aishwarya Rajesh	Nominated	
South Indian International Movie Awards	30 June–1 July 2016	Best Comedian – Tamil	Yogi Babu	Nominated	
South Indian International Movie Awards	30 June–1 July 2016	Best Debutant Director — Tamil	M. Manikandan	Won	
Taipei Golden Horse Film Festival	25 November 2015	NETPAC Award	Dhanush Vetrimaaran	Won	
Tamil Nadu State Film Awards	13 July 2017	Special Prize (Best Film)	Dhanush Vetrimaaran	Won	
Tamil Nadu State Film Awards	13 July 2017	Best Actress	Aishwarya Rajesh	Won	
Tamil Nadu State Film Awards	13 July 2017	Best Child Artist	J. Vignesh; V. Ramesh	Won	

== Remake ==
Filmmaker Samit Kakkad watched the film at a festival in Mumbai and expressed his interest in adapting the film into Marathi language. Later he worked on that film, which was titled Half Ticket and altered the script in a minor way to include certain nuances of the Marathi language, by changed the setting to Mumbai instead of Chennai. G. V. Prakash Kumar retained the tracks of the original counterpart for this film, also making his Marathi debut. The film produced by Video Palace, alongside Fox Star Studios, which distributed the original film, released on 22 July 2016.
