= Discontinued and intermittent National Film Awards =

Film awards granted by the Indian government

The National Film Awards are presented every year by the National Film Development Corporation of India. Following is the list of discontinued and intermittent National Film Awards. Throughout the year various awards have been discontinued and given intermittently. The awards, instituted 1953, on the 40th anniversary of Indian Cinema, are given for feature films, non-feature films and best writing on cinema, and were once officially known as the State Awards for Films. In addition to the regular National Film Awards, several discontinued and Intermittent National Film Awards have been presented throughout the years.

== Discontinued Feature film award categories ==
Following are the discontinued National Film Awards from feature films category:

=== All India Certificate of Merit ===
It was instituted in 1954 and awarded at 1st National Film Awards and was lastly awarded in 1957 at 4th National Film Awards. It was given along with National Film Award for Best Feature Film and two films per year were awarded with this award.

List of films, showing the year (award ceremony), language(s), producer(s) and director(s)
Year	Film(s)	Language(s)	Producer(s)	Director(s)	Refs.
1953 (1st)	Do Bigha Zamin	Hindi	Bimal Roy	Bimal Roy	
1953 (1st)	Bhagavan Sri Krishna Chaitanya	Bengali	Debaki Bose	Debaki Bose	
1954 (2nd)	Neelakuyil	Malayalam	Chandrathara Productions	• P. Bhaskaran • Ramu Kariat	
1954 (2nd)	Biraj Bahu	Hindi	Hiten Chaudhary Productions	Bimal Roy	
1955 (3rd)	Jhanak Jhanak Payal Baaje	Hindi	Rajkamal Kalamandir	V. Shantaram	
1955 (3rd)	Shirdi Che Sai Baba	Marathi	Nandadeep Chitra	Kumarsen Samarth	
1956 (4th)	Bandhan	Hindi	Sircar Productions	Hem Chunder	
1956 (4th)	Tenali Ramakrishna	Telugu	Vikram Productions	B. S. Ranga	
1957 (5th)	Mother India	Hindi	Mehboob Productions	Mehboob Khan	

=== Third Best Feature Film ===
It was instituted in 1958 and awarded at 6th National Film Awards and lastly awarded in 1965 at 13th National Film Awards and discontinued after that.

List of films, showing the year (award ceremony), language(s), producer(s) and director(s)
Year	Film(s)	Language(s)	Producer(s)	Director(s)	Refs.
1958 (6th)	School Master	Kannada	B. R. Panthulu	B. R. Panthulu	
1959 (7th)	Sujata	Hindi	Bimal Roy	Bimal Roy	
1960 (8th)	Deivapiravi	Tamil	Kamal Brothers Pvt Ltd	• R. Krishnan • S. Panju	
1961 (9th)	Prapanch	Marathi	Indian National Pictures	Madhukar Pathak	
1962 (10th)	Sautela Bhai	Hindi	Alok Bharati	Mahesh Kaul	
1963 (11th)	Mahanagar	Bengali	R. D. Bansal	Satyajit Ray	
1964 (12th)	Unnaipol Oruvan	Tamil	Aasiya Jyothi films	D. Jayakanthan	
1965 (13th)	Chhoti Chhoti Baten	Hindi	Rajvanshi Productions	Motilal Rajvansh	

=== Best Story ===
It was instituted in 1962 and awarded at 10th National Film Awards and lastly awarded in 1975 at 23rd National Film Awards and discontinued after that. In the first year, for the 10th National Film Awards, award winners were awarded only with Certificate of Merit. Later on, all the award winners were awarded with Silver Lotus and cash prize of ₹10,000.

List of award recipients, showing the year (award ceremony), film(s) and language(s)
Year	Recipient(s)	Film(s)	Language(s)	Refs.
1962 (10th)	Not Available	Four Centuries Ago	English	
1964 (12th)	Balai Chand Mukhopadhyay	Aarohi	Bengali	
1965 (13th)	Motilal	Chhoti Chhoti Baten	Hindi	
1965 (13th)	B. K. Dutt	Shaheed	Hindi	
1965 (13th)	Din Dayal Sharma	Shaheed	Hindi	
1973 (21st)	Ismat Chughtai	Garm Hava	Hindi	
1973 (21st)	Kaifi Azmi	Garm Hava	Hindi	
1974 (22nd)	Ritwik Ghatak	Jukti Takko Aar Gappo	Bengali	
1975 (23rd)	K. Shivaram Karanth	Chomana Dudi	Kannada	

=== Best Film Based on High Literary Work ===
It was instituted in 1966 and awarded only at 14th National Film Awards.

List of films, showing the year (award ceremony), language(s), producer(s) and director(s)
Year	Film(s)	Language(s)	Producer(s)	Director(s)	Refs.
1966 (14th)	Chutti	Bengali	Arundhati Devi	Arundhati Devi	

== Discontinued Non-feature film award categories ==
Following are the discontinued National Film Awards from non-feature films category:

=== Best Experimental Film ===
It was instituted in 1966 and awarded at 14th National Film Awards and lastly awarded in 1983 at 31st National Film Awards and discontinued after that.

List of films, showing the year (award ceremony), language(s), producer(s) and director(s)
Year	Film(s)	Language(s)	Producer(s)	Director(s)	Refs.
1966 (14th)	Homosaps	English	–	–	
1967 (15th)	Through the Eyes of a Painter	English	J. S. Bhownagary for Films Division	M. F. Husain (as a Creator)	
1968 (16th)	And I Make Short Films	English	K. L. Khandpur for Films Division	S. N. S. Sastry	
1969 (17th)	No Award				
1970 (18th)	No Award				
1971 (19th)	No Award				
1972 (20th)	No Award				
1973 (21st)	Homi Bhabha — A Scientist in Action	English	Jagat Murari	Viswanathan K	
1974 (22nd)	No Award				
1975 (23rd)	Awashesh	Hindi	FTII	K. G. Girish	
1976 (24th)	Murder at Monkey Hill	Hindi	FTII	Vidhu Vinod Chopra	
1977 (25th)	Samadhi	Music only	FTII	John Sankaramangalam	
1978 (26th)	No Award				
1979 (27th)	Child On a Chess Board	Music only	Films Division	Vijay B Chandra	
1980 (28th)	Arrival	English	Films Division	Mani Kaul	
1981 (29th)	No Award				
1982 (30th)	Chakkar Chandu Ka Chameliwala	Hindi	FTII	N. C. Thade	
1983 (31st)	The Clown and The Dog	English	FTII	Sunny Joseph	

=== Best Filmstrip ===
It was instituted in 1963 and awarded only at 11th National Film Awards.

List of films, showing the year (award ceremony), language(s), producer(s) and director(s)
Year	Film(s)	Language(s)	Producer(s)	Director(s)	Refs.
1963 (11th)	Historical Monuments of Delhi	Hindi	G. K. Athalye	G. K. Athalye	

=== Best Industrial Film ===
It was instituted in 1984 and awarded at 32nd National Film Awards and lastly awarded in 1988 at 36th National Film Awards and discontinued after that.

List of films, showing the year (award ceremony), language(s), producer(s) and director(s)
Year	Film(s)	Language(s)	Producer(s)	Director(s)	Refs.
1984 (32nd)	Krishi Jantrapati	Hindi	Ghanashyam Mahapatra	Ghanashyam Mahapatra	
1985 (33rd)	Safety Measures in Handling Agriculture Machinery	English	D. Gautaman	Gurbir Singh Grewal	
1986 (34th)	The Story of Glass	English	S. Kumar	Buddhadeb Dasgupta	
1987 (35th)	Golden Muga Silk - The Cultural Heritage of Assam	English	Director (NE), Central Silk Board, Assam	Siba Prasad Thakur	
1987 (35th)	Looking Back	English	Drishtikon Productions for Films Division	Prakash Jha	
1988 (36th)	The Duo	English	Sanat Kumar Dasgupta	Sanat Kumar Dasgupta	

=== Best News Review ===
It was instituted in 1975 and awarded at 23rd National Film Awards and lastly awarded in 1988 at 36th National Film Awards and discontinued after that.

List of films, showing the year, language(s), producer(s) and director(s)
Year	Film(s)	Language(s)	Producer(s)	Director(s)	Refs.
1975 (23rd)	Indian News Review No. 1399	–	N. V. K. Murthy	–	
1976 (24th)	Indian News Review No. 1559	–	–	–	
1977 (25th)	Unprecedented Havoc (Indian News Review No. 1520)	English	Films Division	–	
1978 (26th)	Uttar Pradesh Samachar 24	Hindi	Director of Information and Public Relations, U.P.	–	
1979 (27th)	Indian News Review No. 1592	English	–	–	
1980 (28th)	Day of the Dark Sun (News Magazine 3)	–	Films Division	–	
1981 (29th)	News Magazine 12	–	Vijay B. Chandra for Films Division	–	
1982 (30th)	Asiad 82 - News 1	–	N. S. Thapa for Films Division	–	
1983 (31st)	Shelter	English	FTII	–	
1984 (32nd)	The Rickshaw Drivers of Madhya Pradesh	English	Madhya Pradesh Media	Naren Kondra	
1985 (33rd)	Taranath Shenoy (News Magazine 59)	English	• P. B. Pendharkar • Pritam S. Arshi	• M. S. Gangadhar • Ashok Patil	
1986 (34th)	The Pope Meets India (News Magazine 70)	English	• P. B. Pendharkar • P. S. Arshi for Films Division	Camera Team for Films Division	
1987 (35th)	Colours of Life (News Magazine 100)	English	Pritam S. Arshi for Films Division	• Mahesh P. Sinha • Sant Lal Prasad (Cameraman)	
1988 (36th)	More Than a Success Story (News Magazine 129)	English	Biren Das for Films Division	K. B. Nair	

=== Best Newsreel Cameraman ===
It was instituted in 1975 and awarded at 23rd National Film Awards and lastly awarded in 1983 at 31st National Film Awards and discontinued after that.

List of films, showing the year (award ceremony), language(s) and producer(s)
Year	Film(s)	Language(s)	Producer(s)	Refs.
1975 (23rd)	Flood Havocs (Indian News Review No. 1399)	English	• A. S. Agnihotri • Abinashi Ram • A. R. Saroef	
1976 (24th)	Indian News Review No. 1462	English	–	
1977 (25th)	Indian News Review No. 1508	English	C. L. Kaul	
1978 (26th)	Dawn Over Gurais (Indian News Review No. 1568)	English	C. L. Kaul	
1979 (27th)	Mission To China (INR NO - 1585)	–	–	
1980 (28th)	Tragedy of Gendi (Indian News Review No. 1657)	English	• Mahesh Pratap Sinha • Rajgopal Rao	
1981 (29th)	No Award			
1982 (30th)	No Award			
1983 (31st)	Tragedy of Gendi (Indian News Review No. 1799)	English	• C. Ramani • Uday Shankar • S. L. Prasad	

== Intermittent Feature film award categories ==
=== Best Feature Film in the languages of Schedule VIII ===
==== Best Bodo Feature Film ====
This has only been awarded twice so far, at 33rd National Film Awards in 1985, and more recently at the 63rd National Film Awards in 2015. The Bodo language, spoken mainly in Northeast India by about 1.4 million people, is a Scheduled language of the Indian Constitution since 2003.

List of films, showing the year (award ceremony), producer(s) and director(s)
Year	Film(s)	Producer(s)	Director(s)	Refs.
1985 (33rd)	Alayaron	Bodosa Film Productions	Jwngdao Bodosa	
2015 (63rd)	Dau Huduni Methai	Shankarlal Goenka	Manju Borah	

==== Best Dogri Feature Film ====
The National Film Award for Best Dogri Feature Film is for Dogri cinema. Till now, it is only awarded at 59th National Film Awards in 2011. Per Constitution of India, Dogri language is among the languages specified in the Schedule VIII of the Constitution.

List of films, showing the year (award ceremony), producer(s) and director(s)
Year	Film(s)	Producer(s)	Director(s)	Refs.
2011 (59th)	Dille Ch Vasya Koi	Sanjeev Rattan	Sanjeev Rattan	

==== Best Kashmiri Feature Film ====
It is only awarded at 12th National Film Awards in 1964. Per Constitution of India, Kashmiri language is among the languages specified in the Schedule VIII of the Constitution.

List of films, showing the year (award ceremony), producer(s) and director(s)
Year	Film(s)	Producer(s)	Director(s)	Refs.
1964 (12th)	Mainz-Raat	M. R. Seth	• Shyam • Jagiram Paul	

==== Best Maithili Feature Film ====
The National Film Award for Best Maithili Feature Film is for Maithili cinema. Till now, it is only awarded at 63rd National Film Awards in 2015. Per Constitution of India, Maithili is among the languages specified in the Schedule VIII of the Constitution.

List of films, showing the year (award ceremony), producer(s) and director(s)
Year	Film(s)	Producer(s)	Director(s)	Refs.
2015 (63rd)	Mithila Makhaan	• Neetu Chandra • Samir Kumar	Nitin Chandra	
2021 (69th)	Samanantar	• Niraj Kumar Mishra • Atul Pandey	Niraj Kumar Mishra	

==== Best Sanskrit Feature Film ====
The National Film Award for Best Sanskrit Feature Film is for Sanskrit cinema. Till now, it has only been awarded once, at the 63rd National Film Awards in 2015. Per Constitution of India, Sanskrit language is among the languages specified in the Schedule VIII of the Constitution.

List of films, showing the year (award ceremony), producer(s) and director(s)
Year	Film(s)	Producer(s)	Director(s)	Refs.
2015 (63rd)	Priyamanasam	Baby Mathew Somatheeram	Vinod Mankara	

==== Best Urdu Feature Film ====
This has been awarded four times, at the 41st National Film Awards in 1993, at 44th National Film Awards in 1996, at the 60th National Film Awards in 2012 and at the 66th National Film Awards in 2018. Per Constitution of India, Urdu is among the languages specified in the Schedule VIII of the Constitution.

List of films, showing the year (award ceremony), producer(s) and director(s)
Year	Film(s)	Producer(s)	Director(s)	Refs.
1993 (41st)	Muhafiz	Wahid Chowhan	Ismail Merchant	
1996 (44th)	Sardari Begum	• Amit Khanna • Mahesh Bhatt	Shyam Benegal	
2012 (60th)	Harud	• Aamir Bashir • Shankar Raman	Aamir Bashir	
2018 (66th)	Hamid	Saregama India Limited	Aijaz Khan	

=== Best Feature Film in the languages not of Schedule VIII ===
==== Best Bhojpuri Feature Film ====
It is only awarded at 53rd National Film Awards in 2005. Per Constitution of India, Bhojpuri language is among the languages other than those specified in the Schedule VIII of the Constitution.

List of films, showing the year (award ceremony), producer(s) and director(s)
Year	Film(s)	Producer(s)	Director(s)	Refs.
2005 (53rd)	Kab Hoi Gawna Hamar	Deepa Narayan	Anand D. Ghatraj	

==== Best Chhattisgarhi Feature Film ====
List of films, showing the year (award ceremony), producer(s) and director(s)
Year	Film(s)	Producer(s)	Director(s)	Refs.
2019 (67th)	Bhulan the Maze	Swapnil Film Productions	Manoj Verma	

==== Best Dimasa Feature Film ====
List of films, showing the year (award ceremony), producer(s) and director(s)
Year	Film(s)	Producer(s)	Director(s)	Refs.
2020 (68th)	Semkhor	Aimee Baruah Production Society	Aimee Baruah	

==== Best Garo Feature Film ====
It was awarded twice. Per Constitution of India, Garo language is among the languages other than those specified in the Schedule VIII of the Constitution.

List of films, showing the year (award ceremony), producer(s) and director(s)
Year	Film(s)	Producer(s)	Director(s)	Refs.
2018 (66th)	Ma.ama	Anna Films	Dominic Sangma	
2023 (71st)	Rimdogittanga	Anna Films; Uncombined Buddha; Joicy Studio	Dominic Sangma	

==== Best Haryanvi Feature Film ====
It is only awarded thrice at 62nd (2014) and 63rd National Film Awards (2015) and 67th National Film Awards (2019). Per Constitution of India, Haryanvi language is among the languages other than those specified in the Schedule VIII of the Constitution.

List of films, showing the year (award ceremony), producer(s) and director(s)
Year	Film(s)	Producer(s)	Director(s)	Refs.
2014 (62nd)	Pagdi The Honour	V R Entertainers	Rajeev Bhatia	
2015 (63rd)	Satrangi	Punam Deswal Sharma	Sundeep Sharma	
2019 (67th)	Chhoriyan Chhoron Se Kam Nahi Hoti	• Essel Vision Productions Limited • Satish Kaushik Entertainment	Rajesh Amar Lal Babbar	
2020 (68th)	Dada Lakhmi	Anhad Studio Pvt.Ltd	Yashpal Sharma	

==== Best Jasari Feature Film ====
It is only awarded at 65th National Film Awards in 2017. Per Constitution of India, Jasari language is among the languages other than those specified in the Schedule VIII of the Constitution.

List of films, showing the year (award ceremony), producer(s) and director(s)
Year	Film(s)	Producer(s)	Director(s)	Refs.
2017 (65th)	Sinjar	Shibu G. Suseelan	Pampally	

==== Best Khasi Feature Film ====
It is only awarded four times at 32nd National Film Awards in 1984, at 61st National Film Awards in 2013, 63rd National Film Awards in 2015 and lately at 67th National Film Awards in 2019. Per Constitution of India, Khasi language is among the languages other than those specified in the Schedule VIII of the Constitution.

List of films, showing the year (award ceremony), producer(s) and director(s)
Year	Film(s)	Producer(s)	Director(s)	Refs.
1984 (32nd)	Manik Raitong	Rishan Rapsang	Ardhendu Bhattacharya	
2013 (61st)	Ri: Homeland of Uncertainty	Kurbah Films	Pradip Kurbah	
2015 (63rd)	Onaatah	• Pomu Das • Marjina Kurbah	Pradip Kurbah	
2019 (67th)	Iewduh	Shiven Arts	Pradip Kurbah	

==== Best Kodava Feature Film ====
It is only awarded at 41st National Film Awards in 1993. Per Constitution of India, Kodava language is among the languages other than those specified in the Schedule VIII of the Constitution.

List of films, showing the year (award ceremony), producer(s) and director(s)
Year	Film(s)	Producer(s)	Director(s)	Refs.
1993 (41st)	Mandhara Phu	B. N. Ravi	S. R. Rajan	

==== Best Kokborok Feature Film ====
It is only awarded at 56th National Film Awards in 2008. Per Constitution of India, Kokborok language is among the languages other than those specified in the Schedule VIII of the Constitution.

List of films, showing the year (award ceremony), producer(s) and director(s)
Year	Film(s)	Producer(s)	Director(s)	Refs.
2008 (56th)	Yarwng	Joseph Kizhakechennadu	Joseph Pulinthanath	

==== Best Ladakhi Feature Film ====
It is only awarded at 65th National Film Awards in 2017. Per Constitution of India, Ladakhi language is among the languages other than those specified in the Schedule VIII of the Constitution.

List of films, showing the year (award ceremony), producer(s) and director(s)
Year	Film(s)	Producer(s)	Director(s)	Refs.
2017 (65th)	Walking With The Wind	Mahesh Mohan	Praveen Morchhale	

==== Best Mising Feature Film ====
It is awarded thrice in 2012, 2019 and 2021 ceremonies. Per Constitution of India, Mising language is among the languages other than those specified in the Schedule VIII of the Constitution.

List of films, showing the year (award ceremony), producer(s) and director(s)
Year	Film(s)	Producer(s)	Director(s)	Refs.
2012 (60th)	Ko Yad	Manju Borah	Manju Borah	
2019 (67th)	Anu Ruwad	Obonori Pictures	Dilip Kumar Doley	
2021 (69th)	Boomba Ride	Quarter Moon Productions	Biswajeet Bora	

==== Best Mizo Feature Film ====
It is only awarded at 63rd National Film Awards in 2015. Per Constitution of India, Mizo language is among the languages other than those specified in the Schedule VIII of the Constitution.

List of films, showing the year (award ceremony), producer(s) and director(s)
Year	Film(s)	Producer(s)	Director(s)	Refs.
2015 (63rd)	Kima’s Lode Beyond the Class	Children's Film Society	Zualaa Chhangte	

==== Best Monpa Feature Film ====
It is only awarded at 53rd National Film Awards in 2005. Per Constitution of India, Monpa language is among the languages other than those specified in the Schedule VIII of the Constitution.

List of films, showing the year (award ceremony), producer(s) and director(s)
Year	Film(s)	Producer(s)	Director(s)	Refs.
2005 (53rd)	Sonam	Garima Films	Ahsan Muzid	

==== Best Moran Feature Film ====
List of films, showing the year (award ceremony), producer(s) and director(s)
Year	Film(s)	Producer(s)	Director(s)	Refs.
2016 (64th)	Haanduk	Mayamara Production	Jaicheng Jai Dohutia	

==== Best Pangchenpa Feature Film ====
It is only awarded at 66th National Film Awards in 2018. Per Constitution of India, Pangchenpa language is among the languages other than those specified in the Schedule VIII of the Constitution.

List of films, showing the year (award ceremony), producer(s) and director(s)
Year	Film(s)	Producer(s)	Director(s)	Refs.
2018 (66th)	In the Land of Poison Women	Aaas Productions	Manju Borah	

==== Best Paniya Feature Film ====
It is only awarded at 66th National Film Awards in 2018. Per Constitution of India, Pangchenpa language is among the languages other than those specified in the Schedule VIII of the Constitution.

List of films, showing the year (award ceremony), producer(s) and director(s)
Year	Film(s)	Producer(s)	Director(s)	Refs.
2019 (67th)	Kenjira	Aaas Productions	Neru Films	

==== Best Rabha Feature Film ====
It is only awarded at 62nd National Film Awards in 2014. Per Constitution of India, Rabha language is among the languages other than those specified in the Schedule VIII of the Constitution.

List of films, showing the year (award ceremony), producer(s) and director(s)
Year	Film(s)	Producer(s)	Director(s)	Refs.
2014 (62nd)	Orong	• Suraj Kr. Duwarah • Aucto Creation	Suraj Kr. Duwarah	

==== Best Rajasthani Feature Film ====
List of films, showing the year (award ceremony), producer(s) and director(s)
Year	Film(s)	Producer(s)	Director(s)	Refs.
2018 (66th)	Turtle	Shivazza Films & Entertainment	Dinesh S Yadav	

==== Best Sherdukpen Feature Film ====
It is awarded twice at 61st National Film Awards in 2013 and 66th National Film Awards in 2018. Per Constitution of India, Sherdukpen language is among the languages other than those specified in the Schedule VIII of the Constitution.

List of films, showing the year (award ceremony), producer(s) and director(s)
Year	Film(s)	Producer(s)	Director(s)	Refs.
2013 (61st)	Crossing Bridges	TNT Films Production	Sange Dorjee Thongdok	
2018 (66th)	Mishing	BB Entertainment Trade Private Limited	Bobby Sarma Baruah	

==== Best Tai Phake Feature Film ====
The National Film Award for Best Tiwa Feature Film is for the films made in Tai Phake language. Till now, it is awarded once at the 71st National Film Awards.

List of films, showing the year (award ceremony), producer(s) and director(s)
Year	Film(s)	Producer(s)	Director(s)	Refs.
2023 (71st)	Pai Tang	Naba Kumar Bhuyan	Prabal Khaund	

==== Best Tiwa Feature Film ====
The National Film Award for Best Tiwa Feature Film is for the films made in Tiwa language. Till now, it is awarded once at the 70th National Film Awards.

List of films, showing the year (award ceremony), producer(s) and director(s)
Year	Film(s)	Producer(s)	Director(s)	Refs.
2022 (70th)	Sikaisal	Imaging Media	Bobby Sarma Baruah	

==== Best Tulu Feature Film ====
It is awarded seven times. Per Constitution of India, Tulu language is among the languages other than those specified in the Schedule VIII of the Constitution.

List of films, showing the year (award ceremony), producer(s) and director(s)
Year	Film(s)	Producer(s)	Director(s)	Refs.
1993 (41st)	Bangar Patler	Richard Castellano	Richard Castellano	
2006 (54th)	Kotti Channaya	R. Dhanaraj	Anand P. Raj	
2008 (56th)	Gaggara	M. Durganand	Shivadhwaj Shetty	
2016 (64th)	Madipu	Aastha Production	Chethan Mundadi	
2017 (65th)	Paddayi	Nithyananda Pai	Abhaya Simha	
2019 (67th)	Pingara	DMR Productions	R. Preetham Shetty	
2020 (68th)	Jeetige	AR Productions	Santhosh Mada	
2026 (72nd)	Imbu	Prashanth Rai	Shivadhwaj Shetty	

==== Best Wancho Feature Film ====
It is only awarded at 63rd National Film Awards in 2015. Per the Constitution of India, Wancho language is among the languages other than those specified in the Schedule VIII of the Constitution.

List of films, showing the year (award ceremony), producer(s) and director(s)
Year	Film(s)	Producer(s)	Director(s)	Refs.
2015 (63rd)	The Head Hunter	Splash Films Private Limited	Nilanjan Datta	

== Intermittent Writing on cinema award categories ==
=== Special Mention (Film Critic) ===
List of recipients, showing the year (award ceremony) and language(s)
Year	Recipient(s)	Language(s)	Refs.
2000 (48th)	Ratnottama Sengupta	English	
2001 (49th)	C. S. Venkiteswaran	Malayalam	
2002 (50th)	Ashok Rane	Marathi	
2006 (54th)	Utpal Datta	Assamese	
2012 (60th)	Piyush Roy	English	
2017 (65th)	Sunil Mishra	Hindi	
2021 (69th)	B. N. Subramanya	Kannada	
