= 12th National Film Awards =

Indian ceremony celebrating cinema of 1964

- Awarded for: Best of Indian cinema in 1964
- Awarded by: Ministry of Information and Broadcasting
- Presented by: P. V. Cherian (Governor of Maharashtra)
- Presented on: 31 May 1965
- Site: Mumbai
- Official website: dff.nic.in

Highlights
- Best Feature Film: Charulata
- Most awards: Aarohi (2)

The 12th National Film Awards, then known as State Awards for Films, presented by Ministry of Information and Broadcasting, India to felicitate the best of Indian Cinema released in 1964. Ceremony took place at Vigyan Bhavan, New Delhi on 31 May 1965 and awards were given by then Governor of Maharashtra, P. V. Cherian.

Starting with 12th National Film Awards, a new award was introduced at All India level for Best Story Writer. Also awards for films made in English and Kashmiri language are also considered for the President's Silver Medal for Best Feature Film in the respective language at the regional level.

== Awards ==
Awards were divided into feature films and non-feature films.

President's Gold Medal for the All India Best Feature Film is now better known as National Film Award for Best Feature Film, whereas President's Gold Medal for the Best Documentary Film is analogous to today's National Film Award for Best Non-Feature Film. For children's films, Prime Minister's Gold Medal is now given as National Film Award for Best Children's Film. At the regional level, President's Silver Medal for Best Feature Film is now given as National Film Award for Best Feature Film in a particular language. Certificate of Merit in all the categories is discontinued over the years.

=== Feature films ===
Feature films were awarded at All India as well as regional level. For 12th National Film Awards, a Bengali film Charulata won the President's Gold Medal for the All India Best Feature Film. Following were the awards given:

==== All India Award ====
For 12th National Film Awards, none of the films were awarded from Children's Films category as no film was found to be suitable. Following were the awards given in each category:

Award	Film	Language	Awardee(s)	Cash prize
President's Gold Medal for the All India Best Feature Film	Charulata	Bengali	Producer: R. D. Bansal	Gold Medal and ₹ 20,000
President's Gold Medal for the All India Best Feature Film	Charulata	Bengali	Director: Satyajit Ray	₹ 5,000
All India Certificate of Merit for the Second Best Feature Film	Haqeeqat	Hindi	Producer: Chetan Anand	Certificate of Merit and ₹ 10,000
All India Certificate of Merit for the Second Best Feature Film	Haqeeqat	Hindi	Director: Chetan Anand	₹ 2,500
All India Certificate of Merit for the Third Best Feature Film	Unnaipol Oruvan	Tamil	Producer: Aasiya Jyothi films	Certificate only
All India Certificate of Merit for the Third Best Feature Film	Unnaipol Oruvan	Tamil	Director: D. Jayakanthan	Certificate only
All India Certificate of Merit for the Best Story Writer	Aarohi	Bengali	Balai Chand Mukhopadhyay	Certificate only

==== Regional Award ====
The awards were given to the best films made in the regional languages of India. With 12th National Film Awards, two more awards were introduced for the feature films made in English and Kashmiri language. These newly introduced categories includes President's Silver Medal for Best Feature Film and Certificate of Merit for second and third best film, although former was not given as no film was found suitable for the award.

Award	Film	Awardee(s)	
Award	Film	Producer	Director
Feature Films in Assamese
President's Silver Medal for Best Feature Film	Pratidhwani	Kamrup Chitra	Bhupen Hazarika
Feature Films in Bengali
President's Silver Medal for Best Feature Film	Aarohi	Asim Pal	Tapan Sinha
Certificate of Merit for the Second Best Feature Film	Anustup Chhanda	B. K. Productions	Pijush Bose
Feature Films in English
President's Silver Medal for Best Feature Film	The Avalanche	Serbjeet Singh	Serbjeet Singh
Feature Films in Hindi
President's Silver Medal for Best Feature Film	Dosti	Tarachand Barjatya	Satyen Bose
Certificate of Merit for the Second Best Feature Film	Yaadein	Sunil Dutt	Sunil Dutt
Certificate of Merit for the Third Best Feature Film	Geet Gaya Patharon Ne	V. Shantaram Productions	V. Shantaram
Feature Films in Kannada
President's Silver Medal for Best Feature Film	Chandavalliya Thota	Pals & Co.	T. V. Singh Thakur
Certificate of Merit for the Second Best Feature Film	Nava Jeevana	U. S. Vadhiraj	P. S. Moorthy
Certificate of Merit for the Second Best Feature Film	Nava Jeevana	U. Jawahar	P. S. Moorthy
Certificate of Merit for the Second Best Feature Film	Nava Jeevana	Bharathi Chitra	P. S. Moorthy
Certificate of Merit for the Third Best Feature Film	Mane Aliya	A. Subba Rao	S. K. A. Chari
Feature Films in Kashmiri
President's Silver Medal for Best Feature Film	Mainz-Raat	M. R. Seth	Shyam and Jagiram Paul
Feature Films in Marathi
President's Silver Medal for Best Feature Film	Pathlaag	Raja Paranjape	Raja Paranjape
Certificate of Merit for the Second Best Feature Film	Tuka Jhalase Kalas	N. G. Datar	Raja Nene
Certificate of Merit for the Third Best Feature Film	Sawaal Majha Aika!	Anant Govind Mane	Anant Govind Mane
Feature Films in Oriya
President's Silver Medal for Best Feature Film	Sadhana	Diamond Valley Production	Prabhat Mukherjee
Certificate of Merit for the Second Best Feature Film	Naba Janma	Pancha Sakha Pictures	Sachin Mukherji
Feature Films in Punjabi
President's Silver Medal for Best Feature Film	Jagga	K. B. Chadha	Jugal Kishore
Feature Films in Telugu
President's Silver Medal for Best Feature Film	Doctor Chakravarthy	D. Madhusudhana Rao	Adurthi Subba Rao
Certificate of Merit for the Second Best Feature Film	Ramadasu	V. Nagayya	V. Nagayya

=== Non-Feature films ===
Non-feature film awards were given for the documentaries, educational films and film strips made in the country. For 12th National Film Awards, no award was given in the filmstrip category and only Certificate of Merit was awarded for Educational Films. Following were the awards given for the non-feature films category:

==== Documentaries ====
Award	Film	Language	Awardee(s)	Cash prize
All India Certificate of Merit for the Best Documentary Film	One Day	English	Producer: Jagat Murari	Certificate of Merit and ₹ 1,000
All India Certificate of Merit for the Best Documentary Film	One Day	English	Director: S. N. S. Sastry	₹ 250
All India Certificate of Merit for the Second Best Documentary Film	All Under Heaven By Force	English	Producer: J. B. H. Wadia	Certificate of Merit only
All India Certificate of Merit for the Second Best Documentary Film	All Under Heaven By Force	English	Director: J. B. H. Wadia	Certificate of Merit only
All India Certificate of Merit for the Second Best Documentary Film	And Miles To Go	English	Producer: S. Sukhdev	Certificate of Merit only
All India Certificate of Merit for the Second Best Documentary Film	And Miles To Go	English	Director: S. Sukhdev	Certificate of Merit only

==== Educational films ====
Award	Film	Language	Awardee(s)	Cash prize
All India Certificate of Merit for the Best Educational Film	Sterilisation of the Female	Hindi	Producer: Films Division; Director: G. H. Saraiya	Certificate of Merit only

=== Awards not given ===
Following were the awards not given as no film was found to be suitable for the award:

- Prime Minister's Gold Medal for the Best Children's Film
- Prime Minister's Gold Medal for the Best Educational Film
