= Sila Nerangalil Sila Manithargal =

Sila Nerangalil Sila Manithargal (transl. Some people at some moments) may refer to:

- Sila Nerangalil Sila Manithargal (novel), a 1970 novel by Jayakanthan
- Sila Nerangalil Sila Manithargal (1977 film), based on the novel
- Sila Nerangalil Sila Manidhargal (2022 film), unrelated to the novel
