= Yaarukkaga Azhudhaan =

1966 film by Jayakanthan

- Theatrical release poster
- Directed by: Jayakanthan
- Written by: Jayakanthan
- Based on: Yaarukkaga Azhudhaan by Jayakanthan
- Produced by: Jayakanthan
- Starring: Nagesh; K. R. Vijaya; T. S. Balaiah; S. V. Sahasranamam; Wahab Kashmiri
- Cinematography: Nemai Ghosh
- Music by: S. V. Ramanan
- Production company: Asia Jothi Films
- Release date: 22 July 1966
- Running time: 111 minutes
- Country: India
- Language: Tamil

Yaarukkaga Azhudhaan (transl. For whom did he cry?) is a 1966 Indian Tamil-language thriller drama film written, produced and directed by Jayakanthan. It is based on his novel of the same name. The film stars Nagesh, K. R. Vijaya, T. S. Balaiah, S. V. Sahasranamam and Wahab Kashmiri. It deals with an intellectually disabled servant boy who is wrongly accused of theft in the lodge he works at.

Yaarukkaga Azhudhaan was released on 22 July 1966. Although the film received critical praise for its content and technique, it failed commercially, and Jayakanthan did not direct any film afterwards.

== Plot ==
Joseph is an intellectually disabled servant boy working at a lodge in Madras. An inebriated Sait, who arrives at the lodge to stay, gives his cash to the lodge owner for safekeeping. The next morning, the Sait has forgotten to whom he gave the cash, so he accuses Joseph. The owner exploits this situation and keeps the money. When interrogated, Joseph remains taciturn. A woman lodger who was deserted by her lover, tries to help, but only the return of the head cook Naidu, who was previously on vacation, discovers the truth and clears Joseph's name.

== Cast ==
- Nagesh as Joseph
- K. R. Vijaya as the woman lodger
- T. S. Balaiah as the lodge owner
- S. V. Sahasranamam as Naidu
- Wahab Kashmiri as the Sait

== Production ==
Yaarukkaga Azhudhaan was produced and directed by novelist Jayakanthan under his own banner Asia Jothi Films. It was his second directorial venture after Unnaipol Oruvan (1965), and based on his own novel of the same name. The original producer, G. N. Velumani, wanted Sivaji Ganesan and Savitri to star, with C. V. Sridhar as director; after principal photography began, Velumani backed out due to differences with Jayakanthan who took over as producer, with Nagesh and K. R. Vijaya cast instead. While primarily a melodrama, the film also included overtones of the thriller genre. Nagesh, then known primarily as a comedian, was cast against type in a serious role as the male lead Joseph. Since he was busy doing many films at that time, most of the shoot took place only at night. Vijayan was originally chosen for the role of Seth however he was finalised for the role of Kerala astrologer. Wahab Kashmiri went on to portray the role of Seth. The second schedule was shot at Newtone Studios. The cinematography was handled by Nemai Ghosh. The film had no dance sequences, and the music was composed by S. V. Ramanan. The film's final cut measured 4,813 metres (15,791 ft). Jayakanthan did not direct any further films after this, but did collaborate on the production of Sila Nerangalil Sila Manithargal (1977) and Oru Nadigai Natakam Parkiral and (1978), both adapted from his novels.

== Release and reception ==
Yaarukkaga Azhudhaan was released on 22 July 1966. Though the experimental film received praise for its content and technique, it was a commercial failure. Kalki lauded the film for eschewing Tamil cinema conventions such as fights and song sequences, and Nagesh's performance.

== Legacy ==
Writing for Madras Musings, Randor Guy praised the film for making a "strong socially relevant statement". Film historian S. Theodore Baskaran wrote that it brought a "whole new dimension" of Nagesh's acting ability, and that though film did not get much notice during its theatrical run, he was "lucky to catch it in its first few days in Chennai". He described the film as "very realistic natural cinema", praised Nagesh for "emoting more through body language than dialogue" and the cinematography by Ghosh, adding that the dialogues were "written so as to not divert the focus of the film."

== Bibliography ==
- Rajadhyaksha, Ashish; Willemen, Paul (1998) [1994]. Encyclopaedia of Indian Cinema. British Film Institute and Oxford University Press. ISBN 0-19-563579-5.
