= Brahmaputra Valley Film Festival =

- Location: Guwahati, Assam
- Founded: 2013
- Hosted by: Tattva Creations Pvt. Ltd.
- Language: English
- Website: brahmaputravalleyfilmfestival.com

The 7 Sisters North East International Film Festival which was previously called Brahmaputra Valley Film Festival (BVFF) is a film festival hosted in Guwahati, Assam, India annually since 2013.

== Short film contest ==
A short film contest is organised as a part of this film festival. This is done to promote talent and stories from the region. The winners of this contest not only receives recognition, but a chance as well to win prize money and opportunities to intern with the premier film production houses of the country.

== History ==
The inaugural edition of the festival was organized in 2013 on 11 & 12 January at Anuradha Cineplex, Guwahati. Renowned filmmakers Dibakar Banerjee, Zoya Akhtar, Reema Kagti and Anusha Rizvi graced the festival with their presence. Critically acclaimed Bollywood movies like Shanghai, Zindagi Naa Milegi Dobara, Taalash, Peepli live were screened at the festival. A short film contest was also organized along with the Brahmaputra Valley Film Festival. Romi Meitei's Kanngkhada Lin was awarded winner of the contest. Dominic Sangma's Karyukai inc. and Tarunabh Dutta's I am Not Crazy were adjusted as 1st and 2nd runner up short films respectively.

The second edition of the festival was held on 19th, 20th and 21st of April 2014 at Pragjyoti, ITA Machkhowa, Guwahati. Nationally internationally acclaimed film personalities Farhan Akhtar, Anurag Kashyap, Shoojit Sircar, Rahul Bose and Adil Hussain were special guests of the film festival. Some of the movies screened at the festival in 2014 were Positive, Konikar Ramdhenu, Everybody says I'm Fine, Echoes, Keibu Keioiba, Ka Lad, Madras Cafe, Kaafiron ki Namaaz, Yarwang, and Shorts among others. Steven Ao's Bamboo Shoots won the short film contest, whereas Romi Meitei's Karfew and Tribeny Rai's Rogi Sankhya 666 Ani Aru Haru were adjusted as 1st and 2nd runner up respectively. A lifetime achievement award was also introduced since 2014 to honour and acknowledge works of film personalities from Northeast India for their exceptional contribution to the cinema in Northeast. In 2014, the award was conferred to Shri Aribam Syam Sharma is a celebrated filmmaker from Manipur, India.

The third edition of the festival was organized in the year 2015 on the 24th, 25th and 26th of April at Pragjyoti ITA Centre, Machkhowa, Guwahati. Some of the important renowned film personalities such as Rajkumar Hirani, Kunal Kapoor, Rajkumar Rao, Shimit Amin, Patralekha Paul and Amit Roy participated at the film festival apart from the filmmakers and film enthusiasts from all across Northeast. Khawnglung Run, Riders of the Mists, Crossing Bridges, Ri: Homeland of Uncertainty, Raag and Othelo were some of the highly acclaimed films from the northeast were screened at the festival. Jivitesh Mazumdar's Lotkon was the winner of Brahmaputra Valley Short Film contest 2015. Kamal Paran's Mirrage and Porag Gogoi's A River Island Tale won the 1st and 2nd runner up titles respectively. Renowned and legendary Assamese filmmaker Shri Abdul Majid was Awarded with the Lifetime Achievement Award for the year 2015.

The fourth edition of the festival 2016 was held on 22nd, 23rd and 24th of July at Pragjyoti ITA Centre, Guwahati. The three day festival was filled with various events in the presence of the eminent film personalities like Imtiaz Ali, Prakash Jha, Ritesh Shah, Vandana Kataria and Amrit Pritam. Apart from the top 15 films from the short film contest, various films from different states of Northeast India such as Kima's Lode Beyond The Class, Out of the Blue, Eibusu Yaohanbiyu, Tezpur 1962 My Country Land, One Last Question, The Head Hunter, Doronir Nirola Poja were screened at the festival. Yesteryears Assamese actor Smt. Jnanada Kakoti was honored with the Lifetime Achievement Award in this year. The short film contest winner for the year was Romi Meitei from Manipur for his film Colour of Water. Meghalaya's Badeimon Kharshiing & Badeap K. Lyngdoh won the 1st runner up for their film U thlen and Assam's Manas Sagra won the 2nd runner up for his film Little Hearts.
