= George Baker (Indian actor) =

Indian actor and politician

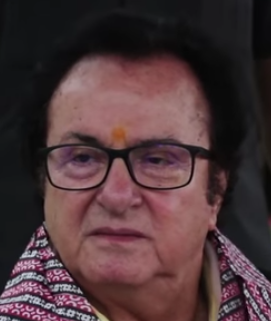

Member of Parliament for Anglo-Indian reserved seats
- In office 23 July 2015 – 23 May 2019

Personal details
- Born: 28 October 1946 (age 79) Tezpur, Assam Province, British India
- Party: Bharatiya Janata Party
- Spouse: Arpita Baker
- Education: La Martiniere Lucknow
- Occupation: Actor; politician
- Known for: Cinema of West Bengal, Cinema of Assam, Bharatiya Janata Party

George Baker (born 28 October 1946) is an Indian actor and politician. He is primarily known for his works in Bengali and Assamese language films. He is one of the two members of parliament appointed by the president under Article 331 (Anglo-Indian) of the Indian Constitution. He joined the Bharatiya Janata Party in 2014 and contested and lost the Lok Sabha elections from the Howrah constituency during the 2014 Indian general election.

== Early life and education ==
George Baker was born into a Greek family. His parents migrated to India via Britain shortly before he was born. His initial education was in Lucknow at La Martiniere College. He was a National level junior in Boxing and Swimming during this period. He later joined the Assam Engineering College but had to leave midway since his father died. He completed a two-year course in Permanent Way Engineering and joined the Northeast Frontier Railway zone in the Engineering Department. He served there for two years and then quit to start his own business.

== Acting career ==
Baker made his first foray into Assamese cinema in 1974. He played the protagonist in the Assamese film Chameli Memsaab. This film went on to win the National Film Award for Best Feature Film in Assamese at the 23rd National Film Awards. He played the role of Berkeley, a British planter who falls for a native girl, Chameli, (played by Binita Borgohain) and is later accused for her murder. Baker later played the same role in the Bengali version of the same movie.

He went on to act in numerous Bengali movies, Jatra, television films, serials mostly playing parts of British Expatriates. He has also been part of roving theatre groups.

Over the years he has acted in films of five languages – Assamese, Bengali, English, Hindi and Santhali.

More recently he played the role of Sir William Eckhardt in Parineeta and Mr. Ramsey in Bhooter Bhabishyat.

== Political career ==
On 27 February 2014, the Bharatiya Janata Party announced Baker as their candidate for the 2014 Indian general election from the Howrah (Lok Sabha constituency).

On 23 July 2015, he was appointed to the 16th Lok Sabha as one of the two appointed members representing the Anglo-Indian community along with Richard Hay.

On 24 June 2017, he was attacked by a mob, allegedly composed of Trinamool Congress members, and then hospitalised.

== Filmography ==
Year	Film	Role	Language	Director	Co-Actor
1975	Chameli Memsaab	Berkeley	Assamese	Abdul Majid	Binita Borgohain
1976	Adalat		Assamese	Dilip Deka	Dinesh Das
1979	Chameli Memsaheb	Berkeley	Bengali	Indor Sen	Anil Chatterjee; Rakhee Gulzar
1982	Amrita Kumbher Sandhaney		Bengali	Dilip Roy	Aparna Sen; Bhanu Bannerjee; Anup Kumar
1983	Amar Geeti		Bengali	Tarun Majumdar	Satya Bannerjee; Biswajeet; Soumitra Chatterjee; Rabi Ghosh; Anup Kumar; Chinmoy Roy
1984	Devi		Assamese	Sambhu Gupta and Dara Ahmed	Biju Phukan; Dolly Gupta
1988	Pratipaksha		Bengali	Rathish Dey Sarker	Prasenjit Chatterjee; Rameshwari; Utpal Dutt
1988	Boba Sanai		Bengali	Ajit Ganguly	Rameshwari; Chiranjit
1988	Anjali		Bengali	Anjan Choudhury	Ranjit Mallick; Moon Moon Sen; Kali Bannerjee; Madhabi Mukherjee
1993	Priyojon		Assamese	Wisekurni Bora	Mridula Baruah
2002	Desh		Bengali	Raja Sen	Jaya Bhaduri; Sabyasachi Chakraborty; Subhendu Chatterjee; Abhishek Bachchan; Nayana Das
2004	Bow Barracks Forever		English	Anjan Dutt	Victor Banerjee; Roopali Ganguly; Sohini Pal; Moon Moon Sen; Sabyasachi Chakraborty; Arindam Sil
2005	Parineeta	Sir William Eckhardt	Hindi	Pradeep Sarkar	Saif Ali Khan; Vidya Balan; Sanjay Dutt; Dia Mirza
2007	Minister Fatakeshto	Raj Burman	Bengali	Swapan Saha	Mithun Chakraborty; Deepankar De; Koel Mallick; Soumitra Chatterjee
2008	Love		Bengali	Riingo Banerjee	Koyel Mallick; Jisshu Sengupta
2012	Bhooter Bhabishyat	Mr. Ramsey	Bengali	Anik Dutta	Swastika Mukherjee; Parambrata Chatterjee; Sabyasachi Chakraborty

== See also ==
- Bharatiya Janata Party
- Howrah
- Cinema of Assam
- Cinema of West Bengal
- Jatra (theatre)
- Northeast Frontier Railway zone
- Tezpur
- Santhali
