= Chameli =

Chameli may refer to:

- Chameli (flower), the Hindi name for Jasminum grandiflorum in India
- Chameli (film), a 2004 Indian Hindi-language film directed by Sudhir Mishra, starring Kareena Kapoor

== See also ==
- "Chikni Chameli", a song by Shreya Ghoshal from the 2012 Indian film Agneepath
- Chameli Devi Jain Award for Outstanding Women Mediapersons, India
- Chameli Ki Shaadi, 1986 Indian film by Basu Chatterjee
- Chameli Memsaab, 1975 Indian film
