= Parinay =

- Directed by: Kantilal Rathod
- Written by: Vinay Shukla; Kantilal Rathod; Harin Mehta
- Screenplay by: Vinay Shukla; Kantilal Rathod
- Produced by: Samantar Chitra
- Starring: Romesh Sharma; Shabana Azmi; Asha Sachdev; Dinesh Thakur; Preeti Ganguly; T.P. Jain
- Cinematography: K. K. Mahajan
- Music by: Jaidev
- Release date: 1 January 1974 (India)
- Country: India
- Language: Hindi

Parinay (literally Espousal) is a 1974 Indian Hindi-language film directed by Kantilal Rathod and produced by Samantar Chitra. The film starred Romesh Sharma and Shabana Azmi, with Asha Sachdev, Dinesh Thakur, Preeti Ganguly and T.P. Jain in the supporting cast. Released on 1 January 1974, this film was associated with Saregama (known as "The Gramophone Company of India Limited" at that time). The screenplay was by Rathod and Shukla, whereas the cinematography was by K. K. Mahajan.

Written by the trio of Vinay Shukla, Rathod and Harin Mehta, Parinay won the 1974 Nargis Dutt Award for Best Feature Film on National Integration (known as the "Rajat Kamal Special Award for the Best Feature Film on National Integration" at that time) presented by the Directorate of Film Festivals (DFF). The DFF also gave Samantar Chitra Private Limited a Rajat Kamal (Silver Lotus), ₹30,000 (equivalent to ₹900,000 or US$11,000 in 2023), and a certificate; Rathod got a Rajat Kamal, ₹10,000 (equivalent to ₹300,000 or US$3,500 in 2023), and a certificate. Azmi and Sharma got a medallion each by the DFF.

== Cast ==
- Romesh Sharma
- Shabana Azmi
- Asha Sachdev
- Dinesh Thakur
- Preeti Ganguly
- T.P. Jain
- Amitabh Bachchan as Narrator

== Plot ==
Ram, an idealist, has one ambition to do something good for his village. Rekha, a rich girl, falls in love with Ram and takes up a job as a tour guide in the city so that they can be together.

== Soundtrack ==
Jaidev was the music director; Anup Jalota, Manna Dey and Vani Jairam were the singers. The lyricists were Ramanand Sharma and Naqsh Lyallpuri. The most popular song of the film, Jaise Suraj Ki Garmi Se, was sung by Sharma Bandhu.

== See also ==
- List of Bollywood films of 1974
