= Eibusu Yaohanbiyu =

- Poster
- Directed by: Maipaksana Haorongbam
- Written by: Dr. L. Sanahal
- Produced by: Yumnam Hitalar (Neta)
- Starring: Thounaojam Khelemba Meetei
- Cinematography: A. Bikeshwor Sharma
- Edited by: Hodam Tommy
- Music by: Missile Khumancha; Ksh. Surjit Meetei
- Production companies: Living Art, Chajing
- Distributed by: Living Art, Chajing
- Release date: November 2015 (ICFFI)
- Running time: 106 minutes
- Country: India
- Language: Meiteilon (Manipuri)

Eibusu Yaohanbiyu (English: Let Me Join You) is a 2015 Manipuri film directed by Maipaksana Haorongbam and produced by Yumnam Hitalar (Neta) Singh, under the banner of Living Art, Chajing Productions. It is co-produced by Th. Sudhir Meetei and Oinam Inakhunbi Devi. The film won the National Film Award for Best Feature Film in Manipuri at the 63rd National Film Awards. It was officially selected for International Competition at 20th International Children's Film Festival India (ICFFI). It also got selection at the 4th Brahmaputra Valley Film Festival 2016 and Habitat Film Festival 2016.

== Cast ==
- Thounaojam Khelemba Meetei
- Ningthouja Jayvidya
- Yengkhom Ingocha
- Ayekpam Shanti
- Ningthoujam Rina
- Angom Phiroj
- Prafullo Chandra
- H. Pradip Singh
- Y. Lopesh Singh
- Thounaojam Rabina Chanu
- Thounaojam Sanatombi Chanu

== Accolades ==
The film won the Best Regional Feature Film in Manipuri Language in the 63rd National Film Awards held in 2016. The citation for the National Award reads, "A moving film about the victory of a differently-abled boy’s attempt to join a football team".

Maipaksana Haorongbam won the Best Direction award at the 10th edition of the Manipur State Film Awards 2015-16.
