= Ma.Ama =

- Poster
- Directed by: Dominic Sangma
- Produced by: Xu Jianshang; Dominic Sangma
- Starring: Philip Sangma; Brilliant Marak; Hailin Sangma
- Cinematography: Acharya Venu
- Edited by: Hira Das
- Music by: Anon Cheran Momin; Gabriel Ga’re Momin
- Release date: 26 October 2018
- Running time: 123 minutes
- Country: India
- Language: Garo

Ma.Ama (transl. Longing mother) is a 2018 Indian Garo language film directed by Dominic Sangma. Produced by Xu Jianshang, Dominic Sangma Co-producer by Tojo Xavier, the film stars Philip Sangma, Brilliant Marak and Hailin Sangma. The film was screened at the Mumbai Academy of the Moving Image -Mami in 2018. The film won the National Film Award for Best Feature Film in Garo at India's 66th National Film Awards.

== Plot ==
Ma.Ama narrates the story of the 90-year old protagonist who has lived every day of the past 30 years waiting to be reunited with his dead wife, Anna.

== Reception ==
=== Critical response ===
Nandini Ramnath of Scroll.in Wrote "In one sequence in Ma.Ama, Philip finishes bathing and casually chucks his briefs at his second wife to be washed – another unscripted moment that was reshot for the film".
