= Uruvangal Maralam =

- Poster
- Directed by: S. V. Ramanan
- Written by: S. V. Ramanan
- Produced by: S. V. Ramanan; Ramji; Raghu
- Starring: Y. G. Mahendran; Suhasini
- Music by: S. V. Ramanan
- Production company: R3 Movie Makers
- Release date: 14 January 1983
- Country: India
- Language: Tamil

Uruvangal Maralam (pronounced [uɾuʋaŋɡaɭ maːralaːm] transl. Forms can change) is a 1983 Indian Tamil-language drama film written, produced and directed by S. V. Ramanan who also composed the film's soundtrack. The film stars Y. G. Mahendran and Suhasini, with Sivaji Ganesan, Jaishankar, Kamal Haasan and Rajinikanth playing different forms of God in guest appearances. Based on the 1977 American film Oh, God!, it was released on 14 January 1983.

== Plot ==
Ramalingam believes in a formless God more than anything else in this world and worships all forms of Gods right down to newspaper clippings. He works in a bank where he is constantly mocked. Even his wife looks down upon this habit of his.

He is once called by God, which he initially considers a prank, who tells him that he has to inform people about the various things about to happen in the future. He starts believing that the person he spoke to, in form of Sivaji Ganesan, is God when he is summoned to 18th floor of a 7th floor building through a lift when he is unable to replicate.

Ramalingam starts his task of telling people, but no one believes him in the beginning. However, his "predictions" of train accident, among others, start to happen in real time. Slowly when what he says starts occurring people term him a powerful monk and start coming to him. God takes several other famous actor forms and keeps hinting the world through Ramalingam. One day, God tells Ramalingam that his son is going to die. The tables turn and Ramalingam starts cursing God though he still keeps his faith. In the end, he is arrested as a terrorist for pointing out a train accident before it happened, something one cannot know without inside knowledge. God appears in court which the judge mocks. God disappears in front of all to show he is God and Ramalingam is not insane. God gives Ramalingam his son back saying this is why God no longer interferes in human affairs.

== Cast ==
- Y. G. Mahendran as Ramalingam
- Suhasini as Lakshmi
- S. Ve. Shekher
- K. A. Thangavelu as Punnaaku Punniyakotti
- Thengai Srinivasan as Thengai Srinivasan working in Press
- Vennira Aadai Moorthy as Manager
- Manorama as Goddess
- Bindu Ghosh as Kuchipudi Sabalam
- Silk Smitha
- Loose Mohan

Sivaji Ganesan, Jaishankar, Kamal Haasan and Rajinikanth make guest appearances as different forms of God.

== Production ==
Uruvangal Maralam is Y. G. Mahendran's 100th film as an actor. Sivaji Ganesan, Kamal Haasan, Rajinikanth and Jaishankar played different forms of God in guest appearances. Ganesan's scenes were filmed in one day. Haasan also choreographed one song in the film, "Kamanukku Kaman". This was the first film where Rajinikanth appeared as Raghavendra, a role he would reprise in a full-fledged manner in Sri Raghavendrar (1985).

== Soundtrack ==
The soundtrack was composed by the director S. V. Ramanan.

Track listing
No.	Title	Lyrics	Singers	Length
1.	"Vanil Vazhum"	Raghu	S. P. Balasubrahmanyam, Vani Jairam
2.	"Andavane Unnai"	Vairamuthu	M. S. Viswanathan
3.	"Kamanukku Kaman"	Raghu	S. P. Balasubrahmanyam
4.	"Ganamrutham"	Raghu	Swarnalatha, S. N. Surendar & Chorus

== Critical reception ==
Thiraignani of Kalki praised the acting of entire star cast and also praised the music, dialogues and direction of Ramanan. Anna praised Ramanan's music and direction, Ramji's dialogues, and the acting of the cast.
