= 23rd National Film Awards =

Indian ceremony celebrating cinema of 1975

- Awarded for: Best of Indian cinema in 1975
- Awarded by: Directorate of Film Festivals
- Presented on: 1976
- Site: New Delhi
- Official website: dff.nic.in

Highlights
- Best Feature Film: Chomana Dudi
- Dadasaheb Phalke Award: Dhirendra Nath Ganguly
- Most awards: • Apoorva Raagangal; • Chomana Dudi (3)

The 23rd National Film Awards, presented by Directorate of Film Festivals, the organisation set up by Ministry of Information and Broadcasting, India to felicitate the best of Indian Cinema released in the year 1975.

At 23rd National Film Awards, two new awards were introduced for the short films category for Best News Review and Best Newsreel Cameraman. These newly introduced awards includes Rajat Kamal (Silver Lotus) and a Certificate. Over the years, these two awards are discontinued.

== Awards ==
Awards were divided into feature films and non-feature films.

Awards were also renamed with 23rd National Film Awards. President's Gold Medal for the All India Best Feature Film renamed to National Film Award for Best Feature Film, whereas President's Gold Medal for the Best Documentary Film is to National Film Award for Best Non-Feature Film. For children's films, Prime Minister's Gold Medal is renamed as National Film Award for Best Children's Film. At the regional level, President's Silver Medal for Best Feature Film is renamed as National Film Award for Best Feature Film in a particular language.

=== Lifetime Achievement Award ===
Name of Award	Image	Awardee(s)	Awarded As	Cash prize
Dadasaheb Phalke Award		Dhirendra Nath Ganguly	Actor and Director	Swarna Kamal, ₹20,000 and a Shawl

=== Feature films ===
Feature films were awarded at All India as well as regional level. For 23rd National Film Awards, a Kannada film, Chomana Dudi won the President's Gold Medal for the All India Best Feature Film also winning the maximum number of awards (three) with the Tamil film Apoorva Raagangal. Following were the awards given in each category:

==== All India Award ====
Following were the awards given:

Award	Film	Language	Awardee(s)	Cash prize
Best Feature Film	Chomana Dudi	Kannada	Producer: Ashok Kumar	Swarna Kamal, ₹40,000 and a Certificate
Best Feature Film	Chomana Dudi	Kannada	Director: B. V. Karanth	Rajat Kamal, ₹15,000 and a Certificate
Second Best Feature Film	Mausam	Hindi	Producer: P. Mallikharjuna Rao	Rajat Kamal, ₹15,000 and a Certificate
Second Best Feature Film	Mausam	Hindi	Director: Gulzar	Rajat Kamal, ₹10,000 and a Certificate
Best Feature Film with Mass Appeal, Wholesome Entertainment and Aesthetic Value	Tapasya	Hindi	Producer: Rajshri Productions	Swarna Kamal and a Certificate
Best Feature Film with Mass Appeal, Wholesome Entertainment and Aesthetic Value	Tapasya	Hindi	Director: Anil Ganguly	Rajat Kamal and a Certificate
Best Direction	Jana Aranya	Bengali	Satyajit Ray	Rajat Kamal, ₹20,000 and a Certificate
Best Cinematography (Black and White)	Apoorva Raagangal	Tamil	B. S. Loknath	Rajat Kamal, ₹5,000 and a Certificate
Best Cinematography (Color)	Muthyala Muggu	Telugu	Ishan Arya	Rajat Kamal, ₹5,000 and a Certificate
Best Actor	Chomana Dudi	Kannada	M. V. Vasudeva Rao	Rajat Kamal, ₹10,000 and a Certificate
Best Actress	Mausam	Hindi	Sharmila Tagore	Rajat Kamal, ₹10,000 and a Certificate
Best Male Playback Singer	Hamsageethe	Kannada	M. Balamuralikrishna	Rajat Kamal and a Certificate
Best Female Playback Singer	Apoorva Raagangal	Tamil	Vani Jairam	Rajat Kamal and a Certificate
Best Music Direction	Chameli Memsaab	Assamese	Bhupen Hazarika	Rajat Kamal, ₹10,000 and a Certificate
Best Story	Chomana Dudi	Kannada	K. Shivaram Karanth	Rajat Kamal, ₹10,000 and a Certificate

==== Regional Award ====
The awards were given to the best films made in the regional languages of India. For feature films in English, Gujarati, Kashmiri, Meitei, Oriya and Punjabi, President's Silver Medal for Best Feature Film was not given.

All the awardees are awarded with 'Silver Lotus Award (Rajat Kamal)', a certificate and cash prize. The producer and director of the film were awarded with ₹10,000 and ₹5,000, respectively.

Award	Film	Awardee(s)	
Award	Film	Producer	Director
Best Feature Film in Assamese	Chameli Memsaab	Seuj Bolechari Santha	Abdul Majid
Best Feature Film in Bengali	Palanka	Filmarts, Calcutta	Rajen Tarafdar
Best Feature Film in Hindi	Nishant	Freni M. Variava	Shyam Benegal
Best Feature Film in Hindi	Nishant	Mohan J. Bijlani	Shyam Benegal
Best Feature Film in Kannada	Hamsageethe	M/s. Anantha Lakshmi Films	G. V. Iyer
Best Feature Film in Malayalam	Swapnadanam	T. Mohamed Babu	K. G. George
Best Feature Film in Marathi	Samna	Ramdas Phutane	Jabbar Patel
Best Feature Film in Tamil	Apoorva Raagangal	D. Jayalakshmi	K. Balachander
Best Feature Film in Tamil	Apoorva Raagangal	G. Vijayalakshmi	K. Balachander
Best Feature Film in Telugu	Muthyala Muggu	M. V. L. Narasimha Rao	Bapu

=== Non-Feature films ===
For 23rd National Film Awards, two new awards were introduced for the short films category for Best News Review and Best Newsreel Cameraman. These newly introduced awards includes Rajat Kamal (Silver Lotus) and a Certificate. Over the years, these two awards are discontinued.

==== Short films ====
Award	Film	Language	Awardee(s)	Cash prize
Best Information Film (Documentary)	Winged Wonderland	English	Producer: Shanti Varma	Rajat Kamal, ₹5,000 and a Certificate
Best Information Film (Documentary)	Winged Wonderland	English	Director: Shanti Varma	Rajat Kamal, ₹5,000 and a Certificate
Best Educational / Instructional Film	Induced Breeding	English	Producer: K. K. Kapil	Rajat Kamal, ₹5,000 and a Certificate
Best Educational / Instructional Film	Induced Breeding	English	Director: Suraj Joshi	Rajat Kamal, ₹4,000 and a Certificate
Best Film on Social Documentation	Baster Rhythm Of Progress	English	Producer: Chandrashekhar Nair	Rajat Kamal, ₹5,000 and a Certificate
Best Film on Social Documentation	Baster Rhythm Of Progress	English	Director: Chandrashekhar Nair	Rajat Kamal, ₹5,000 and a Certificate
Best Commercial Promotional Film (Advertisement)	Zenith of India	English	Producer: Film Media, Bombay	Rajat Kamal and a Certificate
Best Commercial Promotional Film (Advertisement)	Zenith of India	English	Director: Jyoti G. Thakur	Rajat Kamal and a Certificate
Best Promotional Film (Non-Commercial)	Poems in Pattern	English	Producer: Ranabir Ray	Rajat Kamal and a Certificate
Best Promotional Film (Non-Commercial)	Poems in Pattern	English	Director: Ranabir Ray	Rajat Kamal and a Certificate
Best Experimental Film	Awashesh	Hindi	Producer: FTII	Rajat Kamal, ₹5,000 and a Certificate
Best Experimental Film	Awashesh	Hindi	Director: Girish Kasaravalli	Rajat Kamal, ₹4,000 and a Certificate
Best Animation Film	Business is People	English	Producer: Akbar Films, Bombay	Rajat Kamal, ₹5,000 and a Certificate
Best Animation Film	Business is People	English	Director: Kantilal Rathod	Rajat Kamal, ₹4,000 and a Certificate
Best News Review	Indian News Review No. 1399	–	N. V. K. Murthy	Rajat Kamal and a Certificate
Best Newsreel Cameraman	Flood Havocs (Indian News Review No. 1399)	–	A. S. Agnihotri	Rajat Kamal and a Certificate
Best Newsreel Cameraman	Flood Havocs (Indian News Review No. 1399)	–	Abinashi Ram	Rajat Kamal and a Certificate
Best Newsreel Cameraman	Flood Havocs (Indian News Review No. 1399)	–	A. R. Saroef	Rajat Kamal and a Certificate

=== Awards not given ===
Following were the awards not given as no film was found to be suitable for the award:

- Best Film on Family Welfare
- Best Children's Film
- Best Lyrics
- Best Feature Film on National Integration
- Best Child Artist
- Best Screenplay
- President's Silver Medal for Best Feature Film in English
- President's Silver Medal for Best Feature Film in Manipuri
- President's Silver Medal for Best Feature Film in Oriya
- President's Silver Medal for Best Feature Film in Punjabi
