= Pampally =

Film director and screenwriter

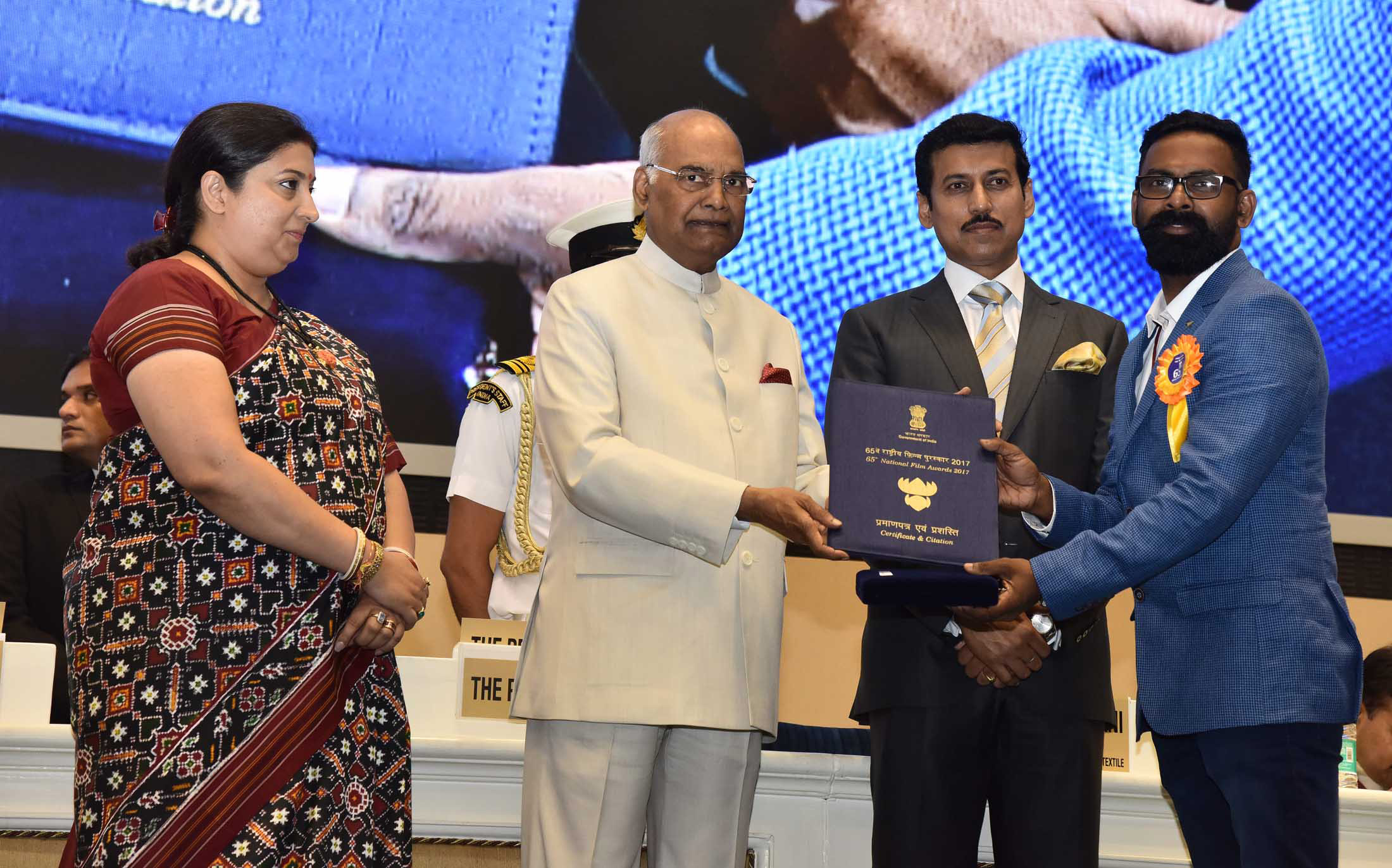
- Pampally receiving the Indira Gandhi Award for best debut film.
- Born: Pampally; 22 March 1979 (age 47); Pantheeramkavu, Kozhikode, Kerala, India
- Occupations: Film director; screenwriter
- Spouse: Surabhi
- Awards: 65th National Film Award - Best Debut director, Best Movie in Jasari language

Pampally (born 1979), is an Indian film director and screenwriter from Kerala state.

His debut feature film, Sinjar, was selected as the Best Feature Film in Jasari and the Best Debut Film of a Director at the 65th National Film Awards in 2018.

Pampally became a Jury Member of the 67th National Film Awards and a selection committee member for India's official entry in best foreign language film category of Oscar Awards 2021, organized by the Film Federation of India.

== Awards ==
Year	Book/Cinema	Category	Organization
2018	Sinjar (Feature Film)	Indira Gandhi Award for Best Debut Film of a Director	65th National Film Awards 2017
2018	Sinjar (Feature Film)	Best Movie in Jasari	65th National Film Awards 2017

== Filmography ==
Year	Title	Director	Screenwriter	Awards
2012	Lorry Girl	✓	✓	
2017	Sinjar	✓	✓	National Film Awards
Pre-Production	Statue of Liberty	✓	✓	

== Personal life ==
Pampally married Surabhi in 2022, who works at Directorate of Health Services under Government of Kerala. They met each other in Tagore theatre during IFFK 2016 and later in 2022 they got married. Their marriage went viral as they went straight to Tagore theatre for IFFK 2022 after their marriage in marriage costume to watch an Italian movie Lord of the Ants. They were received in IFFK 2022 by director Ranjith (director) who is the chairman of Kerala State Chalachitra Academy and other IFFK officials.
