= Abhi To Jee Lein =

- Poster
- Directed by: Roshan Taneja
- Written by: Roshan Taneja
- Starring: Kiran Kumar; Radha Saluja; Danny Denzongpa; Jaya Bachchan
- Music by: Sapan Jagmohan
- Release date: 8 July 1977
- Country: India
- Language: Hindi

Abhi To Jee Lein (lit. 'Live this moment') is a 1977 Bollywood drama film directed and written by Roshan Taneja.

== Plot ==
Deepak comes from an upper-middle-class family, studies in college, and woos fellow collegian, Rita, who is also in love with him. In his friend's circle there are Danny and his girlfriend Jaya. Rakesh, another student, teases Jaya and she slaps him. The group has several run ins with Rakesh and his gang, Then it is time for College Students' Association Elections, and there is hectic activity within the campus, which is complicated by the active involvement of outside, quite violent elements, who are not students. In this virulent atmosphere, Rakesh attempts to kidnap and molest Jaya. Deepak, Danny & their friend Mukesh come to her rescue, and Rakesh gets killed. The elections are postponed, and the trio are on the run from the police – who have launched a manhunt for them. The College Principal announces fresh elections, and with no one to challenge outside elements, it looks like the campus will be taken over by political parties – who may have a vested interest in canvassing the future vote in India's elections – leading to even more chaos and instability.

== Cast ==
- Jaya Bachchan as Jaya
- Kiran Kumar as Deepak
- Radha Saluja as Rita
- Danny Denzongpa as Danny
- Simi Garewal as Ms. Mahajan (Lecturer)
- Farida Jalal as Nun
- Paintal as Bunty
- Iftekhar as Deepak's Father
- Surendra as Mukesh
- Shashi Kiran as Shashi

== Playback singers ==
- Kishore Kumar
- Asha Bhosle

== Music ==
1. "Too Lali Hai Savere Wali" - Kishore Kumar, Asha Bhosle
2. "Jab Raam Naam Le Le Har Kaam Ho Jaaye, Jitni Badi Ho Mushkil Aasan Ho Jaaye" - Kishore Kumar
3. "Principal Murdabad Management Murdabad" - Kishore Kumar
4. "Kabhi Chali Aa Aashiko Ki Gali" - Kishore Kumar, Asha Bhosle
5. "Na Jaane Agla Pal Hoga Kaisa" - Kishore Kumar
6. "Kayi Gham Sahi Hai Khushi Ke Liye" - Kishore Kumar
