= The Awakener (film) =

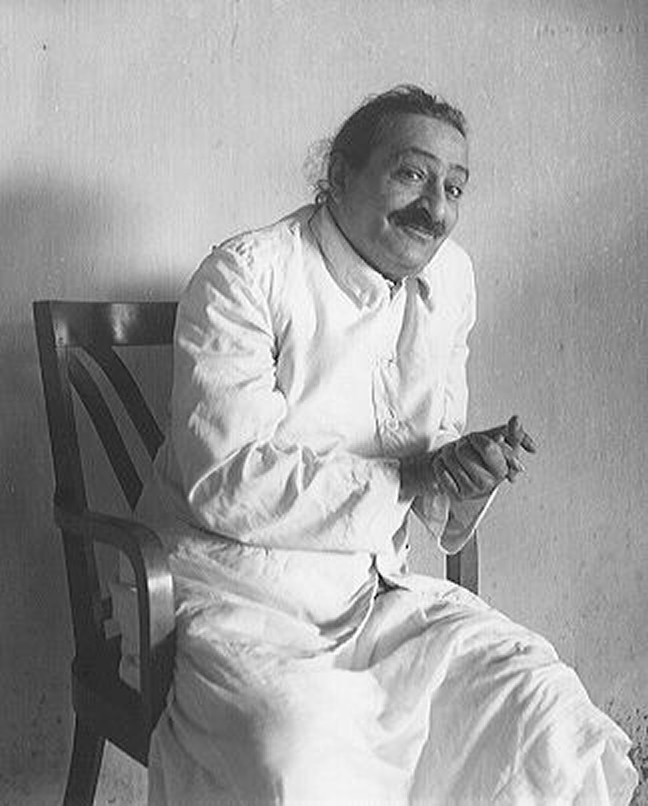
- Directed by: D. B. Rana
- Produced by: Jagat Murari
- Starring: Meher Baba; Eruch Jessawala; Louis van Gasteren
- Narrated by: Roshan Taneja
- Edited by: D. B. Rana
- Music by: Chandavarkar; Rajinder Gandhi
- Distributed by: Films Division of India
- Release date: 1969
- Running time: 118 min
- Country: India

The Awakener is a 1969 Indian anthropological ethnographic film on Meher Baba, produced by Jagat Murari, Mushir Ahmad and distributed by Films Division of India. The stock footage starring Meher Baba, and Eruch Jessawala is directed, compiled, and edited by D. B. Rana with narration by Roshan Taneja.

== Background ==
The film footage was taken by Lud Dimpfl, Aneece Hassen, Jehangir Sukhadwala, and Mani Irani. It was featured at the 4th IFFI. The film also features the footage of Dutch film maker Louis van Gasteren interviewing Meher Baba.
