= Chhoti Chhoti Baten =

1965 film directed by Motilal

- Directed by: Motilal
- Written by: Motilal
- Produced by: Motilal
- Starring: Motilal; Nadira; Moti Sagar
- Cinematography: Keki Mistry
- Edited by: Shivaji Avdhoot
- Music by: Anil Biswas; Shailendra (lyrics)
- Production company: Rajvanshi Productions
- Release date: 1965
- Running time: 120 min.
- Country: India
- Language: Hindi

Chhoti Chhoti Baten is a 1965 Indian Hindi family drama film directed by actor Motilal. It was his only film as director, writer and producer under his home banner, Rajvanshi Productions. It starred Motilal, Nadira and Moti Sagar in lead roles.

The music of the film was by Anil Biswas, his last film before retiring from Bollywood and joining All India Radio. It is noted for the song "Zindagi Khwab Hai Tha Hamein Bhi" performed by Mukesh, and the Lata Mangeshkar-Mukesh duet, "Zindagi Ka Ajab Afsana Hai". Dances were choreographed by Kathak exponent Lachhu Maharaj, who also choreographed Mughal-e-Azam (1960) and Pakeezah (1972).

Director Motilal Rajvashi, a noted character actor from the 1940s till the 1960s made his directorial debut through this film. However, he died before film's release, and despite critical acclaim, the offbeat family drama flopped at the box office.

Composer Anil Biswas said that the film's post-production was overseen by singer Mukesh, a distant cousin of Motilal, as the actor lay in hospital.

At the 13th National Film Awards, it won the award for Certificate of Merit for the Third Best Feature Film and Certificate of Merit for the Best Story Writer was awarded posthumously to Motilal.

The film explores theme of humanity, helping others, society, trust, importance of money and relationships. It was featured in the book Take 2 – 50 Films That Deserve a New Audience by Deepa Gehlot, who described the story as -

"a story of one man’s good fortune, his attempts to help others and a tragic outcome".

In a 1963 interview, Motilal had said the following about the film, and his character -

"He has an air of ineffable sadness and, inside of him, he is full of goodness to the world—a world which hasn’t been all good to him, in which he finds ultimate dignity only in death.

His name is Motilal, too. I play him in “Chhoti Chhoti Batein”, the film I have laboured much to put together bit by bit.

This is my most recent role but the one I have wanted to do longest. In visualising the Motilal of my film, a suburban philosopher, a man who is silently asking himself: “Where is peace?” and is led on from corner to corner, I have borrowed of myself, of many echoes from all my yesterdays"

== Plot ==
Motilal is a clerk in Bombay, who lives with his wife (Leela Mishra), two children, Munni and Suresh, and a servant Shyam. The family manages on a modest income, and Motilal sacrifices minor comforts like traveling in a bus (he walks in the sun instead) but always gives in to demands of his self-involved wife and kids.

One day, lawyers Lal & Lal inform him that he has inherited money from his deceased cousin who had set up business in Africa. Motilal asks lawyer Girish to arrange material things (house, car showroom, etc.) desired by his family and deposits some money for them as well. He resigns from his job. Then he sets off on a journey in search of peace. He lands up in a village Chandanpur, after being told about it by a train ticket collector, Rajan.

Motilal rents a house from Chowdhary, and his daughter Radha arranges the place for him. Motilal is surprised by the helpful nature of villagers like Radha, and his neighbor, Thakur Saheb (Rajan's uncle).

He also meets Shanta (Nadira) in a boat, whose boatmen saves Motilal from drowning in the lake. Shanta lives with her sister and brother in law (called Seth in the film), who is lecherous by nature. Thakur also saves Shanta a couple of time when she's walking alone, from her lewd brother-in-law.

Shanta paints and teaches village kids. Motilal gives space in his rented house to them for a temporary school. He also helps villagers by providing a tractor for farming, when they need assistance as disease affected bulls could not plough the fields.

Motilal's son Suresh comes to meet him, repentant about not respecting his father, losing money in gambling and throwing out trusted servant Shyam. Suresh helps with farming as he knew how to drive the tractor. He falls in love with Radha, and she likes him too. When Radha goes to Delhi to take her final exams to become a doctor, Motilal and Suresh come to know she's a child widow. Motilal tells Chowdhary that old customs should be done away with and arranges for Suresh to marry Radha.

Village elders also decide to build a permanent hospital and school, with funds provided by Motilal, whose philosophy is to help those he can. Suresh leaves to get Motilal's wife and daughter to the village.

Meanwhile, Seth behaves indecently with Shanta when she's coming back alone and then turns her sister against her. Homeless, she stays at Motilal's house for the night. Motilal, aware that a single lady spending the night at his place could be considered improper, goes to his neighbor, Thakur Saheb's house for the night. Thakur and Motilal play chess and then he sleeps there.

The following morning, rumors spread about Shanta at Motilal's house, and Seth adds fuel to fire. Villagers humiliate Motilal before he can defend himself. Saddened at the turn of events, Motilal leaves the house. As he looks over from a distance, he asks God to forgive the villagers for insulting him and not trusting him.

When Thakur Saheb learns about the incident, he tells everyone the truth, that Motilal was with him for the night. Thakur also exposes Seth's vulgar ways, the villagers thrash Seth. Lawyer Girish, Suresh, Motilal's wife and his daughter Munni also arrive in the village, and they all look for Motilal, to meet and apologize to him. Finally, they all find him under a tree, deceased.

== Cast ==
- Motilal as Motilal
- Nadira as Shanta
- Moti Sagar as Suresh, Motilal's son
- Manju
- Kumar
- Mubarak
- Krishan Dhawan as Girish, Motilal's lawyer
- Sangeeta
- Leela Mishra as Motilal's wife
- Mridula
- Daya Devi

== Music ==
Music in the film was given by Anil Biswas, with lyrics by Shailendra.

- "Kuchh Aur Zamaana Kahata Hai" - Meena Kapoor
- "Alwida" - Mukesh
- "Lakadi Jal Koyalaa Bhayi, Mori Baali Re Umariyaa Ab Kaise" - Lata Mangeshkar
- "Zindagi Ka Ajab Afsana Hai" - Lata Mangeshkar, Mukesh
- "Zindagi Khvaab Hai, Thaa Hamen Bhi Pataa" - Mukesh
- "Kya Laaye Kya Le Jaaoge Khali Rahenge Dono Haath" - Manna Dey
- "Andhi Duniya Matlab Ki Duniya" - Manna Dey

The song "Kuchh Aur Zamaana Kahata Hai" is set in raga Gaud Sarang.

== Bibliography ==
- Raheja, Dinesh; Kothari, Jitendra (1996). The Hundred Luminaries of Hindi Cinema. India Book House Publishers. ISBN 978-81-7508-007-2.
- Anantharaman, Ganesh (2008). Bollywood Melodies: A History of the Hindi Film Song. Penguin Books India. ISBN 978-0-14-306340-7.
