= 13th National Film Awards =

Indian ceremony celebrating cinema of 1965

- Awarded for: Best of Indian cinema in 1965
- Awarded by: Ministry of Information and Broadcasting
- Official website: dff.nic.in

Highlights
- Best Feature Film: Chemmeen
- Most awards: Shaheed (3)

The 13th National Film Awards, then known as State Awards for Films, presented by Ministry of Information and Broadcasting, India to felicitate the best of Indian Cinema released in 1965.

Starting with 13th National Film Awards, a new award was introduced at All India level, Best Feature Film on National Unity and Emotional Integration whose winner received a cash prize.

== Awards ==
Awards were divided into feature films and non-feature films.

President's gold medal for the All India Best Feature Film is now better known as National Film Award for Best Feature Film, whereas President's gold medal for the Best Documentary Film is analogous to today's National Film Award for Best Non-Feature Film. For children's films, Prime Minister's gold medal is now given as National Film Award for Best Children's Film. At the regional level, President's silver medal for Best Feature Film is now given as National Film Award for Best Feature Film in a particular language. Certificate of Merit in all the categories is discontinued over the years.

=== Feature films ===
Feature films were awarded at All India as well as regional level. For the 13th National Film Awards, a Hindi film Shaheed won the maximum number of awards (three). Following were the awards given:

==== All India Award ====
For 13th National Film Awards, none of the films were awarded from Children's Films category as no film was found to be suitable; instead Certificate of Merit is awarded. Following were the awards given in each category:

Award	Film	Language	Awardee(s)	Cash prize
President's gold medal for the All India Best Feature Film	Chemmeen	Malayalam	Producer: Babu Ismail Settu	Gold Medal and ₹20,000
President's gold medal for the All India Best Feature Film	Chemmeen	Malayalam	Producer: Kanmani Films	Gold Medal and ₹20,000
President's gold medal for the All India Best Feature Film	Chemmeen	Malayalam	Director: Ramu Kariat	₹5,000
All India Certificate of Merit for the Second Best Feature Film	Atithi	Bengali	Producer: New Theaters Pvt Ltd.	Certificate of Merit and ₹10,000
All India Certificate of Merit for the Second Best Feature Film	Atithi	Bengali	Director: Tapan Sinha	₹2,500
All India Certificate of Merit for the Third Best Feature Film	Chhoti Chhoti Baten	Hindi	Producer: Rajvanshi Productions	Certificate of Merit only
All India Certificate of Merit for the Third Best Feature Film	Chhoti Chhoti Baten	Hindi	Director: Motilal Rajvansh	Certificate of Merit only
All India Certificate of Merit for the Best Story Writer	Chhoti Chhoti Baten	Hindi	Motilal Rajvansh	Certificate of Merit only
All India Certificate of Merit for the Best Story Writer	Shaheed	Hindi	B. K. Dutt	Certificate of Merit only
All India Certificate of Merit for the Best Story Writer	Shaheed	Hindi	Din Dayal Sharma	Certificate of Merit only
Best Feature Film on National Unity and Emotional Integration	Shaheed	Hindi	Producer: Kewal Kashyap	₹20,000
Best Feature Film on National Unity and Emotional Integration	Shaheed	Hindi	Director: S. Ram Sharma	₹20,000
All India Certificate of Merit for the Best Children's Film	The Adventure of A Sugar Doll	English	Producer: Children's Film Society	Certificate of Merit and ₹2,000
All India Certificate of Merit for the Best Children's Film	The Adventure of A Sugar Doll	English	Director: Kantilal Rathod	₹500
All India Certificate of Merit for the Best Children's Film	As You Like It	English	Producer: Children's Film Society	Certificate of Merit only
All India Certificate of Merit for the Best Children's Film	As You Like It	English	Director: S. Shankar	Certificate of Merit only

==== Regional Award ====
The awards were given to the best films made in the regional languages of India. For feature films in Gujarati and Punjabi, President's silver medal for Best Feature Film was not given, instead Certificate of Merit for Best Feature Film was given.

Award	Film	Awardee(s)	
Award	Film	Producer	Director
Feature Films in Bengali
President's silver medal for Best Feature Film	Akash Kusum	Ranjit Basu	Mrinal Sen
Certificate of Merit for the Second Best Feature Film	Subarnarekha	Radheshyam	Ritwik Ghatak
Certificate of Merit for the Third Best Feature Film	Raja Rammohun	Aurora Films Corp Pvt Ltd.	Bijoy Basu
Feature Films in Gujarati
Certificate of Merit for the Best Feature Film	Kusumbi No Rang	Manoobhai N. Gadhvi	G. K. Mehta
Feature Films in Hindi
President's silver medal for Best Feature Film	Shaheed	Kewal Kashyap	S. Ram Sharma
Certificate of Merit for the Second Best Feature Film	Oonche Log	M/S Chitrakala	Phani Majumdar
Certificate of Merit for the Third Best Feature Film	Guide	Dev Anand	Vijay Anand
Feature Films in Kannada
President's silver medal for Best Feature Film	Sathya Harishchandra	K. V. Reddy	Hunsur Krishnamurthy
Certificate of Merit for the Second Best Feature Film	Miss Leelavathi	K. S. Jagan Nath	M. R. Vittal
Certificate of Merit for the Third Best Feature Film	Maduve Madi Nodu	Nagireddy	Hunsur Krishnamurthy
Certificate of Merit for the Third Best Feature Film	Maduve Madi Nodu	Chakrapani	Hunsur Krishnamurthy
Feature Films in Malayalam
President's silver medal for Best Feature Film	Kavyamela	T. E. Vasudevan	M. Krishnan Nair
Certificate of Merit for the Second Best Feature Film	Odayil Ninnu	P. Ramaswamy	K. S. Sethumadhavan
Certificate of Merit for the Third Best Feature Film	Murappennu	K. Parameswaran Nair	A. Vincent
Feature Films in Marathi
President's silver medal for Best Feature Film	Sadhi Mansa	Lilabai Bhalji Pendharkar	Bhalji Pendharkar
Certificate of Merit for the Second Best Feature Film	Nirmon (Konkani)	Frank Fernand	A. Salam
Certificate of Merit for the Third Best Feature Film	Yuge Yuge Me Vaat Pahili	Babasaheb S. Fatehlal	C. Vishwanath
Feature Films in Punjabi
Certificate of Merit for the Best Feature Film	Sassi Punnu	M/s. Filmistan Pvt. Ltd.	S. P. Bakshi
Feature Films in Tamil
President's silver medal for Best Feature Film	Kuzhandaiyum Deivamum	AVM Productions	Krishnan–Panju
Certificate of Merit for the Second Best Feature Film	Thiruvilayadal	Vijayalakshmi Pictures	A. P. Nagarajan
Feature Films in Telugu
President's silver medal for Best Feature Film	Antastulu	V. B. Rajendra Prasad	V. Madhusudhana Rao
Certificate of Merit for the Second Best Feature Film	Palnati Yudham	Y. Lakshmaya Choudaray	Gutha Ramineedu
Certificate of Merit for the Third Best Feature Film	Manushulu Mamathalu	Adurthi Subba Rao	K. P. Atma

=== Non-feature films ===
Non-feature film awards were given for the documentaries, educational films and film strips made in the country. For the 13th National Film Awards, no award was given in the filmstrip category and only Certificate of Merit was awarded for Educational Films. Following were the awards given for the non-feature films category:

==== Documentaries ====
Award	Film	Language	Awardee(s)	Cash prize
All India Certificate of Merit for the Best Documentary Film	Cloven Horizon	English	Producer: Kantilal Rathod	Certificate of Merit and ₹2,000
All India Certificate of Merit for the Best Documentary Film	Cloven Horizon	English	Director: Kantilal Rathod	₹500
All India Certificate of Merit for the Second Best Documentary Film	Across India	English	Producer: Films Division	Certificate of Merit only
All India Certificate of Merit for the Second Best Documentary Film	Across India	English	Director: Gopal Datt	Certificate of Merit only

==== Educational films ====
Award	Film	Language	Awardee(s)	Cash prize
All India Certificate of Merit for the Best Educational Film	Play Better Hockey	English	Producer: Children's Film Society	Certificate of Merit only
All India Certificate of Merit for the Best Educational Film	Play Better Hockey	English	Director: Shanti S. Verma	Certificate of Merit only

=== Awards not given ===
Following were the awards not given as no film was found to be suitable for the award:

- Prime Minister's gold medal for the Best Children's Film
- President's gold medal for the Best Documentary Film
- Prime Minister's gold medal for the Best Educational Film
- President's silver medal for Best Feature Film in Assamese
- President's silver medal for Best Feature Film in English
- President's silver medal for Best Feature Film in Oriya
- President's silver medal for Best Feature Film in Punjabi
