= S. V. Ramanan =

India media personality (died 2022)

- Died: 26 September 2022
- Occupations: Radio and television personality, musician
- Spouse: Bama
- Children: 2
- Father: K. Subramanyam

S. V. Ramanan (died 26 September 2022) was an Indian radio and television personality, and musician. He was the son of filmmaker K. Subramanyam.

== Career ==
Ramanan started his career by assisting his father K. Subramanyam, but later went to work as voice actor for radio and television industries while also directing several documentaries and television serials. He also directed a film called Uruvangal Maralam (1983), and composed the music for Takkar Baby, an unreleased film, alongside Gangai Amaran. Ramanan produced more than three hundred advertisement films and thousands of radio and television advertisement jingles under his advertisement agency Jayasree Pictures. He worked as a part-time director at the Chennai Film Education Institute when it started, and one of his commercials (True Energy) was honoured as the best production at the Chicago International Film Festival. He directed an interview of Rajinikanth which aired on DD Podhigai in 1995.

== Personal life ==
Ramanan was married to Bama and had two daughters Lakshmi and Saraswathi. His grandsons Anirudh Ravichander and Hrishikesh are a music composer and actor respectively. Ramanan's sister Padma Subrahmanyam is a Bharatanatyam dancer.

== Filmography ==
=== As Film Director ===
Year	Film
1981	Uruvangal Maralam

=== As composer ===
Year	Film
1966	Yaarukkaga Azhudhaan
1981	Uruvangal Maralam

=== As TV serial Director ===
- Mariyadhai
- Manithargal
- Athamnajali
- Pariso Parisu
- Podunalam Ponnusamy
- Kavichakravarthy Kamban
- Pichamma Sabatham
- Archanai Malargal
