= Lorry Girl =

- Directed by: Pampally
- Written by: Pampally
- Produced by: Pampally Productions
- Starring: Sharran Puthumana; Rani Sarran; Meghna Vincent; Aadarsh Nair
- Cinematography: Prasad Kavilpad
- Edited by: Shaleesh Lal
- Music by: Dileep Singh
- Release date: 1 December 2012
- Country: India
- Language: Malayalam

Lorry Girl is a 2012 Malayalam short film written and directed by Pampally and produced by Pampally Productions. This short film is one has a social message for modern society. It has been screened worldwide on 1 December 2012, World AIDS Day, at 14 centers in Kerala, and in all main cities in India and in many countries around the world.

== Plot ==
Lorry Girl tells the story of a prostitute Lakshmi, who sells her body to lorry drivers, out of helplessness rather than choice. She is a compassionate woman, and she is in love with Kannan, a lorry driver. She is very protective of her only daughter Kani. The plot revolves around the relations of Kannan-lakshmi-kani.

Lorry Girl was created specifically to instill awareness of the need to eradicate AIDS and stresses the need of using condoms.

== Cast ==
The leading characters of Lorry Girl are Lachu (Lakshmi), Kannan and Kani. The main character Lakshmi is played by Rani Sharan.

== Preview on World Aids Day ==
The Lorry Girl has been shown at more than 30 centres, all at 6.30 PM on the 1st day of December, 2012, World AIDS Day.
