= Roshan Taneja =

Indian teacher of acting

Roshan Taneja (1931 - 10 May 2019) was a pioneer in teaching acting in India. He set up the acting department at the Film and Television Institute of India, and founded the Roshan Taneja School of Acting in Mumbai, India. He coached several actors from the Indian film industry. He also wrote and directed the Hindi film Abhi To Jee Lein (1977).

== Early life and career ==
Taneja's family migrated from Kulachi, in the North Western Frontier Province (now in Pakistan) to Kanpur, India, where his father worked in a sugar mill. After the partition of India, his family settled in Lucknow, and he went to study at Delhi University. After graduating, he went to study acting in New York under a scholarship. He trained under director Sydney Pollack and Sandford Meisner at the Neighbourhood Playhouse School of Theatre, and learned method acting.

He returned to India and set up the acting department at the Film and Television Institute of India (FTII), Poona in 1963. He taught at the institute until 1975, conducting two-year acting courses, where the class included 10 male and 10 female students. His students included Jaya Bhaduri, Shabana Azmi, Naseeruddin Shah, Om Puri, Shatrughan Sinha, and Mithun Chakraborty. Shabana Azmi said that the acting lessons she learnt at the time continued to guide her later. By the late 60's, auditions for the course were happening at four centres - Delhi, Bombay, Calcutta and Madras, where one thousand candidates were shortlisted for the final auditions in Bombay.

At FTII, he directed the staff film Are We Doing All This? (1967) with Shatrughan Sinha on student life, and the short film Ode To Youth (1971).

He left FTII in 1975, and founded the Roshan Taneja School of Acting the following year. Initially it was called Taneja's Actors' Studio, and he conducted one-year acting courses. The faculty included his former students from FTII - Mithun Chakraborty, Benjamin Gilani, Tom Alter, Om Puri, and Geeta Khanna. Among the students who passed out from his first batch included Anil Kapoor, Gulshan Grover and Mazhar Khan. Taneja's other students included Parveen Babi, Kumar Gaurav, Sunny Deol, Sanjay Dutt, Govinda, Aamir Khan, Madhuri Dixit, Sunil Shetty, and Ajay Devgan.

In 2009, his students honoured him by celebrating 45 years of his teaching career. In 2017, FTII conducted an event "Guruvandana" in his honour.

Taneja also wrote and directed the 1977 film Abhi To Jee Lein, and narrated the 1969 documentary film The Awakener.

== Personal life ==
He was married to Mithika and has two sons Rohit and Rahul. In 2017, he released his autobiography Moments of Truth: My Life with Acting, at an event "Guruvandana" at FTII.

== Bibliography ==
- Moments of Truth: My Life with Acting, Roshan Taneja, Bloomsbury Publishing, 2017, ISBN 9789386432179
