= Jayakanthan =

Indian writer, journalist, filmmaker

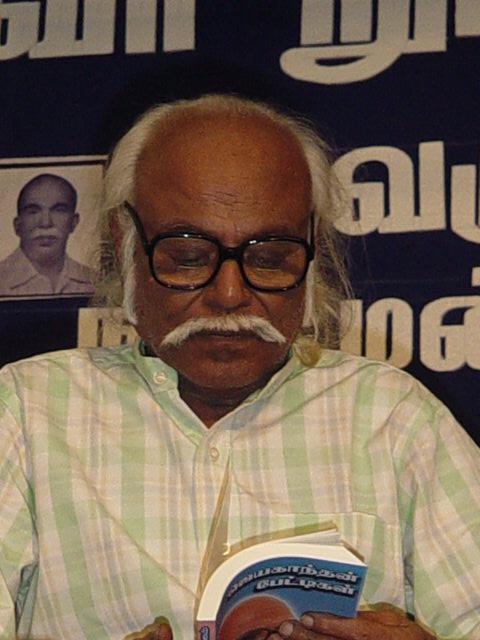
- Jayakanthan in 2012
- Born: 24 April 1934; Cuddalore, Madras Presidency, British India (now in Tamil Nadu, India)
- Died: 8 April 2015 (aged 80); Chennai, Tamil Nadu, India
- Occupations: Novelist, short story writer, screenplay writer, Film director
- Writing career
- Language: Tamil
- Subject: Literature
- Notable awards: Padma Bhusan (2009), Jnanpith Award (2002), Sahitya Akademi Award (1972), Order of Friendship (2011)

D. Jayakanthan (24 April 1934 – 8 April 2015), popularly known as JK, was an Indian writer, journalist, orator, filmmaker, critic and activist. Born in Cuddalore, he dropped out of school at the age of 9 and went to Madras, where he joined the Communist Party of India. In a career spanning six decades, he authored around 40 novels, 200 short stories, apart from two autobiographies. Outside literature, he made two films. In addition, four of his other novels were adapted into films by others.

Jayakanthan's literary honours include Jnanpith and Sahitya Akademi awards. He was also a recipient of Padma Bhushan (2009), India's third-highest civilian honour, the Soviet Land Nehru Award (1978), and the Russian government's Order of Friendship (2011).

== Biography ==
Jayakanthan was born in 1934 into a family of agriculturists in Manjakuppam, a suburb of Cuddalore, a part of the South Arcot District of the erstwhile Madras Presidency. Brought up by his mother and maternal uncles, he got interested in politics at a young age as his uncles were actively involved in it. As a child, he was highly inspired by the works of Subramania Bharati. Jayakanthan dropped himself out of school after completing fifth grade, as he thought studies would hinder his political activism.

In 1946, he left for Madras (now Chennai) in search of livelihood, where he performed odd jobs, before ending up as a compositor in the printing press of Communist Party of India (CPI). His association with the CPI, instilled the ideas of the movement, where he got to accompany leaders such as P. Jeevanandham, Baladandayutham and S. Ramakrishnan. The leaders of the party encouraged him to write. After graduating to an active member of the party, he got to learn about topics pertaining to world literature, culture, politics, economics and journalism. It was during this time, Jayakanthan started writing for pro-communist magazines. Over the next few years, he established himself as one of the top-most writers in the party. His early works were first published in the party newspaper Janasakthi, and soon other magazines like Sarasvathi, Thamarai, Santhi, Manithan, Sakthi and Samaran published his works. His early works focussed on the plight of slum-dwellers who were settled in and around the party office.

Jayakanthan wrote his first short story for a Tamil magazine titled Sowbakiyavathi, which got it published in 1953. Following early success, Jayakanthan started writing for mainstream magazines such as Ananda Vikatan, Kumudam and Dinamani Kadir, who published a number of short-stories particularly in the 1960s. In 1964, Jayakanthan entered films by co-producing and directing a venture titled Unnaipol Oruvan, based on his novel. The film focussed on the plight of slum-dwellers. Although a commercial failure, it won the President's Certificate of Merit for the Third Best Feature Film in 1965. The following year he made another film based on his namesake novel Yaarukkaga Azhudhaan which had Nagesh playing the lead role. His novel Sila Nerangalil Sila Manithargal (1970) won him the Sahitya Akademi Award (for Tamil) in 1972. Later this was adapted into a film of the same name by A. Bhimsingh, which won a National Film Award. Promoted by the film's success, Bhimsingh made one more film tilted Oru Nadigai Naadagam Paarkiral, based on his namesake novel.

In 2008, Ravisubramaniyan made a documentary film on Jayakanthan, the second of its kind, and was produced by Ilaiyaraaja. In 2011, Sila Nerangalil Sila Manithargal was adapted into a Malayalam television series Chila Nerangalil Chila Manushyar. In February 2014, Jayakanthan was admitted into a private hospital in Chennai following illness. Following a brief illness, he was discharged after a year, and died on 8 April 2015.

In 2017 his award-winning novel Oru Manithan Oru Veedu Oru Ulagam is being made as a feature film by award-winning filmmaker Kumar G. Venkatesh.

A musical tribute to Jayakanthan was released by Bava Chelladurai, Bharathi Baskar and Jeyamohan on 24 April 2023 as part of Jayakanthan's birthday celebration. Composer Raleigh Rajan selected three of Jayakanthan's poems and created the musical tribute sung by Sathyaprakash.

== Personal life, influences and political views ==
Jayakanthan was married to his cousin Gnanambikai, who worked as a primary school teacher. The couple had two daughters and a son - J Kadambari, J Jayasimhan, and J Deepalakshmi. Born in a family that had a lot of political activists, Jayakanthan became interested in politics at a young age. He became a strong supporter of the CPI ever since joining the party in the 1950s. He was coaxed to join politics by K. Baladhandayutham of the CPI. While he stood up against the Dravida Munnetra Kazhagam and its leaders for a majority of his lifetime, he supported the CPI leaders for "Nehruvian socialism" and had a great admiration Indira Gandhi. He quit the CPI, and later joined the Tamil Desiyak Katchi, founded by E. V. K. Sampath, before joining the Indian National Congress.

Despite his recognition and popularity as an exceptional Tamil author in multiple genres, Jayakanthan's entry into electoral politics did not end successfully. He contested the 1977 Tamil Nadu Legislative Assembly election, as an Independent candidate in the Theagaraya Nagar constituency and could poll only 481 votes (0.64%). He had remarked the Liberation Tigers of Tamil Eelam as a "fascist" organisation. This extremist view of Jayakanthan is resented by Sri Lankan Tamils, and attribute it to his knowledge deficit on the history of Sri Lankan Tamils.

== Literary style and themes ==
A majority of Jayakanthan's works revolve around the lives of underclass people like rickshaw-pullers, prostitutes and rag-pickers. In an interview, he said that during his initial days in Chennai he spent his life amidst such people. This prompted him to develop a liking towards them.

== Criticism ==
Prolific Tamil writer Jeyamohan has written numerous articles about the fictional world in Jayakanthan's works, and also had extensively discussed it in his book Mannum Marabum along with several other authors. Major Tamil critic M. Vedhasagayakumar has made a comparative study on the works of Jayakanthan and Pudhumaipithan. Jayanthasri Balakrishnan did her doctoral research study in Tamil on complete novellas of Jayakanthan.

A full-length documentary made by filmmaker Ravi Subramaniam and other essays by several Tamil writers written after the death of the writer are also considered notableworks on him.

== Works of Jayakanthan ==
=== Non-fiction ===
- Oru Ilakkiyavaathiyin Arasiyal Anubhavangal (lit. Political experiences of a literary person; 1974)
- Oru Ilakkiyavaathiyin Kalaiyulaga Anubhavangal (lit. Experiences of a literary person in the world of art; 1980)

=== Novels and novelettes ===
- Vazhkkai Azhaikkiradhu. 1957
- Kaivilanggu. 1961
- Yarukkaka Azhuthan?. 1962
- Birammopadhesam. 1963
- Piralayam. 1965
- Karunaiyinal Alla. 1965
- Rishimoolam. 1965
- Yosikkum Velayil (lit. While thinking; 1982)
- Parisukkup Po!. 1966
- Kokila Enna Seythu Vittal?. 1967
- Sila Nerangalil Sila Manithargal. 1970
- Oru Nadikai Nadakam Parkkiral. 1971
- Cinemavukkup Pona Siththal. 1972
- Oru Manidhan Oru Vidu Oru Ulakam. 1973
- Jaya Jaya Sankara. 1977
- Ganggai Engge Pogiral. 1978
- Oru Kudumpaththil N^Adakkirathu. 1979
- Pavam, Ival Oru Pappaththi!. 1979
- Enggenggu Kaninum. 1979
- Oorukku Nooruper. 1979
- Karikkodukal. 1979
- Munggil Kattu Nila. 1979
- Oru Manidhanum Sila Erumaimadukalum. 1979
- Ovvoru Kuraikkum Kizhe. 1980
- Pattimarkalum Peththimarkalum. 1980
- Appuvukku Appa Sonna Kadhaikal. 1980
- Kaththirukka Oruththi. 1980
- Karu. 1981
- Aydha Pusai. 1982
- Sunthara Kandam. 1982
- Isvara Alla There Nam. 1983
- O, Amerikka!. 1983
- Illadhavarkal. 1983
- Idhaya Ranikalum Ispedu Rajakkalum. 1983
- Karru Veliyinile. 1984
- Kazhuththil Vizhuntha Malai. 1984
- Andha Akkavaiththedi. 1985
- Innum Oru Pennin Kadhai. 1986

=== Film adaptations ===
- Unnaipol Oruvan (1965; screenwriter and director)
- Kaaval Dheivam (1968) Story (kaivilangu)
- Yaarukkaga Azhudhaan (1966; also screenwriter and director)
- Sila Nerangalil Sila Manithargal (1977)
- Oru Nadigai Natakam Parkiral (1978)
- Ooruku Nooruper (2001)
- Oru Manithan Oru Veedu Oru Ulagam (2017)
- Sarovaram (1993) Malayalam

=== Short stories ===
Jayakanthan's portfolio includes 200 short stories.

- Yugasanthi
- Illadhadhu Yedhu
- Irandu Kuzhanthaigal
- Naan Irukkiren
- Bommai
- Devan Varuvaara
- Thuravu
- Poo Uthirum
- Kuraippiravi
- Enthiram
- Treadle
- Pinakku
- Nandavanthil Oar Aandi (made into Pithamagan)
- Nee Inna Sir Solra?
- Puthiya Vaarpugal
- Suya Tharisanam
- Agrahaarathu Poonai
- Agni Pravesam
- Puthu Seruppu Kadikkum
- Naan Enna Seiyattum Sollungo?
- Gurupeetam
- Tea Kadai Samiyaarum Tractor Saamiyaarum
- Nikki
- Oru Veedu Poottikkidakkirathu
- Naan Jannalaruge Utkarnthirukkiren
- Gurukkal Aathu Paiyan
- Munnilavum Pinpaniyum
- Mutrugai
- Sumaithangi
- Nadaipaathaiyil Gnaanopathesam
- Oru Bhakthar

=== Essays ===
- Bharathi Padam (1974)
- Imayaththukku Appal (1979)

== Awards and honours ==
- Sahitya Akademi Award for Sila Nerangalil Sila Manithargal (1972)
- Soviet Land Nehru Award in (1978)
- Fellow of Sahitya Akademi (1996)
- Jnanpith Award (2002)
- Padma Bhushan (2009)
- Order of Friendship (2011)
- Tamil Nadu State Film Award for Best Story Writer (1978)

== See also ==
- List of Sahitya Akademi Award winners for Tamil
- List of Indian writers
- List of Tamil-language writers
