= Aarohi (film) =

Bengali film

Aarohi is a Bengali comedy drama film directed by Tapan Sinha and produced by Ashim Pal, based on a story by Balai Chand Mukhopadhyay. This film was released on 4 September 1964 under the banner of Goldwin Pictures and went on to receive the 12th National Film Awards for Best Story (1964) as well as the President's Silver Medal.

== Cast ==
- Kali Bannerjee
- Bikash Roy
- Ajitesh Bannerjee
- Chhaya Devi
- Rabi Ghosh
- Jahor Roy
- Dilip Roy
- Chinmoy Roy
- Shyam Laha
- Sipra Mitra
- Tapan Bhattacharya
