= Unnaipol Oruvan (1965 film) =

1965 film by Jayakanthan

- Poster
- Directed by: Jayakanthan
- Written by: Jayakanthan
- Based on: Unnaipol Oruvan by Jayakanthan
- Produced by: Jayakanthan
- Starring: R. Gandhimathi; P. Udhayan; S. Prabhakar; A. K. Veerasamy
- Cinematography: S. Natarajan
- Edited by: R. G. Gopu
- Music by: Chitti Babu
- Production company: Asiajothi Films
- Distributed by: Asiajothi Films
- Release date: 27 February 1965
- Country: India
- Language: Tamil

Unnaipol Oruvan (transl. A Man Like You) is a 1965 Indian Tamil-language drama film written, co-produced and directed by Jayakanthan. Based on his novel of the same name, the film was his directorial debut. The film stars R. Gandhimathi, P. Udhayan, S. Prabhakar and A. K. Veerasamy. It had no songs with the background score composed by Chitti Babu. The film won the Third Best Feature Film at the 12th National Film Awards in 1965.

== Plot ==
After being abandoned by her lover, Thangam, a construction worker, lives in a slum with her only son Chitti Babu. Chitti grows up as an irresponsible boy until he meets the owner of an ice cream factory. The owner preaches to him the importance of one's mother and further provides him with a job in his factory and gives him an admission to study in his night school. A reformed Chitti then takes up the burden of supporting his mother financially.

During this time, an astrologer Manickam enters the slum and starts living there. Thangam gets fond of him and becomes pregnant with his child. Upon her insistence, Manickam joins her and starts living with the family. A good hearted Manickam shows fatherly affection towards Chitti, but Chitti who is possessive about his mother does not reciprocate his love for him. A mentally disturbed Chitti leaves home and stops going to work. Manickam understands the situation and leaves the house. Chitti on hearing this, returns home and starts living with his mother but remains indifferent. His behaviour affects Thangam emotionally. She soon gives birth to a baby girl and dies. It takes some time for Chitti to understand that he is an orphan and decides to take care of his sister.

== Cast ==
Actresses

- R. Gandhimathi as Thangam
- S. N. Lakshmi
- N. Saroja
- G. Sulochana
- A. J. Umadevi
- N. Bhanumathi
- Kamalamma

Actors

- P. Udhayan as Chitti Babu
- S. Prabhakar as Manickam
- A. K. Veerasamy as the ice cream factory owner
- K. G. Arjunan
- A. Ananthasayanam
- A. Thamizhanandam
- G. Dhanapal
- M. G. Murugan
- Loose Arumugam

== Production ==
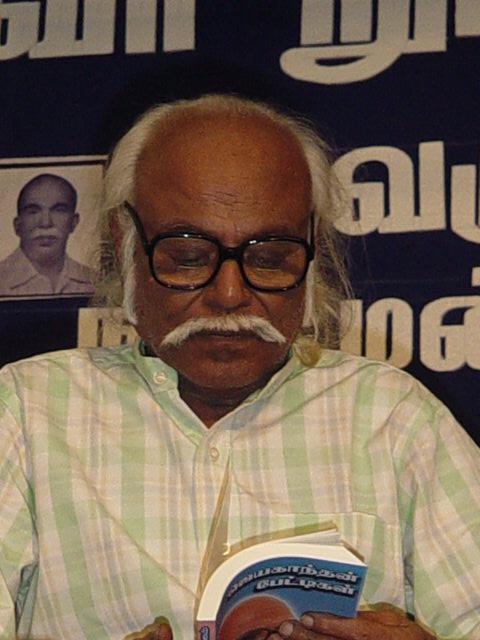
Unnaipol Oruvan was Jayakanthan's (pictured in 2012) directorial debut.

Unnaipol Oruvan was a novel written by Jayakanthan, and serialised in the magazine Ananda Vikatan. Jayakanthan was encouraged by members of the Communist Party of India, with whom he was associated, to make a film based on his stories. Venus Krishnamurthy, a Tamil film distributor, had earlier informed Jayakanthan that he was ready to produce a film based on one of Jayakanthan's stories. Jayakanthan, on the encouragement of his friends and Communist party members, met Krishnamurthy and told his idea of making a film adaptation of Unnaipol Oruvan.

Krishnamurthy was impressed with the novel and asked Jayakanthan to write the script. Jayakanthan completed the script in 10 days and showed it to Krishnamurthy, who after hearing the script, remarked that it resembled a typical Bengali film and did not have any entertaining aspects featuring in it. Jayakanthan and his friends took the criticism seriously and walked out. He formed a production company with his friends and named it Asiajothi Films.

The film was made on a shoestring budget of almost ₹1 lakh (worth ₹3 crore in 2021 prices). Principal photography of the film began on the Diwali day of 1964. Members of the Seva-stage troupe were signed up to play principal roles in the film. Filming was completed in 21 days. The film had no songs, and the background score was composed by Chitti Babu.

== Release and reception ==
The film was censored on 30 December 1964 and sent for the 12th National Film Awards (1964). However, it got released only on 27 February 1965. Jayakanthan released the film himself as the distributors backed out citing there were no known actors in the film. It won the Third Best Feature Film at the National Film Awards ceremony. The film is widely considered by the critics as the first neorealistic film in Tamil cinema. It started a new wave and is seen as a trendsetter for realistic films in Tamil cinema.

Despite receiving critical acclaim, the film was a failure at the box office. It was also screened at the Soviet Union. Politician K. Kamaraj appreciated the film, saying the Government must enable the public to watch this film freely so that the message of the film could reach out better and to larger audiences. French film critic Georges Sadoul praised it as a "neo-realistic masterpiece". As of September 2013, no print of the film was known to survive, seemingly making it a lost film. However, Jayakanthan's family posted the film on his birth anniversary 24 April 2023 on YouTube. Ananda Vikatan, in a review dated 7 February 1965, wrote that Jayakanthan was bringing in a new wave with the film. The reviewer added that the realistic and new wave film would making everyone watch it at least once.

== Bibliography ==
- Dhananjayan, G. (2014). Pride of Tamil Cinema: 1931–2013. Blue Ocean Publishers. OCLC 898765509.
- Raghavendra, M. K., ed. (2017). Beyond Bollywood: The Cinemas of South India. HarperCollins. ISBN 9789352645701.
