= Sharma Bandhu =

- Origin: Muzaffarnagar, Uttar Pradesh, India
- Genre: Hindustani classical music
- Labels: His Master's Voice, T-Series, Venus Music, TIPS
- Members: Gopal Sharma; Kaushlendra Sharma; Reghvendra Sharma; Shukdev Sharma
- Website: www.sharmabandhu.com

Sharma Bandhu (Sharma Brothers) (Hindi: शर्मा बन्धु) refers to four Indian classical vocalist brothers, who perform bhajan and Hindu devotional music. They were born in the music family of Pandit Jyoti Prasad and Pandit Munshi Ram to the student of Pandit V. D. Paluskar, founder of Gandharva Mahavidyalaya. Quartet consists of the Pandit Gopal Sharma, Pandit Shukdev Sharma, Pandit Kaushalendra Sharma and Pandit Raghavendra Sharma.

Sharma brothers have been most famous for singing "Suraj Ki Garmi Se Jalte Hue Tan Ko" for 1974 Best Feature Film on National Integration winning Hindi film Parinay (1974).

== Background ==
The four brothers were born in Muzaffarnagar town in state of western Uttar Pradesh, India, to Pandit Ramanand, son of Pandit Munshiram, in the family of Hindi-Urdu poet and Sanskrit translator Pandit Jyoti Prasad. Pandit Ramanand was a student of Hindustani musician Pandit Vishnu Digambar Paluskar and a popular singer and exponent of Ramcharitmanas of his time. Pandit Ramanand along with his younger brother Pandit Shiv Kumar sang Tulsidas's Ramcharitmanas, Vinaya Patrika etc. and originated, and were also the exponents of their own style called Shri Ram Darbar Shaily (style) for 60 years.

== Performing career ==
The four real brothers, Pt. Gopal Sharma, Shukdev Sharma, Kaushlendra Sharma and Reghvendra Sharma, utilize an integrated style of presentation based on a Fine Blend of Indian Classical and Modern Music. This includes the tradition of Ram Darbar Music's harmonies, inherited from their father, the late Pt. Shri Ramanand Ji Sharma.

Sharma Bandhu have travelled extensively in and outside India spreading the message of Universal Love through Singing The Works of Great Saint Poets Like Tulsi, Kabir, Soor, Meera and others. They have performed in United Kingdom, United States of America, South Africa, Singapore, Thailand, Mauritius, Indonesia, Nepal, and etc. In Nepal, they were guests of the Nepal Royal Family on several occasions.

Sharma Bandhu have been associated with India's Public broadcaster Doordarshan since 1975 and rank among the most popular artists on Doordarshan and telecast till date. Sharma Brothers are currently living in Ujjain.

== Albums ==
- Taruvar Ki Chhaya
- Bhajan Chalte Rahe
- Shreeram Sharanam Mama
- Mahashivratri
- Jaidev - The Composer
- Bhajan Suman
- Santo Ke Anubhav
- Sitaram Bolo Hari Ka Naam
- Amrit Dhara Raam Naam Ki
- The Magic Of Bhajans
- Mere Bhagwan Shri Ramji

== Awards ==
Sharma Bandhu were awarded Sangeet Natak Akademi Award for the year 1989 by U. P. Government, in recognition of their services in the field of Religious Music.

Sharma Bandhu are most known for the Bhajan Jaise Suraj Ki Garmi Se, penned by Indeevar with music from Jaidev for 22nd National Film Award Winning Hindi motion picture Taruvar ki chaya (Shade of tree) (1974).
