= Crossing Bridges (film) =

- Film Poster
- Directed by: Sange Dorjee Thongdok
- Written by: Sange Dorjee Thongdok
- Produced by: Sange Dorjee Thongdok; Tenzing Norbu Thongdok
- Starring: Anshu Jamsenpa; Phuntsu Khrime
- Cinematography: Pooja Gupte
- Edited by: Sanglap Bhowmick
- Music by: Anjo John
- Production company: Easel Films
- Distributed by: PVR Director's Rare
- Release dates: 27 September 2013 (MIFF); 29 August 2014 (India)
- Running time: 103 minutes
- Country: India
- Language: Shertukpen

Crossing Bridges is a 2013 Indian film directed by Sange Dorjee Thongdok. It is the first feature film ever to be made in the language of Shertukpen, which is an indigenous dialect native to the state Arunachal Pradesh in India. The film premiered on 27 September at the Mumbai International Film Festival in 2013. It received the National Film Award for Best Film in Shertukpen in 2013.

== Synopsis ==
A middle-aged man named Tashi returns to his native village in Arunachal Pradesh after losing his job. As he waits for word of any new openings in the city, the culture and history of his people begins to have a profound effect on him and force him to reconsider his life and career choices.

== Production ==
Director Sange Dorjee's idea for the film started when he was considering the social and economic displacement of tribal peoples of India. He mentioned that "My generation has had to leave home to get better higher-education and employment outside as the north eastern region doesn’t have the required infrastructure. The huge cultural difference we faced outside was always a shock to many. Coming back home has always been a difficult proposition, as after years of adjusting to the life outside we suddenly feel like an outsider in our own culture."

Due to the film's microbudget, which was wholly funded by the director's father who "believed it was important for the community of Arunachal Pradesh", Dorjee decided to shoot the movie completely with a Canon 5D camera. He was surprised by the quality of such a standard personal use camera that he and cinematographer Pooja Gupte went ahead with it.

== Critical reception ==
Crossing Bridges opened to positive acclaim amongst critics. Pooja Gupte's cinematography and the theme of 're-discovering home' were particularly praised, while the films limited appeal to mass audiences but large appeal to film enthusiasts and cinephiles were noted.

Suprateek Chatterjee of FirstPost praised the film's simplicity in its production and compared the film to Swades stating, "At a time when movies are pulling every trick in the book in an attempt to lure in audiences, Crossing Bridges relies on getting the basics right and transporting its audience to another world"

Subhash K. Jha of Odisha Sun Times gave the film a rating of three out of five saying, "It’s that supreme serenity, the splendid synthesis of ambiance and mood that qualifies and eventually absorbs our interest. These dull lives are unique in their absolute lack of affectations."

Johnson Thomas of The Free Press Journal gave a positive review and praised the cinematography stating "The cinematography by Pooja Gupte, who shot the film in Cannon 5D is simply breathtaking, allowing for a gradual cultural immurement in the land and its spiritual enchantment. The narrative is kept spare and economical by editor Sanglap Bhowmick, while the story-telling limits itself to being drawn on realism rather than melodrama. Needless to say, this film is a completely enveloping experience."

Pronoti Datta of Mumbai Boss e-magazine gave the film a rating of three out of five and stated, "The state is shown in all its picturesque glory: rolling green valleys, Buddhist monasteries, tribal dancers, phlegmatic villagers with faces weathered by the elements, fast-flowing brooks, snow-dusted trees and so on. But it’s not just pretty images. Thongdok’s quiet film in Shertukpen, a dialect spoken in the western part of Arunachal Pradesh, is about a man seduced by his own homeland, which circumstances compel him to revisit."

E-magazine India News Hub summarized the film as "an honest, return-to-roots story set against a captivating backdrop." in a positive review.

BollywoodTrade an online trade magazine was much more critical of the film, giving it a rating of 1 1/2 out of 5 mentioning how the film has a very little appeal to India's mass audience saying, "many of the short, interesting, dramatic, and visually appealing occasional glimpses are not well integrated into the main narrative. That’s why the film looks disjointed and incoherent."

Anup Pandey of e-magazine W14 gave the film a rating of 3 1/2 out of 5 saying, "For many such metaphors that the film is built on, Crossing Bridges is quite a revealing journey of a search for identity and to find answers to where does one actually belong."

Siraj Syed of FilmFestival.com gave the film a rating of three out of five saying, "If you are likely to be moved to deep emotions and tears by the idea of a Mumbai-based IT professional rediscovering his remote countryside roots in North-East India, and making the life-defining move of permanent homecoming, you will most likely feel you have a seen a minor classic."
