= Sila Nerangalil Sila Manithargal (novel) =

1970 novel by Jayakanthan

- Author: Jayakanthan
- Language: Tamil
- Genre: Romance
- Publication date: 1970
- Publication place: India

Sila Nerangalil Sila Manithargal (transl. Some people at some moments) is a Tamil-language novel by Indian writer Jayakanthan. It is an expanded version of his 1968 short story Agnipravesam (transl. Entering the fire) with a different ending. The novel, serialised in 1970 in Dinamani Kathir, won the Sahitya Akademi Award in 1972. A sequel titled Gangai Enge Pogiral (transl. Where is Ganga going?) was published in 1978. The novel was translated into Malayalam as Chila Samayangalil Chila Manushyar by C. A. Balan. It was adapted into a Tamil feature film by the same name (1977), and a Malayalam television series Chila Nerangalil Chila Manushyar (2011).

== Overview ==
Agnipravesam, a short story written by Jayakanthan, was published in the magazine Ananda Vikatan in 1968. The ending of the story, where a chaste woman purifies her daughter (by pouring a bucket of water on her) for having sex with a stranger, forgives her and asks her to move on, gained significant attention for deviating from cultural norms, and many readers suggested alternate ways to end the story in an "acceptable" manner. Responding to those suggestions, Jayakanthan expanded the short story into a full-fledged novel Sila Nerangalil Sila Manithargal with a different ending. He also took inspiration from his personal experiences.

== Accolades ==
Sila Nerangalil Sila Manithargal won the Sahitya Akademi Award in 1972.

== Sequel ==
Gangai Enge Pogiral, a sequel novel, was published in 1978. The novel revolves around Ganga being rehabilitated and becoming more responsible.

== Adaptations ==
Sila Nerangalil Sila Manithargal was adapted into a Tamil feature film by the same name in 1977, again written by Jayakanthan. In 2011, the novel was adapted into a Malayalam television series Chila Nerangalil Chila Manushyar.
