= Sinjar (film) =

- Directed by: Pampally
- Written by: Pampally
- Produced by: Shibu G Suseelan
- Starring: Srinda Arhaan; Mythili; Musthafa; Yassar; Sethulakshmi
- Cinematography: Sanjay Harris
- Edited by: Lijo Paul
- Music by: Satheesh Ramachandran
- Release date: 2018
- Country: India
- Language: Jasari

Sinjar is a 2018 Indian Jasari language film written and directed by Pampally. Sinjar was one of the first movies to be made in Jasari, as the director did an attempt to revive the language.

The movie won the Best Feature Film in Jasari and the Indira Gandhi Award for Best Debut Film of a Director at the 65th National Film Awards, which were declared at New Delhi on 13 April 2018.

== Plot ==
Ansar, the protagonist, his sister Suhara, and Ansar's fiancée Fida. According to their customs, Ansar did not bring Fida home until after the wedding. Suhara and Fida are later kidnapped by ISIS terrorists while working abroad. The Ministry of External Affairs eventually rescues them and brings them back to Lakshadweep, along with several other women who had also been working overseas.

It is later revealed through the media that the rescued women were subjected to brutal sexual violence by the ISIS terrorists. This news shakes Ansar, who begins to doubt Fida's past and whether she too was a victim of such atrocities. When he confronts Fida, she falls unconscious and later reveals that she is pregnant. Ansar, overwhelmed by the situation, decides to end their engagement.

The film also explores the issue of sexual violence against women, as Suhara reveals that she too was a victim of similar abuse. Meanwhile, Fida decides to raise her child as a pious Muslim.

The film addresses sensitive topics related to sexual violence, cultural customs, and the challenges faced by women in certain situations. The storytelling approach is intended to be informative and thought-provoking, while also maintaining a neutral and objective tone.

== Cast ==
- Musthafa as Ansar
- Srinda Arhaan as Fida
- Mythili as Suhara
- Binoy Nambala as Haris
- Sethulekshmi Amma as Umma
- Munshi Dileep as Hansa
- Kottayam Padman as Ahemed Haji
- Durga as Umma
- Yassar as Subair
- Rishin Sali as Agent
- Lakshmi S. as Fathimathatha
- Sumaya as Sunaina
- Siyana as Daughter
- P.I.Kunjikoya as Advocate
- Sajad Bright as Asees
- Bamban Kattupuram as Thangal
- Fakrudheen as Mukri
- Noor Varnalayam as Koya
- Gayathri as Lady Doctor
- Awri Rahman as Ward Member
