= Chameli Memsaab =

1975 film

- Directed by: Abdul Majid
- Story by: Nirode Choudhury
- Produced by: Seuj Bolchhabi Santha
- Starring: George Baker; Binita Borgohain
- Music by: Bhupen Hazarika
- Release date: 1975
- Running time: 144 min
- Country: India
- Language: Assamese

Chameli Memsaab (English: Madame Chameli) is a 1975 Indian Assamese romantic drama film directed by Abdul Majid. A love story set in a tea estate in Assam, between a British tea estate owner and local tea garden worker. It starred George Baker and Binita Borgohain as leads. The film is based on a short story by journalist and writer, Nirode Choudhury.

The film was both a critical and commercial success, lead actor Baker turned into a matinee idol. At the 1975 National Film Awards, the film won the award for Best Music Direction for Bhupen Hazarika, as well as Best Feature Film in Assamese. In 2013, at the 44th International Film Festival of India, in Goa the film was shown as a part of "Focus: North East" section.

== Plot ==
The film is set in a tea garden in Assam, where Berkeley (George Baker) is a British owner, he falls in love with Chameli (Binita Borgohain), is local girl who works in the tea estate. Subsequently, they marry, however later he is blamed of her suicide.

== Cast ==
- George Baker as Berkeley
- Binita Borgohain as Chameli
- Abdul Majid as Monglu
- Anil Chatterjee
- Tarun Kumar

== Soundtrack ==
Music of the film was given by Dr. Bhupen Hazarika.

Title
No.	Title	Lyrics	Singer(s)	Length
1.	"Asom Deshor Bagisare"	Bhupen Hazarika	Usha Mangeshkar, Bhupen Hazarika
2.	"Hawa Nai Batash Nai"	Bhupen Hazarika	Usha Mangeshkar
3.	"Jigija Gijao"	Bhupen Hazarika	Bhupen Hazarika, Usha Mangeshkar
4.	"Hyre Praner Basa Mor"	Bhupen Hazarika	Usha Mangeshkar
5.	"O Bideshi Bandhu"	Bhupen Hazarika	Bhupen Hazarika

== Remake ==
This film was remade in Bangla and Hindi languages. The Bangla edition 'Chameli Memsaheb', directed by Indar Sen was released in 1978. The two main roles of this film were played by George Bekar and Rakhee Gulzar. In other hand, the Hindi 'Chameli Memsaab', directed by Ajit Lahiri was released in 1981. The main roles were played by Mithun Chakraborty and Abha dhulia.
