= Kantilal Rathod =

Indian film maker

Kantilal Rathod (12 December 1924 – 28 September 1988) was an Indian film maker, animator and painter chiefly known for his work in Gujarati and Hindi cinema. He directed the 1969 Gujarati film Kanku which won National Film Award for Best Feature Film in Gujarati at the 17th National Film Awards.

== Biography ==
Born on 12 December 1924 in Raipur, India, His father Morarji Rathod belonged to KGK community of Kutch hailing from village Khedoi Rathod later grew up in Bengali atmosphere. He studied Art at Shantiniketan, also studied art at Calcutta School of Art in Calcutta to get Bachelor of Fine Arts and went to America to study Animation and Cartoon film at Art Institute of Chicago. He taught documentary film making and editing at Circus University, America during 1954-56. He made a short film Cloven Horizon about children's paintings for the same institute. The film was distributed by Encyclopædia Britannica. He briefly worked with Scottish Canadians animator and director Norman McLaren. At Bombay he founded one of the first animation studio by the name "Aakar" in 1960. He died on 28 September 1988 at Bombay.

== Filmography ==
- Anjam (1940)
- Mr. and Mrs. Peacock (1956)
- Buddhu Aur DCM (1959) (Documentary)
- Withering Flowers (1960) (Short film)
- Cloven Horizon (1965) (Documentary)
- Adventures of a Sugar Doll (1965)
- The Parts That Build the Auto (1966) (Documentary)
- Peace-Time Armada (1967) (Short film)
- Pinjra (1968) (Short film)
- Kanku (1969)
- Strife to Stability (1969) (Documentary)
- Freedom Freedom (1971) (Documentary)
- Tested Berries (1973) (Short film)
- Short Cut (1973) (Short film)
- Parinay (1974) aka Espousal (1974)
- Sardar Vallabhai Patel (1976) (Documentary)
- Zangbo and the Zing Zing Bar (1977)
- Ramnagari (1982)
- The Choice Is Yours (1982) (Documentary)
- Doongar Ro Bhed (1985)
- Save Energy Through Efficient Motors (1989) (Documentary)

== Accolades ==
His film Parinay won the 1974 Nargis Dutt Award for Best Feature Film on National Integration (known as the "Rajat Kamal Special Award for the Best Feature Film on National Integration" at that time) presented by the Directorate of Film Festivals (DFF). The DFF also gave Samantar Chitra Private Limited a Rajat Kamal (Silver Lotus), ₹30,000 (equivalent to ₹900,000 or US$9,300 in 2023), and a certificate; Rathod got a Rajat Kamal, ₹10,000 (equivalent to ₹300,000 or US$3,100 in 2023), and a certificate. Rathod's film Cloven Horizon won the best documentary film in 1965. The same year he won the National Film Award for Best Children's Film for The Adventures of Sugar Doll at 13th National Film Awards.
