= Jagat Murari =

Indian documentary filmmaker

Jagat Murari जगत मुरारी
- Born: 5 October 1924; Patna
- Died: 13 April 2007 (aged 82); Pune, Maharashtra
- Citizenship: Indian
- Education: Masters in Physics, Masters in Cinema
- Alma mater: University of Southern California
- Occupations: Film maker, Director, Educationist
- Years active: 1948-2007
- Known for: Film & Television Institute of India (FTII). First winner of President’s Gold Medal for a documentary film.
- Notable work: Film Mahabalipuram
- Spouse: Lakshmi Murari
- Children: 4
- Awards: President’s Gold Medal

Jagat Murari (5 October 1924 – 13 April 2007) was a distinguished Indian documentary filmmaker, known well for his contributions to Indian cinema as a producer, director, educator. He played a pioneering role in a number of key film institutions in India, including the Film & Television Institute of India (FTII), the National Film Archive of India (NFAI), and the Directorate of Film Festivals (DFF). Murari is well remembered for nurturing young, talented students as head of FTII, Pune between 1962 and 1971, many of whom are now well known names in the Bollywood industry, including Jaya Bhaduri, Shabana Azmi, Adoor Gopalakrishnan and Subhash Ghai.

== Life and career ==
=== Filmmaker ===
Murari earned a master's degree in Physics at Patna University and then, feeling that his background in physics would be useful in cinema, he obtained a master's degree in Cinema in 1947 from the University of Southern California, Los Angeles. His first Hollywood internship was on Orson Welles' film, Macbeth. He returned to India early the next year and joined the Films Division as a deputy director just a few months after its creation. He then become a director, and then assistant producer.

Many of his films won national and international awards and were screened at some of the world's most prestigious film festivals (see Selected filmography below). His landmark film Mahabalipuram was shown at the International Film Festival in Berlin and at the Second International Art Film Festival in New York in 1952. In 1953, it went to the Edinburgh Film Festival. Mahabalipuram and Cave Temples of India – 1 (Buddhist), were shown in China in 1955 for a Festival of Indian Films, which was considered an important step in bringing the people of India and China closer together in friendship. By the time he left the Films Division in 1961, he had written and directed 37 films. Between 1959 and 1961, he produced 43 films.

=== Educator ===
Murari joined the Film and Television Institute of India (FTII) in Pune soon after its creation in 1961 and worked there until 1971. Initially, he was the Professor of Direction, but after Gajanand Jagirdar resigned as Principal in 1961, he took on the role. In the 1960s, the FTII trained actors, directors, cinematographers, and sound technicians, including Jaya Bhaduri, Shatrughan Sinha, Rehana Sultan, Adoor Gopalakrishnan, Mani Kaul, Subhash Ghai, and K. K. Mahajan. As an educator, he filled India's prolific but chaotic film industry with a greater degree of professionalism and skill by introducing a stream of highly trained directors, technicians, and actors.

Murari taught courses in documentary filmmaking and film direction, among other subjects as teaching Principal. He was very popular for his polite, kind-hearted nature and his dedication to his students. According to Subhash Ghai, he was "a thorough gentleman who cared for his students" and constantly strove to "reinvent teaching methods in filmmaking at FTII."

In 1962, the government asked Murari to start the National Film Archives of India (NFAI) in Pune, because the Film Institute needed a good film collection for educational purposes. Murari established the vision for this new organization, shaped its objectives, and secured its funding. Initially a subset of the Film Institute, the Archives formally opened in 1964, with a small office in the Film Institute. It used the institute's film vaults and hosted screenings in its theaters. He ran the Archives until 1967.

In 1972, he returned to the Films Division, where he produced more films. His film Homi Bhabha - A Scientist in Action won the National Film Award in the Experimental Category in 1973. Another film from this period, Lost Child, based on the story by the well-known Indian writer Mulk Raj Anand, also won recognition.

In 1973, he established the Film Festival Directorate, where he hosted international film festivals as well as the National Film Awards program. He went back to the Film Institute in 1976 and retired three years later. After that, he returned to documentary filmmaking, working as a producer, director and scriptwriter. He made 10 films in those years, some for the Films Division, some for other organisations. He was still behind the camera at the age of 70. He continued to be involved in the film field as an advisor until shortly before his death.

== Death ==
Murari died on 13 April 2007 at the age of 85 after battling cancer. He is survived by his wife Lakshmi Murari, three sons, Ashok, Anoop and Vivek, and a daughter, Radha Chadha.

== Selected filmography ==
Year	Film	Role	Award	Organization
1951	Story of Steel	Director & Script	1951: Certificate of Merit at Second International Festival of Scientific & Documentary Films, Venice, Italy 1952: Official Selection for In Competition Short Films at Cannes Festival	Films Division
1952	Mahabalipuram	Director & Script	1954: President's gold medal for the Best Documentary Film at the 1st National Film Award, India 1952: Diploma of participation at International Film Festival, Berlin 1952: Selected for showing at Second International Art Film Festival in New York 1953: Selected for Edinburgh Film Festival 1955: Shown at Festival Of Indian Films in China	Films Division
1953	Our Original Inhabitants	Director & Script	1953: Diploma of participation, International Film Festival, Venice	Films Division
1955	National Library	Director & Script	1956: Diploma of participation at International film Festival, Berlin	Films Division
1955	Wonder of Work	Director & Script	1955: Certificate of Merit, National Film Awards 1957: First Prize at International Congress on Occupation Health in Helsinki 1957: High Commendation Certificate at the Seventh World Congress of the International Society for the Welfare of Cripples at London	Films Division
1956	Bharata Natyam	Director & Script	1956: Diploma of participation at International film Festival, Berlin 1956: Selected for exhibition, International Film Festival, Edinburgh	Films Division
1956	Madurai of the Naiks	Director & Script	1958: Diploma of participation at International Film Festival, Bergamo	Films Division
1956	A Holiday in South India	Director & Script	1960: Diploma of Honour, International Film Festival in Locarno, Switzerland	Films Division
1957	Jhelum	Director & Script	1958: Diploma of participation, International Film Festival, Cork, Ireland 1958: Selected for exhibition, International Film Festival, Edinburgh, UK	Films Division
1958	Story of Energy	Director & Script	1966: Gran Premio Cup and Diploma of Merit at XIII International Electronic, Nuclear and Teleradio Cinematographic Review, Rome	Films Division
1960	Half of Mankind	Director	1965: Shown at Third International Film Festival of India, New Delhi	UN
1964	One Day	Producer	1965: Golden Gate Award at San Francisco International Film Festival 1965: All India Certificate of Merit in documentary category of National Film Awards 1965: Certificate of participation at Edinburgh Festival 1965: Selected for Exhibition in Sydney Festival	FTII
1969	The Awakener a film on Meher Baba	Producer	1969: Certificate of participation, 4th International Film Festival of India, New Delhi	Films Division
1973	Homi Bhabha - A Scientist in Action	Producer	1973: National Film Award, Experimental Category 1974: Diploma of participation, International Scientific Film Festival, Rio de Janeiro, Brazil	Films Division
1974	Lost Child	Producer	1977: Diploma of participation, XVth International Cinema Contest for children & teenagers, Gijon, Spain, 1977	Films Division
1980	Conquest of Cancer	Producer & Director & Script	1980: Diploma of participation, XVIIIInternational Festival of Films on Scientific and Technical Progress, TECHFILM80, Pardubice, Czechoslovakia 1981: Certificate of participation, 8th International Film Festival of India, New Delhi	Jagat Murari Productions for Films Division
1982	Jewel of Manipur (Part 1)	Producer & Director & Script	1990: Certificate of Participation in the First Bombay International Film Festival for Documentary & Short Films, India	Jagat Murari Productions for Films Division

== Awards ==
He won the first President's Gold Medal in 1954 for his 1952 documentary film Mahabalipuram. He also won several other national awards and international acclaim at festivals in Berlin, Venice, Edinburgh, San Francisco and Cannes.
