= Dominic Sangma =

Indian filmmaker

- Education: Satyajit Ray Film & Television Institute
- Years active: 2015 to present
- Notable work: Ma.Ama, Rapture

Dominic Sangma is a filmmaker based in the Northeastern Indian state Meghalaya. He made the films Ma.Ama and Rapture. Ma.Ama won the Best Film Award in Garo language in the 66th National Film Awards. His feature film Rapture won many awards at film festivals and awards, held in India and abroad. Known for his work that deeply reflects the culture, history, and folklore of his region, Sangma's films often explore themes of identity, spirituality, and the human experience, particularly through the lens of his Garo community.

== Career ==
A graduate of the Satyajit Ray Film and Television Institute in Kolkata, Sangma's career began with a focus on documentary filmmaking, but he quickly transitioned into fiction films that capture the essence of his heritage. His debut feature film, Ma'ama (2018), received international recognition for its portrayal of loss and the quest for understanding the afterlife. The film was screened at multiple film festivals and won several awards, establishing Sangma as a significant voice in Indian independent cinema.

Sangma's storytelling style combines poetic visuals, minimalistic dialogues, and a focus on natural soundscapes, drawing inspiration from the slow cinema movement. His work is often marked by an intimate connection with nature and the spiritual elements of Garo traditions, creating a cinematic experience that is both immersive and contemplative.

He continues to work on projects that highlight the rich, diverse culture of Meghalaya and has become a prominent figure in promoting and representing Northeastern Indian cinema on global platforms.

== Collaboration with China and other global partners ==
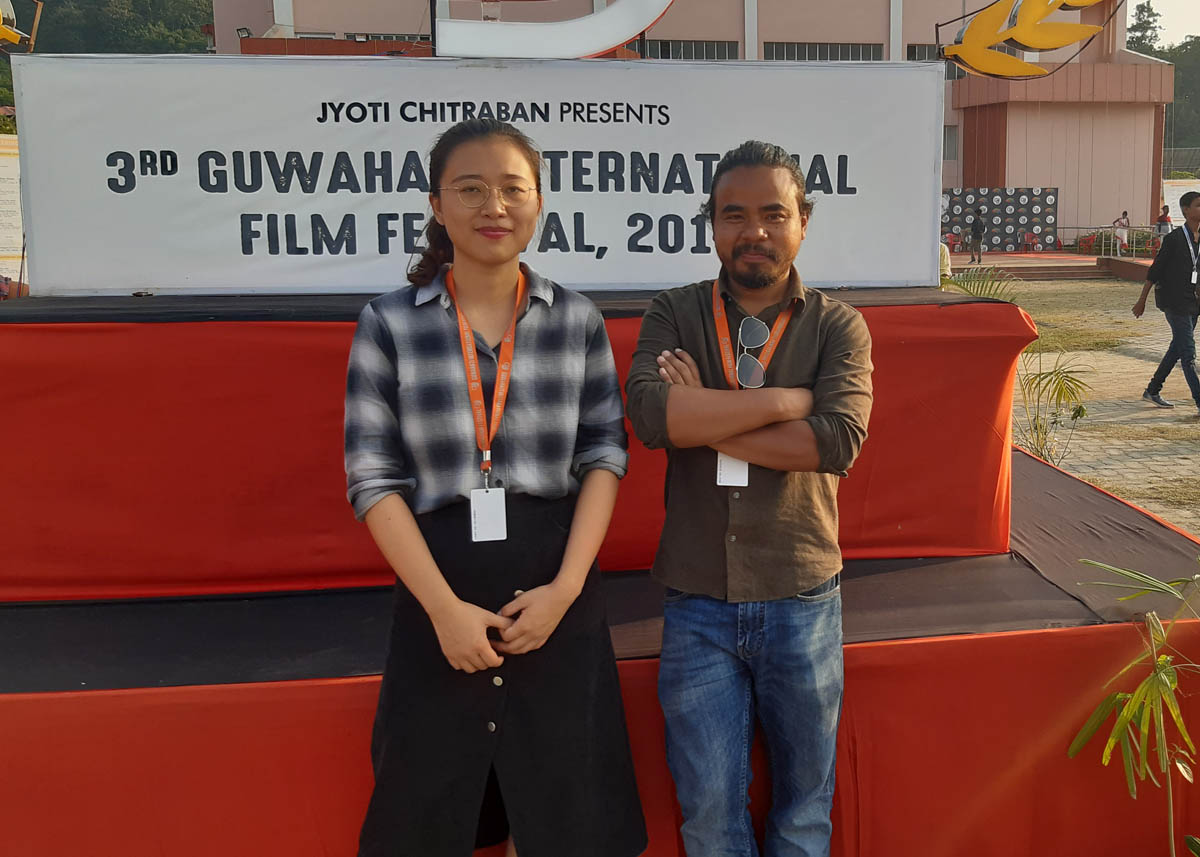
Dominic Sangma with Chinese producer Xu Jianshang at Guwahati International Film Festival in Guwahati. Photo by: Abdul Gani

Dominic Sangma's journey into international collaboration began with his diploma film, Rong'kuchak (Echoes), which was showcased at the student film festival at the Beijing Film Academy. It was there that Chinese producer Xu Jianshang, who was also studying at the academy, discovered Sangma's work and was instantly drawn to his storytelling style. This initial connection laid the foundation for a unique collaboration, leading Jianshang and Sangma to co-produce his debut feature film, Ma.Ama. Their partnership continued with their second film, Rapture, which delves into the realm of magic realism, marking a shift from the personal to the imaginative in Sangma’s storytelling.

Rapture received support from international film funds, including Hubert Bals, Visions Sud Est, and the Doha Film Institute. The film is produced by Sangma's Anna Films in collaboration with Xu Jianshang and Sun Li from China, along with Indian producers Anu Rangachar, Harsh Agarwal, Aditya Grover, and Stephen Zacharias. Additionally, Eva Gunme R. Marak, a patron of Northeast Indian arts based in Meghalaya, played a significant role in the project. This diverse production team highlights Sangma's commitment to fostering cross-cultural collaborations while bringing Northeast Indian narratives to a global audience.

== Release in France ==
Sangma's 'Rapture' was released in over 100 theatres across France in May 2024. The release was announced by Capricci Cinema in collaboration with Anna Films Shillong. The film explores the deep cultural and spiritual realms of the Garo community, captivating audiences worldwide and highlighting the rich heritage and traditions of Northeast India on an international platform.
