= Sila Nerangalil Sila Manithargal (1977 film) =

- Poster
- Directed by: A. Bhimsingh
- Written by: Jayakanthan
- Based on: Sila Nerangalil Sila Manithargal by Jayakanthan
- Produced by: B. Hrudayanath
- Starring: Lakshmi; Srikanth
- Cinematography: G. Vittal Rao
- Edited by: A. Paul Duraisingam
- Music by: M. S. Viswanathan
- Production company: A. B. S. Productions
- Release date: 1 April 1977
- Running time: 130 minutes
- Country: India
- Language: Tamil

Sila Nerangalil Sila Manithargal (transl. Some people at some moments) is a 1977 Indian Tamil-language romantic drama film directed by A. Bhimsingh and written by Jayakanthan. Based on Jayakanthan's novel of the same name, it stars Lakshmi and Srikanth, with C. K. Nagesh, Y. G. Parthasarathy, R. Neelakantan, Sukumari and S. Sundari Bai in supporting roles. The film revolves around a girl from an orthodox family whose life changes after a sexual assault.

Sila Nerangalil Sila Manithargal was released on 1 April 1977 and became a commercial success. Lakshmi won the National Film Award for Best Actress in a Leading Role, the film's only win at the 24th National Film Awards.

== Plot ==
On a rainy night, Ganga, a college girl from an orthodox Tamil Brahmin family in Srirangam, is sexually assaulted by a stranger after he offers her a ride in his car. She returns home dazed from the experience and when asked by her mother Kanagam about what happened, she confesses. Kanagam creates a ruckus; all the neighbours and relatives learn of it.

Ganga's brother, the family's breadwinner, disowns and evicts her from the house. At the request of Kanagam, Ganga's maternal uncle Vengu takes her with him to Madras, and Ganga continues her education there. After graduating, she gets employed in a private firm and grows to take the top managerial position. Exploiting her blemished status, Vengu, who was once her guardian, makes sexual advances towards her several times, forcing Ganga to make Kanagam stay with her to keep herself protected from Vengu.

R. K. Viswanatha Sarma, a writer who witnessed Ganga entering the car on that rainy night, writes a story in a magazine in which the lead character, a girl, is molested by a stranger; after she returns home, her mother conceals the truth, cleanses her through a bath and the girl is able to live normally. Ganga reads the story and recommends it to Kanagam, which makes her feel guilty about the ruckus she had created.

Ganga, though successful at her workplace, remains withdrawn and aloof in life. When she rejects Vengu's advances, he challenges her to locate the stranger who had sex with her and live with him if she has the guts. Accepting the challenge, she takes Viswanatha Sarma's help, and locates Prabhakar alias Prabhu who offered her a ride on that rainy night. Prabhu is already married and has an adolescent daughter. He does not initially recognise Ganga. When he is made to recollect the experience, he feels upset. Prabhu says he thought she was a consenting partner and did not realise he was imposing himself.

Ganga and Prabhu's subsequent meetings result in friendship which then matures into love. The new relationship is, however, unacceptable to both families. Unable to transcend the society's norms, Prabhu advises Ganga to marry someone else. When all attempts to convince Prabhu fail, choosing to live with her memories, Ganga parts ways with him.

== Cast ==
- Lakshmi as Ganga
- Srikanth as Prabhakar
- C. K. Nagesh as R. K. Viswanatha Sarma
- Y. G. Parthasarathy as Vengu Mama
- R. Neelakantan as Ganesan
- Sukumari as "Anni" (Ganesan's wife)
- S. Sundari Bai as Kanagam
- Rajasulochana as Padma
- Jayageetha as Manju
- Bhuvanadevi as Immanuel

== Production ==
Sila Nerangalil Sila Manithargal is based on the novel of the same name, by Jayakanthan which was a detailed version of his short story Agnipravesam. Jayakanthan wrote the screenplay for the film adaptation, which was in development as early as 1975, with C. V. Rajendran initially attached to direct. A. Bhimsingh later took over direction. R. Muthuraman and J. Jayalalithaa initially gave their dates to act in the film, but Jayakanthan wanted Lakshmi and Srikanth. Jayakanthan felt only Lakshmi exhibited the innocence required for the character. According to historian G. Dhananjayan, since the film took considerable time to complete, Lakshmi did not cooperate during the time and she did not dub entirely for the film; another actress who appeared in the film had dubbed for her instead.

== Soundtrack ==
The soundtrack was composed by M. S. Viswanathan. There are only two songs in the film: "Veru Idam Thedi" and "Kandathai Sollugiren Ungal".

Track listing
No.	Title	Lyrics	Singer(s)	Length
1.	"Kandathai Sollugiren Ungal"	Jayakanthan	M. S. Viswanathan	3:17
2.	"Veru Idam Thedi"	Jayakanthan	Vani Jairam	3:16
Total length:				6:33

== Release and reception ==
Sila Nerangalil Sila Manithargal was initially scheduled to release on December 1976, but eventually released on 1 April 1977. In a review dated 17 April 1977, Ananda Vikatan was positive towards the film, particularly Lakshmi's performance. The critic also called the film an example of adapting a novel beautifully without changing its essence. Kanthan of Kalki lauded the faithfulness to the novel, Lakshmi's performance, the relatively less use of dialogues compared to other Tamil films, the absence of unnecessary sets, Vittal Rao's cinematography and Jayakanthan's dialogues. The film became a commercial success, running for over 100 days in theatres. At the 24th National Film Awards, Lakshmi won the National Film Award for Best Actress in a Leading Role, the film's only win at the ceremony.

== Legacy ==
G. Dhananjayan considered Sila Nerangalil Sila Manithargal an important film in Tamil cinema for being "a searing criticism at the way marriage, sex and women were treated by society". The film, has, however been frequently criticised by another historian S. Theodore Baskaran for relying heavily on dialogues over visuals, including the characters reciting every dialogue in the novel verbatim. He accused the film of perpetuating this flaw of Tamil cinema.

== Bibliography ==
- Baskaran, S. Theodore (1996). The Eye of the Serpent: An Introduction to Tamil Cinema. Chennai: East West Books. OCLC 243920437.
- Dhananjayan, G. (2014). Pride of Tamil Cinema: 1931–2013. Blue Ocean Publishers. OCLC 898765509.
- Rajadhyaksha, Ashish; Willemen, Paul (1998) [1994]. Encyclopaedia of Indian Cinema. British Film Institute and Oxford University Press. ISBN 0-19-563579-5.
