= Lalan Sarang =

Indian producer and actress (1938–2018)

- Born: 26 December 1938; Goa, India
- Died: 9 November 2018 (aged 79); Pune, India
- Occupation(s): Actress, Producer
- Spouse: Kamlakar Sarang (m. 1964)

Lalan Sarang (26 December 1938 – 9 November 2018) was an Indian film, theatre and television producer and actress in Marathi, Hindi, and Gujarati productions. She produced several plays. Sarang played important roles in many plays and films.

== Awards ==
- In 2011, she was selected for the 'Grahini Sachiv Award' of GaDiMa Pratishthan.
- Pimpri Chinchwad Kalarang Sanskrutik Sanstha – Kalagaurav award
- president of the 87th Marathi Natya Sammelan at Kankavli.
- Jivan gaurav award 2017 अखिल भारतीय मराठी नाट्यपरिषदेच्या कोथरूड शाखेतर्फे जीवनगौरव पुरस्कार (२४ जानेवारी, २०१७)

== Personal life ==
Born in Goa as Lalan Paingankar, she had no family background in acting. She completed her schooling in Rammohan school in Mumbai. She completed her college in Siddharth college while doing service at Mumbai Kamgar Aayukt Karyalay.

Sarang's husband was Kamlakar Sarang, an actor and a theater director. He directed the controversial Vijay Tendulkar play Sakharam Binder, in which Lalan Sarang played the role of Champa. Sarang's son is Rakesh Sarang.

She was a culinary expert and ran a seafood restaurant Masemari on Tilak Road in Pune.

Sarang died on 9 November 2018 at Joshi Hospital in Pune.

== Filmography ==
=== Film ===
- Samna (1975) with Shriram Lagoo, Nilu Phule and others
- Mahek (2007) with Shreya Sharma, Madan Deodhar, Anuya Bhagwat, Anuja Borkar and Dhiresh Joshi
- Ha Khel Sawalyancha (1976)

=== Theatre ===
- Asha ya Doghi with Reema Lagoo
- Aakrosh आक्रोश (वनिता)
- Aarop आरोप (मोहिनी)
- Udyacha Sansar उद्याचा संसार
- Umbarthyavar maap thevle उंबरठ्यावर माप ठेविले
- Kamla कमला (सरिता)
- Kalchakra कालचक्र (दिग्दर्शन आणि अभिनय)
- Khol khol pani खोल खोल पाणी (चंद्राक्का)
- Gidhade गिधाडे (माणिक)
- Gharkul घरकुल
- Gharte amuche chan घरटे अमुचे छान (विमल)
- Chamakla Dhruvacha Tara चमकला ध्रुवाचा तारा
- Jangli Kabutar जंगली कबुतर (गुल)
- Jodidar जोडीदार (शरयू)
- To mi navhech तो मी नव्हेच
- Dhandevaik धंदेवाईक (चंदा)
- Bibi Kari Salam बिबी करी सलाम
- Baby बेबी (अचला)
- Mi Mantri Zalo मी मंत्री झालो
- Rathchakra रथचक्र ( ती)
- Ranicha Baag राणीचा बाग
- Lagnachi Bedi लग्नाची बेडी
- Sakharam Binder सखाराम बाइंडर (चंपा)
- Sambhushanchya Chalit संभूसांच्या चाळीत
- Sahaj Jinki Mana सहज जिंकी मना (मुक्ता)
- Suryast सूर्यास्त (जनाई)
- Steel Frame स्टील फ्रेम (हिंदी)

=== Television ===
- Rathchakra रथचक्र

== Books ==
She has written many books.

- Natakamagil Natya नाटकांमागील नाटय़ – (The drama behind the play) A book of memoirs of the incidents and experiences she went through during her days on stage.
- Mi ani mazya bhumika मी आणि माझ्या भूमिका
- Jagle jashi जगले जशी
- Bahardar kisse ani chatakdar pakkruti बहारदार किस्से आणि चटकदार पाककृती
