= 49th National Film Awards =

2001 film awards in India

- Awarded for: Best of Indian cinema in 2001
- Awarded by: Directorate of Film Festivals
- Presented by: A. P. J. Abdul Kalam (President of India)
- Announced on: 26 July 2002
- Presented on: 13 February 2003
- Official website: dff.nic.in

Highlights
- Best Feature Film: Dweepa
- Best Non-Feature Film: Sonal
- Best Book: • Asoumiya Chalachitrar Chaa-Pohar • Moulik Marathi Chitrageete
- Best Film Critic: Vinod Anupam
- Dadasaheb Phalke Award: Yash Chopra
- Most awards: Lagaan (8)

The 49th National Film Awards, presented by Directorate of Film Festivals, the organisation set up by Ministry of Information and Broadcasting, India to felicitate the best of Indian Cinema released in the year 2001. Awards were announced by the committee headed by K. S. Sethumadhavan, K. K. Kapil and Bharat Gopy for the feature films, non-feature films and books written on Indian cinema, respectively, on 26 July 2002; whereas award ceremony took place on 13 February 2003 and awards were given away by then President of India, A. P. J. Abdul Kalam.

== Awards ==
Awards were divided into feature films, non-feature films and books written on Indian cinema.

=== Lifetime Achievement Award ===
Name of Award	Image	Awardee(s)	Awarded As	Awards
Dadasaheb Phalke Award		Yash Chopra	director and producer	Swarna Kamal, ₹ 100,000 and a Shawl

=== Feature films ===
Feature films were awarded at All India as well as regional level. For 49th National Film Awards, a Kannada film, Dweepa won the National Film Award for Best Feature Film; whereas a Hindi film, Lagaan won the maximum number of awards (8). Following were the awards given in each category:

==== Juries ====
A committee headed by K. S. Sethumadhavan was appointed to evaluate the feature films awards. Following were the jury members:

- Jury Members
  - K. S. Sethumadhavan (Chairperson) • S. Ali Raza • Arun Kaul • Aruna Harprasad • Chitra Lakshmanan • Chitra Mudgal • Hemen Das
  - J. L. Ralhan • K. C. N. Chandrasekar • Ibohal Sharma • K. Sampath • K. S. Rama Rao • Meera Dewan • Nabyendu Chatterjee
  - Pallavi Joshi • Pradip Biswas • Prakash Dubey • Rajeevnath • Ramesh Desai • Sanjay Surkar • Sanjeev Hazarika

==== All India Award ====
Following were the awards given:

===== Golden Lotus Award =====
Official name: Swarna Kamal

All the awardees are awarded with 'Golden Lotus Award (Swarna Kamal)', a certificate and cash prize.

Name of Award	Name of Film	Language	Awardee(s)	Cash prize
Best Feature Film	Dweepa	Kannada	Producer: Soundarya director: Girish Kasaravalli	₹ 50,000/- Each
Best Feature Film	Citation: For the film combines integrity, creativity and aesthetics in its depiction of both the dilemmas and the spirit of a family who defy logic and weather to hold on to their roots.			
Best Debut Film of a Director	Thiladaanam	Telugu	Producer: NFDC; Director: K. N. T. Sastry	₹ 25,000/- Each
Best Debut Film of a Director	Citation: For its juxtaposition of two diverse ideologies existing within the same family – the father's belief in his religion and traditions and his son's revolutionary ideology. The film strikes a very fine balance in inter-generational explorations.			
Best Popular Film Providing Wholesome Entertainment	Lagaan	Hindi	Producer: Aamir Khan; Director: Ashutosh Gowariker	₹ 40,000/- Each
Best Popular Film Providing Wholesome Entertainment	Citation: For showing the victory of the human spirit in the face of oppression and for the creative use of a Cricket game as a metaphor for both colonisation and nationalism.			
Best Direction	Ooruku Nooruper	Tamil	B. Lenin	₹ 50,000/-
Best Direction	Citation: For telling the eventful story of a revolutionary who has killed for his cause and awarded the death sentence for his crime. It further looks at the issue of capital punishment.			

===== Silver Lotus Award =====
Official name: Rajat Kamal

All the awardees are awarded with 'Silver Lotus Award (Rajat Kamal)', a certificate and cash prize.

Name of Award	Name of Film	Language	Awardee(s)	Cash prize
Best Feature Film on National Integration	Bub	Kashmiri	Producer: NFDC; Director: Jyoti Sarup	₹ 30,000/- Each
Best Feature Film on National Integration	Citation: For exploring the problems of a minority in the face of terrorist activities of forces across the border. Against this macro scenario, the film weaves together more intimate micro stories particularly of the bonding between a sensitive bureaucrat and an orphaned boy.			
Best Film on Other Social Issues	Chandni Bar	Hindi	Producer: Lata Mohan Iyer; Director: Madhur Bhandarkar	₹ 30,000/- Each
Best Film on Other Social Issues	Citation: For its realistic portrayal of the problems of an uprooted woman who is brought to Mumbai and forced to work in a beer bar. The film is a poignant and sensitive depiction of innocent girls trapped in the vicious cycle of survival in the underworld.			
Best Actor	Neythukaran	Malayalam	Murali	₹ 10,000/-
Best Actor	Citation: For his brilliant portrayal of a character called Mestry, a committed political worker, caught in a web of shifting values-political and social.			
Best Actress	Chandni Bar	Hindi	Tabu	₹ 10,000/- Each
Best Actress	Citation: For her down to earth and sensitive depiction of a never say die women, uprooted by the scars of communal violence.			₹ 10,000/- Each
Best Actress	Mitr, My Friend	English	Shobana	₹ 10,000/- Each
Best Actress	Citation: For her lifelike performance of a lonely mother / housewife torn between the social values of different societies which reflects the mood of the film.			₹ 10,000/- Each
Best Supporting Actor	Chandni Bar	Hindi	Atul Kulkarni	₹ 10,000/-
Best Supporting Actor	Citation: For depicting a ruthless character, trapped in a world without social values.			
Best Supporting Actress	Chandni Bar	Hindi	Ananya Khare	₹ 10,000/-
Best Supporting Actress	Citation: For her humane and realistic performance of a complex character.			
Best Child Artist	Kutty	Tamil	P. Shwetha	₹ 10,000/-
Best Child Artist	Citation: For her subdued portrayal of Kutty, a young girl made to suffer the agonies of social disparity and human exploitation.			
Best Male Playback Singer	• Lagaan ("Mitwa") • Dil Chahta Hain ("Jaane Kyon")	Hindi	Udit Narayan	₹ 10,000/-
Best Male Playback Singer	Citation: For the song "Mitwa" in Hindi film "Lagaan" and "Jaane Kyon Log Pyaar Karte Hain" in Hindi film "Dil Chahta Hai".			
Best Female Playback Singer	Udayageethavin Azhagi ("Pattu Cholli")	Tamil	Sadhana Sargam	₹ 10,000/-
Best Female Playback Singer	Citation: For her lilting and touching rendering of the song.			
Best Cinematography	Dweepa	Kannada	Cameraman: Ramachandra Halkere; Laboratory Processing: Prasad Film Laboratory	₹ 10,000/- Each
Best Cinematography	Citation: For his excellent camerawork that captures the agrarian milieu with strong visual metaphors. His work stands out for its deft handling of the situation, social vignettes and characters.			
Best Screenplay	Show	Telugu	G. Neelakanta Reddy	₹ 10,000/-
Best Screenplay	Citation: For the film, which seems to probes a real – unreal dramatic situation involving two characters full of emotion and conflicts, with a rare touch of artistic sensitivity.			
Best Audiography	Lagaan	Hindi	• H. Sridhar • Nakul Kamte	₹ 10,000/-
Best Audiography	Citation: For The sound effects recorded both efficiently and imaginatively heighten the visual impact of the film.			
Best Editing	Mitr, My Friend	English	Beena Paul	₹ 10,000/-
Best Editing	Citation: For her crisp and taut cutting, makes her bag this award. The excellence is on view in frames offering imaginative touch.			
Best Art Direction	Lagaan	Hindi	Nitin Chandrakant Desai	₹ 10,000/-
Best Art Direction	Citation: For aesthetically recreating the pre independence period village with authentic details.			
Best Costume Design	Lagaan	Hindi	Bhanu Athaiya	₹ 10,000/-
Best Costume Design	Citation: For taking microscopic care in designing the costumes of pre independence era which gives the film an authentic look.			
Best Music Direction	Lagaan	Hindi	Songs and Background Score: A. R. Rahman	₹ 10,000/-
Best Music Direction	Citation: For a music score, that is both regional in character and popular in appeal bringing out the ethos of Saurashtra region.			
Best Lyrics	Lagaan ("Radha Kaise Na Jale" and "Ghanan Ghanan")	Hindi	Javed Akhtar	₹ 10,000/-
Best Lyrics	Citation: For using very simple language to bring out the richness of the Kutch locale.			
Best Special Effects	Aalavandhan	Tamil	N. Madhusudhanan	₹ 10,000/-
Best Special Effects	Citation: For its creative execution of live and animated special effects which enhance the dramatic impact of the film.			
Best Choreography	Lagaan ("Ghanan Ghanan")	Hindi	Raju Khan	₹ 10,000/-
Best Choreography	Citation: For choreography of that particular song is very lively and skifully composed keeping our tradition and heritage in mind.			
Special Jury Award	Kutty	Tamil	Janaki Vishwanathan (Director)	₹ 25,000/-
Special Jury Award	Citation: For its realistic portrayal of the transition of a girl child from rural Tamilnadu to Chennai, in search of a livelihood. The film sensitises its viewers to the exploitation of child domestic labour, commonly prevalent within middle class families.			
Special Mention	Panoi-Jongki	Miri / Mising	• Dilip Doley • Narayan Seal (Director)	Certificate Only
Special Mention	Citation: For effectively capturing the spirit of the colourful mongoloid tribe located at the foot hills of Arunachal Pradesh.			

==== Regional Awards ====
The award is given to best film in the regional languages in India.

Name of Award	Name of Film	Awardee(s)	Cash prize
Best Feature Film in Bengali	Hemanter Pakhi	Producer: NFDC; Director: Urmi Chakraborty	₹ 20,000/- Each
Best Feature Film in Bengali	Citation: For showing the plight of an educated woman who seeks her own identity within the trappings of her traditional role of mother and wife. A contemporary socially relevant issue has been handled with great sensitivity.		
Best Feature Film in Hindi	Dil Chahta Hai	Producer: Ritesh Sidhwani; Director: Farhan Akhtar	₹ 20,000/- Each
Best Feature Film in Hindi	Citation: For artistically and humorously portraying the growing up years of young persons in modern society.		
Best Feature Film in Kannada	Atithi	Producer: Mitrachitra; Director: P. Sheshadri	₹ 20,000/- Each
Best Feature Film in Kannada	Citation: For addressing the universal affliction of terrorism. It portrays the impact of this scourge on innocent lives, human relations and behavioural patterns. It examines the issue at a human level with which viewers can empathise.		
Best Feature Film in Malayalam	Dany	Producer: T. V. Chandran; Director: T. V. Chandran	₹ 20,000/- Each
Best Feature Film in Malayalam	Citation: For documenting the life of an ordinary human being who is denied any meaningful relationship within his family. In the end however the film very subtly but effectively brings out the triumph of the dignity of human relationships.		
Best Feature Film in Odia	Magunira Shagada	Producer: NFDC; Director: Prafulla Mohanty	₹ 20,000/- Each
Best Feature Film in Odia	Citation: For showing the agony of a man trapped within tradition and unable to accept the changes that impact life around him.		
Best Feature Film in Tamil	Ooruku Nooruper	Producer: L. Suresh; Director: B. Lenin	₹ 20,000/- Each
Best Feature Film in Tamil	Citation: For depicting a thought provoking story about crime, based on ideology. It reflects upon life, death and justice.		
Best Feature Film in Telugu	Show	Producer: Manjula Ghattamaneni; Director: G. Neelakanta Reddy	₹ 20,000/- Each
Best Feature Film in Telugu	Citation: For depicting the development of human relations between two strangers with spontaneous humour and rare insight into life.		

Best Feature Film in Each of the Language Other Than Those Specified in the Schedule VIII of the Constitution

Name of Award	Name of Film	Awardee(s)	Cash prize
Best Feature Film in English	Mitr, My Friend	Producer: Suresh Menon; Director: Revathi	₹ 20,000/- Each
Best Feature Film in English	Citation: For depicting the agony of individuals torn between social values practised in different societies. It explores the nuances of emotions within a marriage and family.		

=== Non-Feature Films ===
Short Films made in any Indian language and certified by the Central Board of Film Certification as a documentary/newsreel/fiction are eligible for non-feature film section.

==== Juries ====
A committee headed by K. K. Kapil was appointed to evaluate the non-feature films awards. Following were the jury members:

- Jury Members
  - K. K. Kapil (Chairperson) • Dinkar Chowdhary • K. Sudhakar Rao • Naresh Bedi • Shalini Shah

==== Golden Lotus Award ====
Official name: Swarna Kamal

All the awardees are awarded with 'Golden Lotus Award (Swarna Kamal)', a certificate and cash prize.

Name of Award	Name of Film	Language	Awardee(s)	Cash prize
Best Non-Feature Film	Sonal	Hindi and English	Producer: Films Division; Director: Prakash Jha	₹ 25,000/- Each
Best Non-Feature Film	Citation: For its excellent use of the cinematic medium to give an insight into one of the greatest dancers of India.			
Best Non-Feature Film Direction	Jorasanko Thakurbari	English	Buddhadeb Dasgupta	₹ 10,000/- Each
Best Non-Feature Film Direction	Citation: For artistically unfolding the history of the house of the Tagores.			

==== Silver Lotus Award ====
Official name: Rajat Kamal

All the awardees are awarded with 'Silver Lotus Award (Rajat Kamal)' and cash prize.

Name of Award	Name of Film	Language	Awardee(s)	Cash prize
Best First Non-Feature Film	Diary of a Housewife	Malayalam	Producer: Asha Joseph and Vinod Sukumaran; Director: Vinod Sukumaran	₹ 10,000/- Each
Best First Non-Feature Film	Citation: For the innovative approach in narrating the pathos of a housewife who is waiting for her husband to return from war.			
Best Anthropological / Ethnographic Film	The Monpas of Arunachal Pradesh	English	Producer: Films Division; Director: Aribam Syam Sharma	₹ 10,000/- Each
Best Anthropological / Ethnographic Film	Citation: For exploring the vibrant rites and rituals of the Monpa tribe.			
Best Biographical Film	Teejan Bai	Hindi	Producer: Kuldeep Sinha for Films Division; Director: V. Packirisamy	₹ 10,000/- Each
Best Biographical Film	Citation: For the portrayal of the success story of the folk artist.			
Best Environment / Conservation / Preservation Film	The Holy Ganga	Hindi	Producer: Y. N. Engineer for Films Division; Director: Viplove Bhatia	₹ 10,000/- Each
Best Environment / Conservation / Preservation Film	Citation: For its thought provoking content which makes the viewers realise how badly the mother Ganga is treated.			
Best Promotional Film	News Magazine No. 458 (In Search of Muga Silk)	English	Producer: Y.N. Engineer for Films Division; Director: K. G. Das	₹ 10,000/- Each
Best Promotional Film	Citation: For depicting the unique art of Muga silk weaving of Assam.			
Best Film on Social Issues	A New Paradigm	English	Producer: Aruna Raje Patil; Director: Aruna Raje Patil	₹ 10,000/- Each
Best Film on Social Issues	Citation: For dealing with the lives of the mentally challenged, the trauma of their relatives and the endless effort of the teachers to bring hope to this segment of the society.			
Best Educational / Motivational / Instructional Film	Kanavu Malayilekku	Malayalam	Producer: Tomy Mathew; Director: M. G. Sasi	₹ 10,000/- Each
Best Educational / Motivational / Instructional Film	Citation: For its attempt to reassert the tribal identity and impart a sense of dignity to the tribal children.			
Best Investigative Film	Kalahandi	Oriya and English	Producer: Soudamini Mishra; Director: Gautam Ghose	₹ 10,000/- Each
Best Investigative Film	Citation: For its courageous expose of endemic poverty in the backward region of Orissa and the state's apathy to it.			
Best Animation Film	The Pink Camel	Hindi	Producer: Children's Film Society; Director: Paushali Ganguli; Animator: Paushali Ganguli	₹ 10,000/- Each
Best Animation Film	Citation: For interesting animation, enlightening the viewers against superstitions.			
Best Short Fiction Film	Chaitra	Marathi	Producer: Film and Television Institute of India; Director: Kranti Kanade	₹ 10,000/- Each
Best Short Fiction Film	Citation: For beautifully exploring human relations centred around an age-old ritual of Haldi and Kumkum.			
Best Film on Family Welfare	Sayante Thinte Padavukal	Malayalam	Producer: Ratheesh Ramayya; Director: Satheesh Venganoor	₹ 10,000/- Each
Best Film on Family Welfare	Citation: For sensitive portrayal of the plight of the aged who are neglected by their families.			
Best Cinematography	Jorasanko Thakurbari	English	Cameraman: Nilotpal Sarkar; Laboratory Processing: Prasad Film Laboratory	₹ 10,000/- Each
Best Cinematography	Citation: For imaginatively capturing images in light and shade, through smooth movements to bring life to the historical house of the Tagores'.			₹ 10,000/- Each
Best Cinematography	The Monpas of Arunachal Pradesh	English	Cameraman: Irom Maipak; Laboratory Processing: Prasad Kalinga Lab	₹ 10,000/- Each
Best Cinematography	Citation: For his fascinating style of framing under uncontrolled situations.			₹ 10,000/- Each
Best Audiography	Enough of Silence	English	Anup Mukherjee	₹ 10,000/-
Best Audiography	Citation: For adding a new dimension to the film through innovative sound track.			
Best Editing	Athman	Universal	Ajith	₹ 10,000/-
Best Editing	Citation: For maintaining the pace and drama of the film without any spoken words.			
Best Music Direction	Chaitra	Marathi	Bhaskar Chandavarkar	₹ 10,000/-
Best Music Direction	Citation: For creating traditional music that blends aesthetically with the theme of the film.			
Special Jury Award	Orchestra	Hindi	Kireet Khurana (Producer); Bhimsain (Director)	₹ 10,000/-
Special Jury Award	Citation: For effectively conveying the message of national integration through synchronous use of sound and animated images of musical instruments.			
Special Mention	Kalahandi	Oriya and English	A. R. Tripathi	Certificate Only
Special Mention	Citation: For his carefully crafted words giving an additional dimension to the film.			Certificate Only
Special Mention	Chaitra	Marathi	Sonali Kulkarni (Actor)	Certificate Only
Special Mention	Citation: For the subtle display of her wide range of emotions.			Certificate Only

=== Best Writing on Cinema ===
The awards aim at encouraging study and appreciation of cinema as an art form and dissemination of information and critical appreciation of this art-form through publication of books, articles, reviews etc.

==== Juries ====
A committee headed by Bharat Gopy was appointed to evaluate the writing on Indian cinema. Following were the jury members:

- Jury Members
  - Bharat Gopy (Chairperson) • Ratnottama Sengupta • Savita Bhakhry

==== Golden Lotus Award ====
Official name: Swarna Kamal

All the awardees are awarded with 'Golden Lotus Award (Swarna Kamal)' and cash prize.

Name of Award	Name of Book	Language	Awardee(s)	Cash prize
Best Book on Cinema	Asoumiya Chalachitrar Chaa-Pohar	Assamese	Author: Apurba Sarma; Publisher: Jnan Pujari	₹ 7,500/- Each
Best Book on Cinema	Citation: For its panoramic and incisive analysis of Assamese cinema in the context of National and International scenario.			₹ 7,500/- Each
Best Book on Cinema	Moulik Marathi Chitrageete	Marathi	Author: Gangadhar Mahambare; Publisher: Rajiv D. Barve	₹ 7,500/- Each
Best Book on Cinema	Citation: For its lucid, anecdotal narration of the growth of Marathi cinema through its film songs.			₹ 7,500/- Each
Best Film Critic		Hindi	Vinod Anupam	₹ 15,000/-
Best Film Critic	Citation: For the deep insight and social concern reflected in his questioning of phenomenon as varied as the disappearance of villages from Hindi screen and the glorification of terrorism.			

==== Special Mention ====
All the award winners are awarded with Certificate of Merit.

Name of Award	Language	Awardee(s)	Cash prize
Special Mention (Film Critic)	Malayalam	Author: C. S. Venkiteswaran	Certificate Only
Special Mention (Film Critic)	Citation: For his serious approach in understanding the celluloid idiom and its social implications.		

=== Awards not given ===
Following were the awards not given as no film was found to be suitable for the award:

- Best Children's Film
- Best Film on Family Welfare
- Best Film on Environment / Conservation / Preservation
- Best Feature Film in Assamese
- Best Feature Film in Manipuri
- Best Feature Film in Marathi
- Best Feature Film in Punjabi
- Best Arts / Cultural Film
- Best Scientific Film
- Best Agricultural Film
- Best Historical Reconstruction / Compilation Film
- Best Exploration / Adventure Film
