= 72nd National Film Awards =

Award ceremony for Indian films of 2024

- Awarded for: Best of Indian cinema in 2024
- Awarded by: National Film Award Cell
- Presented by: President of India
- Announced on: 18 July 2026
- Presented on: 22 September 2026
- Site: Kevadiya, Gujarat
- Official website: nfaindia.org/en

Highlights
- Best Feature Film: Article 370
- Best Non-Feature Film: Bhangaar
- Best Book: Naaniruvude Nimagaagi Naadiruvude Nanagaagi: Kannada Cinemada Thathva Matthu Rajakeeya
- Best Film Critic: Sanjeev Shrivastava
- Dadasaheb Phalke Award: Anant Nag
- Most awards: Amaran, Article 370 and Mithya (3)

The 72nd National Film Awards, presented by the National Film Award Cell, Ministry of Information and Broadcasting were announced on 18 July 2026 in a press conference to honour the best of Indian cinema in 2024. There were 400 entries in the feature film category, 161 in non-feature films, 38 books, and 24 critics’ submissions. The political action-thriller Article 370 was awarded Best Feature Film and the dystopian science fiction Kalki 2898 AD was awarded Best Popular Feature Film.

The winners along with the Dadasaheb Phalke Award recipient were felicitated by the President, Droupadi Murmu on 22 September 2026 at Kevadia, Gujarat.

== Selection process ==
The National Film Award Cell, Ministry of Information and Broadcasting invited online entries for the awards. Feature and Non-Feature Films certified by the Central Board of Film Certification between 1 January 2024, and 31 December 2024, were eligible for the film award categories. Entries of dubbed, revised or copied versions of a film or translation, abridgements, edited or annotated works and reprints were ineligible for the awards.

For the feature and non-feature Films sections, films in any Indian language, shot on 16 mm, 35 mm, a wider film gauge or a digital format, and released in cinemas, on video or digital formats for home viewing were eligible.

== Dadasaheb Phalke Award ==
Introduced in 1969, the Dadasaheb Phalke Award is India's highest award in the field of cinema given to recognise the contributions of film personalities towards the development of Indian cinema and for distinguished contributions to the medium, its growth and promotion. The recipient is awarded with 'Golden Lotus Award' (Swarna Kamal), cash prize of ₹10 lakh (US$11,000), medallion and a shawl.

A committee consisting three personalities from the Indian film industry was appointed to evaluate the award. Following were the jury members:

- Jury Members

• Mithun Chakraborty
• Paresh Rawal
• Ashutosh Gowariker

Award	Image	Awardee(s)	Awarded As	Cash prize
Dadasaheb Phalke Award		Anant Nag	Actor	Swarna Kamal, ₹10 lakh (US$11,000), medallion and a shawl

== Feature films ==
=== Jury ===
For the Feature Film section, six committees were formed based on the different geographic regions in India. The two-tier evaluation process included a central committee and five regional committees. The central committee, headed by the director Jayaraj, included the heads of each regional committee and five other jury members. At regional level, each committee consisted of one chief and three or four members. The chief and one non-chief member of each regional committee were selected from outside that geographic region. The table below names the jury members for the central and regional committees:

Central Jury

• Jayaraj (Chairperson)
• V. N. Aditya	• Archana Udupa
• Aseem Bajaj	• Kala Master
• Meera Chopra	• Napoleon RZ Thanga
• Om Raut	• Priya Krishnaswamy
• Rakesh Ranjan	• Sreelekha Mukherji

Northern Region: (Bhojpuri, Dogri, English, Hindi, Punjabi, Rajasthani, Urdu)

• Akshay Parija (Head)
• Arfi Lamba	• Ajay Kumar
• Panchakshari

Eastern Region: (Assamese, Bengali, Odia and North-Eastern languages)

• B. S. Basavaraju (Head)
• Sanjeev Rattan	• Surya Deo
• Thokchom Jimmy	• Tushar Kanti Bandyopadhyay

Western Region: (Gujarati, Konkani, Marathi)

• Supratim Bhol (Head)
• Kshitija Khandagale	• Pritesh Sodha
• Shashi Khandare

Southern Region I: (Malayalam, Tamil)

• Manju Borah (Head)
• Adeep Tandon	• Manoj Pillai
• S Muthu Ganesh	• Santhosh Damodharan

Southern Region II: (Kannada, Telugu)

• Gopi Desai (Head)
• M S Prasad	• Prashanthi Harathi
• Sandesh Shetty Ajri

=== Golden Lotus Award ===
Official Name: Swarna Kamal

All the awardees are awarded with 'Golden Lotus Award (Swarna Kamal)', a certificate and cash prize.

Award	Film	Language	Awardee(s)	Cash prize
Best Feature Film	Article 370	Hindi	Producer: Jio Studios and B62 Studios; Director: Aditya Suhas Jambhale	₹3,00,000 each
Best Debut Film of a Director	Swatantrya Veer Savarkar	Hindi	Randeep Hooda	₹3,00,000
Best Popular Film Providing Wholesome Entertainment	Kalki 2898 AD	Telugu	Producer: Vyjayanthi Movies; Director: Nag Ashwin	₹3,00,000 each
Best Children's Film	35 Chinna Katha Kaadu	Telugu	Producer: S Originals and Waltair Productions; Director: Nanda Kishore Emani	₹3,00,000 each
Best Direction	Amaran	Tamil	Rajkumar Periasamy	₹3,00,000

=== Silver Lotus Award ===
Official Name: Rajat Kamal

All the awardees are awarded with 'Silver Lotus Award (Rajat Kamal)', a certificate and cash prize.

Award	Film	Language	Awardee(s)	Cash prize
Best Feature Film Promoting National, Social and Environmental Values	Captain Miller	Tamil	Producer: Sathya Jyothi Films; Director: Arun Matheswaran	₹2,00,000 each
Best Actor in a Leading Role	Bramayugam	Malayalam	Mammootty	₹2,00,000 shared
Best Actor in a Leading Role	Chandu Champion	Hindi	Kartik Aaryan	₹2,00,000 shared
Best Actress in a Leading Role	Article 370	Hindi	Yami Gautam	₹2,00,000
Best Actor in a Supporting Role	Bhakshak	Hindi	Sanjay Mishra	₹2,00,000
Best Actress in a Supporting Role	Maharaja	Tamil	Sachana Namidass	₹2,00,000 shared
Best Actress in a Supporting Role	Mithya	Kannada	Roopashree Varkady	₹2,00,000 shared
Best Child Artist	Mithya	Kannada	Athish S Shetty	₹2,00,000 shared
Best Child Artist	35 Chinna Katha Kaadu	Telugu	Arundev Pothula	₹2,00,000 shared
Best Child Artist	Onko Ki Kothin	Bengali	Riddhiman Banerjee	₹2,00,000 shared
Best Child Artist	Onko Ki Kothin	Bengali	Tapomoy Deb	₹2,00,000 shared
Best Child Artist	Onko Ki Kothin	Bengali	Gitashree Chakraborty	₹2,00,000 shared
Best Male Playback Singer	Gharat Ganpati (Song: "Navasachi Gauri Mazi")	Marathi	Abhay Jodhpurkar	₹2,00,000
Best Female Playback Singer	ARM (Song: "Angu Vaana Konilu")	Malayalam	Vaikom Vijayalakshmi	₹2,00,000
Best Cinematography	Bramayugam	Malayalam	Shehnad Jalal	₹2,00,000
Best Screenplay • Screenplay Writer (Original)	Pushpa 2: The Rule	Telugu	Sukumar	₹2,00,000
Best Screenplay • Screenplay Writer (Adapted)	Swargandharva Sudhir Phadke	Marathi	Yogesh Deshpande	₹2,00,000
Best Screenplay • Dialogues	Lucky Baskhar	Telugu	Venky Atluri	₹2,00,000
Best Sound Design	Bhool Bhulaiyaa 3	Hindi	Manas Choudhury	₹2,00,000
Best Editing	Amaran	Tamil	R. Kalaivannan	₹2,00,000
Best Production Design	Kalki 2898 AD	Telugu	Nitin Zihani Choudhary	₹2,00,000
Best Costume Design	Pushpa 2: The Rule	Telugu	Deepali Noor	₹2,00,000 shared
Best Costume Design	Pushpa 2: The Rule	Telugu	Sheetal Sharma	₹2,00,000 shared
Best Make-up	Committee Kurrollu	Telugu	P Ravi Kumar	₹2,00,000
Best Music Direction • Songs	Article 370	Hindi	Shashwat Sachdev	₹2,00,000
Best Music Direction • Background Music	Amaran	Tamil	G. V. Prakash Kumar	₹2,00,000
Best Lyrics	Maidaan (Song: "Jaane Do")	Hindi	Manoj Muntashir	₹2,00,000
Best Choreography	Stree 2 (Song: "Aaj Ki Raat")	Hindi	Vijay Ganguly	₹2,00,000
Best Stunt Choreography	Maharaja	Tamil	Anal Arasu	₹2,00,000

=== Regional awards ===
All the awardees are awarded with Silver Lotus Award (Rajat Kamal), a certificate and cash prize.

Best Feature Film in Each of the Language Specified in the Schedule VIII of the Constitution
Award	Film	Awardee(s)		Cash prize
Award	Film	Producer	Director	Cash prize
Best Assamese Feature Film	Juiphool	Jadumoni Dutta		₹2,00,000 each
Best Bengali Feature Film	Chaalchitra Ekhon	Anjan Dutt Production	Anjan Dutt	₹2,00,000 each
Best Gujarati Feature Film	Maaran	CineMan Productions Limited	Abhishek Jain	₹2,00,000 each
Best Hindi Feature Film	Srikanth	T-Series and Chalk N Cheese Films Production	Tushar Hiranandani	₹2,00,000 each
Best Kannada Feature Film	Mithya	Paramvah Studios and KRG Studios	Sumanth Bhat	₹2,00,000 each
Best Konkani Feature Film	Mog Asum	Flowing Mandovi Films, R S Creations and Kathputlee Arts and Films	Radheshyam Pipalwa and Agnelo Angelo Braganza	₹2,00,000 each
Best Malayalam Feature Film	Feminichi Fathima	1001 Stories and AFD Cinemas	Fasil Muhammed	₹2,00,000 each
Best Manipuri Feature Film	Sunita	Skyline Pictures, Khuman Leipak Pictures, H. M. Production and Cultural Society Khuman Maheikol Production	Yumnam Ajit Singh	₹2,00,000 each
Best Marathi Feature Film	Mu. Po. Bombilwaadi	Vivek Films and Mayasabha Karamanuk Mandali	Paresh Mokashi	₹2,00,000 each
Best Odia Feature Film	Lahari	Jhilik Motion Pictures	Amartya Bhattacharyya	₹2,00,000 each
Best Tamil Feature Film	Raayan	Sun Pictures	Dhanush	₹2,00,000 each
Best Telugu Feature Film	Committee Kurrollu	Pink Elephant Pictures and Shree Radha Damodara Studios	Yadhu Vamsi	₹2,00,000 each

Best Feature Film in Each of the Language Other Than Those Specified In the Schedule VIII of the Constitution
Award	Film	Awardee(s)		Cash prize
Award	Film	Producer	Director	Cash prize
Best Garhwali Feature Film	Dholi	SC Pharmachem Pvt. Ltd.	Dinesh P. Bhonsle	₹2,00,000 each
Best Tulu Feature Film	Imbu	Pichchar Studio	Shivadhwaj Shetty	₹2,00,000 each

=== Special Mention ===
All the awardees are awarded with a certificate.

Award	Film	Language	Awardee(s)	Cash prize
Special Mention	Captain Miller	Tamil	Dhanush (Actor)	Certificate only
Special Mention	Meiyazhagan	Tamil	Suren G (Sound Mix Engineer)	Certificate only

== Non-Feature Film ==
Non-feature length films made in any Indian language and certified by the Central Board of Film Certification as a documentary, short film, animation film etc are eligible for non-feature film section.

=== Jury ===
• Aseem Sinha (Chairperson)
• E. V. Ganeshbabu	• James Khangenbam
• Harri Nair	• Kamlesh Udasi
• Kedaar Gaekwad	• Thripthi Sundar Abhikar

=== Golden Lotus Award ===
Official Name: Swarna Kamal

All the awardees are awarded with 'Golden Lotus Award (Swarna Kamal)', a certificate and cash prize.

Award	Film	Language	Awardee(s)	Cash prize
Best Non-Feature Film	Bhangaar	Marathi and English	Producer and Director: Sumira Roy	₹3,00,000 each
Best Direction	Statue of Unity – Ekta ka Prateek	Hindi	Aanand L. Rai	₹3,00,000
Best Debut Film of a Director	Angen	Santhali	Ravi Raj Murmu	₹3,00,000

=== Silver Lotus Award ===
Official Name: Rajat Kamal

All the awardees are awarded with Silver Lotus Award (Rajat Kamal) and cash prize.

Award	Film	Language	Awardee(s)	Cash prize
Best Biographical / Historical Reconstruction / Compilation Film	Kakori	Hindi	Producer: KSR Brothers; Director: Kamlesh K Mishra	₹2,00,000 each
Best Arts / Cultural Film	Main Nida	Hindi	Producer: Sampreshan Multimedia; Director: Atul Pandey	₹2,00,000 each
Best Documentary	Ram-Nami	Hindi	Producer: BBP Studio Virtual Bharat; Director: Bharatbala Ganapathy	₹2,00,000 each
Best Non-Feature Film Promoting Social And Environmental Values	Piplantri: A Tale of Eco Feminism	Hindi, Rajasthani and English	Producer: Johnsons Suraj Films International; Director: Suraj Kumar	₹2,00,000 each
Best Animation Film	Touched as Water	Silent	Producer: JB Productions; Director: Joshy Benedict; Animator: Joshy Benedict	₹2,00,000 each
Best Short Film	Hamsafar	Marathi	Producer: Anushka Motion Pictures and Entertainments; Director: Abhijeet Arvind Dalvi	₹2,00,000 each
Best Cinematography	Life in Loom	English, Tamil, Hindi, Assamese and Bengali	Edmond Ranson	₹2,00,000
Best Sound Design	Blue	Tamil	T S Hari Hara Sudhan	₹2,00,000
Best Editing	NDA	Hindi	Manvir Jasrotia	₹2,00,000
Best Music Direction	Parat 41°chya Magavar	Marathi	Shivpal Singh Kang	₹2,00,000
Best Narration / Voice Over	Little Planet: A Tale of Frogs	English	Soundarya Jayachandran	₹2,00,000
Best Script	Obur	Hindi and Kashmiri	Faraz Ali	₹2,00,000

=== Special Mention ===
All the awardees are awarded with a certificate.

Award	Film	Language	Awardee(s)	Cash prize
Special Mention	Bhadra-Kali Natakam	Malayalam	Ananda Jyothi (Director)	Certificate only
Special Mention	Chola Dora aur Sui	Hindi	Jaymin Modi and Lokesh Ghai (Directors)	Certificate only

== Best Writing on Cinema ==
The awards aim at encouraging study and appreciation of cinema as an art form and dissemination of information and critical appreciation of this art-form through publication of books, articles, reviews etc.

=== Jury ===
• A. Chandrasekhar (Chairperson)
• Rwita Dutta	• Sujata Shiven

=== Golden Lotus Award ===
Official Name: Swarna Kamal

All the awardees are awarded with the Golden Lotus Award (Swarna Kamal) accompanied with a cash prize.

Award	Book	Language	Awardee(s)	Cash prize
Best Book on Cinema	Naaniruvude Nimagaagi Naadiruvude Nanagaagi: Kannada Cinemada Thathva Matthu Rajakeeya	Kannada	Author: Pradeep Kumar Shetty K.; Publisher: Mirror Pusthaka	₹1,00,000 each
Best Film Critic	—N/a	Hindi	Sanjeev Shrivastava	₹1,00,000
