= Imagine Film Company =

Indian Film Studio

NDTV Imagine Film Company
- Type: Broadcast, television and online
- Country: India
- Availability: India
- Owner: Prannoy Roy
- Key people: Prannoy Roy, Chairman, NDTV Group; Radhika Roy; Narayan Rao
- Launch date: 1999
- Official website: www.ndtv.com

The NDTV Imagine Film Company (also known as the Imagine Film Company) is a 1999 film company founded by Prannoy Roy . Radhika Roy and Narayan Rao are related to Prannoy Roy and all three of them are the official NDTV Film Company key peoples. The Imagine Film Company mostly makes Indian Bollywood films which are usually Animated or 3-d. It also distributed Roadside Romeo, a family animation about street-dogs, and soon will produce the classic animated remake of Kuch Kuch Hota Hai, Koochie Koochie Hota Hai, with Shahrukh Khan, Rani Mukerji, Sanjay Dutt, Kajol, Uday Chopra and Riteish Deshmukh's voice. It will soon also produce the first 3-D family drama called Toonpur Ka Super Hero with Ajay Devgn and Kajol Devgn in lead roles.

== Filmography ==
Year	Film	Director	Notes
2008	Roadside Romeo	Jugal Hansraj	Animated Film
2009	Madurai Sambavam	Youreka	Tamil Film
2010	033	Birsa Dasgupta	Bengali Film
2010	Koochie Koochie Hota Hain	Karan Johar	Animated Film
2010	Toonpur Ka Superrhero	Kireet Khurana	

== Controversies ==
NDTV's infotainment channel NDTV imagine had been criticised by children's rights groups accusing it of "exploitation of infants" in its Reality Show "Pati, Patni aur Woh"(Husband, Wife and the other one), a program inspired by The Baby Borrowers of BBC. National Commission for Protection of Child Rights(NCPCR) and the Women and Child Development ministry (WCD) has asked NDTV Imagine to stop the telecast of this reality show.

NDTV is widely regarded as pro-Congress, the longest ruling party of India.

== Latest awards ==
- NAB 2008 International Broadcasting Excellence Award - NDTV Labs
- CBA-Thomson Foundation Journalist of the Year Award - Sutapa Deb
- CBA-IBC Award for Innovative Engineering - NDTV Labs

husband wife and IT

== Notable personalities ==
- Deepti Sachdeva
- Monideepa Banerjee
- Barkha Dutt
- Natasha Jog
- Sonia Singh
- Nidhi Kulpati
- Nidhi Razdan
- Nitin Gokhale
- Pankaj Pachauri
- Prannoy Roy
- Siddharth Vinayak Patankar
- Vinod Dua
- Vikram A Chandra
- Vishnu Som
- Sonali Chander
- Kismet Singh
