= National Film Award for Best Debut Film of a Director (non-feature film) =

Indian film award

- National award for contributions to non-feature films
- Awarded for: Best debutant directorial work for a short film of a year
- Sponsored by: National Film Development Corporation of India
- Formerly called: National Film Award for Best First Non-Feature Film of a Director (1991–2021)
- Rewards: Swarna Kamal (Golden Lotus); ₹3,00,00
- First award: 1991 (Instituted in 1989)
- Most recent winner: Ravi Raj Murmu , Angen (2024)

The National Film Award for Best Debut Film of a Director is one of the National Film Awards presented annually by the National Film Development Corporation of India. It is one of several awards presented for non-feature films and awarded with Golden Lotus (Swarna Kamal).

The award was instituted in 1989, at 37th National Film Awards and awarded annually for films produced in the year across the country, in all Indian languages. Since the 70th National Film Awards, the name was changed to "Best Debut Film of a Director" and was changed the status from Silver Lotus to Golden Lotus. Also, the director is alone eligible for the award since this edition.

== Winners ==
Award includes 'Rajat Kamal' (Silver Lotus) and cash prize. Following are the award winners over the years:

Indicates a joint award for that year

=== 1992–present ===
List of award recipients, showing the year, film(s), language(s), producer(s) and director(s)
Year	Film(s)	Language(s)	Producer(s)	Director(s)	Refs.
1991 (39th)	Kamlabai	Marathi and Hindi	Reena Mohan	Reena Mohan	
1992 (40th)	Knock-Out	Tamil	B. Lenin	B. Lenin	
1993 (41st)	Bazar Sitaram	Hindi	Neena Gupta for Films Division	Neena Gupta	
1994 (42nd)	A Little War	Hindi	FTII	Atanu Biswas	
1995 (43rd)	All Alone If Need Be	English	Amulya Kakati	Ranjit Das	
1996 (44th)	Yeh Woh Sahar To Nahin	Hindi	FTII	Sudhakar Rao	
1997 (45th)	Mizhavu – A Silent Drum Beat	English	P. D. Raphel	K. R. Subhash	
1998 (46th)	Repentance	Malayalam	Mohan Agashe for Films Division	Rajeev Raj	
1999 (47th)	Deivangal Padiyirangumbol (When Gods Depart)	Tamil	Pradeep Kumar	Pradeep Kumar	
2000 (48th)	Meena Jha	Hindi	Satyajit Ray Film and Television Institute	Anjalika Sharma	
2001 (49th)	Diary of a Housewife	Malayalam	Asha Joseph and Vinod Sukumaran	Vinod Sukumaran	
2002 (50th)	Paramapatham	Tamil	Film and Television Institute of Tamil Nadu	Prabhu Radhakrishnan	
2002 (50th)	Beyond or Within	English	P. T. M. Payyoli	Vinod Mankara	
2003 (51st)	An Encounter with a Life Living	Hindi and English	Vinu Abraham	Suja	
2004 (52nd)	Ek Sagar Kinaree... A Seaside Story	Marathi and English	Gomantak Marathi Academy	Laxmikant Shetgaonkar	
2005 (53rd)	John and Jane	English	Ashim Ahluwalia	Ashim Ahluwalia	
2006 (54th)	Andhiyum	Malayalam	N. Dinesh Rajkumar	Jacob Verghese	
2007 (55th)	Lal Juto	Bengali	Satyajit Ray Film and Television Institute	Shweta Merchant	
2008 (56th)	Vitthal	Marathi	Vinoo Choliparambil and Manu Pushpendran	Vinoo Choliparambil	
2009 (57th)	Vaishnav Jan Toh	Hindi	FTII	Kaushal Oza	
2009 (57th)	Ekti Kaktaliyo Golpo	Bengali	FTII	Tathagata Singha	
2010 (58th)	Pistulya	Marathi and Telugu	Nagraj Manjule	Nagraj Manjule	
2011 (59th)	The Silent Poet	Meitei	Borun Thokchom	Borun Thokchom	
2012 (60th)	Eka Gachha Eka Manisa Eka Samudra	Oriya	Veenu Bhushan Vaid	Lipika Singh Darai	
2013 (61st)	Kanyaka	Malayalam	Satyajit Ray Film and Television Institute	Christo Tomy	
2014 (62nd)	Goonga Pehelwan	Hindi and English	Drishti Media	Mit Jani, Prateek Gupta and Vivek Chaudhary	
2015 (63rd)	Daaravtha	Marathi	Nishantroy Bombarde	Nishantroy Bombarde	
2016 (64th)	Soz...A Ballad of Maladies	Hindi, Kashmiri and English	Rajiv Mehrotra	Tushar Madhav	
2017 (65th)	Water Baby	Konkani	Varun Shah	Pia Shah	
2018 (66th)	Feluda: 50 Years of Ray's Detective	Bengali	Sagnik Chatterjee	Sagnik Chatterjee	
2019 (67th)	Khisa	Marathi	Santosh Maithani	Raj Pritam More	
2020 (68th)	Pariah	Marathi and Hindi	MIT School of Film & Television	Vishesh Iyer	
2021 (69th)	Paanchika	Gujarati	Shreya Kapadiya	Ankit Kothari	

=== 2022–present ===
Since the 70th National Film Awards, director alone is awarded.

List of award films, showing the year (award ceremony), language(s) and director(s)
Year	Film(s)	Language(s)	Director(s)	Refs.
2022 (70th)	Madhyantara	Kannada	Basti Dinesh Shenoy	
2023 (71st)	Mau: The Spirit Dreams of Cheraw	Mizo	Shilpika Bordoloi	
2024 (72nd)	Angen	Santhali	Ravi Raj Murmu	
