= Paro Pinaki Ki Kahani =

2026 Indian drama film

- Theatrical release poster
- Directed by: Rudra Jadon
- Produced by: Eshita Singh; Sanjay Bishnoi; Utkarsh Singh; Pratap Jadon Samar
- Starring: Eshita Singh; Sanjay Bishnoi
- Cinematography: Abhay Balkawade
- Edited by: Sandeep Singh; Rudra Jadon
- Music by: Songs: Vicky Kaler; Zakir; Britto Khangchian; Score: Britto Khangchian
- Production companies: Seraphity Studios; 363 Trees Production
- Release date: 6 February 2026
- Running time: 92 minutes
- Country: India
- Language: Hindi

Paro Pinaki Ki Kahani (transl. The story of Paro and Pinaki) is a 2026 Indian Hindi-language drama film directed by Rudra Jadon. The film stars Eshita Singh and Sanjay Bishnoi. Eshita Singh plays the role of Mariyam, a vegetable vendor who is in love with Pinaki, a sewage cleaner played by Sanjay Bishnoi. The film follows Pinaki's journey as he tries to find his girlfriend after she goes missing. It also deals with the interfaith romance between Pinaki, a Hindu boy, and Mariyam, a Muslim girl.

== Cast ==
- Eshita Singh as Mariyam "Paro"
- Sanjay Bishnoi as Pinaki
- Hanuman Soni as Anwar
- Dhananjay Sardeshpande as Aamir
- Madan Deodhar as Ramdas
- Jagdish Laduram Motha as Aanand
- Sunny Jagdish Motha as Shanta
- Hemant Kadam as Pinaki's father

== Music ==
The music was composed by Vicky Kaler, Zakir, and Britto Khangchian.

Track listing
No.	Title	Lyrics	Music	Singer(s)	Length
1.	"Zindagi Jeena Chaundi Aa"	Vicky Kaler	Vicky Kaler, Zakir	Vicky Kaler	2:06
2.	"Charkha"	Baba Bulleh Shah, Khuwaja Ghulam Fareed	Britto Khangchian	Rahul Solanki, Aarush Purabiya	5:04
3.	"Chan Kithan"	Vicky Kaler	Britto Khangchian	Shailey Bidwaikar	2:06
4.	"Aakhari Baari"	Vicky Kaler	Vicky Kaler, Zakir	Vicky Kaler	2:40
5.	"Ekla Mat Chhod"	—	Britto Khangchian	Neeraj Aarya	6:14
Total length:					18:10

== Release ==
Paro Pinaki Ki Kahani was released theatrically on 6 February 2026.

== Reception ==
Rahul Desai of The Hollywood Reporter India wrote, "the storytelling is too undeveloped to realise any of the themes. It's a sensibility and craft issue, not a budget and aesthetic issue. The writing lacks life experience; the sound design is half-baked; the editing is patchy and transition shots are missing (the screen cuts to black if any action requires even the most basic choreography)". Amit Bhatia of ABP Live rated the film 3.5/5 and wrote, "Rudra Jadon’s writing is strong, and the direction is equally effective. No scene feels unnecessary, and the pacing ensures the audience never gets bored." Devesh Sharma of Filmfare rated the film 3/5 stars and wrote, "The direction and screenplay could have been sharper and more cohesive. Certain narrative choices raise questions [...] While it may not achieve the emotional and political heft of a Shyam Benegal film, Paro Pinaki Ki Kahani remains a well-intentioned, compassionate effort, one that may falter in execution". Abhishek Srivastava of The Times of India rated the film 2.5/5 stars and wrote, "The film incorporates themes such as caste discrimination, women’s exploitation, and poverty but fails to present them in a coherent manner. Despite its short runtime, the storytelling lacks clarity, and several ideas remain underdeveloped."

Ekta Gupta of Jagran Prakashan rated the film 3.5/5 stars. A critic from Film Information wrote, "Rudra Jadon’s story offers no novelty whatsoever and is also dull and boring. His screenplay is so weak that the drama just doesn’t move ahead. Although the lovers get separated, the audience simply don’t feel any empathy for the two of them." Farhad Dalal of Popcorn Reviewss wrote, "The editing pattern remains a big drawback here. The style remains choppy, something that is further exposed given that there are no transition scenes along the way. As a result, even the tone of the drama feels jerky, never always allowing you to settle in the drama." Manushri Bajpai of Moneycontrol rated the film 3.5/5.
