= Party (1984 film) =

- Directed by: Govind Nihalani
- Written by: Govind Nihalani
- Based on: Party by Mahesh Elkunchwar
- Produced by: NFDC
- Starring: Manohar Singh; Vijaya Mehta; Rohini Hattangadi; Om Puri; Naseeruddin Shah
- Cinematography: Govind Nihalani
- Edited by: Renu Saluja
- Release date: 1984
- Running time: 118 minutes
- Country: India
- Language: Hindi

Party is a 1984 Indian Hindi-language film directed by Govind Nihalani. The film boasted an ensemble cast, including Vijaya Mehta, Manohar Singh, Om Puri, Naseeruddin Shah, Amrish Puri and Rohini Hattangadi. It based on the play Party (1976) by Mahesh Elkunchwar.

The film was produced by National Film Development Corporation of India (NFDC). Party was the official Indian entry to the 32nd International Film Festival of India, New Delhi.

== Plot ==
The entire action is confined to an evening party hosted by Damyanti Rane, a rich middle-aged widow and well-known patron of the arts in the city. All the patrons of the urban milieu make a beeline to the event.

The party is hosted in the honour of Diwakar Barve, a celebrated playwright, who has just been awarded the prestigious National Literary Award. There are gradual revelations in conversations between attendees of the party — by turns catty, outraged, resigned and cynical — that he got the award because he is Damyanti's lover, who wields political clout, or a toady of the establishment.

Gradually, all the conversation gears towards the real winner, the hero-in-absentia: Amrit, an immensely talented and promising writer-poet who left the politics of the party circuit and literary societies to go live and work with the tribal community.

Amrit, though not present in person, shows himself again and again in their conversations reminding them and viewers of their banality, deceit, and their utter callousness towards the inequities in society at large, which brings them at cross-purposes to the true aim of all art and artistic endeavours: the ennoblement of humanity.

In a harrowing finale, which cuts to the heartland of the country, Amrit is shown to be murdered by the police as a "left-wing terrorist" approximately at the same time as the party was going on.

== Cast ==
- Manohar Singh as Diwakar Barve
- Vijaya Mehta as Damayanti Rane
- Rohini Hattangadi as Mohini
- Om Puri as Avinash, Journalist
- Naseeruddin Shah as Amrit
- Deepa Sahi as Sona Rane
- Amrish Puri as Damayanti's Partner
- Shafi Inamdar as Ravi
- Gulan Kripalani as Vrinda
- Ila Arun as Ila
- Soni Razdan as Malvika (Vicky)
- Mohan Bhandari as Vicky's husband Naren
- Jayant Kripalani as Karan
- K.K. Raina as Bharat
- Kanvaljeet
- Pearl Padamsee as Ruth
- Nikhil Kapur as Subhash
- Savita Prabhune as Ravi's fan
- Benjamin Gilani as Sahani
- Akash Khurana as Agashe
- Ravi Jhankal
- Madan Jain

== Reception ==
Shaikh Ayaz of The Indian Express gave a positive review to the film and commented "With an awful lot of serious talks and fascinating arguments and counter-arguments, this ensemble skit that released 35 years ago is still extraordinarily relevant for having the audacity to expose the pettiness and pretensions of the educated elite. Party's fundamental question, 'What is the role of art (and artists) in society?' remains just as intriguing today". Rebika Kunwar of The Farsight gave a positive review and wrote "The 1984 film mocks hypocrisy and the shallow ideology of socialites, who claim social commitment, transpire to superficial dogma, and are oblivious to horribility of reality. After 39 years, its relevance remains intact". Triya Gulati of The Print gave a positive review for the film and wrote "Party stands as one of the finest achievements of Indian parallel cinema: literate, furious, and entirely unwilling to let anyone in the room, including us, off the hook".

== Awards ==
- 1985: National Film Award for Best Supporting Actress: Rohini Hattangadi
