= Mithya (2023 film) =

2023 Indian film by Sumanth Bhat

- Directed by: Sumanth Bhat
- Written by: Sumanth Bhat
- Produced by: Rakshit Shetty
- Starring: Atish S Shetty; Prakash Thuminad; Roopashree Varkady
- Cinematography: Udit Khurana
- Edited by: Bhuvanesh Manivannan
- Music by: Midhun Mukundan
- Production company: Paramvah Pictures
- Distributed by: KRG Studios
- Release dates: 1 December 2023 (MAMI Mumbai); 7 March 2025 (India)
- Running time: 100 minutes
- Country: India
- Language: Kannada

Mithya is a 2023 Indian Kannada-language drama film written and directed by Sumanth Bhat, and produced by Rakshit Shetty. The film stars Atish S Shetty, Prakash Thuminad and Roopashree Varkady.

The film premiered at the MAMI Mumbai Film Festival 2023 on 1 December 2023 and was released theatrically on 7 March 2025. The film received critical acclaim towards the direction, writing, sound design and Atish Shetty's performance. It won three awards at the 72nd National Film Awards, including the Best Kannada Feature Film.

== Cast ==
- Atish S Shetty as Mithun aka Mithya
- Prakash Thuminad as Surya, Mithya's uncle
- Roopashree Varkady as Jyothi, Mithya's aunt
- Avish S Shetty as Vandana

== Music ==
The soundtrack is composed by Midhun Mukundan.

Original Soundtrack
No.	Title	Length
1.	"Train Tracks"	0:59
2.	"The Light House Run"	1:17
3.	"Staying Afloat"	0:58
4.	"First Flight"	1:19
5.	"Ladybird"	0:49
6.	"Mithya"	1:39
7.	"Trailer Theme"	1:42

== Release and reception ==
Mithya premiered at the MAMI Mumbai Film Festival 2023 on 1 December 2023. It also played at the Bengaluru International Film Festival, the New York Indian Film Festival, the London Indian Film Festival, the Indian Film Festival of Melbourne and others. It was certified by the Central Board of Film Certification in February 2024 and released theatrically on 7 March 2025.

== Reception ==
Sanjay Ponnappa of India Today rated it 4 out of 5 and noted the performances of the lead cast and Sumanth Bhat's direction. He further stated that the film "serves as an audiovisual case study of a filmmaking style that continues to be underappreciated in India". Swaroop Kodur of The News Minute also gave the same rating and praised the technical aspects along with Atish Shetty's performance. The Hindu's Vivek M. V. stated that Atish is the "soul of Mithya" and praised the direction and background score. Vishal Menon of The Hollywood Reporter India too echoed the same and was highly positive towards the screenplay.

Appreciating Atish Shetty's performance, Rediff.com's Sreehari Nair gave a special appreciation towards cinematography, dialogue and sound design. Aditya Shrikrishna of The Federal felt that the film "is ostensibly about Mithya but it’s also about the follies of grown-ups and the consequences that befall the children".

== Accolades ==
Award (Note: Awards, festivals and organizations are in alphabetical order.)	Date of ceremony (Note: Date is linked to the article about the awards held that year, wherever possible.)	Category	Recipient(s)	Result	Ref.
Bengaluru International Film Festival	7 March 2024	Asian Cinema – Special Jury Mention	Sumanth Bhat	Won	
Indian Film Festival of Melbourne	16 August 2024	Best Director (Critics' Choice)	Sumanth Bhat	Nominated	
National Film Awards	August 2026	Best Actress in a Supporting Role	Roopashree Varkady	Won	
National Film Awards	August 2026	Best Child Artist	Atish S Shetty	Won	
National Film Awards	August 2026	Best Kannada Feature Film	Rakshit Shetty (producer); Sumanth Bhat (director)	Won	
New York Indian Film Festival	2 June 2024	Best Film	Sumanth Bhat	Nominated	
New York Indian Film Festival	2 June 2024	Best Director	Sumanth Bhat	Nominated	
New York Indian Film Festival	2 June 2024	Best Debut Film	Sumanth Bhat	Won	
New York Indian Film Festival	2 June 2024	FCCI Best Director	Sumanth Bhat	Won	
New York Indian Film Festival	2 June 2024	Best Actor	Atish S Shetty	Nominated	
