= Bhaskar Chandavarkar =

Indian composer (1936–2009)

- Born: 16 March 1936
- Origin: Pune, Maharashtra, India
- Died: 26 July 2009 (aged 73) Pune, Maharashtra, India
- Genre: Hindustani classical music
- Occupations: composer, music director
- Instrument: sitar

Bhaskar Chandavarkar (16 March 1936 – 26 July 2009) was an Indian sitar player, academic and film and theatre composer who worked with well-known directors of Indian cinema like Mrinal Sen, Girish Karnad, Aparna Sen, K. G. George and Amol Palekar in various languages including Marathi, Hindi, Kannada, Malayalam, Bengali and Oriya and was known for his blending of Indian classical and western music.

He taught at FTII, Pune for many years, and during his career as a music composer he worked for 40 films, and is most known for his work in films such as Amol Palekar's Aakreit and Thoda Sa Rumani Ho Jaayen, Girish Karnad's Ondanondu Kaladalli, Jabbar Patel's Samna, Mrinal Sen's Khandhar, Vijaya Mehta's Rao Saheb, Chitra Palekar's Maati Maay and K. G. George's Swapnadanam.

He gave music to films which are considered classics in their respective languages, like: Vamsha Vriksha (1971), Ondanondu Kaladalli (1978) in Kannada, Maya Darpan (1972), Khandhar (1984) in Hindi, Swapnadanam (1975) in Malayalam, Paroma (1984) in Bengali, Maya Miriga (1984) in Oriya, Shwaas (2004) in Marathi, etc.

He received the President's National Film Award for Music direction in the Marathi short film Chaitra directed by Kranti Kanade in 2002.

== Early life and education ==
Born and brought up in Pune, he completed his graduation from Wadia College, in Pune and studied contemporary music. He also studied at Fergusson College, Pune.

In late 1950s he studied under sitar player Pandit Ravi Shankar, and Umashankar Misra, and also learnt Indian classical vocals. He also studied contemporary Western music and jazz.

== Career ==
He remained a part of the faculty at the Film and Television Institute of India (FTII), as a resident composer and teacher of applied music, from 1965 to 1980. He worked with Merzbow, Sonic Youth and Throbbing Gristle and was a big fan of experimental and noise music.

While still at FTII, he composed the music of the acclaimed Marathi play Ghashiram Kotwal written by Vijay Tendulkar and directed by Jabbar Patel in 1972 and received critical acclaim for its use of Marathi devotional songs to ironic situations, later he also gave music for its Marathi feature film adaptation in 1974, and went on to compose for Marathi, Hindi, Kannada and Malayalam language cinema and stage with his blend Indian classical and Western music. He also received acclaim for his music for P. L. Deshpande's Marathi play Teen Paishacha Tamasha.

He died on 26 July 2009 in Pune, after a prolonged illness and was survived by his wife, Meena, director of New India School, and son Rohit. The Yard Went on Forever was his multi-volume autobiography published in 2008.

== Filmography ==
- Vamsha Vriksha (1971) – Kannada
- Jai Jawan Jai Makan (1971)
- Maya Darpan (1972)
- Jadu Ka Shankh (1974)
- Samna (1974)
- Bhakta Pundalik (1975)
- Swapnadanam (1976) – Malayalam
- Ghashiram Kotwal (1976)
- Tabbaliyu Neenade Magane (1977) – Kannada
- Sarvasaakshi (1978)
- Chandoba Chandoba Bhaglas Ka (1978)
- Ondanondu Kaladalli (1978) – Kannada
- Arvind Desai Ki Ajeeb Dastaan (1978)
- Albert Pinto Ko Gussa Kyon Ata Hai (1980)
- Garambicha Bapu (1980)
- Akriet (1981)
- Ek Daav Bhutacha (1982)
- Paroma (1984)
- Maya Miriga (1984)
- Khandhar (1984)
- Rao Saheb (1985)
- Thodasa Roomani Ho Jaayen (1990)
- Cheluvi (1992)
- Kairee (2000)
- Chaitra (2002)
- Shwaas (2004)
- Sarivar Sari (2005)
- Maati Maay (2006)

== Awards ==
- 1975: Kerala State Film Award for Best Music Director: Swapnadanam (Malayalam)
- 1988: Sangeet Natak Akademi Award
- 2002: National Film Award for Best Non-Feature Film Music Direction: Chaitra (Marathi)
