= Madan Deodhar =

Indian actor

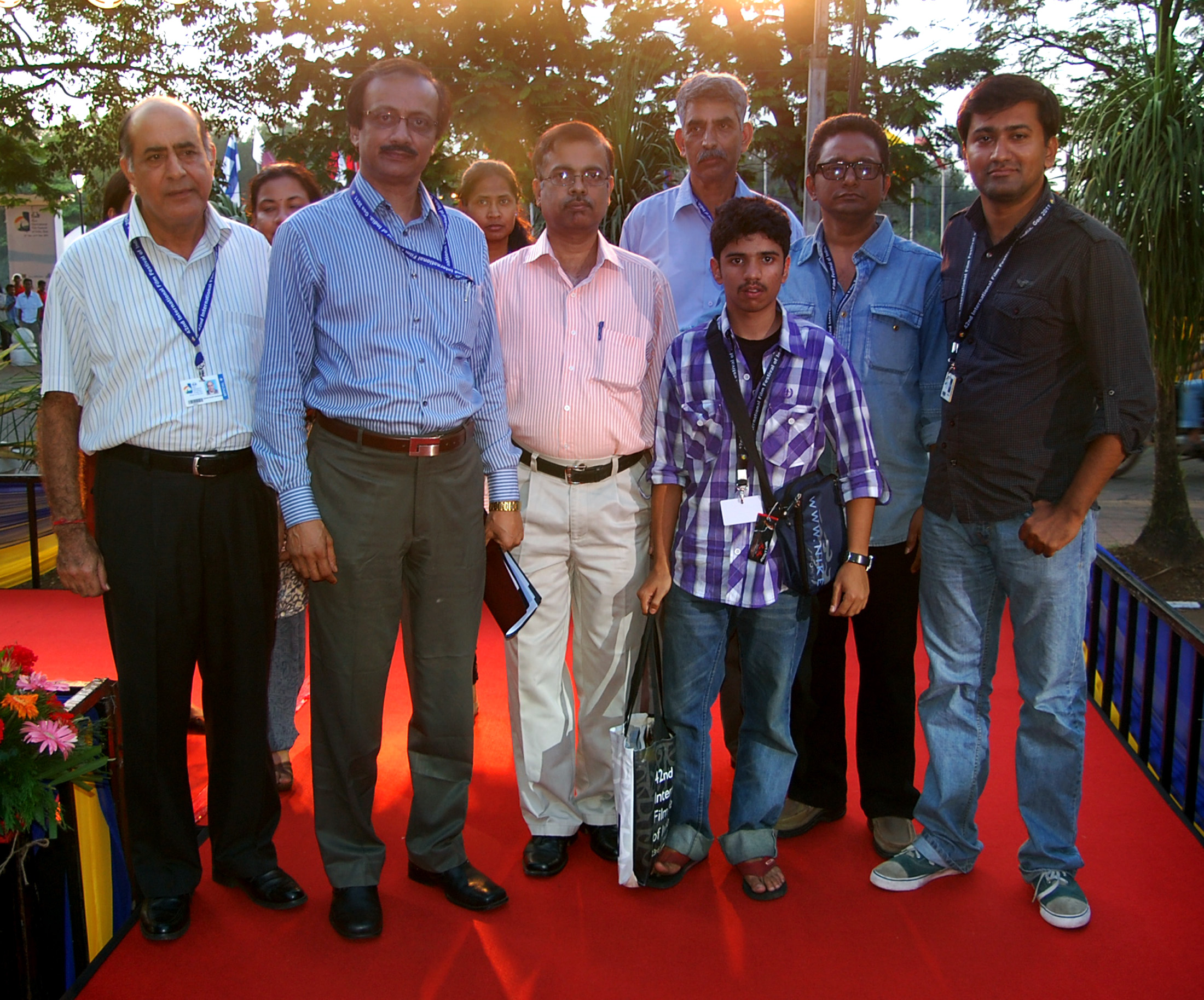
- Madan Deodhar, IFFI (2011)
- Born: Pune
- Education: Brihan Maharashtra College of Commerce
- Occupation: Actor
- Years active: 2007–present

Madan Deodhar is an Indian actor prominently featuring in Marathi films.

== Career ==
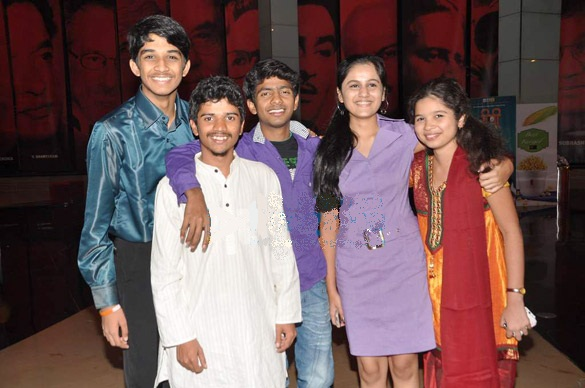
Deodhar (second from left) with the co-actors of the film Balak Palak

Deodhar started his acting career as a child actor in the Hindi film Mahek (2007), a coming-of-age film directed by Kranti Kanade. The film won Best Feature Film Award at Arpa International Film Festival. In 2009 he went on to play the lead role in the Marathi film Vihir. Deodhar portrayed the character of a school going swimmer Sameer who is very close to his cousin Nachiket (played by Alok Rajwade). Nachiket dies by drowning in a well and shocked Sameer sets on a journey to find meaning to life. The film received multiple awards and Deodhar's performance was also appreciated. Film's review in IBN Live called Deodhar and Rajwade's work as "outstanding" and credits them for the film's success. In 2010, he played the childhood role of actor Sharman Joshi in the Hindi film Allah Ke Banday. In 2012, he also appeared in a Bhojpuri film He about a slum boy who gets a chance to work in films. At the time of filming of He, he was a first year student at Brihan Maharashtra College of Commerce in Pune. In 2013, the Marathi film Balak Palak had him play one of the lead roles. He also featured in a commercial of Idea Cellular's 'No Ullu Banaoing' campaign in 2014. In 2019 he played the role of Maratha Captain in the hindi movie Laal Kaptaan.

== Filmography ==
=== Films ===
Year	Title	Role	Language
2007	Dus Kahaniyaan		Hindi
2007	Mahek	Amit	Hindi
2009	Vihir	Sameer	Marathi
2010	Allah Ke Banday	Vijay	Hindi
2012	HE...	Hari	Bhojpuri
2013	Balak-Palak	Bhagya	Marathi
2014	Happy Journey	14 year old Niranjan	Marathi
2016	Phuntroo		Marathi
2017	Nude	Lahanya	Marathi
2019	Laal Kaptaan	Maratha Captain	Hindi
2026	Paro Pinaki Ki Kahani	Ramdas	Hindi

=== Television ===
Year	Title	Role	Language
2017-2018	Hum To Tere Aashiq Hai	Mangesh (Monty)	Marathi
2018-2019	Julta Julta Jultay Ki	Vijay	Marathi
