= National Film Award for Best Music Direction (non-feature film) =

Indian film award

- National award for contributions to non-feature film
- Sponsored by: National Film Development Corporation of India
- Rewards: Rajat Kamal (Silver Lotus); ₹2,00,000
- First award: 1993
- Most recent winner: Pranil Desai, The First Film (2023)

The National Film Award for Best Music Direction is one of the National Film Awards presented annually by the National Film Development Corporation of India. It is one of several awards presented for non-feature films and awarded with Rajat Kamal (Silver Lotus).

The award was instituted in 1993, at 41st National Film Awards and awarded annually for films produced in the year across the country, in all Indian languages.

== Winners ==
Award includes 'Rajat Kamal' (Silver Lotus) and cash prize. Following are the award winners over the years:

List of award recipients, showing the year (award ceremony), film(s) and language(s)
Year	Recipient(s)	Film(s)	Language(s)	Refs.
1993 (41st)	Rajat Dholakia	Sunday	Hindi	
1994 (42nd)	K. P. Udayabhanu	The Myth to the Tree, The Serpent and The Mother	Malayalam	
1995 (43rd)	Shubha Mudgal	Amrit Beeja	English and Kannada	
1996 (44th)	No Award			
1997 (45th)	No Award			
1998 (46th)	Biswadeb Dasgupta	A Painter of Eloquent Silence: Ganesh Pyne	English	
1999 (47th)	No Award			
2000 (48th)	Usha Khanna	Ajeeb Ghar	Hindi	
2001 (49th)	Bhaskar Chandavarkar	Chaitra	Marathi	
2002 (50th)	Raja Mitra	Kalighat Paintings And Drawings	English	
2003 (51st)	Julius Packiam	Fiddlers on the Thatch	English	
2004 (52nd)	Dhwani	Ek Sagar Kinaree... A Seaside Story	Marathi and English	
2005 (53rd)	No Award			
2006 (54th)	Ramakant Gundecha	Raga of River Narmada	Music Only	
2006 (54th)	Umakant Gundecha	Raga of River Narmada	Music Only	
2007 (55th)	Zubeen Garg	Echoes of Silence	English and Khasi	
2008 (56th)	Vipin Mishra	Narmeen	Hindi and Punjabi	
2009 (57th)	No Award			
2010 (58th)	No Award			
2011 (59th)	Dhruba Jyoti Phukan	Panchakki	Hindi	
2012 (60th)	No Award			
2013 (61st)	Anuraag Saikia	Yugadrashta	Assamese	
2014 (62nd)	No Award			
2015 (63rd)	Aravind–Shankar	A Far Afternoon: A Painted Saga	Hindi and English	
2016 (64th)	Tanuj Tiku	Leeches		
2017 (65th)	Ramesh Narayanan	Shored of Liberty		
2018 (66th)	Kedar Divekar	Jyoti		
2019 (67th)	Bishakh Jyoti	Kranti Darshi Guruji – Ahead of Times	Hindi	
2020 (68th)	Vishal Bhardwaj	1232 KMS	Hindi	
2021 (69th)	Ishaan Divecha	Succulent	Hindi, English and Marathi	
2022 (70th)	Vishal Bhardwaj	Fursat	Hindi	
2023 (71st)	Pranil Desai	The First Film	Hindi	
2024 (72nd)	Shivpal Singh Kang	Parat 41°chya Magavar	Marathi	
