= Mahek (film) =

2007 film by Kranti Kanade

- Directed by: Kranti Kanade
- Written by: Kranti Kanade; Kedar Dharwadkar
- Produced by: Children's Film Society, India
- Starring: Shreya Sharma; Madan Deodhar; Anuya Bhagwat; Lalan Sarang; Anuja Borkar; Dhiresh Joshi
- Cinematography: Mrinal Desai
- Edited by: Suchitra Sathe
- Music by: Mathieu Lamboley
- Release date: 28 October 2007
- Running time: 80min
- Country: India
- Languages: Hindi; English

Mahek is an Indian children's film by writer-director Kranti Kanade.

== Plot ==
11-yr old Mahek dreams of becoming the very best at everything, but is unsure of how to achieve her goals. To complicate things further, an old magic-less modern fairy walks into her life.

== Release ==
It premiered at the BFI London Film Festival to affectionate reviews. Invited to over twenty International film festivals including Chicago, Munich, Toronto, St Louis and Cleveland, it won awards in Hollywood and Houston. It was Best Children's film nominee at the Asia Pacific Screen Awards, Australia and was shown as part of "Modern India" studies syllabus at the Otterbein University.

== Reviews ==
This film received positive with British Film Institute terming it as "An inspiring family film from India". The Sprockets Toronto Film Festival noted that "The film celebrates imagination, self-confidence and perseverance." One of India's most respected critics Maithili Rao, in the Frontline (magazine) said that the film was "A rare combination of sensitivity and gentle humour". Similarly, Rachel Dwyer, University of London termed the film as "Totally delightful". Cleveland Film Festival, USA noted it a "Gem of a film". St.Louis Film Festival, USA described Mahek as a "Beautifully filmed with a nice eye for color and very funny", whereas the Syracuse New Times, New York applauded that the film "Certainly matches Truffaut’s cinematic spirit."

Mahek has been included in the curriculum of Otterbein College, one of the oldest universities in the US.

- Outlook - A new filmmaker on the horizon
- Indian Express - Imagery of childhood
- Mahek's first screening in India
- Interview with Kranti Kanade
- Indian children's film win accolades in Houston
