= Rao Saheb (film) =

- Directed by: Vijaya Mehta
- Written by: Vijaya Mehta; Anil Chaudhary
- Based on: Andharachya Parambya by Jaywant Dalvi
- Produced by: Vinay Welling
- Cinematography: Adeep Tandon
- Edited by: Suresh Avdhoot
- Music by: Bhaskar Chandavarkar
- Release date: 1985
- Running time: 123 minutes
- Country: India
- Language: Hindi

Rao Saheb is a 1985 Hindi period drama film directed by Vijaya Mehta, a noted theatre director. It is based on a Marathi novel Andharachya Parambya by Jaywant Dalvi, on which he also wrote the play Barrister. The film set in small rural town in Maharashtra in early 19th century, and deals with clash of progressives and orthodox traditions, while depicting plight of women especially widows in traditional Indian society under feudalism and oppressive patriarchy. The film starred Anupam Kher, Vijaya Mehta, Nilu Phule, and Tanvi Azmi.

At the 33rd National Film Awards for 1985 films, the film won two awards; Best Supporting Actress for Vijaya Mehta, while Sham Bhutkar won the award for Best Art Direction.

== Synopsis ==
A young barrister, Rao Saheb, returns from England after his education, and brings progressive ideas back with him. In other words, he is enamored of western ways and customs and conditioned to regard his own society as backward and repressive. He returns to his childhood home, a large mansion in small-town Maharashtra, where life goes on as placidly as it always has, quite unmoved by western ways or the officious efforts of modernists to bring about a social revolution. Rao Saheb's father is a conventional man who holds dear the values of his Brahmin caste: education, religion, tradition, austerity (frugality) and self-denial in personal life. His great tryst with modernity was to send his son, at very great expense, to England for higher education. His sister, who keeps house for him, is a childless widow of even greater orthodoxy. Mausi ("auntie"), played by Vijaya Mehta herself, is the vanguard of Brahminism at the start of the film. Radhika, a young widow who lives in a neighbouring home, is a great friend and protégée of the elderly widow. In Radhika, auntie sees the picture of her own lonely youth as a young widow, and the prospect of a lonely old age. Radhika however is inclined to rebel against the customs of austerity and self-denial which were expected of Brahmin widows at the time. Auntie, she of the unshakable orthodoxy, is torn within herself when she finds that her nephew is growing alarmingly close to the nubile young widow. As Rao Saheb begins to get closer to Radhika, empathizes with her and comes close to her, Mausi ends up as a champion of modernity and a denouncer of Brahminical values such as austerity, self-denial and the strictures of religion or tradition.

== Cast ==
- Anupam Kher as Rao saheb
- Vijaya Mehta as Mausi
- Nilu Phule
- Tanvi Azmi as Radhika
- Arvind Gadgil
- Chandrakant Gokhale
- Vasant Ingle
- Mangesh Kulkarni
