= G. A. Kulkarni =

Indian writer (1923–1987)

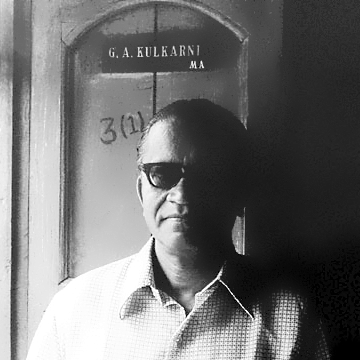
- Born: 10 July 1923; Examba, Karnataka (aka Ek Samba / Ek Sambe)
- Died: 11 December 1987 (aged 64); Pune, Maharashtra, India
- Occupations: Author and professor
- Writing career
- Language: Marathi
- Genres: Short stories, translations
- Notable works: KaajalMaya, RamalKhuna SanjShakun, PingalaVel
- Notable awards: Sahitya Akademi Award (1973)
- Movement: Nav-katha in Marathi Literature

G. A. Kulkarni (Gurunath Abaji Kulkarni), or known simply as "GA" (10 July 1923 – 11 December 1987), was an Indian Sahitya Akademi Award winner Marathi writer of short stories.

GA grew up in Belgaum. After earning his master's degree, he taught English at JSS College in Dharwad for about 30 years. He had very strong liking for Dharwad and Belgaum. For medical treatment of his eyes, he reluctantly moved to Pune in 1985. A major road in the Kothrud area of Pune, where GA lived for couple of years before his death, has been named after him

GA created a world of his own in his short stories where his characters are in pursuit of the unknowable destiny. A dark mode reflects the inscrutable ways in which destiny shadows his characters. His use of symbolism, allegory and irony provides his stories a unique texture and ethos. His world encompasses a wide diversity of locales, situations, characters and experiences; yet, in his earlier stories, it is demarcated by the region bordering Maharashtra and Karnataka. The mythic, allegorical experiences make it difficult to sort out the realities from the dreams, themes, and meditations. Yet, it is possible for the reader to identify with his characters, places, and experiences because of his keen observation of human, animal, and social worlds in their beauty and deformity.

Critics observe that characters in GA's world are multifaceted, but they are not independent. They lead their lives as if they are puppets guided by an unseen hand and are unable to change the direction. Why they follow that path to their demise or why they cannot change it by their volition is not known. In that sense, his work is a reversal of direction fostered by the modernist short story in Marathi. GA's earlier short stories depicted the tragic and cruel aspects of the human situation. His later works were almost Kafkaesque, without Kafka-like black humour. Some of his later works were allegorical and reminiscent of Borges.

Some of GA's short stories have been translated into English, Hindi, and Kannada. He was honoured in 1973 with a Sahitya Akademi Award for his collection of short stories Kajalmaya. Critically acclaimed Marathi movie Kairee, which was directed by Amol Palekar, was based on one of his short stories. Based on GA's short story, Director Kranti Kanade made short film Chaitra that went on to win five National Film Awards in 2002.

GA was a prolific correspondent. Though he had an obsession to keep his life private, he also longed to reach out through letters to his friends who shared his tastes. Four volumes of his letters were published after his death. He had written many of those letters to "Shri Pu" Bhagwat, Sunita Deshpande, Madhav Achawal, Jaywant Dalvi, Anantrao Kulkarni, and "Ma Da" Hatkanangalekar.

GA translated five novels by Conrad Richter into Marathi in the 1960s for a project which USIS in India had initiated for getting some prominent American writings translated into Indian languages. He also wrote the book Manase Arbhat Ani Chillar, which contains seemingly autobiographical musings.

He translated Nobel laureate William Golding’s work “Lord of the Flies” to Marathi. William Golding had personally come for the ceremony of publication of GA’s Marathi translation.

== Works ==
- Nilasavala (निळासावळा) (1959)
- Hirave Rave (हिरवे रावे) (1960)
- Parava (पारवा) (1960)
- RaktaChandan (रक्तचंदन) (1966)
- Kajalmaya (काजळमाया) (1972)
- Pingalavel (पिंगळावेळ)
- Sanjshakun (सांजशकुन) (1975)
- Ramalkhuna (रमलखुणा) (1975)
- Ek Arabi Kahani (एक अरबी कहाणी) (1983) (Translated)
- Onjaldhara (ओंजळधारा) (1984) (Translated)
- Bakhar Bimmachi (बखर बिम्मची) (1986) (for children)
- Mugdhachi Rangit Goshta (मुग्धाची रंगीत गोष्ट) (1986) (for children)
- Pailpakhare (पैलपाखरे) (1986) (Translated)
- Akashphule (आकाशफुले) (Translated)
- Manase Arbhat Ani Chillar (माणसे -अरभाट आणि चिल्लर) (1988)
- Kusumgunja (कुसुमगुंजा) (1989; posthumous)
- Sonpawale (सोनपावले) (1991; posthumous)
- Dohakalima (डोहकाळिमा) (1987) (Collection of stories from GA's first four books)
- Niyatidaan (नियतिदान) (1992; posthumous) (Collection of Hindi translation of GA's selected short stories)
- Raan (रान) (1967) (Translated; Original – The Trees by Conrad Richter)
- Gaav (गाव) (1967) (Translated; Original – The Town by Conrad Richter)
- Swatantrya Ale Ghara (स्वातंत्र्य आले घरा) (1968) (Translated; Original – The Free Man by Conrad Richter))
- Ranatil Prakash (रानातील प्रकाश) (1968) (Translated; Original – The Light in the Forest by Conrad Richter)
- Shiwaar (शिवार) (1968) (Translated; Original – The Fields by Conrad Richter)
- Sonyache Madake (सोन्याचे मडके) (1991; posthumous) (Translated, Original – Crock of Gold by James Stephens)
- Lord of the Flies (लॉर्ड ऑफ दी फ्लाईज) (1987) (Translated, Original – Lord of the Flies, By William Golding)
- Vairyachi Ek Ratra (वैऱ्याची एक रात्र) (1982) (Translated, Original – I Survived Hitler's Ovens by Olga Lengyel)
- Amrutphale (अमृतफळे) (1983) (Translated, Original – Apples of immortality by Leon Surmelian)
- G.A. -nchi Nivadak Patre – Khand I, II, III, IV (जी.एं. ची निवडक पत्रे; खंड १,२.३.४) (1995,1998, 2006; posthumous)
- G.A. -nchi PatraVela (जी.एं.ची पत्रवेळा; Letters to Kavi Grace and his daughter Mithila) (2010; posthumous)
- Diwas Tudawat Andharakade (दिवस तुडवत अंधाराकडे) (2015; posthumous) (Translated:1953, Original – Long Day's Journey into Night by Eugene O'Neill)
- A Journey Forever: Iskilaar and Other Stories (2015; posthumous) (Collection of English translation of GA's selected short stories like Iskilaar. Translator:Vilas Salunke)
- Shadows in the Desert: Vidooshak and Other Stories (2015; posthumous) (Collection of English translation of GA's selected short stories like Vidooshak. Translator:Vilas Salunke)
