= Ravi Raj Murmu =

Indian filmmaker from Jharkhand

- ᱨᱚᱵᱤ ᱨᱟᱡᱽ ᱢᱩᱨᱢᱩ
- President of India Smt Droupadi Murmu presents the 72nd National Film Award to Ravi Raj Murmu at a ceremony held in Ekta Nagar, Kevadia, Gujarat, on 22 September 2026
- Born: November 20, 1992 (age 33); Jamshedpur, Jharkhand, India
- Education: Film and Television Institute of India; Karim City College, Jamshedpur
- Occupations: Filmmaker, film editor
- Known for: Angen
- Awards: Best Debut Film of a Director

Ravi Raj Murmu (born 20 November 1992) is an Indian filmmaker and film editor from Jharkhand. He works primarily with Santali cinema and is known for directing the Santali short film Angen. In 2026, he received the National Film Award for Best Debut Film of a Director in the non-feature film category for Angen, at the 72nd National Film Awards.

== Early life and education ==
Murmu was born on 20 November 1992 in Jaduguda, in East Singhbhum district of Jharkhand, and grew up in a tribal family. He studied mass communication and video production at Karim City College in Jamshedpur. He subsequently studied film editing at the Film and Television Institute of India, Pune.

== Career ==
After completing his studies, Murmu worked as a film editor and creative editor in Mumbai. He has worked on projects associated with digital and advertising productions, including work connected with streaming platforms.

Murmu's filmmaking has focused on stories connected with Jharkhand and Santali culture. His short film Angen was selected for the National Competition section of the Mumbai International Film Festival in 2024, where it was listed as a Santali short fiction film directed by Ravi Raj Murmu, also credited as Bablu Murmu.

== National Film Award ==
At the 72nd National Film Awards, announced on 18 July 2026, Angen received the award for Best Debut Film of a Director in the non-feature film section, with Murmu credited as its director.

The award was presented to Murmu by President Droupadi Murmu at the 72nd National Film Awards ceremony held at Ekta Nagar, Gujarat, on 22 September 2026.

Angen was the first Santali-language film to receive a National Film Award. The recognition was also described by the Press Information Bureau as the first recognition of a Santali film in the non-feature film section of the National Film Awards.

== Filmography ==
Year	Title	Language	Role
2024	Angen	Santali	Director, writer
2026	Sundi	Santali	Director, writer, producer

== Awards and recognition ==
Year	Award	Category	Work
2026	National Film Award	Best Debut Film of a Director	Angen
