= CRD (film) =

2016 Indian romantic drama, directed by Kranti Kanade

- Directed by: Kranti Kanade
- Written by: Kranti Kanade; Dharmakirti Sumant
- Produced by: Eesha Thaker; Shakuntala Kanade; Kranti Kanade
- Starring: Mrinmayee Godbole; Vinay Sharma; Saurabh Saraswat; Abhay Mahajan; Isha Keskar; Geetika Tyagi; Mohit Takalkar
- Cinematography: Daniel Katz
- Edited by: Suchitra Sathe
- Music by: Garth Neustadter
- Production companies: Chaitra Arts; Kanade Films; Kumbhakarna Pictures
- Release dates: 4 November 2016 (Los Angeles); 29 September 2017 (India)
- Running time: 108 minutes
- Country: India
- Languages: Hindi & English

CRD is a 2016 drama-romance Indian film by National Award Winning Director Kranti Kanade written with Yuva Sahitya Akademi Award Winning Dramatist Dharmakirti Sumant. Set in the world of College Theatre, it probes fascism and fierce competition in arts.

== Cast ==
- Mrinmayee Godbole as Persis
- Vinay Sharma as Mayank
- Saurabh Saraswat as Chetan
- Abhay Mahajan as Netra
- Isha Keskar as Dipti
- Geetika Tyagi as Veena
- Mohit Takalkar as Senior

== Production ==
The preparation and improvisation of the actors went on for 4 months before the principal photography began in November 2014 and continued over the next six months resulting in 63 days of shooting. The editing took eight months and the music and sound design took further six months. The film was entirely shot on locations in Pune. It was executive and line produced by Ashwini Paranjape for Kanade Films and Chaitra Arts. Director of photography was Daniel Katz whose short film Curfew had won Oscar.

== Critical response ==
CRD has received favourable critical reception around the world.

Robert Abele in The Los Angeles Times says, "Indian film 'CRD' enchanting, audacious, indefinable and infectious." Sheri Linden in The Hollywood Reporter says, "CRD is entrancing, vibrant, irreverent and category-defying! Kanadé an assured visual stylist!" LA Weekly says, "Allusive, elusive and by turns funny, romantic and tragic, CRD is a film tuned to the pitch of the artist's heart." ScreenAnarchy says, "CRD, An Ethereal Exercise In Art.” Film critic Namrata Joshi, in The Hindu says, “Subversive and fearless, Kanadé breaks all rules of filmmaking in creating CRD, which boldly goes where no Indian film has gone before.” Saibal Chatterjee, NDTV says “A path-breaking film. Refreshingly original and delightfully whimsical. CRD is classy, satisfying and magnificently inventive package.” Nandini Ramnath, Scroll says “Outstanding, a superbly performed drama about theatre art and life." Trisha Gupta, Firstpost says “Masterful and sharp, CRD displays both political and aesthetic courage, constantly moving between lyrical intensity and playful subversion.” Rahul Desai, Film Companion says “CRD is hypnotic. The less sense it makes, the more we can’t stop watching it (Roger Ebert’s words apply here). May be this is what auteurs are about.” Reza Noorani in The Times of India says "CRD is brave with a twisted sense of humour." Hindustan Times says "CRD is vibrant and appealing." Shubhra Gupta in The Indian Express says "CRD is spectacular and refreshing in its willingness to go down paths less trodden." CRD is mentioned in Scroll's list of "The movies of the decade that dared to dream differently."
