= Madurai Sambavam =

2009 film by Youreka

- Poster
- Directed by: Youreka
- Written by: Youreka
- Produced by: Sunir Kheterpal; Suresh Balaje
- Starring: Harikumar; Anuya Bhagvath; Karthika
- Cinematography: M. Sukumar
- Edited by: P. Sai Suresh
- Music by: John Peter
- Production companies: Wide Angle Creations; Imagine Film Company
- Distributed by: Sri Thenandal Films
- Release date: 4 September 2009
- Country: India
- Language: Tamil

Madurai Sambavam (transl. The Madurai Incident) is a 2009 Tamil language crime action film written and directed by Youreka in his directorial debut. It stars Harikumar, Anuya Bhagvath and Karthika, while Radha Ravi, Kadhal Dhandapani, and Raj Kapoor play supporting roles. The music was composed by John Peter with cinematography by M. Sukumar and editing by P. Sai Suresh. The film was released on 4 September 2009, and did not perform well at the box office.

== Plot ==
Aalamarathaar is dreaded by his enemies in Aattuthotti in Madurai. He is involved in katta panchayathu but strives to do his best for the people in the neighborhood, and everyone respects him. Aalamaran is assisted by his son Azhagar aka Kutty and his son-in-law. Gomathi is Kutty's niece who loves him madly, which he does not reciprocate. Local MP Cutout Ganesan and Assistant Commissioner R. Subramaniam are both keen to bump off Aalamaran and Kutty. Kutty falls in love with a female cop named Caroline Thomas. However, it is revealed that she uses him only to shoot down Aalamaran, whom she eventually kills. When Kutty discovers Caroline's evil nature, he plays along with her for the right time to take revenge. One night, Caroline invites Kutty to her house and seduces him to make him stop underworld crimes for her. He refuses, but they end up making love. After the sex, the next morning, when Caroline comes to her senses and realizes her mistake, she attempts to shoot Kutty, but he kills her and tells her that he knows all her plans.

== Cast ==
- Harikumar as Azhagar aka Kutty
- Anuya Bhagvath as Caroline Thomas
- Karthika as Gomathi
- Radha Ravi as Aalamarathaar, Kutty's father
- Kadhal Dhandapani as MP Cutout Ganesan
- Raj Kapoor as Assistant Commissioner R. Subramanian
- Santhana Bharathi as Thomas, Caroline's father
- Ponnambalam as MLA
- Anand Babu as Henchman
- Balu Anand
- Nandha Saravanan
- Vinayakan as Anand aka Mandaiyan (uncredited)

== Soundtrack ==
Soundtrack was composed by John Peter.

Track listing
No.	Title	Singer(s)	Length
1.	"Vaigai Aatril"	Sriram, Nithyasree
2.	"Oru Ilavum Panju"	Harish Raghavendra, Sadhana Sargam
3.	"Landhu Kuduppom"	Shankar Mahadevan
4.	"Kulathil"	Chinmayi, Hariharan
5.	"Kannazhaga"	Anuradha Sriram

== Critical reception ==
The Hindu wrote, "Enough action and good performances are provided by the lead pair and Radha Ravi not to mention a nice cameo by Anand Babu but director Eureka has not made full use of these aspects, the climax proving a spoilsport." Deccan Herald wrote, "Madurai Sambavam is not a pious flick for devout. Instead, ‘Madurai...’ is a mundane masala film. The lyricist-turned-director proffers an unapologetic hotch-potch cauldron aimed at B & C class who are sure to have a whale of a time hooting and whistling at gay abandon". Ananda Vikatan wrote that the build-up scenes of the hero uprooting the servant and the palm tree in one fell swoop, if the masala smell had been reduced, would have been an unforgettable incident.
