= Jaywant Dalvi =

Indian writer (1925-1994)

Jaywant Dalvi (14 August 1925 – 16 September 1994) was a prominent contemporary Marathi writer in Maharashtra.

Originally from Arawali, Sindhudurg district Maharashtra. He worked as an assistant editor at Marathi newspapers Prabhāt and Lokmānya, and later with USIS. As part of USIS efforts to make good English literature available in other languages, Dalvi selected texts and able translators, and helped the cause. He took an early retirement to concentrate on writing novels.

He is best remembered for his dramas, and a humorous column on Marathi literary personalities which he wrote under the pseudonym: ThanthanpaaL. Jaywant Dalvi had a long time friendly relations with noted Marathi literary couple Pu La Deshpande and Sunita Deshpande.

== Writings ==
Dalvi wrote fiction, plays, and screenplays for Marathi and Hindi movies. Cartoonist Vasant Sarwate often illustrated Dalvi's satiric writings.

=== Books ===
  - Sparsh (kathasangrah)
  - Kawadase
  - Pradakshinā
  - Mahānanda
  - Abhinetā
  - Ātmacharitrā-aiwaji
  - Alaane Falaane
  - Adhāntari
  - Andhārāchyā Pārambyā
  - Chakra
  - Ghar Kaulāru
  - Sohalā
  - Wirangulā
  - Niwadak Thanthanpāl
  - Sāyankālchyā Sāvlyā
  - Utarwāt
  - Lok Āni Laukik
  - Bājār
  - Dharmānand
  - Param-Mitra
  - Apoornānka
  - Ālbum
  - Bāki Shillak
  - Mālawani Saubhadrā
  - Don Kadambarya: Savalya ani Pravah
  - Sāre Prawāsi Ghadiche
  - Swagat
  - Best of Jayawant Dalvi (Compilation of Dalvi's choice work by Subhash Bhende)
  - Jaywant Dalvi's autobiography in Marathi has been translated into English as Leaves of Life by Prabhakar Lad.

=== Plays ===
- Purush
  - This play is about a woman's victory over male chauvinism. The play was a high success, Nana Patekar and Reema Lagoo having acted in the leading roles. Patekar acted in over 1,600 presentations of this play. Vijaya Mehta directed a Hindi version of Purush. For a while, Patekar acted in the Hindi version too (along with Ayesha Julka). Ashutosh Rana later replaced Patekar.
- Nāti-Goti
  - This play is about a lower middle-class couple's struggle to adapt their lives around the needs of their intellectually disabled son. For his leading role in this play, Dilip Prabhavalkar received Nātyadarpan Award for Best Actor in a Serious Role in 1989. Ashok Sharma created a Hindi version of this play as 'Rishte-Nate'.
- Sandhyā Chhāyā
  - This play deals with the problems of elderly people in India in modern times.
- Sooryāsta
  - Nilu Phule acted in this play in the main role of a disillusioned freedom fighter.
- Barrister
  - This play portrays the conflict between the traditional and the radical segments of Marathi Brahmin society in the first quarter of the twentieth century. The play was based on Dalvi's own novel, Andhārāchyā Pārambyā
- Sabhya Gruhastaho
- Mahāsāgar
- Paryay

=== Movies ===
- Chakra (1981)
  - This movie's plot deals with a person's search for security and small pleasures of life. Smita Patil and Naseeruddin Shah acted in the leading roles in this movie.
- Rao Saheb (1985)
  - Dalvi adapted the plot of this movie from his own play, Barrister. Vijaya Mehta directed the movie, Anupam Kher and Vijaya Mehta having acted in the leading roles.
- Uttarayan (2005)
  - The plot of this movie was based on Dalvi's play, Durgi. It is about a couple which is currently in its sixties and which had remained mutually mentally distant through its earlier married life, and had recently, newly found happiness in their marriage. Bipin Nadkarni was the producer, director, and screenplay writer of the movie, Shivaji Satam and Neena Kulkarni having acted in the leading roles. The National Awards committee had voted this movie as the Best Marathi Movie in the year of its release.
- KAVADASE - (2005)
  - The plot of this movie is based on his novel kavadase. It is about a lower-middle-class family's struggle for survival, the period is in the late fifties. And tragic tale of its protagonist Janardan. This movie has got many nominations, and Amruta Subhas got the best actress award for 'Zee Gaurav' and 'Screen award'. The cast: Dilip Prabhavalkar, Neena Kulkarni, Subodh Bhave, Amruta Subhash, and Makrand Anaspure in a remarkable role. This film was directed by Raju Firke. Great literary Vijay Tendulkar has praised Mr. Prabhavalkar's role in this movie as the best work seen from Dilip Prabhavalkar.
