= Anuya Y Bhagwat =

Indian actress

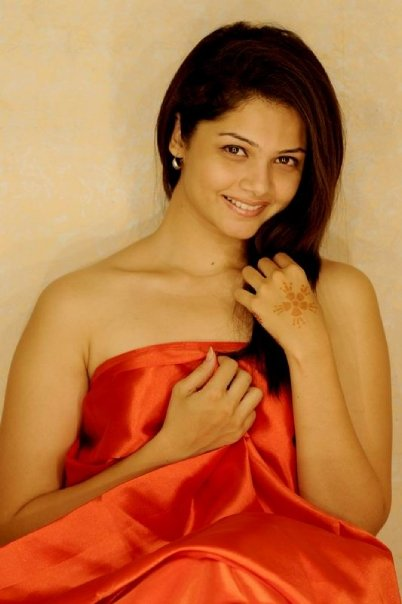
- Born: Anuya Y Bhagwat; 6 September 1989 (age 37); Dubai, United Arab Emirates
- Other name: Sakthi
- Citizenship: India
- Occupations: Actress; model
- Years active: 2007-present

Anuya Y Bhagwat is an Indian actress who works predominantly in Tamil, Hindi and Bengali films. She is best known for her role in Siva Manasula Sakthi (2009). She is an alumna of St Anne's High School, Pune, PVG's COET, Ferguson Pune, Film and Television Institute of India, Acting, She is a B.E(electrical) from PVG's COET with a 1st class. She has also been an external expert for FTII acting course admissions

== Film career ==
Anuya Y Bhagwat debuted in the Hindi children's film Mahek, directed by Kranti Kanade. The film premiered at the London Film Festival and was critically acclaimed, gaining nominations in various categories including Best Picture at the WorldFest-Houston International Film Festival. Anuya"s breakthrough came in her next film, Siva Manasula Sakthi (2009), a romantic comedy film directed by Rajesh, which featured her in a title role alongside Jiiva. Before the film's release, she narrowly escaped from a terror attack while she was staying at a hotel in Mumbai.

Anuya next worked on a film titled Madurai Sambavam (2009) directed by Youreka, which was made on a small budget and set against the backdrop of Madurai. A reviewer from Sify wrote, "Anuya, in a deglamorised role as the fiendish cop who falls for the rowdy is fantastic. She brings so much emotion and reality to her performance and is an actress of substance". This helped her fetch a role in the film Nagaram opposite Sundar C, and further smaller roles in Vijay Antony's Naan (2012) and a promotional song in Nanjupuram (2011). After making a cameo appearance in S. Shankar's Nanban, she said that she will not be doing any such roles in future. Anuya then briefly worked in Bengali films and made a debut in a film titled Gora, based on a novel of the same name by Rabindranath Tagore. She later featured in the Doordarshan TV series, Ek Tha Rusty (2014), playing Maharani.

Later in 2017, Anuya participated in the first season of Bigg Boss Tamil, but was the first contestant to be evicted. She later claimed that her inability to speak Tamil fluently meant that other contestants were less accepting of her presence in the show.

== Filmography ==
Year	Film	Role	Language	Notes
2007	Mahek	Mahek's Class Teacher	Hindi	
2009	Siva Manasula Sakthi	Sakthi	Tamil	Nominated, Vijay Award for Best Debut Actress
2009	Madurai Sambavam	Caroline Thomas	Tamil	
2010	Nagaram	Bharathi	Tamil	
2011	Nanjupuram	Herself	Tamil	Special appearance in a promotional song
2012	Nanban	Shwetha Santhanam	Tamil	
2012	Naan	Priya	Tamil	
2014	Gora	Lolita	Hindi	
2014	C.D. Kand	Reporter Mansi Rana	Hindi	

== Television ==
Year	Series/show	Role	Channel	Notes
2009-2010	Kasturi Kundal Basey	Maitreyi	Doordarshan	TV series
2013 onwards	Crime Patrol	Many roles	Sony	
2014-2015	Ek Tha Rusty (season 3)	Maharani	Doordarshan	TV series
2015-2016	Siya Ke Ram	Mrityudevi	StarPlus	TV series
2017	Bigg Boss Tamil 1	Contestant	Star Vijay	Evicted on Day 7
2018	Savdhaan India	Many roles	Star Bharat	TV series

Short Films & Teleseries

1. Moksh
2. Taza Kalam
3. Gora
4. Kasturi kundal Basey
