= National Film Award for Best Actress in a Supporting Role =

Indian film award

- National award for contributions to Indian cinema
- Awarded for: Best performance by an actress in a supporting role
- Sponsored by: National Film Development Corporation of India
- Formerly called: National Film Award for Best Supporting Actress (1984–2021)
- Rewards: Rajat Kamal (Silver Lotus); ₹2,00,000
- First award: 1984
- Most recent winner: Sachana Namidass, Maharaja and; Roopashree Varkady, Mithya; (2024)

The National Film Award for Best Actress in a Supporting Role is an honour presented annually at India's National Film Awards ceremony by the National Film Development Corporation of India (NFDC), an organisation set up by the Indian Ministry of Information and Broadcasting. Since 1984, the award is given by a national panel appointed annually by the NFDC to an actress for the best performance in a supporting role within Indian cinema. It is presented by the President of India at a ceremony held in New Delhi. Since the 70th National Film Awards, the name was changed to "Best Actress in a Supporting Role".

The winner is given a "Rajat Kamal" (Silver Lotus) certificate and a cash prize of ₹2,00,000. (Note: The cash prize was ₹50,000, from 54th National Film Awards (2006) until 69th National Film Awards (2021). Before the 54th National Film Awards (2006), the cash prize was ₹10,000 (US$110).) Including ties and repeat winners, the NFDC has presented a total of 41 Best Supporting Actress awards to 35 different actresses. Although Indian cinema produces films in more than 20 languages, the performances of films that have won awards are of 11 languages: Hindi (20 awards), Malayalam (8 awards), Bengali (4 awards), Tamil (4 awards), English (2 awards), Gujarati (1 award), Haryanvi (1 award), Marathi (1 award), Meitei (1 award), Odia (1 award) and Urdu (1 award).

The first recipient was Rohini Hattangadi, who was honoured at the 32nd National Film Awards for her performance in the Hindi film Party (1984). As of 2023 edition, Surekha Sikri has been honoured thrice for her Hindi films – Tamas (1987), Mammo (1994) and Badhaai Ho (2018). K. P. A. C. Lalitha won the award two times for her work in the Malayalam films Amaram (1990) and Shantham (2000) along with Pallavi Joshi for her work in Hindi films The Tashkent Files (2019) and The Kashmir Files (2021) and Urvashi for her works in Malayalam films Achuvinte Amma (2005) and Ullozhukku (2023). Egyptian actress Aida El-Kashef, who was honoured at the 61st National Film Awards for her performance in the English-Hindi film Ship of Theseus (2013) is the only non-Indian actress to win the award. Urvashi and Kalpana are the only siblings to receive the honour. Ties between two actresses have occurred in the years 1999, 2012, 2013 and 2023. Sharmila Tagore, Konkona Sen Sharma and Kangana Ranaut are the three actresses to receive honours in both acting categories: Best Actress and Best Supporting Actress.

== Recipients ==
Key

Symbol	Meaning
†	Indicates a joint award for that year

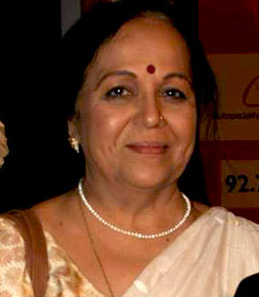
Rohini Hattangadi is the first-ever recipient of the Best Supporting Actress Award for her performance in Hindi film Party in 1984.

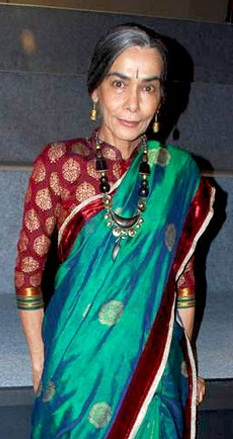
Surekha Sikri has been the most honoured (three times) actress in the category.

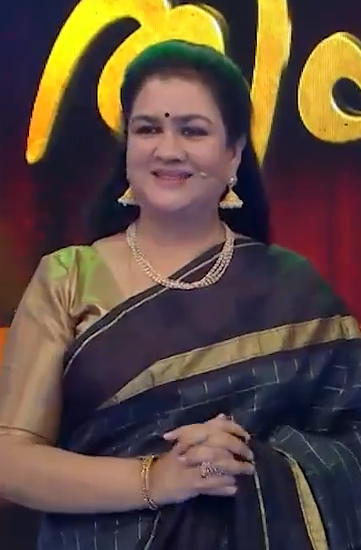
Urvashi has been honoured (two times) actress in the category.

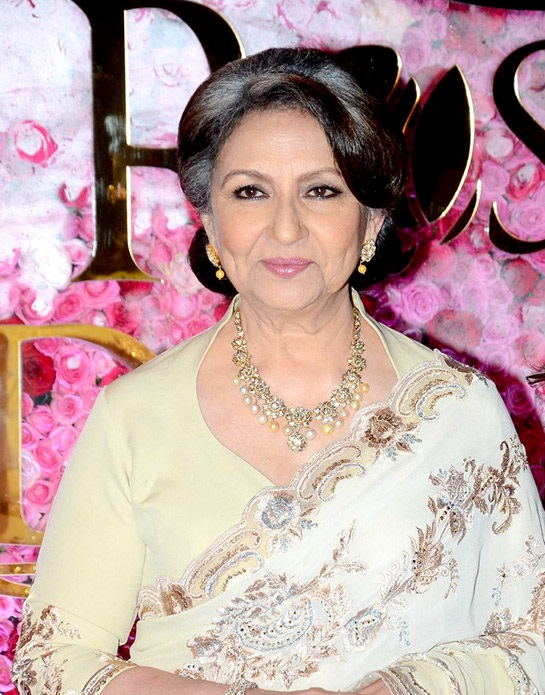
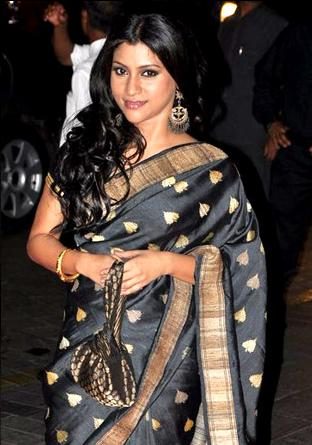
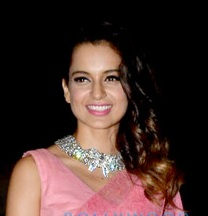
Sharmila Tagore (top), Konkona Sen Sharma (middle) and Kangana Ranaut (bottom) have received honours in both acting categories: Best Actress and Best Supporting Actress.

List of award recipients, showing the year, role, film and language(s).
Year (Note: Year in which the film was censored by the Central Board of Film Certification.)	Recipient	Role	Work	Language(s)	Ref. (Note: The reference cites the winner and the role played by them in the film. While there are some sources that are written in both English and Hindi, other references are entirely in Hindi.)
1984 (32nd)	Rohini Hattangadi	Mohini Barve	Party	Hindi	
1985 (33rd)	Vijaya Mehta	Mausi	Rao Saheb	Hindi	
1986 (34th)	Manjula Kanwar	Champa	Bhangala Silata	Odia	
1987 (35th)	Surekha Sikri	Rajo	Tamas	Hindi	
1988 (36th)	Uttara Baokar	Sudha	Ek Din Achanak	Hindi	
1989 (37th)	Manorama	Unknown	Pudhea Paadhai	Tamil	
1990 (38th)	K. P. A. C. Lalitha	Bhargavi	Amaram	Malayalam	
1991 (39th)	Santha Devi	Unknown	Yamanam	Malayalam	
1992 (40th)	Revathi	Panchavarnam	Thevar Magan	Tamil	
1993 (41st)	Neena Gupta	Geeta Devi	Woh Chokri	Hindi	
1994 (42nd)	Surekha Sikri	Fayyazi	Mammo	Hindi	
1995 (43rd)	Aranmula Ponnamma	Grandmother	Kathapurushan	Malayalam	
1996 (44th)	Rajeshwari Sachdev	Sakina	Sardari Begum	Urdu	
1997 (45th)	Karisma Kapoor	Nisha Sandhu	Dil To Pagal Hai	Hindi	
1998 (46th)	Suhasini Mulay	Maltibai Barve	Hu Tu Tu	Hindi	
1999 (47th) †	Sudipta Chakraborty	Malati	Bariwali	Bengali	
1999 (47th) †	Sohini Sengupta	Khuku	Paromitar Ek Din	Bengali	
2000 (48th)	K. P. A. C. Lalitha	Narayani	Shantham	Malayalam	
2001 (49th)	Ananya Khare	Deepa Pandey	Chandni Bar	Hindi	
2002 (50th)	Rakhee Gulzar	Ranga Pishima	Shubho Mahurat	Bengali	
2003 (51st)	Sharmila Tagore	Aparna	Abar Aranye	Bengali	
2004 (52nd)	Sheela	Margaret D'Costa	Akale	Malayalam	
2005 (53rd)	Urvashi	K. P. Vanaja	Achuvinte Amma	Malayalam	
2006 (54th)	Konkona Sen Sharma	Indu Tyagi	Omkara	Hindi	
2007 (55th)	Shefali Shah	Vandana	The Last Lear	English	
2008 (56th)	Kangana Ranaut	Shonali Gujral	Fashion	Hindi	
2009 (57th)	Arundathi Nag	Bhumi "Bum" Bhardwaj	Paa	Hindi	
2010 (58th)	Sukumari	Ammini Amma	Namma Gramam	Tamil	
2011 (59th)	Leishangthem Tonthoingambi Devi	Yaipabhee	Phijigee Mani	Meitei	
2012 (60th) †	Dolly Ahluwalia	Dolly Arora	Vicky Donor	Hindi	
2012 (60th) †	Kalpana	Razia Beevi	Thanichalla Njan	Malayalam	
2013 (61st) †	Amruta Subhash	Channamma	Astu	Marathi	
2013 (61st) †	Aida El-Kashef	Aliya Kamal	Ship of Theseus	English/Hindi	
2014 (62nd)	Baljinder Kaur	Unknown	Pagdi – The Honour	Haryanvi	
2015 (63rd)	Tanvi Azmi	Radhabai	Bajirao Mastani	Hindi	
2016 (64th)	Zaira Wasim	Young Geeta Phogat	Dangal	Hindi	
2017 (65th)	Divya Dutta	Ramadeep Braitch	Irada	Hindi	
2018 (66th)	Surekha Sikri	Durga Devi Kaushik ("Dadi")	Badhaai Ho	Hindi	
2019 (67th)	Pallavi Joshi	Ayisha Ali Shah	The Tashkent Files	Hindi	
2020 (68th)	Lakshmi Priyaa Chandramouli	Sivaranjini	Sivaranjiniyum Innum Sila Pengalum	Tamil	
2021 (69th)	Pallavi Joshi	Radhika Menon	The Kashmir Files	Hindi	
2022 (70th)	Neena Gupta	Shabina Siddiqui	Uunchai	Hindi	
2023 (71st) †	Janki Bodiwala	Aarya	Vash	Gujarati	
2023 (71st) †	Urvashi	Leelamma	Ullozhukku	Malayalam	
2024 (72nd) †	Sachana Namidass	Jothi	Maharaja	Tamil	
2024 (72nd) †	Roopashree Varkady	Jyothi	Mithya	Kannada	

== See also ==
- List of Indian film actresses
