= Water Baby (film) =

2016 short film

- Directed by: Pia Shah
- Produced by: Varun Shah
- Starring: Suhaas Ahuja
- Release date: 2016
- Country: India
- Language: Konkani

Water Baby is a 2016 short film directed by Pia Shah and produced by Varun Shah. It featured Suhaas Ahuja as lead character. The film had won a National Film Award for Best First Non-Feature Film at the 65th National Film Awards. The award was presented by President Ram Nath Kovind.

== Synopsis ==
The film is about a bullied boy battling his own hydrophobia.
