= Vasant Sarwate =

Indian cartoonist (1927–2016)

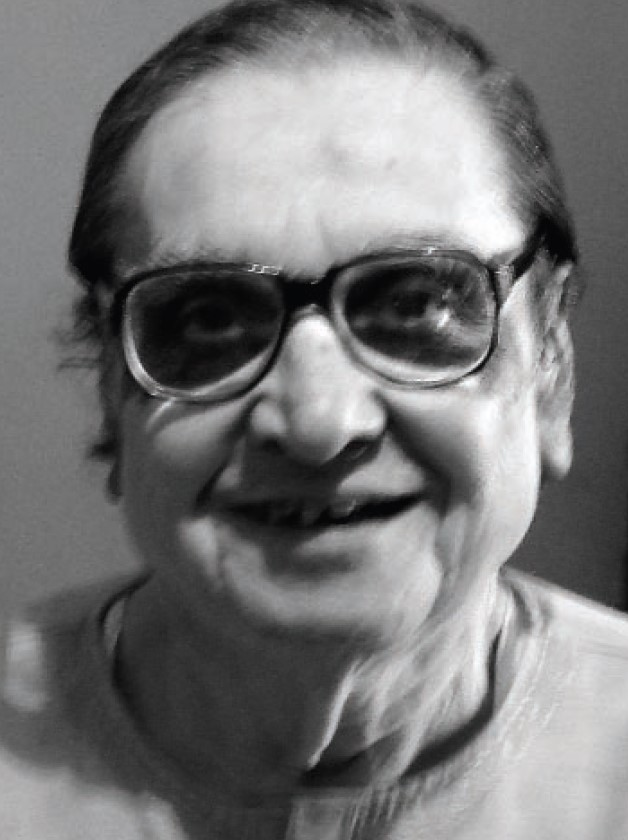
- Born: 3 February 1927; Kolhapur, Maharashtra, India
- Died: 24 December 2016 (aged 89); Mumbai, India
- Occupations: Cartoonist, Essayist, Civil Engineering
- Spouse: Sanjivanee
- Children: Anju, Manju, Satyajit
- Writing career
- Notable works: Vyangkala-Chitrakala, 2005 (in Marathi)

Vasant Sarwate (3 February 1927 – 24 December 2016) was an Indian cartoonist and writer who was published primarily in Marathi publications during his lifetime.

He was born in Kolhapur on 3 February 1927. He was a professional civil engineer, and worked at Associated Cement Companies for most of his working life.

He died in Mumbai on 24 December 2016.

== Artistry ==
Sarwate started drawing cartoons from the age of 17. He wrote a number of books on his art, and collections of his work. (See Authorship.)

Sarwate's art was partly inspired by the cartoons in The New Yorker, particularly those of Saul Steinberg.

Apart from cartoons, Sarwate illustrated books of many notable Marathi writers like P L Deshpande, Vijay Tendulkar and Vinda Karandikar.

He also illustrated satirist Jaywant Dalvi's monthly columns Thanthanpal for the Marathi magazine Lalit. He created covers of all Diwali issues of Lalit since its inception in 1965 to 2014.

He helped many young artists establish themselves in the world of cartoons.

He received a Lifetime Achievement Award from the Indian Institute of Cartoonists in May 2009.

Sarwate lived in Vile Parle, Mumbai.

== Authorship ==
- Samvad Reshalekhakashi, Mauj Prakashan, 2012 ISBN 978-81-7486-998-2
- Reshalekhak Vasant Sarwate, Rajhans Prakashan, 2009 ISBN 978-81-7434-441-0
- Sarwottam Sarwate, Lokawangmay Griha, 2008 ISBN 978-81-906150-6-8
- Khel Chalu Rahila Pahije!, Mauj Prakashan, 2004 ISBN 81-7486-381-8
- Khel Reshawatari, Mauj Prakashan, 2004 ISBN 81-7486-380-X
- Sawadhan! Pudhe Walan Ahe!, Mauj Prakashan, 1990 ISBN 81-7486-066-5
- Khada Marayacha Jhala Tar…!, Mauj Prakashan, 1963 ISBN 81-7486-282-X
- Wyang Chitra - Ek Samvad (jointly with Madhukar Dharmapurikar), Anubhav Prakashan, 2001
- Sahaprawasi, Majestic Prakashan, 2005
- Wyangkala - Chitrakala, Majestic Prakashan, 2005
- Parki Chalan, Majestic Prakashan, 1989
- Pu. La. : Ek Sathawan (Edited by Jaywant Dalvi; illustrations by Vasant Sarwate)
- Niwadak Thanthanpal - 1 & 2 (By Jaywant Dalvi; illustrations by Vasant Sarwate)

Thanthanpal

- Niwadak Marathi Wyangachitra (Edited by Prashant Kulkarni)
