= HE... =

2011 Bhojpuri Film By Mangesh Joshi

- Directed by: Mangesh Joshi
- Written by: Mangesh Joshi; Reza Nikbakhta; Rakesh Ojha
- Produced by: NDFC India
- Starring: Madan Deodhar; Rajendra Gupta; Shashank Shende
- Cinematography: Tapan Vyas
- Edited by: Suchitra Sathe
- Release date: November 2011 (India)
- Running time: 99 minutes
- Country: India
- Language: Bhojpuri

HE... is a 2011 Bhojpuri film directed by Mangesh Joshi starring Madan Deodhar, Rajendra Gupta and Shashank Shende. This film was screened at International Film Festival of India in 2010 followed by Pune International Film Festival in 2011.

== Plot ==
Hari, A 13-years old ragpicker, runs away from Bihar to Mumbai. He bags a role in a Short film that makes him popular as "Hero".

== Production ==
Mangesh Joshi, started working on the script in 2008. He initially started writing the script in English, but since his characters were from Bihar, he made them converse in Bhojpuri instead of English.

== Release ==
The film was screened at International Film Festival of India and Pune International Film Festival in 2011.
