= Nagaram Marupakkam =

2010 film by Sundar C

- Theatrical release poster
- Directed by: Sundar C
- Written by: Sundar C T. Senthilkumaran (dialogues)
- Produced by: Khushbu; Sundar C
- Starring: Sundar C; Anuya Bhagvath; Vadivelu
- Cinematography: Chelladurai
- Edited by: Praveen K. L. N. B. Srikanth
- Music by: Thaman S
- Production company: Avni Cinemax
- Release date: 19 November 2010
- Running time: 150 minutes
- Country: India
- Language: Tamil

Nagaram Marupakkam (transl. The other side of town) also known simply as Nagaram is a 2010 Indian Tamil-language action comedy film directed by Sundar C, who plays the lead role and also co-wrote and co-produced the film. Co-produced by his wife Khushbu, the film also stars Anuya Bhagvath and Vadivelu in pivotal roles and features music by Thaman. Sundar's first directorial after four years, Nagaram released on 19 November 2010. It is based on the 1993 American film Carlito's Way. The film is well known for comedy sequences and portrayal of the comic character "Style Pandi" by Vadivelu.

== Plot ==
Selvam, a criminal, decides to turn a new life after coming out of jail. He lands a job in Hyderabad and falls in love with a dancer named Bharathi. Eventually, his past catches up to him. How he gets out of the predicament forms the story.

== Cast ==
- Sundar C as Selvam
- Anuya Bhagvath as Bharathi
- Vadivelu as Style Pandi
- Bose Venkat as Sakkara Pandi
- George Vishnu as Dhamu
- Sulile Kumar as Kaasi
- Ponnambalam as 'Thala Vetti' Thangarasu
- Vichu Vishwanath as 'Kudal Pudungi' Govindhan
- Besant Ravi as 'Kaal Vetti' Karuppiah
- Vittal Rao as Annachi
- Chitra Shenoy as Bharathi's mother and Annachi's second wife
- Nalini as Annachi's first wife
- V. S. Raghavan as Seth
- R. S. Shivaji as Director
- Halwa Vasu as Pandi's assistant
- Crane Manohar as Pandi's assistant
- Gowtham Sundararajan as Annachi's Son
- Ennatha Kannaiya
- Mano as Naidu
- G. Srinivasan as Kadhar Bhai
- Gowthami Vembunathan as House Owner (Maami)
- Bosskey as Inspector Venkatesh
- Vikas Rishi as Anwar
- Shobana
- Krishnamoorthy
- Muthukaalai
- Bava Lakshmanan as Pandi's assistant
- Velmurugan as Karadi
- Sakthivel as Iyer
- Vengal Rao as Lorry driver
- Maryam Zakaria as item number

== Soundtrack ==
Music is composed by Thaman S and released via Think Music India. Karthik of Milliblog wrote, "Punchy, likeable commercial soundtrack from a super-confident Thaman!".

All tracks are written by Vairamuthu.

Track listing
No.	Title	Singer(s)	Length
1.	"Eraivaa"	Ranjith, Rahul Nambiar, Naveen Madhav	3:42
2.	"Kuthudhu"	Naveen Madhav	4:33
3.	"Puducha"	Rahul Nambiar, Srivardhini	4:31
4.	"Thiki Thiki"	Ranjith, Megha	5:13
5.	"En Peru Krishnaveni"	Priya Himesh	4:45
6.	"Konjam Konjam"	Rita Thyagarajan	3:24
Total length:			26:08

== Critical reception ==
Sify wrote, "It is engrossing and moves like a thriller, with rapid twists and turns leading to a stunning climax". Pavithra Srinivasan of Rediff.com wrote, "The endless gang war sequences, filled with unruly men can get a bit tedious, while the screenplay takes its own sweet time to get to the end. The editing scissors could have been put to good use".
