= Chaitra (2002 film) =

Chaitra: In The Month of March
- Directed by: Kranti Kanade
- Written by: Kranti Kanade
- Based on: Chaitra by G. A. Kulkarni
- Produced by: Film and Television Institute of India
- Starring: Sonali Kulkarni; Lalan Sarang; Abhishek Bhave
- Cinematography: Mahesh Muthuswami
- Edited by: Kranti Kanade
- Music by: Bhaskar Chandavarkar
- Release date: 20 August 2002 (Mumbai International Film Festival)
- Running time: 25 minutes
- Country: India
- Language: Marathi

Chaitra is a short film by Kranti Kanade based on author G.A. Kulkarni's story of the same name. Kranti selected this story for his thesis short film towards completion of his degree in Direction from Film and Television Institute of India. The film went on to win three National Film Awards in 2002.

== Plot ==
The story of a proud woman, her poetic vindication of unfair social insult, and her inevitable sad destiny. A very culture-specific film dipped in a local festival of rural women.

== Cast ==
- Sonali Kulkarni as Mother
- Abhishek Bhave as Madhu
- Lalan Sarang as Naik Kaku
- Vandana Vakhnis as Naik baai
- Dhiresh Joshi as Father
- Bhakti Pathare as Rakhma
- Uttara Kulkarni as Shanta
- Shripad Amte as Mama

== Production ==
The film was shot in Alandi village near Pune and the post-production done at FTII. Being a student film, director did not have enough budget but Sonali Kulkarni and Lalan Sarang agreed to do the film without remuneration. Music director Bhaskar Chandavarkar not only composed music for the film without taking any remuneration but he also paid for the musicians himself. Cinematographer Mahesh Muthuswami contributed an amount towards the production and so did the sound designer Subir Das.

== Awards and recognition ==
Chaitra won three National Film Awards in 2002.

- National Film Award for Best Short Fiction Film
- National Film Award for Best Non-Feature Film Music Direction (Bhaskar Chandavarkar)
- National Film Award – Special Mention (Sonali Kulkarni)

At the Mumbai International Film Festival 2002 it won National Critics' Award and Best Short - Silver. That year, it was India's official entry to the Student Academy Awards.

The film was also included in a DVD titled "Master Strokes", a compilation of works of twenty renowned FTII students.
