= Pia Shah =

Indian film director

- Occupation: Film director
- Known for: Water Baby
- Awards: National Film Award

Pia Shah is an Indian film director, best known for her film Water Baby for which she was awarded a National Film Award for Best Debut Films of a director at the 65th National Film Awards. The award was presented by President Ram Nath Kovind.

The film is about a bullied boy battling his own hydrophobia.
