= Sanjeev Srivastava =

Indian journalist

Sanjeev Srivastava is an Indian journalist. He was the India editor of BBC Hindi service, including Internet and radio, from 2006, having previously been a correspondent for the BBC. He started the BBC's first Mumbai Bureau reporting across BBC television and radio services in English, Hindi and Urdu. Before joining the BBC, he worked with the Times of India and Indian Express.

Srivastava joined Sahara News Media Group as editor and CEO in December 2009, reporting to Sahara Group's chairman, Subrata Roy Sahara. He resigned from Sahara on 5 May 2010.

In 2011, Srivastava travelled across India as a journalism trainer with the BBC World Service Trust and continues to report for the BBC.

Srivastava has also been the editor-at-large at Firstpost.com. He was the editor of DD News prime time show Newsnight 8pm – 10 pm before joining Focus News as group editor. He is the recipient of the Haldi Ghati award for journalism.
