= Shreya Sharma =

Indian child film actress

- Born: Shimla, India
- Education: Loreto Convent, Tara Hall, Shimla
- Occupation: Actress
- Years active: 2005–present

Shreya Sharma is an Indian child film actress. She lives in Shimla, Himachal Pradesh, India.

== Filmography ==
She acted first at the age of 13 in film The Blue Umbrella.

Year	Title	Role	Notes
2005	The Blue Umbrella	Biniya	Fim won Golden Lotus Award for Best Children's Film.
2006	Vivah		
2007	Mahek	Mahek	Best Family Film (Platinum Remi Awards), Houston Film Festival, 2008. Selected on a university syllabus by Ohio University, USA. Film nominated for the Best Children's Film at the Asia Pacific Screen Awards, Australia.
2008	Saas Bahu Aur Sensex	Thea Pandol	
2011	A Decent Arrangement	Suriya	

== Other ==
On the occasion of 125th birth year of popular Hindi writer Chandradhar Sharma ‘Guleri’, a special screening of the film Usne Kaha Tha based on one of his popular stories was held on 19 July 2008 in the capital city of Himachal Pradesh. Shreya Sharma narrated the story ahead of the screening, held at Auckland House School, Longwood.
