= Sutapa Deb =

Indian journalist

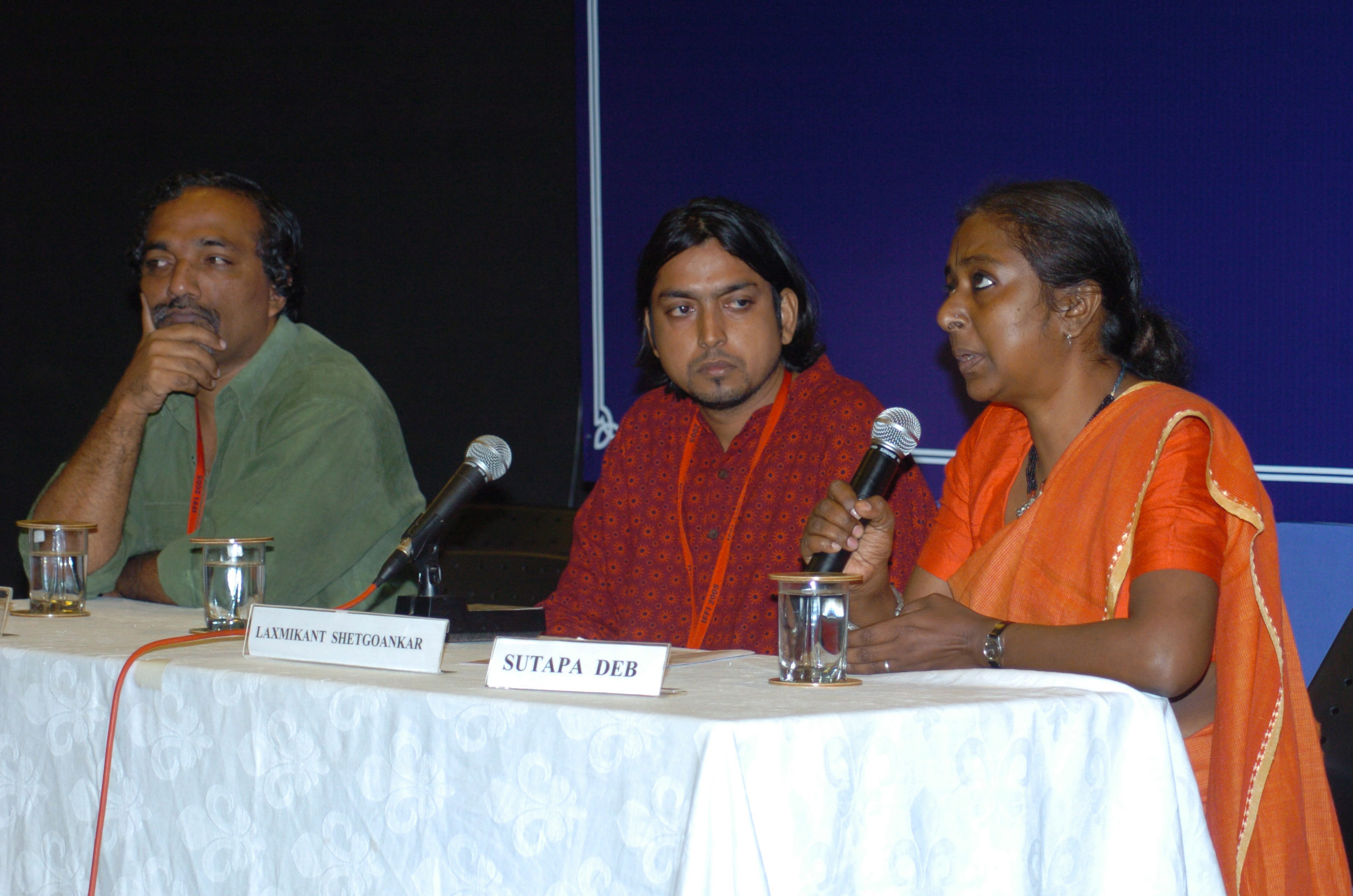
- Sutapa Deb (right), IFFI (2005)
- Occupation: Journalist

Sutapa Deb is an Indian television journalist. Her journey as a journalist began with Indian Express and India Today in Delhi. She made the transition from print to television when she joined NDTV.

She has a postgraduate in English literature,. As a television journalist she has reported on education, women, children, health, labour, disability and unemployment. She traveled to villages in West Bengal, Manipur, Chhattisgarh, Jharkhand, Haryana, Madhya Pradesh and other states to bring the voices of the rural to mainstream news coverage.

She is a part of series India Matters on NDTV. In certain cases, the reports have made the administration take action. In, 2002, her documentary on the Unsung Heroes of the Gujarat earthquake won her the Indian Telly Award for the best documentary of the year.

Sutapa Deb has been honoured with the 'Commonwealth Broadcasting Association-Thomson Foundation Journalist of the Year' award at the CBA's Broadcasting Awards for 2008.
