= Vijaya Mehta =

Indian theatre and film (1934–2026)

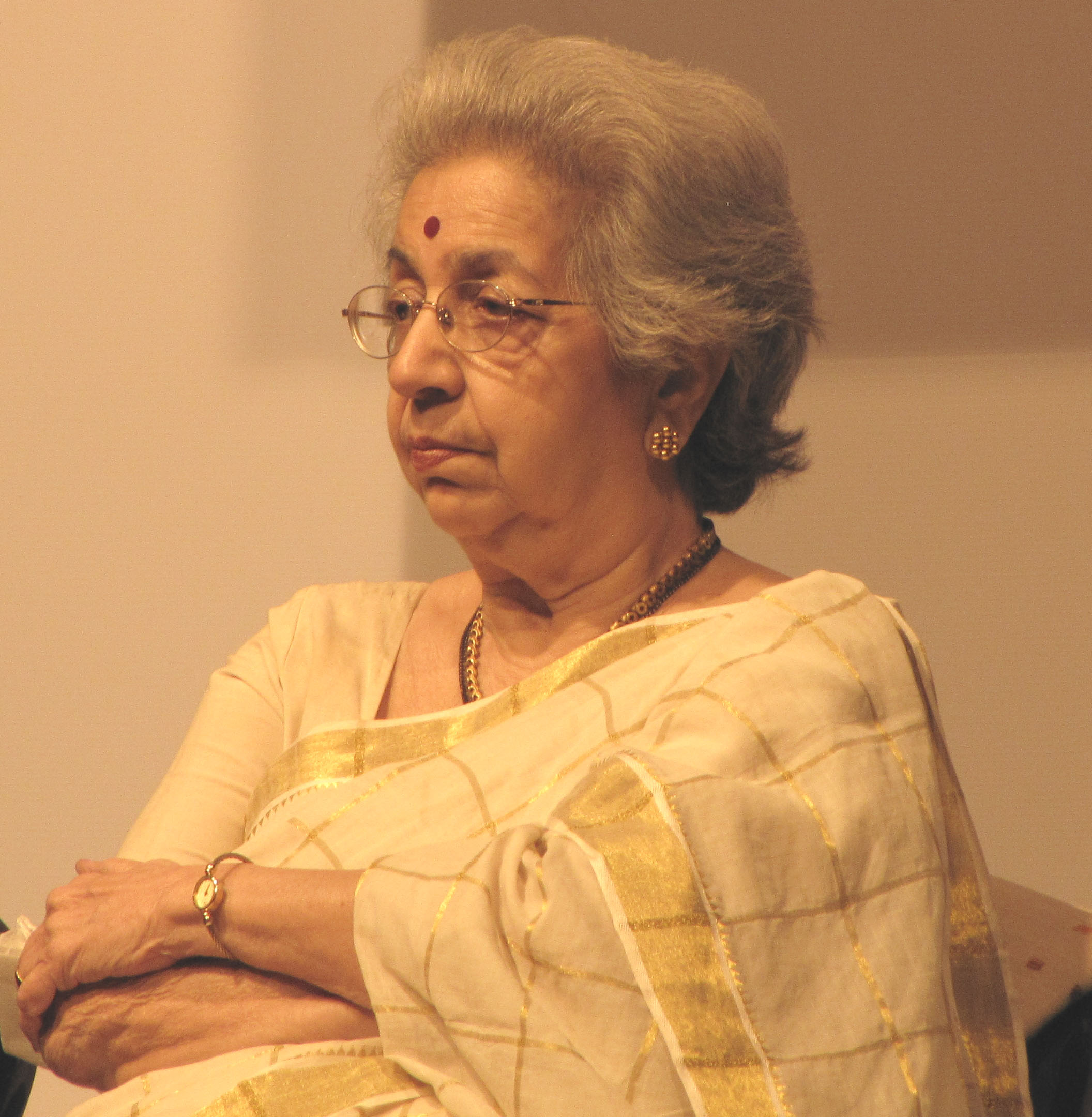
- Mehta in 2012
- Born: Vijaya Jaywant; 4 November 1934; Baroda, Baroda State, British India
- Died: 30 June 2026 (aged 91); Mumbai, Maharashtra, India
- Spouse(s): Harin Khote (died) Farrokh Mehta (died)
- Children: 3
- Awards: 1975 Sangeet Natak Akademi Award; 1985 Asia Pacific Film Festival, Best Actress: Party; 1986 National Film Award for Best Supporting Actress: Rao Saheb; 1987 Padma Shri

Vijaya Mehta (born Jaywant; 4 November 1934 – 30 June 2026) was an Indian Marathi film and theatre director and an actor in many films in Parallel cinema. Mehta was best known for her acclaimed role in the film Party (1984) and for her directorial ventures, Rao Saheb (1986) and Pestonjee (1988). She was a founder member of Mumbai-based theatre group, Rangayan, with playwright Vijay Tendulkar and actors Arvind Deshpande and Shriram Lagoo. As the founder member of the group, she became a leading figure in the experimental Marathi theatre of the 1960s.

== Early life and education ==
Vijaya Mehta was born as Vijaya Jaywant in Baroda, Baroda State (now in Gujarat) on 4 November 1934. She graduated from Mumbai University. She studied theatre with Ebrahim Alkazi in Delhi and with Adi Marzban.

== Career ==
Mehta became a major figure in 1960s Marathi experimental theatre. She was a founder member of theatre group Rangayan with playwright Vijay Tendulkar, Arvind Deshpande and Shriram Lagoo.

Her stage production of C. T. Khanolkar's Ek Shoonya Bajirao is considered as a landmark in contemporary Indian theatre. She introduced Bertold Brecht into Marathi theatre with an adaptation of The Caucasian Chalk Circle (Ajab Nyay Vartulacha), and Ionesco with Chairs. She also collaborated on Indo-German theatre projects with German director Fritz Bennewitz, including a traditional performance of Bhasa's Mudrarakshasa with German actors.

Other than Pestonjee, most of her work consists of film and television adaptations of her stage plays.

== Recognition and awards ==
Mehta was awarded the 1975 Sangeet Natak Akademi Award for excellence in Direction.. In 1986 she won the National Film Award for Best Supporting Actress for her role in Rao Saheb (1986).

== Personal life and death ==
Mehta first married Harin Khote, son of actress Durga Khote; Following his early death, she raised their two sons, Ravi Khote and Deven Khote. She later married theatre personality Farrokh Mehta, with whom she has a daughter, Anahita Uberoi.

Mehta died in Mumbai on 30 June 2026, at the age of 91.

== Filmography ==
- Kalyug (1981) – actor
- Smriti Chitre (1982, TV film) – director, actor
- Shakuntalam (1986, TV film) – director
- Party (1984) – actor
- Rao Saheb (1985) – director, screenwriter, actor
- Haveli Bulund Thi (1987, TV film) – director
- Hamidabai Ki Kothi (1987, TV film) – director
- Pestonjee (1988) – director, screenwriter
- Lifeline (1991, TV Series) – director
- Quest (2006) – actor

== Awards ==
- 1975: Sangeet Natak Akademi Award
- 1985: Asia Pacific Film Festival: Best Actress: Party
- 1986: National Film Award for Best Supporting Actress: Rao Saheb
- 2004: Zee Chitra Gaurav Lifetime Achievement Award
- 2009: Tanveer Sanmaan
- 2012: Sangeet Natak Akademi Tagore Ratna

== See also ==
- Theatre in India
