= Kranti Kanade =

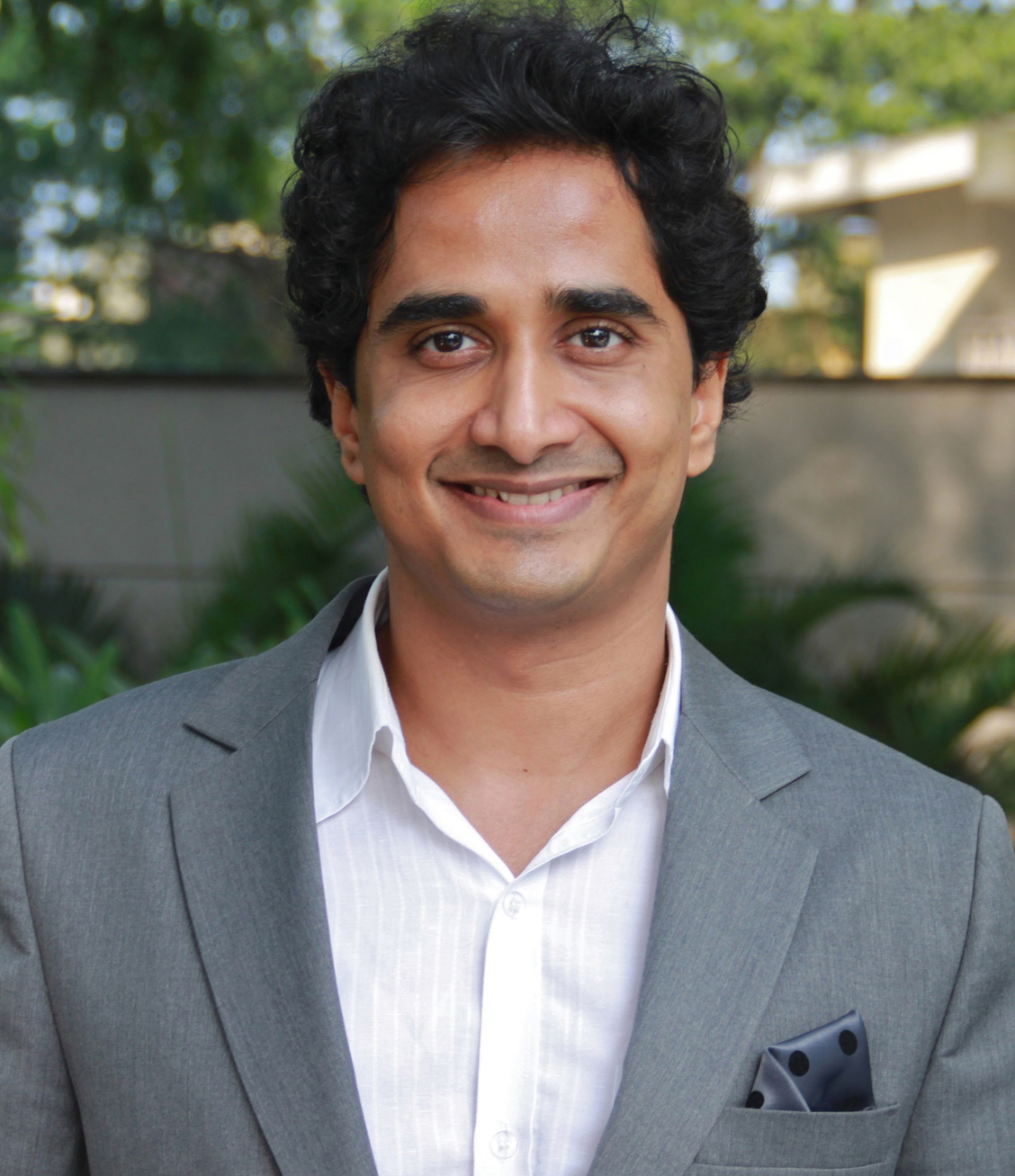
Kranti Kanade

Kranti Kanade is a National Award winning Indian filmmaker. His films include Peepal Tree, CRD (film), Gandhi of the Month, Mahek and Chaitra. He studied at UCLA (University of California, Los Angeles) and FTII (Film and Television Institute of India).

== Films ==
=== Peepal Tree ===
Based on true events, it deals with the issue of illegal tree killings in India. When a Police Academy cuts Sacred Trees, a concerned Family confronts them only to learn it is a non-cognizable offense without penal provision. They approach a Tree Activist who saves trees by all means. The community gathers under the tree at night to protect it but it is not that simple."

=== CRD ===
Set in the world of College Theatre, CRD probes fascism and fierce competition in arts with a wildly innovative narrative style. It released theatrically in US and India to major critical acclaim and commercial success gaining 100% rating on Rotten Tomatoes. Los Angeles Times called it "Enchanting, audacious and infectious" and acclaimed film critic Namrata Joshi of The Hindu called it "Brilliant, subversive and fearless, it boldly goes where no Indian film has gone before." It was in the top Ten Best Hindi films of 2017 list by The Hindu, Top Ten list of Huffington Post critic Murtaza Ali Khan, and was included in the top ten films of the decade list of Scroll.in critic Nandini Ramnath calling it "The decade in Bollywood: The movies that dared to dream differently. Most enduring and endearing films made between 2010 and 2019."

=== Gandhi of the Month ===
Gandhi of the Month stars legendary actor Harvey Keitel, Neeraj Kabi and other major Indian actors. It is about an American schoolmaster in India struggling to protect his students from fundamentalists. The screenplay, earlier called 'Against Itself' won the Film Fund Grant by the Indian Film Festival of Los Angeles. The jury included Gill Dennis (Walk The Line), Anurag Kashyap (Gangs Of Wasseypur) and Sooni Taraporevala (Salaam Bombay). The script was mentored by Oscar winner Danis Tanovic (No Man's Land), Bernd Lichtenberg (Good Bye Lenin!), Olivia Hetreed (Girl With A Pearl Earring) and Anjum Rajabali (Rajneeti).

=== Mahek ===
Mahek, a children's film, is about 11-yr old girl who dreams of becoming the very best at everything, but is unsure of how to achieve her goals. It premiered at the BFI London Film Festival to affectionate reviews. Film Scholar & Writer Rachel Dwyer called it "A Gem of a film", Critic & Writer Maithili Rao called it "A rare combination of sensitivity and gentle humour." Invited to festivals around the world, it received awards in Hollywood and Houston. It was Best Children's Film Nominee at the Asia Pacific Screen Awards in Australia and shown as part of syllabus at Otterbein University in US.

=== Chaitra ===
Chaitra, is based on a story by legendary Marathi author G. A. Kulkarni. Set in the traditional haldi-kunku festival, it intertwines themes of poetic justice and destiny. It won five National Film Awards including Best Short Film, Best Music for Short Film (Pt Bhaskar Chandavarkar) and Special Jury Award for Acting (Sonali Kulkarni). It won two National Awards at MIFF Film Festival.
