= Get Gorgeous =

- Genre: Reality television
- Country of origin: India
- Original languages: English, Hindi
- No. of seasons: 6
- No. of episodes: 65

Production
- Running time: 60 minutes (with commercial)

Original release
- Network: Star India; Channel V India
- Release: 1 July 2004 – 21 November 2010

Get Gorgeous was an Indian reality television show and model talent search that premiered in 2004 by one of India's music channels, Channel V India. The show was formatted by Kaveri Mehrotra while Amar Deb was the head of the channel. Get Gorgeous was about discovering the next face of modeling in India.

== Judges and other staff members ==
Judge/ Staff Member	Season (cycle)					
Judge/ Staff Member	1 (2004)	2 (2005)	3 (2006)	4 (2007)	5 (2008)	6 (2010)
Hosts
Sarah-Jane Dias	Main					
Archana Vijaya	Contestant	Main				
Pia Trivedi			Main	Main	Main	
VJ Andy					Main	Main
Judging panelists
Mickey Mehta	Main					
Sameer Parekh	Main					
Tanya LeFebvre	Main					
Aparna Chandra	Main					
Aparna Behl	Main	Main				
Ambika Pillai	Main	Main				
Hemant Trivedi	Main	Main				
Milind Soman		Main				
Mohan Neelkantan		Main				
Nayanika Chatterjee		Main	Main			
Colston Julian		Main	Main			
Dino Morea			Main			
Marc Robinson			Main			
Surily Goel			Main			
Rajeev Goswami			Main			
Nikhil Mehra				Main		
Shantanu Mehra				Main		
Neha Kapur				Main		
Alison Kanuga				Main		
Deanne Pandey				Main		
Samantha Kochhar				Main		
Manoj Jadhav				Main		
Kushal Parmanand				Main		
Rahul Khanna					Main	
Rohit Gandhi					Main	
Nisha Kutty					Main	
Yasmin Haz					Main	
Upen Patel					Main	
Kamal Sidhu						Main
Vikram Bawa						Main
Gayatri Khanna						Main
Model mentor
Diandra Soares					Main	
Gauahar Khan					Main	
Sahil Shroff						Main
Archana Vijaya	Contestant					Main

== Seasons ==
Season	Premiere date	Winner	Runner-up	Other contestants	Number of contestants	Destination
1	1 July 2004	Aarohi Mishra; Archana Vijaya; Natasha Suri; Tanvi Singh	—N/a	Abha Bakaya, Anjali Raj, Asha B. R., Drashta Sarvaiya, Lakshmi Rebecca, Latika Chauhan, Mihika Verma, Natasha Bahmani, Natasha Sethi, Sanya Aslam Shaikh, Sapna Chandrasekaran, Shereen Appanna	16	(India); Goa; Mumbai
2	23 April 2005	Priyanka Shah	Tina Noronha	Mitali Badkur & Tanushree Biswas & Tina Desai & Tonisha Pawar, Kanika Khanna & Priyanka Kumar & Rinita Talapatra & Smita Sharma, Chahat Sabaji & Mahima Chaudhary & Melanie D'Mello & Ridhima Sharma, Malika Jan & Sudharani Gupta	16	(Sri Lanka); Bentota (India); Mumbai
3	16 March 2006	Anurita Jha; Meenal Thakur	Dipitha Shayan	Andrea Wiltshire, Dimple Anand, Jyothi Mahadev, Rucha Gawas, Rupalee Yadav, Swetha Reddy	15	(India); Mumbai
4	7 June 2007	Rachel Varghese	Rebecca Maumkel	Sarika, Mizpah Waters, Sneha, Nina Sarkar, Kirtana Krishnan, Arlette Evita Grao, Arika Silaichia, Nidhi Sunil	10	(India); Goa; Mumbai
5	16 May 2008	Iris Maity	Gwendolyn Athaide; Salome Narayana Polaki	Himani & Pavitra & Ramya & Saghar, Sameera, Lavanya Tripathi, Roopa, Arushi Virani, Aarohi Kadam & Anjali Raut & Setareh Nour	14	(India); Kerala; Mumbai (France); Paris
6	29 August 2010	Preeti Chauhan; Rajat Dahiya	Roushni Das; Udit Methi	Gauri Janwalikar & Michael Obidiki, Charudutt Sapra, Tanya Nambiar, Shibani Suvarna, Pankaj Tanwar, Ankit Raj & Hazel Sobti, Asmita Sood, Samridh Bawa, Asif Sataar & Mruga Kulkarni, Riddhima Shahani, Veir Dhillon, Bharat Sharma & Jenny Ghottra	20	(India); Goa; Mumbai; Delhi

== Get Gorgeous 1 ==
The show's first season aired on 1 July 2004, with the finale on 23 September 2004. It had 6,000 entries received and 16 finalists were taken to the coast of Goa. The season was hosted by VJ Sarah-Jane Dias, with renowned fitness instructor Mickey Mehta, photographer Sameer Parekh, well-known choreographers Tanya LeFebvre and Aparna Behl, designer Aparna Chandra, make-up expert Ambika Pillai and Hemant Trivedi as judges.

The show's prizes for this season include walking for designer Suneet Verma at Rome Fashion Week and a contract with Elite Model Management in India. The four winners were Aarohi Mishra, Archana Vijaya, Natasha Suri and Tanvi Singh.

=== Contestants ===
Name	Age	Height	Hometown
Abha Bakaya	23	1.73 m (5 ft 8 in)	Delhi
Anjali Raj	19	1.65 m (5 ft 5 in)	Mumbai
Asha B. R.	20	1.78 m (5 ft 10 in)	Bangalore
Drashta Sarvaiya	23	1.70 m (5 ft 7 in)	Delhi
Lakshmi Rebecca	23	1.75 m (5 ft 9 in)	Chennai
Latika Chauhan	21	1.75 m (5 ft 9 in)	Delhi
Mihika Verma	19	1.75 m (5 ft 9 in)	Mumbai
Natasha Bahmani	17	1.70 m (5 ft 7 in)	Mumbai
Natasha Sethi	20	1.73 m (5 ft 8 in)	Mumbai
Sanya Aslam Shaikh	17	1.85 m (6 ft 1 in)	Mumbai
Sapna Chandrasekaran	23	1.70 m (5 ft 7 in)	Bangalore
Shereen Appanna	20	1.69 m (5 ft 6 1/2 in)	Bangalore
Aarohi Mishra	18	1.70 m (5 ft 7 in)	Bangalore
Archana Vijaya	21	1.72 m (5 ft 7 1/2 in)	Kolkata
Natasha Suri	20	1.73 m (5 ft 8 in)	Mumbai
Tanvi Singh	20	1.75 m (5 ft 9 in)	Bhopal

== Get Gorgeous 2 ==
The second season first aired on 23 April 2005, with the finale on 11 June 2005, and it was hosted by season 1 winner Archana Vijaya. It had 5,000 entries received and 16 finalists were taken to the training camp at Taj Exotica in Bentota, Sri Lanka. The season had designers Hemant Trivedi, model Noyonika Chatterjee and model-turned-actor Milind Soman as judges.

The winner of the season was Priyanka Shah. She receive:

- A talent contract with Channel V India
- A modelling contract with Elite Model Management in India
- A campaign for LG CDMA
- Will be walking at India Fashion Week

=== Contestants ===
Name	Age	Height	Hometown	Outcome	Place
Mitali Badkur	24	1.70 m (5 ft 7 in)	Bangalore	Episode 3	16-13
Tanushree Biswas	19	1.65 m (5 ft 5 in)	Pune	Episode 3	16-13
Tina Desai	21	1.68 m (5 ft 6 in)	Bangalore	Episode 3	16-13
Tonisha Pawar	21	1.75 m (5 ft 9 in)	Bangalore	Episode 3	16-13
Kanika Khanna	20	1.75 m (5 ft 9 in)	Delhi	Episode 5	12-9
Priyanka Kumar	23	1.65 m (5 ft 5 in)	Delhi	Episode 5	12-9
Rinita Talapatra	18	1.60 m (5 ft 3 in)	Mumbai	Episode 5	12-9
Smita Sharma	22	1.72 m (5 ft 7 1/2 in)	Delhi	Episode 5	12-9
Chahat Sabaji	22	1.80 m (5 ft 11 in)	Delhi	Episode 6	8-5
Mahima Chaudhary	17	1.73 m (5 ft 8 in)	Pune	Episode 6	8-5
Melanie D'Mello	21	1.70 m (5 ft 7 in)	Mumbai	Episode 6	8-5
Ridhima Sharma	20	1.70 m (5 ft 7 in)	Mumbai	Episode 6	8-5
Malika Jan	22	1.73 m (5 ft 8 in)	Bangalore	Episode 8	4-3
Sudharani Gupta	22	1.72 m (5 ft 7 1/2 in)	Mumbai	Episode 8	4-3
Tina Noronha	22	1.70 m (5 ft 7 in)	Bangalore	Episode 8	2
Priyanka Shah	21	1.73 m (5 ft 8 in)	Pune	Episode 8	1

== Get Gorgeous 3 ==
The third season first aired on 16 March 2006, and with the finale on 4 May 2006, and had fifteen finalists. The season was hosted by VJ Pia Trivedi, with model-turned-actor Dino Morea, model and ace fashion choreographer Marc Robinson, fashion designer Surily Goel, ace fashion choreographer Colston Julian, model Noyonika Chatterjee, and choreographer Rajiv Goswami as judges.

The prizes include: a talent contract with Channel V India and a modelling contract with Matrix Model Management in India. The winners of this season were Anurita Jha and Mrunal Thakur.

=== Season 3 Contestants ===
Name	Age
Andrea Wiltshire	17
Shruti Narayan	20
Dimple Anand	
Jyothi Mahadev	
Liza	
Mallika Bhatt	
Rucha Gawas	18
Rupalee Yadav	
Sabreen	
Shwetha Reddy	
Simran Bhoai	
Sofia	
Dipitha Shayan	
Anurita Jha	23
Meenal Thakur	22

== Get Gorgeous 4 ==
The fourth season aired on 7 June 2007 and with the finale on 9 August 2007.

VJ Pia Trivedi will once again host this season, along with the judging panel were make-up artist Samantha Kochhar, fashion choreographer Alison Kanuga, fashion designer duo Shantanu Mehra & Nikhil Mehra, former model-turned-celebrity fitness trainer Deanne Pandey, Femina Miss India Universe 2006 Neha Kapur, photographer Manoj Jadhav and fashion editor for Seventeen Kushal Parmanand. The 10 finalists travelled to the Swaswara resort in Goa. The prizes include: a talent contract with Channel V India and a modelling contract with Elite Model Management in India. The winner of the season was Rachel Varghese.

The Grand Finale had over 1,000 guests visiting the live runway. The anchor of the live show was Channel V's VJ Pia Trivedi. During the taping of the season, Channel [V] allowed a blogger from Trendy.com to live among the contestants and collect exclusive behind-the-scenes material for a section of the show's website called "The Gorgeous Blogger".

=== Contestants ===
Name	Age	Height	Hometown	Outcome	Place
Sarika	23	1.65 m (5 ft 5 in)	Bangalore	Episode 4	10-9
Mizpah Waters	24	1.63 m (5 ft 4 in)	Delhi	Episode 4	10-9
Sneha	24	1.70 m (5 ft 7 in)	Delhi	Episode 5	8-7
Nina Sarkar	19	1.70 m (5 ft 7 in)	Mumbai	Episode 5	8-7
Kirtana Krishnan	22	1.70 m (5 ft 7 in)	Bangalore	Episode 7	6
Arlette Evita Grao	18	1.65 m (5 ft 5 in)	Mumbai	Episode 13	5-4
Arika Silaichia	17	1.70 m (5 ft 7 in)	Pune	Episode 13	5-4
Nidhi Sunil	20	1.68 m (5 ft 6 in)	Bangalore	Episode 13	3
Rebecca Maumkel	18	1.75 m (5 ft 9 in)	Mumbai	Episode 13	2
Rachel Varghese	19	1.70 m (5 ft 7 in)	Mumbai	Episode 13	1

== Get Gorgeous 5 ==
The fifth season aired on 16 May 2008 and with the finale on 26 July 2008. The 10 finalists travelled to Kerala and the 3 finalist travelled to Paris. This season garnered an average of 10 million viewers, making it the highest rated season of the show's history.

VJ Pia Trivedi will once again host this season, along with the judging panel were fashion designer duo Rahul Khanna & Rohit Gandhi, fitness expert Yasmin Haz, photographer Nisha Kutty and actor Upen Patel. Indian Supermodels Diandra Soares and Gauahar Khan were also judges and their model mentor.

The winner of the season was Iris Maity, beating Gwen Athaide and Salome Narayana Polaki in the finale. She receive:

- A talent contract with Channel V worth ₹1.000.000
- A modelling contract with ICE Model Management
- A trip to Paris to feature in a shoot for Christian Dior
- An exclusive splash feature in L'Officiel

=== Season 5 Contestants ===
Name	Age	Height	Hometown	Model Coach	Outcome	Place
Himani Sharma	20	1.68 m (5 ft 6 in)	Noida	—N/a	Episode 2	14-11
Pavitra	20		Mumbai	—N/a	Episode 2	14-11
Ramya	21		Mumbai	—N/a	Episode 2	14-11
Saghar	19		Pune	—N/a	Episode 2	14-11
Sameera Baig	22	1.67 m (5 ft 5 1/2 in)	Mumbai	Diandra	Episode 3	10
Lavanya Tripathi	18	1.65 m (5 ft 5 in)	Dehradun	Gauahar	Episode 4	9
Roopa	19	1.68 m (5 ft 6 in)	Pune	Diandra	Episode 5	8
Arushi S Pilot	19	1.73 m (5 ft 8 in)	Mumbai	Gauahar	Episode 6	7
Aarohi Kadam	22	1.76 m (5 ft 9 1/2 in)	Mumbai	Gauahar	Episode 7	6-4
Anjali Raut	21	1.78 m (5 ft 10 in)	Mumbai	Diandra	Episode 7	6-4
Setareh Nour	18	1.65 m (5 ft 5 in)	Mumbai	Diandra	Episode 7	6-4
Gwendolyn Athaide	24	1.70 m (5 ft 7 in)	Mumbai	Gauahar	Episode 10	3-2
Salome Narayana Polaki	22	1.70 m (5 ft 7 in)	Mumbai	Gauahar	Episode 10	3-2
Iris Maity	24	1.70 m (5 ft 7 in)	Mumbai	Diandra	Episode 10	1

== Get Gorgeous 6 ==
The sixth season aired on 29 August 2010 and with the finale on 21 November 2010. This season was hosted by VJ Andy with the brand new judges were: model Kamal Sidhu, fashion photographer Vikram Bawa and fashion designer Gayatri Khanna, and 2 new mentor are supermodels Sahil Shroff & Archana Vijaya. After 2 years gap, the show return with 20 brand new contestant, including male contestant for the first time. The prizes include a 1-year modelling contract with Kwan Entertainment. The two winner of the season were Preeti Chauhan & Rajat Dahiya.

=== Contestant ===
Name	Age	Height	Hometown	Model Coach	Outcome	Place
Gauri Janwalikar		1.70 m (5 ft 7 in)	Mumbai	Archana	Episode 2	20-19
Michael Obidiki	25	1.90 m (6 ft 3 in)	Nashik	Archana	Episode 2	20-19
Charudutt Sapra	21	1.83 m (6 ft 0 in)	New Delhi	Sahil	Episode 3	18
Tanya Nambiar	23	1.72 m (5 ft 7 1/2 in)	New Delhi	Sahil	Episode 4	17
Shibani Suvarna	23	1.73 m (5 ft 8 in)	Pune	Archana	Episode 5	16
Pankaj Tanwar	21	1.88 m (6 ft 2 in)	Haryana	Sahil	Episode 6	15
Ankit Raj	22	1.83 m (6 ft 0 in)	New Delhi	Archana	Episode 7	14-13
Hazel Sobti	21	1.58 m (5 ft 2 in)	Goa	Sahil	Episode 7	14-13
Asmita Sood	20	1.68 m (5 ft 6 in)	Shimla	Sahil	Episode 8	12
Samridh Bawa	19	1.70 m (5 ft 7 in)	Mumbai	Archana	Episode 9	11
Asif Sataar	21	1.83 m (6 ft 0 in)	Kashmir	Archana	Episode 10	10-9
Mruga Kulkarni	19	1.85 m (6 ft 1 in)	Pune	Archana	Episode 10	10-9
Riddhima Shahani	20	1.68 m (5 ft 6 in)	Pune	Sahil	Episode 11	8
Veir Dhillon	20	1.90 m (6 ft 3 in)	Pune	Archana	Episode 12	7
Bharat Sharma	25	1.88 m (6 ft 2 in)	Mumbai	Sahil	Episode 12	6-5
Jagdip "Jenny" Ghottra	23	1.72 m (5 ft 7 1/2 in)	Toronto, Canada	Sahil	Episode 12	6-5
Roushni Das†	18	1.66 m (5 ft 5 1/2 in)	Mumbai	Archana	Episode 13	4-3
Udit Methi	23	1.88 m (6 ft 2 in)	Pune	Sahil	Episode 13	4-3
Preeti Chauhan	23	1.74 m (5 ft 8 1/2 in)	New Delhi	Archana	Episode 13	2-1
Rajat Dahiya	22	1.80 m (5 ft 11 in)	New Delhi	Sahil	Episode 13	2-1

=== Results ===
Place	Model	Episodes											
Place	Model	2	3	4 (Note: In episode 4, Tanya was eliminated from the casting challenge. Because of that, Mruga, who was eliminated last week, return to the competition.) (Note: In episode 5, Asmita, Jenny & Shibani, who was in the bottom in the last episode, have a shoot-out in swimsuit at the pool, and Shibani was eliminated on that battle. The elimination in episode 5 was not shown, which carried over into the episode 6.)	6	7	8 (Note: The elimination result in episode 8 was not shown, which carried over into the first half of episode 9.)	9	10	11 (Note: In episode 11, Jenny & Rajat return to the competition for having the most audience's vote.)	12 (Note: In episode 12, Veir was eliminated for the worst performance on the commercial.The elimination result in episode 12 was not shown, which carried over into the first half of episode 13.)		13
2-1	Preeti	SAFE	SAFE	SAFE	SAFE	LOW	SAFE	SAFE	SAFE	SAFE	LOW	SAFE	WINNER
2-1	Rajat	SAFE	SAFE	SAFE	SAFE	SAFE	OUT			SAFE	SAFE	LOW	WINNER
4-3	Roushni	SAFE	SAFE	SAFE	SAFE	SAFE	SAFE	SAFE	LOW	LOW	SAFE	LOW	OUT
4-3	Udit	LOW	SAFE	SAFE	SAFE	LOW	SAFE	LOW	SAFE	SAFE	LOW	SAFE	OUT
6-5	Bharat	SAFE	LOW	SAFE	SAFE	SAFE	SAFE	SAFE	SAFE	SAFE	SAFE	OUT	
6-5	Jenny	SAFE	SAFE	LOW	OUT					SAFE	SAFE	OUT	
7	Veir	SAFE	SAFE	SAFE	SAFE	SAFE	SAFE	SAFE	LOW	SAFE	OUT		
8	Riddhima	LOW	SAFE	SAFE	LOW	SAFE	LOW	SAFE	SAFE	OUT			
10-9	Asif	LOW	SAFE	SAFE	LOW	SAFE	LOW	SAFE	OUT				
10-9	Mruga	SAFE	OUT		SAFE	SAFE	SAFE	SAFE	OUT				
11	Samridh	SAFE	SAFE	SAFE	SAFE	SAFE	IMM	OUT					
12	Asmita	SAFE	SAFE	LOW	SAFE	SAFE	OUT						
14-13	Ankit	SAFE	SAFE	SAFE	SAFE	OUT							
14-13	Hazel	SAFE	SAFE	SAFE	SAFE	OUT							
15	Pankaj	SAFE	SAFE	SAFE	OUT								
16	Shibani	SAFE	SAFE	LOW	OUT								
17	Tanya	LOW	LOW	OUT									
18	Charudutt	SAFE	OUT										
20-19	Gauri	OUT											
20-19	Michael	OUT											

The contestant was eliminated
The contestant was eliminated outside of judging panel
The contestant was immune from elimination
The contestant won the competition

=== Challenges ===
- Episode 2 photo shoot: Makeover
- Episode 3 photo shoot: Swimsuit calendar for MiD-DAY
- Episode 4 commercial: Garnier product in pair
- Episode 5 commercial: Garnier product
- Episode 6 photo shoot: Homosexuality couple
- Episode 7 photo shoot: Adam and Eve
- Episode 8 video shoot & commercial: Bollywood couple; Scooty Pep motorbike in group
- Episode 9 commercial & photo shoot: LG Cookie smartphone in group; Rags to riches editorial
- Episode 10 photo shoot: Love in the air
- Episode 11 photo shoot: Marico Hair & Care campaign
- Episode 12 commercial & photo shoot: Mumbai Underworld online game; Grazia editorial in pairs
- Episode 13 runway: India Fashion Week 2010
