= 66th National Film Awards =

Indian ceremony celebrating cinema of 2018

- Awarded for: Best of Indian cinema in 2018
- Awarded by: Directorate of Film Festivals
- Presented by: M. Venkaiah Naidu (Vice President of India)
- Announced on: 9 August 2019
- Presented on: 23 December 2019
- Hosted by: Divya Dutta; Sonali Kulkarni
- Official website: dff.gov.in

Highlights
- Best Feature Film: Hellaro
- Best Non-Feature Film: • Son Rise • The Secret Life of Frogs
- Best Book: Mouna Prarthana Pole
- Best Film Critic: • Blais Johnny • Anant Vijay
- Dadasaheb Phalke Award: Amitabh Bachchan
- Most awards: Nathicharami (5)

The 66th National Film Awards ceremony was the award ceremony which took place in 2019 to honour the best films of 2018 in Indian cinema. The declaration of awards was delayed due to the 2019 Indian general election.

== Selection process ==
The Directorate of Film Festivals invited online entries and the acceptable last date for entries was until 22 January 2019. Feature and Non-Feature Films certified by the Central Board of Film Certification between 1 January 2018 and 31 December 2018 were eligible for the film award categories. Books, critical studies, reviews or articles on cinema published in Indian newspapers, magazines, and journals between 1 January 2018, and 31 December 2018, were eligible for the best writing on cinema section. Entries of dubbed, revised or copied versions of a film or translation, abridgements, edited or annotated works and reprints were ineligible for the awards.

For the Feature and Non-Feature Films sections, films in any Indian language, shot on 16 mm, 35 mm, a wider film gauge or a digital format, and released in cinemas, on video or digital formats for home viewing were eligible. Films were required to be certified as a feature film, a featurette or a Documentary/Newsreel/Non-Fiction by the Central Board of Film Certification.

== Best Film Friendly State ==
The awards aim at encouraging study and appreciation of cinema as an art form and dissemination of information and critical appreciation of this art-form through a State Government Policy.

- Jury Members

• Ramesh Sippy (Chairperson)
• Vivek Agnihotri
• Uday Singh

Award	Name of State	Citation
Best Film Friendly State	State of Uttarakhand	For furthering the growth of the film industry in the State including creating an environment for ease of filming in the State, encouraging skill/talent development, incentivizing the re-opening of closed cinema halls, formation of film development fund, continuing with the earlier incentive plan for filming, formation of Utttarakhand Film Development Council among other pro active initiatives.

== Dadasaheb Phalke Award ==
Introduced in 1969, the Dadasaheb Phalke Award is the highest award given to recognise the contributions of film personalities towards the development of Indian cinema and for distinguished contributions to the medium, its growth and promotion. The recipient is awarded with the 'Golden Lotus Award (Swarna Kamal)', cash prize, and a shawl.

Award	Image	Awardee(s)	Awarded As	Cash prize
Dadasaheb Phalke Award		Amitabh Bachchan	Actor	₹1 million (US$10,000)

== Feature films ==
=== Jury ===
For the Feature Film section, six committees were formed based on the different geographic regions in India. The two-tier evaluation process included a central committee and five regional committees. The central committee, headed by the director Priyadarshan, included the heads of each regional committee and five other jury members. At regional level, each committee consisted of one chief and four members. The chief and one non-chief member of each regional committee were selected from outside that geographic region. The table below names the jury members for the central and regional committees:

Central Jury

• Rahul Rawail (Chairperson)
• Rajdutt	• Sabyasachi Mohapatra
• K. Vasu	• Archana R. Singh
• Vijayakrishnan	• Major Ravi
• Imo Singh	• Vinod Ganatra
• B. S. Lingadevaru	• Ashok Rane

Northern Region: (Bhojpuri, Dogri, English, Hindi, Punjabi, Rajasthani, Urdu)

• Major Ravi (Head)
• Kuldip Sinha	• Rahul Solapurkar
• Ashok Sharan	• Devendra Khandelwal

Eastern Region: (Assamese, Bengali, Odia and North-Eastern dialects)

• Vinod Ganatra (Head)
• Monalisa Mukherjee	• Namasrri
• Akashaditya Lama	• Suraj Kumar Duwarah

Western Region: (Gujarati, Konkani, Marathi)

• B. S. Lingadevaru (Head)
• Gyan Sahay	• Mahendra Teredesai
• Parag Chhapekar	• Neeraj Pathak

Southern Region I: (Malayalam, Tamil)

• Ashok Rane (Head)
• B. Divaker	• A. Karthik Raja
• Jayaram Kailas	• Shailesh Gupta

Southern Region II: (Kannada, Telugu)

• Imo Singh (Head)
• Malti Sahay	• M. K. Bhaskara Rao
• S. M. Patil	• B. Ramani

=== All India Award ===
==== Golden Lotus Awards ====
Official Name: Swarna Kamal

All the awardees were awarded with the 'Golden Lotus Award (Swarna Kamal)', a certificate and cash prize.

Award	Film	Language	Awardee(s)	Cash prize
Best Feature Film	Hellaro	Gujarati	Producer: Saarthi Productions LLP; Director: Abhishek Shah	₹ 250,000/- each
Best Debut Film of a Director	Naal	Marathi	Producer: Mrudhgandh Films LLP; Director: Sudhakar Reddy Yakkanti	₹ 125,000/- each
Best Popular Film Providing Wholesome Entertainment	Badhaai Ho	Hindi	Producer: Junglee Pictures Limited; Director: Amit Sharma	₹ 200,000/- each
Best Children's Film	Sarkari Hi. Pra. Shaale, Kasaragodu, Koduge: Ramanna Rai	Kannada	Producer & Director: Rishab Shetty	₹ 150,000/- each
Best Direction	Uri: The Surgical Strike	Hindi	Aditya Dhar	₹ 250,000/-

==== Silver Lotus Award ====
Official Name: Rajat Kamal

All the awardees were awarded with the 'Silver Lotus Award (Rajat Kamal)', a certificate and cash prize.

Award	Film	Language	Awardee(s)	Cash prize
Best Feature Film on National Integration	Ondalla Eradalla	Kannada	Producer: Umapathy Srinivas; Director: D Satya Prakash	₹ 150,000/- each
Best Film on Other Social Issues	Pad Man	Hindi	Producer: Hope Productions Pvt. Ltd; Director: R. Balki	₹ 150,000/- each
Best Film on Environment/Conservation/Preservation	Paani	Marathi	Producer:Purple Pebble Pictures; Director:Adinath Kothare	₹ 150,000/- each
Best Actor	Andhadhun	Hindi	Ayushman Khurrana	₹ 50,000/- each
Best Actor	Uri: The Surgical Strike	Hindi	Vicky Kaushal	₹ 50,000/- each
Best Actress	Mahanati	Telugu	Keerthy Suresh	₹ 50,000/-
Best Supporting Actor	Chumbak	Marathi	Swanand Kirkire	₹ 50,000/-
Best Supporting Actress	Badhaai Ho	Hindi	Surekha Sikri	₹ 50,000/-
Best Child Artist	Ondalla Eradalla	Kannada	P V Rohith	₹ 50,000/-
Best Child Artist	Naal	Marathi	Shrinivas Pokale	₹ 50,000/-
Best Child Artist	Harjeeta	Punjabi	Sameep Ranaut	₹ 50,000/-
Best Child Artist	Hamid	Urdu	Talha Arshad Reshi	₹ 50,000/-
Best Male Playback Singer	Padmaavat (For the song "Binte Dil")	Hindi	Arijit Singh	₹ 50,000/-
Best Female Playback Singer	Nathicharami (For the song "Maayavi Manave")	Kannada	Bindhu Malini	₹ 50,000/-
Best Cinematography	Olu	Malayalam	M. J. Radhakrishnan	₹ 50,000/-
Best Screenplay • Screenplay Writer (Original)	Chi La Sow	Telugu	Rahul Ravindran	₹ 50,000/-
Best Screenplay • Screenplay Writer (Adapted)	Andhadhun	Hindi	Sriram Raghavan, Arijit Biswas, Yogesh Chandekar, Hemanth Rao, and Pooja Ladha Surti	₹ 50,000/-
Best Screenplay • Dialogues	Tarikh	Bengali	Churni Ganguly	₹ 50,000/-
Best Audiography • Location Sound Recordist	Tendlya	Marathi	Gaurav Verma	₹ 50,000/-
Best Audiography • Sound Designer	Uri: The Surgical Strike	Hindi	Bishwadeep Chatterjee	₹ 50,000/-
Best Audiography • Re-recordist of the Final Mixed Track	Rangasthalam	Telugu	Raja Krishnan M.R	₹ 50,000/-
Best Editing	Nathicharami	Kannada	Nagendra Ujjani	₹ 50,000/-
Best Production Design	Kammara Sambhavam	Malayalam	Vinesh Banglan	₹ 50,000/-
Best Costume Design	Mahanati	Telugu	Indrakshi Pattanaik, Gaurang Shah and Archana Rao	₹ 50,000/-
Best Make-up Artist	Awe	Telugu	Ranjith	₹ 50,000/-
Best Music Direction • Songs	Padmaavat	Hindi	Sanjay Leela Bhansali	₹ 50,000/-
Best Music Direction • Background Score	Uri: The Surgical Strike	Hindi	Shashwat Sachdev	₹ 50,000/-
Best Lyrics	Nathicharami (For the song "Maayavi Manave")	Kannada	Manjunatha S. Reddy (ManSoRe)	₹ 50,000/-
Best Special Effects	K.G.F: Chapter 1	Kannada	Unifi Media	₹ 50,000/-
Best Special Effects	Awe	Telugu	Srushti Creative Studio	₹ 50,000/-
Best Choreography	Padmaavat (For the song "Ghoomar")	Hindi	Jyoti D. Tommar and Kruti Mahesh	₹ 50,000/-
Best Stunt Choreographer	K.G.F: Chapter 1	Kannada	Vikram More and Anbu Ariv	₹ 50,000/-
Special Jury Award	Kedara	Bengali	Indraadip Dasgupta	₹ 2,00,000/-
Special Jury Award	Hellaro	Gujarati	Shraddha Dangar, Shachi Joshi, Denisha Ghumra, Niilam Paanchal, Tarjani Bhadla, Brinda Nayak, Tejal Panchasara, Kaushambi Bhatt, Ekta Bachwani, Kamini Panchal, Jagruti Thakore, Riddhi Yadav, and Prapti Mehta	₹ 2,00,000/-
Special Mention	Nathicharami	Kannada	Sruthi Hariharan (Actress)	Certificate only
Special Mention	Kadhak	Hindi	Chandrachoor Rai (Actor)	Certificate only
Special Mention	Joseph	Malayalam	Joju George (Actor)	Certificate only
Special Mention	Sudani From Nigeria	Malayalam	Savithri Sreedharan (Actress)	Certificate only

=== Regional Awards ===
National Film Awards are also given to the best films in the regional languages of India. Awards for the regional languages are categorised as per their mention in the Eighth schedule of the Constitution of India. Awardees included producers and directors of the film. No films in languages other than those specified in the Schedule VIII of the Constitution were eligible.

Award	Film	Awardee(s)		Cash prize
Award	Film	Producer	Director	Cash prize
Best Feature Film in Assamese	Bulbul Can Sing	Flying River Films	Rima Das	₹ 1,00,000/- each
Best Feature Film in Bengali	Ek Je Chhilo Raja	SVF Entertainment Pvt. Ltd.	Srijit Mukherji	₹ 1,00,000/- each
Best Feature Film in Gujarati	Reva	Paresh Vora	• Rahul Bhole • Vinit Kanojia	₹ 1,00,000/- each
Best Feature Film in Hindi	Andhadhun	Viacom18 Motion Pictures	Sriram Raghavan	₹ 1,00,000/- each
Best Feature Film in Kannada	Nathicharami	M. Ramesh	ManSoRe (Manjunath S. Reddy)	₹ 1,00,000/- each
Best Feature Film in Konkani	Amori	Opus Ga La	Dinesh P. Bhonsle	₹ 1,00,000/- each
Best Feature Film in Malayalam	Sudani From Nigeria	• Sameer Thahir • Shyju Khalid	Zakariya Mohammed	₹ 1,00,000/- each
Best Feature Film in Marathi	Bhonga	Nalinee Productions	Shivaji Lotan Patil	₹ 1,00,000/- each
Best Feature Film in Punjabi	Harjeeta	Villagers Film Studio	Vijay Kumar Arora	₹ 1,00,000/- each
Best Feature Film in Tamil	Baaram	• Priya Krishnaswamy • Ardra Swaroop	Priya Krishnaswamy	₹ 1,00,000/- each
Best Feature Film in Telugu	Mahanati	Priyanka Dutt	Nag Ashwin	₹ 1,00,000/- each
Best Feature Film in Urdu	Hamid	Saregama India Limited	Aijaz Khan	₹ 1,00,000/- each

Best Feature Film in Each of the Language Other Than Those Specified In the Schedule VIII of the Constitution

Award	Film	Awardee(s)		Cash prize
Award	Film	Producer	Director	Cash prize
Best Feature Film in Pangchenpa	In The Land Of Poison Women	Aaas Productions	Manju Borah	₹ 1,00,000/- each
Best Feature Film in Rajasthani	Turtle	Shivazza Films & Entertainment	Dinesh S. Yadav	₹ 1,00,000/- each
Best Feature Film in Garo	Ma.Ama	Anna Films	Dominic Sangma	₹ 1,00,000/- each
Best Feature Film in Sherdukpen	Mishing	BB Entertainment Trade Private Limited	Bobby Sarma Baruah	₹ 1,00,000/- each

== Non-Feature Films ==
Short Films made in any Indian language and certified by the Central Board of Film Certification as a documentary/newsreel/fiction are eligible for non-feature film section.

=== Jury ===
A committee of seven, headed by cinematographer A. S. Kanal, was appointed to evaluate the Non-Feature Films entries. The jury members were:

• A. S. Kanal (Chairperson)
• Dhvani Desai	• Rajendra Mohapatra
• Chetan Mathur	• B. R. Srivatsa
• Vandana Kohli	• Atul Gangawar

=== Golden Lotus Award ===
Official Name: Swarna Kamal

All the awardees were awarded with the 'Golden Lotus Award (Swarna Kamal)', a certificate and cash prize.

Award	Film	Language	Awardee(s)	Cash prize
Best Non-Feature Film	Son Rise; The Secret Life of Frogs	Hindi; English	Vibha Bakshi Ajay Bedi & Vijay Bedi	₹ 150,000/- each
Best Director in Non-Feature Film	Feluda: 50 Years of Ray's Detective	Bengali	Sagnik Chatterjee	₹ 150,000/-

=== Silver Lotus Award ===
Official Name: Rajat Kamal

All the Awardees were awarded with the 'Silver Lotus Award (Rajat Kamal)' and a cash prize.

Award	Film	Language	Awardee(s)	Cash prize
Best First Non-Feature Film	Son Rise	Hindi	Vibha Bakshi	₹ 75,000/- each
Best Scientific Film	G. D. Naidu: The Edison of India	English		₹ 50,000/- each
Best Arts / Cultural Film	Bunkar - The Last of the Varanasi Weavers	English with Hindi	Satyaprakash Upadhyay	₹ 50,000/- each
Best Environment Film including Best Agricultural Film	The World's Most Famous Tiger	English	Subbiah Nallamuthu	₹ 50,000/- each
Best Promotional Film	Rediscovering Jajam	Hindi	Avinash Maurya, Kriti Gupta (Directors) Rachel Bracken Singh (Producer)	₹ 50,000/- each
Best Film on Social Issues	Taala Te Kunjee	Punjabi	Shilpi Gulati (Director) Simardeep Singh (Producer)	₹ 50,000/- each
Best Educational / Motivational / Instructional Film	Sarala Virala	Kannada	Ere Gowda	₹ 50,000/- each
Best Anthropological/Ethnographic Film				₹ 50,000/- each
Best Exploration / Adventure Film (including sports)	Swimming Through The Darkness	Bengali	Supriyo Sen	₹ 50,000/- each
Best Investigative Film	Amoli	English Hindi	Jasmine Kaur Roy Avinash Roy Sameer Pitalwalla	₹ 50,000/- each
Best Animation Film				₹ 50,000/- each
Best Short Fiction Film	Kharvas	Marathi	Aditya Suhas Jambhale	₹ 50,000/- each
Best Film on Family Welfare	Chalo Jeete Hain	Hindi	Mangesh Hadawale	₹ 50,000/- each
Best Cinematography	The Secret Life of Frogs	English	Ajay Bedi, Vijay Bedi	₹ 50,000/- each
Best Audiography	Children Of the Soil	Hindi	Bishwadeep Chatterjee	₹ 50,000/-
Best Audiography • Location Sound Recordist	The Secret Life of Frogs	English	Ajay Bedi	₹ 50,000/-
Best Editing	Son Rise	Hindi	Hemanti Sarkar	₹ 50,000/-
Best Music Direction	Jyoti	Marathi	Kedar Divekar	₹ 50,000/-
Best Narration / Voice Over	Madhubani: The Station Of Colour	Hindi	Urvija Upadhyay Deepak Agnihotri	₹ 50,000/-
Special Mention	Mahaan Hutatma; Glow Worm in a Jungle; Laddoo	Kannada; English; Hindi	Sagar Puranik; Ramana Dumpala; Sameer and Kishore Sadhwani	Certificate only

== Best Writing on Cinema ==
The awards aim at encouraging study and appreciation of cinema as an art form and dissemination of information and critical appreciation of this art-form through publication of books, articles, reviews etc.

=== Jury ===
A committee of three, headed by Utpal Borpujari was appointed to evaluate the nominations for the best writing on Indian cinema. The jury members were as follows:

• Utpal Borpujari (Chairperson)
• Mohan Raman	• Yatindra Mishra

=== Golden Lotus Award ===
Official Name: Swarna Kamal

All the awardees were awarded with the Golden Lotus Award (Swarna Kamal) accompanied with a cash prize.

Award	Book	Language	Awardee(s)	Cash prize
Best Book on Cinema	Mouna Prathanapole	Malayalam	Publisher: Kerala State Chalachitra Academy; Author: S. Jayachandran Nair	₹ 75,000/- each
Best Film Critic	N/A	• Malayalam • Hindi	• Blais Johnny • Anant Vijay	₹ 75,000/-
Special Mention (Book on Cinema)	In A Cult Of Their Own: Bollywood Beyond Box Office	English	Amborish Roychoudhury	Certificate Only
