= Harun-Arun =

- Directed by: Vinod Ganatra
- Written by: Dhiruben Patel
- Produced by: Children's Film Society, India; Vinod Ganatra
- Starring: Hemang Gor; Dhairay Gor; Swati Dave; Utkarsh Mazumdar
- Cinematography: A S Kanal
- Edited by: Kshitija Khandagale
- Music by: Paresh Jha; Ajay Singhania
- Release date: 2009
- Country: India
- Language: Gujarati

Harun-Arun is a 2009 Gujarati children's film directed by Vinod Ganatra and produced by Children's Film Society India. It stars Hemang Gor, Dhairay Gor and Swati Dave in lead roles. It won eight international awards.

== Cast ==
The cast was:

- Swati Dave
- Dhairya Gor
- Hemang Gor
- Ritu Gor
- Utkarsh Mazumdar
- Pramatesh Mehta
- Nilesh Mohite
- Hemang Mota
- Ragini
- Meet Thacker

== Plot ==
Harun, a Muslim Pakistani boy enters India via Kutch border from Gujarat. Accompanying him is his grandfather, looking for his best friend. Harun is adopted by a kind Hindu family as he gets separated from his grandfather. The family and other nationalists, who had accepted him mistaking his name to be Arun, a Hindu name, start questioning his intentions once his Pakistani roots are discovered.

== Production ==
Harun-Arun was produced by Children's Film Society India. It was shot in Kutch, Gujarat. The film is also set in Kutch with the backdrop of partition of India. The film depicts the innocence and the need for compassion for children who gets stuck in world affairs concerning religious fundamentalism and nationalism.

Dhiruben Patel wrote the story. Paresh Jha and Ajay Singhania composed the music and Kshitija Khandagale edited the film. A S Kanal was a cinematographer. Hemang Gor, son of a rickshaw driver, who was cast as a lead hailed from a village in Kutch.

== Awards ==
Harun-Arun won eight international awards. The film won the Light of Asia Award at the 2010 International Buddhist Film Festival, the Best Juvenile Audience Award at Dhaka International Film Festival, and the Liv Ullmann Peace Prize at Chicago International Children's Film Festival, Critics Jury Award at 2010 Transmedia, CIFEJ Jury Prize and Special Mention for Humanity Award by Children Jury at Rimouski International Film Festival, Audience Award at Freeze Frame International Film Festival. It was the opening film at the 29th Augsburg Children's Film Festival where it also won the Best Costume Award.
