= Baaram =

Indian film

- Theatrical release poster
- Directed by: Priya Krishnaswamy
- Written by: Priya Krishnaswamy
- Produced by: Priya Krishnaswamy; Ardra Swaroop
- Cinematography: Jayanth Sethu Mathavan
- Edited by: Priya Krishnaswamy
- Music by: Ved Nair
- Production company: Reckless Roses
- Release dates: November 2018 (IFFI); 21 February 2020 (India)
- Running time: 91 minutes
- Country: India
- Language: Tamil

Baaram (transl. The Burden) is a 2020 Indian Tamil-language film written, directed and edited by Priya Krishnaswamy. Produced by Priya Krishnaswamy and Ardra Swaroop under their banner, Reckless Roses, it won the National Film Award for Best Feature Film in Tamil in 2019, the only Tamil film to win at the 66th National Film Awards. It also won the Special Jury Award at the Pondicherry International Film Festival, 2019, and the Best Feature Film award at the South Asian Film Festival, Montreal, 2021. Baaram was presented by Grass Root Film Company and Vetri Maaran, and released in Indian theatres on 21 February 2020. In March 2020, it began streaming on Amazon Prime Video.

== Plot ==
Karuppasamy, a widowed night watchman, lives with his sister, Menmozhi, and three nephews – Veera, Mani and Murugan – in a small town in Tamil Nadu. One morning, while returning from his shift, he gets an accident and breaks his hip. His panicked nephews want him to be operated on in town, but his somewhat more distant son, Senthil, takes him to his ancestral village to be treated by a traditional healer. Eight days later, Karuppasamy dies. At his funeral, an old woman claims that Karuppasamy was murdered. Who killed Karuppasamy?

== Cast ==
- R. Raju as Karuppasamy
- Jayalakshmi as Menmozhi
- SuPa Muthukumar as Senthil
- P. Samanaraja as Murugan
- Bremnath V as Mani
- Stella Gobi as Stella
- Faridha as Murugan's wife
- Sugumar Shanmugam as Veera

== Production ==
After making her debut feature film, Gangoobai, Priya Krishnaswamy chanced upon news items regarding the practice of Thalaikoothal in online news portals. Upon further research, she realised that Thalaikoothal, a phenomenon she had never heard of before, was, in fact, an ongoing cultural practice which enjoyed social sanction in wide swathes of rural Tamil Nadu. Concerned with the burgeoning problem of an ageing population in India, and a complete lack of social and medical infrastructure to cater to the elderly, she wrote the script of Baaram in two weeks in mid-2016, and decided to produce the film herself, under her banner, Reckless Roses, in collaboration with Ardra Swaroop. Accordingly, they approached the Department of Performing Arts, Pondicherry University, where Priya conducted acting workshops, and succeeded in sourcing the main cast. Additional roles, numbering more than 80, were played by local non-actors. The film was shot in a realistic style akin to the Dogme school of cinema, with long takes, handheld shots and sync sound. No dialogue dubbing was done. It was shot in Pondicherry and Tirunelveli in 18 days in January 2017.

== Festivals and awards ==
Baaram premiered in November 2018 in the Indian Panorama section of the 49th International Film Festival of India (IFFI), Goa. It was also one of two Indian films nominated for the ICFT UNESCO Gandhi Medal at the IFFI, Goa, 2018. The ICFT UNESCO Gandhi Medal is an international competition section of IFFI that is evaluated by a jury in Paris. Baaram later won the National Film Award for Best Feature Film in Tamil at the 66th National Film Awards. It was released in Indian theatres on 21 February 2020.

== Critical reception ==
Cinestaan gave the film 4 out of 5 stars at the 49th IFFI, saying, "Baaram is a beautifully crafted social film which will make you question your own actions and rethink your stand on the grave subject of mercy killing." Haricharan Pudipeddi wrote in the Hindustan Times, 'In spite of making one quiver in their seat with its gut wrenching story which is inspired from a real incident, Baaram is a beautiful and relevant social film.' M. Suganth of The Times of India rated it 3 out 5. 'Behindwoods' rated it 3 out of 5 stars stating "Baaram is a hard-hitting film on a social issue that is rarely spoken about. Try not to miss". The New Indian Express rated it 3 out of 5 stars. The Indian Express rated it 3.5 out of 5 stars stating "Baaram is a necessary film that underlines the age-old heinous tradition, Thalaikoothal".Film Companion stated "The director keeps her distance. Like a diligent reporter, she is interested in (1) how thalaikoothal is organised, and (2) what you’d do if you knew someone was killed in this manner".
