= National Film Award – Special Mention (Book on Cinema) =

Indian film award

- National award for contributions to books on cinema
- Sponsored by: National Film Development Corporation of India
- First award: 1995
- Final award: 2020
- Most recent winner: • M T Anunahvangalude Pusthakam; • Kali Paine Kalira Cinema

Highlights
- Total awarded: 15
- First winner: • Alanti Chalanchitram; • Cinemachi Chittarkatha

The National Film Award – Special Mention (Book on Cinema) is one of the National Film Awards given by the National Film Development Corporation of India. Instituted in 1995 and awarded at 43rd National Film Awards.

The awards aim at encouraging study and appreciation of cinema as an art form and dissemination of information and critical appreciation of this art-form through publication of books, articles, reviews etc. All the award winners are awarded with Certificate of Merit.

== Winners ==
All the award winners are awarded with Certificate of Merit. Following are the winners over the years:

List of books, showing the year (award ceremony), language(s), author(s) and publisher(s)
Year	Book(s)	Language(s)	Authors(s)	Publisher(s)	Refs.
1995 (43rd)	Alanti Chalanchitram	Telugu	K. N. T. Sastry		
1995 (43rd)	Cinemachi Chittarkatha	Marathi	Ashok Rane		
1996 (44th)	No Award				
1997 (45th)	No Award				
1998 (46th)	Communication Cinema Development	English	Gaston Roberge		
1999 (47th)	Economic Aspects of Film Industry in Kerala	English	Uma J. Nair		
2000 (48th)	Such Is Life	English	Niranjan Pal		
2000 (48th)	Sangeet Ka Soundarya Bodh	Hindi	Uma Garg		
2001 (49th)	No Award				
2002 (50th)	No Award				
2003 (51st)	Kathapurush	Bengali	Niranjan Pal		
2003 (51st)	Chalanchitra Nirdeshaka	Kannada	P. N. Srinivas		
2004 (52nd)	No Award				
2005 (53rd)	No Award				
2006 (54th)	No Award				
2007 (55th)	No Award				
2008 (56th)	The Director's Mind	English	Ujjal Chakraborty		
2009 (57th)	Eka Studioche Atmavrutta	Marathi	Prabhakar Pendharkar		
2010 (58th)	Cinema Bhojpuri	English	Avijit Ghosh	Penguin Books	
2010 (58th)	Thiraicheelai	Tamil	Oviyar Jeeva	Trisakti Sundar Raman	
2011 (59th)	No Award				
2012 (60th)	No Award				
2013 (61st)	No Award				
2014 (62nd)	Pride of Tamil Cinema (1931–2013)	English	G. Dhananjayan		
2015 (63rd)	Forgotten Masters of Hindi Cinema	English	Satish Chopra		
2016 (64th)	A Fly in the Curry	English	K. P. Jayashankar		
2016 (64th)	A Fly in the Curry	English	Anjali Monteiro		
2017 (65th)	No Award				
2018 (66th)	In A Cult Of Their Own: Bollywood Beyond Box Office	Amborish Roychoudhury	English	Rupa Publications India	
2019 (67th)	Cinema Pahanara Manus	Ashok Rane	Marathi		
2019 (67th)	Kannada Cinema: Jagathika Cinema Vikasa-Prerane Prabhava	P. R. Ramadasa Naidu	Kannada		
2020 (68th)	M T Anunahvangalude Pusthakam	Anoop Ramakrishnan	Malayalam	Malayala Manorama	
2020 (68th)	Kali Paine Kalira Cinema	Surya Deo	Odia	Pakshighar Prakashani	
2021 (69th)	No Award				
2022 (70th)	No Award				
