= Taala Te Kunjee =

2017 Indian documentary film

- Film poster
- Directed by: Shilpi Gulati
- Produced by: JPS Bhatia
- Release date: 2017
- Running time: 1h 23min
- Country: India
- Languages: Punjabi, Hindi, English

Taala Te Kunjee (transl. Lock and Key) is a 2017 feature documentary written and directed by Shilpi Gulati that follows the journey of four former drug addicts and alcoholics from Amritsar, Punjab who are helping families recover from the rampant drug problem in the state. It was produced by JPS Bhatia. In 2019, the film was awarded the National Film Awards for Best Film on Social Issues and a cash prize of Rs. 50,000.

== People featured ==
- Jasbir Singh
- Tejinder Walia
- Gurpratap Singh

== Reception ==
Tarun Kumar of Firstpost states, "Taala Te Kunjee is an interesting portrayal of the process of recovery through the lives and stories of five men who are not only at varying stages in their own lives, but also at different stages of recovery."

== Awards ==
Year	Ceremony	Category	Result	Ref.
2018	66th National Film Awards	National Film Awards for Best Film on Social Issues	Won	
