= Harjeeta =

2018 Indian film by Vijay Kumar Arora

- Theatrical release poster
- Directed by: Vijay Kumar Arora
- Written by: Jagdeep Sidhu
- Produced by: Nick Bahl; Munish Sahni; Bhushan Chopra; Bhagwant Virk
- Starring: Ammy Virk; Sawan Rupowali; Sameep Ranaut; Pankaj Tripathi
- Cinematography: Rajeev Shrivastava
- Edited by: Bunty Nagi
- Music by: Gurmeet Singh
- Production companies: Sizzlen Productions; Malika Productions; Omjee Group; Villagers Film Studio
- Release date: 18 May 2018 (India)
- Running time: 129 minutes
- Country: India
- Language: Punjabi

Harjeeta is a 2018 Indian Punjabi-language sports-drama film written by Jagdeep Sidhu and directed by Vijay Kumar Arora. Co-produced by Sizzlen Productions, Malika Productions, Omjee Group, and Villagers Film Studio; it stars Ammy Virk, Sawan Rupowali, Sameep Ranaut, and Pankaj Tripathi. The film chronicles the story of Harjeet Singh, a field hockey player raised from poor family and captained Indian team in Junior World Cup. The film was released on 18 May 2018. The film got positive reviews from critics but was a commercially unsuccessful. Harjeeta won two National Film Awards for Best Punjabi Film and Best Child Actor (Ranaut).

== Plot ==
Raised in a poor, dysfunctional home, a young man Harjeet Singh (Ammy Virk) dreams of winning the World Cup in field hockey. The film starts out in a Kabaddi field, where Harjeet Singh, lovingly called Tully by his friends and family, is clearly the star and captain of his Kabaddi team. His father, whom Harjeet affectionately calls Bapu, is happily cheering him on the sidelines. Harjeet's team effortlessly wins and he gets dishes as a reward. While walking back home, his father wonders to Harjeet what if he had received cash prize instead of dishes.

== Cast ==
- Ammy Virk as Harjeet Singh/Tuli
  - Sameep Ranaut as Young Harjeet Singh/Tuli
- Pankaj Tripathi as Coach
- Sawan Rupowali as Arpan
- Raj Jhinger as a Big Brother of Harjeeta
- Gurpreet K Bhangu
- Parkash Gadu
- Sukhi Chahal
- Jarnail Singh
- Pukhraj Bhalla as Manpreet
- Amberdeep Singh as special appearance as coach

== Release ==
The film was released theatrically on 18 May 2018.

=== Home media ===
It is available on Chaupal.

== Soundtrack ==
Harjeeta’s soundtrack is composed by Gurmeet Singh while background score is composed by Raju Singh. It was released by record label Lokdhun Punjabi on 12 May 2018 at iTunes and other platforms. Song “Kinna Pyaar” sung by Mannat Noor was well received by audience, and as of August 2019 it has been viewed over 33 million times on YouTube.

== Reception ==
Director Vijay Kumar Arora’s Harjeeta creates a comfortable space for itself without having to worry about any other movies that have been made on the same topic—hockey.

— Jasmine Singh, The Tribune

Jasmine Singh of The Tribune gave four stars out of five. Singh praised Arora's direction and Jagdeep Sidhu’s story, and described it as “fine balance of emotions, drama, romance and comedy“. She also praised performance by Sameep Ranaut, said, “It is Sameep who prepares the perfect ground for the young Tuli. Sameep delivers an award-winning performance and so does the young Tuli [Ammy Virk].” Singh praised performances by Virk, Gurpreet Bhangu, Parkash Gadhu, Pankaj Tripathi, Sawan Rupowali, and Raj Jhinjer. In last added, “Harjeeta is a fine example of a good story, good direction, good acting, good music, together in one team, heading for a goal...And goal it is for team Harjeeta!”

== Accolades ==
Year	Ceremony	Category	Result	Ref.
2018	66th National Film Awards	National Film Award for Best Child Artist	Won	
2018	66th National Film Awards	National Film Award for Best Feature Film in Punjabi	Won	
