= Pride of Tamil Cinema =

Book by G. Dhananjayan

Pride of Tamil Cinema: 1931–2013
- Author: G. Dhananjayan
- Language: English
- Subject: Tamil cinema
- Genre: Non-fiction
- Published: 21 November 2014
- Publisher: Blue Ocean Publishers
- Publication place: India
- Media type: Print
- Pages: 594
- ISBN: 978-93-84301-05-7
- OCLC: 898765509

Pride of Tamil Cinema: 1931–2013 is a book by the Indian film historian and producer G. Dhananjayan, detailing information about the production and release of 163 Tamil-language films that were released between 1931 and 2013. It was released on 21 November 2014 by Blue Ocean Publishers during the 45th International Film Festival of India and received widespread critical acclaim. The book won the National Film Award – Special Jury Award / Special Mention (Book on Cinema).

== Development and writing ==
Pride of Tamil Cinema: 1931–2013 is G. Dhananjayan's second book after The Best of Tamil Cinema: 1931–2010. His first book, which details Tamil-language films that made landmarks and set trends in the cinema, was met with some negative response from filmmakers since they felt that their films deserve to be included in it. By March 2011, after the book's publication, Dhananjayan had started researching for updating it. While working on it, he found many Tamil films that received national and international recognition, and thought that he could write another book on those films. He then searched for all Tamil films winning the National Film Awards and screened at the Indian Panorama (Note: Indian Panorama is a flagship component of the IFFI under which the best of contemporary Indian films are selected for the promotion of film art.) section of the International Film Festival of India; the total was 163.

== Release and reception ==
Pride of Tamil Cinema: 1931–2013 was released on 21 November 2014 by Blue Ocean Publishers at the 45th International Film Festival of India. The Secretary of Ministry of Information and Broadcasting Bimal Julka praised Dhananjayan's effort to compile all National Film Award-winning Tamil-language films in the book. It received the National Film Award – Special Jury Award / Special Mention (Book on Cinema).
