= Bunkar: The Last of the Varanasi Weavers =

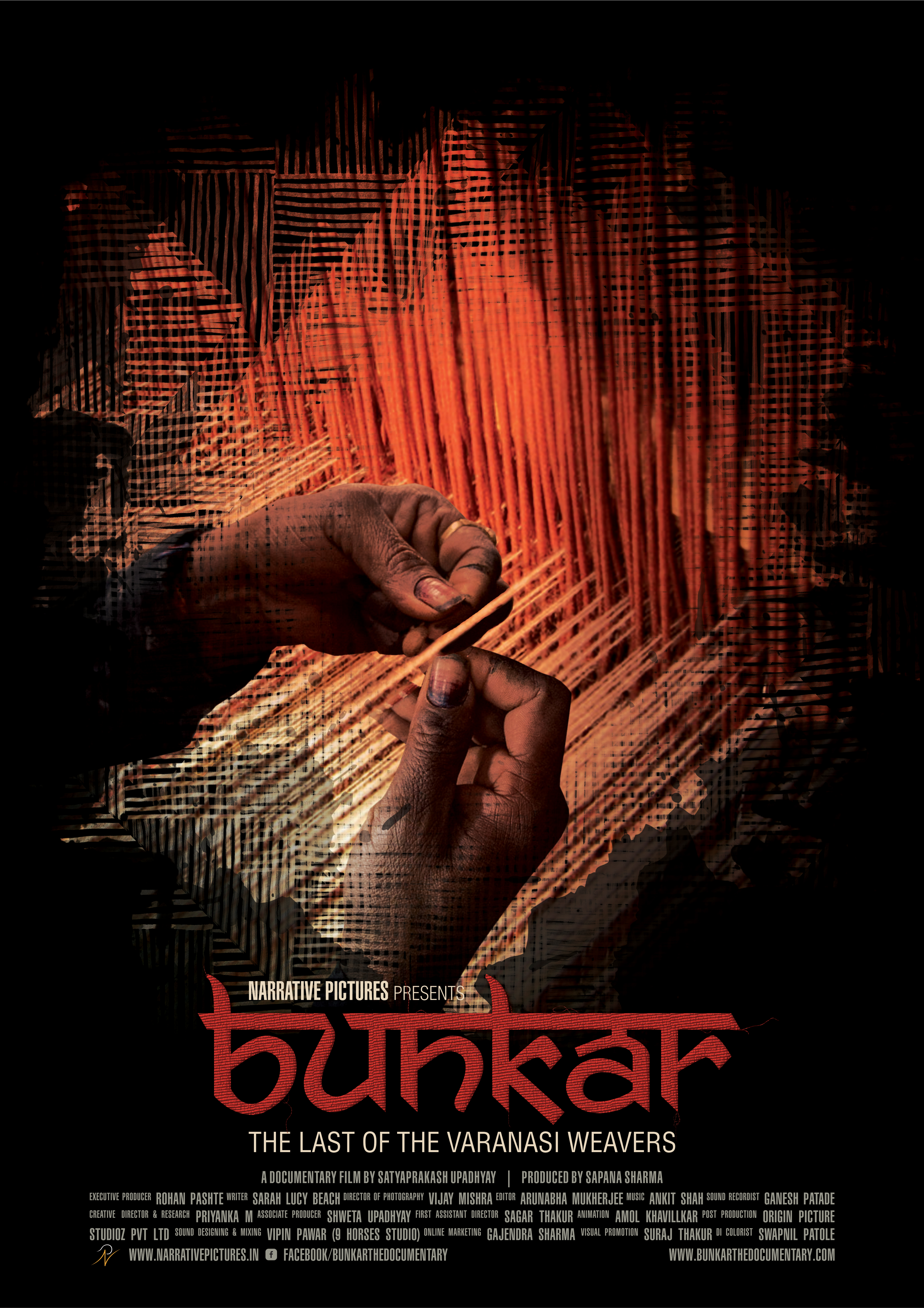
- Directed by: Satyaprakash Upadhyay
- Story by: Sarah Lucy Beach
- Produced by: Sapana Sharma
- Cinematography: Vijay Mishra
- Edited by: Arunabha Mukherjee
- Music by: Ankit Shah
- Release date: 2018
- Running time: 67 minutes
- Country: India
- Language: English

Bunkar: The Last of the Varanasi Weavers is an Indian documentary that focuses on the lives of the weavers of Varanasi. It was directed by Satyaprakash Upadhyay. It showcases the nuances of the handloom sector in Varanasi, what makes it stand out from other handloom products and the issues that affect its artisans. The film was made in 2018 and had its world premiere in the Indian Panorama at 49th International Film Festival of India in Goa. The film's director, Satyaprakash Upadhyay, has also won Best Debutante Director (Documentary) Award at Jaipur International Film Festival (JIFF) 2019. It won "Best arts and culture film" in the 2018 National Film Awards.

== Background ==
Varanasi or Kashi is known to have been, and continues to be a famous weaving center for luxury textiles. The Varanasi handloom sector has been in a state of decline, and has been the subject of efforts to revive it by the government of India.

== Story ==
Bunkar: The last of the Varanasi Weavers is a documentary that focuses on the lives of the weavers of Varanasi. It highlights the various nuances of the handloom sector in Varanasi, what makes it stand out from other handloom products and the issues that plague its artisans.

The weaving traditions of Varanasi can be traced back to the Vedic times and have since been handed down from generation to generation. Not a skill that can be taught in any institution, weaving is an art that takes a lifetime of dedication to master. The weavers of Varanasi pride themselves in being able to weave with precision almost anything that the human mind can imagine. But, an art of this prominence comes at a price. Aspirant artisans start their training at the age of 10 and often even sacrifice all forms of formal education so they can perfect their talents.

With cheap powerloom fabrics rapidly making their way into our wardrobes, the weavers and their families stand at a cross roads. As they shoulder the responsibility of safeguarding centuries of tradition, they also crave the benefaction from society that they once enjoyed. Having to compete on cost, without willing to compromise on the quality of their art, the preservers of our heritage are struggling to hold on to their vocation and dignity. Bunkar is an attempt to awaken society to the reality of the life of a weaver and the price he pays so that our Indian legacy lives for one more day.

While celebrating the weaves of Varanasi and their creators, the documentary compels us to rethink the role each one of us can play in making a difference to their lives. For every time that art has played its role in shaping society, today an art is calling out to us. If we do not step up now, we may lose it forever.

== Accolades ==
- Screened at Indian Panorama in IFFI 2018
- Won Best Debutant Director (Documentary) at Jaipur International Film Festival 2019
- Won Best Indian Feature Film at Banaras Film Festival 2019
- Official Selection at the Indo-German Film Week 2019, Berlin
- Won Best Film (Arts & Culture) at 66 National Film Awards, India
