= Children's Film Society, India =

Indian government organization

Children's Film Society India
- Abbreviation: CFSI
- Formation: 11 May 1955; 71 years ago
- Purpose: Children entertainment, production and distribution
- Headquarters: Films Division Complex, 24, G. Deshmukh Marg, Mumbai – 400,026
- Region served: India
- Chairperson: Mukesh Khanna till Feb 2018
- Parent organisation: Ministry of Information and Broadcasting
- Website: Official website

Children's Film Society India (CFSI) was a nodal organisation of Government of India that produced children's films and various TV programs in various Indian languages. Established in 1955, CFSI functioned under the Ministry of Information and Broadcasting, Government of India and was headquartered in Mumbai.

In March 2022, it was merged with National Film Development Corporation.

== History ==
The concept of an exclusive cinema for India's children was mooted by its first Prime Minister Jawaharlal Nehru, and Children's Film Society, India (CFSI) was founded on 11 May 1955 with Hriday Nath Kunzru as its first president. The first film produced by CFSI was Jaldeep (1956), an adventure film directed by Kidar Sharma also starring Mala Sinha.

The Chairperson of CFSI was selected for a duration of three years, and over the years, several notable personalities have remained Chairperson of CFSI including Sai Paranjpye (twice), Nafisa Ali (2005–2008), Nandita Das (2008–2012), Amol Gupte (2012–2015) and Mukesh Khanna (2015–2018).

In March 2022, four government-run film and media units including Children's Film Society merged with National Film Development Corporation (NFDC).

== Activities ==
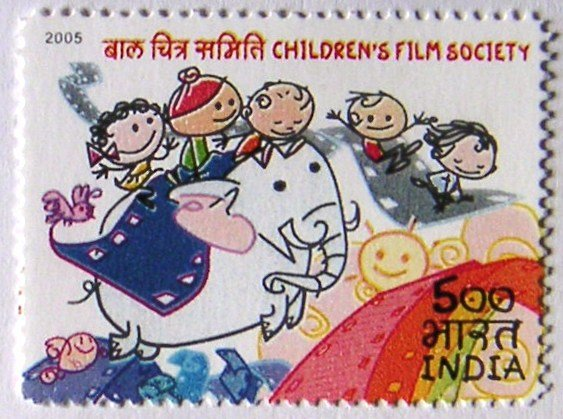
Children Film Society on Indian Postage stamp 2005

CFSI produced feature films and short films for children in various languages of India. It organised subsidised shows and distributed film prints. In the last 52 years CFSI had made 114 feature films, 45 short animations, 9 puppet films, as well as 52 short documentaries and news magazines. CFSI also organised an International Children's Film Festival held every alternate year in India. The films produced by CFSI had participated in many film festivals all over the world and had won many awards.

== Selected filmography ==
Year	Title	Notes
1956	Jaldeep	Hindi film, First CFSI film
1962	Bapu Ne Kaha Tha	Hindi Film
1965	Jaise Ko Taisa	Hindi Film
1975	Charandas Chor	Hindi film
1978	Ganga Bhavani	Telugu Film, Nandi Award for Second Best Children Film
1991	Potli Baba Ki	(TV puppet series)
1996	Halo	Hindi film, National Film Award for Best Children's Film, Filmfare Critics Award for Best Movie
2002	Baaja	Hindi film
2003	Heda Hoda (The Blind Camel)	Hindi film, Silver Elephant Award – 13th International Children's Film festival, Hyderabad – India – 2003. 2nd Prize – Vancouver Film Festival – Canada – 2004, Opening Film – Hamburg Film Festival – Germany – 2004, Silver Awards – La Matatena Film Festival – Mexico – 2004, Special Mention – Cine Jeune De Laon film Festival – France – 2004, Silver Awards – Cairo Film Festival – Egypt – 2005, Bronze Remi Award – Worldfest Film Festival – USA – 2005, Indian Panorama – International Film festival, Goa – India – 2005, My favorite Film Award – Ningbo Shanghai Film Festival – China – 2005.
2006	Lilkee	Hindi film
2007	Mahek	Hindi film
2007	Amoolyam	Telugu Film, Nandi Award for Best Children Film
2007	Manpasand – the Perfect Match	Animation Film, Gold Remi Award, 41st World Fest Houston USA 2008, Bronze World Medal 2008 New York Film Festival, USA, Indian Documentary Producers' Association, IDPA, India Silver Award 2008, Diploma Prix Danube Award Bratislava, Slovakia 2008
2009	Putaani Party	Kannada film, National Film Award for Best Children's Film
2009	Harun-Arun	Gujarati film
2011	Gattu	Special Mention at 62nd Berlin International Film Festival

== See also ==
- National Film Development Corporation of India (NFDC)
