= Cherub of the Mist =

- Directed by: Naresh Bedi
- Produced by: Naresh Bedi; Rajesh Bedi
- Edited by: Ajay and Vijay Bedi
- Release date: 2006
- Running time: 53 minutes
- Country: India

Cherub of the Mist is a documentary film based on the life of two red pandas, Mini and Sweety, who were released into the Singalila National Park in the Darjeeling District, India. The documentary was filmed by Naresh and Rajesh Bedi over 2 years and followed Indian biologist Dr. Sunita Pradhan who at that time had been studying red pandas for over 10 years. It was the first time that someone had filmed the rare red pandas in their natural habitat and shows the animals in courtship, mating, nest building, and the rearing of cubs. The documentary was later adapted into an episode of Mutual of Omaha's Wild Kingdom titled Return of the Firecat. Ajay and Vijay Bedi, the sons of Naresh, were nominated for a News & Documentary Emmy Award for best editing for the episode.

== Awards ==
- 29th International Wildlife Film Festival, 2006
  - Best Conservation & Environmental Award- Won
- 28th Annual News & Documentary Emmy Awards, 2007.
  - Nomination for Outstanding Individual Achievement in a Craft: Editing – Ajay Bedi & Vijay Bedi

== See also ==
- Singalila National Park
