= Lilkee =

Lilkee is a 2006 children's film in Hindi produced by Children's Film Society, India, and directed by Batul Mukhtiyar. The film is about a 10-year-old domestic help in Mumbai. and was released on 5 October 2006.

== Plot ==
It is a story of a girl named Lilkee girl from the mountains of Nainital. Like all other girls from the poor families, Lilkee is expected to work and earn. Lilkee is brought to Mumbai by Bela for housework. Lilkee gets involved in household chores and takes care of Bela's child. Even though she falls under the weight of a routine, she misses Nainital. In Mumbai, Lilkee finds a few friends to play with. However, they soon realize she is a housemaid. And how her sense of responsibility makes her employer to admit her in school is the remaining story.

== Cast ==
- Aiman Mukhtiyar
- Anushka Panwala
- Saloni Joshi
- Anushka Joshi
- Md. Mukhtiyar
- Suresh Bhatia
- Nazneen Madan

== Festivals ==
In 2009, it was shown as a part of the 'Sadak Chhap Film Fest', a street film festival for children in Bangalore. It also screened at the 'Filmi Chashma Film Festival', at National Film Archive of India, Pune in 2011.
