= Amoli (film) =

2018 Indian film by Jasmine Kaur Roy & Avinash Roy

Amoli: Priceless
- Poster of documentary
- Directed by: Jasmine Kaur Roy, Avinash Roy
- Produced by: Sameer Pitalwalla
- Narrated by: Vidya Balan
- Music by: Tajdar Junaid
- Release date: 30 May 2018 (India)
- Running time: 30 minutes
- Country: India
- Languages: English; Hindi

Amoli: Priceless is a 2018 English-Hindi documentary film on commercial sexual exploitation of children. The film is directed by Jasmine Kaur Roy and Avinash Roy and produced by Sameer Pitalwalla. The music was scored by Tajdar Junaid. Vidya Balan narrated the documentary. The narration for the film is in English while the interviewees speak in Hindi. The film was released in May 2018.

The documentary was dubbed in several languages featuring the voices of: Rajkummar Rao (Hindi), Sachin Khedekar (Marathi), Jisshu Sengupta (Bengali) Nani (Telugu), Kamal Haasan (Tamil), and Puneeth Rajkumar (Kannada) lent their voices to the film.

The film won the 66th National Film Award for Best Investigative Film. The jury citation for the award reads "For its gritty examination of why and how young girls are coerced into commercial sex work, destroying their lives and minds, and for depicting their courage to survive."

== Voice artistes ==
Nararators	Languages	Notes
Vidya Balan	English	
Rajkummar Rao	Hindi	Dubbed versions
Sachin Khedekar	Marathi	Dubbed versions
Jisshu Sengupta	Bengali	Dubbed versions
Nani	Telugu	Dubbed versions
Kamal Haasan	Tamil	Dubbed versions
Puneeth Rajkumar	Kannada	Dubbed versions
