= Kaash (2015 film) =

- Directed by: Ishaan Nair
- Screenplay by: Ishaan Nair
- Produced by: Irrfan Khan
- Starring: Nidhi Sunil; Kavya Trehan; Varun Mitra; Kalki Koechlin
- Release date: 24 October 2015 (Tokyo International Film Festival)
- Running time: 106 minutes
- Country: India
- Language: Hindi

Kaash (English: If Only) is a 2015 Indian Hindi-language drama film written and directed by Ishaan Nair. Produced by Irrfan Khan, it features Nidhi Sunil, Kavya Trehan, and Varun Mitra in pivotal roles. Actress Kalki Koechlin makes cameo appearance as a French born hippie in the film. The film premiered at the 2014 Tokyo film festival.

== Plot ==
Frustrated with his dwindling relationship, Aadil, a dreamy young photographer, spontaneously sets off to meet a girl he has connected with over the vast universe of the Internet. Far from the urban dystopia of Bombay he falls into Khushali's simple world of earthly delights. In her, he finds strains of Samira, as she was and as she has become.

== Cast ==
- Nidhi Sunil as Samira
- Kavya Trehan as Khushali
- Varun Mitra as Aadil
- Kalki Koechlin (cameo)
