= Jasmine Kaur Roy =

Indian filmmaker

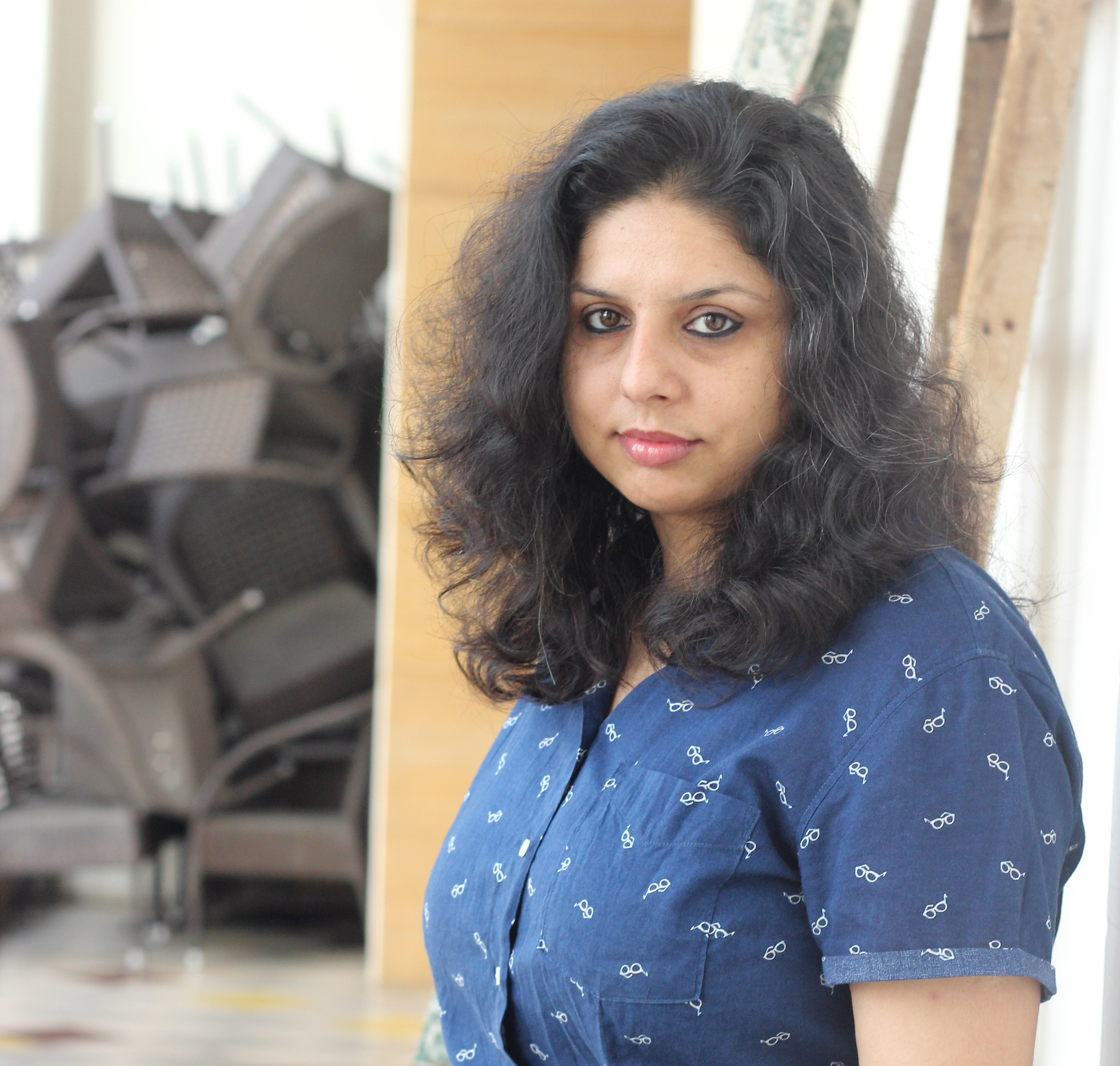
- Education: L.S.R. F.T.I.I.
- Occupation: Filmmaker
- Awards: Two National Film Awards

Jasmine Kaur Roy is a two time National Award-winning independent filmmaker from India, making short films and documentaries with Avinash Roy, under their banner Wanderlust Films. Her film Amoli is a documentary about the commercial sexual exploitation of children in India. The film won the 66th National Film Award for Best Investigative Film for the year 2018.

== Education ==
Jasmine graduated in Political Science (Hons.) from Lady Shri Ram College for Women, New Delhi and later specialized in Film Direction from the Film & Television Institute of India, Pune. She was also selected to be a part of Berlinale Talents 2015 as a participant director.

== Career ==
Jasmine has made short films and documentaries. Some of her films like Saanjh, Meena and Scavenging Dreams have won awards and have been screened at several international film festivals. She is the recipient of the 52nd National Film Award (Best Film on Family Welfare) for her short film 'Saanjh' and the 66th National Film Award (Best Investigative Film) for her documentary film Amoli. Her short film Raavi (2022) had its world premiere at the New York Indian Film Festival 2022.

=== Amoli ===
Her 30-minute documentary film Amoli was produced by The Culture Machine and released online in May 2018. Amoli is a documentary about the commercial sexual exploitation of children in India. The film is narrated by Rajkummar Rao (Hindi), Vidya Balan (English), Kamal Haasan (Tamil), Puneeth Rajkumar (Kannada), Jisshu Sengupta (Bengali) and Nani (actor) (Telugu) and the music is by Tajdar Junaid.

Amoli won the 66th National Film Award for Best Investigative Film for the year 2018.

== Filmography ==
- Scavenging Dreams
- Meena
- Saanjh (short film)
- Amoli (2018) (documentary)
- Raavi (Short film, 2022)
