= The Secret Life of Frogs =

2018 Indian documentary

- Directed by: Ajay Bedi, Vijay Bedi
- Narrated by: Jeff Alan Greenway
- Distributed by: Animal Planet
- Release date: 1 May 2019
- Running time: 45 minutes
- Country: India

The Secret Life of Frogs is a 2019 Indian documentary film that explores lesser-known frog species. It premiered on 1 May 2019, on Animal Planet. Directed by Ajay Bedi, Vijay Bedi, and narrated by Jeff Alan Greenway, the 45-minute film provides insights into the behaviors and lives of various frog species, with a particular focus on the purple frog and the torrent frog.

The documentary was screened at the 7th Woodpecker International Film Festival on 30 November 2019 and awarded the National Film Award for Best Non-Feature Film: Sunrise at the 66th National Film Awards.
