= Vinod Ganatra =

Indian filmmaker

- Citizenship: Indian
- Occupations: Film director, producer, screenwriter
- Known for: Work in children's cinema and family-oriented films in India
- Awards: More than 36 national and international awards

Vinod Ganatra is an Indian film director, producer, and screenwriter, known for his work in children's cinema and family-oriented films in India. He has created approximately 400 documentaries, produced 25 TV programs and received more than 36 national and international awards. He has been associated with initiatives promoting quality children's content in Indian cinema and served as a member of the central panel of the jury and head of the eastern panel of the jury at the 66th National Film Awards, He has also been a part of the jury at the 60th Maharashtra State Film Awards.

== Career ==
Ganatra is known for his work in children's cinema and family-oriented films in India. He has created approximately 400 documentaries, produced 25 TV programs and received more than 36 national and international awards. He has been associated with initiatives promoting quality children's content in Indian cinema and served as a jury of over a 100 national, regional and international film festivals, including the 66th National Film Awards, He has also been a part of the jury at the 60th Maharashtra State Film Awards.

He became the first Indian filmmaker to receive the Liv Ullmann Peace Prize, in Chicago.

In 2026, he was appointed as a jury member at the 12th China International Children's Film Festival

== Selected filmography ==
- Heda Hoda
- Harun-Arun
- Gubbachigalu
- Lukka Chhuppi

== Awards ==
Gantara has received more than 36 national and international awards.

In 2024, he received the Nelson Mandela Lifetime Achievement Award of South Africa for his contribution to films at the 7th Nelson Mandela Children's Film Festival.

His 2009 Gujarati language children's film Harun-Arun won eight international awards.
