= Lakshmi Rebecca =

Indian entertainer

- Born: 1981 (age 44–45); Hyderabad, Telangana, India
- Education: Sheffield Hallam University
- Organization: Red Bangle
- Website: http://redbangle.in/

Lakshmi Rebecca is a talk show host, director, producer and former model.

Lakshmi founded Red Bangle, a film production house, in 2011. In the same year, she also launched an online talk show called The Lakshmi Rebecca Show. The show, which has received over 3 million views, features change makers in India.

Lakshmi recently launched a YouTube series titled India Ahead, a short film series featuring stories of progress from India. She has a background in film making, social research, marketing and anchoring as well as a modelling.

== Red Bangle ==
Red Bangle makes advertising films, corporate videos, animated films, branded content for the web and documentary films among other video content.

== Chai with Lakshmi ==
Chai with Lakshmi is the first of its kind in India. An award-winning talk show with 125 episodes. It is in English and features a variety of social entrepreneurs and change makers in India.

== Early life ==
Originally from Hyderabad, Lakshmi Rebecca has spent a large part of her childhood in Chennai. She did her schooling at Holy Angels School, Chennai. She went on to attend Stella Maris College, which she discontinued midway to pursue missionary and social work.

In 2004, Lakshmi was one of the 16 finalist on the first season of modelling reality-show, Get Gorgeous.

In 2007, Lakshmi earned an MSc in International Marketing from Sheffield Business School, Sheffield Hallam University, UK. She also earned an ACIM qualification from the Chartered Institute of Marketing, UK.

Lakshmi later became a social researcher who contributed to documentary films for the BBC, Discovery and Channel 4, a marketer who undertook a considerable number of market research and consulting projects, and a model who walked the ramp for some of India's renowned designers and brands.

Between the years of 2008 and 2012, she taught marketing at Sheffield Business School, Oxford College of Marketing and at Christ University.

== Achievements ==
Lakshmi Rebecca's talk show Chai with Lakshmi recently became a WSA nominee, a UN initiated award for the best in global e-content. The show has also won the Manthan award, the Indi Blogger award and the Rotary BSE-SME award.
