= Chai with Lakshmi =

YouTube talk show

Chai with Lakshmi is an online YouTube talk show with a viewership of nearly 3 million. The show is produced by Red Bangle, and is directed and anchored by Lakshmi Rebecca. It has nearly 125 episodes.

The first episode of this original web series was published on 11 July 2011.

== Overview ==
Chai with Lakshmi is an online talk show, in which host Lakshmi Rebecca speaks to individuals over a cup of chai. The show focuses on Indian idea-tors and change makers who are positively shaping India for the future.

The show released its first episode on 11 July 2011. It has since completed three seasons and is currently on its fourth. Each episode runs between 8 and 13 minutes with the aim to hold the short attention span of the web user. Chai with Lakshmi is produced by Red Bangle, which is based in Bangalore.

== Lakshmi Rebecca ==
Lakshmi Rebecca is a marketer and model turned anchor and entrepreneur. She holds an MSc in International Marketing from Sheffield Business School and further qualifications from the Chartered Institute of Marketing, UK. She has consulted for businesses in the UK and in India, and has taught marketing at business schools. She has also worked on documentary films for the BBC, Discovery and Channel 4.

== Inclusive India ==
Inclusive India is a nonprofit campaign by Chai with Lakshmi that aims to inspire millions of Indian to be inclusive. The stories collected will be posted online on the show's website. The project aims to raise awareness about Indians and projects in India that are inclusive in nature, and make development possible for everyone.

== Awards and accolades ==
The Manthan Award is a South-Asia and Asia-Pacific level award for digital initiatives. Chai with Lakshmi won this award in December, 2012, in the E-News and Media category.

The Rotary BSE-SME Awards are given away at an annual event to encourage small and medium enterprises across the country. Lakshmi Rebecca received the Woman Innovator Award in January, 2013 for her work with Chai with Lakshmi.
