= Naresh Bedi =

Indian filmmaker

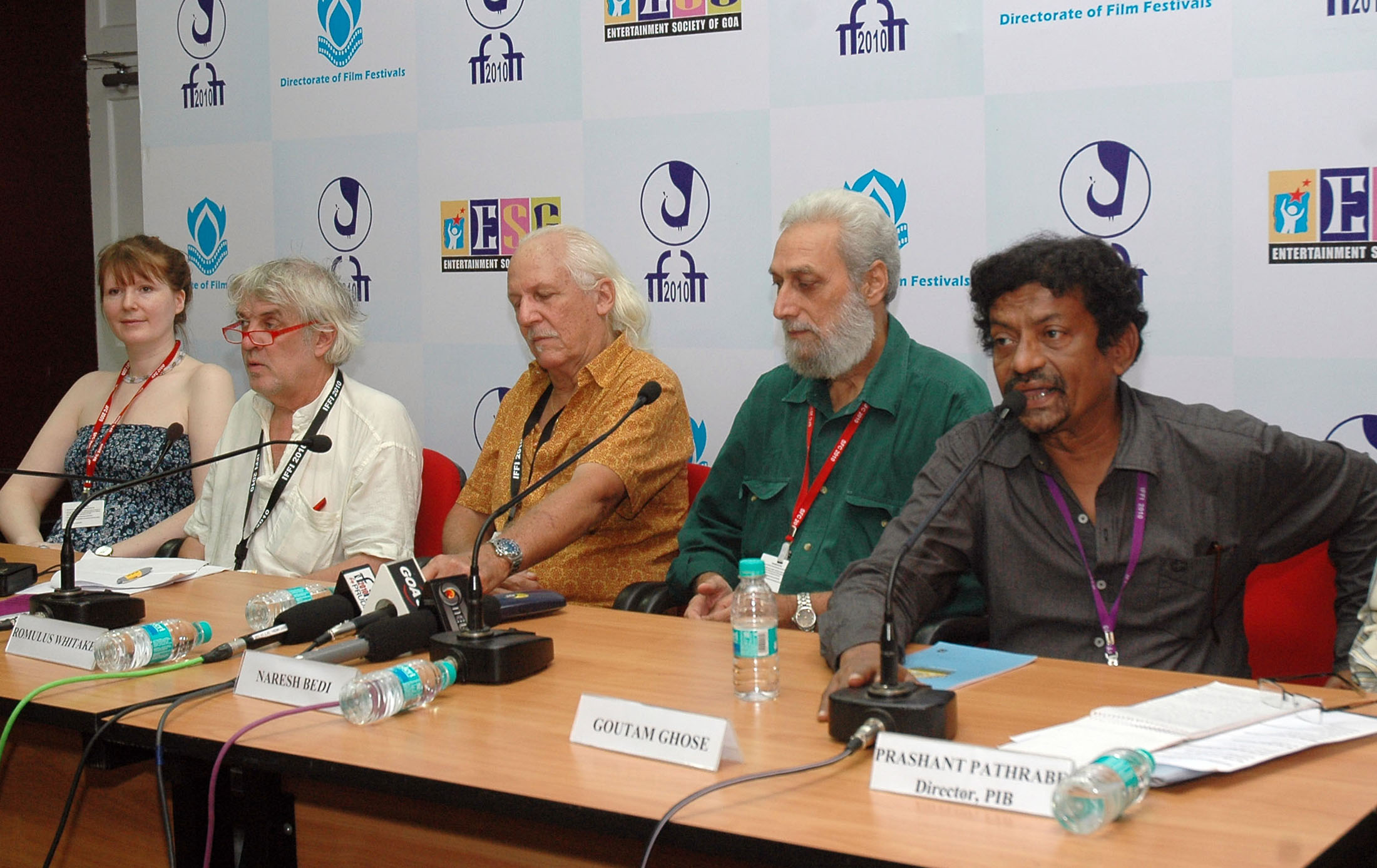
- Naresh Bedi (right), IFFI (2010)
- Born: Haridwar, Uttarakhand, India
- Occupations: Filmmaker, photographer
- Known for: Documentary & wildlife films
- Children: Ranjana, Rajiv Bedi, Ajay Bedi; Vijay Bedi
- Parent: Dr. Ramesh Bedi
- Awards: Padma Shri; Wildscreen Panda Award; Earth Watch Award; CMS-UNEP Prithvi Ratna Award; Eastman Kodak Award; Classic Telly Award; International Wildlife Film Festival Award; Wildlife Asia Award; International Wild Track Africa Award; Whale Award
- Website: www.bedibrothers.com

Naresh Bedi is an Indian filmmaker, the eldest of the Bedi Brothers and a member of the second generation of three generations of Wildlife photographers and filmmakers. He is the first Asian to receive a Wildscreen Panda Award and the first Indian to receive a wildlife film nomination for the British Academy Film Awards. He was honoured by the Government of India in 2015 with Padma Shri, the fourth highest Indian civilian award.

== Biography ==
...Wild life filmmaking is indeed a good profession to pursue. But one has to be driven by passion. But if someone has money on mind, then I would rather suggest not taking up this profession, says Naresh Bedi.

Naresh Bedi was born in Haridwar in the present day Indian state of Uttarakhand, to Ramesh Bedi, a wildlife photographer and author of 74 books on the subject. He started developing an interest in photography from an early age and along with his younger brother, Rajesh Bedi, pursued the interest with a Rolleicord camera, presented by their father. His passion helped him to cover an official visit by Jawaharlal Nehru while he was only in his teens and had his first exhibition at the age 19, sponsored by Max Mueller Bhavan, the Indian wing of Goethe-Institut.

Bedi is a graduate from the Film and Television Institute of India, Pune with a gold medal for the best all round performance. One of his first ventures was the coverage of Connaught Place and the zoo in New Delhi, focusing on the feeding of animals there. The film was bought by Doordarshan for an amount of US$ 1800. Later, a chance meeting with Bert Haanstra, the renowned Dutch filmmaker, at a cricket match in Kanpur, fetched him the opportunity to film a few portions of Haanstra's film, Ape and Super Ape.

Naresh Bedi joined with his brother Rajesh in the 1970s and shot several projects for National Geographic, Stern and Geo before making a film, Cobra – The Snake God, which was bought by BBC and Discovery Channel. The next venture, Flying Prince of Wildlife, BBC production, followed the steps of Prince Bernhard of the Netherlands, a known wildlife enthusiast, and had the Prince making appearance and Richard Attenborough handling the narration. A few more films, two on tiger, one each on elephants, wild dogs and snow leopards, followed before the film, The Ganges Gharial was made in 1983. The film fetched him the Wildscreen Panda Award for the best cinematography in 1984 and was also screened at the Centenary Film Festival 2013.

Bedi's films have been aired by several notable television channels such as BBC, Channel4, Canal Plus and the Discovery Channel. Their work, Sadhus: India's Holy Men, was premiered on BBC. He has worked with renowned filmmaker, Mira Nair, on her film, Monsoon Wedding, as the cinematographer of the second unit. His other mainstream engagements were with Richard Attenborough for a 50-minute promotional film shot for the biopic, Gandhi and with David Lean for a promotional film for A Passage to India. His documentary, Cherub of the Mist, is reported to be the first conservation film about the red panda.

Bedi is reported to have filmed several rare wildlife moments such as the first recording of the reproduction of gharials, nursing, multiple mating and leopard hunting of tigers and breeding of bar-headed geese. He has filmed Tibetan and Indian wild dogs (dholes), Himalayan lynx and snow leopard for the first time. He is also known to have made innovative accessories like a 10 feet tripod for filming predatory animals. Criticisms have also surfaced with Bedi being accused of shooting a captive tiger for a scene showing the animal in water.

Bedi is credited with six books, co-authored by his brother, Rajesh Bedi, such as India's Wild Wonders, apart from several films he has produced so far. His sons, Ajay Bedi and Vijay Bedi, are filmmakers in their own rights, taking the trade to the third generation. They were nominated for the Emmy Awards in its 28th edition for Editing and have won the Wildscreen Panda Award in 2004 for their film, The Policing Langur.

== Filmography ==
- Bij de beesten af (Ape and Super Ape) (1972) – Movie Documentary – additional cinematographer
- Flying Prince of Wildlife (1975) – Documentary – cinematography
- Gandhi – (1982) – Promotional film – additional cinematographer for the promotional short film for the Richard Attenborough feature film, Gandhi.
- The Ganges Garial (1983) – Documentary – cinematographer, producer
- A Passage to India (1984) – Promotional film – cinematographer for the David Lean film, A Passage to India.
- The Healing Arts (1986) – TV Series documentary – (1 episode: Alamelu's Illness – cinematographer
- Questar Animals in the Wild: Elephant, Lord of the Jungle (1987) – Documentary – director
- Saving The Tiger (1987) – Documentary – director
- Man – Eating Tiger (1987) – Documentary – director
- Whistling Hunter (1989) – Documentary – director
- Cobra – The Snake God – Documentary – director
- Ganesh – The Elephant God (1990) – Documentary – director
- Ladakh -The Forbidden Wilderness – Documentary – director
- Ladakh -Desert in the Skies (1995) – Documentary – director
- Sadhus: India's Holy Men (1995) – Documentary – cinematographer, producer
- The Peacock Spring (1996) – Feature film – additional cinematographer
- Earth Story (1998) – TV Series documentary – cinematographer
- Kumbha Mela (2001) – TV Movie documentary – cinematographer
- Animals of the Ocean Desert (2001) – TV Movie documentary – additional cinematographer
- Monsoon Wedding (2001) – director of photography: second unit
- Mutual of Omaha's Wild Kingdom (2006) – TV Series documentary – one episode: Return of the Fire Cat – additional cinematographer, writer, producer and director
- Beyond the Forest (2007) – Documentary short – actor as self
- The Forest (2009) – Feature film – additional cinematographer for the wildlife scenes.
- Cherub of the Mist (2009) – Documentary – director, producer

== Awards and recognitions ==
Naresh Bedi is a recipient of the Earth Watch Award of National Geographic Society and Eastman Kodak Award. He received the Wildscreen Panda Award, popularly known as the Green Oscars, in 1984, for his cinematography for the documentary, The Ganges Gharial, the first Asian to receive the award. In 1987, two of his films, Saving The Tiger and Man-Eating Tiger, won nominations, though unsuccessfully, for the British Academy Film Awards, making him the first Indian to receive a wildlife film nomination in the British Academy of Film and Television Arts awards. He was awarded the Prithvi Ratna Award by the Centre for Media Studies and United Nations Environment Programme in 2005. Cherub of the Mist, the first film on the conservation of red panda, received 15 awards including three Classic Telly Awards, Wild Screen Panda Award, International Wildlife Film Festival Award, Wildlife Asia Award and International Wild Track Africa award. He has also won the Whale Award at the Wildlife Asia Film Festival, Singapore for his contribution to wildlife films. The Government of India awarded him the civilian honour of Padma Shri in 2015.

== See also ==
- Bert Haanstra
- Ape and Super Ape
- Monsoon Wedding
- Cherub of the Mist
- Vijay Bedi
