= Nidhi Sunil =

Indian lawyer, model and actress

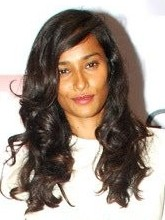
- Sunil in 2021
- Born: 1987 or 1988 (age 38–39); Kochi, Kerala, India
- Occupations: lawyer; actress; model
- Years active: since 2009
- Agent: Premium Models Paris

Nidhi Sunil (born 1987/1988) is an Indian lawyer, model, and actress. Nidhi was born in Kerala and is known for her role as Samira in the Indian drama film Kaash (2015 film). Nidhi is a previous recipient of Vogue India's Model of the year award, and is one of L’Oréal's global ambassadors.

== Career ==
In 2007, Nidhi competed in season four of Get Gorgeous and was placed second runner up. After that, she started her career as a model for national and international magazines like Vogue, QG, and Elle in India. She started her career as an actress in Bollywood with a drama film Gangoobai. In 2015, she appeared in his second film of career, Kaash. She has done campaigns for Garnier, The Gap, forever 21, esprit, and featured in magazines including Italian Vogue, Indian Vogue, Harpers Bazaar, Elle Magazine and GQ.

In 2017, she was selected for Nu Muses calendar and posed completely nude.

Nidhi is signed to Premium model Management Paris and Elite New York. In February 2021, Nidhi was named L’Oréal's newest global ambassador and was awarded Vogue India's model of the year 2021

== Filmography ==
Year	Title	Role
2013	Gangoobai	Monisha
2015	Kaash	Samira

== Discography ==
Year	Song	Release date
2012	Brown Rang	28 February 2012
2018	Makhna	21 December 2018
