= Kavya Trehan =

Indian creative artist

Kavya Trehan is a creative artist from New Delhi, known from her participation in the indie-pop duo Mosko and her appearance in various television and film shows. Most notably she has featured in TV series The Royals, which premiered on Netflix in 2025.

She studied drama at the National School of Drama, and subsequently studied psychology at Lady Shri Ram College. Her film appearances include Kaash / If Only (2015), Hush Hush, and Jugaadistan, as well as the short films First Time (2015) and Shewolf (2021).
