= Sameep Ranaut =

Indian actor

- Born: Sameep Singh Ranaut
- Occupation: Actor
- Years active: 2018–present
- Known for: Harjeeta

Sameep Singh Ranaut is an Indian actor from Punjab. He is best known for his child roles as young Harjeet Singh in Harjeeta and Gagan in Uda Aida. He also won Best Child Artist award at 66th National Film Awards for his debut role in Harjeeta.

== Career ==
Ranaut made his acting debut with the film Harjeeta (2018). He did not give any auditions for the film in fact he was discovered by Sawan Rupowali playing hockey where she recorded Ranaut's audition clip.

== Filmography ==
Key
†	Denotes films that have not yet been released

Year	Film	Role	Notes
2018	Harjeeta	Young Harjeet Singh	
2018	Qismat	Child Artist	
2019	Uda Aida	Gagan	
2019	Guddiyan Patole	Kash's Nephew	
2019	Rabb Da Radio 2	Teji	
2019	Ardaas Karaan	Amar	
2021	Tunka Tunka	Fateh (as a child)	
2021	Moosa Jatt	Moosa (as a child)	
2023	Mastaney	Young Qalandar	

== Awards and nominations ==
- Won Best Child Artist award at 66th National Film Awards for Harjeeta (2018)
