= Vikram Bawa =

Indian photographer

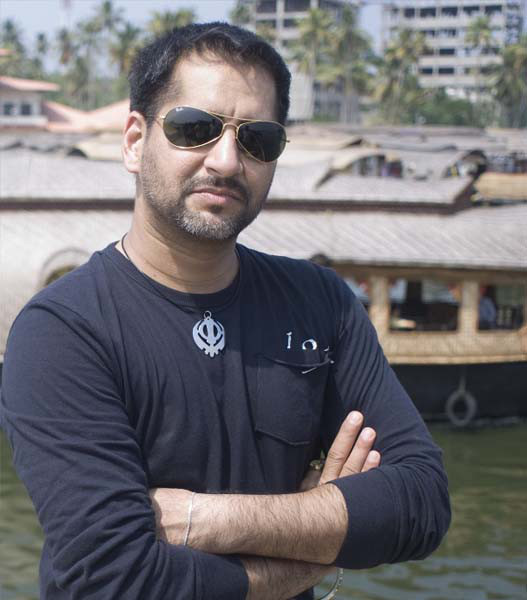
- Born: Vikram Singh Bawa
- Style: Advertising; Fashion; Photography
- Website: Official website

Vikram Bawa is an Indian fashion, advertising and landscape photographer based in Mumbai. He made 3D photography in the late 1990s.

== Early life and education ==
Bawa was born in Delhi. He moved with his parents to Mumbai at an early age. He went to Green Lawns High School, Mumbai. He started photography as a hobby when he was 16 years old, inspired by his parents. Bawa graduated in maths from Elphinstone College, Mumbai. He started work as the managing director of a chemical firm at age 18.

== Life and work ==
In 1996, he started photography professionally. He has photographed Bollywood celebrities; and made commercial work for various brands. He produced a fashion calendar on the theme of Draupadi for 2014 in Mumbai. He has also directed music videos and a film called Yahaan Gandhi Bikta Nahin, a short film on Gandhi in present that has been part of a traveling exhibition to art galleries in India. He has made fashion films for various commercial clients.

== Exhibitions ==
=== Solo exhibitions ===
- The Other Side, Gallery Art and Soul, Mumbai, India, November 2012.

=== Group exhibitions ===
- Articulate 2011: An Exhibition of Contemporary Photography, Saffronart, London, October 2011

== Collections ==
Bawa's work is held in the following permanent collections:

- Priyasi Art Gallery
- Gallery Art and Soul, Mumbai, India
- Jindal Art Foundation
- Alfaz Miller Collection

== Recognition and awards ==
Nicknamed as "Master of Gimmicks" in the world of fashion photography, Vikram has won awards from Masters Cup, Prix de la Photographie Paris, The International Color Awards, Spider Awards, Asian Photography Most Influential Photographer Award, and PIEA Award.

- Vikram received four international awards for his Leela Palace Goa hotel campaign
- Vikram's fashion film The Long Show was nominated for the International Fashion Film Awards (IFFA) 2014 for Best Art Direction and Best Music Nomination
- He was judged as the "2nd best photographer at the PMA International Awards, USA" for his 3D photography. The images were part of a 30-country travelling exhibition.
