= Freeze Frame International Film Festival =

The Freeze Frame International Film Festival is an annual film festival, which takes place in Winnipeg, Manitoba, Canada. The festival presents an annual program of children's films, in both English and French, at the Franco-Manitoban Cultural Centre.

The festival was launched in 1996 by filmmaker Pascal Boutroy, soon after he moved to Winnipeg from Montreal. Boutroy remains the festival's artistic director as of 2020.

In addition to film screenings, the festival includes a program of amateur filmmaking workshops for children.
