= Vijay Bedi =

Indian filmmaker

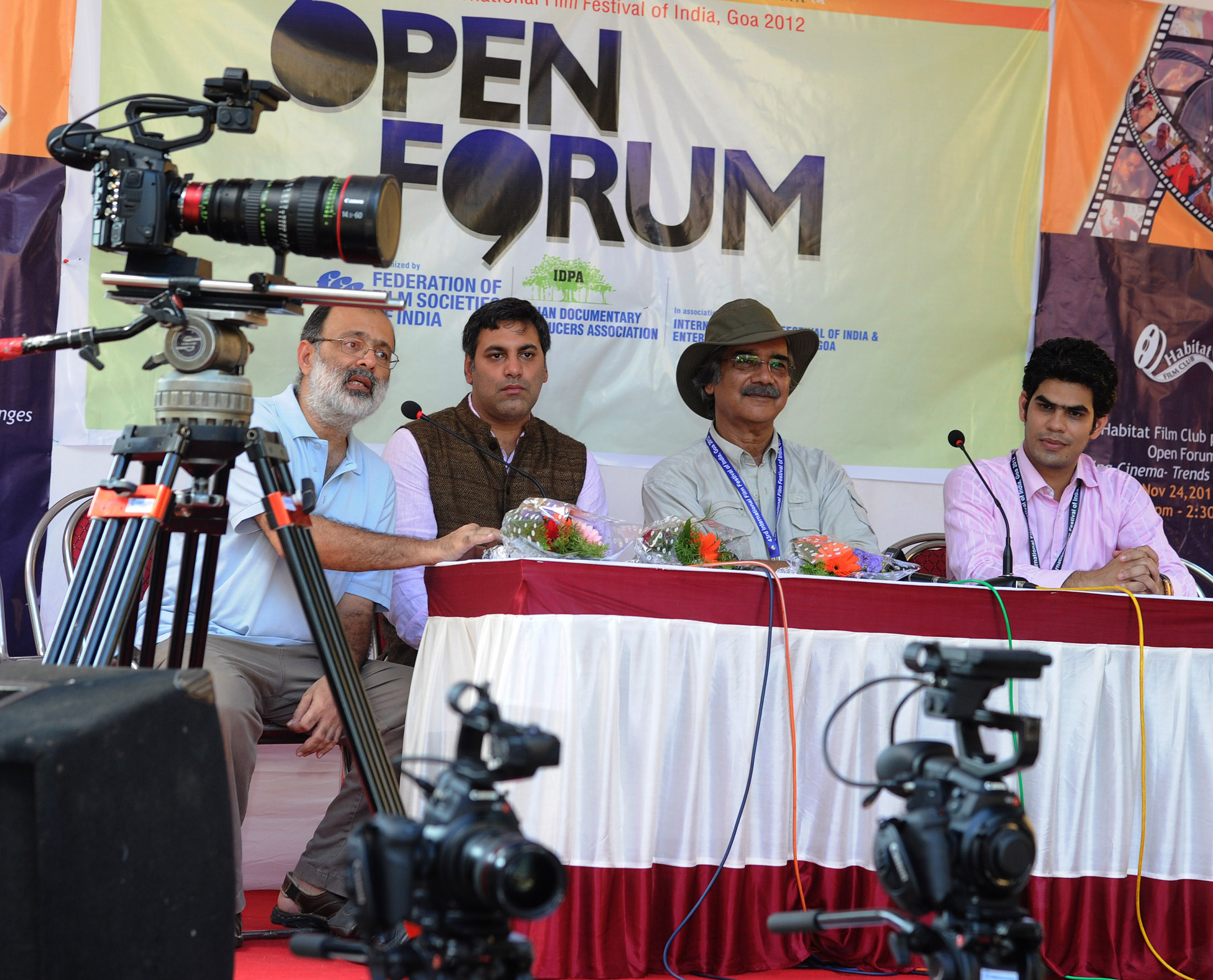
- Bedi (right), at IFFI, 2012
- Occupations: Film maker, photographer
- Spouse: Bahar Dutt
- Father: Naresh Bedi

Vijay Bedi is a wildlife film maker and photographer.

He has worked with various national and international channels like CNN International, Aljazeera English, Canadian Television, BBC, Channel 4 Television, Doordarshan, PBS Now, TF1 French Channel, ZDF Channel, National Geographic, Discovery Channel and Discovery Science Channel.

Vijay Bedi & his twin brother Ajay Bedi are the youngest Asians to have won the Green Oscar for their films – The Policing Langur.

Ajay Bedi & Vijay Bedi are also the only Indians to have won a nomination at the television highest awards at Emmy Academy of Television Arts & Sciences.

Vijay & Ajay are the sons of Naresh Bedi, a world renowned wildlife conservationist. He is the first Asian to receive a Wildscreen Panda Award and the first Indian to receive a nomination for the British Academy Film Awards. He was honoured by the Government of India in 2015 with Padma Shri, the fourth highest Indian civilian award.

In 2005, the film Policing Langur by Vijay Bedi and Ajay Bedi was also selected for the second edition of the Wildlife Film Festival hosted in Nandan (Kolkata). Sourced from National Geographic Society, Discovery Channel, Bedi Films, and Romulus Whitaker, over 40 films participated in the festival.

Their documentary, The Policing of the Langur, made in 2009 was nominated as the best film in the Newcomers Category at Wild Screen Film Festival. Trained in movie making at the Aurobindo Institute of Mass Communication, New Delhi, the duo won the Green Oscars for their documentary film on the life of two endangered Himalayas's Red pandas called the Cherub of the Mist. "Our documentary captures the colourful vista of man-monkey relationship in India, dating back to mythological times. It is a captivating tale of veneration, tolerance and co-existence," said Vijay and Ajay. When asked about wildlife photography, the twin brothers said, "It can expose environmental problems and encourage people to care.

Vijay Bedi worked as one of the nominating jury members for the First Frame 2013 – Fifth International Students' Film Festival on 19 and 20 March 2013. "The talent was enormous. This film festival is a very good opportunity for youngsters as it provides a great launch pad for them," said Vijay to The Hindu.

== Films ==
- Cherub of the Mist
- The Secret life of Frogs
- Film for Conservation
- NZZ Format: Wenn Bilder Tiere Retten - Die Geschichte der Bedi-Bruder
- Clean & Green Energy
- Melting Paradise
- Gharial Crisis
- Wild Adventure with Bedi Brothers – 13 x half-hour programmes
- Echoes from the Jungle – 13 x half-hour programmes
- The Policing Langur
- Monsoon Wedding
- The Forest
- Inshallah, Kashmir
- The Marathon Boy

== Awards ==
- 67th National award film festival for Best environment film, The Stork Saviours, Vijay Bedi & Ajay Bedi
