= Mickey Mehta =

Indian life coach (born 1962)

Dr. Mickey Mehta
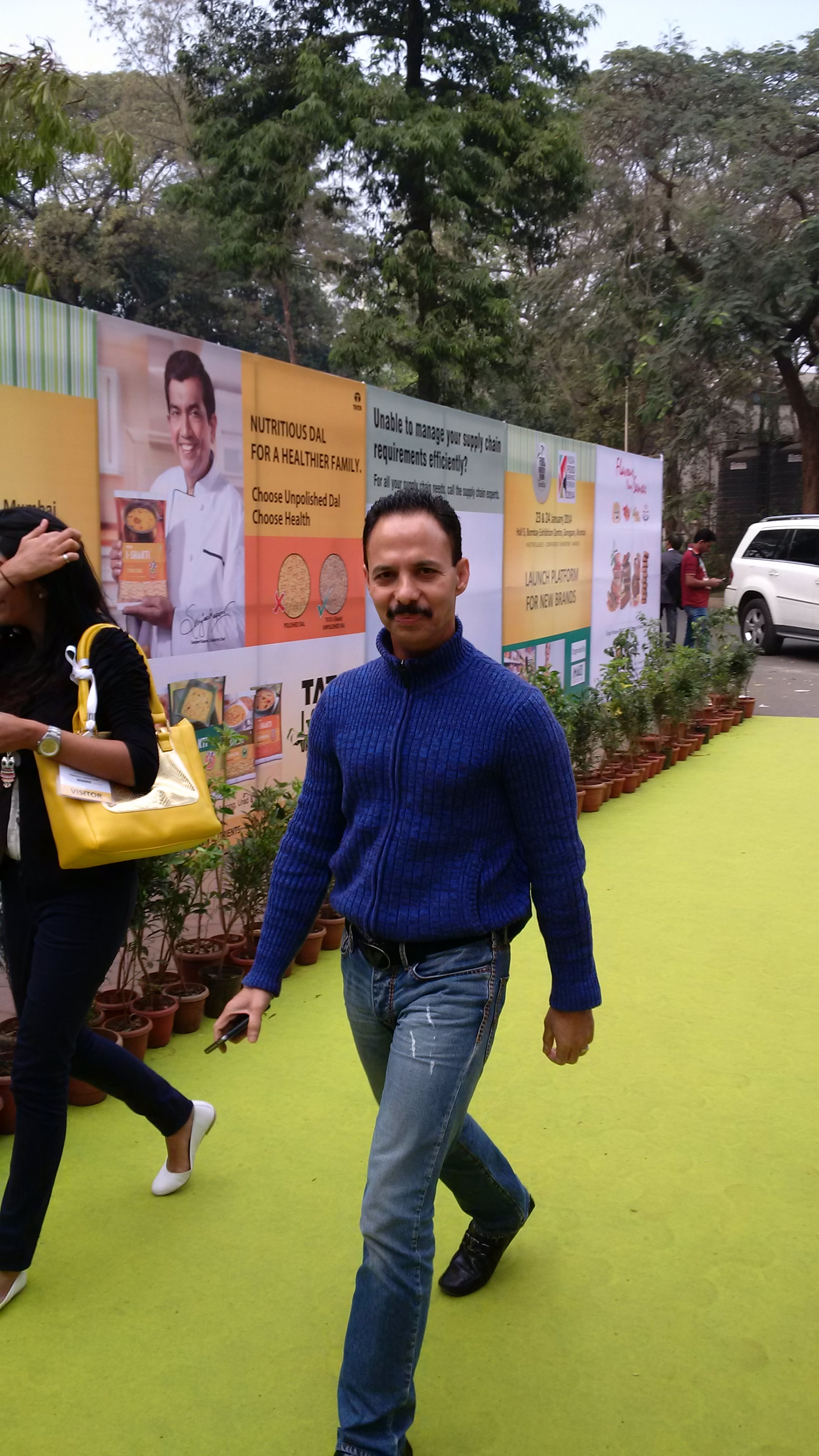
- Mickey Mehta attending a wellness seminar
- Born: August 29, 1962; Mumbai, Maharashtra
- Known for: Holistic health, yoga, equipment-free Yo workouts, health and fitness coach

Mickey Mehta (born 29 August 1962) is a Life Coach.

== Personal life ==
Rohinton Mehta was born into a middle-class Parsi family. His father worked as a banker, and his mother served as a secretary. He was raised in Grant Road, Mumbai. He completed his education at Bhonsala Military School in Nashik, Maharashtra, India.

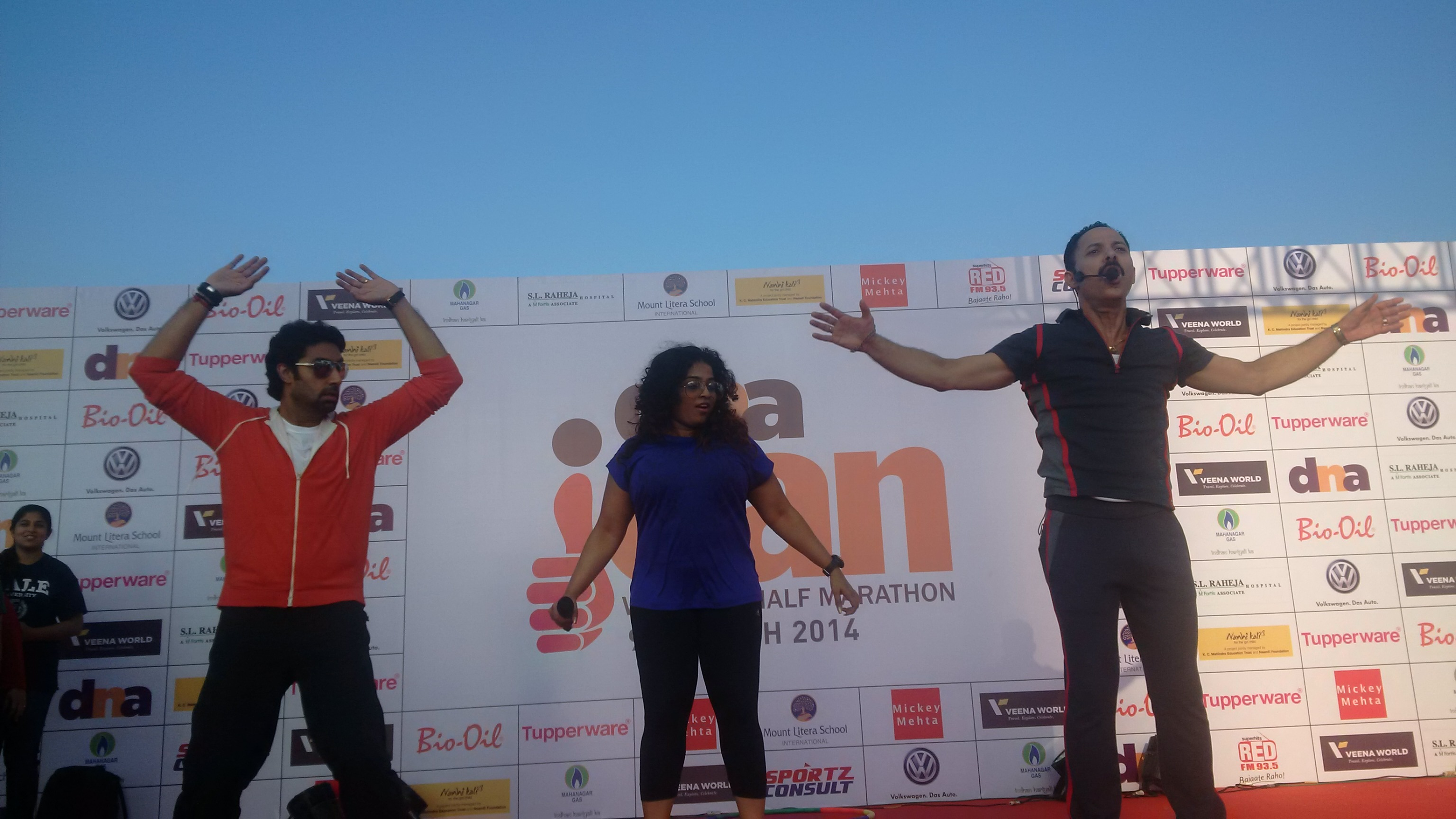
Mickey Mehta (right) and Abhishek Bachchan (left) at the Dna iCan Women's Marathon held at Bandra Kurla Complex on 9 March 2014

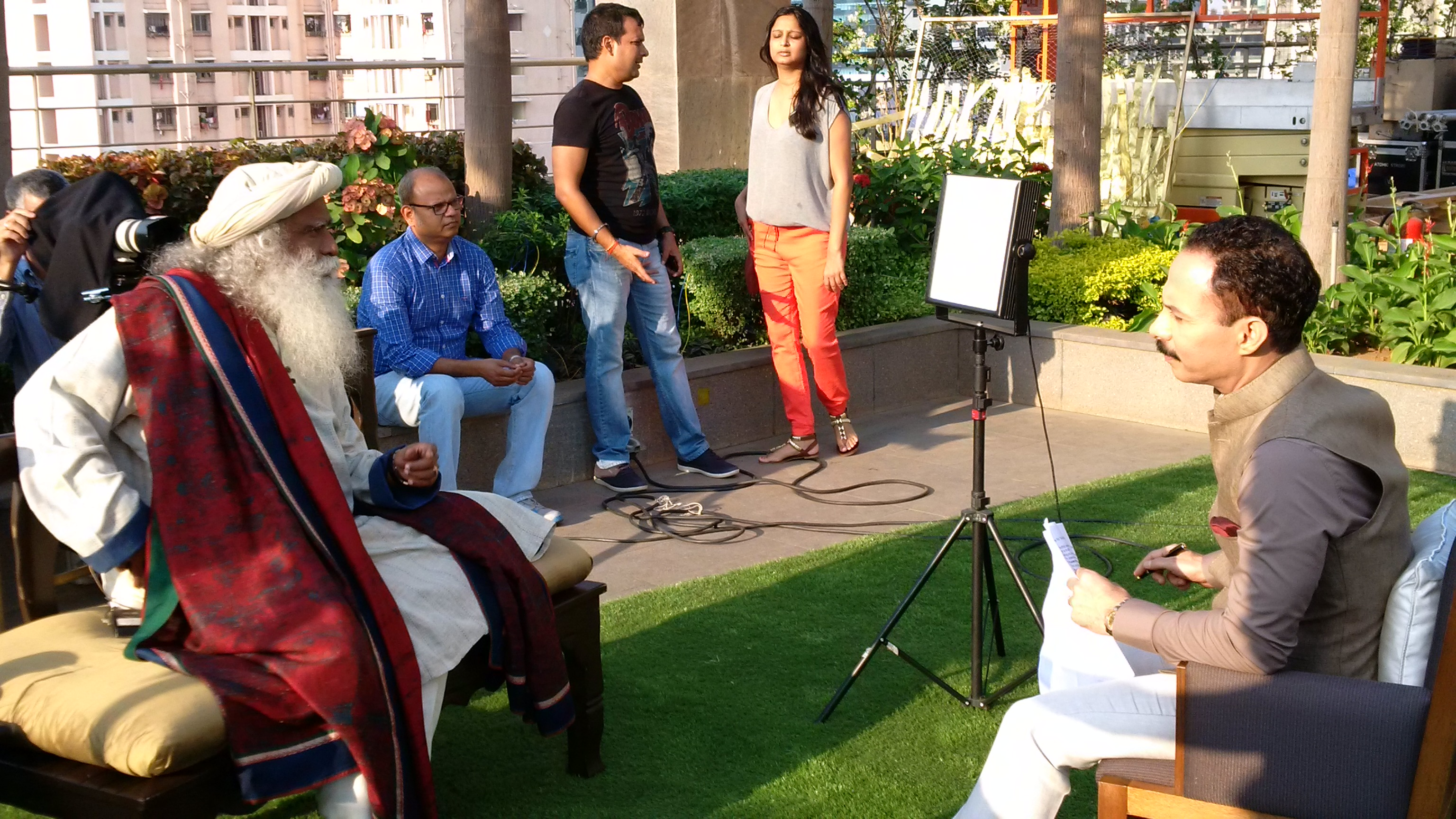
Mickey Mehta interviewing Jaggi Vasudev at the Palladium Hotel, Mumbai on 29 March 2014

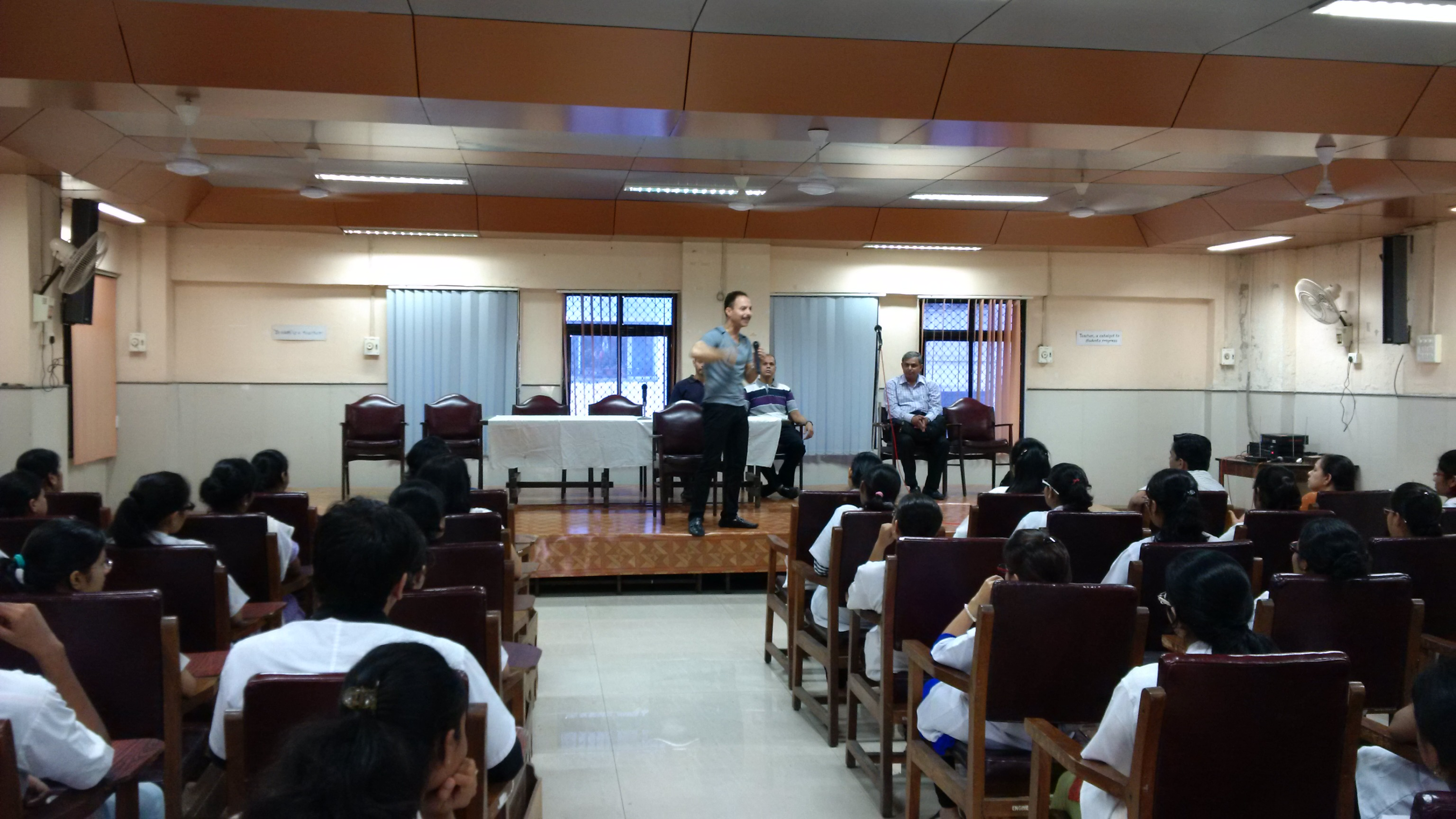
Mickey Mehta addressed doctors on the subject of 'Medicine Cures, Nature heals' at the Nair Dental College on 7 April 2014

== Career ==
He began his career as a black-belt martial arts instructor in 1983, and simultaneously worked as a personal trainer and door-to-door masseur. His next recruitment was in 1984 at Ramada Plaza Palm Grove, a property of Ramada International chain of hotels, as a health club manager, followed by his employment at The Holiday Inn, Muscat-Al Madinah, Oman with a similar job profile. Thereafter, he returned to Mumbai to become a health club manager for The Oberoi Trident at Nariman Point, where he worked for five years. He started his solo career in 1993 and launched the 'Learn Swimming in 24 hours' programme which received press coverage and found its way to The Limca Book of World Records – 1995. He was featured in the Smart People Magazine where he spoke about holistic health and wellness representing the 'World Health Day'. In 1993, he was assigned to serve as a coach for Femina Miss India and also started off as a wellness coach for media barons, Bollywood industry and the industrialists. In 2003, he inaugurated Mickey Mehta’s 360 degree Gyms which are promoted as wellness temples. The first branch was established at Hughes Road, Mumbai, in April 2003. The brand later expanded to 12 wellness temples that include facilities such as swimming and equipment-free training such as yoga, breathing exercises, meditation, chanting, boot camp, calisthenics, aerobics, agility drills and lifestyle counselling. Mehta's centers are known for providing a discount that is equal to his age during August and September every year. The seasonal offer is always promoted as 'Mickey Mehta's Birthday Offer'. He started his online website in 2009. He has contributed his work on Radio Mirchi, Radio City, Radio One (India) and Red FM 93.5. and has also offered advice in discussions forums on websites such as MSN and idiva.com. Mehta is an author of the book Garbaghyan, which he compiled in association with the National Association for the Blind. He partners with the DNA iCan Marathon event every year as a wellness partner through which he motivates and mentors all participants. Mickey Mehta was a brand ambassador for the German fitness equipment Company Milon for one year. The equipment was used by Salman Khan and Kareena Kapoor during the making of the Bollywood movie Bodyguard. He is currently producing a documentary film on Gandhiji's life and his inclination towards healing with naturopathy. The short documentary will be titled Gandhi- The Healer. The film explores Gandhi's life as a healer. For the film, Mehta interviewed many experts, historians, and spiritual gurus, for their inputs. The film was slated to release on 2 October, Gandhiji's birth anniversary.

== Initiatives ==
He launched "Heal the World Initiative" on 24 August 2011. On 12 February 2013, Mehta launched a braille book with wellness tips for pregnant and lactating women. The book was launched in collaboration with the Director of National Association for the Blind and was titled Swasthya Aur Aarogya. On 15 February 2014, Mehta along with dress designer Maheka Mirpuri launched the MCan, a charitable foundation at the Tata Memorial Hospital (TMH) for providing financial assistance to the underprivileged towards cure for cancer. Mickey Mehta initiated the launch of a department called Wellness Temple at the Masina Hospital in Byculla (Mumbai). The launch took place on 5 June 2014. On 3 April 2016, Mehta along with actress Anita Raj extended their support for World Autism Awareness Campaign month and to respect that, Khushi, a pediatric therapy center located in Mumbai, held Cause-a-thon, a special 7-kilometer and 1-kilometre marathon at Taj Lands End. PepsiCo launched 7 Up Revive along with Mickey Mehta at Hyderabad, India. Mehta along with Gymtrekker announced the second-biggest fitness party at Radio Bar Khar on 3 April 2016.
