= Gangoobai =

- Directed by: Priya Krishnaswamy
- Produced by: National Film Development Corporation of India
- Starring: Sarita Joshi; Purab Kohli; Mita Vashisht; Rajendranath Zutshi; Nidhi Sunil
- Cinematography: Anil Chandel; Sandeep Patil
- Edited by: Priya Krishnaswamy
- Music by: Ved Nair
- Release dates: October 2012 (Mumbai Film Festival); 11 January 2013
- Country: India
- Languages: Hindi; Marathi

Gangoobai is a 2013 Bollywood drama film, produced by the National Film Development Corporation of India and directed by Priya Krishnaswamy. It stars Sarita Joshi in the lead role as Gangoobai.

The story is about an elderly maid servant who works hard to achieve her dream of an extremely expensive Gara sari and changes the lives of people she interacts with while in Mumbai to buy the sari. The film premiered at MAMI 2012 in the New Faces in Indian Cinema section; the South Asian Film Festival in Canada; the Hanoi International Film Festival in Vietnam; and the IFFI 2012.

== Cast ==
- Sarita Joshi as Gangoobai
- Purab Kohli as Waman Ponkshe
- Mita Vashisht as Daksha
- Rajendranath Zutshi as Rohan
- Nidhi Sunil as Monisha
- Ankita Shrivastav as Santripti
- Aparna Kanekar as Malanbai (Gangoobai's friend in village)
- Gopi Desai as Mrs. Tahiliani
- Behram Rana as Jamshyd Mistry
- Rushad Rana as Khushru Mistry
- Ardra Swaroop as Simone's assistant

== Critical response ==
The Times of India gave it 2.5 stars out of 5 and the reviewer summarizes it as "Gangoobai doesn't sweep your heart away, but leaves you with some sweet, feel-good moments." MiD DAY gave the movie 3.5 out of 5 stars and says: "[T]his heartwarming film subtly teaches us something about our generation." The reviewer at Live Mint called it "a fairy tale".
