= Priya Krishnaswamy =

Indian film director

Priya Krishnaswamy is an alumna of the Film and Television Institute of India (FTII), Pune, where she specialised in film editing.

She is a 2-time National Award-winning Indian film producer, writer, director and editor who works predominantly in Hindi and Tamil cinema.

In 2004, her English language documentary film, 'The Eye of the Fish - the Kalaris of Kerala' won the National Award for Best Arts / Cultural film.

She made her feature film directorial debut with the Hindi film Gangoobai (2013), which was a product of NFDC's screenwriters' lab in 2009.

She wrote, edited, directed and produced the Tamil language thriller Baaram (2020) which won the National Award for Best Tamil Feature Film in 2019.

== Filmography ==
Year	Film	Credited as		Language	Notes
Year	Film	Director	Editor	Language	Notes
1988	Om-Dar-B-Dar	No	Yes	Hindi	
1989	Percy	No	Yes	Gujarati	Also actress
1990	Kaafila	No	Yes	Hindi	
1998	Bombay Boys	No	Yes	Hindi	
1999	Bhopal Express	No	Yes	Hindi	
2013	Gangoobai	Yes	Yes	Hindi	Also writer
2020	Baaram	Yes	Yes	Tamil	Also producer and writer
