= Colston Julian =

Indian photographer and director

- Born: India
- Occupations: Photographer, artistic director
- Website: colstonjulian.com

Colston Julian is an Indian photographer and director based in Mumbai. He has worked across commercial advertising, editorial, celebrity portraiture and social documentary over more than two decades. He has contributed to Indian editions of Vogue, GQ, Elle, Harper's Bazaar, Marie Claire, Cosmopolitan, and Rolling Stone, among others.

Beyond commercial work, Julian has contributed to Project Nanhi Kali's annual Proud Fathers for Daughters fundraiser and to Project Portraits for Paws, a street animal welfare initiative in partnership with the Wet Nose Foundation.
