= Surily Goel =

Indian fashion designer (born 1976/77)

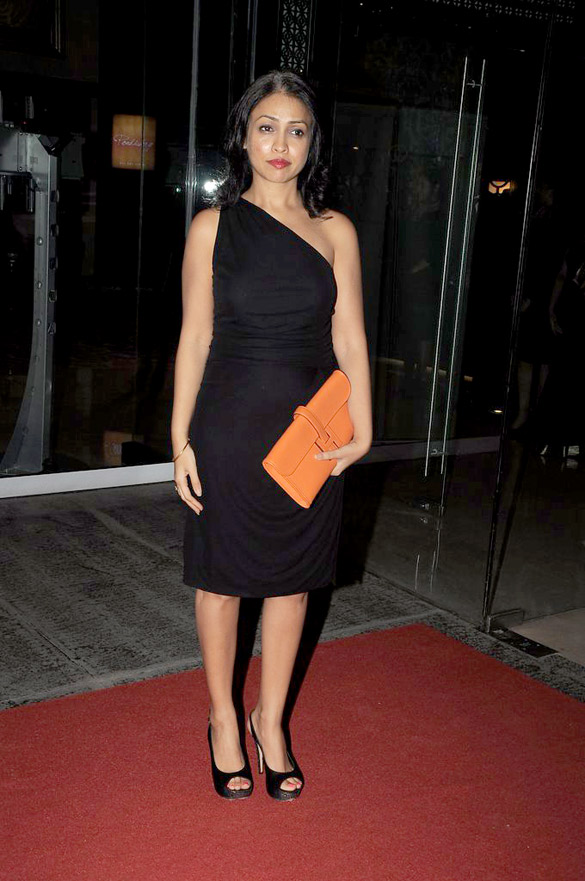
- Surily Goel in 2012
- Born: 1976 or 1977 (age 49–50)
- Education: Fashion Institute of Design and Merchandising, Los Angeles
- Occupation: Fashion designer

Surily Goel (born 1976 or 1977) is an Indian fashion designer, known for her work on several Bollywood films and for her "Surily" clothing line.

== Life and career ==
After graduating from university in Mumbai, Goel studied at the Fashion Institute of Design and Merchandising in Los Angeles. She initially worked as a trainee with designer Manish Malhotra. In 2003 she launched her own range of clothing titled "Surily".

Her early work in the Bollywood film industry included styling for the film Kaal (2005), which she has described as being her break into Bollywood, She has styled actress Preity Zinta in a number of films, including Salaam Namaste (2005), Jaan-E-Mann (2006), Ta Ra Rum Pum (2007), and Ishkq in Paris, which Zinta also produced.

In 2006, Goel had her first showing at Lakme Fashion Week. Her collection was titled Roses Forever. Actors Salman Khan, Malaika Arora and Neelam Kothari modelled her collection. Goel has said that Khan's photo appearing on the front page of The Times of India following the show put her "on the map".

She worked with director Sanjay Leela Bhansali for his film Saawariya (2007). She designed the uniform for the Punjab Kings in the first season of the IPL cricket tournament in 2008, and said it was challenging to design something both stylish and practical for cricket. In the same year, she received a FICCI Young Achievers award. In 2012, Goel released a new line of neon clothing titled "Revival".

After a sabbatical from the fashion industry, Goel returned to designing in 2016 and began creating capsule collections for the Indian fashion store Ensemble. In 2023, in recognition of her label's 20th anniversary, Goel hosted pop-up events in Dubai, Bangkok, Singapore and London, featuring celebrities such as Karan Johar, Salman Khan, Preity Zinta, Malaika Arora, Neetu Kapoor and Suzanne Khan. In December of that year, she collaborated with Ensemble to release a capsule collection featuring bestselling styles from throughout the 20 years.

In 2026 Goel released a new line of bridal couture titled "Modern Heirlooms".

== Filmography ==
Goel has been involved as a costume designer or stylist in the following movies:

- Salaam Namaste (2005)
- Jaan-E-Mann (2006)
- Ta Ra Rum Pum (2007)
- The Last Lear (2007)
- Saawariya (2007)
- Blue (2009)
