= Ashok Rane =

- Citizenship: India
- Occupation: Film critic

Ashok Rane is a two-time National Award-winning film critic, the director of the Indian Film Academy, a professor of film studies for 35 years, film mentor, coorditator-Maharashtra Film and Stage Cultural Development Corporation, and an author.

== Jury member ==
- Toronto International Film Festival
- Rotterdam International Film Festival
- Montreal World Film Festival
- Busan International Film Festival
- Moscow International Film Festival
- IFFI-2011

== Panel member (incomplete) ==
Film Critics Circle of India panel at IFFI on the impact of technology in cinema.

== Books ==
- Sakhkhe Sobati
- Adhyayanache Strot
- Montage
- Cinema Pahnara Manus

== Awards ==
- Special Mention (Book on Cinema Cinemachi Chittarkatha) - 1995
- Special Mention (Film Critic) - 2002
