= Amrita Schools of Engineering =

Private engineering schools in India

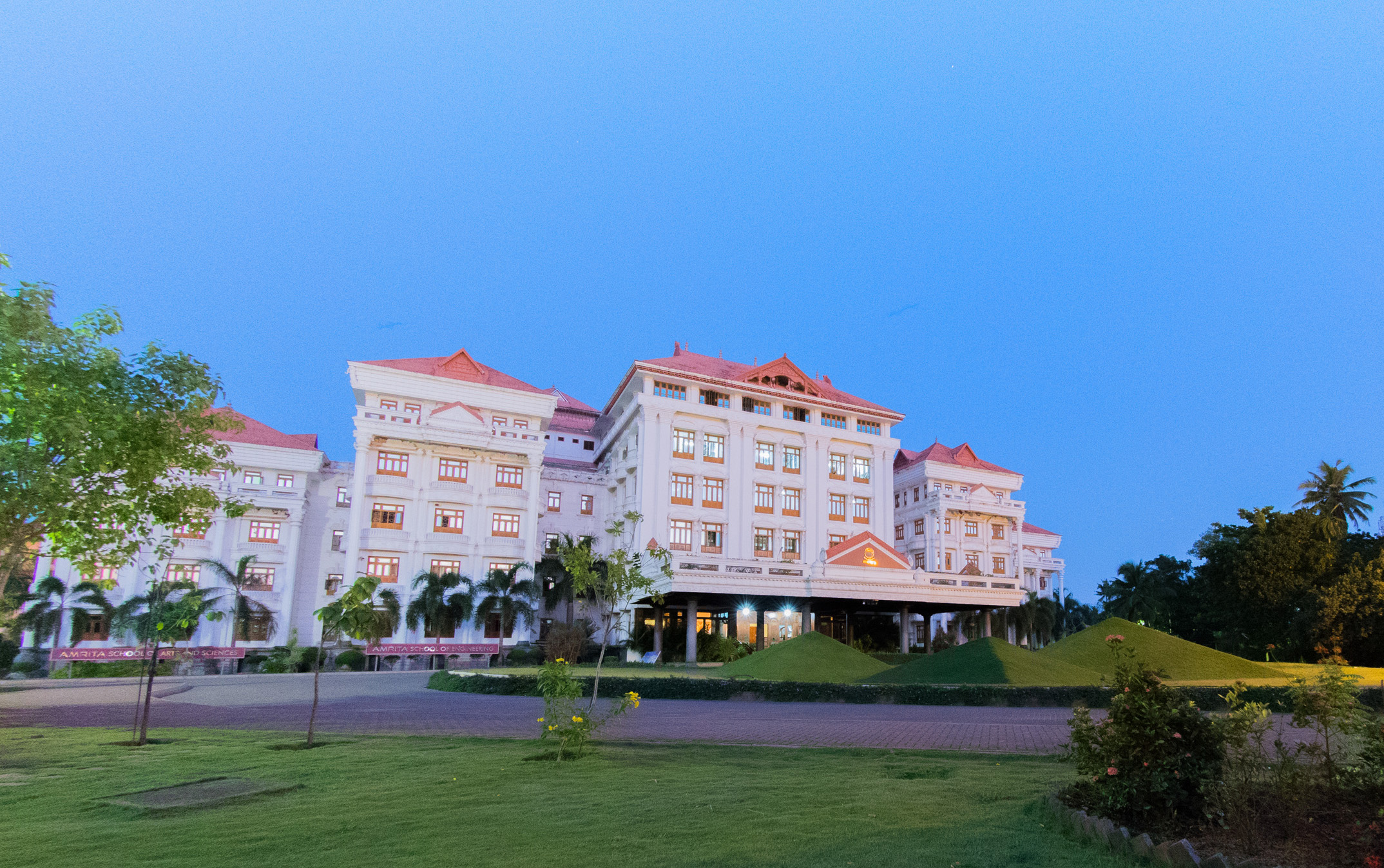
- Type: Private Engineering schools
- Established: 1994
- Founder: Mata Amritanandamayi Devi
- Parent institution: Amrita Vishwa Vidyapeetham
- Affiliations: AICTE, National Assessment and Accreditation Council, National Board of Accreditation
- Dean: Dr. Sasangan Ramanathan
- Location: Coimbatore, India
- Campus: Rural/Urban (multiple sites), 900 acres (360 ha)
- Language: English
- Website: www.amrita.edu/school/engineering

Amrita Schools of Engineering are private engineering schools in India part of Amrita Vishwa Vidyapeetham University, Coimbatore which is spread across its seven campuses in Coimbatore,Amritapuri (Kollam), Bengaluru, Chennai, Amaravati, Nagercoil and Haridwar. The schools offer undergraduate, integrated degree, postgraduate, and doctoral programmes in various engineering & Technology disciplines.

The schools were founded by Mata Amritanandamayi Devi in 1994, and are managed by her international humanitarian organization Mata Amritanandamayi Math.

== History ==
The Amrita School of Engineering, Coimbatore was established in 1994 as an Engineering college in Ettimadai, about 20 km away from the Coimbatore city. It was the first higher educational institution to be set up by the Mata Amritanandamayi Math, which then had only 120 students and 13 faculty members. In 2003, it became Deemed university. Amrita's first campus, Ettimadai campus is home to the administrative headquarters of Amrita University.

Later in 2002, two new campuses were opened with schools of engineering at Bengaluru, and Amritapuri. While the Bengaluru campus sits in Kasavanahalli, a neighbourhood in south-west of the Bengaluru metropolis, the Amritapuri campus was set up in the village of Vallikavu, next to the international headquarters of the Mata Amritanandamayi Math.

In 2003, Amrita Vishwa Vidapeetham became one of the youngest universities to be conferred the status of a deemed university.

In 2019, an engineering school started operating in the newly established Chennai campus, at the outskirts of the Chennai city in the village of Vengal.

In 2021, an engineering school started operating in its new campus at Amaravati, the capital city of Andhra Pradesh.

== Academics ==
=== Academic programmes ===
The schools of Engineering offer undergraduate, postgraduate, Integrated and doctoral courses in various engineering disciplines affiliated to Amrita Vishwa Vidyapeetham. All the programmes are approved and come under the regulations of the AICTE, and the school of engineering is accredited by NAAC and NBA.

== Campuses ==
=== Amrita School of Engineering, Amritapuri ===
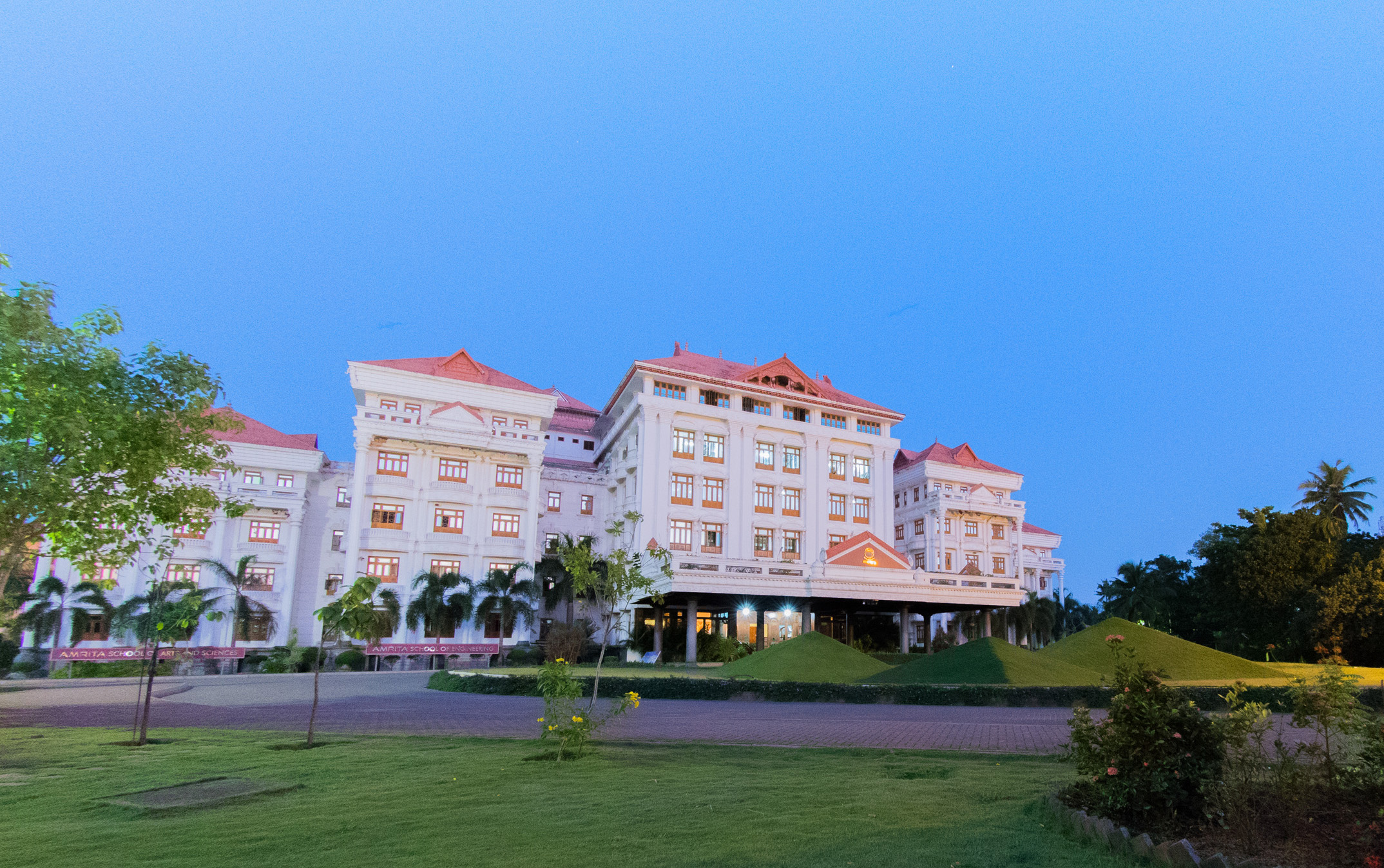
Amrita School Of Engineering, Amritapuri

The school of engineering in the Amritapuri campus started in 2002, and it has Computer Science, Electrical & Electronics, Electronics & Communication, and Mechanical Engineering departments.

=== Amrita School of Engineering, Bengaluru ===
The school of engineering in the Bengaluru campus has Computer Science, Electrical & Electronics, Electronics & Communication, Mechanical Engineering departments alike in the Amritapuri campus, both of which were established together in 2002.

=== Amrita School of Engineering, Chennai ===
The school of engineering in the Chennai campus is second youngest of among the five, and started functioning in 2019. It has Civil, Computer Science, Electrical & Electronics, Electronics & Communication, Cyber Security and Mechanical Engineering departments.

=== Amrita School of Engineering, Coimbatore ===
The school of engineering in Coimbatore campus predates the university, and in 1994 became the first higher-education institution to be set up by the Mata Amritanandamayi Math. Being the headquarters of the University, it has the largest intake of students annually, and offers the most number of programs among the five engineering schools of Amrita. Among the five, It is also the only school to have Aerospace and Chemical Engineering Departments. Other than that, the school has Civil, Computer Science, Electrical & Electronics, Electronics & Communication and Mechanical Departments.

=== Amrita School of Engineering, Amaravati ===
The school of engineering in the Amaravati campus is youngest of among the five, and started functioning in 2022. It has Computer Science, Electrical & Electronics, Electronics & Communication, Mechanical Engineering departments.

== Rankings ==
University rankings

Engineering – India
- NIRF (2023): 19

Amrita School of Engineering is ranked 19th among Engineering institutions in India in 2023 by National Institutional Ranking Framework, an organisation under Indian Government Ministry of Education.

== Admissions and aid ==
=== B.Tech Admission ===
The admissions to all the B.Tech programs offered at Amrita Schools of Engineering is done through Amrita Engineering Entrance Examination (AEEE) and JEE Mains. While 60% of the seats are reserved for AEEE candidates, the rest are allotted for students applying with their JEE Main (BE/BTech) common rank. Admission for foreign nationals, NRI and PIO students is through SAT. The eligible candidates are invited for seat allotment where seats is allotted based on their ranks in both exams with choice order of campus and branch.

==== Eligibility ====
The candidate must have completed Class 12 or HSE or equivalent from recognized Board or University in past 2 years with English, Mathematics and Physics as compulsory subjects and Chemistry or any one of the technical subject prescribed by AICTE with minimum 75% aggregate and not less than 65% in each of the subject to be eligible to apply for AEEE. The age of the candidate should be less than 21 years at the time of admission.

==== AEEE ====
Amrita Engineering Entrance Examination (AEEE) is an annual Computer-Based, multiple-choice entrance test conducted in various centres across India and abroad. Similar to the JEE-Main, the test assesses candidates on high school topics from mathematics, physics and chemistry along with small proportion of English proficiency, Aptitude and Reasoning. Similar to JEE - Main, It has been conducted in two phases since 2022.

The syllabus, preparation, weightage and pattern of the examination is same as that of JEE-Main.

=== M.Tech Admission ===
M.Tech Admission is based on Graduate Aptitude Test in Engineering and personal interview. Candidate with B.Tech or equivalent (4 years) or Master of Science with related major, from recognized University with minimum 75% aggregate are eligible to apply.

=== Scholarships ===
The schools offer scholarships as fee waiver for B.Tech students, based on the rank scored in the JEE main and entrance examination. The student admitted through scholarship has to score minimum CGPA as per the university rules in order to earn the fee waiver in the subsequent years, or his scholarship is passed on to the next eligible student. Scholarships for M.Tech students is based on GATE score and grade in UG.

== Placements ==
As per NAAC and NIRF data, Amrita Schools of Engineering reported an average package of INR 9.7 LPA (Lakhs per Annum) and a highest package of INR 56.75 LPA for 2023 BTech graduates. 2023 MTech graduates reported an average package of INR 8.25 LPA, with the highest package at INR 49 LPA.
