= Amrita Vidyalayam =

Network of secondary schools in India

- India

Information
- School type: Private Unaided, Non-profit
- Motto: Excellence in everything
- Established: 1987
- Founder: Mata Amritanandamayi
- School board: Central Board of Secondary Education
- Educational authority: Department of School Education and Literacy, Ministry of Education, Government of India
- Category: Senior Secondary
- President: Br. Matrudas Chaitanya
- Key people: Mata Amritanandamayi
- Grades: KG to class12
- Gender: co-educational
- Education system: CBSE-based, Value-based
- Language: English
- Campuses: 90+ (across India)
- Campus type: Urban, Rural
- Houses: Amritamayi (Everlasting); Anandamayi (Happiness); Chinmayi (Purity); Jyothirmayi (Brightness)
- Color: Dark Midnight Blue
- Slogan: Shraddhavan Labhate Gyanam (earnest aspirant gains supreme wisdom)
- Athletics: Yes
- Sports: Yes
- Affiliation: Mata Amritanandamayi Math
- Website: http://amritavidyalayam.org/

Amrita Vidyalayam is a chain of private CBSE schools run and managed by the Mata Amritanandamayi Math founded by Mata Amritanandamayi. There are more than 90 English medium, co-educational, Senior Secondary schools affiliated to Central Board of Secondary Education throughout India out of which more than 30 are in Kerala. It is one of the leading schools with 100 per cent pass in All India Secondary School Examination and All India Senior School Certificate Examination in consecutive years. They emphasise on value-based education, sports, extra curricular activities and excellence in competitive exams. It provides coaching for NEET-UG, JEE Main, CUET, Olympiads and other competitive exams with the help of its online learning platform Amrita Edge.

== History ==
The school was founded in 1987 by humanitarian leader Mata Amritanandamayi as a primary English medium school at Kodungallur, Kerala. Later It has improved and now it is a unit of more than 90 schools spread across India.

The school also provides scholarships for students from economically poor families.

The school has got excellence result in Central Board of Secondary Education Board Examinations in consecutive years.

== See also ==
- Amrita Vishwa Vidyapeetham
- Amritapuri
- Kendriya Vidyalaya
