= Amrita Centre for Computational Engineering and Networking =

Department at Amrita University, India

Centre for Excellence in Computational Engineering and Networking (CEN)
- Established: June 1, 2003; 23 years ago
- Laboratory type: research and teaching, university
- Research type: Technology
- Field of research: Artificial Intelligence, Data Science, Cyber Security, Computer Science
- Dean: Dr. Soman K P
- Faculty: Faculty of Engineering and Technology
- Students: Undergrad, Postgrad
- Location: Ettimadai, Coimbatore - 641112, India; 10.9063°N 76.8979°E
- Campus: Amrita Schools of Engineering
- Affiliations: Amrita Vishwa Vidyapeetham
- Website: https://amrita.edu/center/computational-engineering-and-networking/

The Centre for Excellence in Computational Engineering and Networking (CEN) at Amrita Vishwa Vidyapeetham, a research university in India, is a research and teaching center works on technologies to solving computational problems that can be applied in real world projects. The centre is involved in research projects funded by organizations like ISRO, NPOL, Indian Ministry of Electronics and Information Technology and Department of Science and Technology. The center is involved in the areas of Artificial intelligence, Cyber security, Computer networks, Computational Linguistics, Data science and Natural Language Processing. A translation project is underway to develop tools to translate web content from English to Indian languages. Research is also ongoing in the area of speech translation.

CEN is a centre under the Amrita Schools of Engineering. The centre is headed by Dr K P Soman who has been in the research field for more than 25 years. He secured his PhD from IIT Kharagpur and was scientific officer in the Reliability Engineering Centre, IIT Kharagpur, before joining Amrita.

== Academics ==
The center offers Bachelor of Technology in Artificial intelligence, Cyber security, Computer science and engineering and Master of Technology in Computational Engineering and Networking, Artificial intelligence and Machine Learning, Data science, Remote Sensing & Wireless Sensor Network, Cyber security, Computer network, Embedded Computing and Control, Robotics and Computer Vision, Computational chemistry, Quantum computing, Scientific Computing and Applications, Wireless Communication, Signal processing, Computer vision, Digital image processing and Information systems. The centre also offers various certificate and online programs.
