= Hindu Selves in a Modern World =

2005 book by Maya Warrier

Hindu Selves in a Modern World: Guru Faith in the Mata Amritanandamayi Mission is a book by Maya Warrier which has contributed to the discussion of Hinduism in the context of modernity. Its significance as an addition to the literature on the Mata Amritanandamayi Mission is that it provides an analytical perspective, supplementing the existing literature written by devotees of the group.

== Contents ==
Maya Warrier in her book Hindu Selves in a Modern World: Guru Faith in the Mata Amritanandamayi Mission looks towards the phenomena of avatar gurus as a recent and dramatic development among Hinduism by particularly focusing on Mata Amritanandmayi Mission (MAM) and through its attempts at understanding larger course of events in contemporary world.

The book depicts the developments in religion especially Hinduism in the contemporary modern world of consumerism and revolutionized communications by studying MAM which is a Female led Guru-Faith based organization, i.e. by Mata Amritanandmayi, popularly known as Amma with her origins in Kerala, belonging to a lower caste with nominal education but now attracting urban middle class Indian devotees and a huge transnational following.

In the present context Hinduism is usually seen in relation to the development of militant Hinduism since the 1980s. In this study, Warrier explores a parallel development to the above change more suitable to modern educated Hindu men and women.

Modernity is the central theme of the book and Warrier argues that this recent development of avatar gurus is a form of alternative modernity, a widely critiqued concept and tries to explore how modernity and modern selfhood is negotiated through this guru fold. She does this in three ways, firstly, by her detailed examination of Mata's narrative, particularly her perceptions of the problems of the modern world and the varied remedies she offers. The book provides a portrayal and analysis of the devotees' engagement with Mata by presenting the reader with a selection of the devotees' own accounts of their encounters with her. Warrier then supplies her own narrative constructed through her meetings with Mata, her family, her devotees (Indian and non-Indian) and other key personalities from within and outside the organization. She focusses on the devotees viewpoint towards modernity and based on it argues against the tendency to see Hinduism as incompatible to modernity. She argues the development and growth of MAM as a modern phenomenon on the following bases which she explains in the seven chapters of the book:

1. The use of modern technology and means of communication
2. Catering to the needs or problems emerging in modern world
3. Followers make rational choice in selection of gurus that being intrinsic to modernity.
4. Provides frames of reference rooted in modernity to understand sorrow and sufferings.
5. The kinds of spirituality followed in this organization gives individual choice and agency in selection of deity and the way of achieving spirituality or worship

Based on the above arguments she argues that these guru-faith based organizations are one of the multiple ways in which Hindus interact and negotiate with modernizing, globalizing and other far reaching influences in their lives.

Overall it gives an idea of the inner world of these guru-faith based organizations. She also gives a lens to see these organization from the followers' point of view. It helps to understand the needs of the urban middle class Indians and one of the responses of Hinduism to those needs and complexities emerging in the contemporary political context.

== Reception ==
A 2008 review in the journal Religions of South Asia described the book as "fascinating and well constructed," and as providing a more analytical perspective on Mata Amritanandamayi than the books written by devotees. The book was also reviewed in the Journal of Contemporary Religion in 2008.
