= Amrita Hospital =

Amrita Hospital may refer to one of the following:

- Amrita Hospital, Kochi
- Amrita Hospital, Faridabad

== See also ==
- Amrita School of Medicine
