= Amrita movement =

Movement in Hinduism

Amrita is a Hindu movement named after Mata Amritanandamayi.

== Founder ==
Mata Amritanandamayi is often described as the hugging saint. She has hugged countless people. A hug from her is said to have brought peace to the devotees. Ammachi, as she is popularly called, advocates the Advaitic principle of seeing everybody as oneself.

== Year & place of founding ==
Amritapuri, Kollam, Kerala, India.

=== Monastic / Non-monastic ===
Monastic

=== General philosophical outlook ===
Advaita philosophy is followed. The movement is non-sectarian.

=== Spiritual disciplines generally advocated ===
Integrated Amrita Meditation Technique. Service of fellow human-beings.

=== Present chief of the movement ===
Mata Amritanandamayi

== Activities ==
=== Religion & spirituality ===
Brahmasthanams are the temples built by Amritanandamayi. Here pooja is offered to reduce the negative effect of planets on devotees.

=== Social field ===
- Mother's kitchen for feeding the poor, Building the houses for poor, Orphanages, monthly pension scheme for old age people, Old care homes, legal assistance to poor and needy are some of the services described on the organization's website.
- Amrita Institute of Medical sciences is a medical college with facility for 800 beds. Medical treatment is rendered to the poor at free or at subsidised price.
- Amrita Kripasagar is a hospice for terminally ill people with accommodation facility for up to 50 people.
- Amritakripa hospital at Amritapuri for the poor and needy
- Several Mobile centres for giving medical assistance.

=== Education field ===
- Amrita School of Engineering
- Amrita School of Business
- Amrita Institute of Medical Sciences
- Schools for software training, Industrial training, Pharmaceutical etc.
- Several primary and secondary education institutes throughout India

=== Relief activities ===
- Rendered service during the Gujarat earthquakes
- Tsunami disaster relief operation
- Relief Services provided after Bihar floods in Bihar, India.
- Haiti Relief in 2010 Haiti Earthquake

=== Province of its influence ===
Chiefly Keraliten and Malayali communities all over the globe is where it has influence. It also has devotees throughout India.

== Major publications ==
- Amma – Healing the Heart of the World
- Awaken Children – Vol 1 to 9
- Racing along the Razor's edge
- Lead us to light – compiled by Swami Jnanamritananda Puri
- From Amma's heart
- Amrita e-newsletter

== See also ==
- Survey of Hindu organisations
