= Gail Tredwell =

Australian author (born 1958)

- Born: Queensland, Australia
- Other name: Gayatri
- Occupation: Author
- Writing career
- Notable works: Holy Hell: A Memoir of Faith, Devotion, and Pure Madness
- Website: gailtredwell.com

Gail Tredwell (born 1958) is an Australian author. She was born in Queensland, Australia. Tredwell served Mata Amritanandamayi, known more frequently as simply Amma, for 19 years (1980-1999) as a disciple. Her autobiography, Holy Hell: A Memoir of Faith, Devotion, and Pure Madness, was published in November 2013 by Wattle Tree Press, Maui, Hawai'i.

== Controversy ==
Gail Tredwell's autobiography led to a controversy in 2014 in Mata Amritanandmayi's Ashram. The book alleges that a senior follower of the ashram, Balu, had sexually abused the author for several years. It also alleged that Amritanandamayi behaved rudely and aggressively, abusing the author for several years. After publishing the book Holy Hell, the first interview with Tredwell was published by Daily Indian Herald, an online news source.

The mainstream media of Kerala was reluctant to report these allegations. A few news sources however broke the story. Later, other news channels telecast exclusive interviews with Tredwell in two episodes, disregarding legal notices from the Amritanandamayi Ashram. Kairali TV managing editor John Brittas went to New York for this interview with Tredwell. The Ashram initiated legal proceedings against two news channels and also against news anchor John Brittas. The Press Club of India asked Amritanandamayi Ashram in Kerala to withdraw the case.

In accordance with an order from Ernakulam Judicial First Class Magistrate Court, on 11 March 2014, Kerala Police registered a case against Tredwell along with media organizations who reported the news, in response to a petition. The case was booked under Sections 153A (Promoting enmity between different groups on ground of religion, race, place of birth, residence, language, etc., and doing acts prejudicial to maintenance of harmony), 153B (imputations, assertions prejudicial to national integration), 295A (deliberate and malicious acts intended to outrage religious feelings of any class by insulting its religion or religious beliefs), 298 (uttering words, etc., with deliberate intent to wound religious feelings), 120B (criminal conspiracy) and 34 (acts done by several persons in furtherance of common intention) of the Indian Penal Code.

== Malayalam translation of Holy Hell ==
Holy Hell was translated into Malayalam It became an immediate sensation, but the publication of the book was stayed by the Supreme Court of India following the complaints made by the Math.
