= Amrita Learning =

Online education platform

- Industry: Internet, e-learning
- Founded: Kochi, India, October 2005
- Headquarters: Kochi, INDIA
- Key people: Prema Nedungadi, VP, Product Development; Raghu Raman, Founder and CEO Amrita Technologies
- Website: www.amritalearning.com

Amrita Learning is a computer-based 'adaptive learning' program in English and Mathematics. It provides interactive, audiovisual supplementary education for children of three-and-a-half years to 7th grade, for home and classroom use. Developed in collaboration with Amrita University, the content of this research-based software is in line with the NCERT/CBSE syllabi.

== Adaptive Assessment ==
Under the 'Adaptive Assessment' concept, as a student learns, s/he is continually assessed by the programme and the software adapts to their level. "The programme is also being used at some schools to administer the CBSE mandated Continuous and Comprehensive Evaluation (CCE). Teachers can replace a large portion of paper-based CCE with computer based assessment. After the teacher teaches a set of topics in the classroom, students are immediately taken to the computer and evaluated. Students who have mastered one topic move on to the next level, and those who have not mastered a topic are provided with more practice."

== History ==
Based on research conducted by Amrita University, Amrita Learning was founded in Kochi, Kerala, India by Raghu Raman and is directed by Prema Nedungadi in 2005. In August 2007, Amrita Learning partnered with broadband providers BSNL to provide educational content as part of their subscriber package. In February 2008, Former President of India Dr A. P. J. Abdul Kalam inaugurated the Amrita Vidyalayam e-learning Network which connects 55 schools throughout India, and will feature content from Amrita Learning.
