= Envestnet =

American financial services company

Envestnet, Inc.
- Trade name: Envestnet
- Type: Private
- Industry: Financial services
- Founded: 1999; 27 years ago
- Founder: Jud Bergman (1957–2019) and Bill Crager
- Headquarters: Berwyn, Pennsylvania, United States
- Area served: Worldwide
- Key people: Chris Todd (CEO)
- Revenue: ▲US$1.245 billion (2023)
- AUM: ▲US$5.8 trillion (2023)
- Total assets: ▲US$1.877 billion (2023)
- Number of employees: 3,100 (2023)
- Website: envestnet.com

Envestnet, Inc. is an American financial technology corporation which develops and distributes wealth management software and products to financial advisors and institutions. Its main product is an advisory platform that integrates the services and software used by financial advisors in wealth management.

Envestnet has more than $6.5 trillion in platform assets and counts more than 111,000 advisors, 17 of the 20 largest U.S. banks, 48 of the 50 largest wealth management and brokerage firms, more than 500 of the largest RIAs as clients.

== History ==
=== 1999–2020 ===
Envestnet was founded by Jud Bergman in 1999, with Bill Crager as co-founder. The company's initial public offering of stock filed on the NYSE and went public on 28 July 2010. It priced at $9; at the bottom of the range of $9–$10. The major underwriters were Morgan Stanley, UBS AG, and Barclays. The company raised $63M by selling 7 million shares.

In August 2015, three years after acquiring Tamarac for $54 million, Envestnet acquired Yodlee, a cloud-based data analytics company that provides account aggregation and various financial software, for $660 million.

In the same year, Envestnet also acquired online investment platform Upside in February and financial-planning software provider Finance Logix in May. The firm stated that their main goal was to drive the acquisitions to provide a full suite of technology offerings for financial advisers.

In November 2017, the company introduced a redesigned Tamarac platform. The following year, BlackRock invested $123 million to acquire a 4.9% equity stake in the company.

After Bergman was killed in a car crash in October 2019, Crager took over as interim chief executive officer.

In December 2019, Envestnet entered an agreement with JPMorgan Chase to protect Chase's customers' financial data through an API.

The company received controversy in 2020 when it was sued in a class action for its collection of consumer financial data. It filed a motion to dismiss in November of 2020, which was partially granted but partially denied by the court.

=== 2020–present ===
In March 2020, Crager was named permanent CEO after serving as the interim CEO since October 2019. In April 2024, Board chairman Jim Fox became interim CEO following Crager's departure.

Envestnet and Yodlee were sued in August of 2020 for collecting users' data without customer knowledge. The plaintiff, Deborah Wesch of New Jersey, accuses Yodlee and Envestnet of failing to "adequately protecting consumer data and have failed to put in place sufficient security protocols in the United States". Envestnet filed a motion to dismiss the lawsuit and successfully rid four of the ten claims, the remainder of which were not dismissed. Judge Sallie Kim of the United States District Court for the Northern District of California also ruled that the plaintiffs' alter ego claim lacked sufficient evidence to be justified; nevertheless, Judge Kim allowed the six remaining claims to be heard.

In July 2024, Envestnet agreed to be acquired by a consortium of investors for $4.5 billion. The buyer group included private equity firm Bain Capital, along with asset management giants BlackRock, Fidelity Investments, Franklin Templeton, and State Street Global Advisors.

On November 25, 2024, Envestnet announced that the Bain-controlled consortium had completed the purchase of the firm, in a deal valued at approximately $4.5 billion.

In 2025, the firm appointed Chris Todd to take the place of interim CEO Fox.

In June 2025, Envestnet announced the sale of Yodlee to the private equity firm, STG.
