= P. Venkat Rangan =

Indian computer scientist

- Born: August 25, 1961 (age 65); Mysuru, Karnataka, India
- Education: Indian Institute of Technology Madras (1980-1984); Cornell University (1984-1985); University of California, Berkeley (1985-1988)
- Occupation: Vice Chancellor
- Known for: Computer Science, Multimedia
- Scientific career
- Fields: Computer Science
- Workplaces: Amrita University; University of California, San Diego
- Thesis: Trust Relationships, Naming, and Secure Communication in Large Distributed Computer Systems (1998)
- Doctoral advisor: Domenico Ferrari

P. Venkat Rangan (born 1961) is an Indian computer scientist and vice chancellor of Amrita University.

He is a former professor at the University of California, San Diego, where he founded the Multimedia Laboratory & Research Center. He is the founder and former CEO of the Yodlee, Inc an online account aggregation Tech company for which he was named one of the top entrepreneurs in the U.S. in 2000.

He is an ACM Fellow and is recognized as a pioneer in the field of multimedia systems. He has over 100 research papers and 30 US patents and the driving force behind the setting up of a large number of inter-disciplinary research centers in Amrita University. He has extensively collaborated with international and Indian Govt partners on research projects.

== Education ==
Venkat Rangan has been the recipient of President of India's gold medal from Indian Institute of Technology Madras in 1984 during his UG. As a Ph.D. student in computer science, he spent a year at Cornell University, before moving to University of California, Berkeley. At UC Berkeley he secured the top-most rank in the qualifying exams for graduate studies. In 1988, his Ph.D. thesis at University of California, Berkeley was judged the outstanding Ph.D. of the year by IBM.

== Research and academic career ==
He was the founder and director of the Multimedia Laboratory and Internet & Wireless Networks (WiFi) Research center at the University of California, San Diego, where was also professor of computer science and engineering for 16 years. At age 33 he was one of the youngest full professors at University of California, San Diego.

Venkat Rangan has been identified by the ACM as a pioneer of research in multimedia systems, and for "founding one of the foremost centers for research in multimedia, in which area he is an inventor of fundamental techniques with global impact".

=== Entrepreneurship ===
He is the founder and CEO of Yodlee, Inc., an American personal finance software company pioneering in online account aggregation service. For his work, he was selected as one of the 25 best entrepreneurs by the US president in 2000 and featured on the July 2000 cover of Internet World Magazine.

== Positions held ==
Venkat Rangan has had various positions:

- Founder and Program Chairman of ACM Multimedia ’93: First International Conference on Multimedia, a premier world-wide conference on multimedia
- Founder and Editor-in-Chief of the ACM/Springer-Verlag journal: Multimedia Systems, a premier journal on Multimedia.
- member of multimedia expert panel of the US National Academy of Sciences/ROC Scientific Committee, a visiting scientist at Xerox Parc
- Multimedia Technology Advisor to the Electronics Secretary of the Government of India
- Program Chairman, 1997 Indo-US Bilateral Conference on Multimedia.

== Awards ==
- NSF National Young Investigator Award (1993)
- Fellow of Association for Computing Machinery (1998): youngest to achieve this international distinction
- named under top 25 Stars of Internet Technologies, featured on its cover page of Internet World (July 2000)
- Best Computer Science Scientists in India award (2023)
- Stanford top scientists 2% award (2023)
