= Amritapuri =

Hindu Ashram in Kerala, India

Coordinates: 9.089736°N 76.485908°E

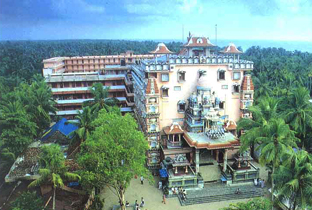
The Main Ashram of Sri Mata Amritanandamayi Devi

Amritapuri (Malayalam: അമൃതപുരി, Sanskrit: अमृतपुरी), originally Parayakadavu, is the main ashram of Indian Hindu spiritual leader, guru and humanitarian Mata Amritanandamayi Devi, often known as Amma ("Mother"), who is revered as 'the hugging saint' by her followers. Amritapuri is also the international headquarters of Mata Amritanandamayi Math, an international charitable organization aimed at the spiritual and material upliftment of humankind. Due to the worldwide renown of the ashram, Amritapuri is also the name by which the location of the ashram is now known.

Amritapuri is located in the Kollam district of the state of Kerala in India, with the closest major city being Kollam (29 km). The city is also 8 km away from Karunagappalli, about 110 km north of Thiruvananthapuram, and 120 km south of Kochi.

Amritapuri is spread over 100 acres of land and is the headquarters, and one of the seven campuses of the Amrita Vishwa Vidyapeetham, alias Amrita University.

Embracing the World is a global charity foundation operating under Mata Amritanandamayi Math.

== Etymology ==
The name "Amritapuri" is derived from Amma's name (Mata Amritanandamayi) and consists of two Sanskrit words: "Amrita" and "Puri," which carry deep spiritual significance.

1. "Amrita" (अमृत): The word "Amrita" in Sanskrit means "immortal" or "nectar of immortality", similar to the Greek ambrosia. It symbolizes eternal life or spiritual immortality in Hinduism and signifies divine sustenance.
2. "Puri" (पुरी): The term "Puri" means "city" or "dwelling place" in Sanskrit. It is often used to refer to sacred cities or places of pilgrimage in India, and the suffix "puri" is commonly added to the names of towns or temples to denote a place imbued with spiritual significance.

When combined, "Amritapuri" translates to "the city of immortality." This name reflects the spiritual nature of the ashram as a space dedicated to the pursuit of eternal truths, self-realization, and Amma's teachings.

== History of the Ashram ==
=== Early beginnings (1953–1980s) ===
Amritapuri traces its origins to Amma's early life. She was born in 1953 in a small fishing village called Parayakadavu, which is where the ashram now stands. From a very young age, Amma exhibited deep spiritual tendencies, spending long hours meditating and chanting the names of God. During her childhood, Amma faced many hardships, including poverty and familial opposition to her spiritual practices. Despite this, she continued to grow in spiritual stature, attracting a small group of devotees. Her early life was marked by acts of compassion, she started giving "darshan" (spiritual blessings) in the form of a hug, an act that later became her hallmark.

Initially, the ashram was simply Amma's family home. Throughout the early years of the ashram, darshan took place in the family cowshed. The cowshed was eventually converted into a small temple, the Kalari, which still exists today (and is now used to conduct pujas). Gradually, as Amma attracted more disciples, small huts and rooms were built for them.

=== The formation of the Ashram (1980s) ===
Eventually, the number of visitors coming for Amma's darshan surpassed the Kalari's capacity. This location eventually expanded to accommodate the increasing number of followers who wished to live a monastic life, follow Amma's teachings, and participate in her humanitarian activities. To accommodate, the Amritapuri Kali Temple was built at this time, which came to become an icon of the ashram. Taking 5 years to finish (1988-1992), it was the first large cement structure in the ashram, built with only a modest budget. The Kali murti (modeled on the Kali murti at Dakshineshwar Kali Temple) was crafted in Kolkata as per Amma's directions. The Kali Temple served as Amma's Darshan hall for the next few years.

By the mid-1980s, the ashram had grown significantly, with facilities being constructed for residents, visitors, and Amma's humanitarian programs. During this period, Amma began traveling more extensively within India, drawing attention from spiritual seekers and ordinary people alike.

=== Expansion, humanitarian work, and global recognition (1990s-present) ===
After 2000, the Kali Temple became too small for the large crowds coming to the Ashram, and an immense darshan hall was built behind the temple. This darshan hall spans 30,000 square feet making it the largest such hall in Southern India, with a seamless view with no obstructions. This main hall is where daily programs, bhajans, and darshan are still held regularly. The ashram also expanded its facilities to include more highrise residential accommodations for visitors, a hospital, and educational institutions. In the 2000s, Amritapuri continued to serve as the center for Amma's vast humanitarian network, which grew to include projects in environmental sustainability, women's empowerment, and healthcare. Amma also started traveling abroad during this period, holding programs in countries around the world. Amritapuri remained her spiritual home and the base for her global mission.

==== Embracing the World ====
In 2005, the term "Embracing the World" was coined to represent the growing network of humanitarian efforts that Amma and her organization were leading around the globe. This name encapsulates Amma’s vision of embracing all people, regardless of caste, creed, race, or nationality, with love and compassion. What started as a local initiative eventually expanded into a global movement, with projects spanning over 40 countries. The ashram became the headquarters for many charitable projects, including free medical care, housing for the poor, disaster relief, and educational initiatives. Amma’s message of selfless service and unconditional love resonated across the world, and people from various cultures and backgrounds began visiting Amritapuri. During this time, Amritapuri became a spiritual and cultural hub, hosting international visitors and volunteers.

==== Amrita University ====
One of the significant milestones was the founding of Amrita Vishwa Vidyapeetham (Amrita University) in 2002, a top-ranked research university with a focus on integrating modern scientific knowledge and technological advancements with spiritual wisdom. The Amritapuri campus was among the university’s first locations, established to provide higher education near the ashram. The Amritapuri campus is closely linked to Amma’s humanitarian mission, and its founding marked a pivotal moment in the university’s development. It began with engineering programs and expanded rapidly to include departments in sciences, humanities, and social sciences. The foundation of Amrita University is rooted in Amma’s belief in education as a tool for personal transformation and social upliftment. Since its inception, the Amritapuri campus has seen substantial growth, evolving from a small institute to a world-class university. In an interview with the Times of India Amma stated "that the seeds of research and development at Amrita University had sprouted from the inherent yearning to minimize human suffering and help the deserving."

==== The 2004 Indian Ocean tsunami ====
The 2004 Indian Ocean tsunami had a significant impact on Amritapuri, as it is located on the southern coast of Kerala, near the epicenter of the disaster. On 26 December 2004, a massive undersea earthquake triggered a series of devastating tsunamis across the Indian Ocean, causing widespread destruction and loss of life in many coastal regions, including Amritapuri. When the water first hit the Ashram, Amma was giving darshan. The sea level rose again up to three meters above the surface, and ground-floor rooms of the ashram were under water for 20 minutes. Nearby villages were heavily affected, and many homes were destroyed. The area around the ashram experienced significant flooding, which displaced a large portion of the local population, especially the fishing communities that lived in nearby coastal villages.

In the aftermath of the tsunami, Amma personally led the ashram’s response to the disaster. She mobilized ashram residents, volunteers, and devotees to provide immediate relief and long-term rehabilitation to the affected areas. Within hours, the ashram organized relief teams to assist those in need. Villagers in nearby affected neighborhood were accommodated at the ashram and at Amrita University's campus. Arrangements were made for boats to take people further inland, across the backwaters. Food, clothing, medical care, and shelter were provided to the displaced populations.

Amritapuri became a center for disaster relief operations, with the ashram's humanitarian organization, Embracing the World, coordinating large-scale relief efforts. In addition to immediate relief, the ashram undertook long-term rehabilitation initiatives, including the construction of homes, schools, and healthcare facilities for the displaced. Thousands of homes were rebuilt by the ashram in Kerala, Tamil Nadu, and other affected regions in India and Sri Lanka.

In response to the tsunami, the Amrita Setu Pedestrian Bridge was constructed between 2005-2006 for easy accessibility across the river. The bridge was inaugurated by A.P.J. Abdul Kalam, former president of India in December of 2006.

==== Other initiatives ====
The ashram is closely associated with Amrita Hospitals (with locations in Kochi and Faridabad) which are part of the ashram's charitable healthcare initiative.

Technological innovation became another aspect of Amritapuri’s contributions to society, Amma herself being quoted as saying, "The Indians who gain expertise in such scientific pursuits should contribute and work towards nation building." The ashram has led research efforts through Amrita University in fields such as sustainable development, disaster management, and artificial intelligence for social good.

== Transport ==
Nearest International Airports -
1. Cochin International Airport COK (140 km)
2. Thiruvananthapuram International Airport TRV (105 km)

Nearest KSRTC bus stations -
1. Oachira (5 km)
2. Karunagappalli (9 km)

Nearest railway stations -
1. Oachira (ocr) (9 km)
2. Karunagappally (kpy) (9 km),
3. Kayamkulam (kyj) (15 km)

Nearest municipalities -
1.Karunagappalli (9 km)
2.Kayamkulam (14 km)
