= Amrita Vishwa Vidyapeetham =

Private university in Coimbatore, Tamil Nadu, India

- Other name: Amrita University
- Motto: śhraddhāvān labhate jñānaṁ (Sanskrit)
- Motto in English: The earnest aspirant gains supreme wisdom
- Type: Private, Deemed University
- Established: 1994; 32 years ago
- Founder: Mata Amritanandamayi
- Accreditation: NAAC (A++)
- Affiliations: UGC, AICTE
- Chancellor: Mata Amritanandamayi
- Vice-Chancellor: P. Venkat Rangan
- President: Swami Amritaswarupananda Puri
- Academic staff: 2000+
- Students: 30,000+
- Location: Coimbatore, Tamil Nadu, India; 10.9038°N 76.9003°E
- Campus: multiple sites, 10 campuses across India, 1,300 acres (530 ha)
- Colours: AM Maroon (Pantone 7426C)
- Website: www.amrita.edu

Amrita Vishwa Vidyapeetham (or Amrita University) is a multi-campus, multi-disciplinary private deemed university in India. It currently has 19 constituent schools spread across ten campuses in Coimbatore, Amritapuri (Kollam), Kochi, Bengaluru, Amaravati, Chennai, Faridabad, Mysore, Nagercoil and Haridwar. Accredited with the highest possible ‘A++’ grade by NAAC and ranked as 7th best university in India in National Institutional Ranking Framework (NIRF) 2024.

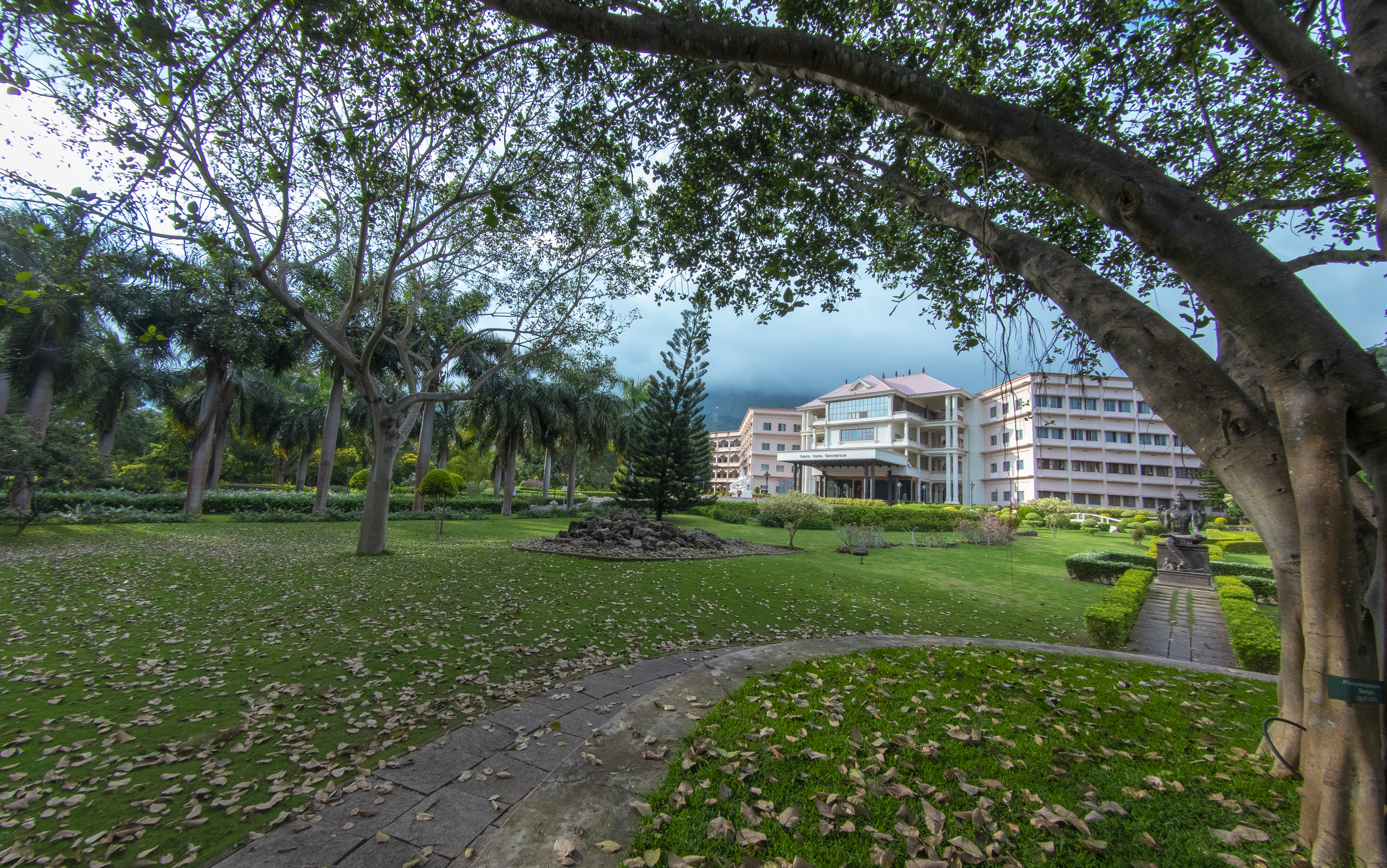
Coimbatore campus

It is headquartered in Ettimadai, Coimbatore. The other ten campuses are satellite off-campuses of the same university as per section 3 of the University Grants Commission Act, 1956. It offers over 300 undergraduate, postgraduate, integrated-degree, dual-degree, doctoral programs in engineering, medicine, management, architecture & planning, natural sciences, Ayurveda & health sciences, agriculture & life sciences, commerce, Arts & humanities, social sciences, media & communication, law, fine arts and cultural studies. As of 2023, the university had a faculty strength of over 2000 and over 30,000 students.

== History ==
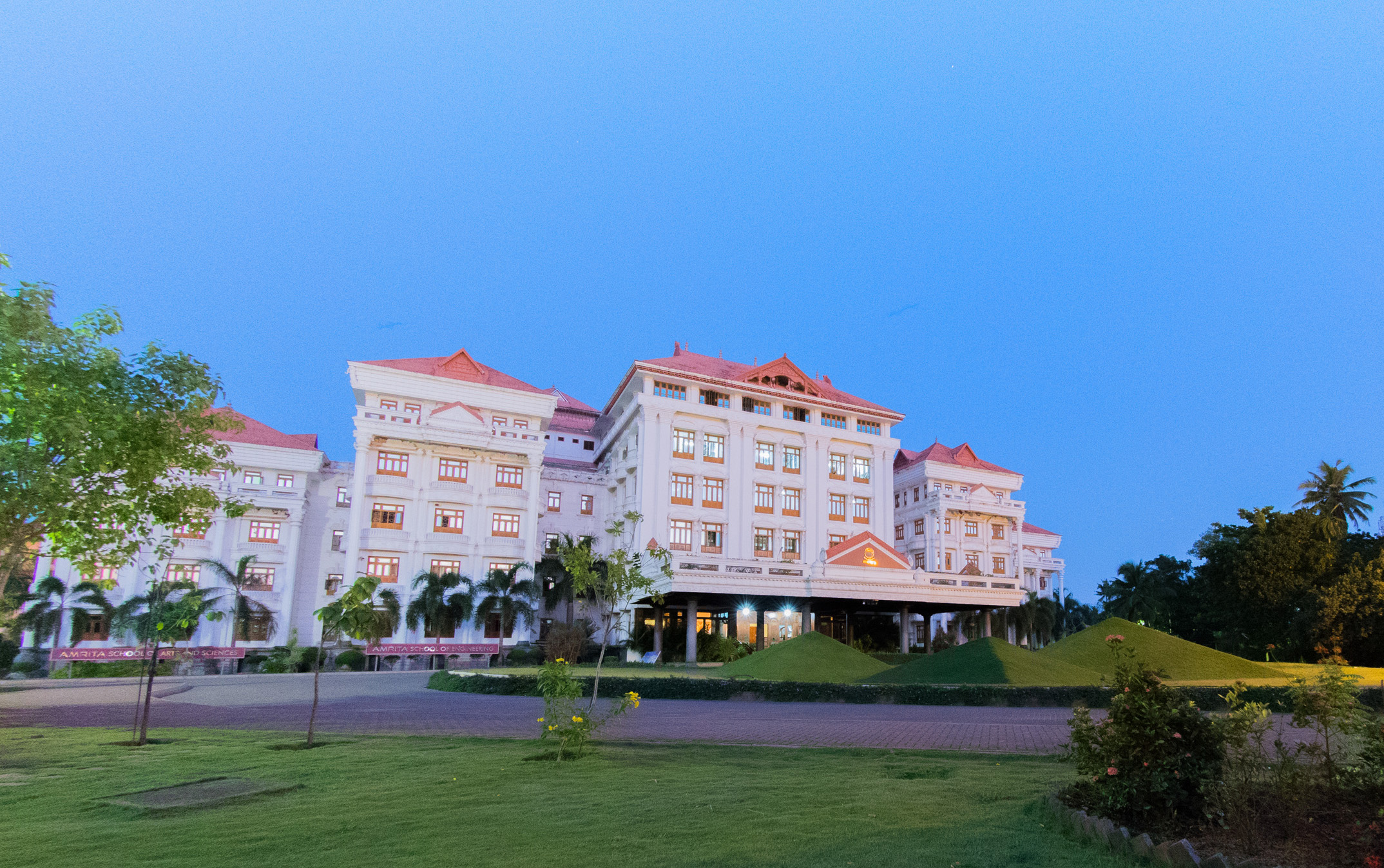
Amritapuri campus

The university was founded with the opening of Amrita School of Engineering, Coimbatore as college under Anna University at Ettimadai village in 1994 by Mata Amritanandamayi and is managed by her international humanitarian organisation Mata Amritanandamayi Math. On 17 May 1998, Amrita School of Medicine, Kochi along with Amrita Hospital, Kochi was established at Ponekkara near Edapally, Kochi and was inaugurated by the then Prime Minister, Atal Bihari Vajpayee. Later in 2002, two campuses with engineering and business schools were opened affiliated to state universities, one urban campus at Bengaluru, and one rural campus in Amritapuri village, which also hosts the headquarters of the Mata Amritanandamayi Math that runs the university. In 2003, it became one of the youngest institutes to be accredited as a deemed university by the UGC with all its campuses and schools as constituents and was named as Amrita Vishwa Vidyapeetham. In 2017, extension campus with school of agricultural sciences was started in Arasampalayam, Coimbatore. In 2019, an engineering school campus was opened in Vengal, Chennai. In 2021, a full-fledged campus at Amaravati city was opened. In 2022, a medical school campus along with Amrita Hospital, Faridabad was inaugurated by the Prime Minister, Narendra Modi at Faridabad, Haryana. In 2024, new campus was started at Erachakulam, Nagercoil by acquiring Sun College of Engineering & Technology campus. In 2025, new multi-disciplinary STEM campus was started at Haridwar.

== Organisation and administration ==
Amrita Vishwa Vidyapeetham is run and managed by Mata Amritanandamayi Math, governed and administered under the leadership of its founder and chancellor, Mata Amritanandamayi, and its vice-chancellor, Dr. P. Venkat Rangan. The board of management includes Swami Amritaswarupananda Puri as President, Swami Abhayamritananda Puri as Pro-Chancellor and Swami Ramakrishnananda Puri as a member.

All campuses are centrally administered with uniformity and all off-campuses are part of same university as per section 3 of University Grants Commission Act, 1956.

Academically, each faculty is led by a dean, and each school within a campus has a principal. Under each school, Academic departments are overseen by chairpersons, with vice chairpersons and heads managing specific functions.

Administratively, key directorates manage functions such as examinations, admissions & scholarship, accreditation & rankings, patents, communications, ICT & library services, student affairs & anti-ragging, corporate relations, placement, National Education Policy initiatives, online programs, various cells & committees, physical education, and campus planning & development. These directorates are each headed by a director.

Functional portfolios including HR and finance are headed by managers.

== Campuses ==
As of 2024, the university has ten campuses, with 19 constituent schools in rural and urban sites in six Indian states – Tamil Nadu, Kerala, Andhra Pradesh, Haryana, Uttarakhand and Karnataka.

Locations of Amrita University campuses

Campuses of Amrita Vishwa Vidyapeetham
Campus	Location	Founded	Campus area (in acres)	Schools
Coimbatore	Ettimadai, near Coimbatore, Tamil Nadu	1994	450 acres	School of Computing & Artificial Intelligence; School of Physical Sciences; School of Business; School of Engineering; School of law
Coimbatore	Arasampalayam, Kinathukadavu, Tamil Nadu	2019	50 acres	School of Architecture & Planning; School of Agricultural Sciences; School of Arts & Humanities; School of Media & Communication; School of Social & Behavioral Sciences
Kochi	Ponekkara, Kochi, Kerala	1998	125 acres	School of Allied Health Science; School of Life Sciences; School of Dentistry; School of Medicine; School of Nano Sciences; School of Nursing; School of Pharmacy; School of Business
Kochi	Kunnumpuram, Kochi, Kerala	1998		School of Arts & Humanities; School of Media & Communication; School of Commerce; School of Physical Sciences
Amritapuri	Amritapuri, Kollam, Kerala	2002	80 acres	School of Arts & Humanities; School of Physical Sciences; School of Computing & AI; School of Engineering; School of Life Sciences; School of Business; School of Sustainable Development; School of Ayurveda; School of Biotechnology; School of Social & Behavioral Sciences; School of Spiritual & Cultural Studies
Bengaluru	Kasavanahalli, Bengaluru, Karnataka	2002	50 acres	School of Business; School of Engineering; School of Computing & AI
Mysore	Bhogadi, Mysore, Karnataka	2002	5 acres	School of Computing; School of Physical Sciences; School of Arts, Humanities & Commerce; School of Business
Chennai	Vengal, near Chennai, Tamil Nadu	2019	60 acres	School of Engineering; School of Computing & AI
Amaravati	Kuragallu, Amaravati, Andhra Pradesh	2022	200 acres	School of Engineering; School of Computing; School of Business; School of Arts, Humanities & Commerce; School of Sciences
Faridabad	Palwali (RPS City sector 88), Faridabad, Haryana	2022	133 acre	School of Allied Health Science; School of Dentistry; School of Medicine; School of Nursing; School of Pharmacy
Nagercoil	Erachakulam, Nagercoil, Tamil Nadu	2024	110 acres	School of Computing & AI; School of Social & Behavioral Sciences
Haridwar	Missarpur, Haridwar, Uttarakhand	2025	100 acres	School of Computing & AI

== Academics and schools ==
=== Amrita School of Architecture and Planning ===
School of Architecture at Coimbatore Campus offers Bachelor of Architecture (BArch - 5yrs), Bachelor of Design in Interior design programs approved by Council of Architecture.

=== Amrita Schools of Arts and Humanities ===
The schools of Arts and Humanities offers Bachelor of Arts, Master of Arts and PhD in English language & literature in Mysore, Kochi, Coimbatore and Amritapuri campuses. Amritapuri campus offers Online, Certificate, Masters and PhD programs under the departments of Philosophy, Spirutual & Cultural Studies, Hindu Studies, Fine Arts and Sculpting.

=== Amrita Schools of Business ===
The school of Business was started in 1996 in Coimbatore campus and currently 6 campuses - Coimbatore, Bangalore, Kochi, Amritapuri (Kollam), Amaravati and Nagercoil has school of business. The schools offers AACSB accredited residential two-year MBA degree program. In addition, it offers a dual degree program leading to an MS in information technology and MBA in collaboration with State University of New York at Buffalo, for working professionals at the Bangalore campus. Admission and aid to MBA programs is via IIM CAT, CMAT, GMAT and MAT.

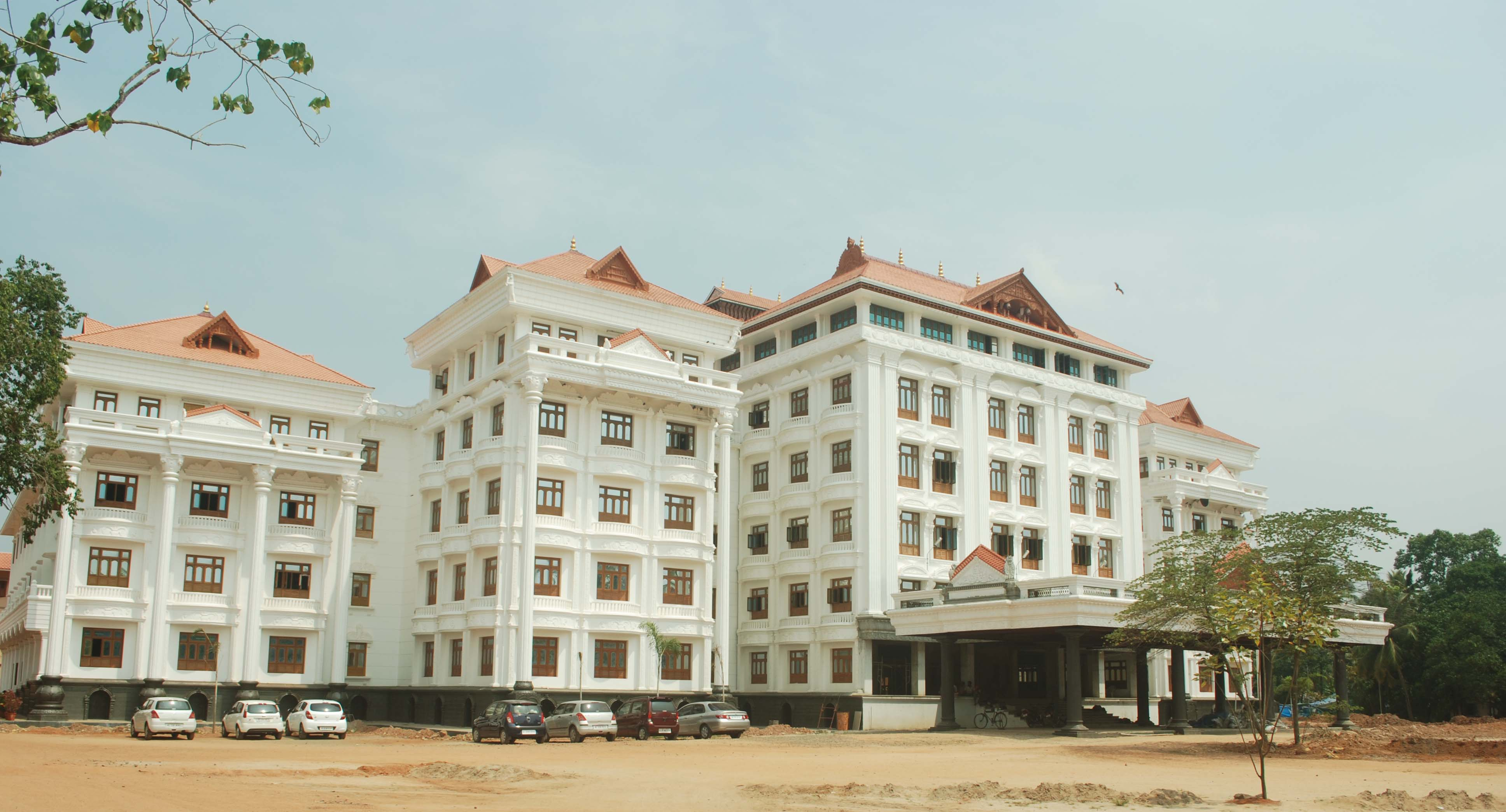
Amrita Vishwa Vidyapeetham - Kollam

Amrita School of Commerce in Coimbatore, Kochi, Mysore and Amritapuri offer Bachelor of Commerce, Bachelor of Business Administration (BBA), Master of Commerce (MCom) in Accounting, Taxation and Finance.

=== Amrita School of Biotechnology ===
The school under faculty of life sciences was started in September 2004 and offers B.Sc. and M.Sc. in Biotechnology, B.Sc. and M.Sc. in Microbiology, and M.Sc. in Bioinformatics, as well as Ph.D. degree programs. Its research spans a wide spectrum including Cell Biology, Molecular Biology, Cancer Biology, Cell-line Engineering, Wound Healing, Computational Neuroscience, Neurophysiology, Phytochemistry, Biomedical Engineering, Proteomics, RNAi, Analytical Chemistry, Snake Venoms, Sanitation Biotechnology.

The Amrita School of Biotechnology is approved as a Center of Relevance and Excellence (CORE) in Biomedical Technology under the Department of Science and Technology, Government of India, TIFAC Mission REACH programs. The School of Biotechnology was selected by the DBT-BIRAC (Government of India) and the Bill & Melinda Gates Foundation as one of the top six innovators in India to develop next generation sanitation solutions using bacteriophages and other biocontrol agents.

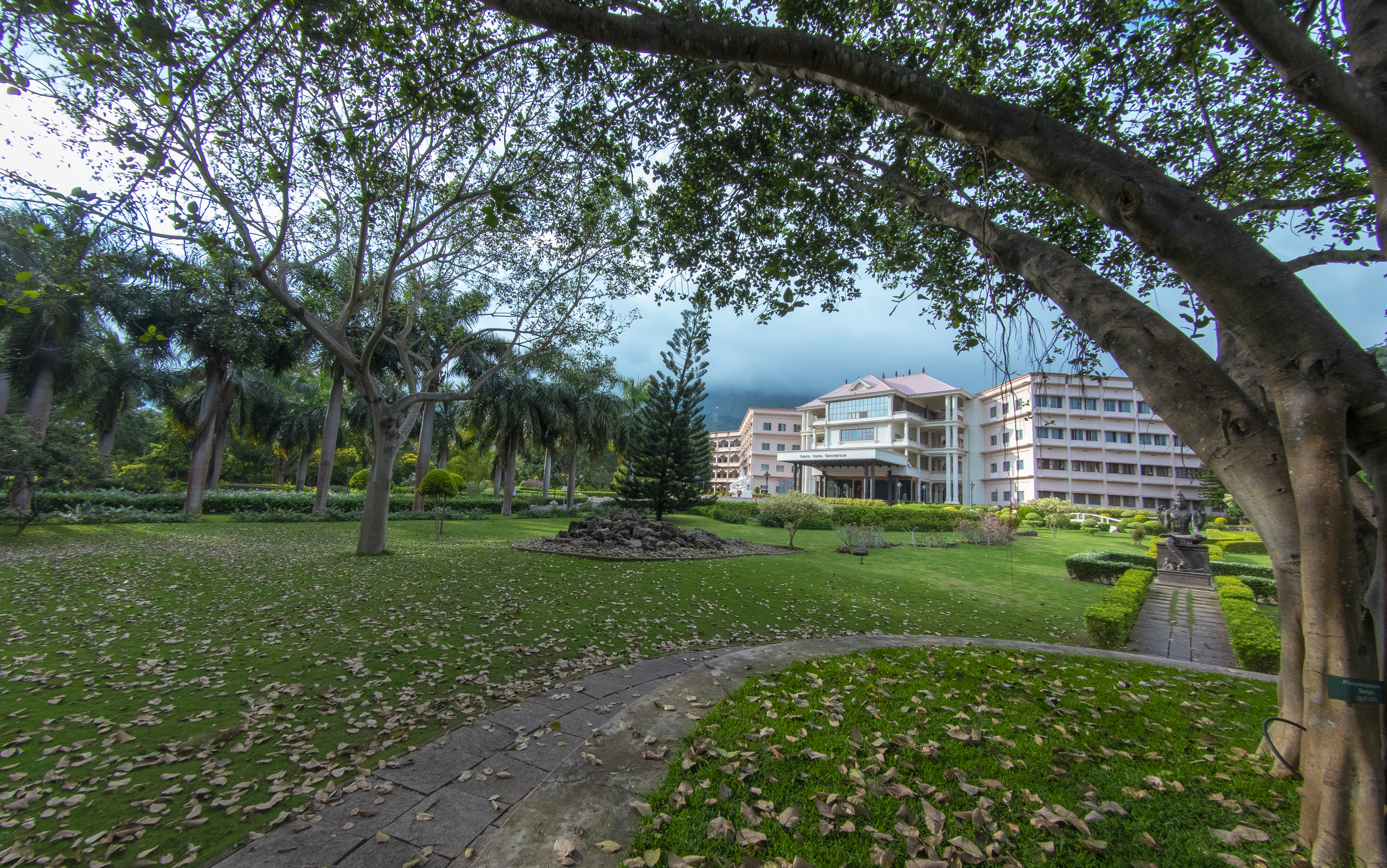
Amrita Vishwa Vidyapeetham Coimbatore

=== Amrita School of Mass Communication ===
The school at Coimbatore campus offers B.A. and M.A. degree programs in Communication for careers in journalism, new media/animation, and short film making and advertising, based on the UNESCO model curriculum.

Mysore campus offers Bachelor of Science (B.Sc.) in Visual Media, Integrated M.Sc. in Visual Communication, Master of Science in Visual Communication (M.Sc.), Master of Arts (M.A) in Journalism and Mass Communication and Master of Arts in Visual Media and Communication, Digital Film Making & Media Production, Animation and Design programs.

Kochi campus offers B.Sc. (Honours) in Visual Media & Communication, B.Des(Honours) in Communication Design, M.A. Visual Media & Communication, M. A. Journalism and Mass Communication, M.F.A. (Visual Media) Animation & VFX, M.F.A. Visual Media (Applied Art and Advertising).

=== Amrita Schools of Engineering ===
The university has schools of engineering in seven of its ten campuses, and offers undergraduate, post-graduate and doctoral programs under the departments of Computer science and engineering, Electronics and Communication engineering, Electrical and electronic engineering, Artificial intelligence, Mechanical engineering, Civil engineering, Chemical engineering and Aerospace engineering. The Amrita School of Engineering, Coimbatore was opened as private college in 1994 and predates the deemed university by 7 years. Other campuses include Bengaluru, Amritapuri (Kollam), Chennai, Amaravati, Nagercoil and Haridwar. Admission to B.Tech programs are based on Amrita Engineering Entrance Exam (AEEE), SAT (for NRI) and JEE Main. Admission to the MTech Programs are based on the Graduate Aptitude Test in Engineering (GATE).

Alongside seven schools of Engineering & Computing, The Kochi campus school of Nanotechnology offers MTech in Nanomedicine, Molecular Medicine and Nanotechnology and Renewable Energy. The Faridabad campus school of health sciences offers MTech in Artificial Intelligence and Medical Engineering.

=== Amrita International school of law ===
Amrita School of Law in Coimbatore campus offers 5-year integrated B.A. LL.B., B.B.A. LL.B., and LL.M. programs.

=== Amrita School of Sciences ===
Amrita School of sciences in Coimbatore, Amaravati, Amritapuri, Kochi, Mysore offers Bachelor of Computer Applications (BCA), Master of Computer Applications (MCA), BSc, MSc & PhD programs under the departments of Mathematics, Physics, Chemistry, Data Science, Environmental Science, Computing & IT, Food Science and Agriculture

=== Amrita School of Social & Behavioral Sciences ===
Amrita School of Social Sciences in Coimbatore, Faridabad, Mysore and Amritapuri offers BA, MA and PhD programs under the departments of Psychology, Cognitive Sciences, Economics, Social Work and Social Policy.

=== Amrita health campuses ===
Amrita has two healthcare campuses in Kochi and Faridabad attached to the Amrita Hospital, Kochi and Amrita Hospital, Faridabad, super-specialty hospitals in India. It contains schools of medicine, dentistry, health sciences, nursing, pharmacy, Ayurveda and physiotherapy. Kochi hospital with 1300-beds is the university's healthcare initial campus. A second medical school and 2,000 bed hospital campus was set up in Faridabad in 2021. The campuses offer MBBS, Bachelor of Dental Surgery, MD, MS, DM, MCh in medicine, MHA (Masters in Hospital Administration), undergraduate/graduate programs in nursery, pharmacy & allied health sciences programs.

Amritapuri campus offers Bachelor of Ayurveda, Medicine and Surgery and MS, MD in AYUSH. The School of Medicine offers graduate programs including M.Sc. in disciplines, Diplomate of National Board (DNB), and PhD. In 2008, the first batch of MBBS students graduated with A. P. J. Abdul Kalam presiding over the graduation ceremony.

=== Amrita Online ===
In 2021, the university introduced various online degree programs under the centre name Amrita Online. Amrita Online serves students from 50+ countries and all 28 Indian states, demonstrating its extensive global and national reach. The online programs are UGC entitled. Some of the prominent online programs include Bachelor of Commerce (B.Com), Bachelor of Business Administration (BBA), Master of Business Administration (MBA), Master of Commerce (M.Com), M.Com in International Finance and Accounting (Benchmarked with CPA, USA), Bachelor of Computer Applications (BCA), Master Computer Applications (MCA) with specialisations in Artificial Intelligence, Data science, Cyber Security and Software Engineering. In 2025, new MBA specialisations in Business Analytics, Financial Technology (FinTech), and Environmental, Social, and Governance (ESG) were introduced in academic partnership with Grant Thornton.

== Research ==
Amrita University conducts extensive research across various disciplines, collaborating with industry, government bodies, hospitals, organisations, and foreign universities. In 2024, 27 researchers from Amrita were recognised among the world's top 2% of scientists by Stanford University, up from 22 in 2023. Amrita has over 70 interdisciplinary Centers of excellence across all campuses, has currently involved in over 500 active research projects, has published more than 16,000 research papers, received over USD 100M funding and has been granted over 150 patents.

Nobel laurate Kailash Satyarthi and global economist Jeffrey Sachs are only people to receive Honorary Doctorate from Amrita University.

== Rankings and accreditation ==
University rankings

General – international
- QS (Asia) (2023): 301-350
- Times (World) (2022): 801–1000

General – India
- NIRF (Overall) (2024): 18
- NIRF (Research) (2024): 33
- NIRF (Universities) (2024): 7

Engineering – India
- NIRF (2024): 23

Medical – India
- NIRF (2024): 8

Business/Management – India
- NIRF (2024): 28

Pharmacy – India
- NIRF (2024): 13

Dental – India
- NIRF (2024): 14

According to the National Institutional Ranking Framework (NIRF) by the Indian Ministry of Education, Amrita University was ranked 7th among universities, 23rd in engineering, 8th in medical, 28th in management, 33rd in Research, 13th in pharmacy, 14th in dental and 18th position in overall category in India for the year 2024.

In the 12th edition of Times Higher Education World University Rankings, Amrita has been placed in the list of 601-800 category. It is also in Top 200 in Young University Rankings 2020 and in Top 90 in BRICS & Emerging Economies Rankings 2020. QS World University Rankings ranked Amrita in band 801-1000 and 168th in BRICS University Rankings 2020. In 2023, Amrita has been ranked among the Top 50 in the world by THE University Impact Rankings. It is also 1st in India.

Amrita School of Business has got accreditation from Association to Advance Collegiate Schools of Business (AACSB).

Amrita's B.Tech and B.Pharm programs are accredited by National Board of Accreditation.

Amrita School of Medicine is the first institute in India to get accredited by National Accreditation Board for Hospitals & Healthcare Providers. All of its labs are accredited by National Accreditation Board for Testing and Calibration Laboratories. It is also accredited by International Organization for Standardization.

== Student life ==
=== Student bodies ===
Every campus has various academic and extra curricular student clubs. Team Bi0s, Amritapuri campus CSE student body works on Cyber security and aspire students to take part in Hackathons and competitions.

=== Festivals ===
Every school in each campus hoists various tech and cultural fests annually. Anokha tech fest at Coimbatore campus, Vidyuth multi fest at Amritapuri campus, Dastaan multi fest at Bengaluru campus, Tantrotsav tech fest at Chennai campus are few of the popular fests in South India.

=== Physical education ===
All campuses have facilities for multiple indoor and outdoor sports, gym and synthetic playfields. The Coimbatore campus houses an Olympic standard swimming pool.

== Notable people ==
- RJ Balaji, Indian RJ and commentator
- Lijomol Jose, Indian actress
- Muhammed Muhsin, politician - Communist Party of India

== See also ==
- Amrita Vidyalayam, network of CBSE schools in India
