= Yodlee =

American personal finance software company

- Type: Private company
- Industry: Financial
- Founded: 1999; 27 years ago
- Founder: Venkat Rangan
- Headquarters: Redwood City, California, United States
- Key people: Farouk Ferchichi (President)
- Parent: STG
- Website: www.yodlee.com

Yodlee is a web application software company that provides consumer-permissioned data aggregation, consolidating information from multiple accounts (credit cards, bank accounts, investments, etc.) by using open banking APIs.

== Origins and history ==
Yodlee was created in 1999 as a free service. It offered a single website to input access information for other accounts, such as banks, investment brokers, credit cards, travel reservation services, shopping sites and news sites. Yodlee offered the technology for individuals to transfer money between savings and checking accounts and pay a bill online, as well as collect all of a consumer's financial information, including student loans, mortgage information, credit cards, 401(k), for a bank or personal finance website. Its services were used by over 200 financial institutions, including Citibank and Bank of America.

Yodlee started operations in Sunnyvale, California and then moved its headquarters to Redwood Shores, California. It also has offices in London, UK, and Bangalore, India. In 2000, Yodlee merged with its main competitor in the data aggregation space, an Atlanta-based company called VerticalOne, which was owned at the time by SecurityFirst, an internet banking firm.

In 2010, Yodlee partnered with Y Combinator, providing its financial services platforms to all Y Combinator–funded companies. Yodlee then was said to have raised at least $116 million over its 10-year lifespan.

As of 2013, Yodlee had over 45 million users, and over 150 financial institutions and portals (including 5 of the top 10 U.S. banks) offer services powered by Yodlee.

On October 3, 2014, Yodlee went public on Nasdaq, trading under the symbol YDLE. It raised $75 million at $12 per share. On August 10, 2015 Yodlee sold itself to Envestnet for a reported $660 Million. As a result, it is no longer listed on the Nasdaq. In November 2017, Token partnered with Yodlee for payments and financial data aggregation.

In June 2025, Envestnet announced the sale of Yodlee to the private equity firm, STG.

== Lawsuit ==
Yodlee encountered a controversy in which lawmakers claim that they are selling consumers’ personal financial data without proper consent, calling on the Federal Trade Commission to investigate the matter. In August 2020, a class-action lawsuit was filed against Envestnet and Yodlee. The plaintiff, Deborah Wesch, claimed that she and other consumers were put at risk because the companies failed to adequately protect their consumer data and put in place sufficient security protocols. Yodlee and Envestnet claimed that the consumers consented to have their data accessed, and that the consumers didn't experience any tangible injuries from the sale of their anonymized data.

== See also ==
- Plaid (company)
