= Amrita Hospital, Faridabad =

Private Hospital in India

Amrita Hospital
- Mata Amritanandamayi Math

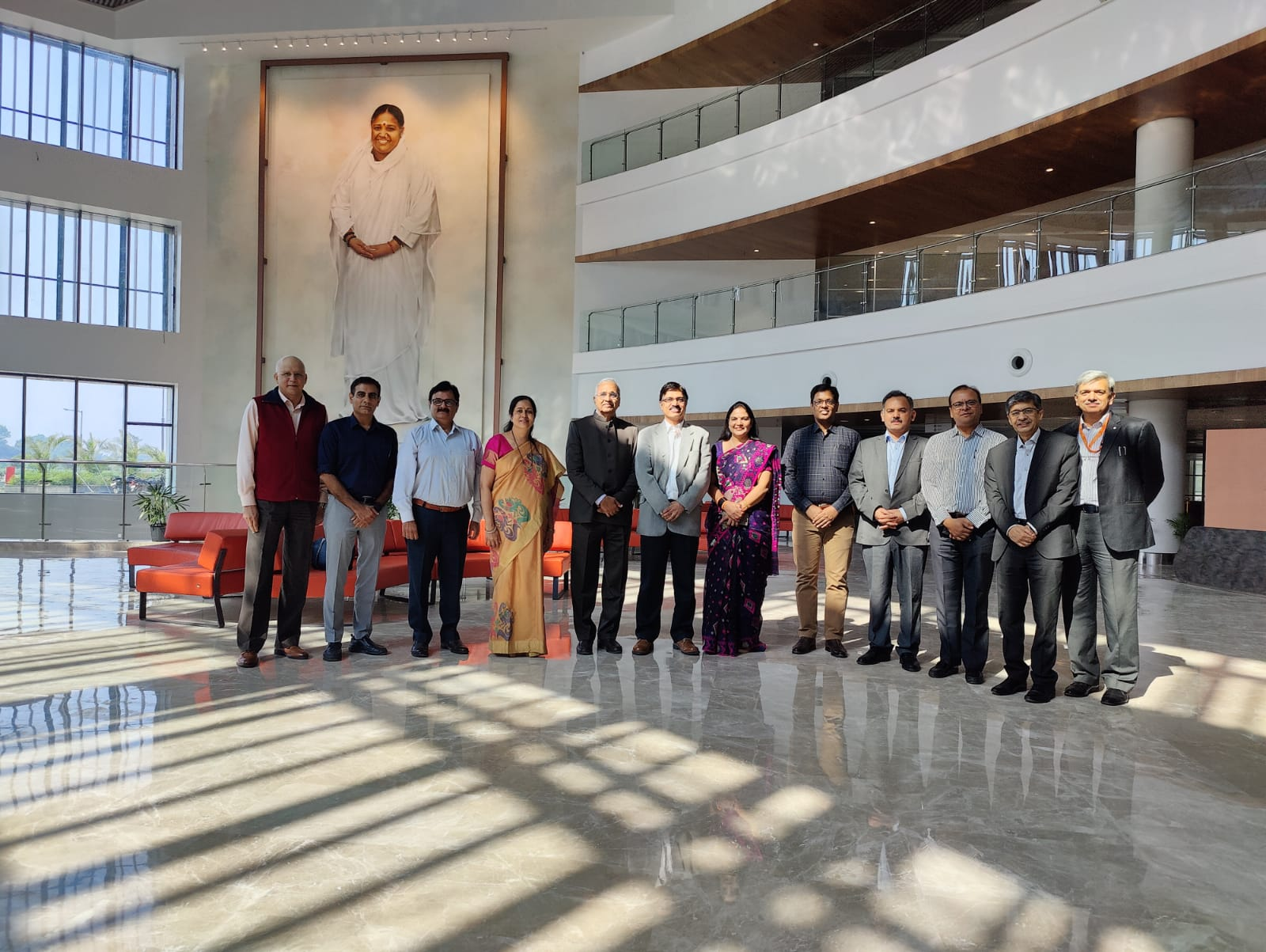

Geography
- Location: Mata Amritanandamayi Marg, RPS City, Sector 88, Faridabad, Haryana, India
- Coordinates: 28°25′32.7″N 77°21′17.8″E

Organisation
- Care system: tertiary
- Type: Multi-speciality and Superspeciality, research
- Affiliated university: Amrita Vishwa Vidyapeetham
- Patron: Mata Amritanandamayi Devi
- Network: Amrita Hospitals

Services
- Emergency department: Yes
- Beds: 2600

Helipads
- Helipad: Yes

History
- Constructed: 2020
- Opened: August 2022

Links
- Website: amritahospitals.org/faridabad/
- Lists: Hospitals in India

Amrita Hospital is a private tertiary care hospital in Faridabad, NCR Delhi, India. It is the largest private multi-specialist and superspeciality hospital in Asia, and was inaugurated by Prime Minister Narendra Modi. It has 2,600 beds, 81 specialities, 64 fully-networked modular operation theatres and smart ICUs with 534 critical care beds and a helipad on the roof. It is one of the world's largest hospitals by capacity. It is affiliated to Amrita Vishwa Vidyapeetham School of medicine.

== Construction ==
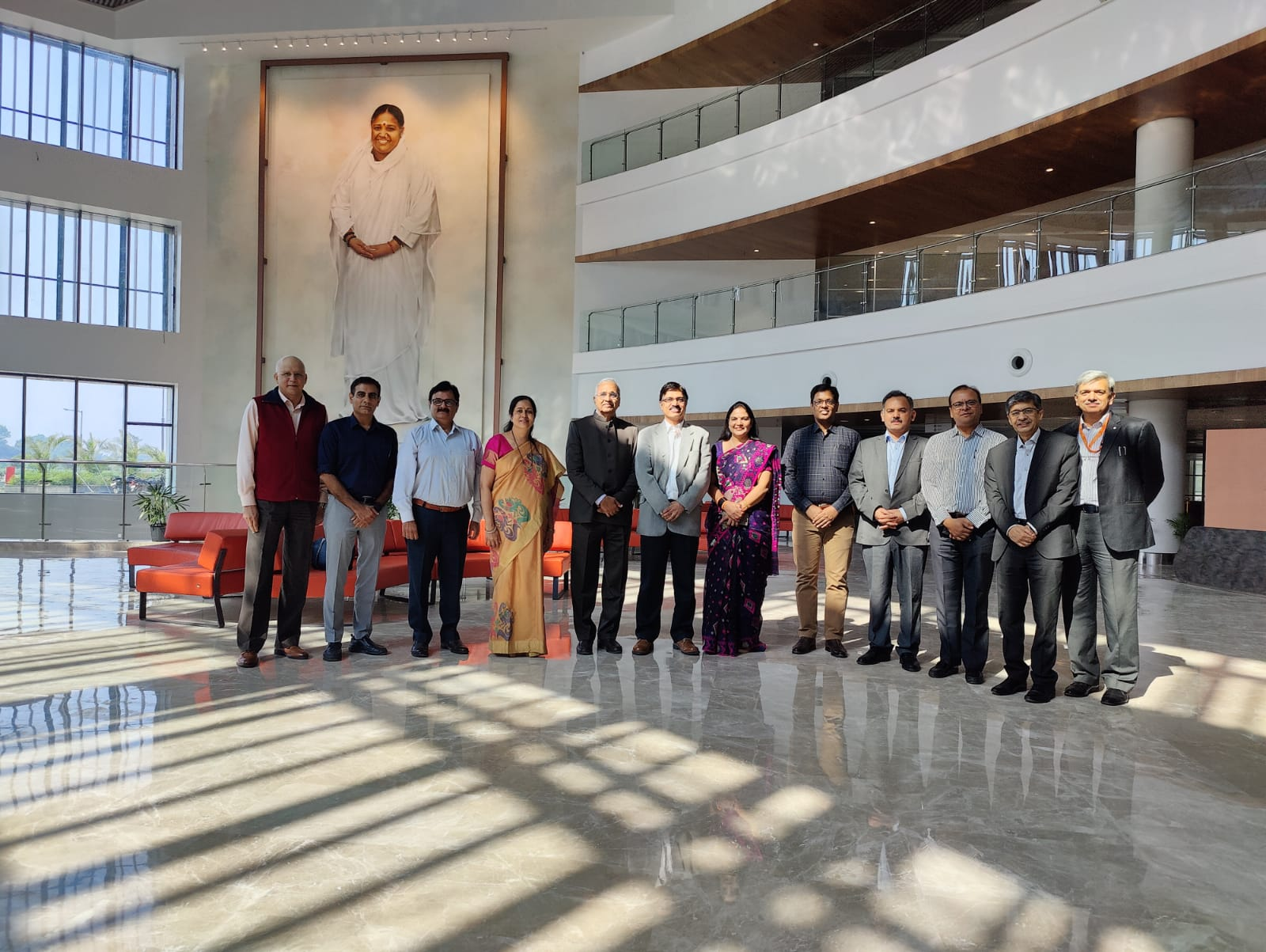
Amrita Hospital, faridabad

The hospital is spread over 130 acres with a built up area of 3.6 million square feet. It has nursing colleges and college for Allied Health Sciences and has a seven-story research block and eight centres of excellence. The price of construction was estimated to be 60 billion rupees.

== Inauguration ==
The hospital was inaugurated on 24 August 2022 by Prime Minister of India, Narendra Modi and facilitated by Sadguru Mata Amritanandamayi Devi in the presence of Chief minister of Haryana Manohar Lal Khattar, Deputy chief minister Dushyant Chautala, and Governor of Haryana Bandaru Dattatreya. Stanford Medical school prof Dr. Michael Snyder was also keynote speaker in the event.
