= Amrita Hospital, Kochi =

Amrita Hospital (അമൃത ആശുപത്രി)
- Amrita Vishwa Vidyapeetham
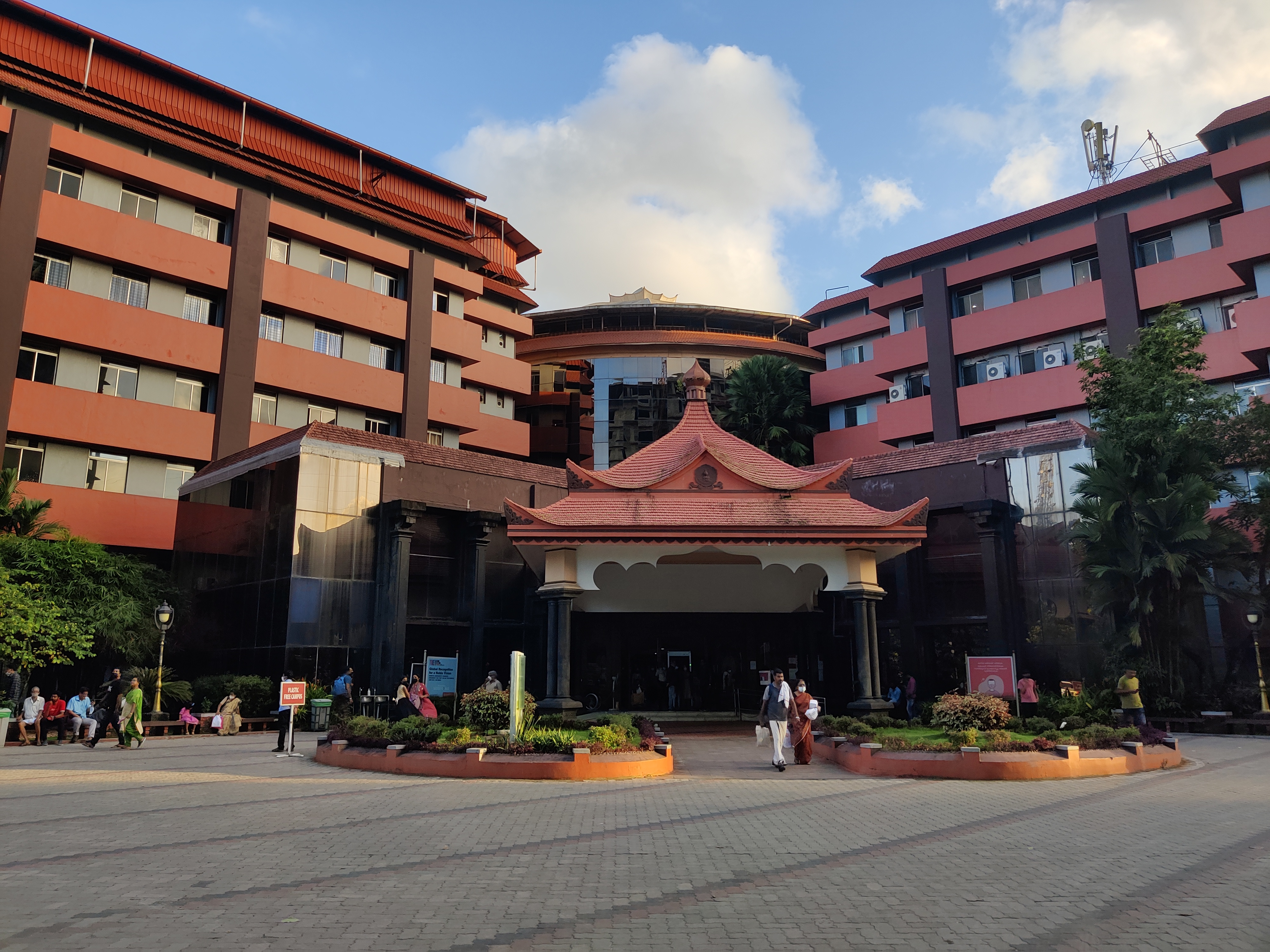
- Main block

- Location within Kerala Location within India

Geography
- Location: Kerala, Edapally, Kochi, Kerala, India
- Coordinates: 10.0328°N 76.2930°E

Organisation
- Care system: Tertiary
- Type: Super-specialty
- Affiliated university: Amrita Vishwa Vidyapeetham
- Patron: Mata Amritanandamayi
- Network: part of Amrita University

Services
- Emergency department: Yes
- Beds: 1,450

History
- Former name: -
- Founded: 1998 May 17

Links
- Website: www.amritahospitals.org/kochi/
- Lists: Hospitals in India

Amrita Hospital, formerly known as Amrita Institute of Medical Sciences (AIMS) is a multi-speciality tertiary care hospital based in Kochi, India. It is attached to Amrita School of Medicine and is one of the largest medical facilities in India with a total built-up area of over 3.33 million sq.ft, spread over 125 acres of land. It is a 1,450-bed hospital which supports an annual patient volume of about 800,000 outpatients and 50,000 inpatients. It was founded by Mata Amritanandamayi and inaugurated on 17 May 1998 by the then Prime Minister, Atal Bihari Vajpayee. The Mata Amritanandamayi Math is its parent organisation. The campus also houses medical school, dentistry, nursing, health sciences, pharmacy schools and school of nanosciences and molecular medicine of Amrita Vishwa Vidyapeetham.

Prem Nair is the medical director of the institution. Dr.Gireesh Kumar K.P. is the Principal/Dean of Amrita School of Medicine. The hospital has got accreditation from the National Accreditation Board for Testing and Calibration Laboratories (NABL) for its laboratories and the National Accreditation Board for Hospitals and Healthcare Providers (NABH) for the hospital overall. In 2022, Amrita School of Medicine was ranked the eighth best medical college in India by the Ministry of Human Resource Development in their annual NIRF rankings.

== Overview ==
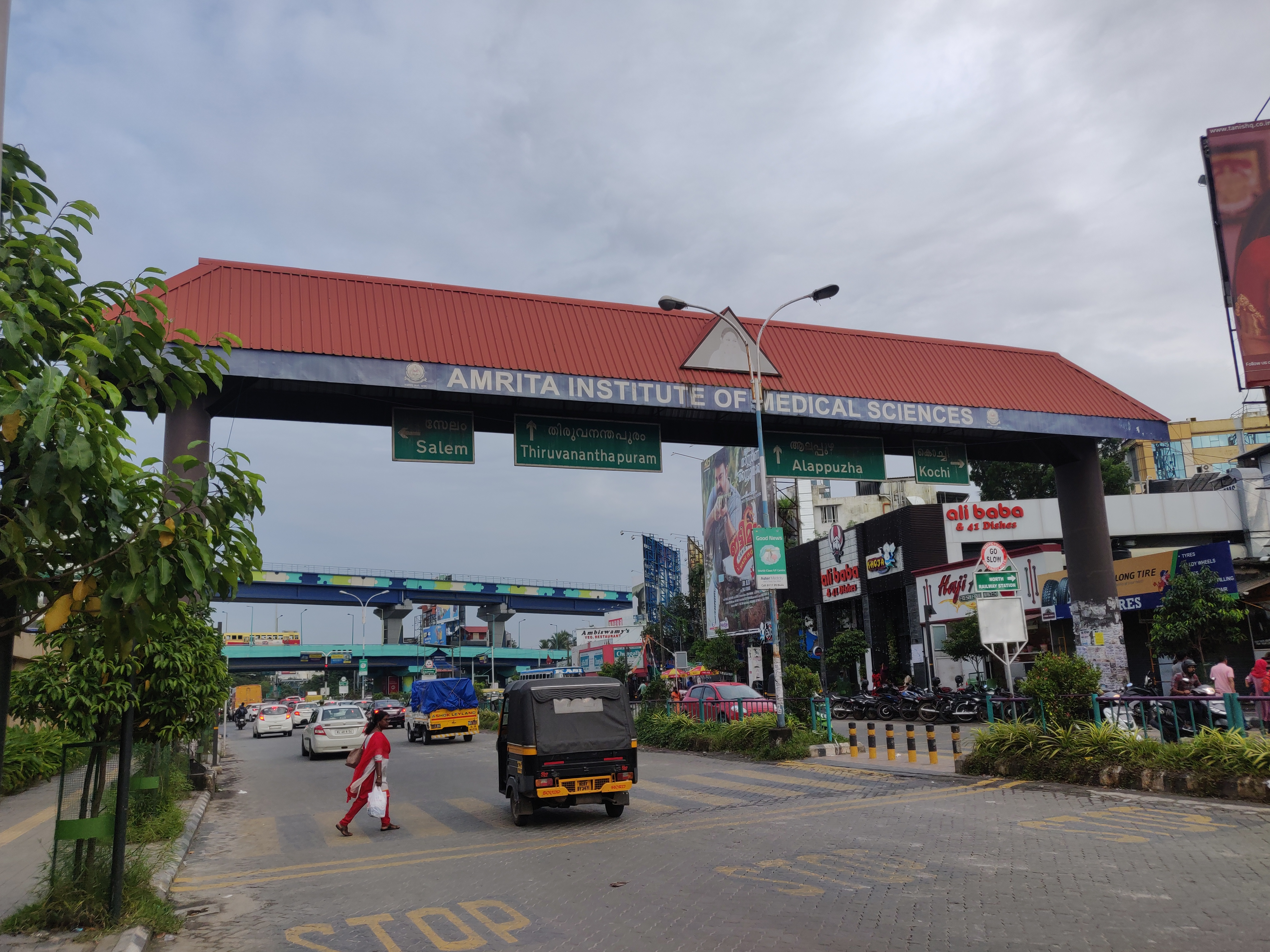
Edapally Toll Junction name board with Amrita

Amrita Hospital at Kochi offers facilities consisting of 31 modern operating theatres, 275 equipped intensive care beds, a fully computerised and networked Hospital Information System (HIS), a fully digital radiology department, a 24/7 telemedicine service and a clinical laboratory. The healthcare infrastructure along with the medical school has a built-up area of 3.33 million sq. ft and is spread across 125 acres of land. The Amrita University Medical School has 17 Centres of Excellence and 29 Speciality Departments supported by 670 faculty members and 4,000 support staff.

The foundation stone for a second Amrita Hospital in Faridabad, Haryana was laid on May 9, 2016, to serve the Delhi National Capital Region. With 2,400 beds and 81 speciality departments, it is India's largest private hospital. The new facility was opened on 24 August 2022, by the Prime Minister of India, Narendra Modi.

== Research and development ==
=== Development of nanomedicine with ability to kill drug resistant cancer ===
On 16 October 2012, AIMS announced that it had developed a nanomedicine for treating drug resistant cancer cells for leukaemia.

== Awards ==
=== National Healthcare Excellence Award 2013 ===
In December 2013, the Federation of Indian Chambers of Commerce and Industry (FICCI) awarded AIMS with the ‘National Healthcare Excellence Award 2013’ for the best hospital in the country. The award is in recognition of the hospital's outstanding work toward the "betterment of healthcare" and its efficient and timely service.

=== National Healthcare Excellence Awards 2016 ===
In September 2016, the Federation Of India Chamber Of Commerce & Industry (FICCI) awarded AIMS with two 'Nation Healthcare Excellence Awards'. AIMS won the awards for the categories of 'Patient Safety' and 'Innovation in Medical Technology.' The 'Innovation in Medical Technology' award was accepted by Dr. Mahesh Kappanayil for developing a 3D printing model in congenital heart surgery. The 'Patient Safety' award was accepted by Dr. Sanjeev Singh for his work on patient safety and antibiotic stewardship.

== Controversies ==
=== Nurses' strike demanding wage hike ===
In December 2011, nurses at the Amrita Institute of Medical Sciences and Research Centre went on strike against the hospital management, demanding a wage hike. This was part of a series of statewide strikes by nurses throughout Kerala. The strike was called when leaders of the United Nurses' Association claimed that they were beaten by members of the hospital staff. Later, police was summoned to stop the protests, and they resorted to batons to disperse the protestors. Management claimed that the operations would not be affected even if the nurses continued their indefinite strike. They stated that hundreds of nursing graduates who were Amritanandamayi's devotees were waiting to serve patients at the hospital. Finally, a consensus was reached between the hospital management and the protestors, wherein the charges against the protestors would be withdrawn by the hospital management and their demand for wage hike would be considered.

=== Allegation of illegal drug trials ===
In August 2012, Indiavision television channel reported that the Amrita Institute of Medical Sciences and Research Centre and many hospitals in Kerala were testing new drugs on patients selected through free medical camps. Kerala minister for health, V. S. Sivakumar said the incident would be investigated. The accusations against the hospital were subsequently found to be false.

=== Conversion therapy ===
The hospital allegedly forced a trans-woman to undergo conversion therapy, an unscientific and harmful practice banned in India by the National Medical Commission.

== See also ==
- List of medical colleges in India
- Amrita School of Medicine
- Amrita Hospital, Faridabad
