= Deemed university =

Types of universities in India

In India, a deemed university or deemed-to-be-university is an accreditation granted to higher educational institutions by the Ministry of Education under Section 3 of University Grants Commission Act 1956.

The Indian Institute of Science is the first institute to be granted deemed university status on 12 May 1958. According to the government's definition, the accreditation indicates, "an Institution of higher education, other than universities, working at a very high standard in specific area of study" and the accreditation grants "the academic status and privileges of a university".

According to the UGC section 3 "The expression 'University' means a University established or incorporated by or under a Central Act, a Provincial Act or a State Act, and includes any such institution as may, in consultation with the University concerned, be recognized by the Commission in accordance with the regulations made in this behalf under this Act."

== Deemed university status ==
Universities in India are recognized by the University Grants Commission(UGC), which draws its power from the University Grants Commission Act, 1956. In addition to this, 15 Professional Councils are established, controlling different aspects of accreditation and coordination. A deemed-to-be university may be either a government-funded or a privately managed institution, however, unlike private universities established under State Legislative Acts, deemed university status can only be conferred by the Central Government's Ministry of Education on the recommendation of the UGC.

The status of a deemed to be university allows full autonomy in courses, syllabus, admissions and fees. As of August 2025, the UGC lists 146 institutes which were granted the deemed to be university status. According to this list, the first institute to be granted deemed university status was Indian Institute of Science which was granted this status on 12 May 1958. The state with the most deemed universities is Tamil Nadu with 28 universities having deemed status.

Section 12 (B) of the UGC Act of 1956 also grants the UGC the right to "allocate and disburse, out of the Fund of the Commission, grants to Universities..." As such, the UGC categorizes institutes as either "declared fit to receive Central/UGC assistance under Section 12 (B) of the UGC Act–1956", or not, and notes this status at the lists published. Updates to these declarations are done in meetings of the UGC and published in the minutes. As of August 2025, 67 institutes are categorized as fit to receive Central/UGC assistance.

The UGC has also warned deemed-to-be-university institutions against using the term “University” independently in their names, directing them to use “Deemed to be University” or “Deemed University”. Such institutions are not universities established by a central or state Act, but are higher education institutions granted university-equivalent academic status and autonomy under the UGC framework.

== Other types ==
Other types of universities under the regulatory purview of the UGC include:

- Central universities, or Union universities are established by Act of Parliament and are under the purview of the Department of Higher Education.
- State universities are run by the state government of each of the states and territories of India, and are usually established by a state legislative assembly act.
- Institute under State Legislature Act is an Institution established or incorporated by a State Legislature Act, in India. Institutes that are 'under State Legislature Act' enjoy academic status and privileges of state universities.
- State private universities are established under the State Act approved by the UGC. They can grant degrees but they are not allowed to have off-campus affiliated colleges.

== See also ==
- List of deemed universities
- List of universities in India
