= Mata Amritanandamayi =

Indian Hindu spiritual leader (born 1953)

Mātā Amritānandamayī Devī
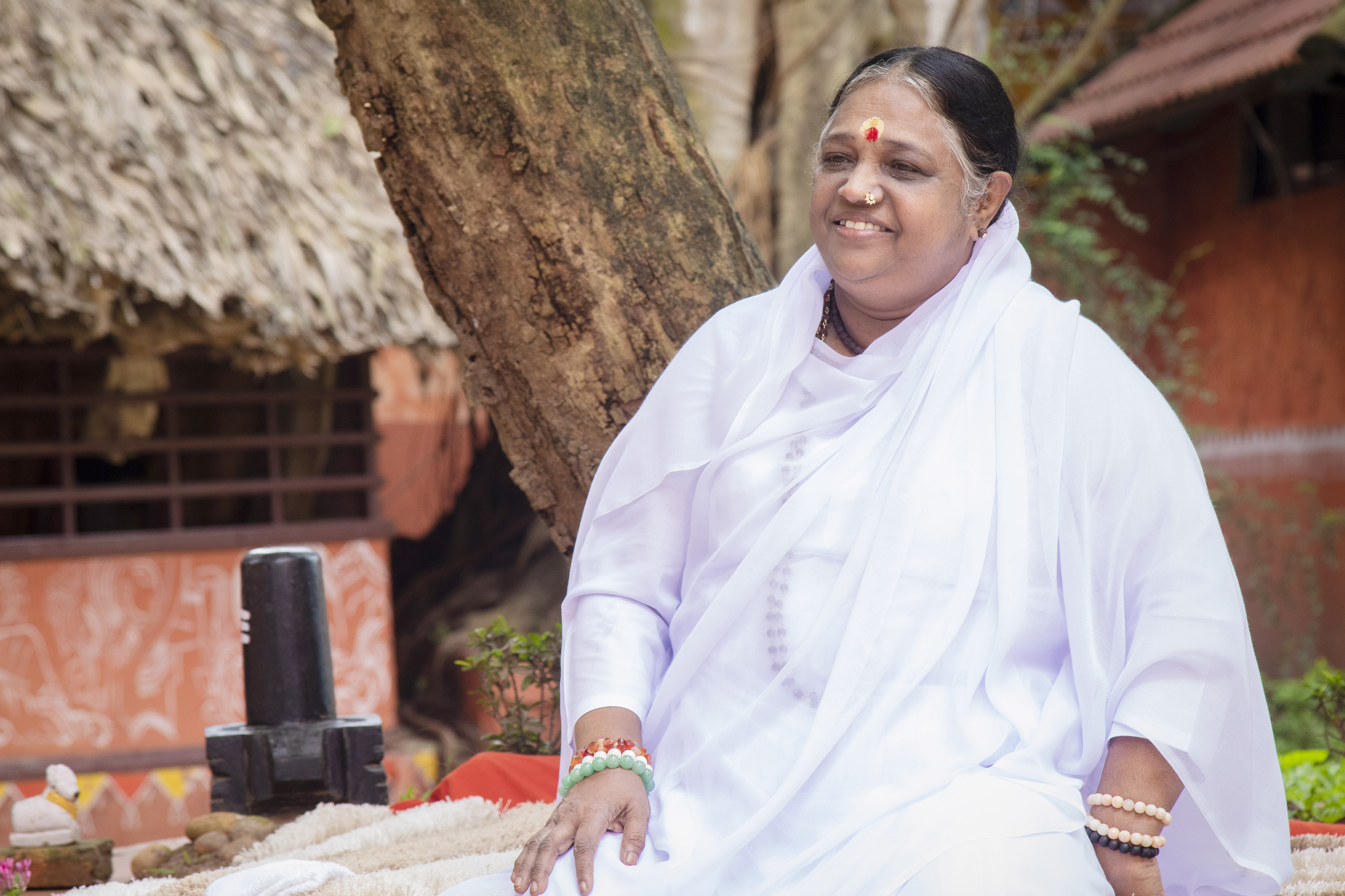
- Amritānandamayī in 2019
- Title: Amma; Satguru; Mata

Personal life
- Born: Sudhamani Idamannel; 27 September 1953 (age 73) Vallikavu, Clappana, Karunagappally, Kollam, State of Travancore–Cochin (now in Kerala), India
- Notable works: Awaken Children (1–9); Compassion: the Only Way to Peace; May Peace and Happiness Prevail; Infinite Potential of Women; Unity is Peace; Living in Harmony; Man and Nature; May Your Hearts Blossom; Understanding and Collaboration Between Religions; The Awakening of Universal Motherhood; Cultivating Strength and Vitality
- Honors: Gandhi-King Award
- Website: amma.org

Religious life
- Religion: Hinduism
- Founder of: Mātā Amritānandamayī Math

Sri Mātā Amritānandamayī Devi (born Sudhamani Idamannel; 27 September 1953), often known as Amma ("Mother"), is an Indian Hindu spiritual leader, godwoman, guru and humanitarian. She is the chancellor of Amrita Vishwa Vidyapeetham, a multi-campus research university.

In 2018, she was felicitated by Indian Prime Minister Narendra Modi for making the largest contribution to the Government of India's Clean India Campaign Swachh Bharat Mission. She was the first recipient of Vishwaratna Puraskar (Gem of the World Award) by Hindu Parliament.

== Life ==
Mātā Amritānandamayī Devi is an Indian guru from Parayakadavu (now partially known as Amritapuri), Alappad Panchayat in Karunagappally, Kollam District, in the state of Kerala. Born to a Arayan fishing family, who is subcaste of Dheevara (disadvantaged community) on 27 September 1953, she was the third child of Sugunanandan and Damayanti. Her mother Damayanti died on 19 September 2022. She has six siblings.

As part of her chores, Amṛtānandamayī gathered food scraps from neighbours for her family's cows and goats, through which she was confronted with the intense poverty and suffering of others. She would bring these people food and clothing from her own home. Her family, which was not wealthy, scolded and punished her. Amṛtānandamayī began to spontaneously embrace people to comfort them in their sorrow. Despite the reaction of her parents, Amṛtānandamayī continued. Regarding her desire to embrace others, Amṛtānandamayī commented, "I don't see if it is a man or a woman. I don't see anyone different from my own self. A continuous stream of love flows from me to all of creation. This is my inborn nature. The duty of a doctor is to treat patients. In the same way, my duty is to console those who are suffering."

Amṛtānandamayī rejected numerous attempts by her parents to arrange for her marriage. In 1981, after spiritual seekers had begun residing at her parents' property in Parayakadavu in the hopes of becoming Amṛtānandamayī's disciples, the Mātā Amṛtānandamayī Math (MAM), a worldwide foundation, was founded. Amṛtānandamayī continues to serve as chairperson of the Math. Today the Mata Amritanandmayi Math is engaged in many spiritual and charitable activities.

In 1987, at the request of devotees, Amṛtānandamayī began to conduct programmes in countries throughout the world, which she continues annually.

== Darshan ==
Amṛtānandamayī's is known for giving darshana by hugging people. She has embraced more than 33 million people throughout the world for over 30 years. She has said this practice began when people would come to tell her their troubles and cry in her lap. In response, she began to hug people.

When asked, in 2002, to what extent she thought her embraces helped the ills of the world, Amṛtānandamayī replied, "I don't say I can do it 100 percent. Attempting to change the world [completely] is like trying to straighten the curly tail of a dog. But society takes birth from people. So by affecting individuals, you can make changes in the society and, through it, in the world. You cannot change it, but you can make changes. The fight in individual minds is responsible for the wars. So if you can touch people, you can touch the world."

Amṛtānandamayī's darshan has been the centrepiece of her life, as she has received people nearly every day since the late 1970s. Given the size of the crowds coming to seek Amṛtānandamayī's blessings, there have been times when she has given darshana for more than 20 continuous hours. At the time of Covid-19 she stopped giving darshana and hugging people.

== Teachings and public image ==
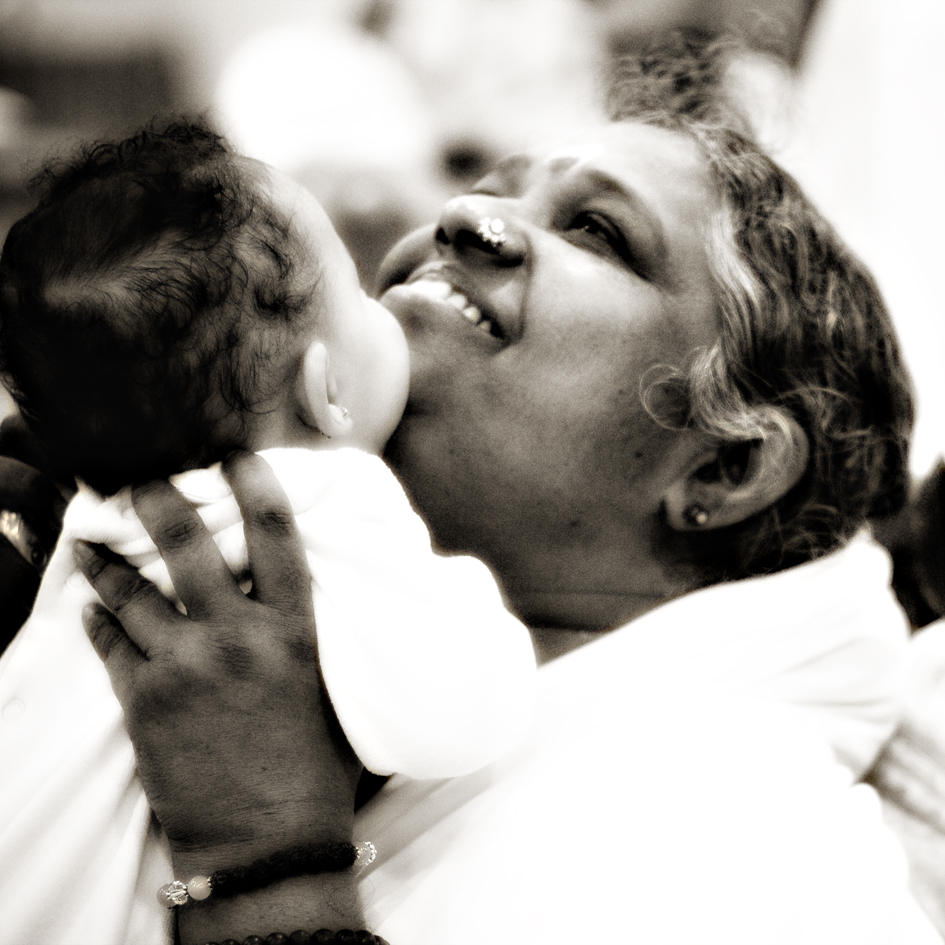
Mata Amritanandamayi Devi (Amma) embraces a child.

In the book The Timeless Path, Swami Ramakrishnananda Puri, one of Amṛtānandamayī's senior disciples, wrote: "The [spiritual] path inculcated by Amma is the same as the one presented in the Vedas and recapitulated in subsequent traditional scriptures such as the Bhagavad Gita." Amṛtānandamayī herself says, "karma [action], jñana [knowledge] and bhakti [devotion] are all essential. If the two wings of a bird are devotion and action, knowledge is its tail. Only with the help of all three can the bird soar into the heights." She accepts the various spiritual practices and prayers of all religions as but different methods toward the same goal of purifying the mind. Along these lines, she stresses the importance of meditation, performing actions as karma yoga, selfless service, and cultivating divine qualities such as compassion, patience, forgiveness, self-control, etc. Amṛtānandamayī has said that these practices refine the mind, preparing it to assimilate the ultimate truth: that one is not the physical body and mind, but the eternal, blissful consciousness that serves as the non-dual substratum of the universe. This understanding itself Amṛtānandamayī referred to as jivanmukti [liberation while alive]. Amṛtānandamayī said, "Jivanmukti is not something to be attained after death, nor is it to be experienced or bestowed upon you in another world. It is a state of perfect awareness and equanimity, which can be experienced here and now in this world, while living in the body. Having come to experience the highest truth of oneness with the Self, such blessed souls do not have to be born again. They merge with the infinite."

Amritanandamayi is known for frequently referring to herself in the third person as "Amma", which is a common spiritual practice in Hinduism.

== Social issues ==
In her public talks and in articles, Amritanandamayi has taken up several social issues, including the importance of selfless service, the need for inter-religious harmony, for environmental protection and of desegregating science and spirituality. She also regularly speaks on the importance of women's empowerment and gender equality as well as that of humankind cultivating what she refers to as viśva-mātrutvam — an attitude of motherliness towards all beings in creation, specifically through expressing compassion, patience and selflessness. She has also spoken out against human trafficking and forced prostitution, speaking at the Vatican and signing the Universal Declaration Against Slavery in an event organized by Pope Francis at the Vatican in 2014. And in 2018, under the patronage of Mohammed bin Zayed Al Nahyan, the Crown Prince of Abu Dhabi, she participated in a similar event aimed at protecting children from abuse and predation via the Internet. In July 2015, Amritanandamayi delivered the keynote address at a United Nations Academic Impact conference on technology and sustainable development, co-hosted by Amrita University. There, she requested the scientific community to infuse its research with awareness and compassion, stressing the importance of keeping the aim of uplifting the poor and suffering in mind when undertaking technological research. She has spoken several times at the United Nations and twice at the Parliament of the World's Religions.

== Bhajans ==
Amṛtānandamayī has recorded more than 1,000 bhajans, or devotional songs, in 35 languages. She has also composed dozens of bhajans and set them to traditional ragas. Regarding devotional singing as a spiritual practice, Amṛtānandamayī says, "If the bhajan is sung with one-pointedness, it is beneficial for the singer, the listeners, and Nature as well. Later when the listeners reflect on the songs, they will try to live in accordance with the lessons enunciated therein." Amṛtānandamayī has said that in today's world, it is often difficult for people to attain deeply focused concentration in meditation. A person can be aided in reaching this level of concentration with bhajans.

== Humanitarian work ==
Amritanandamayi is founder and chairman of the Mata Amritanandamayi Math and the founder of Embracing the World. Embracing the World is a global network of local and regional charitable organizations and projects that has grown out of the Mata Amritanandamayi Math's India-based charitable projects. The organizations' focus is on providing the poor with the five basic needs of food, shelter, healthcare, education and livelihood. The organizations also conduct work in the fields of disaster relief and environmental protection as well as on conducting research and developing new technologies to help the poor and needy.

=== Food ===
In India, the Mata Amṛtānandamayī Math provides 10 million free meals to poor people annually via its various centres. Likewise, Embracing the World feed more than 150,000 annually in North America through 49 centres that conduct a program called Mother's Kitchen, started in 1987. Other feed-the-hungry programs exist in Mexico, Costa Rica, France, Spain, Kenya, Brazil, Slovenia and Australia. The Math is deploying filtration systems with the goal of providing clean drinking water in 5,000 village centres throughout India, which would provide water purification to 10 million villagers.

=== Shelter ===
Since 1998, the Mata Amritanandamayi Math has constructed over 47,000 houses for the homeless in 75 locations throughout India. It runs an orphanage for 500 children in Kerala, and Embracing the World manages a children's home in Nairobi.

=== Healthcare ===
The Mata Amritanandamayi Math manages the 1,100-bed super-speciality hospital Amrita Institute of Medical Sciences in Kochi, which it launched in 1998, as well as several other free healthcare clinics, medicine dispensaries, hospices in India. It is also in the process of constructing a 2,000-bed hospital in Delhi NCR. In total, the math has provided totally free medical care and surgeries to more than four million people since 1998. This includes super-specialty surgeries including heart surgeries, brain surgeries and kidney transplants. Aside from free treatment, Amrita Institute provides care on a sliding scale, allowing people to pay what they can afford. This is often a minimal percent of the total medical cost.

On 24 August 2022, another hospital named Amrita Hospital was inaugurated by the Prime Minister of India Narendra Modi in Faridabad, Haryana. This hospital is reportedly the largest private hospital ever built in India, with a built up area of 3.6 million square feet and a capacity of 2600 beds.

=== Livelihood ===
In 1998, the Math started a program titled Amrita Nidhi that provides lifetime pensions to destitute widows and to people who are physically and mentally challenged. As of 2019, a total of 100,000 people were enrolled. It also started AmritaSREE (Self-Reliance, Empowerment & Employment) in 2006. This program has helped more than 200,000 women form self-help groups throughout India.

=== Education ===
Amṛtānandamayī is founder and chancellor of Amrita University, an eight-campus, multi-disciplinary research university that in 2020 was ranked as the fourth-best university in India by NIRF, is accredited with an 'A++' grade by NAAC, and was selected as an "Institute of Eminence" by the Indian Government in 2019.

Even as of 2026 it is ranked the 8th best University in India according to NIRF, 17th overall, 23rd in B.Tech, 21st in Management, 31st in Research, 14th in Dental and 9th in Medicine(Kochi). It is ranked 37th Globally by Times Higher Education (THE) Sustainability Impact Rating for contributions to the UN SDG.

Under her guidance, the university puts a strong focus on research-and-development to uplift the sick and poor. The Mata Amṛtānandamayī Math also runs a scholarship program that currently provides 50,000 scholarships for economically challenged children throughout India, and Embracing the World provides scholarships outside of India in times of need, such as in the wake of Typhoon Haiyan in the Philippines.

=== Disaster relief ===
Within India, the Mata Amṛtānandamayī Math has been involved in relief-and-rehabilitation efforts following natural disasters since 2001, and Embracing the World has come to aid in the wake of several disasters outside of India as well. Embracing the World has provided a total of $75 million in disaster-relief work since 2004. The disasters after which the Mata Amṛtānandamayī Math and Embracing the World have conducted relief-and-rehabilitation work include: the 2001 Gujarat earthquake, the 2004 Indian Ocean earthquake and tsunami, Hurricane Katrina (2005), the 2008 Bihar flood, the 2005 Gujarat flood, the Maharashtra floods of 2005, Cyclone Aila of 2009, the 2010 Haiti Earthquake, the 2011 Tōhoku earthquake and tsunami, the 2013 North India floods, Typhoon Haiyan in 2013, the 2014 India–Pakistan floods, the May 2015 Nepal earthquake, the 2015 South Indian floods, the Puttingal temple fire of 2016, Hurricane Maria of 2017, Cyclone Ockhi of 2017, the 2018 Kerala floods, and the 2019 Kerala floods. In 2019, the Math gave Rs. 500,000 to each of the families of the 40 CRPF soldiers who were killed in the 2019 Pulwama attack.

=== Environmental protection ===
On 11 September 2015, Amṛtānandamayī donated US$15 million to the Government of India's Namami Gange "Clean the Ganges" program for the specific purpose of constructing toilets for poor families living along the Ganges River. On 27 September 2015, Amṛtānandamayī pledged that her NGO would dedicate the value of another US$15 million to toilet construction and other sanitation efforts specifically in the Indian state of Kerala. Amritanandamayi's organization has been cleaning the Pampa River and Sabarimala Kerala Temple pilgrimage site annually since 2012.

== Controversies ==
=== Book by Sreeni Pattathanam ===
Sreeni Pattathanam, the Kerala-based head of the Indian Rationalist Association, wrote Matha Amritanandamayi: Sacred Stories and Realities, a controversial critique first published in 1985. The author said all the "miracles" of Amṛtānandamayī were falsified. It was further written that there had been many suspicious deaths in and around her ashram that required police investigation.

On 9 August 2002, a Deshabhimani, a left-leaning Malayalam daily, published a similar account, demanding investigation into the same deaths Pattathanam found suspicious. On 24 September 2002, Deshabhimani officially apologised for the report, publishing an article titled "Report that Suspicious Deaths at Amritanandamayi Math Are Growing Was Incorrect". The article stated: "We now state with conviction that there was nothing suspicious about deaths that happened in the Math. Some of the deaths mentioned in the article did not even take place at the Math." The article went on to explain that relatives of the deceased had personally contacted Deshabhimani in order to correct the misinformation conveyed in the original article. In several cases, the editors noted the relatives had contacted Deshabhimani to explain they were at the bedsides of elderly kin who had died of natural causes, with no suspicious aspects regarding the passings.

In 2004, the Kerala State Government sanctioned criminal prosecution of Patthathanam, the owner of the publishing company, and the printer of the book on grounds that religious sentiments had been offended and for the libelous statements in the book. The order followed directions from the Kerala High Court to the Home Department for considering an application by T. K. Ajan, a resident of the Mata Amṛtānandamayī Math. CPI leader Thengamam Balakrishnan protested the move against Pattathanam. The contents of this book in English: Mata Amritanandamayi & Mysterious Stories. 4 October 2020.

=== Source of foreign aid ===
In June 2007, Shantanu Guha Ray wrote in Tehelka weekly that Amṛtānandamayī Math, Ravi Shankar, Baba Ramdev, and other NGOs and religious organisations had large annual turnover of INR crores. In June 2007, novelist Paul Zacharia wrote on Tehelka that Amṛtānandamayī is free from the typical scrutiny on money that has foreign connections.

=== Allegations by Gail Tredwell ===
In 2013, Gail Tredwell, a former disciple of Amṛtānandamayī, self-published a memoir of her 1980–99 tenure in Amṛtānandamayī's ashram. She made some allegations in this memoir as well as media interviews which preceded and followed the release of the book. The allegations, including the claim that Tredwell was physically assaulted by Amṛtānandamayī, have not been substantiated. Both Amṛtānandamayī and representatives of her ashram denied the allegations, saying that they were untrue and were aimed at exacting revenge for unfulfilled desires. In an interview in April 2014, Amṛtānandamayī spoke in depth about the incident, saying, "Even now, Amma is only filled with love for that daughter. I am praying that virtue and goodness come. Time will shine forth the truth."

== Attacks ==
In August 2005, Amṛtānandamayī was attacked by a man named Pavithran. He was sitting with other followers praying and singing in front of Amṛtānandamayī. He rushed to Amṛtānandamayī with a knife, but was overpowered by a group of disciples. Amṛtānandamayī's disciple Swami Amritaswarupananda Puri said Pavithran was of "unstable mind". Pavithran was bruised and taken to a hospital. Amritanandamayi, who forgave Pavithran, said, "All those who are born will die one day. I am going ahead keeping this reality in mind. I will carry on. I will continue to give darshan to the devotees coming here to meet me."

On 1 August 2012, Satnam Singh Mann, a 23-year-old law student from Bihar, charged Amṛtānandamayī at her ashram in Kollam. According to police, he was screaming and reciting words in Arabic. He was overpowered by the crowd, who handed him over to the police. He was later taken to the government mental hospital in Peroorkada, Thiruvananthapuram, where he died three days later.

== Awards and honours ==
- 1993, President of the Centenary Parliament of World Religions' (Parliament of the World's Religions)
- 1993, Hindu Renaissance Award as "Hindu of the Year" (Hinduism Today)
- 1998, Care & Share International Humanitarian of the Year Award (Chicago)
- 2002, Karma Yogi of the Year (Yoga Journal)
- 2002, Gandhi-King Award for Non-Violence by The World Movement for Nonviolence (UN, Geneva)
- 2005, Mahavir Mahatma Award (London)
- 2005, Centenary Legendary Award of the International Rotarians (Cochin)
- 2006, James Parks Morton Interfaith Award (New York)
- 2006, The Philosopher Saint Sri Jnaneswara World Peace Prize (Pune)
- 2007, Le Prix Cinéma Vérité (Cinéma Vérité, Paris)
- 2010, The State University of New York awarded Amma an honorary doctorate in humane letters on 25 May 2010 at its Buffalo campus.
- 2012, Amma featured in the Watkins' list of the top 100 most spiritually influential living people in the world.
- 2013, Awarded first Vishwaretna Purskar (Gem of the Word Award) by Hindu Parliament on 23 April 2013 at Thiruvananthapuram (India)
- 2013, Awarded proclamation on behalf of the State of Michigan to Amma commemorating Amma's 60th birthday, the official proclamation describes Amma as a true citizen of the world and recognizes Amma's charitable works worldwide.
- 2014, Chosen as one among the 50 most powerful women religious leaders by The Huffington Post.
- In 2014, Mata Amritanandamayi had refused to accept the Padma awards of 2014.
- 2018, Felicitated by Prime Minister Narendra Modi for largest contribution to the Government of India's Clean India Campaign Swachh Bharat Mission
- 2019, Honorary Doctorate of Letters from the University of Mysore
- 2023, Chair, Civil 20, an official Engagement Groups of the G20

== Positions ==
- Founder and chairperson, Mata Amṛtānandamayī Math
- Founder, Embracing the World
- Chancellor, Amrita Vishwa Vidyapeetham University
- Founder, Amrita Vidyalayam schools
- Founder, Amrita Hospitals (Kochi & Faridabad)
- Parliament of the World's Religions, International Advisory committee member
- President Swami Vivekananda's 150th birth anniversary celebration committee, India
- Member, Elijah Interfaith Institute Board of World Religious Leaders
- Chairperson,Civil 20 (engagement group of G20 India) 2022–2023

== Publications and documentaries ==
Amṛtānandamayī's disciples have transcribed her conversations with devotees and spiritual seekers to create approximately a dozen books of her teachings known as Awaken Children. The addresses she has delivered at various international forums have also been published in book form. Beginning in April 2011, a bi-weekly message from Amṛtānandamayī has appeared in the Lifestyle section of the Express Buzz Sunday supplement of the New Indian Express newspaper. She also writes a regular blog in the spiritual publication The Speaking Tree.

She has been featured in various documentaries and films:

- 1999 River of Love: A Documentary Drama on the Life of Ammachi
- 2000 Louis Theroux's Weird Weekends – "Indian Gurus" (BBC-TV)
- 2005 Darshan: The Embrace – directed by Jan Kounen
- 2007 In God's Name – directed by Jules and Gédéon Naudet
- 2015 Un plus une – directed by Claude Lelouch starring Jean Dujardin and Elsa Zylberstein
- 2016 Science of Compassion – a Documentary on Amma, Sri Mata Amritanandamayi Devi — directed by Shekhar Kapur

== See also ==
- Amrita movement
