= University Grants Commission Act, 1956 =

Act of the Parliament of India

Parliament of India
- Long title: An Act to make provision for the co-ordination and determination of standards in Universities and for that purpose, to establish a University Grants Commission.
- Citation: Act No. 3 of 1956
- Territorial extent: India
- Enacted by: Parliament of India
- Assented to by: President of India Rajendra Prasad
- Assented to: 3 March 1956
- Commenced: 5 November 1956
- Status: In force (amended)

The University Grants Commission Act, 1956 is an Act of the Parliament of India. The Act is sometimes referred to as "the UGC Act" and, among other things, regulates central assistance for public universities.
