= Mata Amritanandamayi Math =

Charity Organization of Spiritual Leader Sri Mata Amritanandamayi Devi

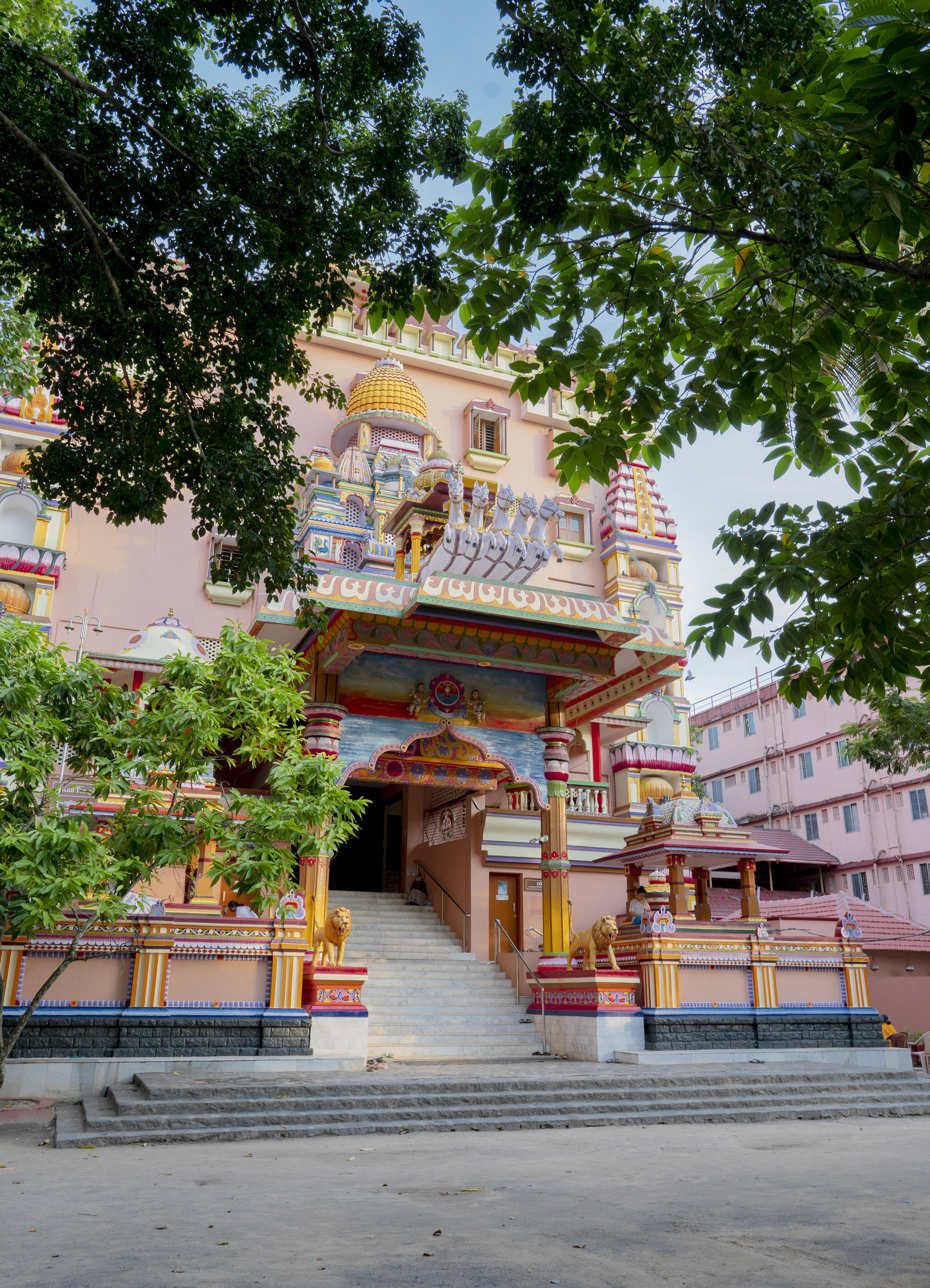
- A global humanitarian conglomerate under the leadership of Amma, Sri Mata Amritanandamayi Devi.
- Formation: 1981; 45 years ago
- Founder: Mata Amritanandamayi Devi
- Purpose: Spiritual, Humanitarian, Education
- Headquarters: Amritapuri, Paryakadavu, Karunagappally municipality, Alappad, Kollam district, Kerala, India
- Coordinates: 9°04′48″N 76°29′24″E
- Region served: Worldwide
- Products: Matruvani magazine
- Website: https://www.amritapuri.org

The Lotus of supreme devotion blossoms within and immanent knowledge arises as a result of the inner purification attained through the performance of selfless actions, using the instruments of the mind and the intellect. Such people who, through the proper integration of jnana ( #knowledge ), bhakti ( #devotion ), and karma ( #action ), become the embodiment of the divine sound Aum, spread a sweet and divine fragrance throughout the entire world. The lotus leaves = mind and intellect The lotus flower = devotion Water = action The sun = knowledge The conch = the sacred sound, Aum.

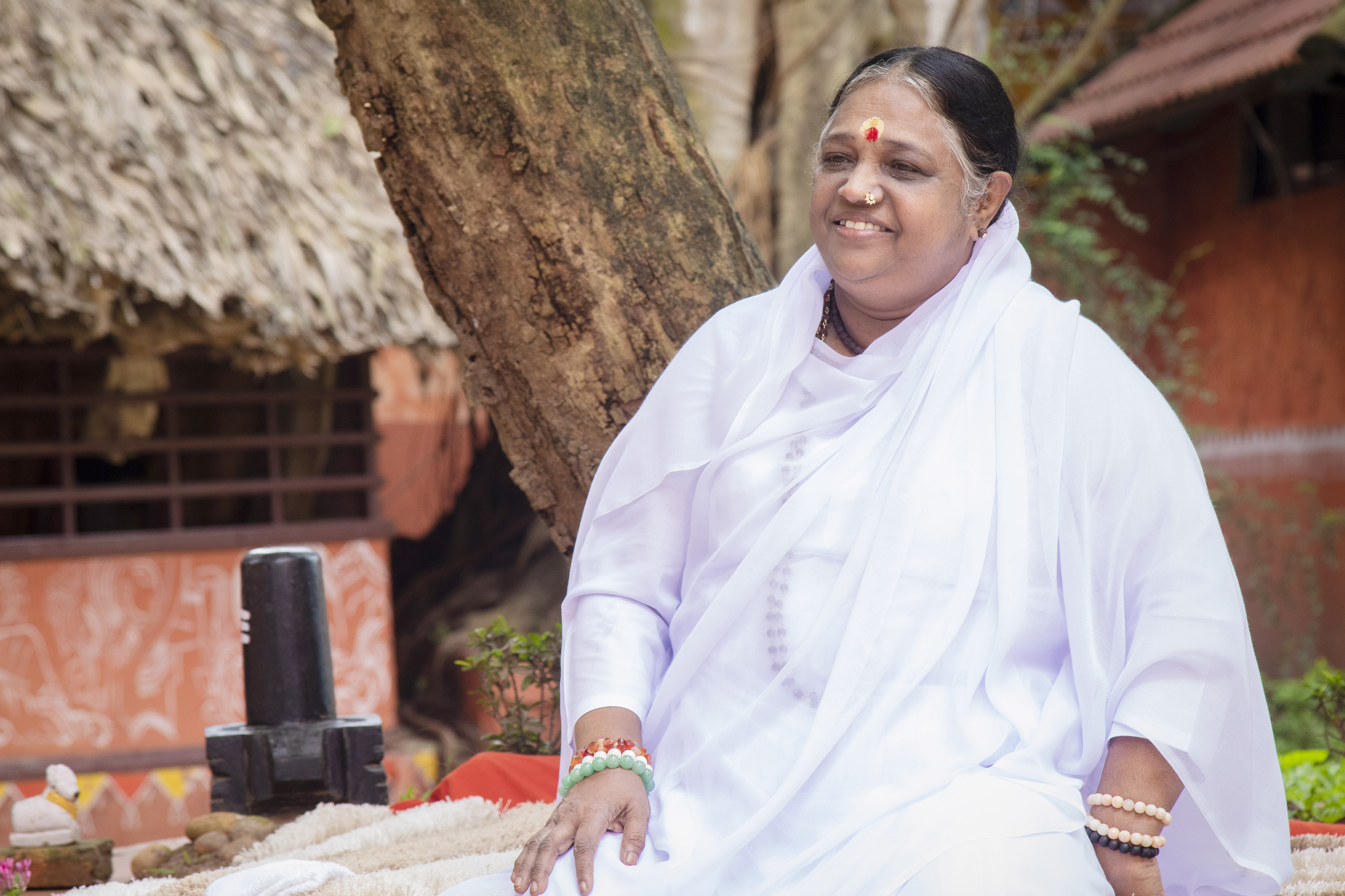
Sri Mata Amritanandamayi Devi..

The Mata Amritanandamayi Math (MAM) is an international charitable organization aimed at the spiritual and material upliftment of humankind. It was founded by Indian spiritual leader and humanitarian Mata Amritanandamayi in 1981, with its headquarters in Paryakadavu, Alappad Panchayat, Karunagappally municipality, Kollam district, Kerala and is also known as Amritapuri. Along with its sister organization, the Mata Amritanandamayi Mission Trust, MAM conducts charitable work including disaster relief, healthcare for the poor, environmental programs, fighting hunger and scholarships for impoverished students, amongst others. It also runs the seven-campus university known as Amrita Vishwa Vidyapeetham, 90 chain of English medium CBSE schools known as Amrita Vidyalayam, and classes in yoga, meditation and Sanskrit.

MAM is a volunteer organization, basing its activities on the principle of karma yoga (work as an offering to the divine). Its headquarters are home to more than 3,000 people, a mix of householders, monastics and monastic students. People make the pilgrimage to MAM every day in order to receive the blessings of Mata Amritanandamayi.

MAM, along with Amritanandamayi's other centers and organizations throughout the world function collectively under the umbrella title of Embracing the World.

== Association with the United Nations ==
On July 24, 2005, in recognition of MAM's outstanding disaster-relief work and other humanitarian activities, the United Nations conferred Special Consultative Status to MAM, with its Economic and Social Council (ECOSOC), thus enabling collaboration with UN agencies. In December 2008, the UN's Department of Public Information approved MAM as an associated nongovernmental organization to help its work of disseminating information and research into humanitarian issues.

== Charitable Activities ==
=== Disaster Relief ===
Beginning with the 2001, the Mata Amritanandamayi Math has consistently dedicated volunteers and resources in response to disasters within India. Its most extensive disaster-relief program followed the 2004 Indian Ocean earthquake and tsunami. In response, MAM provided a value of $46 million in relief, including the construction of 6,200 tsunami-resistant houses in India and Sri Lanka, as well as 700 new fishing boats. It also constructed a multimillion-dollar bridge providing Alappad Panchayat, a tsunami-at-risk peninsula community, an evacuation route to the mainland. MAM has provided a combination of medical care, food, shelter, monetary aid and other forms of relief following the flooding of Karnataka and Andhra Pradesh in 2009, Bihar in 2008, and Gujarat in 2005 and Bombay in 2005, as well as the Kashmir-Pakistan earthquake of 2005. It also reconstructed 1,200 homes following the 2001 Gujarat earthquake.

In connection with its sister organizations, such as the Mata Amritanandamayi Center in the United States, it also has responded to disasters outside India as well, including medical supplies, blankets and care for orphans following the 2010 Haiti earthquake, a donation of $1 million U.S. to the Bush-Clinton Katrina Fund, following Hurricane Katrina, and $1 million U.S. in relief aid to victims of the 2011 Tōhoku earthquake and tsunami, with a focus on children orphaned in the disaster.

=== Empowering Women ===
MAM's Amrita SREE program was launched in 2006, with the goal of aiding 100,000 women through the development of 5,000 self-help groups. As of January 2011, there are more than 6,000 such groups, with more than 100,000 women participating throughout India. MAM has also set up an additional 1,000 self-help groups in Andaman Island. Through providing vocational education, start-up capital, marketing assistance and access to microcredit loans and microsavings accounts, the Amrita SREE program equips unemployed and economically vulnerable women with the skills and means to set up small-scale, cottage-industry businesses. As of January 2011, MAM has helped 3,500 groups to receive microcredit loans to expand their businesses, benefitting more than 60,000 families. In the aftermath of the 2004 Asian tsunami, India's coastal communities found that the aquatic creatures —upon which they relied so heavily for sustenance—had been entirely disrupted. As with so many of their needs, hopes and sorrows, they brought this crisis to Amma. It was then that Amma, who recognized an urgent need for an alternate livelihood for every family in the tsunami-affected areas, launched the Ashram's first community-based self-help programmes. It was Amma's firm resolve that at least one member in each family engage in a profession that was not reliant upon increasingly unpredictable weather patterns. To that end, Mata Amritanandamayi Math (MAM) facilitated training in the following vocations:

Tailoring: MAM established nine tailoring schools and distributed 2,000 sewing machines—one to every program participant. Nursing: 450 women were provided free training in nursing assistance along with a stipend to study at AIMS (Amrita Institute of Medical Sciences—MAM's super-specialty charitable hospital). Driving: 500 youths received free driving lessons and received driver's licenses to facilitate employment as professional bus, truck and taxi drivers. Education: Seven eligible women received full scholarships to attend Amrita University Mysore's School of Education and earned master's degrees in Education. Handicrafts: 1,500 women trained in making coir (coconut fiber) and coir-based products and over 150 women trained in handloom weaving. Electronic Repair: 200 youths trained in niche trades including mobile phone and TV/VCR repair; plumbing; fashion design and handmade bag production.

=== Plumbing Lessons For Women ===
AMMACHI (Amrita Multi-Model Applications using Computer-Human Interaction) labs of Amrita Engineering college has developed a plumbing course administered through simulation and haptic technologies.

=== Homes & Slum Renovation ===
In 1997 MAM launched its Amrita Kuteeram housing program, an initiative to build 25,000 homes for the homeless throughout India. In 1998, keys to the first 5,000 homes were distributed. The initial target was reached in 2002. Currently MAM is striving to build another 100,000 homes. As of January 2011, more than 40,000 such homes have been constructed. These homes include 1,200 built in order to rebuild three villages following the 2001 Gujarat earthquake and 6,200 built in order to replace homes destroyed by the Indian Ocean tsunami. Amrita Kuteeram homes have thus far been built in Rajasthan, Uttar Pradesh, Madhya Pradesh, Gujarat, Maharashtra, West Bengal, Andhra Pradesh, Orissa, Pondicherry, Karnataka, Tamil Nadu, Kerala and Andaman Island. Through its sister organization, the Mata Amritanandamayi Center, houses have also been constructed in Sri Lanka. Often Amrita Kuteerams are built not as single homes but as entire villages, complete with town halls, roads, wells, electricity, sewage systems and clean drinking water.

=== Community Outreach ===
MAM runs a number of programs aimed at the upliftment of the general community. These include Amrita Nidhi, a financial-aid program started in 1998 that provides monthly pensions for 50,000 widows and physically and mentally disadvantaged individuals. The pensions are given for life. It is MAM's stated goal to provide 100,000 such pensions.

MAM also runs four homes for the elderly, one in Sivakasi, Tamil Nadu, one in Kottayam, Kerala, and two in Karnataka (Karwar and Bangalore). The care homes include prayer halls where community functions and cultural programs are held on a regular basis.

For the benefit of youth, MAM runs a program called AYUDH, a movement to empower young people to integrate universal values into their daily lives. Members take part in service activities, including caring for the elderly, homeless and physically disadvantaged.

Meditation classes are also offered free to the general public. Monastic disciples and other volunteers teach Mata Amritanandamayi's Integrated Amrita Meditation Technique (IAM Technique) throughout the world. The technique is regularly being taught at schools, businesses, and at the request of the Indian government, to the 1.3 million members of India's paramilitary.

Other Community Outreach programs include sponsored weddings for impoverished couples, a prisoner's welfare project (through MA Center in USA), a seed-distribution program to promote home-grown food, and a hostel for women in Trissur, Kerala.

=== Care Homes for Children ===
MAM runs two care homes for children. Amrita Niketan is a facility for 500 children in Paripally, Kollam, Kerala. The majority of Amrita Niketan residents are from poor tribal communities. In 2009, through a sister organization known as Amma-Kenya, MAM started an orphanage in Nairobi for 108 children.

=== Education for Everyone ===
MAM has founded and manages a wide range of educational institutions for the underprivileged and disadvantaged sections of society. These include Amrita Speech & Hearing Improvement School (ASHIS) in Trissur, Kerala; the Amrita Institute for the Differently Abled (AIDA) in Kozhikode, Kerala; adult education classes in Idukki, Kerala, and in Sivakasi, Tamil Nadu; and the Industrial Training Center (ITC) in Karungappally, Kerala. MAM also has runs schools for tribal children in Attappadi and Idukki, Kerala.

Furthermore, MAM is providing 32,000 scholarships to disadvantaged children, many of whom have lost a parent due to suicide or have a parent suffering from AIDS. Known as Vidyamritam, the scholarship program is currently running in Maharashtra, Andhra Pradesh, Karnataka and Kerala. It was originally started as part of MAM's campaign to curb India's problem of farmer suicide, by providing children of agricultural families a means to education that will expand their vocational options. It is MAM's stated goal to eventually provide 100,000 such scholarships throughout India.

Through Amma-Kenya, MAM runs the Amrita Vocational Training Center in Kenya, equipped with 35 computers.

=== Research for a Better World ===
Through MAM's university, Amrita Vishwa Vidyapeetham, volunteer researchers are conducting research and development in disciplines including nanotechnology, biotechnology, robotics and satellite-enabled software solutions. The stated goal behind the research is: "To harness the power of modern technology to provide effect, targeted aid to communities and individuals in crisis." Projects include a sensor network system for landslide detection, a high-quality low-cost insulin pump for diabetics, a system for early-cancer detection and stem-cell research.

Sakshat Amrita Vocational Education (SAVE) is a program funded by the Government of India's e-learning program, Sakshat. SAVE's goal is to provide vocational training to remote and impoverished areas through haptic devices. The Department of Biomedical Informatics at SUNY-Buffalo and Arizona State University are collaborating on the project.

Amrita Virtual Interactive E-learning World (AVIEW) is project developed by MAM researchers. AVIEW allows a teacher at one location to connect with students at another place, using Internet and satellite connectivity. Lectures are recorded and can be viewed later. AVIEW was inaugurated by the former President of India Dr. A.P.J. Abdul Kalam in 2009.

=== Healthcare ===
In 1998, MAM opened the Amrita Institute of Medical Sciences and Research Centre (AIMS) in Cochin, Kerala. Most of AIMS' patients receive subsidized care. The hospital has 1,300 beds and an attached medical college with a 400-bed facility, as well as a 210-bed Intensive Care Facility. Since 1998, AIMS and MAM's other charitable medical institutions have treated more than 5.5 million patients.

AIMS has an extensive pain and palliative home-care program, telemedicine facilities and conducts medical camps in remote areas. MAM also runs four other charitable hospitals, including three in Kerala (one in Kalpetta, one in Pampa and one in Amritapuri) and one in Mysore, Karnataka.

MAM also runs an HIV/AIDS Care Center in Trivandrum, Kerala, the Amrita Kripa Sagar Cancer Hospice in Mumbai and the Amrita Health Center in Port Blair, Andaman Island.

=== Fighting Hunger ===
MAM feeds more than 10 million people every year throughout India, distributing uncooked rice, milk and other staples to remote tribal areas. Outside of India, through sister organizations such as Amma-Europe and the Mata Amritanandamayi Center in the USA, more than 1,000,000 meals to the homeless and hungry are provided annually.

=== Green Initiatives ===
MAM is a member of the United Nations Billion Tree Campaign and has organized the planting of more than one million trees throughout the world since 2001. MAM also has an international environmental organization to promote environmental awareness called GreenFriends. It also runs a Plastic Project that creates shopping bags, purses, sandals and hats, etc., through the weaving recycled plastic. In 2009, in New York, in the presence of Steven Clark Rockefeller, Amma endorsed the Earth Charter, a declaration of fundamental principles for building a sustainable and peaceful world.

=== Public health ===
MAM started the Amala Bharatam Campaign (ABC) in 2010 in order to improve public health and restore India's physical beauty. Through ABC, MAM volunteers clean public areas, construct public toilets and spread awareness regarding environmentally friendly ways of disposing of trash.

== Amrita Institutions ==
MAM runs a number of other institutions. On the educational front, there is the Amrita Vishwa Vidyapeetham, a seven-campus, multi-disciplinary university and more than 90 Amrita Vidyalayam value-based CBSE high schools across India.

Amritapuri Ashram, MAM's headquarters in Kollam District, Kerala, is a spiritual center and international pilgrimage site, where free classes on Vedanta, Sanskrit, meditation and yoga are held. MAM has built and consecrated 20 Brahmasthanam Temples throughout India, and has hundreds of branch centers throughout the country as well. Amrita Kutambam, or Amrita Families, are community groups who come together for the purpose of group prayer and spiritual company.

MAM also publishes dozens of spiritual books and two magazines in various languages.

== Death of Satnam Singh Mann ==
Satnam Singh Mann

Satnam Singh Mann (Hindi: सतनाम सिंह मान) was a law student who was taken into custody for creating disturbances at the Mata Amritanandamayi Ashram (Kollam) on 1 August 2012. He died of alleged torture on 4 August 2012 in custody. At the time of his death, he was a student of Dr. Ram Manohar Lohia National Law University, Lucknow. Mann's relatives stated that they would approach NHRC for justice. For five years prior to his death, he had been undergoing treatment at Bihar Institute of Mental Health at Bhojpur for paranoid schizophrenia. A press release by Matha Amritanandamayi Math had also demanded a probe into the alleged attempt to murder Mata Amritanandamayi.

=== Death ===
On 1 August 2012, he attempted to barge onto the podium of Amritanandamayi at her ashram in Kollam. He was unarmed. According to police, he was screaming and reciting words in Arabic. He attacked security guards and then was overpowered by devotees, who handed him over to the police. He was later taken to Government Mental Hospital, Peroorkada as he was showing signs of mental instability.

The superintendent of the mental hospital stated that there were no injuries on Mann's body when he was brought to the hospital. After being admitted to a mental asylum, Mann was attacked and was physically tortured. He died as a result of the injuries sustained in this attack. He was taken to the Medical College Hospital, Thiruvananthapuram, but was declared dead on arrival. During autopsy, 77 injuries were documented on his body. He was only two weeks short of his 24th birthday when he died.

=== Investigation ===
Kerala Police ordered a Crime Branch probe into the death of Mr. Mann. The special investigation team concluded that the warder and an attendant had attacked Mr. Mann. Four inmates of the mental asylum had joined the two. As per the report, Satnam was beaten with a cable wire and his head was smashed against the wall. Vivekanandan (jail warder) and Anil Kumar (attendant) were arrested in this regard. In the report to the high court, the SIT revealed that the cause of death was injuries sustained to head and neck. The incident was termed a 'custodial murder'.

Mann's relatives later demanded independent probe in to the matter by CBI. This demand was conveyed to the Chief Minister of Kerala, Mr. Oommen Chandi. The Chairman of National Human Rights Commission, Justice K.G. Balakrishnan opined that the death was suspicious.

=== Aftermath ===
On 3 April 2014 the high Court of Kerala considered the petition submitted by Harmindar Kumar singh, father of Satnam Signh Mann, seeking for CBI probe into the death of his son. During the course of hearing, Public Prosecutor admitted before the court that there were some 'omissions' in the investigation. The High court demanded police to file a statement on this issue. The case was to be considered again on 8 April 2014. Meanwhile, CBI have informed the court that it is not willing to take over investigation of the case.

== Awards ==
On February 19, 2010, the President of India Pratibha Patil bestowed the Dharma Khadgam Award to MAM in recognition of its charitable activities. MAM's president, Mata Amritanandamayi Devi, has received numerous awards for her role as the founder, inspiration and manager of MAM's charitable activities.
