= Coimbatore Suburban Railway =

Planned railway in Tamil Nadu, India

Coimbatore Broad Gauge Metro & Suburban Railway

Overview
- Other name: Kovai suburban rail
- Status: Planned
- Owner: Indian Railways
- Locale: Coimbatore, Tamil Nadu
- Termini: Coimbatore Junction
- Connecting lines: Mettupalayam line, Pollachi line, Palakkad line, Tiruppur line, Kovai circular line

Service
- Type: suburban rail
- Services: 5 routes
- Operator: Southern Railway
- Depot: Coimbatore

Technical
- Number of tracks: Single, Double
- Track gauge: 5 ft 6 in (1,676 mm) broad gauge
- Old gauge: Metre gauge
- Electrification: 25 kV, 50 Hz AC through overhead catenary
- Operating speed: 110 Kmph
- Signalling: Railway Signalling
Route map
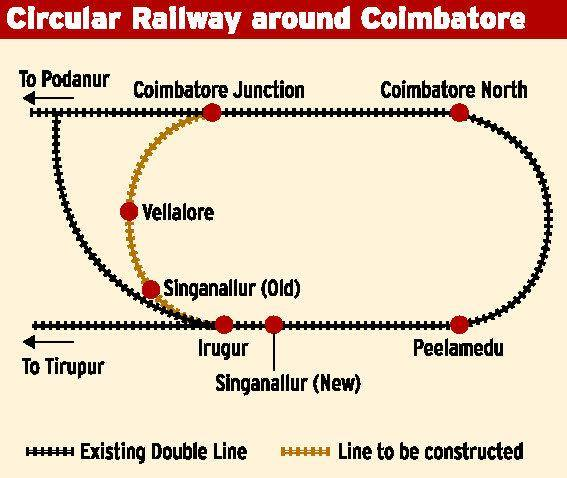

Coimbatore suburban is an urban transit planned for Coimbatore city.. Restoration of old Main Line (Which was Broad Gauge Vellore Station) Nanjundapuram Railway link line lengths 1 km will help plan circular urban electric train track. A senior official with the Salem division says, "if the revival of an old line can bring about so many benefits, it can be considered". However, Implementation of this project gets delayed due to the Proposed Coimbatore Metro.

== Routes ==
These are the 5 routes.

1. Coimbatore Jn – Mettupalayam
2. Coimbatore Jn. – Pollachi Jn.
3. Coimbatore Jn – Tiruppur
4. Coimbatore Jn – Palakkad Jn
5. Coimbatore Jn – Irugur Jn – Podanur In – Coimbatore Jn (Proposed for Both Metro and Mainline Routes)(circular line as well as urban line).

Local passenger trains from Coimbatore Junction is operating on all the above-mentioned sub urban routes except the Coimbatore Jn – Irugur Jn – Coimbatore Jn (circular line as well as urban line).

== Suburban stations ==
The other stations serving Coimbatore include Coimbatore North Junction (CBF), Podanur Junction (PTJ), Irugur Junction (IGU), Madukkarai (MDKI), Pilamedu (PLMD), Singanallur (SHI), Sulur Road (SUU), Periyanaickenpalayam railway station (PKU) and Somanur (SNO). Other stations like Chettipalayam, Urumandampalayam, Veerapandi and Pudupalayam are defunct. The people have asked to reopen the stations., The 1 km long Nanjundapuram Railway link line became completely defunct and was dismantled soon after the Coimbatore North – Irugur line was put to use.

Restoration of this Nanjundapuram Railway link line will help plan circular suburban electric train track connecting major train stations in the outskirts of Coimbatore like Mettupalayam, Irugur, Podanur, Pollachi etc. to ease growing peripheral traffic. Reopening this defunct Nanjundapuram Railway line & Station can benefit residents from Nanjundapuram, Ramanathapuram, Redfields, Puliakulam, Sowripalayam, Udayampalayam, Singanallur, Varadarajapuram, Uppilipalayam and Ondipudur areas of Coimbatore for train connections to onward destinations. Irugur via Nanjundapuram: This bye-pass connection from Irugur – Podanur line to Coimbatore bypassing Podanur had been laid long back at a time when Coimbatore was connected only from Podanur as a branch from Irugur–Podanur–Shoranur line. It was done to facilitate trains from Erode side to directly go to Coimbatore. However, this connection became superfluous when Coimbatore was directly connected from Irugur side via Pilamedu and Coimbatore North in 1953, and accordingly, this link line was removed at that time. Since the doubling work between Irugur–Coimbatore section is in progress, these double lines will be utilised for suburban traffic if required.

== List of railway stations ==
List of railway stations in Coimbatore
No	Name	Native Name	Station Code
1	Coimbatore Junction	கோயம்புத்தூர் சந்திப்பு	CBE
2	Podanur Junction	போத்தனூர் சந்திப்பு	PTJ
3	Coimbatore North Junction	கோயம்புத்தூர் வடக்கு சந்திப்பு	CBF
4	Pilamedu	பீளமேடு	PLMD
5	Singanallur	சிங்காநல்லூர்	SHI
6	Irugur Junction	இருகூர் சந்திப்பு	IGU
7	Periyanaickenpalayam	பெரியநாயக்கன்பாளையம்	PKM
8	Madukkarai	மதுக்கரை	MDKI
9	Somanur	சோமனூர்	SNO
10	Sulur Road	சூலூர் ரோடு	SUU
11	Thudiyalur	துடியலூர்	TDE
12	Karamadai	காரமடை	KAY
13	Ettimadai	எட்டிமடை	ETMD
14	Kinathukadavu	கிணத்துக்கடவு	CNV
15	Pollachi Junction	பொள்ளாச்சி	POY
16	Anaimalai Road	ஆனைமலை	ANM
17	Gomangalam	கோமங்கலம்	GMGM
18	Kallar	கல்லார்	QLR
19	Mettupalayam	மேட்டுப்பாளையம்	MTP
20	Adderley	அடர்லி	ADY
21	Minatchipuram	மீனாட்சிபுரம்	MXM

Coimbatore Broad Gauge Metro (Circular Suburban) Railway{\

== List of closed railway stations ==
List of Defunct and closed railway stations in Coimbatore
No.	Name
1	Chettipalayam (CIM)
2	Urumandampalayam (URP)
3	Veerapandi (VRPT)
4	Pudupalayam
5	Nallatipalayam (NLPM)
6	Kovilpalayam (CVM)
7	Pulankinar (PLKR)
8	Tippampatti (TPMP)
9	Kallar (QLR/)
10	Tamaraikulam
11	Kurumbapalayam (KMBP)
12	Vellalore Road
13	Old Singanallur(SHI)
14	Nallampalayam/Koundempalayam/Goundampalayam
15	NarasimhaNaikenPALAYAM HALT
16	Ondipudur HALT
17	ADRL/Adderley (ADY-NMR)
