= List of railway stations in Coimbatore =

Railway station in Tamil Nadu, India

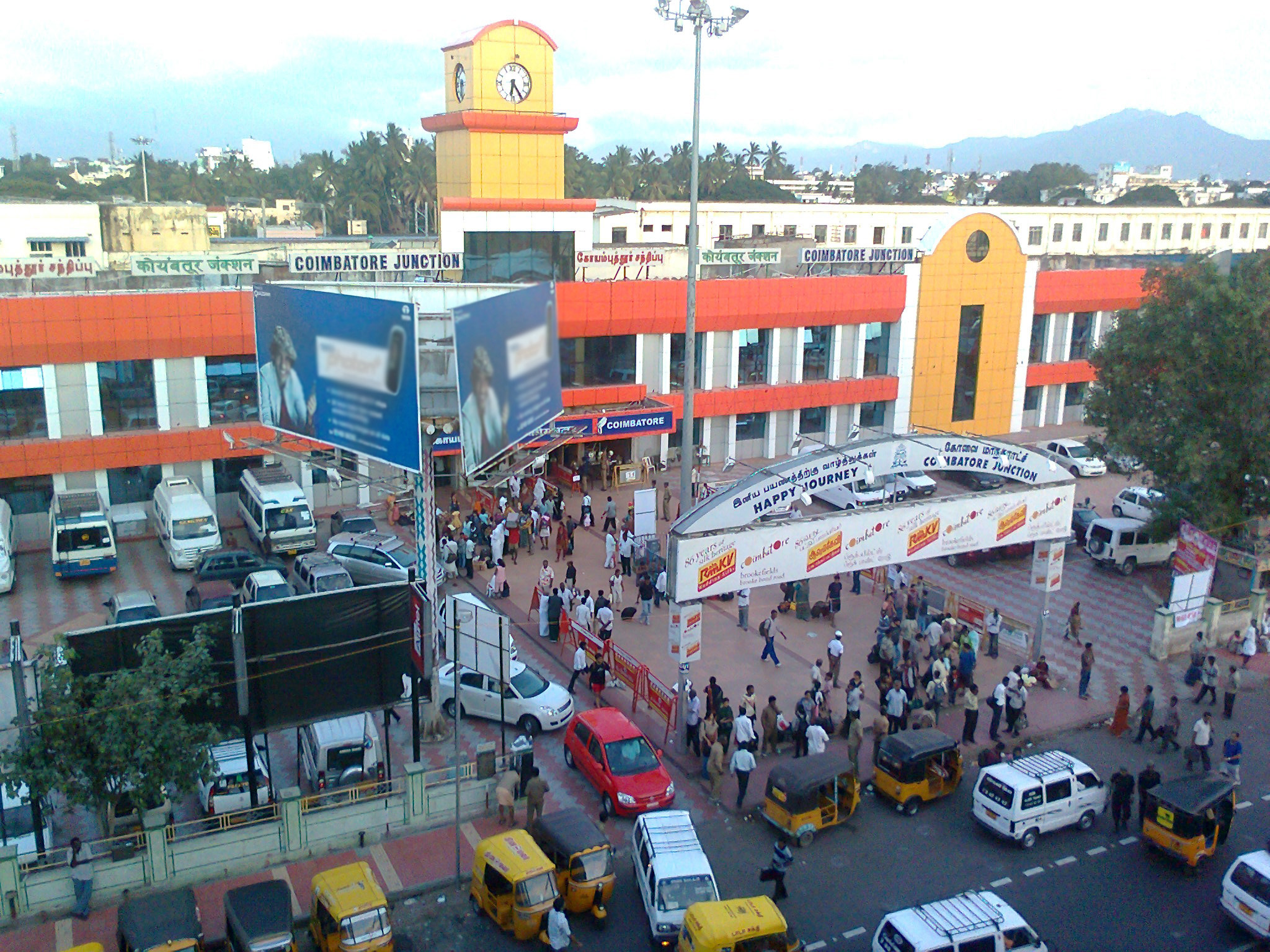
Coimbatore Main

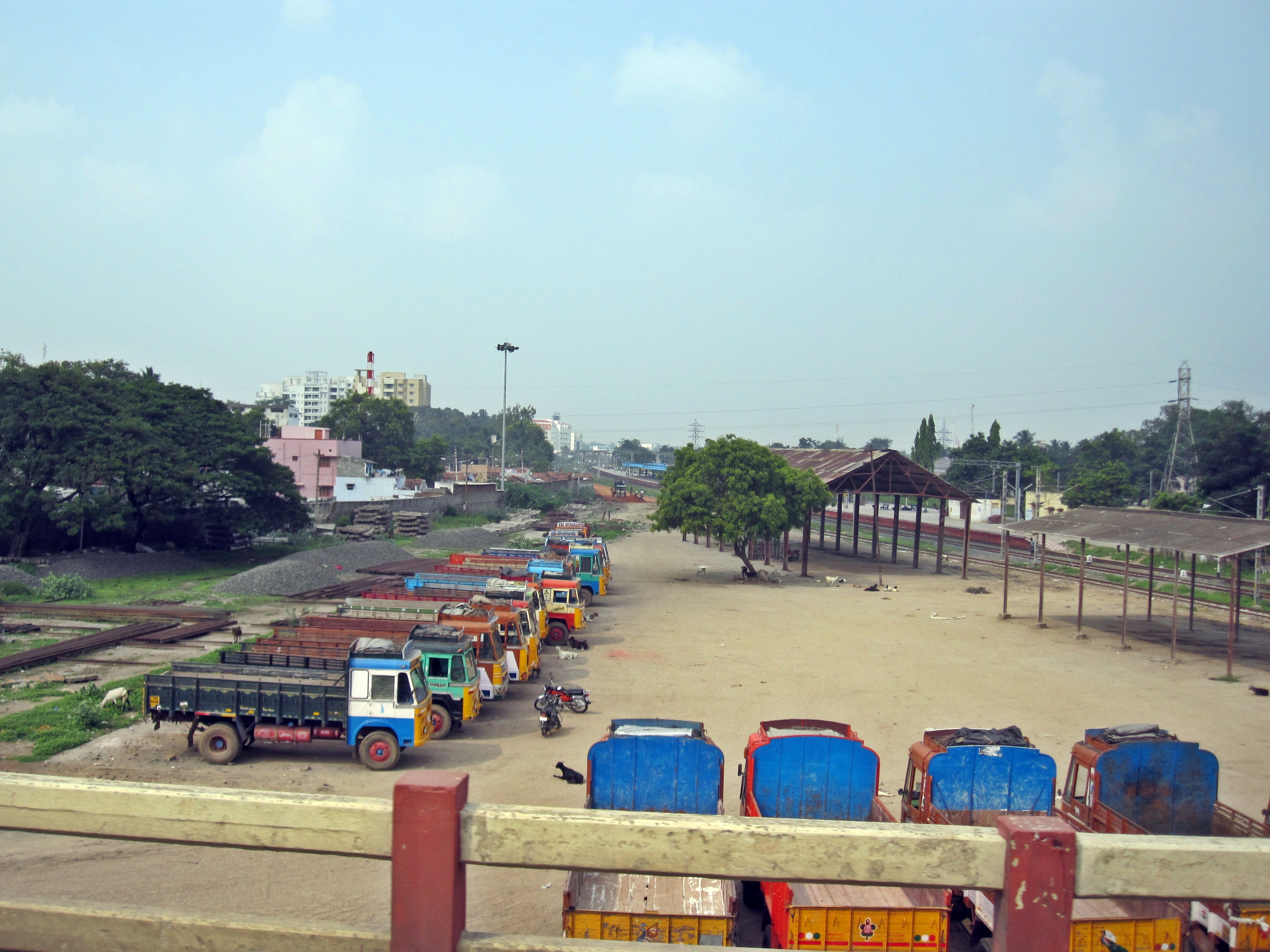
Coimbatore North

Coimbatore or Kovai is a major city in the Indian state of Tamil Nadu. It is the second largest city and urban agglomeration in the state after Chennai and the sixteenth largest urban agglomeration in India. It is administered by the Coimbatore Municipal Corporation and is the administrative capital of Coimbatore district. It is one of the fastest growing tier-II cities in India and a major textile, industrial, commercial, educational, information technology, healthcare and manufacturing hub of Tamil Nadu. It is often referred to as the "Manchester of South India" due to its cotton production and textile industries.

Train service in Coimbatore started in 1861, upon construction of the Podanur–Madras line connecting Kerala and the west coast with the rest of India. Coimbatore lies on the Coimbatore–Shoranur 5 ft 6 in (1,676 mm) broad gauge railway line. Until 1956, the Coimbatore railway division was functioning with Podanur as its Headquarters. In 1956, the headquarters was shifted to Olavakkode, of Kerala, and was named Olavakkod railway division. In 1980, Olavakkod division was renamed Palakkad railway division. It comprised Kerala and western districts of Tamil Nadu. Ultimately, a new Salem railway division was carved out of the Palakkad railway division in 2006 with Salem as its headquarters. The city falls under the Salem Division of the Southern Railway zone of Indian Railways. The major railway station is the Coimbatore Junction which is the second largest income generating station in the Southern Railway zone after Chennai Central and is amongst the top hundred booking stations of Indian Railways. Other major railway stations catering to the city include Coimbatore North Junction, Podanur Junction and minor stations at Peelamedu, Singanallur, Irugur Junction, Perianaikanpalayam, Madukkarai, Somanur, Sulur & Thudiyalur.

== List of railway stations ==
List of railway stations in Coimbatore
Name	Native name	Station code
Coimbatore Junction	கோயம்புத்தூர் சந்திப்பு	CBE
Podanur Junction	போத்தனூர் சந்திப்பு	PTJ
Coimbatore North Junction	கோயம்புத்தூர் வடக்கு சந்திப்பு	CBF
Pilamedu	பீளமேடு	PLMD
Singanallur	சிங்காநல்லூர்	SHI
Irugur Junction	இருகூர் சந்திப்பு	IGU
Periyanaickenpalayam	பெரியநாயக்கன்பாளையம்	PKM
Madukkarai	மதுக்கரை	MDKI
Somanur	சோமனூர்	SNO
Sulur Road	சூலூர் ரோடு	SUU
Thudiyalur	துடியலூர்	TDE
Karamadai	காரமடை	KAY
Kinathukadavu	கிணத்துக்கடவு	CNV
Ettimadai	எட்டிமடை	ETMD

List of Defunct railway stations in Coimbatore
Name	Native name	Status	Station code
Chettipalayam	செட்டிபாளையம்	Defunct	CIM
Urumandampalayam	உருமாண்டம்பாளையம்	closed	
Veerapandi	வீரபாண்டி	closed	
Pudupalayam	புதுப்பாளையம்	closed	
Nallatipalayam	நல்லட்டிபாளையம்	closed	
Koilpalayam	கோயில்பாளையம்	closed	
Tamaraikulam	தாமரைக்குளம்	closed	
Nanjundapuram	நஞ்சுண்டாபுரம்	closed	

== Metrorail ==
Three metrorail routes have been proposed. Two circular routes, in the northern and southern parts of the city and a dual linear line connecting the Eastern and Western parts. The Northern Route starts from Gandhipuram via Ganapathy, Sivanandha colony, Saibaba colony, RS Puram, Townhall, City railway station and ends in Gandhipuram. The second circular route starts from Podanur Junction via Trichy Road, Sungam, Redfields, Race Course, City railway station, Ukkadam and ends at Podanur. A linear line was also proposed from Chinniampalayam, Coimbatore International Airport, CODISSIA, PSG Tech, Lakshmi Mills, Gandhipuram, Coimbatore North Junction, Cowley Brown Road and TNAU. Recently Vadavalli and Thondamuthur are the two new areas that has been included in the linear line as part of the phase extension. In 2017, Tamil Nadu government announced that CMRL would prepare DPR and feasibility report for Coimbatore metro rail project and will be funded by German-based company.

== Coimbatore suburban circular railway ==
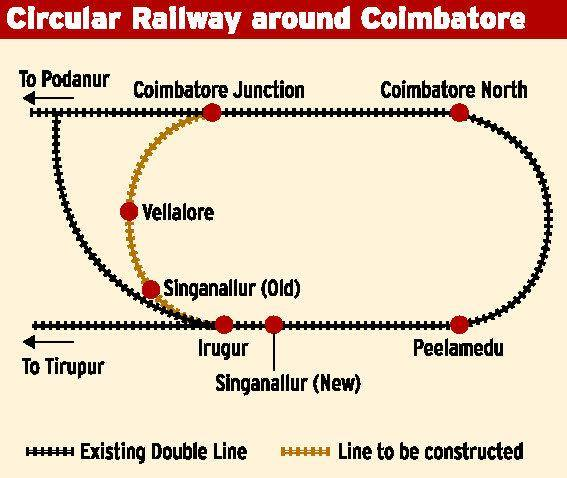

Coimbatore suburban circular railway is a circular suburban railway planned for Coimbatore city. The circular railway line will help run through Coimbatore Junction, Podanur, Vellalore, Irugur, Singanallur, Peelamedu and Coimbatore North (see map). This will certainly help decongest the city roads. A senior official with the Salem division says if the revival of an old line can bring about so many benefits, it can be considered.
