= Kinathukadavu (disambiguation) =

Kinathukadavu, is a town panchayat suburb of Coimbatore city and taluk in Coimbatore district.

Kinathukadavu may also refer to:

- Kinathukadavu (state assembly constituency)
- Kinathukadavu Block
- Kinathukadavu railway station
- Kinathukadavu taluk
