= Singanallur, Coimbatore (disambiguation) =

Singanallur, Coimbatore, is a major residential neighbourhood in the eastern part of Coimbatore city.

Singanallur may also refer to:

- Singanallur (state assembly constituency)
- Singanallur Bus Terminus
- Singanallur railway station
- Singanallur Lake
