= Muthukkavuntanore =

Muthukkavuntanore (also spelt as Muthukavundanur or Muthugoundanur) is a small village in the Kinathukadavu block of Kinathukadavu taluk, in Tamil Nadu.

== Occupation ==
The main occupation is farming. Coconut, Tomato and other vegetables is the major part of farming.

== Temples ==
Muthumalai Murugan temple. More about the temple can be found

== Climate ==
As this village lies along the Palghat pass, the climate is fine throughout the year.
