= Chettiyakkapalayam =

- Rural
- Location in Tamil Nadu, India Chettiyakkapalayam (India)
- Coordinates: 10.819438°N 77.018323°E
- Country: India
- State: Tamil Nadu
- District: Coimbatore

Languages
  - Official: Tamil
- Time zone: UTC+5:30 (IST)
- Postal code: 641***
- Telephone code: +91-422
- Vehicle registration: TN 38

Chettiyakkapalayam is a village in Kinathukadavu Taluk in the Coimbatore district in the Indian state of Tamil Nadu.

== Education ==
=== Engineering College ===
- Arjun College of Technology

== Transport ==
Buses from Kinathukadavu To Periya Negamam
