= Halasal =

- Village
- Country: India
- State: Karnataka
- District: Belgaum
- Talukas: Khanapur

Languages
  - Official: Kannada
- Time zone: UTC+5:30 (IST)

Halasal is a village in Belgaum district in the southern state of Karnataka.

Halasal is a natural habitat for wildlife, including tigers, leopards, black panthers, elephants, gaur, deer, antelopes, and bears. Birds include the Indian spot-billed duck, pond heron, little egret, white-throated kingfisher, red-wattled lapwing, black-winged stilt, grey heron, eagle, bulbul, and wagtail. Some people visit Halasal to take part in jungle safaris.

Antarali Dagad or the "magic stone", a large stone resting on a small area, is a well-known tourist spot and popular for picnics.
