= List of birds of Singanallur Lake =

This is a list of the birds found at Singanallur Lake in Coimbatore in the Indian state of Tamil Nadu. Over 100 species of birds have been spotted in the lake. The list includes the name in Tamil.

== Non-passerines ==
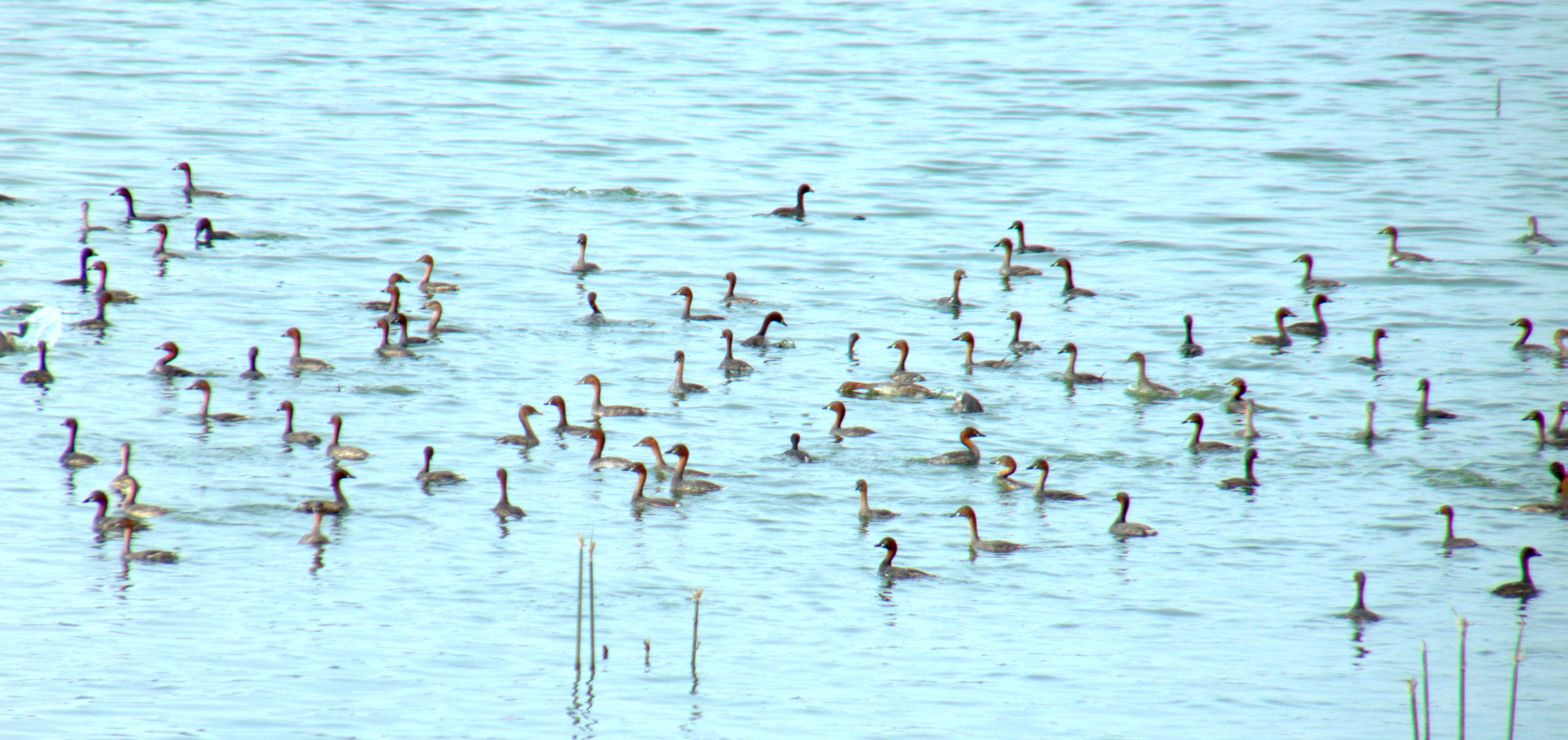
Little grebes in Singanallur Lake

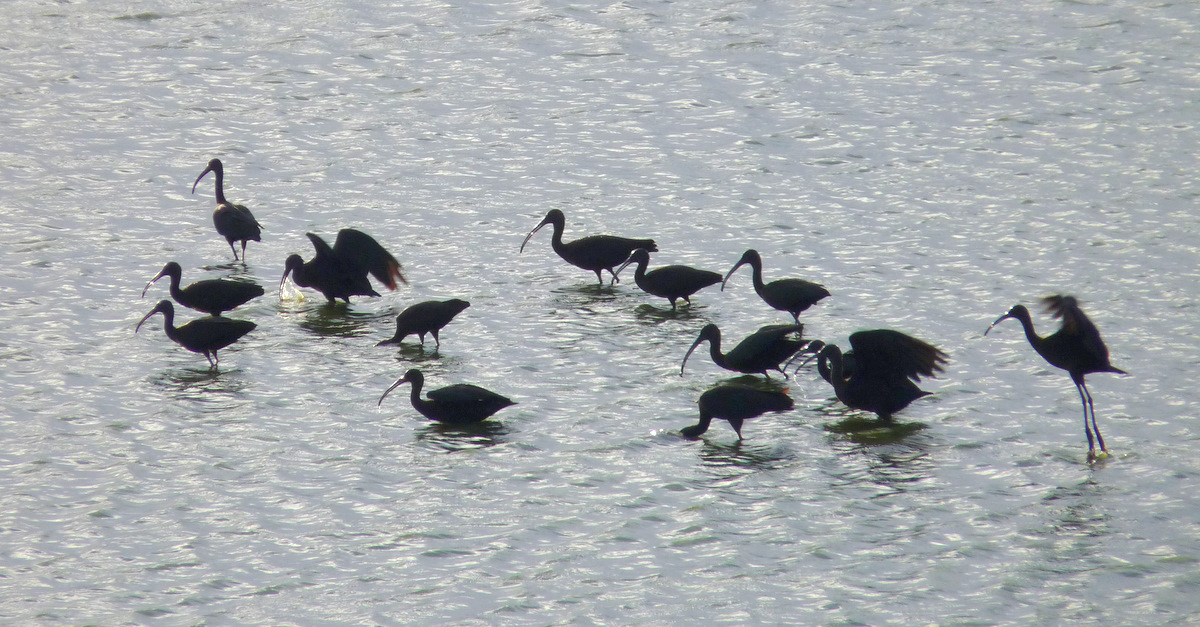
Glossy ibises in Singanallur Lake

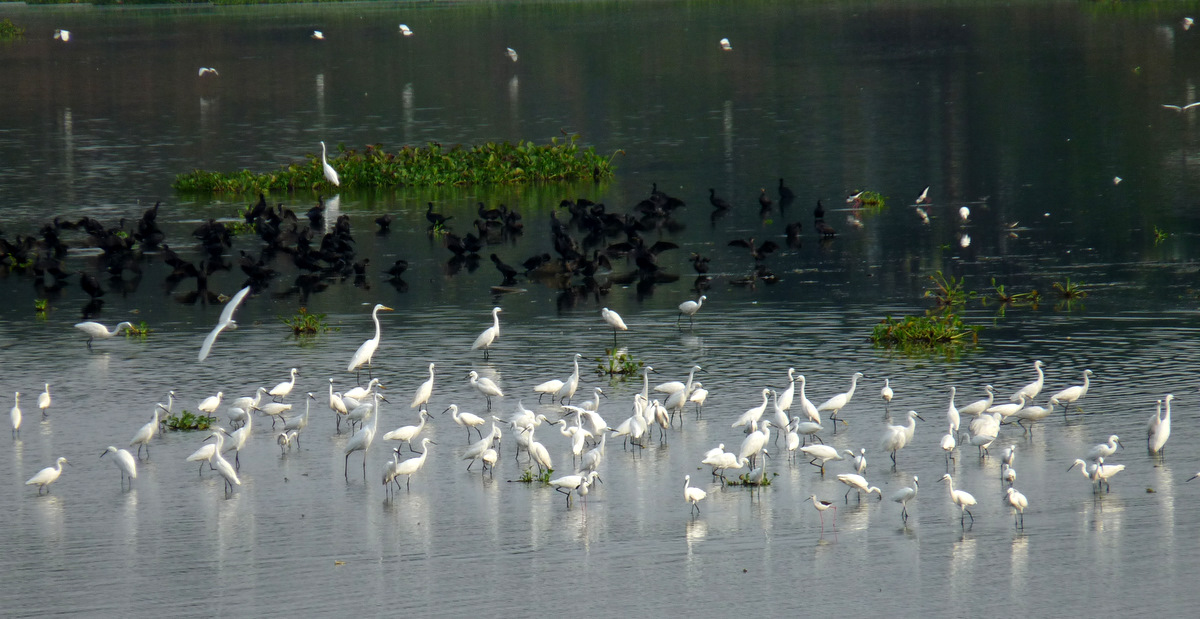
Cormorant and egrets in Singanallur Lake

=== Cormorants ===
- Little cormorant, chinna neer kagam
- Indian cormorant, kondai neer kagam
- Great cormorant, peria neer kagam

=== Herons and egrets ===
- Little egret, chinna kokku
- Purple heron, sen narai
- Grey heron, sambal narai
- Great egret, peria kokku
- Intermediate egret, naduthara kokku
- Cattle egret, unni kokku
- Indian pond heron, kuruttu kokku
- Black-crowned night heron, erakokku
- Western reef egret

=== Storks ===
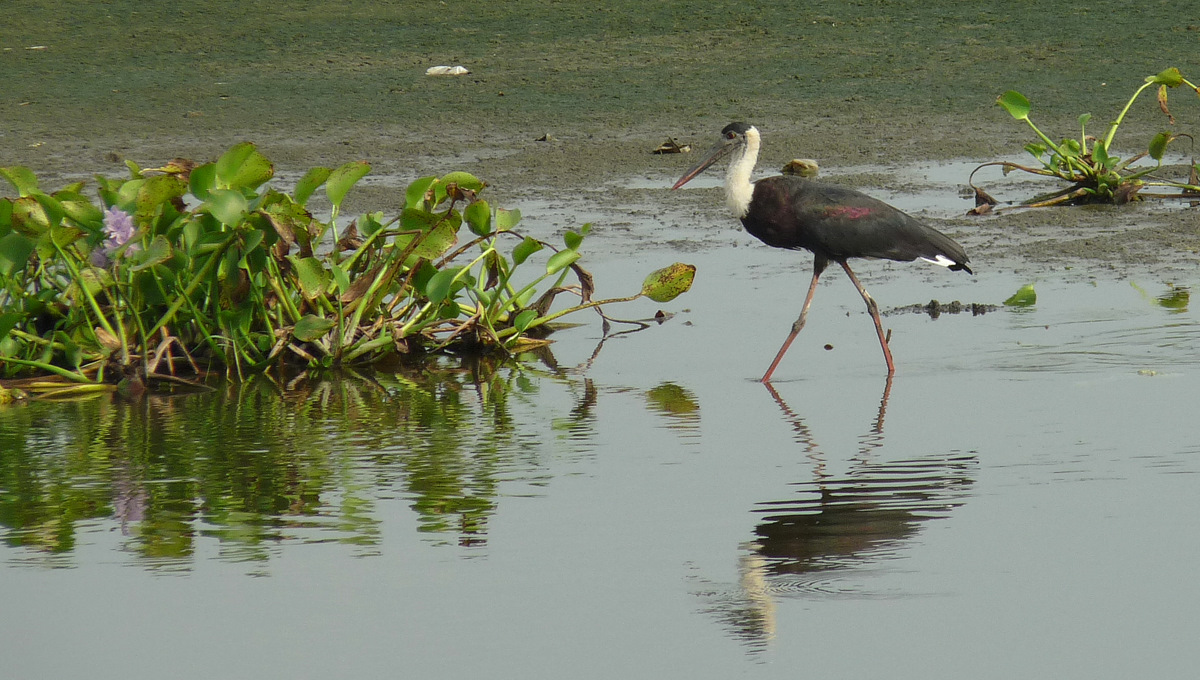
Woolly-necked stork in Singanallur Lake

- Painted stork, manjal mooku narai
- Woolly-necked stork, sengaal narai

=== Ibis and spoonbill ===
- Glossy ibis, arival mookkan
- Black-headed ibis, vellai arival mookkan
- Eurasian spoonbill, karandivayan

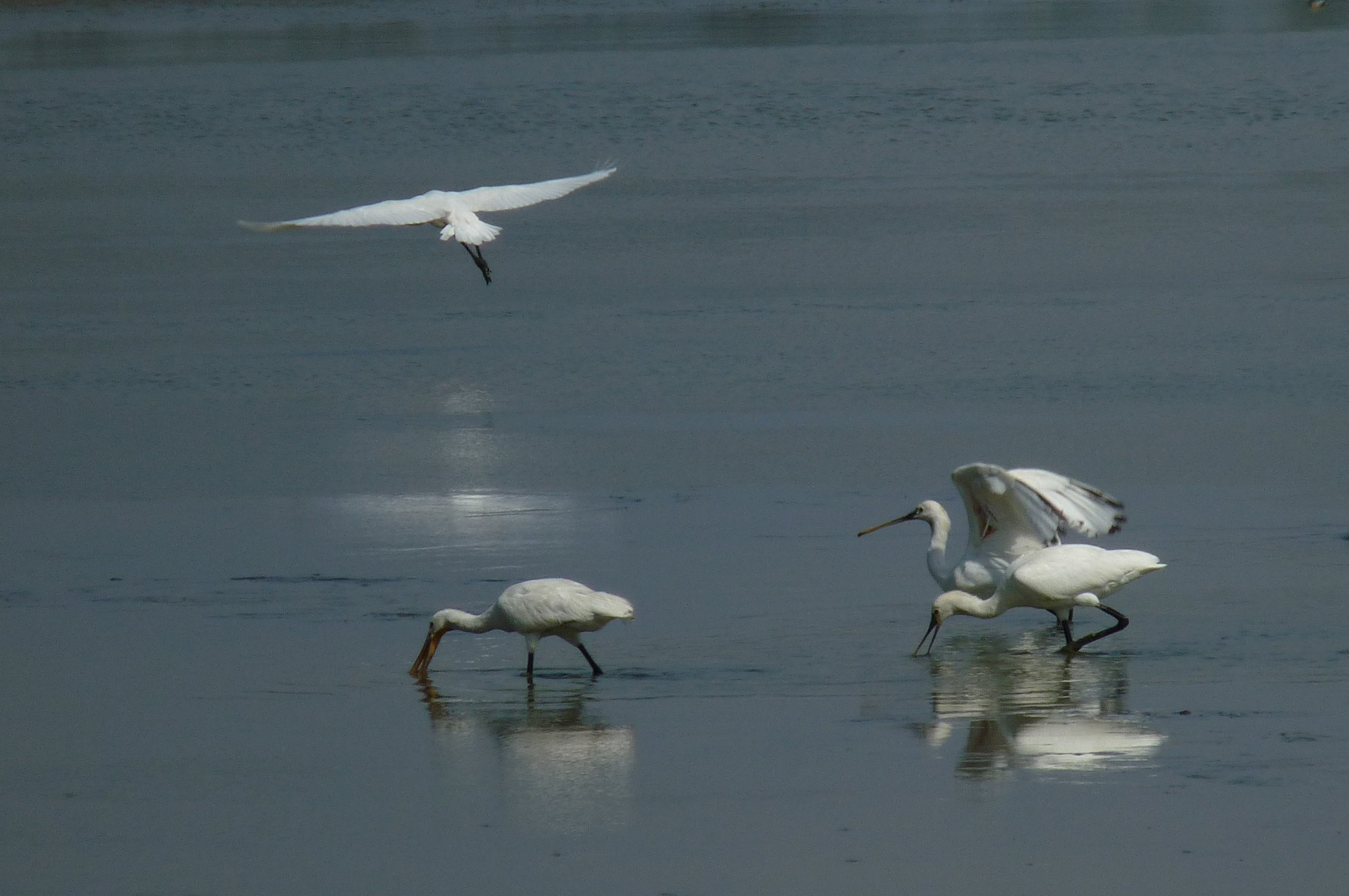
Eurasian spoonbill at Singanallur Lake, Coimbatore

=== Kites and harriers ===
- Black kite, kalla parundhu
- Brahminy kite, semparundhu
- Western marsh harrier, setru poonai parundhu
- Pallid harrier, poonai parundhu
- Pied harrier, vellai poonai parundhu
- Shikra, valluru

=== Ducks ===
- Gadwall, karuval vathu
- Indian spot-billed duck, pulli mookku vathu
- Northern shoveler, andi vathu
- Garganey, neela chiragi
- Eurasian teal, kiluvai

=== Francolin and fowl ===
- Grey francolin, kowdhari
- Indian peafowl, neela mayil

=== Crakes and rail ===
- White-breasted waterhen, kambul kozhi
- Little crake, chinna kaanan kozhi
- Ruddy-breasted crake, sivappu kaanaan kozhi
- Water cock, thanneer kozhi
- Grey-headed swamphen, neela thazhai kozhi
- Common moorhen, thaazhai kozhi
- Common coot, naamak kozhi

=== Jacanas ===
- Pheasant-tailed jacana, neela vaal ilai kozhi

=== Plovers and lapwings ===
- Little ringed plover, pattani uppukkothi
- Yellow-wattled lapwing, sivappu mookku aalkatti
- Red-wattled lapwing

=== Godwit, sandpipers and stilt ===
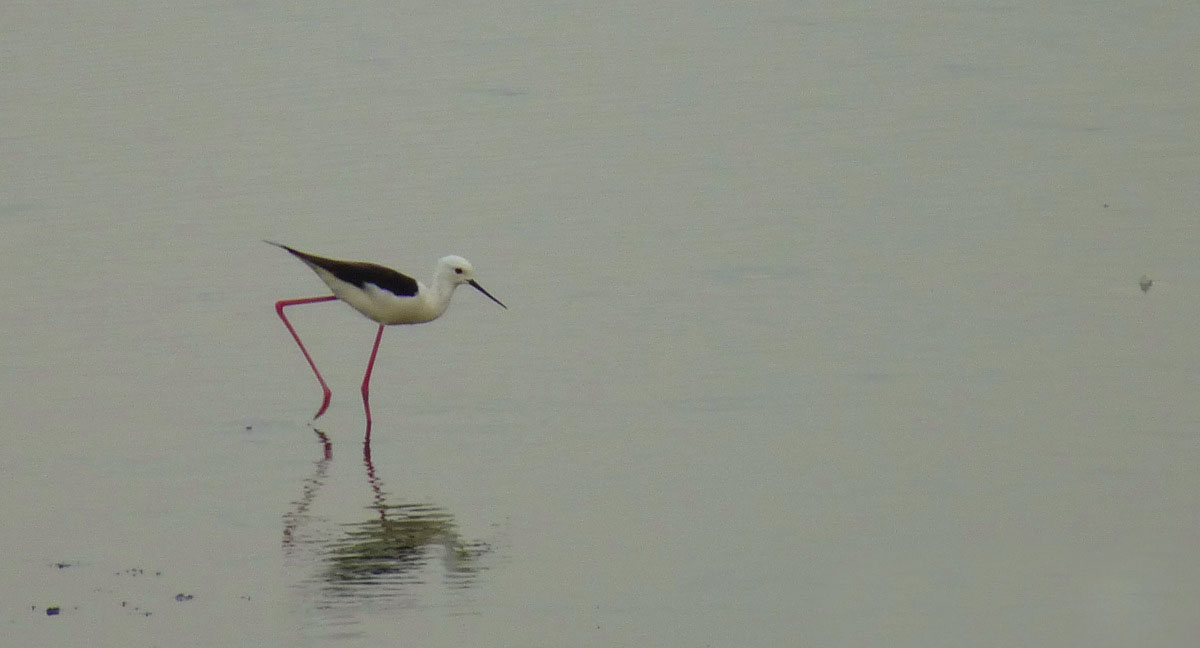
Black-winged stilt in Singanallur Lake

- Black-tailed godwit, karuvaal mukkan
- Marsh sandpiper, chinna pachai kaali
- Wood sandpiper, pori ullan
- Common sandpiper, ullan
- Black-winged stilt, nedungaal ullan

=== Terns ===
- Common tern, aala
- Black-bellied tern, karuppu vayitru aala

=== Doves and pigeons ===
- Rock dove, mada pura
- Laughing dove, chinna thavittu pura
- Spotted dove, pulli pura

=== Parakeet ===
- Rose-ringed parakeet, senthaar pynkili

=== Cuckoos ===
- Jacobin cuckoo, sudalai kuyil
- Asian koel, kokilam
- Greater coucal, shenbagam

=== Owls ===
- Spotted owlet, pulli aandhai

=== Swifts ===
- Asian palm swift, panai uzhavaran
- House swift, nattu uzhavaran

=== Kingfishers ===
- Common kingfisher, siraal meenkothi
- Stork-billed kingfisher, peria alagu meenkothi
- White-breasted kingfisher, venmaarbu meenkothi
- Pied kingfisher, karuppu vellai meenkothi

=== Bee-eaters ===
- Green bee-eater, pachai panchuruttan
- Blue-tailed bee-eater, neelawal panchuruttan
- Chestnut-headed bee-eater, chenthalai panchuruttan

=== Rollers and hoopoe ===
- Indian roller, panangadai
- Hoopoe, kondalathi

=== Barbets ===
- Coppersmith barbet, chemmarbu kukkuruvaan

=== Woodpeckers ===
- Lesser golden-backed woodpecker, ponmudhugu maram kothi

=== Other non-passerines ===
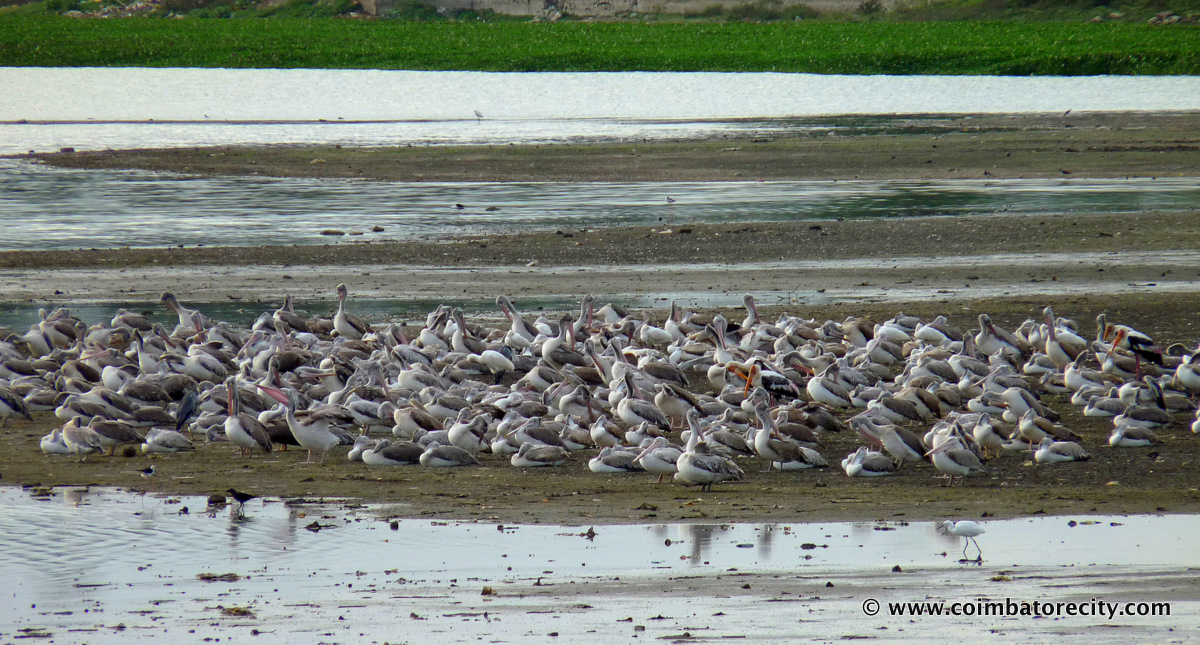
Spot-billed pelicans in Singanallur Lake

- Little grebe, mukkulippan
- Spot-billed pelican, kuzhai kada
- Darter, pambu thara
- Common redshank, pavazha kaali

== Passerines ==
=== Larks ===
- Indian bushlark, sivappu irakkai vaanambadi
- Oriental skylark, chinna vaanambadi

=== Martin and swallows ===
- Barn swallow, thagaivilaan
- Eastern red-rumped swallow, sivappu pitta thagaivilaan

=== Wagtails and pipit ===
- White wagtail, vellai vaalatti
- Large pied wagtail, karuppu vellai vaalatti
- yellow wagtail, manjal vaalatti
- Grey wagtail, karum saambal vaalatti
- Paddyfield pipit, vayal nettai kaali

=== Shrikes and woodshrikes ===
- Brown shrike, pazhuppu keechaan
- Rufous-backed shrike, chemmudhugu keechaan
- Common woodshrike, kattu keechaan

=== Bulbuls ===
- Red-whiskered bulbul, sivappu meesai chinnaan
- Red-vented bulbul, chinnaan

=== Robin and chats ===
- Indian robin, karunchittu
- Siberian stonechat, kalkuruvi
- Pied bushchat, karuppu vellai pudhar chittu

=== Laughingthrushes ===
- Yellow-billed babbler, venthalai silamban

=== Warblers, prinias and tailorbird ===
- Zitting cisticola, karungottu kadhirkuruvi
- Ashy prinia, saambal kadhirkuruvi
- Paddyfield warbler, vayal kadhirkuruvi
- Blyth's reed warbler, blyth naanal kadhirkuruvi
- Clamorous reed warbler, naanal kadhirkuruvi
- Common tailorbird, thaiyal chittu
- Greenish warbler, pachai kadhirkuruvi
- Eastern Orphean warbler, karunthalai kathirkuruvi

=== Flycatchers ===
- Indian paradise flycatcher, arasawal eppidippan

=== Flowerpeckers ===
- Tickell's flowerpecker, tickell malar kothi

=== Sunbirds ===
- Purple-rumped sunbird, oodha pitta thenchittu
- Purple sunbird, oodha thenchittu

=== Munias ===
- White-rumped munia, venmudhugu munia
- Spotted munia, pulli chillai
- Tricoloured munia, karunthalai chillai

=== Sparrows ===
- House sparrow, chittu

=== Weavers ===
- Baya weaver, tookanag kuruvi

=== Starling and myna ===
- Rosy starling, chollakkuruvi
- Common myna, naganavaai

=== Orioles ===
- Indian golden oriole, maangkuil
- Black-headed oriole, karunthalai maangkuil

=== Drongos ===
- Black drongo, karung karichaan

=== Crows and treepies ===
- Indian treepie, vaal kakkai
- House crow, kakkai
- Jungle crow, andam kakkai
