= VNJ =

VNJ can stand for:

- The Varde–Nørre Nebel railway line, Danish: Varde-Nørre Nebel Jernbane
- The Association of German National Jews, German: Verband nationaldeutscher Juden
- VPJ, the Indian Railways station code for Vanjipalayam railway station, Tamil Nadu, India
- The Vlaams Nationaal Jeugdverbond, Flemish National Youth Union, a Flemish youth movement
