= Singanallur Lake =

Lake in India

- Location within Tamil Nadu
- Location: Singanallur, Coimbatore, India
- Coordinates: 10°59′20.59″N 77°1′21.88″E
- Primary inflows: Noyyal River canal
- Basin countries: India
- Surface area: 1.153 km^{2} (0.445 sq mi)
- Average depth: 4.25 m (13.9 ft)
- Water volume: 52,270,000 m^{3} (0.01254 cu mi)
- Shore length^{1}: 3.1 km (1.9 mi)
- Settlements: Coimbatore
- ^{1} Shore length is not a well-defined measure.

Singanallur Lake is a lake in Singanallur, Coimbatore, South India. It is spread over an area of 1.153 km^{2} (0.445 sq mi) and has an average depth of 4.25 m (13.9 ft). It is one of the 9 large lakes in the city.

== Hydrography ==
The lake is fed by canals derived from Noyyal River. The lake also receives water from Sanganur drain and sewage water. The water can be released through two sluice gates on the lake. In 2010, pipes were laid to connecting the lake to Valankulam Lake to drain excess water during floods.

== Flora and fauna ==
Eichornia crassipes is the main aquatic plant species causing eutrophication of the lake. The insect species included four orders Orthoptera, Coleoptera, Hemiptera and Odonata.

The lake supports a rich bio-diversity consisting of plankton, butterflies, resident and migratory birds. Various species of butterflies including common Mormon, joker butterfly, glassy tiger and plain tiger have been spotted in the lake. Over 110 species of birds have been spotted in the lake. The spot-billed pelican, painted stork, openbill stork, ibis, Indian spot-billed duck, teal and black-winged stilt visit the lake during their migration. Various families of birds recorded include cormorants, herons, storks, ibis, kites, ducks, francolin, crakes, jacanas, plovers, sandpipers, terns, doves and pigeons, parakeet, cuckoos, owls, swifts, kingfishers, bee-eaters, rollers, barbets, woodpeckers, larks, swallows, wagtails, shrikes, bulbul, robin, babblers, warblers, flycatchers, flowerpecker, sunbirds, munias, sparrows, weavers, myna, orioles, drongos and crows.

== Fishing ==
Fishing is carried out by local fishermen and enthusiasts. In the 2000s, due to encroachment and the fishes were infected with metals and pathogens from polluted waste water discharged from the sewage.

== Transport ==
A railway track connecting Podanur and Irugur passes over the lake.

== Environmental concerns ==
In 2006, the lake was encroached by water hyacinth and contaminated due to effluents released into the lake. In 2014, Coimbatore Corporation unveiled a plan to clear the encroachments and use the lake for recreation. In January 2015, the lake was cleared and made ready for commercial tourism purposes.

== Recreation ==
Singanallur boat house was opened in 2005 and was closed in 2009 due to poor maintenance. In 2014, after the Coimbatore Corporation plan to de-silt the lake, the boat house was renovated. The Government of Tamil Nadu will introduce water sports and boating on the lake. Despite the increased inflow of tourists since renovation, tourists complain of unavailability of boats.

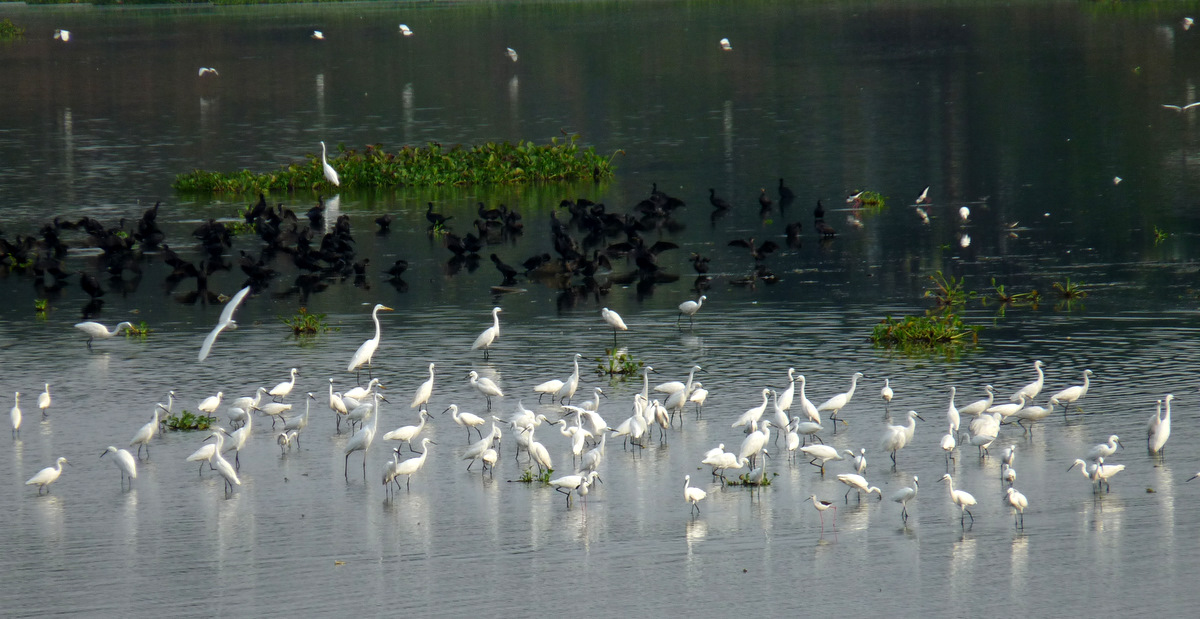
Cormorant and egrets

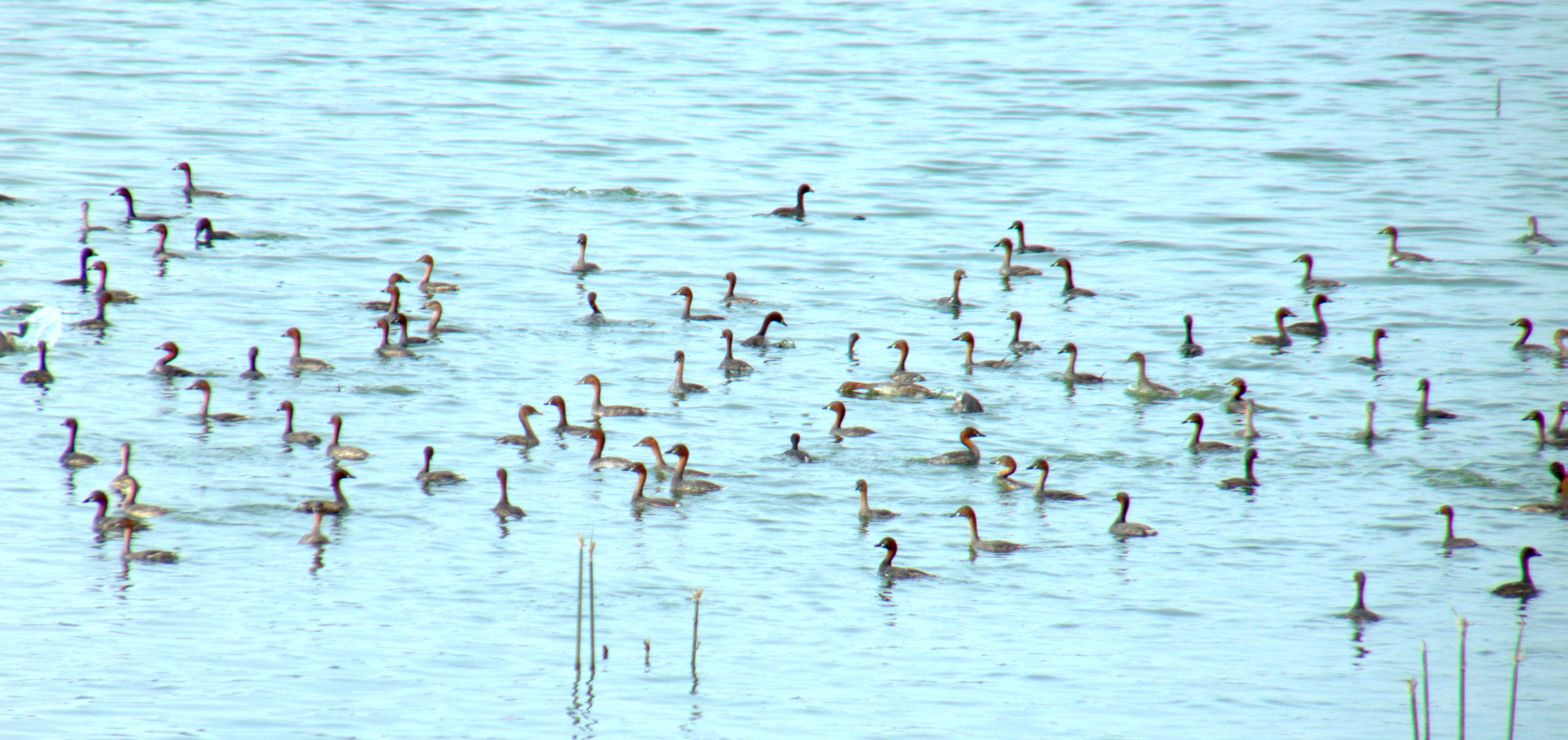
Little grebes

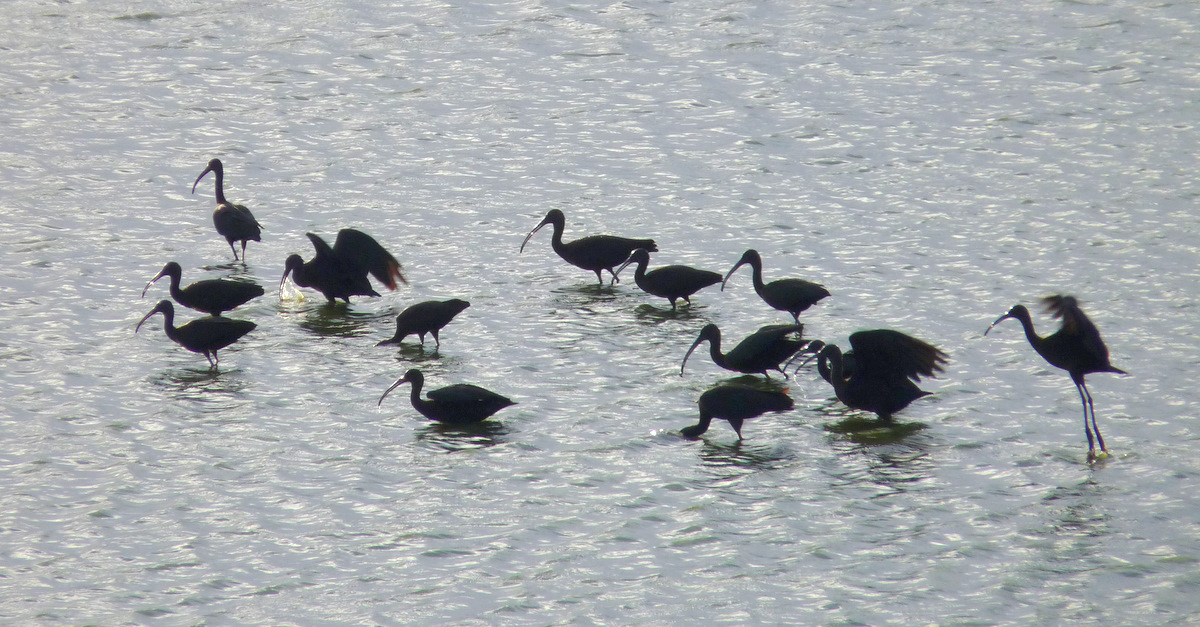
Glossy ibises

== See also ==
- List of birds of Singanallur Lake
