= Ettimadai railway station =

Railway station in Coimbatore district, India

Ettimadai
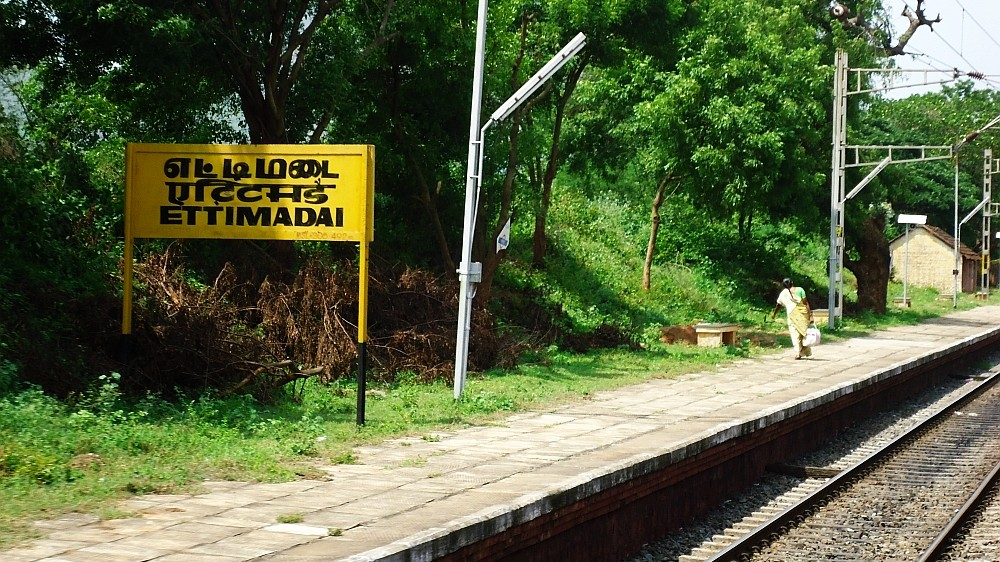

General information
- Location: Near Amrita University, Ettimadai, Coimbatore district, Tamil Nadu; India
- Coordinates: 10.8986°N 76.8962°E
- Elevation: 313 metres (1,027 ft)
- System: Indian Railways station
- Owner: Indian Railways
- Line: Jolarpettai–Shoranur line
- Platforms: 2
- Tracks: 2
- Bus operators: A3 (Gandhipuram to Ettimadai RS)

Construction
- Structure type: On ground

Other information
- Status: Functioning
- Station code: ETMD
- Zone(s): Southern Railway zone
- Division(s): Salem
- Fare zone: Southern Railway zone

History
- Electrified: Double electric line
Location
- Location within Tamil Nadu Location within Kerala Location within India

Ettimadai (station code: ETMD) is an NSG–6 category Indian railway station in Palakkad railway division of Southern Railway zone. It is a railway station in the Coimbatore suburb of Ettimadai, Tamil Nadu, India. It is located between Madukkarai and Walayar. Trains from Coimbatore Junction railway station and Podanur Junction railway station heading to Palakkad Junction railway station passes through this station. It serves primarily for commuters of Amrita Vishwa Vidyapeetham university campus.
