= Ettimadai =

Suburb of Coimbatore, Tamilnadu, India

- Panchayat town
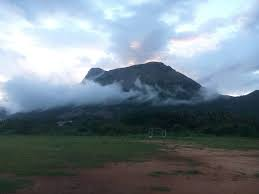

- Location in Tamil Nadu, India Ettimadai (Kerala) Ettimadai (India)
- Coordinates: 10°53′53″N 76°54′01″E
- Country: India
- State: Tamilnadu
- Region: Kongu Nadu
- District: Coimbatore
- Taluk: Madhukkarai

Area
  - Total: 16.44 km^{2} (6.35 sq mi)

Population (2011)
  - Total: 9,352
  - Density: 568.9/km^{2} (1,473/sq mi)

Languages
  - Official: Tamil, English
- Time zone: UTC+5:30 (IST)
- PIN: 641112
- Telephone code: +91-422
- Vehicle registration: TN-99

Ettimadai is a panchayat town in Madukkarai taluk of Coimbatore district in the Indian state of Tamil Nadu. It is located in the north-western part of the state close to the state's border with Kerala. Spread across an area of 16.44 km^{2} (6.35 sq mi), it had a population of 9,352 individuals as per the 2011 census. It is served by the Ettimadai railway station of Southern Railway zone.

== Geography and administration ==
Ettimadai is located in Madukkarai taluk of Coimbatore district in the Indian state of Tamil Nadu. It is located on the highway connecting Coimbatore and Palakkad, close to the state's border with Kerala. Spread across an area of 16.44 km^{2} (6.35 sq mi), it is one of the 33 panchayat towns in the district. It is located in the western part of the state.

The town panchayat is headed by a chairperson, who is elected by the members, who are chosen through direct elections. The town forms part of the Kinathukadavu Assembly constituency that elects its member to the Tamil Nadu legislative assembly and the Pollachi Lok Sabha constituency that elects its member to the Parliament of India. The town is served by the Ettimadai railway station of the Southern Railway zone.

== Demographics ==
As per the 2011 census, Ettimadai had a population of 9,352 individuals across 2,564 households. The population saw a marginal increase compared to the previous census in 2001 when 7,543 inhabitants were registered. The population consisted of 4,676 males and 4,676 females. About 826 individuals were below the age of six years. The entire population is classified as urban. The town has an average literacy rate of 78.8%. About 28.8% of the population belonged to scheduled castes and 7.2% belonged to scheduled tribes.

About 42.1% of the eligible population were employed full-time. Hinduism was the majority religion which was followed by 93.5% of the population, with Christianity (3.8%) and Islam (2.6%) being minor religions. The Amrita Vishwa Vidyapeetham and group of institutions are situated in the region.
