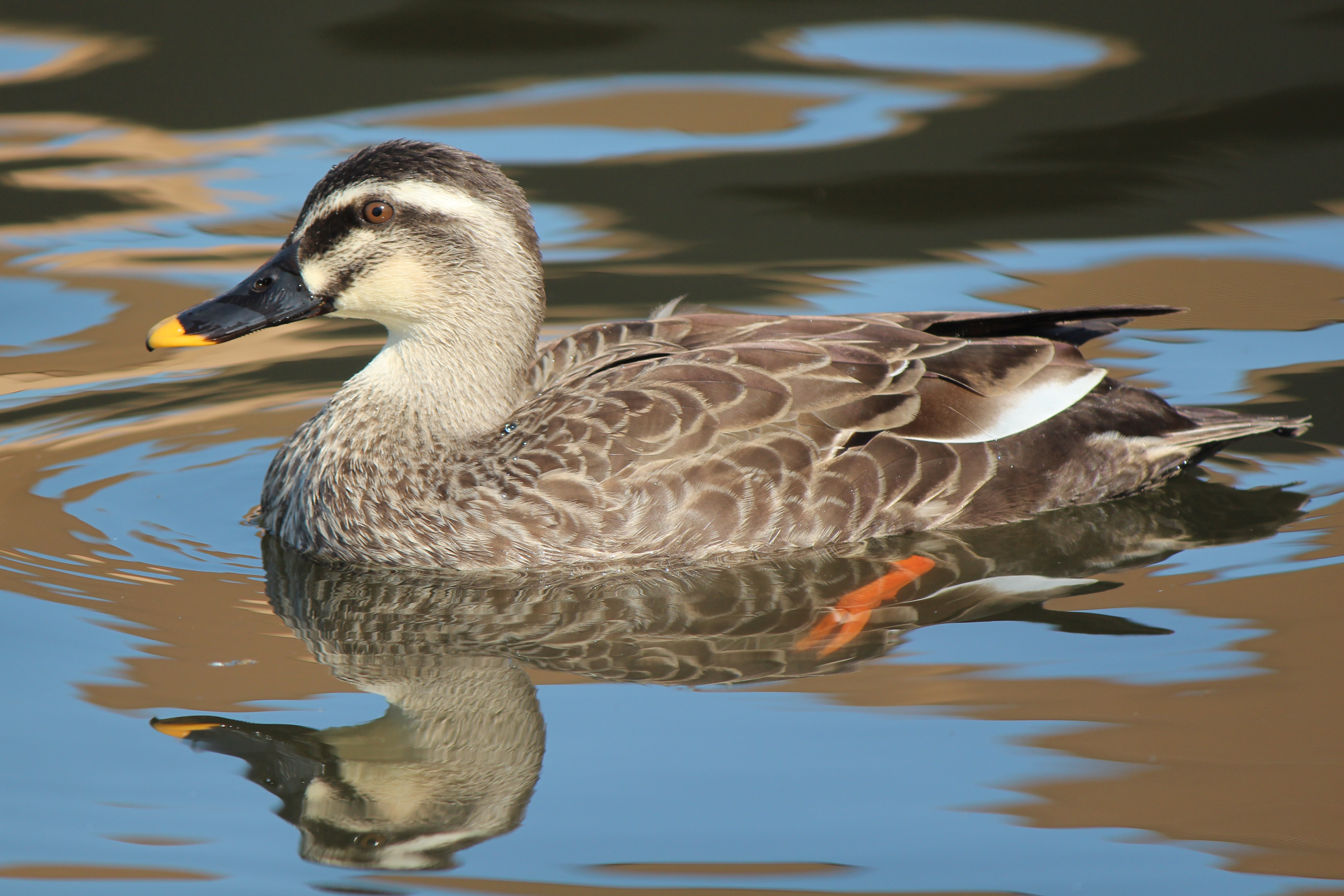
- Swimming in Japan

Conservation status
- Least Concern (IUCN 3.1)

Scientific classification
- Kingdom: Animalia
- Phylum: Chordata
- Class: Aves
- Order: Anseriformes
- Family: Anatidae
- Genus: Anas
- Species: A. zonorhyncha

Binomial name
- Anas zonorhyncha R. Swinhoe, 1866

= Eastern spot-billed duck =

Species of bird

The eastern spot-billed duck or Chinese spot-billed duck (Anas zonorhyncha) is a species of dabbling duck that breeds in East and Southeast Asia. This species was formerly considered a subspecies of the Indian spot-billed duck and both were referred to as the spot-billed duck (A. poecilorhyncha). The name is derived from the yellow spot on the bill.

== Taxonomy ==
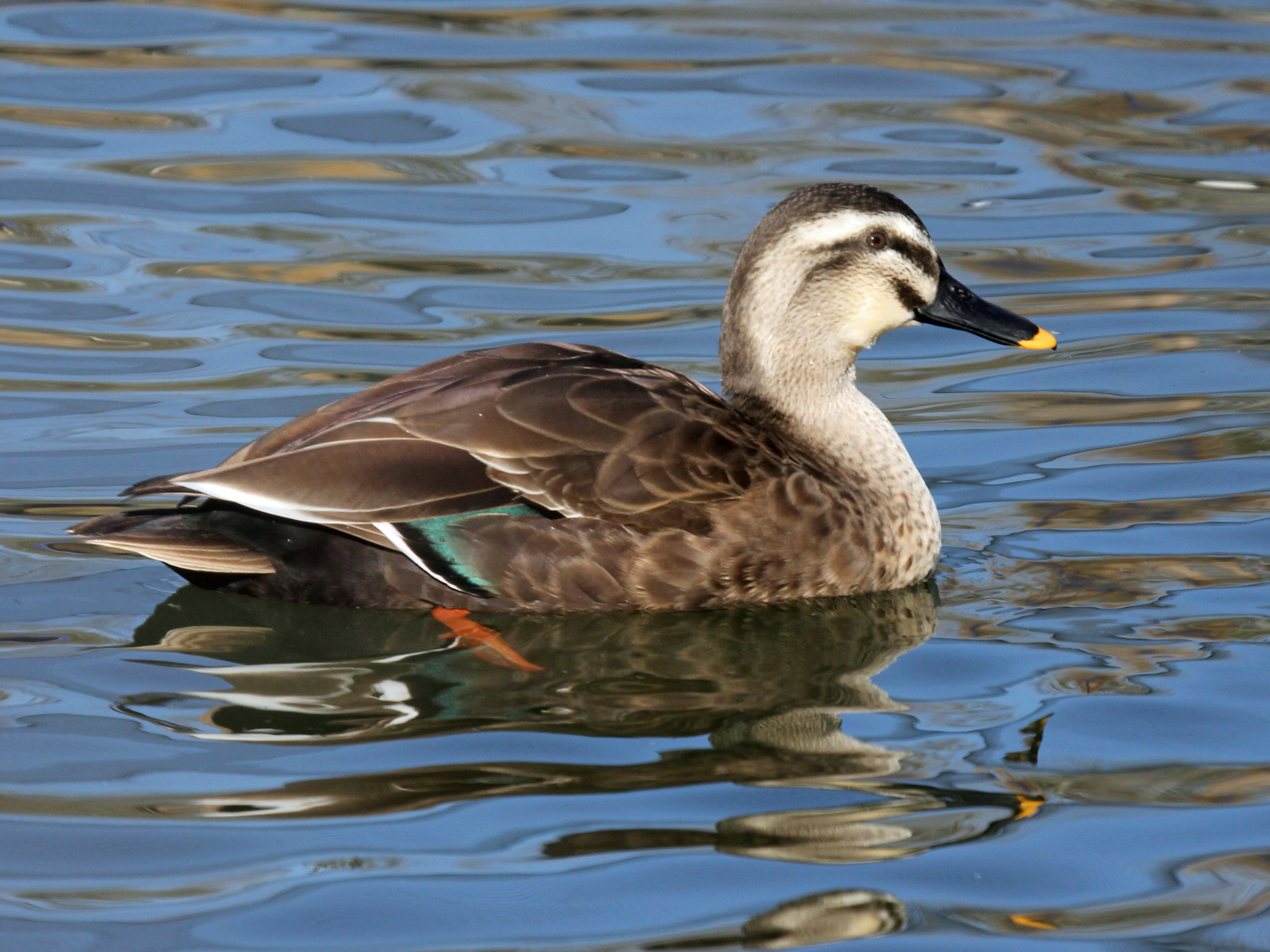
Showing blue speculum

The eastern spot-billed duck was described by the English biologist Robert Swinhoe in 1866 under its current binomial name Anas zonorhyncha. The name of the genus Anas is the Latin word for a duck. The specific epithet zonorhyncha is derived from the classical Greek words zōnē meaning "band" or "girdle" and rhunkhos meaning "bill".

Historically, the eastern spot-billed duck was usually considered as a subspecies of the Indian spot-billed duck (A. poecilorhyncha). The American ornithologist Bradley Livezey in a morphological study of the dabbling ducks published in 1991 proposed that the eastern spot-billed duck should be promoted to species status. Subsequently, fieldwork conducted at Hong Kong in southern China found that although both the eastern spot-billed duck and the Indian spot-billed duck (subspecies A. poecilorhyncha haringtoni) bred in the region at the same time, mixed pairs were only very rarely observed. Base on this observation, the American Ornithologists' Union recognised the eastern spot-billed duck as a separate species in 2008. Most taxonomists now treat the eastern spot-billed duck as a separate species. There is also some degree of hybridization with the mallard in the wild in eastern Russia with a tendency for a greater ratio of male eastern spot-billed ducks to mate with female mallards than the other way round.

== Description ==
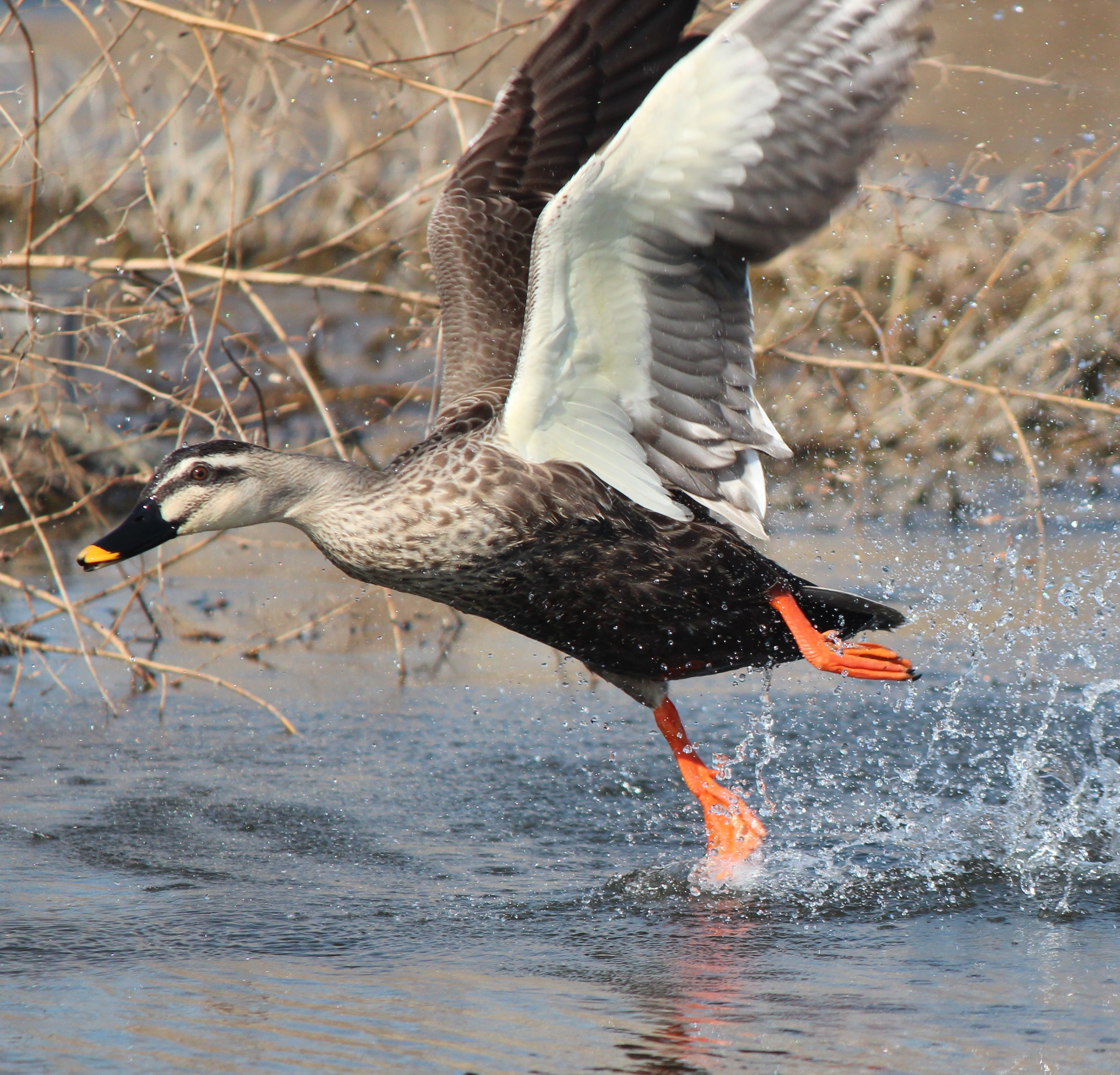
Taking off

This duck is around the same size as a mallard and has a scaly patterned body with a blue speculum. At rest the long neck and the bill with the yellow tip are distinctive. It measures 55–63 cm (22–25 in) in length and 83–95 cm (33–37 in) across the wings, with a body mass of 790–1,500 g (1.74–3.31 lb). These are mainly grey ducks with a paler head and neck and a black bill tipped bright yellow. The wings are whitish with black flight feathers below, and from above show a white-bordered green. The male does not have an eclipse plumage. Juveniles are browner and duller than adults. The legs and feet are bright orange. Both the male and female have calls similar to the mallard, with females producing a loud quack, and males a deeper, quieter sound.

The eastern spot-billed duck is darker and browner than the Indian spot-billed duck; its body plumage is more similar to the Pacific black duck. It lacks the red bill spot, and has a blue speculum.

Both males and females undergo a complete postnuptial moult, dropping all their wing feathers simultaneously.

== Distribution ==
The eastern spot-billed duck is migratory, wintering in southern China and possibly Southeast Asia. It is quite gregarious outside the breeding season and forms small flocks. The populations in Japan and the Russian Far East have expanded their range northwards by more than 500 km since the early 20th century, possibly in reaction to global warming.

It is occasionally a rare vagrant to the Aleutian Islands of Alaska.

It is a bird of freshwater lakes and marshes in fairly open country and feeds by dabbling for plant food mainly in the evening or at night. The breeding season varies with rainfall and water condition but normally between April and July. It nests on the ground in vegetation near water. The clutch is usually 7–9 eggs. Incubation begins after the last egg is laid (allowing the chicks to hatch simultaneously) and the young hatch after about 24 days. The chicks are black with a yellow back and resemble those of mallards but with a wider eyestripe.

== Gallery ==
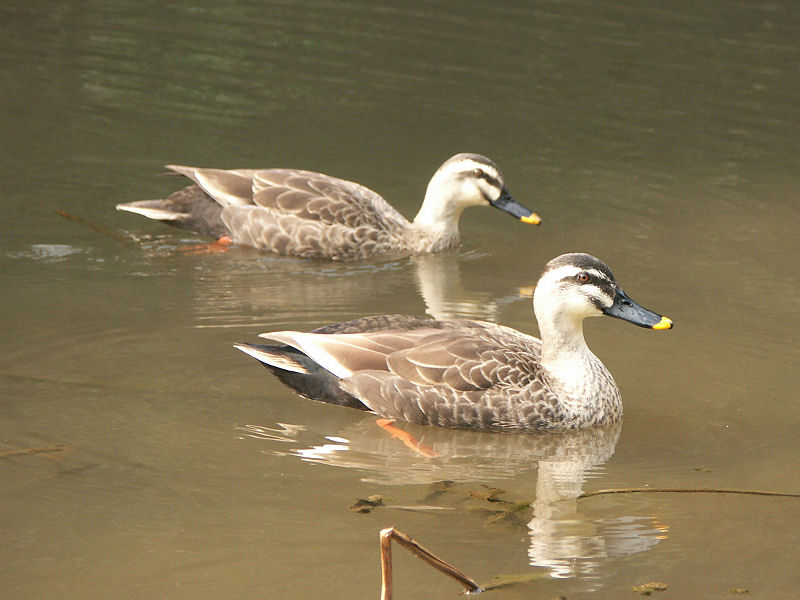
Male (front) and female

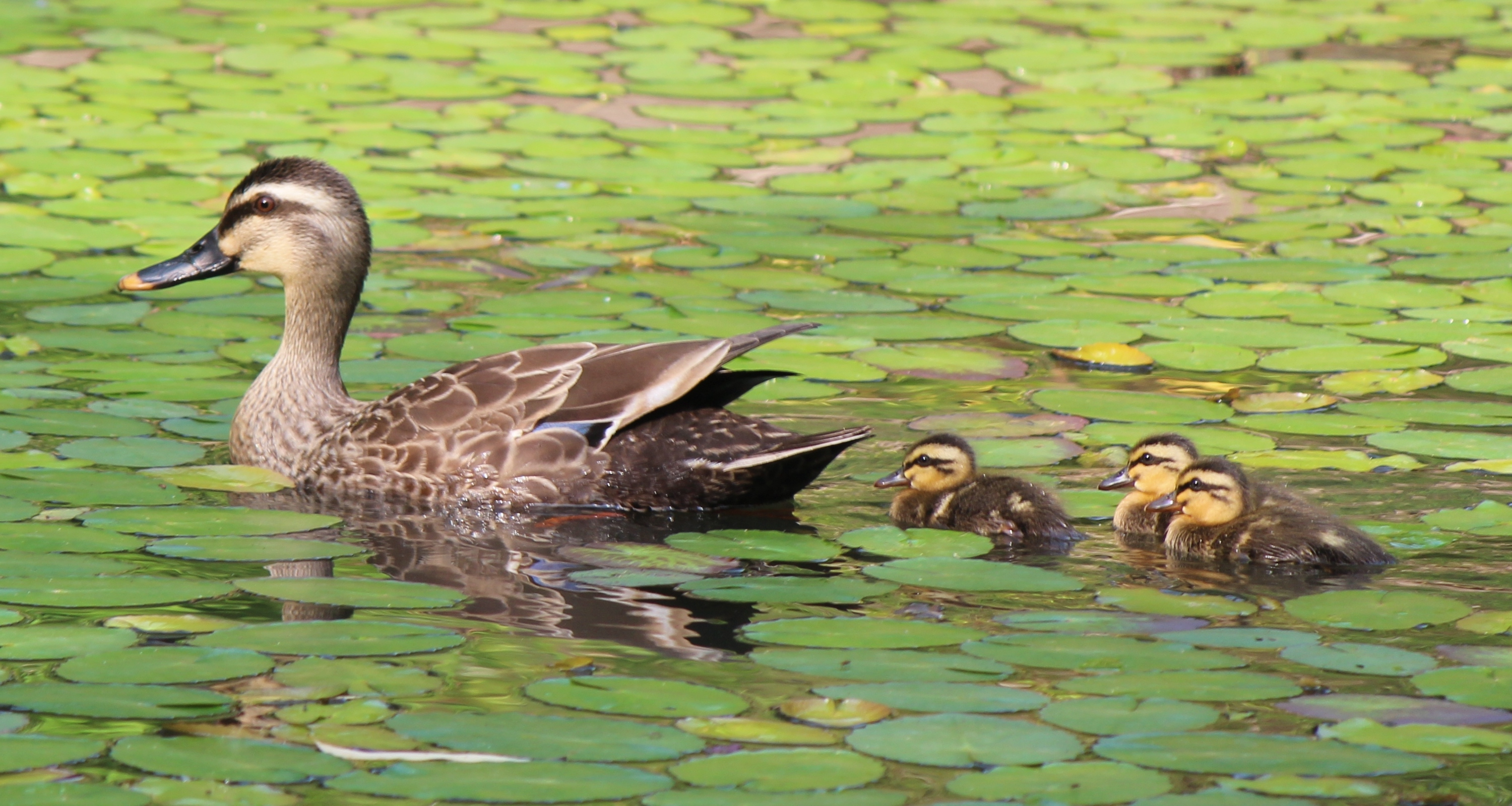
Adult with ducklings
