= Pilamedu railway station =

Railway station in Tamil Nadu, India

Pilamedu

General information
- Location: Peelamedu, Coimbatore, Tamil Nadu
- Coordinates: 11.0330°N 76.9997°E
- Elevation: 420 metres (1,380 ft)
- Line: Jolarpettai–Shoranur line
- Platforms: 3

Construction
- Parking: Available
- Accessible: Yes

Other information
- Status: Functional
- Station code: PLMD
- Zone(s): Southern Railway zone
- Division(s): Salem
Location
- Location within Tamil Nadu

Pilamedu (station code: PLMD) is an Indian railway station in Peelamedu, Coimbatore. It is located between Singanallur and Coimbatore North Junction railway stations. It comes under the purview of the Salem railway division of Southern Railway zone and is categorised as NSG-6 under the Indian railway station classification system.

== See also ==
- Railway stations in Coimbatore
- Transport in Coimbatore
