= Singanallur railway station =

Railway station in Tamil Nadu, India

Singanallur

General information
- Location: Neelikonampalayam, Singanallur, Coimbatore, Tamil Nadu
- Coordinates: 11.012506°N 77.039116°E
- Elevation: 392 metres (1,286 ft)
- Line: Chennai–Coimbatore line
- Platforms: 2

Construction
- Parking: Available
- Accessible: Yes

Other information
- Status: Functional
- Station code: SHI
- Zone(s): Southern Railway zone
- Division(s): Salem
Location
- Location within Tamil Nadu

Singanallur is a railway station in the city of Coimbatore. This railway station is located between Irugur and Pilamedu.

== Coimbatore Suburban Railway ==
Coimbatore Suburban Railway is a circular suburban railway planned for Coimbatore city. The circular railway line will help run through Coimbatore Junction, Podanur, Vellalore, Irugur, Singanallur, Peelamedu and Coimbatore North.

== Connectivity ==
The Singanallur railway station is connected to Gandhipuram Central Bus Terminus which is about 14 km, Ukkadam Bus Terminus is about 10.3 km, Saibaba Colony Bus Terminus is about 14 km, Coimbatore Junction railway station is about 9.9 km and Coimbatore International Airport is about 4.6 km.

== See also ==
- Railway stations in Coimbatore
- Salem railway division
- Coimbatore
- Indian Railways
- Transport in Coimbatore
