= Somanur railway station =

Railway station in Tamil Nadu, India

Somanur

General information
- Location: State Highway 165, Somanur, Sulur Taluk, Coimbatore district, Tamil Nadu, India
- Coordinates: 11.0867°N 77.1858°E
- Elevation: 345 metres (1,132 ft)
- System: Indian Railways station
- Owner: Indian Railways
- Line: Salem Junction–Shoranur Junction line
- Platforms: 2
- Tracks: 4

Construction
- Structure type: On ground
- Parking: Available

Other information
- Status: Active
- Station code: SNO
- Zone(s): Southern Railway zone
- Division(s): Salem
- Fare zone: Southern Railway zone
Location
- Location within India Location within Tamil Nadu

Somanur railway station (station code: SNO) is an NSG–6 category Indian railway station in Salem railway division of Southern Railway zone. It is a station in Coimbatore district of Tamil Nadu, India. It is located between Vanjipalayam and Sulur Road. It is located three km away from Karumathampatti. Trains plying between Tiruppur and Coimbatore passes via Somanur.
