= Kinathukadavu taluk =

Coordinates: 10.82°N 77.02°E

Kinathukadavu
- Taluk
- Interactive map of Kinathukadavu
- Country: India
- State: Tamil Nadu
- District: Coimbatore

Area
  - Total: 298.47 km^{2} (115.24 sq mi)

Kinathukadavu taluk is a taluk in the Coimbatore district of the Indian state of Tamil Nadu. The headquarters is the town of Kinathukadavu. It was carved out of the Pollachi taluk in 2012. It covers an area of 298.47 square kilometres (115.24 sq mi) and had a population of 1,03,880 in 2011.
