= Sulur Road railway station =

Railway station in Tamil Nadu, India

Sulur Road

General information
- Location: Sulur road, Muthugoundenpudur, Coimbatore, Tamil Nadu, India
- Coordinates: 11.0495°N 77.1173°E
- Elevation: 364 metres (1,194 ft)
- System: Indian Railways station
- Owner: Indian Railways
- Line: Salem Junction–Shoranur Junction line
- Platforms: 2
- Tracks: 2

Construction
- Structure type: On ground

Other information
- Status: Active
- Station code: SUU
- Zone(s): Southern Railway zone
- Division(s): Salem
- Fare zone: Southern Railway zone
Location
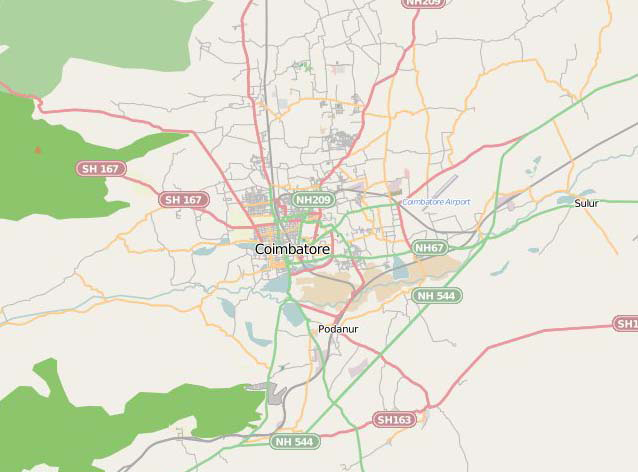
- Location within Coimbatore Location within Tamil Nadu Location within India

Sulur Road (station code: SUU) is an NSG–6 category Indian railway station in Salem railway division of Southern Railway zone. It is a railway station in the Coimbatore suburb of Muthugoundenpudur, near Sulur, Tamil Nadu, India. It is located between Tiruppur Somanur and Irugur Junction.
