= Tiruppur railway station =

Railway station in Tamil Nadu, India

Tiruppur

General information
- Location: Railway Station Road, Tiruppur, Tiruppur district, Tamil Nadu; India
- Coordinates: 11.1086°N 77.3397°E
- Elevation: 305 metres (1,001 ft)
- System: Regional rail, Light rail and Commuter rail station
- Owner: Indian Railways
- Operator: Southern Railway zone
- Line: Jolarpettai–Shoranur line
- Platforms: 2 side platforms
- Tracks: 4
- Connections: Auto rickshaw stand, Taxi stand

Construction
- Structure type: Standard (on ground station)
- Parking: Yes

Other information
- Status: Functioning
- Station code: TUP
- Zone(s): Southern Railway zone
- Division(s): Salem
Location
- Location within Tamil Nadu Location within India

Tiruppur railway station (station code: TUP) is an NSG–3 category Indian railway station in Salem railway division of Southern Railway zone. It is a railway station serving the city of Tiruppur.

== Location and layout ==
The Tiruppur railway station is located at the heart of the Tiruppur city, at close proximity to the Old Bus Station of the city. The new bus stand located at PN road at the Northern part of the city is a 10–15 minutes drive from the station. The station has two platforms and handles 137 trains.

The train station falls on the Chennai–Palakkad broad-gauge line (laid in 1983) which is fully electrified and has two tracks. Almost every daily Express train or long-distance trains has a halt in the station except for a select few such as the Trivandrum Mail and the Bangalore Kochuveli Express.

Despite Tiruppur being one of the top revenue generating stations in the Salem Division, the railway station has only 2 platforms and no starting trains from the city exist. About 30,000 passengers travel to Tiruppur per day despite not being a railway junction. As a result, Tirupur railway station is always over-crowded. Also most of the trains stops for only 2 mins which makes the cargo handling not at all possible.

The nearest airport to the station is the Coimbatore International Airport situated 35 km west of the city. The nearby stations are the suburbs of Kulipalayam towards the East and Vanjipalayam towards the West.

== Projects and development ==
It is one of the 73 stations in Tamil Nadu to be named for upgradation under Amrit Bharat Station Scheme of Indian Railways.

== Awards and achievements ==
In 2019, the station was granted ISO–14001 certification for complying with NGT (nation Green Tribunal).
