= Coimbatore–Pollachi line =

Railway line in India

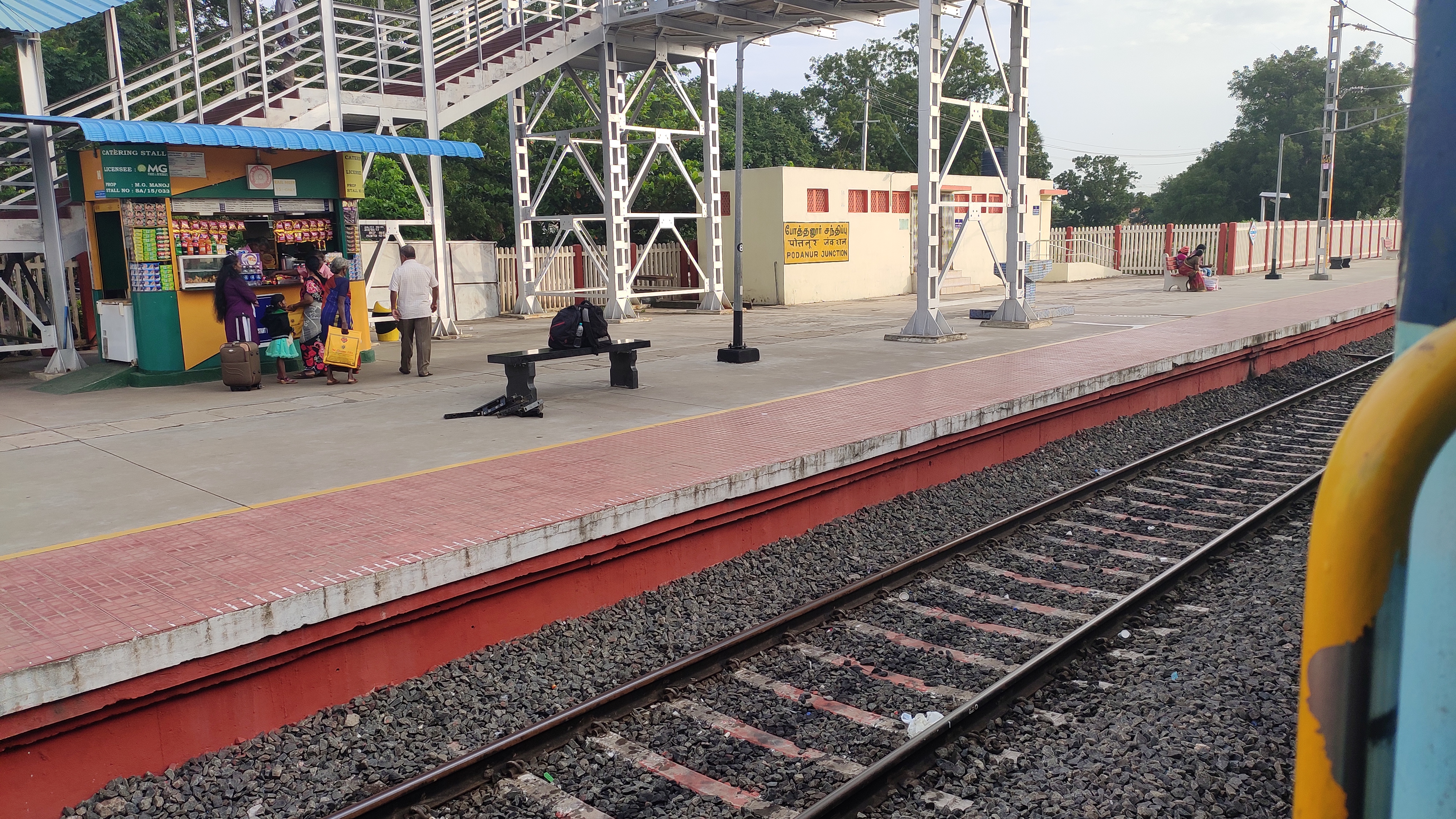
- Podanur Junction lies on the Coimbatore–Pollachi line

Overview
- Status: Operational
- Owner: Indian Railways
- Locale: Tamil Nadu
- Termini: Coimbatore Junction; Pollachi Junction

Service
- Operator(s): Southern Railways; Salem railway division Palakkad railway division
- Rolling stock: WAP-4, WDM-2, WDG-3, WDP-3, WDM-3

History
- Opened: 1915
- Closed: 2008 (for gauge conversion)
- Reopened: 2017

Technical
- Track length: 40 km
- Number of tracks: 1
- Track gauge: 5 ft 6 in (1,676 mm) broad gauge
- Electrification: Electrified

The Coimbatore–Pollachi line is a railway line between Coimbatore and Pollachi in Tamil Nadu, India. The line is a gateway which connects western Tamil Nadu with south Tamil Nadu. Coimbatore is connected to Madurai and other southern districts through this line. During the gauge conversion the line was closed. It was reopened in 2017 and train service resumed.

== History ==
The first service started in 1915 from Pollachi to Podanur line as a metre-gauge section and in 2008 the station was closed for the gauge conversion of the Dindugul–Podanur. The old metre-gauge track on the stretch was in use for 110 years since the first train chugged in 1898 before it was closed 2008 when work began to convert the metre-gauge railway line to broad gauge as part of the Dindugul–Palakkad section. On 24 March 2017, CRS successfully completed its speed trial and inspection along with Podanur–Pollachi newly laid broad-gauge line. The inspection was very satisfactory according to CRS. Mr. KA Manohar, Bangalore. Train service resumed in July 2017 and a passenger train was introduced between Coimbatore and Pollachi.

== Station ==
Stations like Podanur Junction, Kinathukadavu are present in this section. There has been a request to revive defunct stations like Chettipalayam, Nallatipalayam, Koilpalayam and Tamaraikulam.

== Gauge conversion ==
The line was closed for gauge conversion in 2008. Rail service was stopped for eight years. In 2017, the Coimbatore–Pollachi line gauge conversion was completed and train service resumed with one passenger train. Before the conversion which was completed in April 2017, the line was formerly 1,000 mm (3 ft 3 3/8 in) metre gauge between Podanur Junction and Pollachi Junction.

Currently, the following trains operate between Pollachi and Coimbatore:

56110 Pollachi – Coimbatore Passenger 16722 MDU – CBE Express/Intercity 56114 Pollachi – Coimbatore Passenger 06030 Tirunelveli – Mettupalayam Fare Special 16766 Tuticorin – Mettupalayam Express

Additionally, Railways occasionally operate special trains on demand, such as:

06106 Coimbatore Jn – Dindigul Jn Unreserved MEMU Express 06124 Rameswaram – Coimbatore Special (Unreserved) 06184/06185 Tambaram – Podanur / Coimbatore – Tambaram Weekly Special Express

Proposed Extensions:

Extension of trains via Pollachi–Podanur line, including:

Trains 22665/22666 (Day Express Bengaluru–Coimbatore) proposed to extend to Palakkad via Pollachi Extension of 56801/56802 passenger train to Coimbatore via Pollachi and Cuddalore Port (proposal submitted by Southern Railway to the Railway Board)
