= Vanjipalayam railway station =

Railway station in Tamil Nadu, India

Vanjipalaiyam

General information
- Location: Avinashi-Mangalam Main Road, Vanjipalayam, Tiruppur Dist, Tamil Nadu, India
- Coordinates: 11.1183°N 77.2665°E
- Elevation: 322 metres (1,056 ft)
- System: Indian Railways station
- Owner: Indian Railways
- Line: Salem Junction–Shoranur Junction line
- Platforms: 2
- Tracks: 2

Construction
- Structure type: On ground

Other information
- Status: Functioning
- Station code: VNJ
- Zone(s): Southern Railway zone
- Division(s): Salem
- Fare zone: Southern Railway zone

History
- Electrified: Double electric line
Location
- Location within India Location within Tamil Nadu

Vanjipalayam railway station (station code: VNJ) is an NSG–6 category Indian railway station in Salem railway division of Southern Railway zone. It is a station in Tiruppur district of Tamil Nadu, India. It is located between Tiruppur and Somanur railway station. All trains plying between Tiruppur railway station and Coimbatore Junction railway station passes through this.
