= Kinathukadavu =

- Panchayat town
- Location in Tamil Nadu, India
- Coordinates: 10°49′21″N 77°00′58″E
- Country: India
- State: Tamil Nadu
- District: Coimbatore

Area
  - Total: 8.69 km^{2} (3.36 sq mi)

Population (2011)
  - Total: 8,653
  - Density: 996/km^{2} (2,580/sq mi)

Languages
  - Official: Tamil
- Time zone: UTC+5:30 (IST)

Kinathukadavu is a panchayat town in Coimbatore district in the Indian state of Tamil Nadu. It is located in the north-western part of the state, and is the headquarters of the Kinathukadavu taluk. Spread across an area of 8.69 km^{2} (3.36 sq mi), it had a population of 8,653 individuals as per the 2011 census.

== Geography and administration ==
Kinathukadavu is the headquarters of Kinathukadavu taluk of Coimbatore district in the Indian state of Tamil Nadu. Spread across an area of 8.69 km^{2} (3.36 sq mi), it is one of the 33 panchayat towns in the district. It is located in the western part of the state. The region has a tropical climate with hot summers and mild winters. The highest temperatures are recorded in April and May, with lowest recordings in December–January.

The town panchayat is headed by a chairperson, who is elected by the members, who are chosen through direct elections. The town forms part of the Kinathukadavu Assembly constituency that elects its member to the Tamil Nadu legislative assembly and the Pollachi Lok Sabha constituency that elects its member to the Parliament of India.

== Demographics ==
As per the 2011 census, Kinathukadavu had a population of 8,653 individuals across 2,469 households. The population saw a marginal increase compared to the previous census in 2001 when8,651 inhabitants were registered. The population consisted of 4,271 males and 4,382 females. About 737 individuals were below the age of six years. The entire population is classified as urban. The town has an average literacy rate of 82.9%. About 14.6% of the population belonged to scheduled castes.

About 42.9% of the eligible population were employed, of which majority were involved in agriculture and allied activities. In 2024, the Government of Tamil Nadu announced the establishment of an industrial part near the town. Hinduism was the majority religion which was followed by 92.1% of the population, with Christianity (5.5%) and Islam (2.3%) being minor religions.

== Transportation ==
Kinathukadavu railway station is located 25 km from Coimbatore Junction in the Coimbatore–Pollachi line.
