= Chettipalayam railway station =

Railway station in Tamil Nadu, India

Chettipalayam

General information
- Location: India
- Coordinates: 10.915341°N 77.033429°E
- Elevation: 409 metres (1,342 ft)
- System: Indian Railways station
- Owner: Indian Railways
- Operator: Salem railway division
- Line: Coimbatore–Pollachi line
- Tracks: 1

Construction
- Structure type: Standard (on-ground station)
- Parking: No
- Cycle facilities: No

Other information
- Status: Defunct
- Station code: CIM
- Zone(s): Southern Railway zone
- Division(s): Salem
Route map
Location

Chettipalayam railway station is a suburban railway station of Coimbatore situated in Coimbatore–Pollachi line. The station became defunct in the 2000s. Several protests have been made to reopen the railway station.
