= Madukkarai railway station =

Railway station in Tamil Nadu, India

General information
- Location: Madukkarai, Coimbatore, Tamil Nadu
- Coordinates: 10.900658°N 76.942698°E
- Elevation: 344 metres (1,129 ft)
- Line: Coimbatore–Shoranur line
- Platforms: 2

Construction
- Parking: Available

Other information
- Status: Functional
- Station code: MDKI
- Zone(s): Southern Railway zone
- Division(s): Palakkad
Location
- Location within Tamil Nadu

Madukkarai railway station (station code: MDKI) is an NSG–6 category Indian railway station in Palakkad railway division of Southern Railway zone. It is a train station in Madukkarai, situated west of Coimbatore, at the extreme western part of the state of Tamil Nadu.
