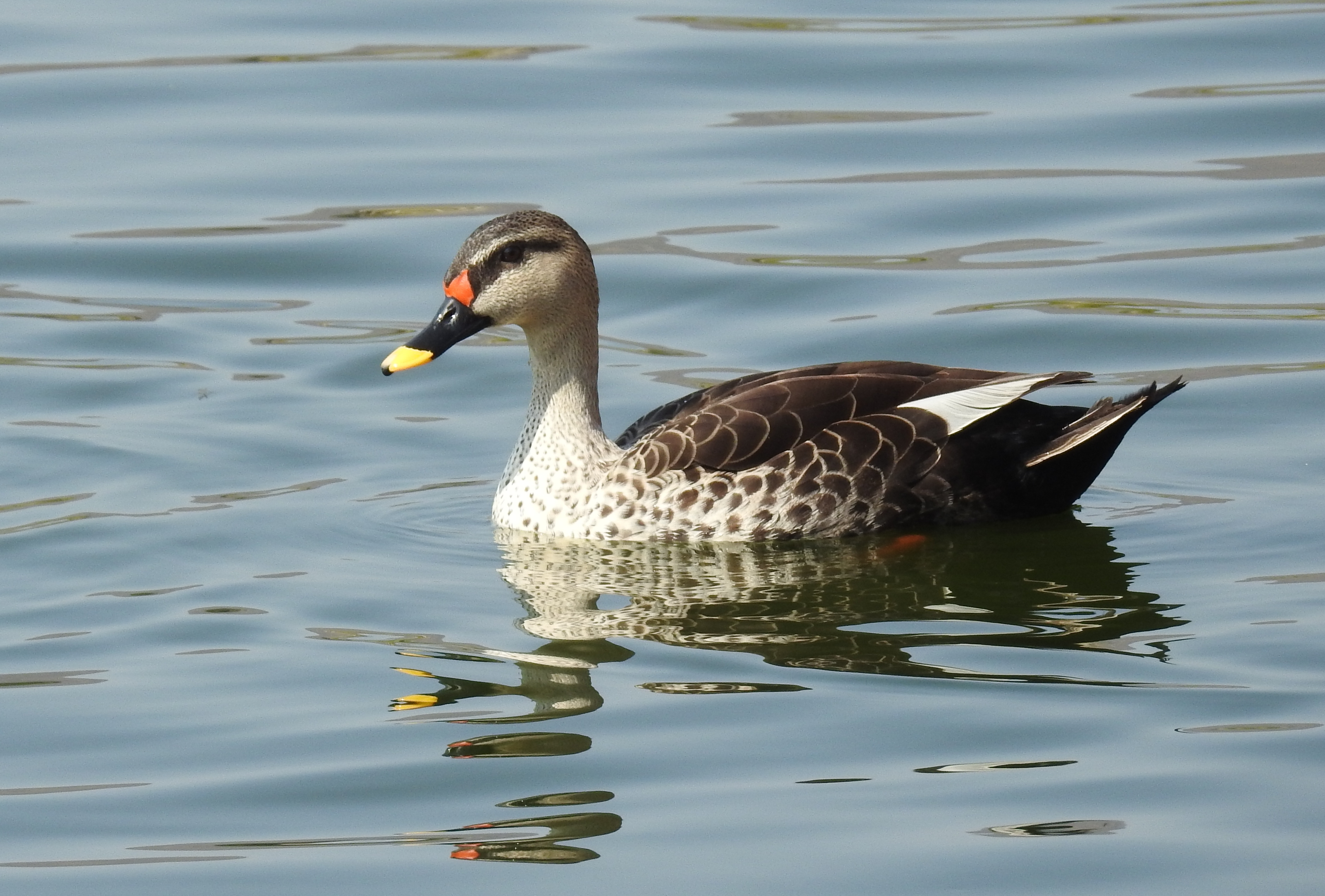
- Anas poecilorhyncha poecilorhyncha

Conservation status
- Least Concern (IUCN 3.1)

Scientific classification
- Kingdom: Animalia
- Phylum: Chordata
- Class: Aves
- Order: Anseriformes
- Family: Anatidae
- Genus: Anas
- Species: A. poecilorhyncha

Binomial name
- Anas poecilorhyncha Forster, 1781

Subspecies
- Anas poecilorhyncha poecilorhyncha Forster, 1781; Anas poecilorhyncha haringtoni (Oates, 1907)
- Approximate breeding ranges

Synonyms
- Anas poikilorhynchus

Audio
- Calls

= Indian spot-billed duck =

Species of bird

The Indian spot-billed duck (Anas poecilorhyncha) is a species of large dabbling duck that is a non-migratory breeding duck throughout freshwater wetlands in the Indian subcontinent. The name is derived from the red spot at the base of the bill that is found in the mainland Indian population. When in water it can be recognized from a long distance by the white tertials that form a stripe on the side, and in flight it is distinguished by the green speculum with a broad white band at the base. This species and the eastern spot-billed duck (A. zonorhyncha) were formerly considered conspecific, together called the spot-billed duck (A. poecilorhyncha).

== Taxonomy ==
The Indian spot-billed duck was described by the naturalist Johann Reinhold Forster in 1781 under its current binomial name Anas poecilorhyncha. The name of the genus Anas is the Latin word for a duck. The specific epithet poecilorhyncha combines the classical Greek words poikilos meaning "pied" or "spotted" and rhunkhos meaning a "bill".

A molecular phylogenetic study published in 2009 that compared mitochondrial DNA sequences from ducks, geese and swans in the family Anatidae found that the Indian spot-billed duck was a sister species to a clade containing the Mexican duck, the American black duck, the mottled duck and the mallard. A 2014 study, however, shows that there is discordance between the phylogenies obtained using nuclear DNA sequences; the Indian spot-bill appears to be closer to the Laysan and Hawaiian ducks and forming a sister clade to the New World and Old World mallards and the Mexican, American black and mottled ducks. There is significant hybridization between Old World mallards and eastern spot-billed ducks, leading to a closeness in their mitochondrial DNA that alters the apparent phylogenies.

Two subspecies are recognised although intergradation is possible (intermediates between haringtoni and eastern spot-billed duck have been recorded):

- A. p. poecilorhyncha Forster, 1781 – India and Sri Lanka
- A. p. haringtoni (Oates, 1907) – Myanmar to southern China and Laos (named after Herbert Hastings Harington (1868–1916))

The eastern spot-billed duck was formerly considered as a third subspecies. Fieldwork carried out at Hong Kong in southern China and published in 2006 found that although both the eastern spot-billed duck and the Indian spot-billed duck (subspecies A. p. haringtoni) bred in the region at the same time, mixed pairs were only very rarely observed. Based on this observation most taxonomists now treat the eastern spot-billed duck as a separate species.

== Description ==
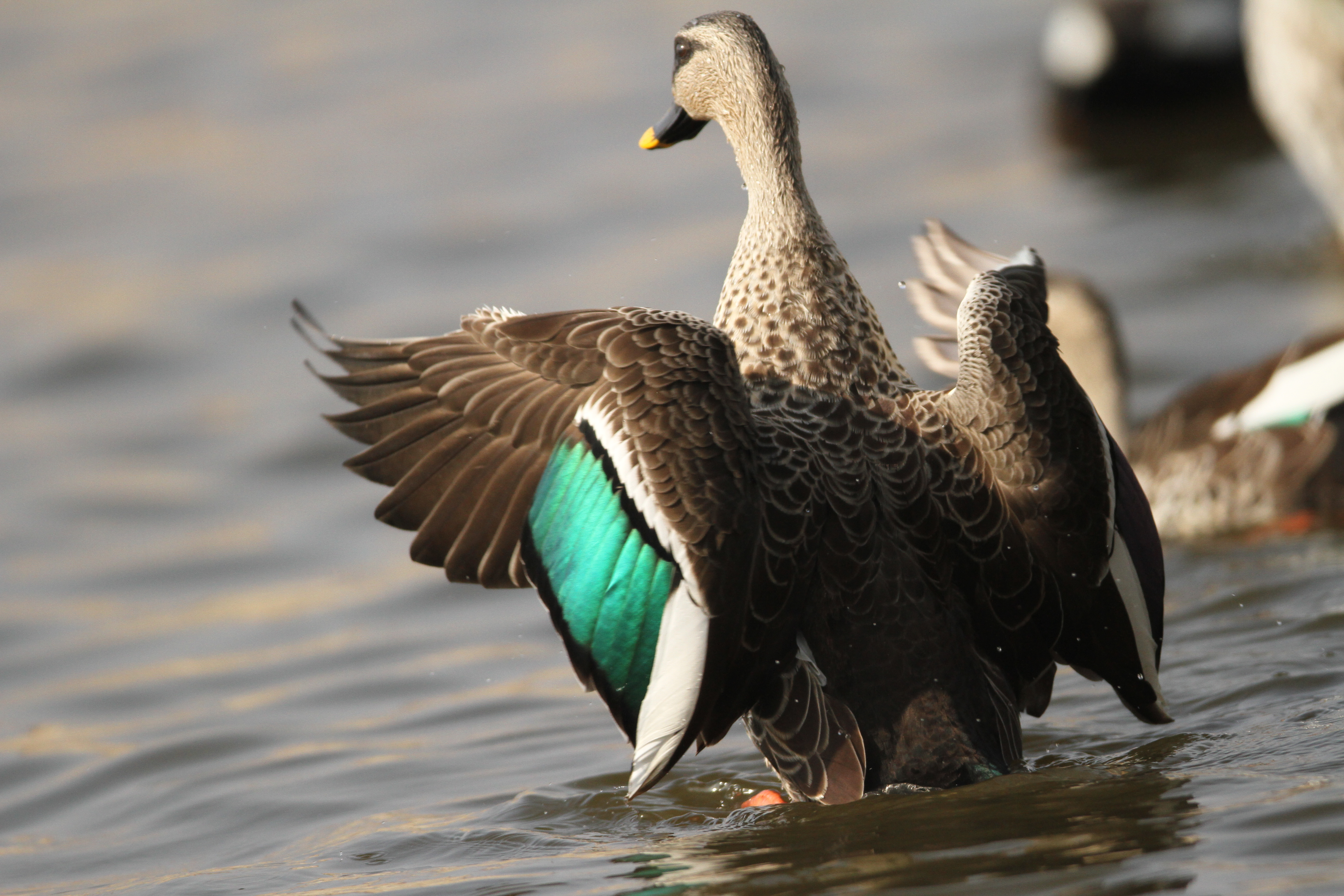
Characteristic green speculum with white base and white tertials

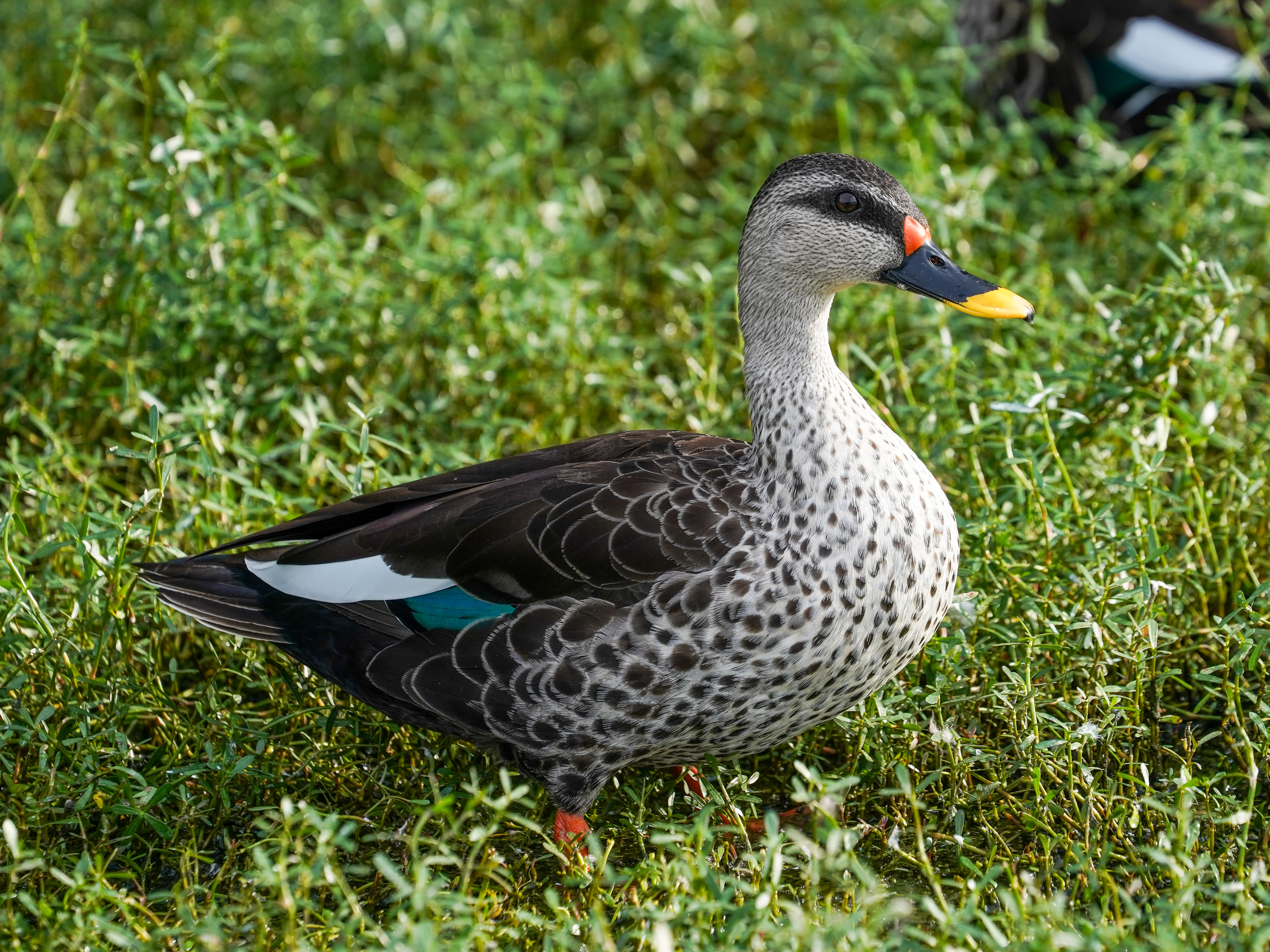
Male with red spot at the base of bill

This duck is around the same size as a mallard and has a scaly patterned body with a green speculum bordered by white. At rest the white stripe stands out and the long neck and the bill with yellow tip and orange red spots at the base are distinctive in the nominate subspecies. In flight it is distinguished by the green speculum with a broad white band at the base. The red spots at the base of the bills are absent in haringtoni. It measures 55–63 cm (22–25 in) in length and 83–95 cm (33–37 in) across the wings, with a body mass of 790–1,500 g (1.74–3.31 lb). These are mainly grey ducks with a paler head and neck and a black bill tipped bright yellow. The wings are whitish with black flight feathers below, and from above show a white-bordered green The male has a red spot on the base of the bill, which is absent or inconspicuous in the smaller but otherwise similar female. The male does not have an eclipse plumage. The legs and feet are bright orange to coral red. Juveniles are browner and duller than adults.

The eastern spot-billed duck is darker and browner; its body plumage is more similar to the Pacific black duck. It lacks the red bill spot, and has a blue speculum.

Both males and females undergo a complete post-breeding moult, dropping all their wing feathers simultaneously.

== Distribution ==
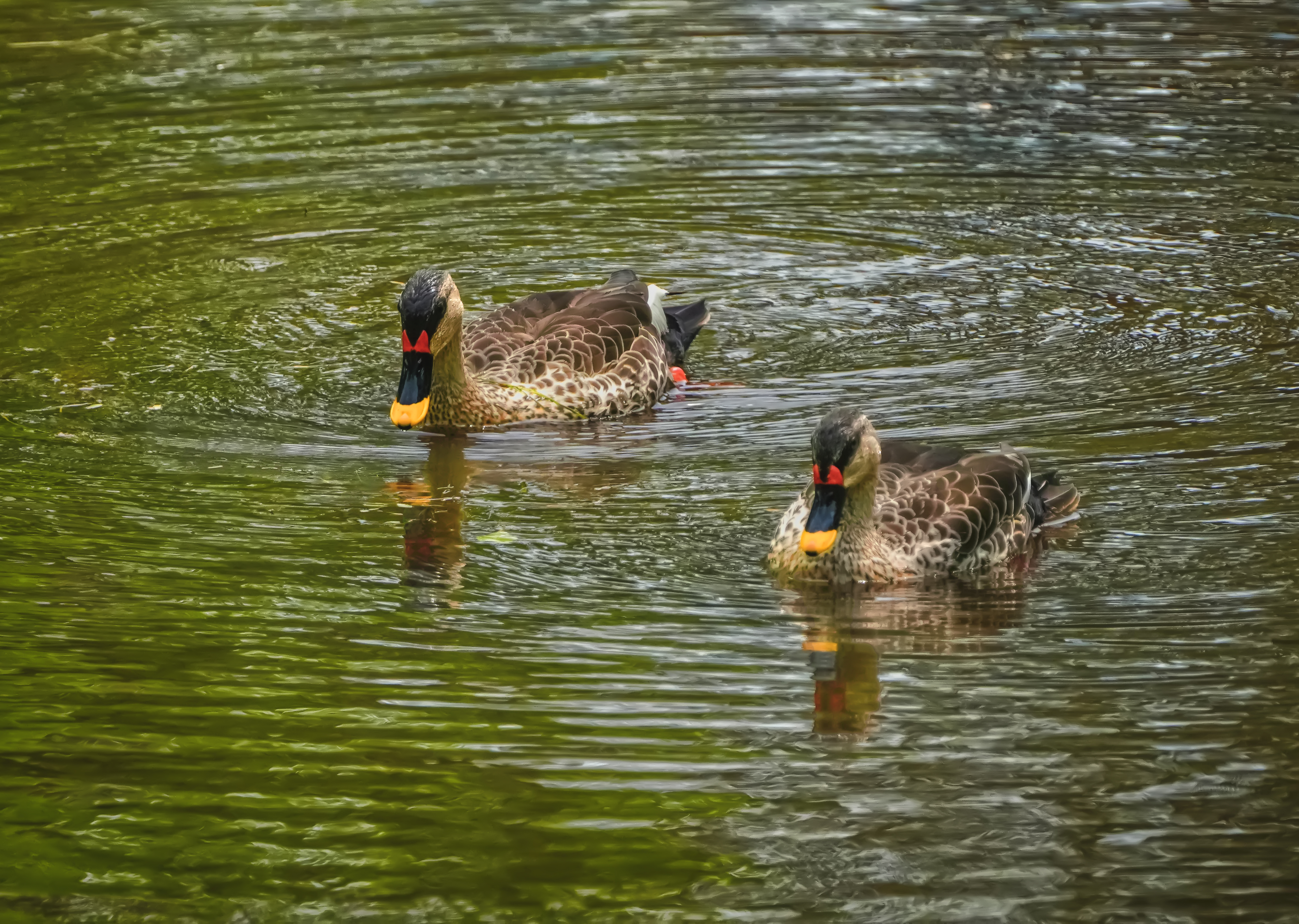
A pair of Indian spot-billed duck at Kaziranga National Park

This duck is a resident throughout Pakistan and India in freshwater wetlands. They tend to avoid very large patches of open water and prefer medium-sized wetlands with vegetation cover. Some individuals may however migrate as a bird ringed at Bharatpur in Rajasthan on 5 December 1969 was recovered near Novosibirsk in August 1970. It is quite gregarious outside the breeding season and forms small flocks. The northernmost populations have expanded their range northwards by more than 500 km since the early 20th century, possibly in reaction to global warming.

== Biology ==
It is a bird of freshwater lakes and marshes in fairly open country and feeds by dabbling for plant food mainly in the evening or at night. The breeding season varies with rainfall and water condition but is July to September in northern India and November to December in southern India. Multiple broods may be raised. It nests on the ground hidden in vegetation near water, and lays 8-14 eggs. Nests have sometimes been seen on tree branches covered by creepers. Incubation begins after the last egg is laid (allowing the chicks to hatch simultaneously) and the young hatch after about 24 days. The chicks are black with a yellow back and resemble those of mallards but with a wider eyestripe.

Both the male and female have calls similar to that of the mallard. Mallards and eastern spot-billed ducks have been known to hybridize in the wild in eastern Russia and their genetic closeness has been examined in many studies. Indian spot-billed ducks feed on plants, including crops such as rice, as well as invertebrates including snails. Through snails such as Lymnaea luteola, they also get infected by cercarian trematodes such as Echinoparyphium bagulai. Adult trematodes emerge from the duck after about 21 days. Other trematodes recorded in the species include Psilochasmus oxyurus while helminths include Opisthorchis obsequens, Notocotylus babai, N. linearis, Echinoparyphium clerci, Amidostomum skrjabini, and Hymenolepis wardlei.

They are seen isolated from other species and usually in pairs or small groups and when disturbed they can take off easily and nearly vertically from the water. They were hunted extensively in British India, noted for their excellent taste. When shot at, especially when in moult, they are known to dive and remain underwater to evade capture. A local name for it was "gheret-pai" or "garam-pai". In southern India, a method of hunting involved using floating bundles of rushes on which the hunters lay in wait. Natural predators of the ducks include birds of prey and terrestrial predators including pythons and otters.

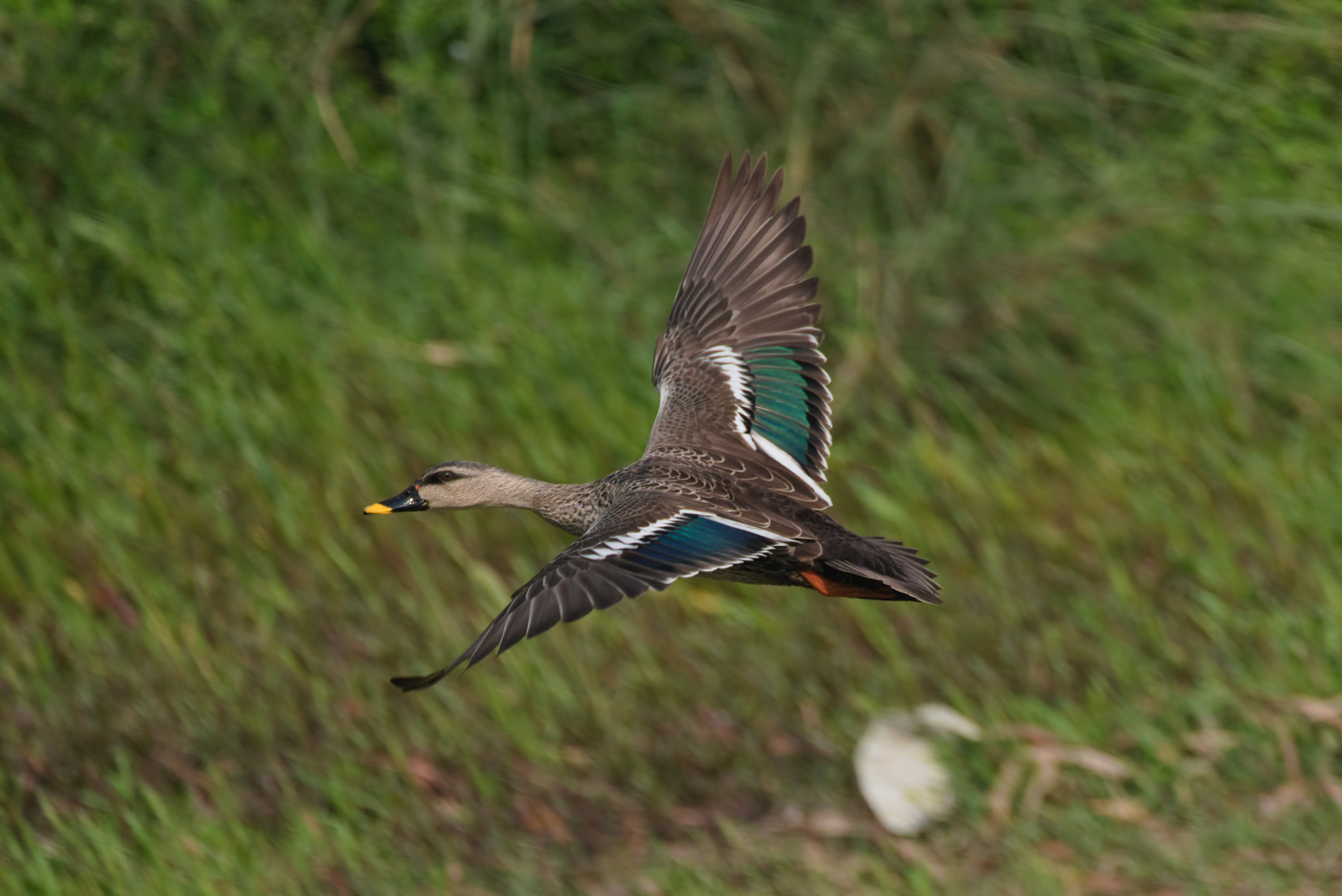
In flight with distinctive green speculum

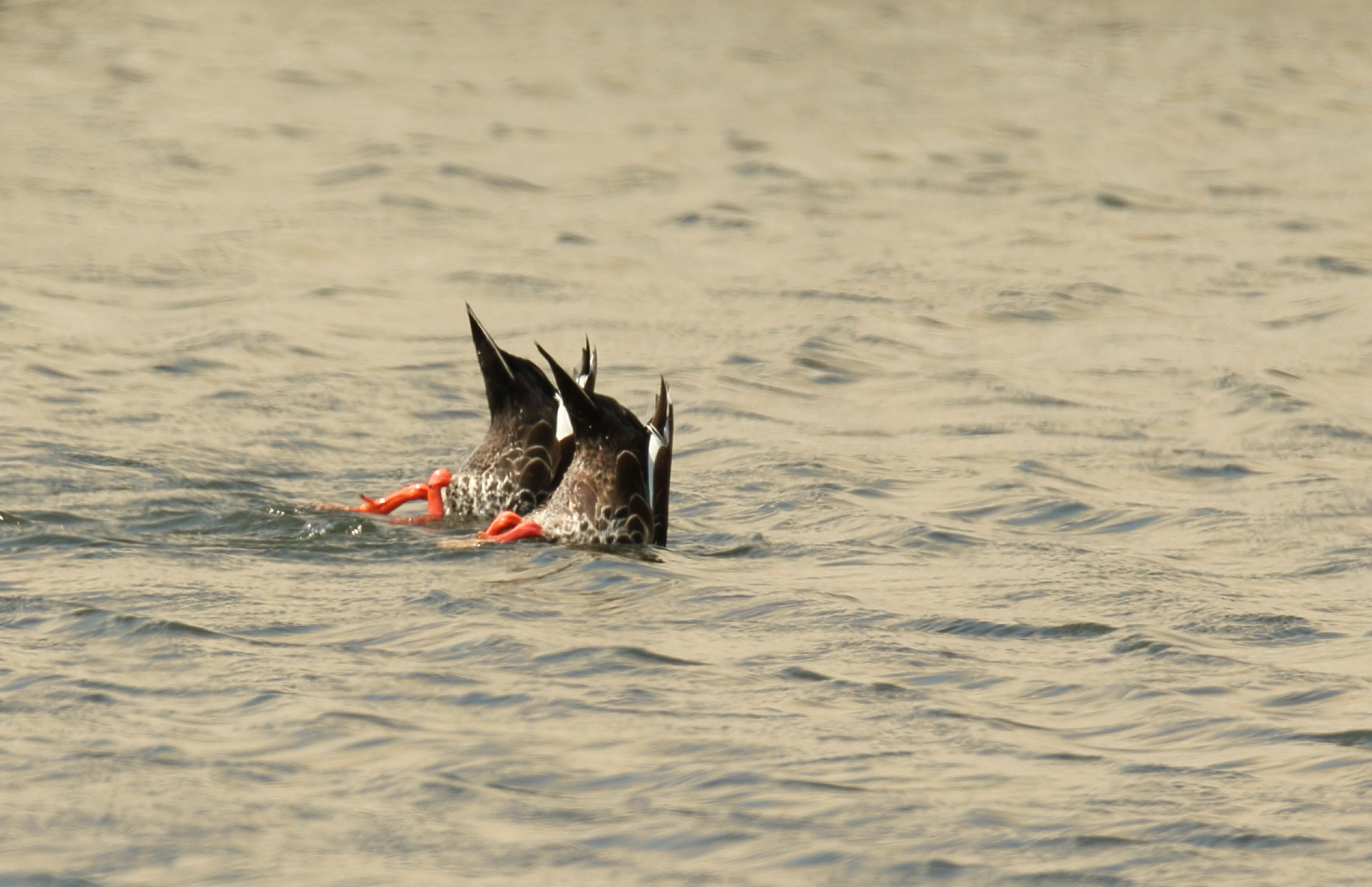
Pair up-ending to feed

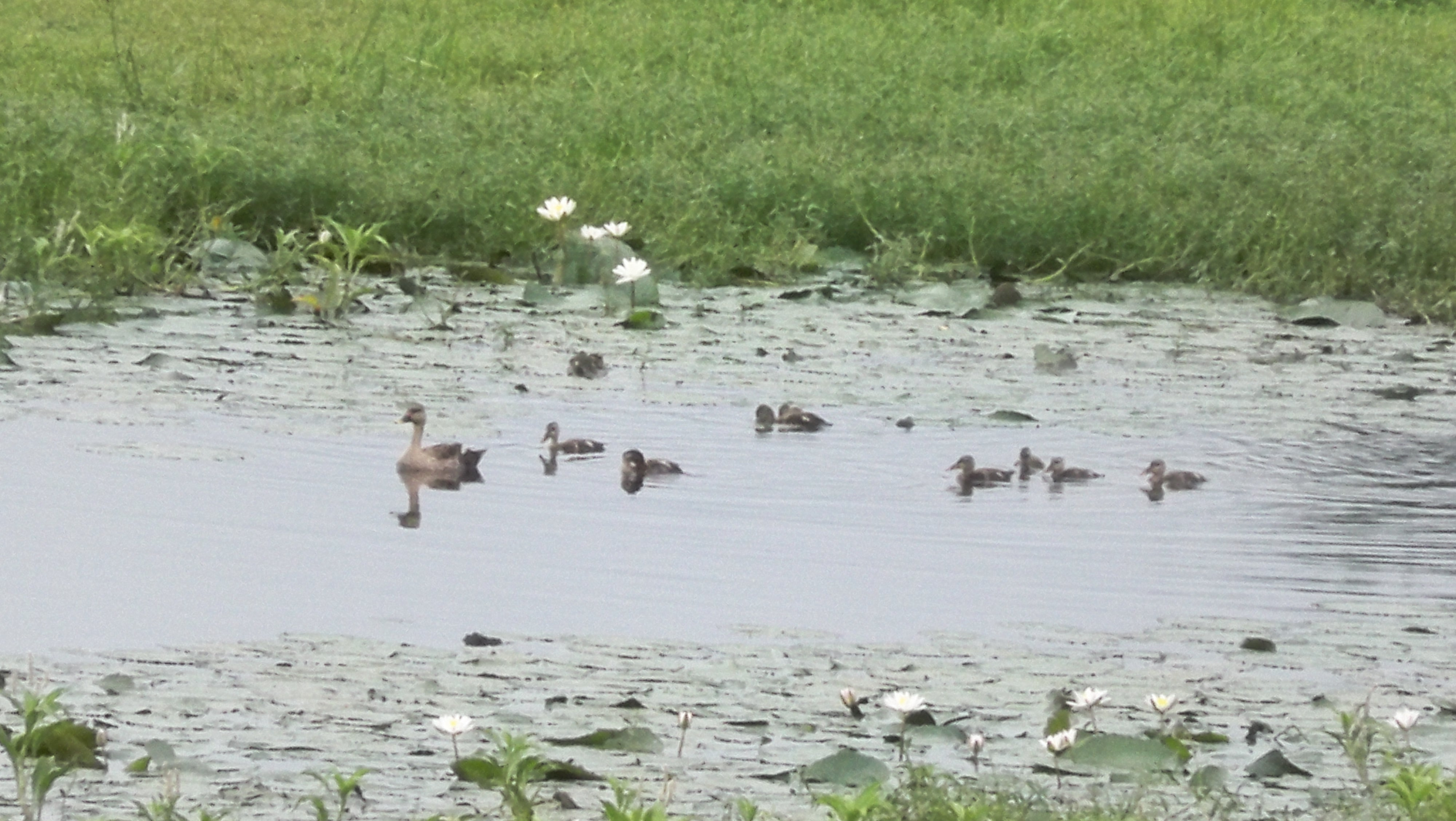
With ducklings

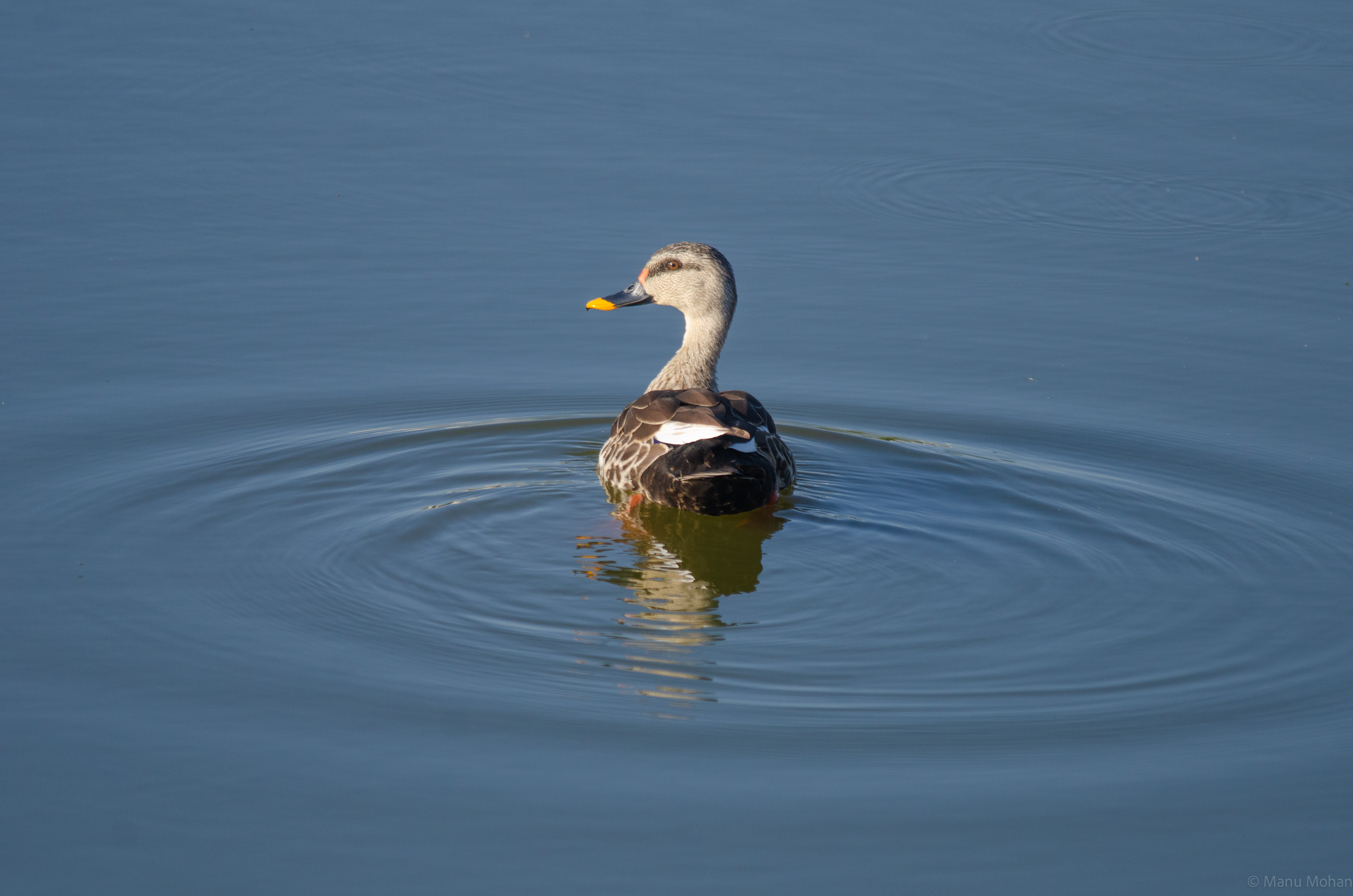
In Agrahara Lake Bangalore

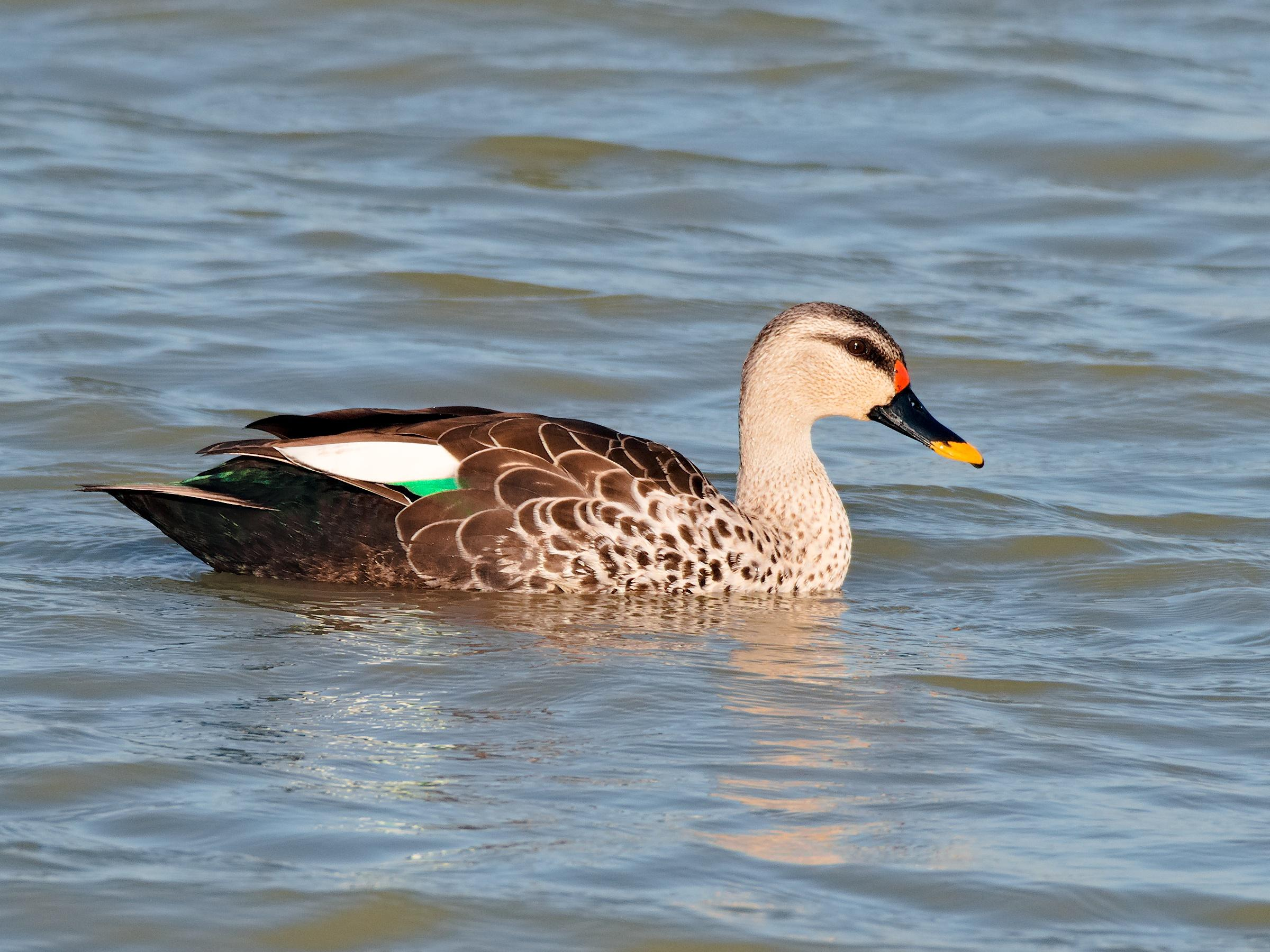
In Kaziranga National Park

Feeding in Japan
