= Irugur Junction railway station =

Railway station in Tamil Nadu, India

Irugur Junction

General information
- Location: Irugur, Coimbatore, Tamil Nadu, India; India
- Coordinates: 11.0166°N 77.0685°E
- Elevation: 296 m (971 ft)
- System: Indian Railways station
- Owner: Southern Railway zone of the Indian Railways
- Line: Jolarpettai–Shoranur line Salem–Palakkad line (bypassing Coimbatore Junction)
- Platforms: 2
- Tracks: 8

Construction
- Structure type: Standard (on-ground station)
- Parking: available

Other information
- Status: Functioning
- Station code: IGU
- Zone(s): Southern Railway
- Division(s): Salem
- Fare zone: Southern Railway
Location
- Location within India Location within Tamil Nadu

Irugur Junction (code: IGU) is a NSG-6 railway station in Irugur, Coimbatore, Tamil Nadu, India.

The station has two platforms and is a junction on the Coimbatore Junction–Erode Junction main line with branch line towards Mettupalayam.

The station has been criticised for not offering Disabled friendly platforms in comparison to other stations in Coimbatore.Three trains - Coimbatore-Mayiladuthurai Jan Shatabdi Express, Erode-Coimbatore MEMU and Erode-Palakkad Town MEMU - halt at Irugur Junction.

== See also ==
- Railway stations in Coimbatore
- Salem railway division
- Coimbatore
- Indian Railways
- Transport in Coimbatore
