= Kinathukadavu railway station =

Railway station in Tamil Nadu, India

General information
- Location: Railway station road Kinathukadavu, Coimbatore, Tamil Nadia
- Coordinates: 10.828437°N 77.025506°E
- Elevation: 335 m (1,099 ft)
- System: broad gauge
- Owner: Indian Railways
- Line: Coimbatore–Pollachi line
- Platforms: 2

Construction
- Parking: Available

Other information
- Status: Functional
- Station code: CNV
- Fare zone: Southern Railway zone

Passengers
- Coimbatore - Pollachi, Coimbatore Madurai, Pollachi - Coimbatore, Madurai - Coimbatore

Services
Preceding station	Indian Railways	Following station
Podanur towards	Southern Railway zone	Pollachi Junction towards
Location
- Location within India Location within Tamil Nadu

Kinathukadavu railway station (station code: CNV) is an NSG–6 category Indian railway station in Palakkad railway division of Southern Railway zone. It is located in the Coimbatore–Pollachi line. Train service resumed after gauge conversion works finished in 2017.
