= Amrita (disambiguation) =

Amrita, sometimes spelled Amritha, literally means "immortality" and is often referred to in ancient Indian texts as nectar or ambrosia and carries the same meaning.

Amrita may also refer to:

== Books ==
- Amrita (Gujarati novel), 1965 novel in Gujarati by Indian writer Raghuveer Chaudhari
- Amrita (Yoshimoto novel), 1994 novel by Banana Yoshimoto

== Health and education ==
=== Mata Amritanandamayi ===
Institutions associated with Indian spiritual leader Mata Amritanandamayi.

- Amrita Hospital, Kochi, Kerala, India
- Amrita Hospital, Faridabad, Harayana, India
- Amrita Schools of Business, business schools in India
- Amrita Schools of Engineering, engineering schools in India
- Amrita College of Engineering & Technology, Erachakulam, Tamil Nadu, India
- Amrita Vidyalayam, chain of secondary schools in India
- Amrita Vishwa Vidyapeetham, private university in Coimbatore, India
  - Amrita Learning, Indian online education platform

== People ==
- Amrita Acharia, Norwegian actress of Nepalese origin
- Amrita Agrahari, Nepalese politician
- Amrita Arora, Indian actress in Hindi cinema
- Amrita Basu, Indian-American academic
- Amrita Chattopadhyay, Indian actress in Bengali cinema
- Amrita Chaudhry, Indian journalist
- Amrita Cheema, Indian journalist
- Amrita Deonarine, Trinidadian politician
- Amrita Gogoi, Indian film and television actress
- Amrita Hunjan, British-Indian model and singer
- Amrita Kak, Indian musician
- Amrita Lal Basu, Indian playwright
- Amrita Meghwal, Indian politician
- Amrita Mukherjee, Indian television actor
- Amrita Narlikar, Indian academic
- Amrita Patel, Indian businesswoman
- Amrita Prakash, Indian model and actress
- Amrita Pritam, Indian writer
- Amrita Puri, Indian actress
- Amrita Raichand, Indian celebrity chef
- Amrita Rao, Indian model and actress
- Amrita Rawat, Indian politician, sister-in law of Prem Rawat
- Amrita Sawaram, Indo-Mauritian badminton player
- Amrita Sher-Gil, Indian painter
- Amrita Shinde, Indian cricketer
- Amrita Singh, Indian actress
- Amrita Thapa, Nepali politician
- Amrita Thapar, Indian model
- Amrita Virk, Indian musician
- Amritha Aiyer, Indian actress
- Amritha Ram, Indian costume designer

== Other uses ==
- Amrita TV, Indian TV channel broadcasting in Malayalam, owned by Mata Amritanandamayi
- Amrita Island, Bourne, Massachusetts, US
- Amrita Bazar Patrika, defunct Indian newspaper
- Amrita Club, United States historic place
- Amrita movement, Indian Hindu movement of Mata Amritanandamayi
- Amritha Express, an overnight express train of the Indian Railways
- Amritha Kalyani, a rāga in Carnatic music

== See also ==
- Amrit (disambiguation)
- Amrut (disambiguation)
- Amrutham (disambiguation)
