= List of zamindari estates in the Godavari district =

Godavari District was a district of the Madras Presidency. It has a glorious past. Which once saw the glory of many zamindari estates and also huge estates like Peddapuram, Pithapuram, Kota Ramchandrapuram, Polvaram etc. each comprising 372, 128, 66, 128 respectively. It later got bifurcated into East and West Godavari in 1925. But before that these districts compressed few Zamindaries and their histories.

== Zamindari System in Godavari District ==
Godavari District was renamed. Originally it was Rajahmundry District having the capital of the same name but renamed in 1859. This Rajahmundry District was once ruled by

- Eastern Chalukyas
- Kakatiyas
- Gajapathi Rulers
- Vijayanagar Rulers
- Nizam Rule
- French
- Again under the Nawab who is the Subedar of Nizam
- British

During the British (1765-1947) reign in Godavarai District (originally northern circars were acquired by the British in the Anglo-French wars in 1759 but again appointed the Nawab by Nizam which finally came to British hand in the year 1765) they acquired all the local poligars and in the Battle of Padmanabham they reduced the erstwhile Princely State of Vizianagaram to a Zamindari and made permanent settlement with them in 1802. From then the powers of old Zamindars were limited and acted as revenue collector between the government and ryots.

== Zamindari Estates after the Permanent Settlement to 1843 ==
During the Permanenent settlement in 1802–03, few estates like Mogalutur and Korukonda were annexed into the government due to arrears and they were split into 26 Proprietary estates . By that time there are 15 ancient Zamindaries Like Peddapuram, Pithapuram, Polavaram, Kota Ramchandrapuram, Vegayammapeta, Velampalem, Venakayapalem, Vella, Telikacherla, Jalimudi, Panangipalli, Undeswarapuram, Mukkamala, Vilasa and Janupalli, Bantumilli. Besides these are there three other Mansabdari Estates, like Rampah, Totapalli, Jaddangi.

== Zamindari Estates after 1843 ==
Many Zamindari estates were later annexed in the government due to the arrears and lost most of their villages. Then they divided the estates further and sold to other proprietors. The details were collected by Henry Morris and wrote in the Book, A descriptive and historical account of the Godavery District in the presidency of Madras Page No:371-375.

List of Zamindaris in Godavari District in the year 1874-75
Zamindari	Holder	Peskash
Godavary district
Pittapore		3,41,627
Polavaram		43,210
Osuri Navarasapuram Estate		align
Kolanka		14350
Tuni		26429
Annavarapupeta		3895
Kapileswarapuram		8765
Undeswarapuram		630
Kotipally		Peskash in the Vizianagaram Zamindari
Uppada and Aminbada		673
Nidadavolu and Barhajhally		1,19,346
Ambarapet		16,097
Vegayammapeta Estate		8362
Tangellmudi		5143
Bhimolu		3031
Anumullanka		611
Singanagudem		46
Vilasa		1440
Janupalle		218
Jalimudi		277
Telikicherla		962
Gundepalli|		962
Panangipalli		737
Sirasavilli Savaram		300
Bantumilli|		200
Mukkamala		107
Jaggampet		33,072
Dontamuru		3248
Rayavaram		1998
Viravaram		26876
Palivela		19,240
Kirlampudi		23,382
Gopalapuram		18,540
Elamanchili		8,823
Chinchinada		1647
China Mamidipalli		255
Neredumilli		445
Vardhanani		532
Dhumantigudem		142
Gollaprolu		11,567
Kesanakuru		11,574
Vasantavada		7,349
Narayanapuram		2,948
Malakacherla		1,495
Daddipudi		378
Gutala		6,749
Mungondapalem		545
Chidipi		1,671
Peddeham		2,628
Tirugudumetta		1,856
Injeram		3,217
Pattesam		2,282
Prakkilanka|		1,822
Vangalapudi		3,817
Viravillipalem		3,534
Nadavapalli		3,129
Tyajampudi		2,791
Kurukuru		1,482
Billumilli		1,619
Lakkavaram		2,643
Jangareddigudem		499
Dharmavaram		2402
Krapa		2,385
Malakapalli		2,282
Katavaram		2,135
Yadavolu		2,161
Konitivada		2,004
Borrampalem		1,038
Vegavaram		787
Gavuripatnam		1,853
Murumanda		1,850
Anatavaram		1,763
Magam		1,746
Yernagudem		1,725
Vunkaramilli alias Ravimetta		1,630
Kalavalapalli		1346
Pativala Gurajanapalli		1,296
Mallavaram		947
Johurullabada alias Hukumpeta		1,401
Buchampeta		738
Gangolu		1,264
Vella		1,240
Bayyanagudem		1,006
Potukurru		210
Bommuru		853
Guttinadeevi		776
Kondagudem		753
Petta		583
Viravaram		554
Dandangi		551
Surasaniyanam		529
Nilapalli		479
Nandigudem		390
Nallamillipadu		203
Gavaravaram		145
jagannadhapuram		117
Pydimetta		110
Vadlapattanam		86
Tirumanagudem		64
Mansubdari of Godavari district
Thotapalle Estate		6,310
Bhadrachalam and Rekapalle		21,090
Rampah		.....
Source:Morris, Henry (1878). A descriptive and historical account of the Godavery District in the presidency of Madras. Government of Madras. pp. 371–375.

The same has been mentioned in the book Standing Information regarding the Official Administration of Madras Presidency.

== Zamindari Estates after 1920 ==
Later, these estates were further divided (impartiable estates weren't divided though). The list of it has been given in The Asylum Press Almanack And Directory Of Madras And Southern India 1924, Page No: 274–276.
