= Amrutanjan =

Amrutanjan may refer to:

- Amrutanjan (balm), a pain-relieving balm
- Amrutanjan Healthcare, an Indian pharmaceutical company, established in 1893, which manufactures it

== See also ==
- Amrut (disambiguation)
