= A. Mallavaram =

- village
- Interactive map of A. Mallavaram
- Location in Andhra Pradesh, India A. Mallavaram (India)
- Coordinates: 17.3811°N 82.3763°E
- Country: India
- State: Andhra Pradesh
- District: Kakinada

Population (2011)
  - Total: 2,833

Languages
  - Official: Telugu
- Time zone: UTC+5:30 (IST)
- Postal code: 533 446

A. Mallavaram is a village in Kakinada district in the state of Andhra Pradesh in India.

== Geography ==
A.Mallavaram is located at 17.3811°N 82.3763°E. It is located on the left side of Yeleru Left main canal.

== Demographics ==
As of Census 2011, A. Mallavaram has a population of 2833 of which 1672 were males while 1161 were females, sex ratio is 694. The population of children (age 0–6) was 247 which makes up 8.72% of total population of village. The literacy rate of the village was 56.42%.

== History ==
A.Mallavaram group of villages formed a part of the former peddapuram zamindari comprising nearly 585 villages including the mokhasa of Thotapalle Estate and Jaddangi estate. In these nearly 103 villages were given to Sri Rajah Yenumula Bapam Dora, the former Dewan of the huge Peddapuram samsthanam. Later due they were to provide the zamindar Military tenure proving him 700 poens when called for and this got the name "Mansabdar. Later in 1859 the military tenure was assumed by government and paid the amount for that. Later this Unpartiable Raj underwent few tragedies and suits were filed for the rightful owner of the Estate. In 1843 when Peddapuram Zamindari was assumed by the government for arrears, Thotapalle Estate was dcelared an Unenfranchised Inam and Unpartiable Estate. Later the owner went to arrears and the Estate was resumed by the government whereas 37 villages were Sub-Divided to the Inferior Mokhasas and were given to the Clan of Sri Rajah Yenumula Chengu Dora, the younger brother of Sri Rajah Yenumula Bapam Dora. 14 other villages including Namagiri Narendrapatnam, Balarampuram, Mallavaram etc. were given to Sri Allam Padalu families. In which 7 villages that come under Mallavaram group were under the rule of Sri Allam Sanyasi Padalu who gave it again in general power of attorney to Sri Rajah Yenumula Satyanarayana Murthy Dora ( belonging to the clan of Chengu Dora). Allam family hold matrimonial relationships with Yenumula family. They also have relationships with Sureddy family, Rekapalle Estate Zamindars and also Vogeti Zamindars and many other huge Mokhasadars and Zamindars.
