= Sribagh Pact =

1937 Indian political agreement

Sribagh Pact is an Indian agreement between the political leaders of Coastal Andhra and Rayalaseema regions during the separate Andhra on 16 November 1937. Historically, the Sribagh Agreement has been an important subject matter to the people of the Rayalaseema region regarding developmental issues due to the attitude of the then-Andhra leaders.

== History and background ==
Since the takeover of South India by the British in the late 18th century, many Telugu-speaking regions had been merged with Madras State.

=== Andhra University ===
The controversy over the headquarters of the Andhra University had created differences between the people of Rayalaseema and the coastal Circar districts.

Andhra University was inaugurated on 26 April 1926, with headquarters at Bezawada. However, the question of the center and the location of the headquarters created problems. Soon after the inauguration, the university syndicate sent a proposal to the Madras government to have a fourth center at Bezawada. The Department of Education opposed it on financial grounds. The University chose to move a center from Rajahmundry to Bezawada. The people of Rajahmundry wanted headquarters in exchange. Amid the conflict between the two cities, Waltair was selected as the university headquarters in 1929.

At this stage, the People of Rayalaseema, who were educationally more backward than the Circar districts, wanted the headquarters of the University to be situated in their region. Andhra Mahasabha, held in Anantapur in 1927, resolved that the headquarters of the University should be shifted to Anantapur. The senate of the Andhra University resolved by 35 to 20 to make Anantapur the headquarters of the University.

The Madras government did not accept the committee's recommendations or the University's senate. The government not only shifted headquarters from Bezawada to Vizag but also re-affiliated all existing colleges in Rayalaseema to the Madras University jurisdiction.

=== Rayalaseema Mahasabha ===
An organization known as Rayalaseema Mahasabha was formed in 1934 by Justices like C.L. Narasimha Reddy and K. Subrahmanyam to safeguard the interests of Rayalaseema and stay within Madras University's jurisdiction.

The first session of the Rayalaseema Mahasabha was held at Madras on 28 January 1934. It was presided over by Nemali Pattabhirama Rao of Cuddapah. S. Satyamurti, a Tamil leader against separate Andhra sentiment, inaugurated it. The conference opposed the attempts made by the coastal districts' congress legislators to extend the Andhra University's jurisdiction over Rayalaseema. It demanded the creation of Sri Venkateswara University at Tirupati. The second conference session was held at Cuddapah in the first week of September 1935. Important Congress leaders of Rayalaseema, like K. Koti Reddi, G. Harisarvothama Rao, and P. Ramachari, did not attend any sessions.

The leaders of the Rayalaseema Mahasabha, like C. L. Narasimha Reddy and Subrahmanyam, were defeated by Congress candidates in the 1937 Madras legislative assembly and council elections. The organisation failed to make a political impact but continued to oppose the formation of Andhra province till the end.

=== Andhra Congress ===
The Congress party won the 1937 elections in Madras state under the leadership of C. Rajagopalachari. His cabinet included Tanguturi Prakasam, Bezawada Gopala Reddy, and V. V. Giri from coastal Andhra. His government comprised 24 jobs with 10 ministers, 10 parliamentary secretaries, a speaker, and a deputy secretary. None from Rayalaseema are considered. The Rayalaseema congress leaders felt they were let down by the Circars leaders and insisted on including the Rayalaseema representatives in the cabinet.

Soon after the elections, the Andhras intensified the movement for a separate Andhra province. Dr. Pattabhi Sitaramayya became the President of the Andhra Province Congress Committee in August 1937. G. Brahmayya, Bulusu Sambamurthy, and other leaders increased their efforts to secure the province. The leaders of the Circars realized the need to enlist Rayalaseema's cooperation to satisfy the demand for a separate Andhra province. But Rayalaseema leaders were not ready to go hand in hand with coastal leaders, as they had doubts about their region's development due to the attitude of Andhra leaders in taking out the Andhra University and other reasons.

The Silver Jubilee session of the Andhra Mahasabha was held at Vijayawada in October 1937. It was inaugurated by Halaharvi Sitarama Reddi and presided over by Kadapa Koti Reddi, both congress legislators from Rayalaseema. They appealed to the Circar leaders to win back the confidence of Rayalaseema by providing safeguards to the region.

== Sribagh Meeting ==
On 16 November 1937, the leaders of both regions sat for an agreement in Sribagh, the house of Kashinathuni Nageshwara Rao, a well-known media owner and founder of Andhra Patrika and Amrutanjan. The committee discussed the conditions to be fulfilled if Rayalaseema should co-operate with the Coastal districts in the demand for an Andhra Province. This agreement came to be known as the Sribagh Pact or Sribagh Agreement.

=== Members ===
Leader	Region
Kotireddigari Koti Reddy	Kadapa district
Kallur Subba Rao	Anantpur district
L. Subbarami Reddy	Nellore
Bhogaraju Pattabhi Sitaramayya	Krishna district
Konda Venkatappaiah	Guntur district
Pappuri Ramacharyulu	Anantapur district
R.Venkatappa Naidu	Nellore
H.Seetharama Reddy	Kurnool

=== The agreement ===
This was an agreement to develop the Rayalaseema region at par with coastal areas and to bring consensus among all the regions before the formation of Andhra province.

The main points of the pact were:

  - University: Two University Centers are to be developed under the Andhra University, one at Vizag and another at Anantapur, to distribute the centers of culture over the Andhra province, create opportunities for social and cultural intercourse amongst the Andhras and locate colleges in areas favorable to the subjects dealt with.
  - Irrigation: The rapid development of the agricultural and economic interests of Rayalaseema and Nellore shall be done to the level of those in the Coastal districts. Regarding utilizing the waters of Tungabhadra, Krishna, and Pennar, ten years of exclusive attention shall be given to major projects beneficial to Rayalaseema. Whenever the question of sharing waters arises, the needs of the Rayalaseema are to be first met.
  - Legislature: Regarding general seats in the Legislature, the distribution shall be generally on an equal district basis.
  - Decentralization: The location of the University, the Headquarters, and the High Court shall be in different regions. While the University may continue to be where it is, the High Court and Metropolis are to be located in suitable places in the Coastal districts and Rayalaseema, and the choice shall be given to Rayalaseema.
  - It shall, however, be open to vary these terms by common consent.

=== Results ===
At last, Rayalaseema joined in the Andhra University. A memorandum was submitted to the Assembly of Madras regarding the separate Andhra province and was forwarded to the Government of India on 21 April 1938. The Secretary of State for India declared that the Government was not interested in creating any new state.

After Potti Sreeramulu's martyrdom, India's government agreed to form linguistic-based states, including the Andhra state. Jawaharlal Nehru wanted the capital issue settled before announcing the separate state for Andhras. A meeting of the Andhra Area leaders took place under the leadership of Tanguturi Prakasam at Madras. Gouthu Latchanna from Srikakulam proposed the location of the capital at Tirupati in adherence to the Sribhah pact. The Communists proposed Vijayawada to the Guntur area for the location of the capital city. No consensus could be reached, and the final decision was left to the Tanguturi Prakasam, who proposed Kurnool as the capital. The High Court is located at Guntur.

On October 1, 1953, a new Andhra State was formed with Kurnool as the capital under the terms of the Sribagh pact. After the formation of the Andhra Pradesh State in 1956, both the capital city and high court moved to Hyderabad, Telangana.

== Gentlemen's Agreement ==
People may confuse the Sri Bagh and Gentleman's agreement. While Sri Bhag agreement is between Coastal Andhra and Rayalaseema leaders, the Gentlemen's Agreement is between Andhra and Telangana leaders. In 1956, when the states were reorganised based on language, Telugu-speaking areas of Hyderabad state were proposed to merge with Andhra state. Hyderabad state leaders had apprehensions about this merger, so the Gentleman's Agreement was signed by state leaders of Hyderabad and Andhra states on Feb 20th, 1956, at Hyderabad House in New Delhi under the scope of Prime Minister Jawaharlal Nehru to safeguard the rights of Telangana region.
