= Amrit (disambiguation) =

Amrit was an ancient Phoenician city located near Tartus in Syria.

Amrit may also refer to:

- Amrit, Egypt, a village in Abou Hammaad, Sharqia Governorate
- Amrit, a 1941 Indian Black-and-white film
- Amrit, a 1986 Indian Hindi film
- Amrit (album), a 1992 album by Nusrat Hussain
- Amrita, name for objects, ceremonies, people, etc. stemming from ancient India
  - Amrit Sanskar, the Sikh ceremony of initiation or baptism
  - Amrita, the elixir of life in Indian religions

== People with the given name ==
- Amrit Abhijat
- Amrit Bhattarai
- Amrit Bhushan Dev Adhikari
- Amrit Desai
- Amrit Gangar
- Amrit Kaur (politician)
- Amrit Kaur of Mandi
- Amrit Kaur (actress)
- Amrit Keshav Nayak
- Amrit Kumar Bohara
- Amrit Lal (1940s Southern Punjab cricketer)
- Amrit Lal (1960s Southern Punjab cricketer)
- Amrit Lugun
- Amrit Maan
- Amrit Maghera
- Amrit Mahal
- Amrit Mangat
- Amrit Manthan
- Amrit Nahata
- Amrit Pal (athlete)
- Amrit Pal (actor)
- Amrit Patel
- Amrit Pritam
- Amrit Rai
- Amrit Sagar
- Amrit Sanchar
- Amrit Singh (cyclist)
- Amrit Tewari
- Amrit Velā
- Amrit Wilson

== See also ==
- Amrita (disambiguation)
