= Kanchumarthi Ramachandra Rao =

Raja Kanchumarthi Ramachandra Rao
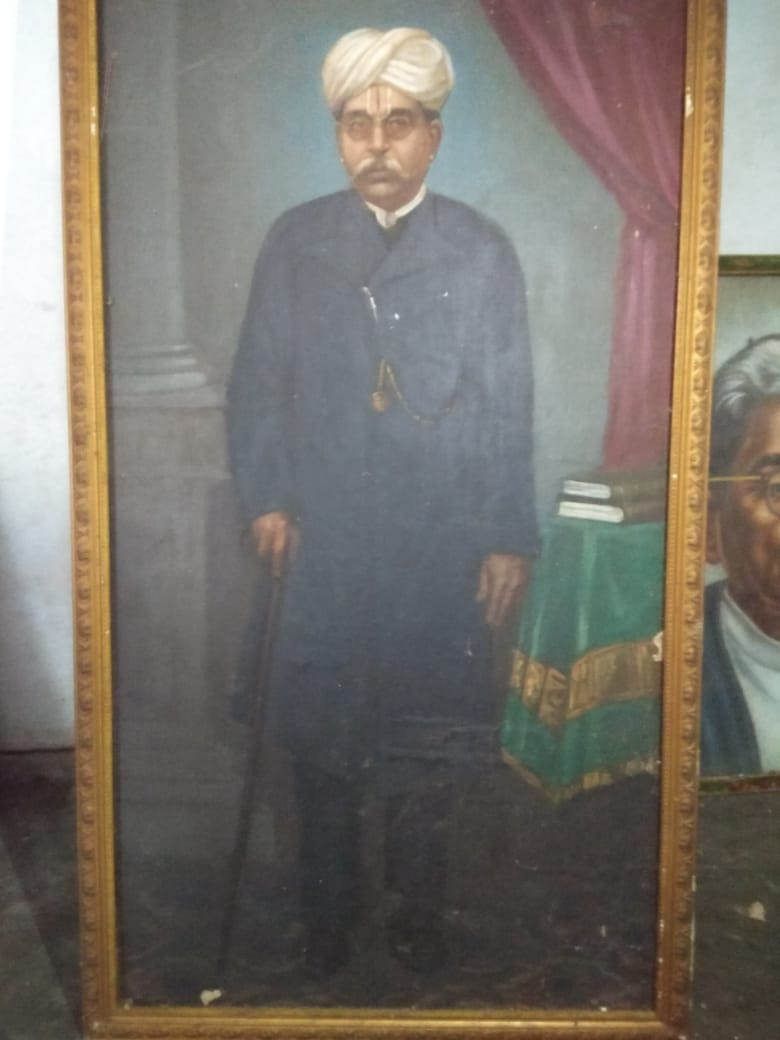
- Born: 12 October 1870; Rajahmundry, Madras Presidency
- Died: 6 June 1926 (aged 55); Rajahmundry, Andhra Pradesh, India
- Occupations: Zamindar, Municipal Councillor. etc
- Spouse: Kanchumarthi Venkata Ramanamma
- Children: 5
- Parent: Kanchumarthi Narasayya Naidu
- Relatives: Raja Vogeti Ramakrishnayya

Raja Kanchumarthi Ramachandra Rao was a zamindar of Dharmavaram. He is notable for the development of Rajamahendravaram. He was the son of Kanchumarthi Narasayya Naidu.

== Personal life ==
Kanchumarthi Venkata Seetha Ramachandra Rao is the adopted son of Kanchumarthi Narasayya Nadiu from his wife's brother. Kanchumarthi Venkata Seetha Ramachandra Rao comes from a respectable Telaga family of Rajamahendravaram. When his adoptive father died in his very young age his estate was managed by his uncle Raja Vogeti Ramakrishnayya Naidu. He was assumed to take back his property in year 1890. He was the childhood friend of Tanguturi Prakasam. He was also one of the first trustee board member of Rajahmundry town hall started by Kandukuri Veeresalingam.

== Political life ==
Even from the childhood Ramachandra Rao was very interested in politics and starting businesses. His uncle Vogeti Ramakrishnayya Naidu at that time used to have 16 businesses. By seeing him Ramachandra Rao, even though being the average student attracted towards industry culture and later he had spent some amount on it. He was elected to Rajahmundry municipal council for two terms. Later he entered in Justice party. He was said to be the legacy carrier of Vogeti Ramakrishnayya Naidu who played important role in politics. He is also the trustee for Korukonda Devasthanam and also a nominee for Diwan Bahadur.

== Social works ==
He donated a lot for social works. He was one of the main reason for the development of Gowthami Grandhalayam. He also participated in the Freedom struggle. He is also the main person in the tour of Bipin Chandra Pal trip to India.In 1921, he erected a women empowerment building in honor of his daughter, Babayamma, who was among the first women to successfully complete matriculation in Rajamahendravaram.

== Death ==
He died in the year 1926.

== Hierarchy ==
He had three sons; Kanchumarthi Parthasaradhi, Kanchumarthi Venakata Sita Ramarao, Kanchumarthi Venkata Subbarao (vaachi).

== History ==
The ancestors of them were the senathipathis and samantharajas of the Vijayanagar dynasty. They never wanted a zamindari till 1784 when nuzvid zamindar Meka apparao naidu lost his zamindari in Rajahmundry. Later in 1794 it was changed to collectorate when Vogeti Apparao Naidu was given other estates to rule. Their zamindari was considered to be one of the oldest Zamindaris in Madras Presidency. these meraka veedhi telagas have prominent role in history and politics.

== Meraka Veedhi Telaga ==
Meraka Veedhi Telagas, once known as Chandragiri Balijas, are a sect of 20+ surnames who once served as Senathipathis and Samantharajas of Vijayanagara Empire who migrated to Rajamahendravaram after the downfall of Rama Raya of Vijayanagara and refused to rule their kingdoms under the Mughals. In 1565, they migrated to Chandragiri and later served in the Maratha armies. Finally they reached Rajamahendravaram and settled in Merakaveedhi. They served the Nawab of Rajahmundry and later served the highest native ranks in British Company Army. Later many of them became feudal landlords, Zamindars, MLAs, and MLCs. Important people from these families include Vogeti Ramakrishnayya Naidu, Pothula Veerabhadra rao, Kandula Veera Raghava Swamy Naidu, Muthangi Jaggarao, Raja Vogeti Venkata Gopala Rama Krishnam Raju. The surnames of these families include Kanchumarthi, Vogeti, Bayapuneedi, Kandula, Muthangi, Narra, Yerra, Ramineedi, Mondreti. Even now you can find swords and weapons used in 15th century are available in their houses.

== See also ==
- Tanguturi Prakasam
