= Amrut =

Amrut may refer to:

== Places ==
- Amrut, Afghanistan, a village in Kunduz Province, Afghanistan
- Amrut Nagar, a neighbourhood in the Ghatkopar suburb of Mumbai, India

== Other ==
- Amrut Distilleries, a distiller based in Bangalore, India
- Amrut (whisky), a brand of single malt whisky manufactured by Amrut Distilleries
- Amrut or Amrita, a Sanskrit word that literally means "immortality", and is often referred to in texts as nectar
- Amrut Ghayal, the pen name of Indian poet Amrutlal Laljee Bhatt
- AMRUT, a flagship scheme implemented in India

== See also ==
- Amrita (disambiguation)
- Amrutham (disambiguation)
- Amrutanjan (disambiguation)
