= Vogeti =

Vogeti or Ogeti is a Telugu surname used by a particular aristocratic family mainly based in Rajahmundry, Andhra Pradesh, India. It is one of the Merakaveedhi Telaga martial race.

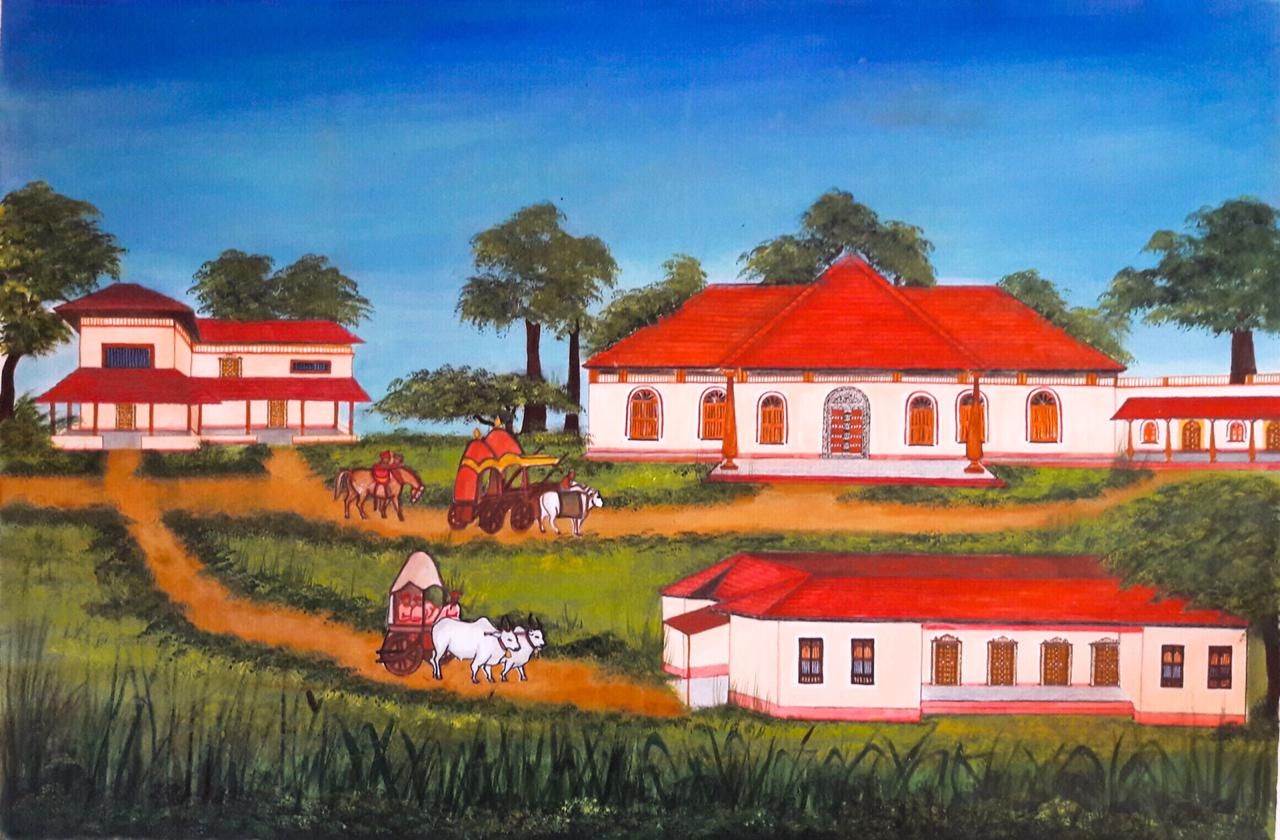
Vogeti bungalows 1830s deception in Rajahmundry, by Pooja Patnayak

== History ==
This family belongs to the Telaga or Balija caste previously serving in the armies of Vijayanagara Empire. later reached Rajahmundry occupying merakaveedhi of Rajahmundry. Holding high positions in the Madras Army. They also held huge acreages around Korukonda, Gummaldoddi, Punyakshetram, Rajahmundry, Jambupatnam etc. villages and cities. Later Guardians of courts of Dharmavaram and Kalavalapalli Zamindari estates. They also held the positions of Honorary Magistrate, Municipal Councillors of Rajahmundry and also been the Shavukars (money lenders). They started the first bus service in Rajahmundry to Gokavaram via, Korukonda with the name Godavari Bus Service in the mid-1920s.

== Hierarchy of a notable family with the surname ==
The hierarchy of the family who held the part thereof Nandiagama estate residing in Rajahmundry was given by Historian Yatagiri Sri Rama Narasimha Rao.

- Vogeti Apparao Naidu, Zamindari Landholder, Wealthy Landlord, Banker, Trader.
- Vogeti Jaggarao Naidu, Zamindari Landholder, Wealthy Landlord, Banker, Trader.
- Raja Vogeti Ramakrishnayya, Zamindar, Honorary Magistrate, Municipal Councillor, Wealthy Landlord, Banker, Trader, trustee of venugopala swamy devasthanam etc.
- Vogeti Seshagiri Rao, Zamindar of Gannavaram.
1. Raja Vogeti Venkata Gopala Ramakrishnam Raju, Zamindar of Gannavaram.
2. Vogeti Lakshmana Raju, Zamindari Landholder part thereof Nandigama Estate.
- Raja Vogeti Venkata Rama Rushi A.K.A Rushi Vogeti, Author, Animator, Research Analyst.

== Contributions ==
- The members of the family built a temple for Botlamma in Gannavaram village, and donated land for the temple.
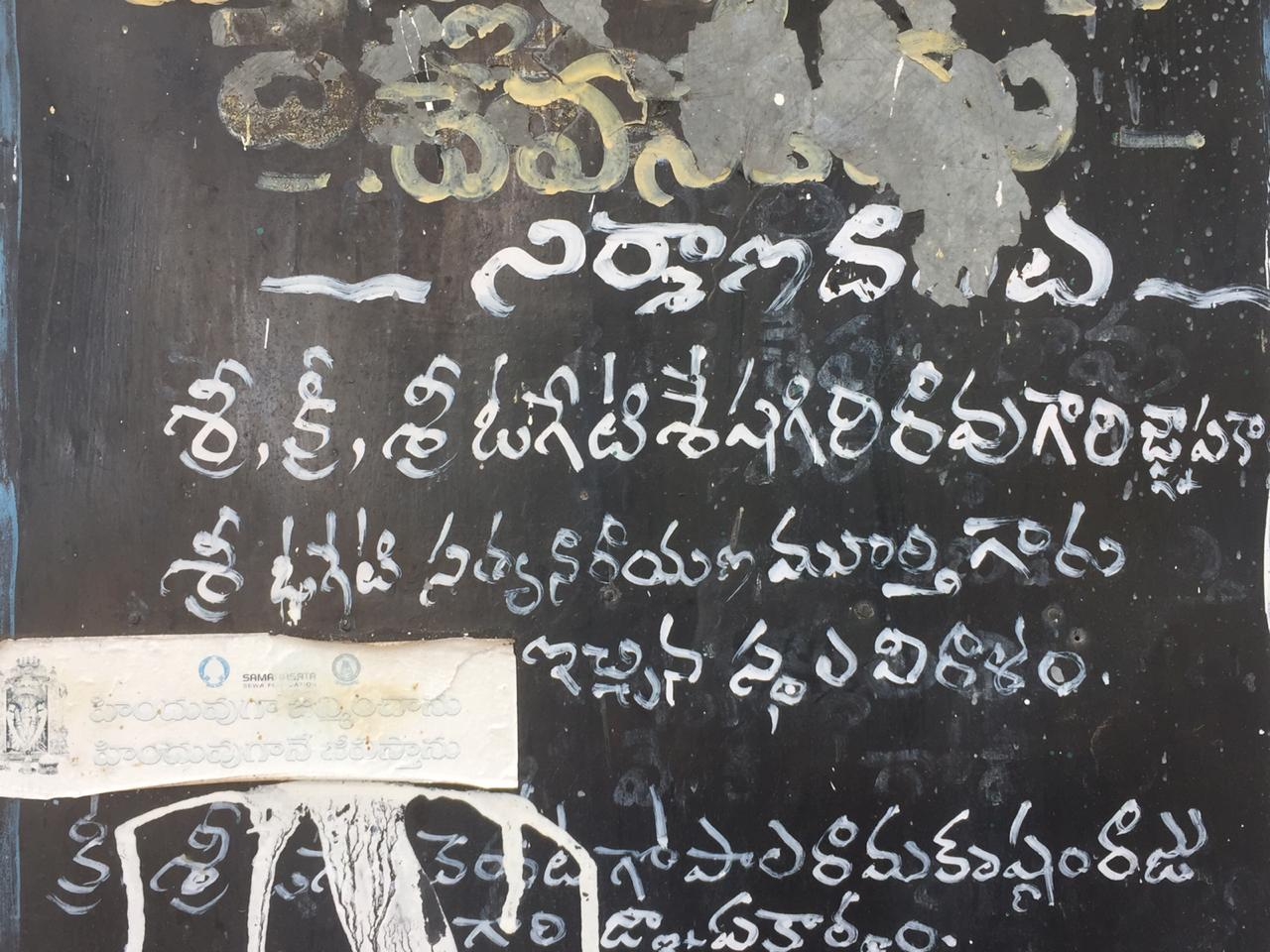
Epitome of contributors for building the Botlamma Temple, Gannavaram.

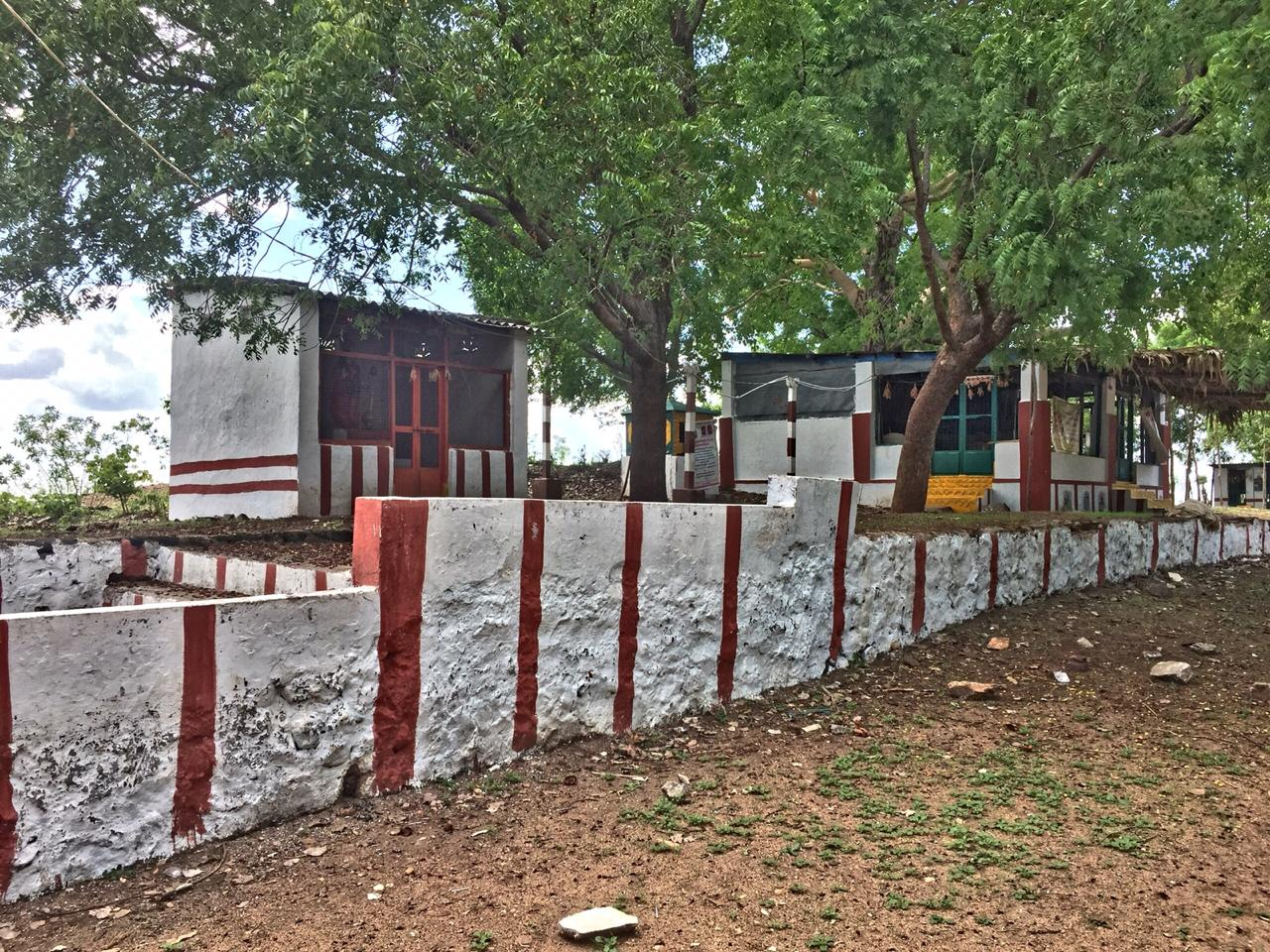
Botlamma Temple, Gannavaram.
