= S. Sambhu Prasad =

Sivalenka Sambhu Prasad
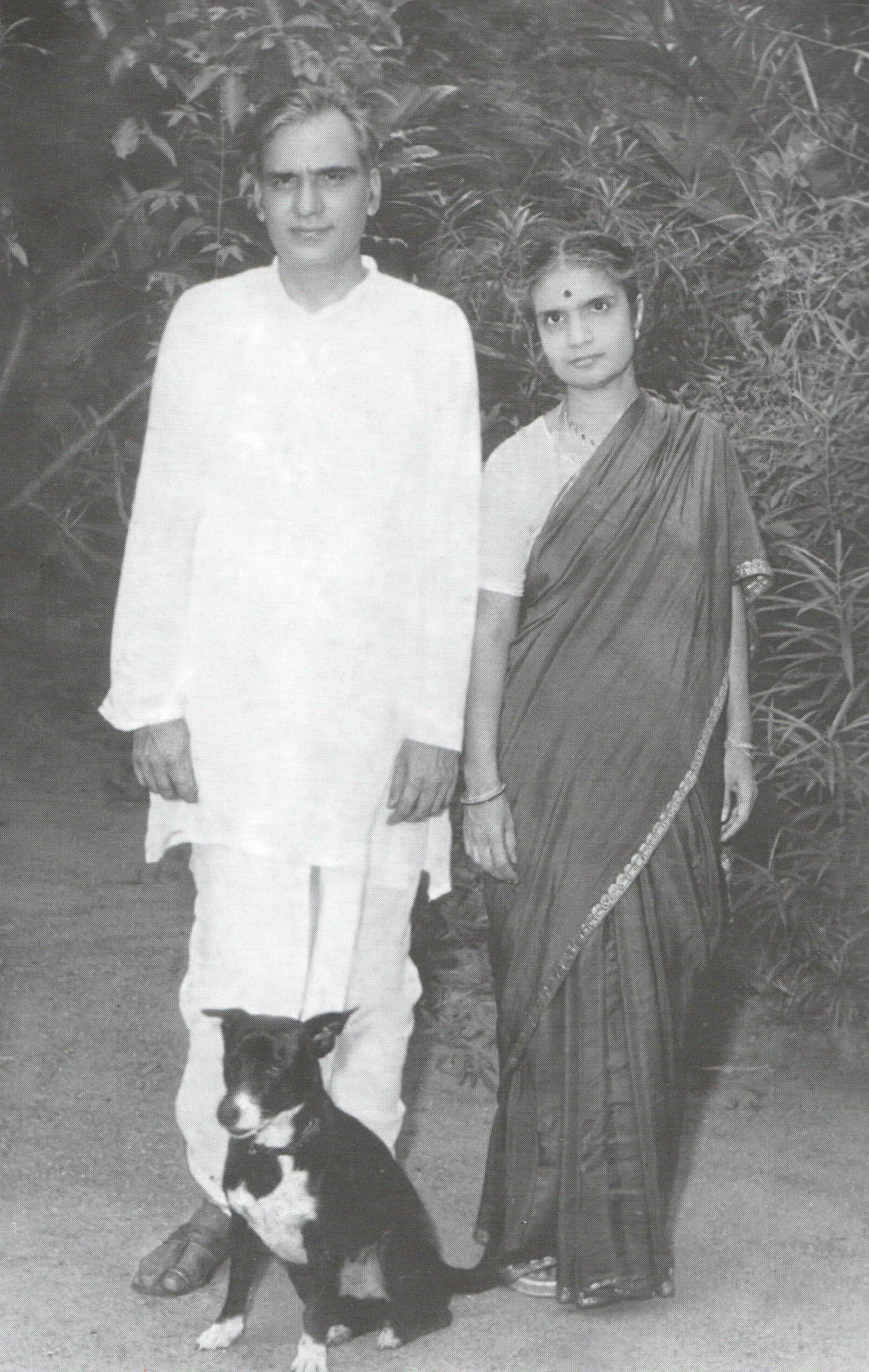
- Sivalenka Sambhu Prasad with his wife Smt Kamakshamma and their pet dog in early years
- Born: 26 January 1911; Yelakurru, Krishna District, Andhra Pradesh, India
- Died: 8 June 1972 (aged 61); Chennai, India
- Other name: Ayyavaru
- Education: Santiniketan; Viswa Bharathi University
- Occupations: Journalist, Owner of Amrtunajan Brand and Company (Pain) Balm and Andhra Patrika Group, Member of Parliament, Member of Andhra Pradesh Legislative Council
- Political party: Indian National Congress
- Spouse: Kamakshamma
- Father: S. Sivabrahmam

Sivalenka Sambhu Prasad (26 January 1911 – 8 June 1972) was a journalist and Indian National Congress politician, who took over the Daily News Paper Andhra Patrika (Daily Telugu language Newspaper), Andhra Sachitra Vara Patrika (Telugu Language Weekly Magazine) and Bharathi (Telugu Language Monthly covering classical Literature) which were published from Chennai City (then Madras) which was the capital of Composite State of Madras (Madras Presidency) from his father-in-law Kasinadhuni Nageswara Rao, the founder of Andhra Patrika group of publications in 1903, inventor of "Amrutanjan", a pain balm with natural ingredients, in 1893 and a freedom-fighter. After taking over he led the group of publications from 1938 to 1972. Rao also bequeathed all properties and Amrutanjan business to Sambhu Prasad, which he ran along with publications. During Sambhu Prasad's lifetime there were many important events in India, including the Second World War, the Independence of India, and much of the life, and the death, of Mahatma Gandhi. He was called "Ayyavaru" (Teacher and Guru) by his employees. The centenary of his birth was celebrated in 2011 by a function was attended by dignitaries and journalists, including Chief Minister of Andhra Pradesh Konijeti Rosaiah.

== Early life ==
Sambhu Prasad was born to S. Sivabrahmam in the then Madras Presidency. They are the followers of Srouta saivam. He graduated from the Viswa Bharathi University and joined the Indian independence movement. He was a member of the Indian National Congress.

== Education ==
Sivalenka Sambhuprasad graduated from the Santiniketan school founded by Rabindranath Tagore.

== Member of Parliament ==
Sambhu Prasad was elected to the Rajya Sabha in 1952 and served from 3 April 1952 to 2 April 1956. He subsequently served a term in the Legislative Council of Andhra Pradesh States.

== Personal ==
Sambhu Prasad married Kamakshamma. They had two sons and three daughters.

== Death ==
Sambhu Prasad died on Thursday 8 June 1972 at Chennai.
