= All India Management Association =

Indian statutory professional body

- Formation: 1957
- Founded at: Delhi, India
- Headquarters: New Delhi, India
- Coordinates: 28.58414°N 77.228957°E
- Website: www.aima.in

All India Management Association (AIMA) is the national apex body of the management profession in India. A not-for-profit, non-lobbying organisation, working closely with Industry, Government, Academia and students to further the cause of the management profession in India. It has a membership base of over 38000 members and close to 6000 corporate /institutional members, through its 67 Local Management Associations. It was established in 1957. Among its activities, AIMA conducts the Management Aptitude Test (MAT) for admission into Management Colleges across India, is represented in national forums and organisations and annual awards.

== History ==
AIMA was established in 1957 following the establishment of India's first industrialization policy in 1956.

== Management team ==
AIMA is managed by a president, a senior vice president, a vice president, a treasurer and a director general. As of 2023, the president is Nikhil Sawhney.

== Activities ==
AIMA conducts the Management Aptitude Test (MAT) used by over 600 business schools across India. Other tests conducted include the Research Management Aptitude Test (RMAT), Under Graduate Aptitude Test (UGAT), Accredited Management Teacher (AMT) certification and other customised tests.

AIMA is represented on various national bodies and organisations including the National Board of Accreditation (NBA), Bureau of Indian Standards (BIS) and the board of governors of various Indian Institutes of Management.

AIMA awards various annual awards. The Kewal Nohria Award for Academic Leadership in Management Education, awarded since 2009, was awarded to Bala V. Balachandran in 2018.

== Member Bodies ==
- Indian Institute of Management
- Qatar Indian Management Association
