= Polavaram Estate =

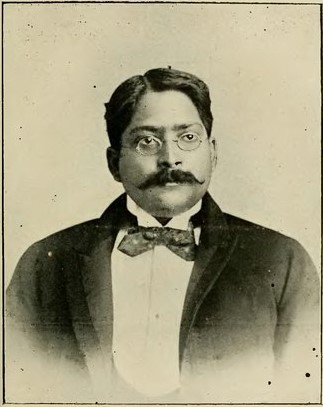
Sri Rajah K. R. V. Krishna Rao Bahadur, Zamindar of Polavaram.

Polavaram Estate is one the Zamindari estates in Godavari district under the jurisdiction of Madras Presidency. In 1905, The Estate was part of the Pólavaram division is the south-westernmost portion of the Gódávari Agency, and lies on the right bank of the river. At the permanent settlement of 1802–03 the entire division was all included in the Pólavaram estate. Only 24 of its villages are zamindari land, of which twelve belong to the so-called Pólavaram and Pattisam estates; five belong to the Gútála estate and four to the estate of Gangólu; and one village belongs to each of the muttas of Bayyanagúdem, Billumilli and Jangareddigúdem, which three form one estate.

== Zamindari Estates after the Permanent Settlement to 1843 ==
During the Permanenent settlement in 1802–03, few estates like Mogalutur and Korukonda were annexed into the government due to arrears and they were split into 26 Proprietary estates . By that time there are 15 ancient Zamindaries Like Peddapuram, Pithapuram, Polavaram, Kota Ramchandrapuram, Vegayammapeta, Velampalem, Venakayapalem, Vella, Telikacherla, Jalimudi, Panangipalli, Undeswarapuram, Mukkamala, Vilasa and Janupalli, Bantumilli. Besides these are there three other Mansabdari Estates, like Rampah, Totapalli, Jaddangi.

== Zamindari family ==
One of the members of the family, Mr. Venkata Razu, held the important and respectable post of Sheristadar in the Krishna and the Godavari Districts. He had four sons, viz., Venkatarayaningar, Ramanna Garu, Pedda Subbarayaningar, and Chinna Subbarayaningar. The family being undivided, all the brothers lived together. The father, Mr. Venkata Razu, out of the money he had laid by, bought a small estate in the Krishna District. His eldest son, Venkatarayaningar, a man of much influence and tact, acquired large estates, and in course of time his fame for charity, large heartedness, and generous instincts was spread far and wide. He constructed choultries at stated intervals from Rajahmundry, his headquarters, to Benares. In times of famine he left the tax uncollected. After Mr. Venkatarayaningar, his widow began to manage the estate. As it was a large one, and as she had no experience, she lost every thing. A cousin of Venkatarayaningar, Jagannadha Rao, owned the present Polavaram estate, Taduvoy and Jangareddy Gudiem, and Ganapavaram estates, and also the present Gutata estate. These estates were not then so flourishing as they are now, and hence they did not pay the proprietors well. The Gutata estate passed to the hands of the Shroff of Mr. Venkatarayananingar, who was a dependant of the family. A partition took place, when Jagannadah Rao, retained to himself the present Polavaram estate and gave away Jangareddy Gudiem and Taduva estates to Pedda Subbarayaningar, and the Ganapavaram estate to Ramanna Garu. Jagannadha Rao had a son, named Ramachandra Venkata Krishna Rao, who had a son, named Venkata Jagannadha Rao, and also a daughter. Venkata Jagannadha Rao died at the comparatively early age of 25, leaving behind him a young widow, Kamayamma, and gave her the option of adopting a son of her own choice. She adopted her sister's son Mr. Krishna Rao. Mr. Pedda Nagaraja Rao Garu was the great-grandfather of Mr. Krishna Rao, and enjoyed the honor and privilege of being the leader of the Bar in the Provincial Court at Masulipatam. He was known to be of very high legal attainments, a great Sanskritist, and a renowned poet in Sanskrit and Telugu. He is the author of Sakuntala-praniam in Telugu, and of several commentaries on Sanskrit books. Kamayamma Garu, the adoptive mother of Krishna Rao, was universally known for her virtue and charity.
