= Puripanda Appala Swamy =

Indian writer, translator and journalist (1904–1982)

Puripanda Appalaswamy
- Born: 13 November 1904 Salur, Vizianagaram district
- Died: 18 November 1982 (aged 78)
- Occupation: writer, journalist

Puripanda Appala Swamy (1904–1982), also spelled Appalaswamy, was a linguist, writer, translator, journalist and editor.

== Early life ==
He was born in Salur, Vizianagaram district on 13 November 1904. After primary education, he learned Telugu, Sanskrit and many other languages including Oriya, Hindi, Bengali and English.

== Life ==
He actively participated in Indian Freedom Movement particularly Non-cooperative movement, Harijan upliftment and Khadi Prachar movement. He worked as organizer in All India Charaka Sangham at Visakhapatnam.

He has distinguished skill in the field of journalism. He has worked as associate editor for 'Swasakti', a national newspaper. He used to write articles for 12 years in Andhra Patrika as freelance journalist. He has organized 'Satyavani' magazine with very informative editorials. He published 'Vaisakhi', a monthly magazine with a praise from literary populace.

The credit of discovering the Mahakavi Sri Sri should go to Puripanda.

He was actively involved in the Library Movement in Andhra Pradesh. He has developed libraries in Sriramavaram, Parvathipuram and established a library in Marakam. He was life member of Andhra Pradesh Library Society.

He was president of Visakha Writers Association and member of Andhra Pradesh Lalit Kala Akademi and Sahitya Akademi. He was awarded Kalaprapoorna by Andhra University in 1973 for his contributions to Indian literature.

== Honour ==
His statue was erected in Visakhapatnam on the beach road. Brief biographic book was written by Dwana Sastry and Bandi Satyanarayana and released on the occasion.

== Literary works ==
- Mahabharatam
- Sridevi Bhagavatam
- Srimadbhagavatam (1979)
- Valmiki Ramayanam
- Oriya Sahitya Caritra
- Historyof Bengali Literature
- Ratna Patakam
- Mohammad Charitra
- Soudamini
- Oriya Songs
- Jagadguru Shankaracharya
- Vishwa Kala Veedhi
- Hangary Viplavam
- Amrutha Santanam (translation)
- Matti Manushulu (translation)
