= Gowthami Grandhalayam =

Indian regional library

Sri Gowthami Regional Library
- Gowthami Grandhalayam
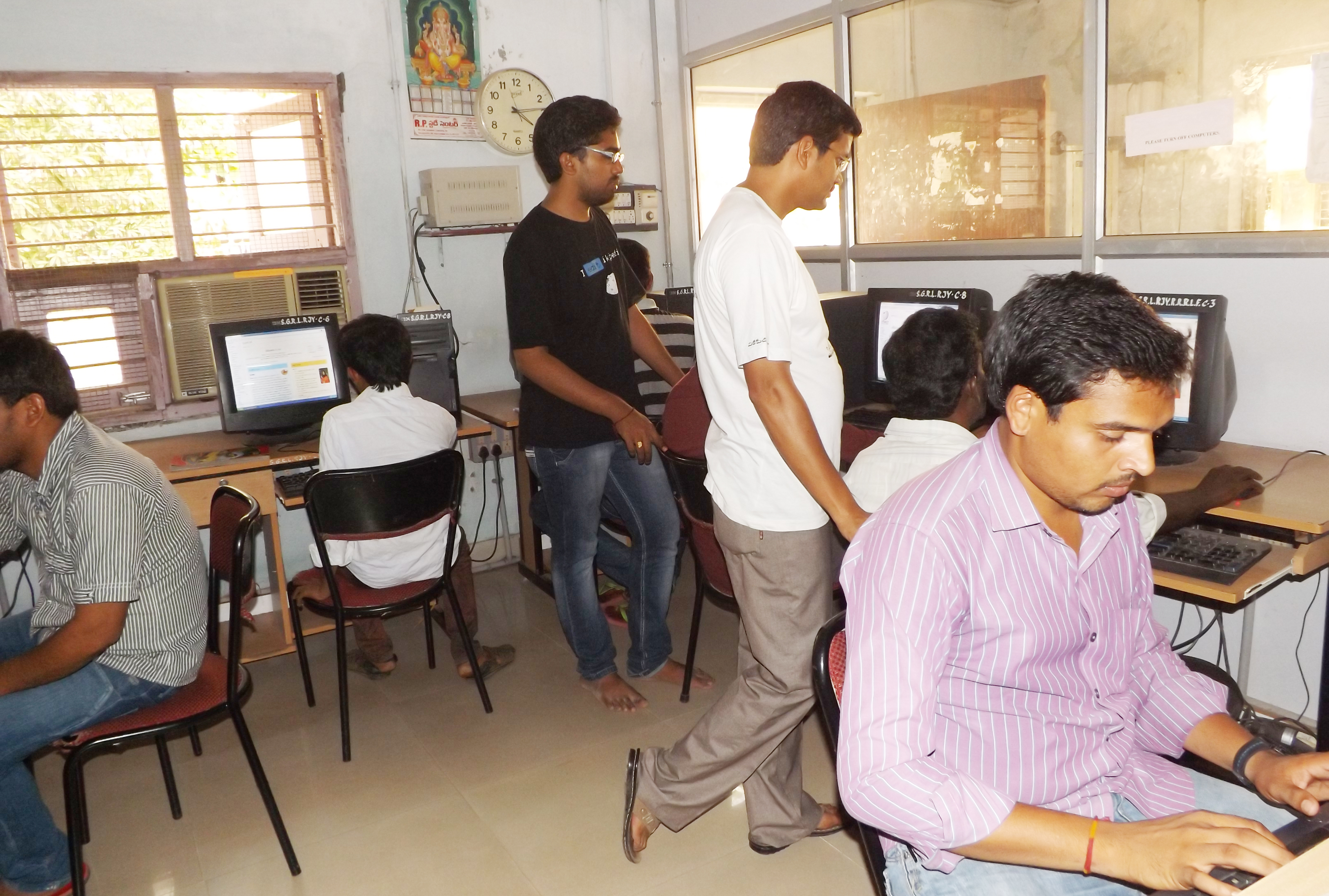
- A training program by Wikipedians at the library
- 17.009298914840837°N 81.774203049487°E
- Location: Rajamahendravaram, Andhra Pradesh, India
- Established: 1898
- Reference to legal mandate: Societies Registration Act, 1920

Collection
- Size: 1.03 lakh

Gowthami Grandhalayam or Sri Gowthami Regional Library was started by poet and social reformer Nalam Krishna Rao in 1898 in Rajamahendravaram, Andhra Pradesh, India.

== History ==
Initially named Sri Veeresalingam library, since it was backed by the nationalist Kandukuri Veeresalingam Pantulu, it was housed in Nalam Choultry in Innispeta with a very small collection.

Around the same time Addanki Satyanarayana established the Vasuraya Library.

Andhra Desa Grandhalaya Sangham secretary Pathuri Nageswara Rao suggested merger of the two libraries to get regional status.

Following the advice of the elite in the city, the two libraries were merged and named as Gowthami Grandhalayam and registered under the Societies Registration Act, 1920. Vavilala Gopala Krishnaiah and AB Nageswara Rao were successful in getting regional status to the library. In 1979, the government took over the library. With the increase in collections the library moved to the Town Hall in Rajahmundry.

The library enjoyed the patronage of persons like Maharaja Vikram Deo Verma of Jeypore State, Raja Kanchumarthi Ramachandra Rao of Dharmavaram Estate, Chilakamarti Lakshmi Narasimham, Bhamidipati Kameswara Rao, Kasinathuni Nageswara Rao, Cattamanchi Ramalinga Reddy and Pathuri Nagabhushanam. It had the reputation of quenching the literary thirst of people from foreign origin as well.

== Efforts ==
Later land was bought at Lakshmivarapupeta and a rich landlord Kanchumarti Seetaramachandra Rao constructed a building in memory of his daughter Babayamma (one of the first women to complete matriculation in Rajahmundry) who died young. The Babayamma Hall, served as the library building until the 1970s and still exists, behind the new building. Kanchumarti Babayamma is the first woman Municipal Councillor of Rajahmundry.

With a good collection of both Telugu and English classics, including old editions of Shakespeare, the library was first managed by a committee elected by select lifetime members.

Mahidhar Jaganmohan Rao was the last secretary of the library under the committee.

== Some of the rare books and manuscripts ==
- Books from the 12th century
- First 1771 published copy of the Encyclopædia Britannica
- Col. Mackenzie (Telugu) manuscripts
- The 100 volumes of Gandhi’s words
- Writings on revolutionary Alluri Sitaramaraju at the IIC
- Silver coated stylus for writing on palm leaves
- Copper plates
- Palm leaf manuscripts
- 15,000 rare books. Of them, 1,500 books were published prior to 1900, around 8,115 books by 1923 and 5,000 books up to 1950.

== Collection ==
As of 2020, the library holds 1.10 lakh books, including 71,130 of Telugu, 21,974 of English, 7,967 of Hindi, 372 Urdu books, 667 other books, 411 palm leaf manuscripts, six copper plates and 40 unpublished manuscripts.

After the Tanjavur library in Tamil Nadu, the biggest in the region is Sri Gowthami Regional Library. By mid-2019, the construction of a new library building is scheduled to be completed.
