= Andhra Patrika =

Indian Telugu-language newspaper (1908–1991)

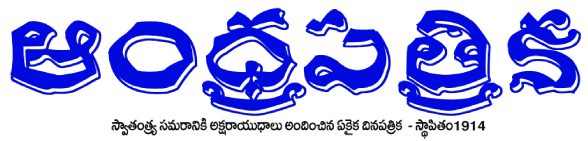
- Type: Daily newspaper
- Owner: Andhra Patrika Group
- Founder: Kasinathuni Nageswara Rao
- Editor: Kancharla Ramaiah
- Founded: 1908
- Ceased publication: 1991
- Headquarters: Vijayawada
- Website: https://epaper.andhrapatrikaa.com/

Andhra Patrika was an Indian Telugu-language newspaper founded by Kasinathuni Nageswara Rao on 9 September 1908. It was initially a weekly publication and later transformed into a daily newspaper. It played an influential role in India’s nationalist movement. The newspaper had a lasting impact on the development of modern Telugu language and was instrumental in shaping the cultural and political identity that contributed to the creation of Andhra Pradesh. Andhra Patrika continued publication until it closed in 1991.

== History ==
Kasinathuni Nageswara Rao founded the weekly as he recognized the need for a Telugu language journal to campaign effectively for the Indian freedom struggle and founded the weekly, and the newspaper wandered all over the territories in which the Telugu language was spoken. Rao moved the newspaper to Madras in 1914 to get closer to Telugus, and after a few years turned it into the first enduring daily in Telugu.

Gaining a reputation even among the British as the most efficiently managed Telugu newspaper, it backed the Gandhian nationalist movement from 1920, and Nageswara Rao served as president and treasurer of the Andhra Pradesh Congress Committee, the chief organizational body of the national movement in the Telugu areas. According to a British official, Andhra Patrika became "the most evil influence in the Telugu country". Dubbed "Viswa Datha" ("donor to the world"), Nageswara Rao put money and effort into his newspaper. He introduced good quality news photos from 1928 and is said to have distributed 800 copies of the paper free to village libraries. In 1931, in the heat of the civil-disobedience movement against the British, Andhra Patrika's circulation reached 10,000.

At the time of Indian independence, it was the largest, best- known Telugu daily. Its proprietors joined forces with others like them from around India when they joined the Audit Bureau of Circulations formed in 1948. The ABC was intended to certify and guarantee circulation figures and thereby reassure and encourage advertisers. Andhra Patrika was the 33rd member, not far behind major English-language dailies like the Hindu of Madras (No 16) and ahead of the Statesman of Calcutta (No 57).

== Decline of the Journal ==
Andhra Patrika published only from Madras city until about 1969 when it started an edition from Vijayawada and established an office in New Delhi under the leadership of T. V. Krishna. Ten years earlier, it had been passed in circulation by Andhra Prabha, which was published from towns inside Andhra Pradesh from the 1950s. In 1960, Andhra Prabha's circulation was 53,000 for its two editions from Vijayawada and Chittoor. Andhra Patrika's sole edition from Madras sold 48,000 copies. Ten years later, Andhra Prabha, then publishing from Vijayawada and Bengaluru, reached 1,16,000; Andhra Patrika remained at 48,000.

After Nageswara Rao's death in 1938, his son-in-law, Sivalenka Sambhu Prasad took over the operations. After Sambhu Prasad' s death, his successors closed the Madras edition and began publishing from Vijayawada and later Hyderabad, the capital of Undivided Andhra Pradesh. Circulation declined, and when the new Telugu daily Eenadu made its first appearance in the Audit Bureau lists in 1976, Andhra Patrika was down to 41,000. Eenadu was audited at 60,000. Ten years later, Andhra Patrika had fallen to 24,000; Eenadu had risen to 2,82,000 and was publishing from four centres. Subsequently, Andhra Patrika closed in April 1991. With circulation at less than 20,000, the descendants of Nageswara Rao and Sambhu Prasad stopped paying their dues to the ABC in 1988 and sold the indebted newspaper in 1989. A dispute then arose over whether the purchaser had acquired full legal control of the company. Lawsuits and questions in the legislature followed, and employees were no longer paid. Towards the end of its life, the newspaper could not be brought out on certain days for "want of money to buy newsprint."

== Contributors ==
Some of the noted people who worked for the daily include Krishnam Raju, Maa Telugu Talli poet, Sankarambadi Sundaraachari, Puripanda Appala Swamy, Veturi, Chirala Rama Rao, Goparaju Venkatanandam etc.

The editors include:

1. Kasinadhuni Nageswara Rao (1909–1938)
2. Penumudi Raghava Rao
3. G. Harisarvottamarao
4. C. Seshagirirao
5. Sivalenka Sambhu Prasad
6. Polavarapu Sriramulu (1944–1969)

== Revival ==
In 1990s, liquor businessman and Telugu newspaper patron, Magunta Subbarama Reddy purchased the property and tried to revive the daily. But after he was killed by the Naxalites in 1995, the effort did not succeed.

All the journals and newspaper were digitized and stored at Gowthami Grandhalayam, Rajamahendravaram.

== Book ==
- Andhra Patrika Charitra by C.V. Rajagopalarao (2004)
