= Amrita Schools of Business =

Private Business schools in India

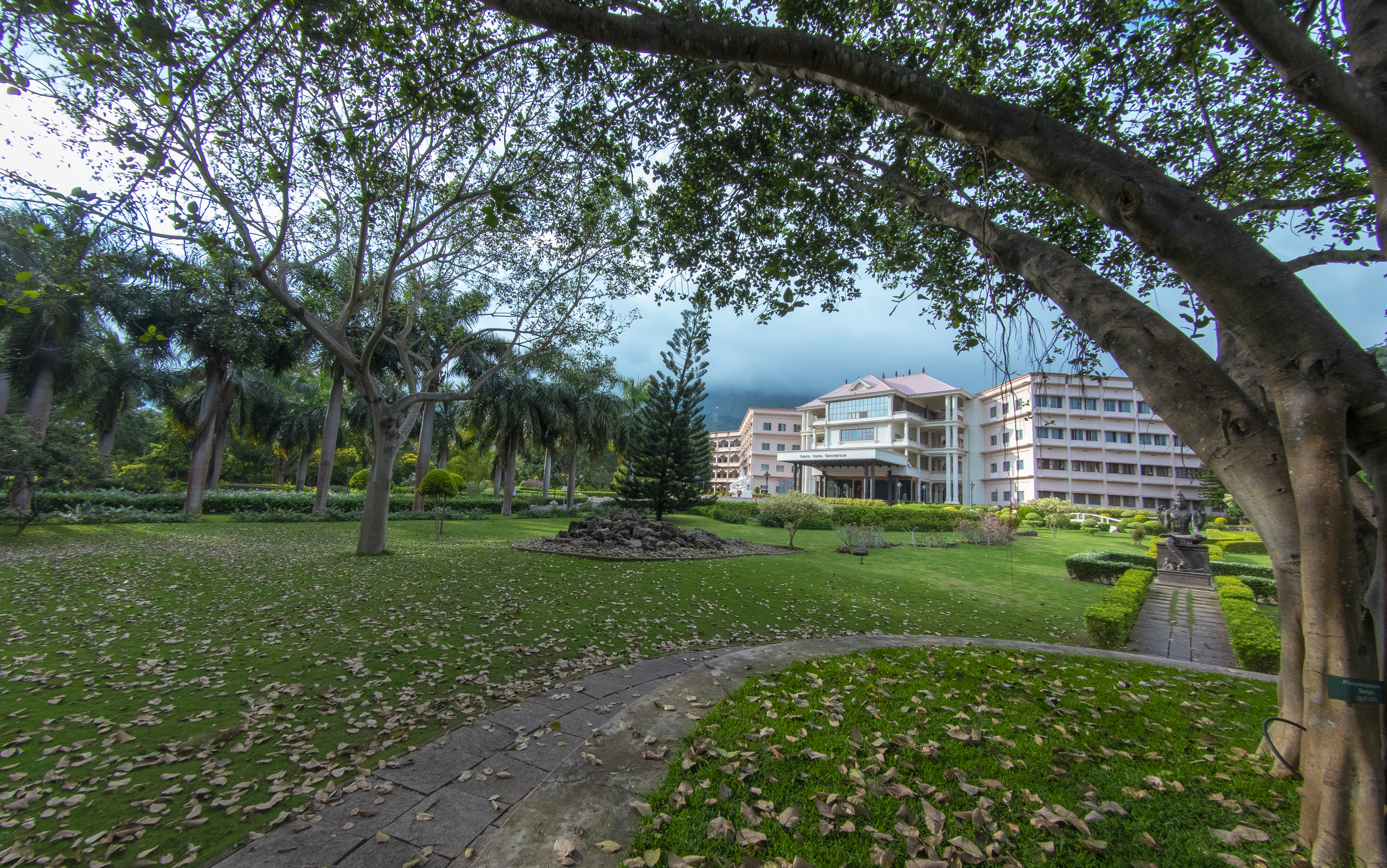
- Type: Private Business Schools
- Established: 1996
- Founder: Mata Amritanandamayi Devi
- Parent institution: Amrita Vishwa Vidyapeetham
- Accreditation: Association to Advance Collegiate Schools of Business
- Affiliations: National Assessment and Accreditation Council, National Board of Accreditation
- Chancellor: Mata Amritanandamayi
- Dean: Dr. Nava Subramaniam
- Location: Coimbatore, India
- Campus: multiple sites, 1,300 acres (530 ha)
- Language: English
- Website: www.amrita.edu/school/business

Amrita Schools of Business are the business schools of Amrita University in India. The schools are spread across the university's five campuses in Amritapuri (Kollam), Bengaluru, Kochi, Coimbatore, and Amaravati. They offer a full-time MBA program, an MBA-MS program, management-related doctoral programs, and many executive and online education programs.

Amrita was the 11th school in India to be accredited by the Association to Advance Collegiate Schools of Business (AACSB), which accredits only a small percentage of business schools worldwide.

The schools were founded by Mata Amritanandamayi Devi in 1996 and are managed by her international humanitarian organization, the Mata Amritanandamayi Math.

== History ==
The Amrita School of Business, Coimbatore, was established in 1996 in the village of Ettimadai, in the foothills of the Bouluvanpatty ranges, about 20 km from Coimbatore city. As Amrita's first campus, it is still home to the administrative headquarters of Amrita University.

Currently, the university has schools of business at five of its seven campuses.

In 2022, a business school began operating at its new campus at Amaravati, the capital city of Andhra Pradesh.

== Campuses ==
=== Amrita School of Business, Coimbatore ===
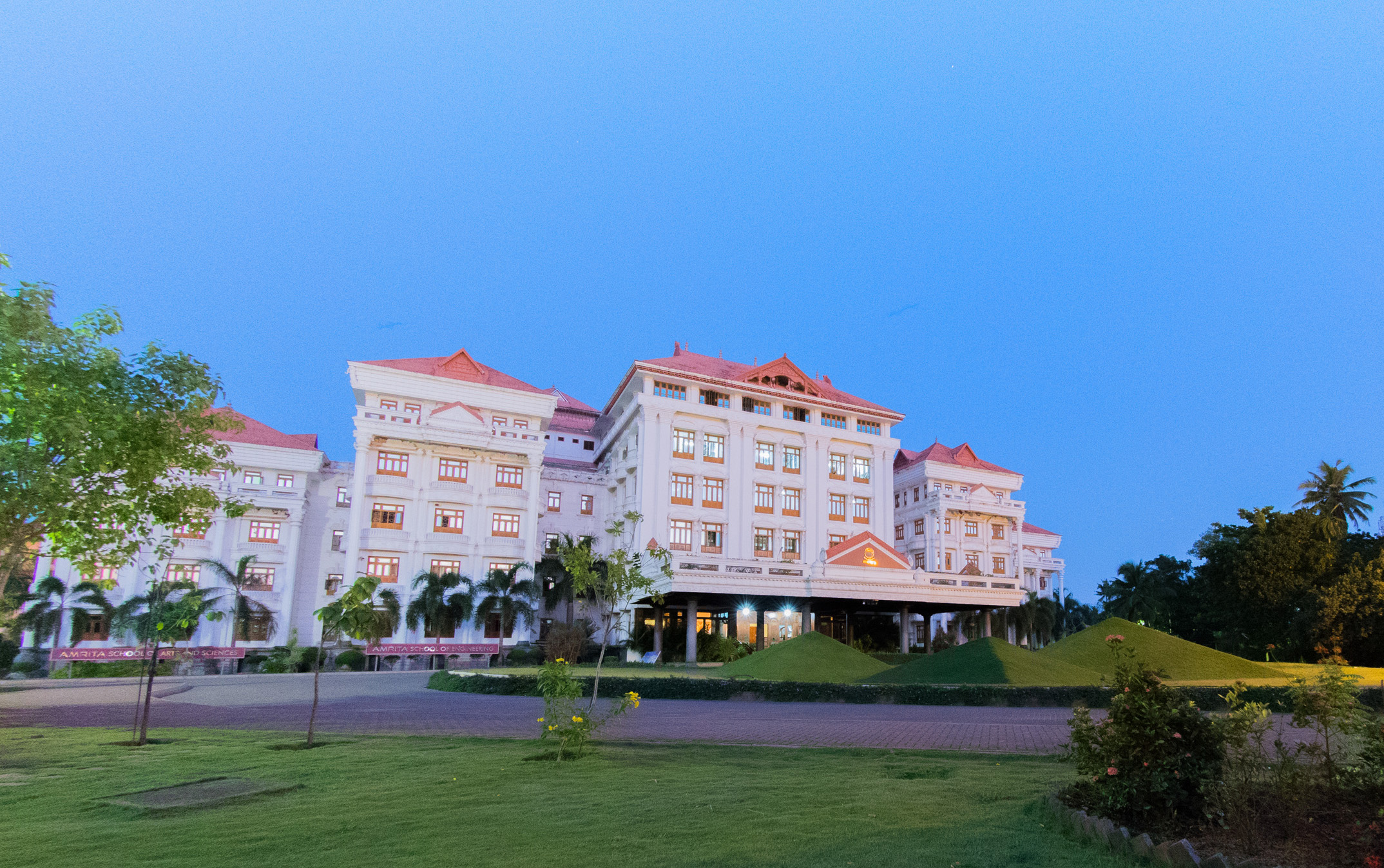
Amritapuri campus

The School of Business at the Coimbatore campus started in 1996. As the headquarters of the university, it has the largest intake of students annually and offers full-time MBA and doctoral courses. This campus also houses the IBM Business Analytics Lab.

=== Amrita School of Business, Bengaluru ===
The School of Business in the Bengaluru campus offers two management programs, a full-time MBA-MS. and a part-time Executive MBA-MS in Business Analytics with University at Buffalo. It also offers doctoral programs.

=== Amrita School of Business, Kochi ===
The School of Business on the Kochi campus started functioning in 1998. It offers full-time MBA and doctoral programs.

=== Amrita School of Business, Amritapuri Kollam ===
The School of Business in the Amritapuri campus started in 2002. It offers full-time MBA and doctoral courses.

The schools also offers UGC approved online BBA, MBA, MA and other management courses.

=== Amrita School of Business, Amaravati ===
The School of Business at the Amaravati campus started in 2022. It offers full-time BBA, MBA and doctoral courses.

== Rankings ==
University rankings

Business/Management – India
- NIRF (2024): 28

Amrita Vishwa Vidyapeetham was ranked 801–1000 in the world by the Times Higher Education World University Rankings of 2021 The QS World University Rankings of 2020 ranked it in 261–270 band in Asia. Amrita Vishwa Vidyapeetham of which Amrita Schools of Business is a constituent part, has been ranked 151-200 according to QS ranking of BRICS universities. It was ranked 5th best in India among universities by the National Institutional Ranking Framework in 2021. The Government of India awarded Institute of Eminence status to the university. The university is also accredited with A++ by NAAC.

Amrita School of Business, Coimbatore was ranked 19th among the Top private B-schools in India by careers360 magazine for the year 2014.

== Academics ==
=== Academic programmes ===
The school offers BBA, MBA, PhD and online management courses. The schools offer MBA specializations in Finance, Marketing, Human Resources (HR), Operations Management, Entrepreneurship and Business Analytics. In addition, it offers a dual degree program leading to an MS in information technology and MBA in collaboration with State University of New York at Buffalo, for working professionals at the Bangalore campus.

The school also emphasizes on Sustainable Development, Business Ethics and Social Responsibility. The university has collaborations with many foreign universities including the University of California.

=== Curriculum ===
Curriculum at Amrita Schools of Business is created by its Academic Council based on the intellectual contributions of Industry experts, Academic researches, Faculty, Alumnus and industry expectations.

The school in Coimbatore houses the IBM Business Analytics Lab, which was inaugurated by Kaushik Bhaskar, Vice President of Information Integration & Governance Software and India Software Labs, IBM India.

== Admissions and Aid ==
=== Admission ===
Admission to Master of Business Administration degree programs is through scores in Common Admission Test, Management Aptitude Test, Common Management Admission Test or Graduate Management Admission Test and an interview. Admission for online courses is based on score in qualifying examination.

=== Scholarships ===
The schools also offer scholarship based on Common Admission Test, Graduate Management Admission Test scores and Cumulative grade point average.
