= Vegayammapeta Estate =

Indian administrative division

Vegayammapeta
- Zamindari Estate
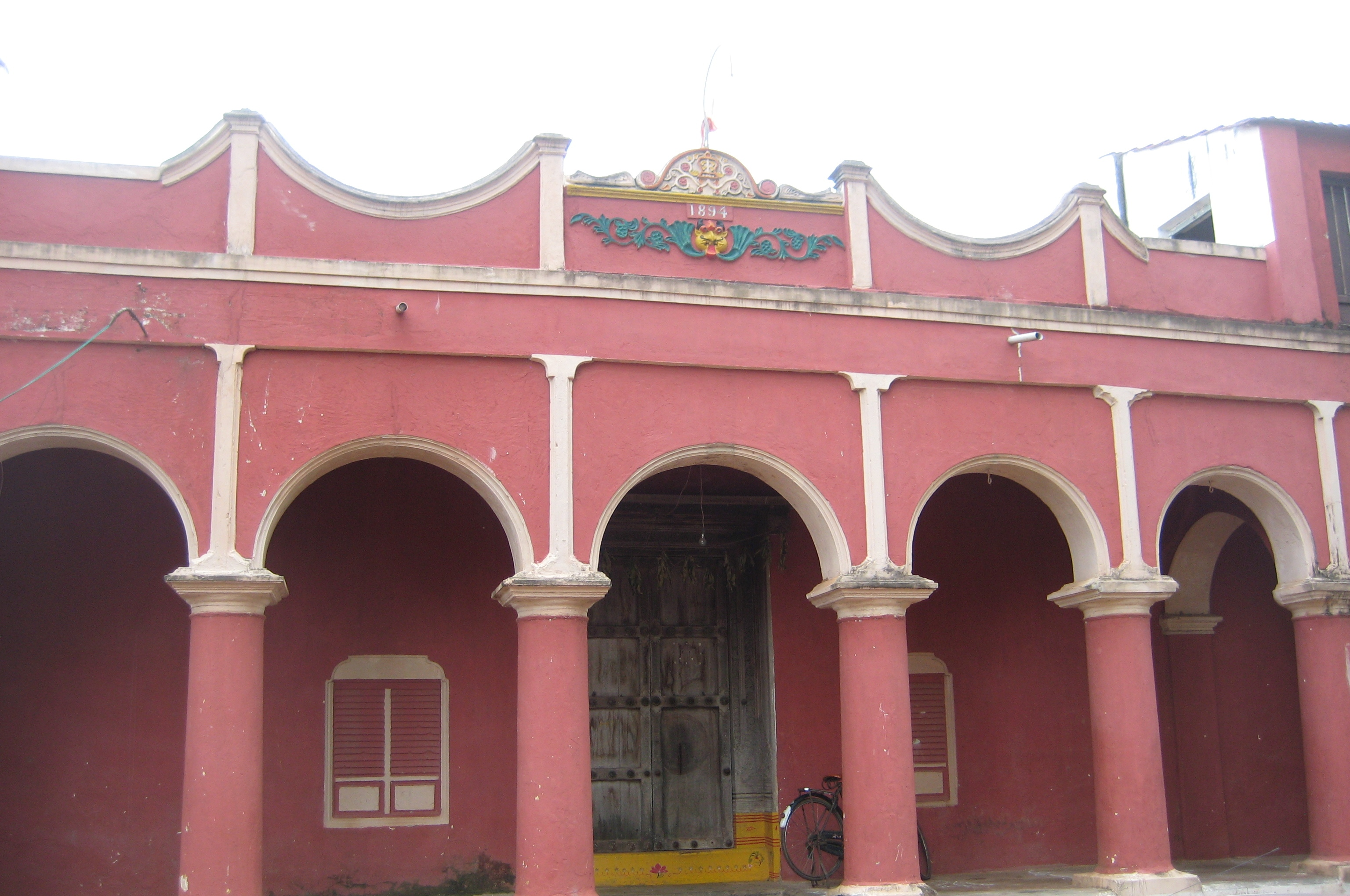
- Diwanam at Vegayammapeta
- Number of Villages: 10 Villages
- Possession: 16th Century
- Accession: 1949

Vegayammapeta Estate is an ancient zamindari estate which is permanently settled by the British Government in 1802–03 with a revenue of 17,196 and a peskash 8,464. It comprises 10 villages.

== History ==
Vegayammapeta is the zamindari of the same name. The estate was originally granted to Vadrevu family by Hyder Badshah for his literary ability. It was permanently settled in 1802–03. It was divided into further estates in 1809 and this share had 10 villages. The villages of Vegayammapeta Zamindari are:

- Vegayammapeta
- Kuduvuru
- Gudigalla
- Mathukumilli
- Kurakallapalli
- Utrumilli
- Nelaturu
- Nidsanametta
- Gummileru
- Mirthipadu

The suit related to this Zamindari went up to privy council for judgement in 1879.
