= Amrutham =

Amrutham may refer to:

- Amrita, an elixir of life in Indian mythology
- Amrutham (film), 2004 Indian Malayalam-language film
- Amrutham (TV series), Indian Telugu-language television series
- Amrutham Chandamamalo, 2014 Indian Telugu-language space film
- Amrutham Dhvitheeyam, Indian Telugu-language series and a sequel to Amrutham (TV series)
- Amrutham Gamaya, a 1987 Indian Malayalam-language film

== See also ==
- Amrita (disambiguation)
- Amrut (disambiguation)
