= Amrita Virk =

Amrita Virk ਅੰਮ੍ਰਿਤਾ ਵਿਰਕ
- Born: 11 June 1975 (age 51)
- Occupation: Singing
- Years active: 1998–present
- Website: Amrita Virk on Instagram

Amrita Virk (Punjabi: ਅੰਮ੍ਰਿਤਾ ਵਿਰਕ) is a Punjabi singer from Indian Punjab. She entered the world of Punjabi music in 1998, releasing her first album, Kalli Beh Ke Ro Laini Aan.

== Life and career ==
Virk was born on 11 June 1975. She started singing at very early age like in school functions. She started professional singing in 1997 when the industry was dominated by male singers. In July 1998, she released her first album, Kalli Beh Ke Ro Laini Aan, which made her a recognised singer in the music industry.

== Discography ==
She released 56 albums till now. Some of her albums are:

- Kalli Beh Ke Ro Laini Aan (July 1998)
- Saada Pai Gia Vichhora (Jan. 1999)
- Masti Bharia Akhara (Mar. 1999)
- Yaari Tutti Ton (May 1999)
- Dil Tuttya Laggda (May 1999)
- Masti Bharia Duja Akhara (June 1999)
- Doli Hune Hi Turi Aa (Aug. 1999)
- Tainu Pyar Ni Kardi Main (Oct. 1999)
- Hae Tauba (Feb. 2000)
- Pyar Ho Gia (April 2000)
- Tutt Ke Sharik Ban Gia (Nov. 2000)
- Tu Mainu Bhull Javenga (Feb. 2001)
- Stagi Dhamaka (June 2001)
- Teri Yaad Sataaundi Ai (Sept. 2001)
- Pai Na Jaan Puaare (Nov. 2002)
- Paani Dian Chhallan (Feb. 2004)
- Timtimaunde Taare (Mar. 2004)
- Dil Di Wahi (Dec. 2004)
- Tauhr Amrita Di (Dec. 2007)
- Terian Nishania (Feb. 2009)

== See also ==
- Jaswinder Brar
- Dharampreet
