= Amrita Shinde =

Indian cricketer (born 1975)

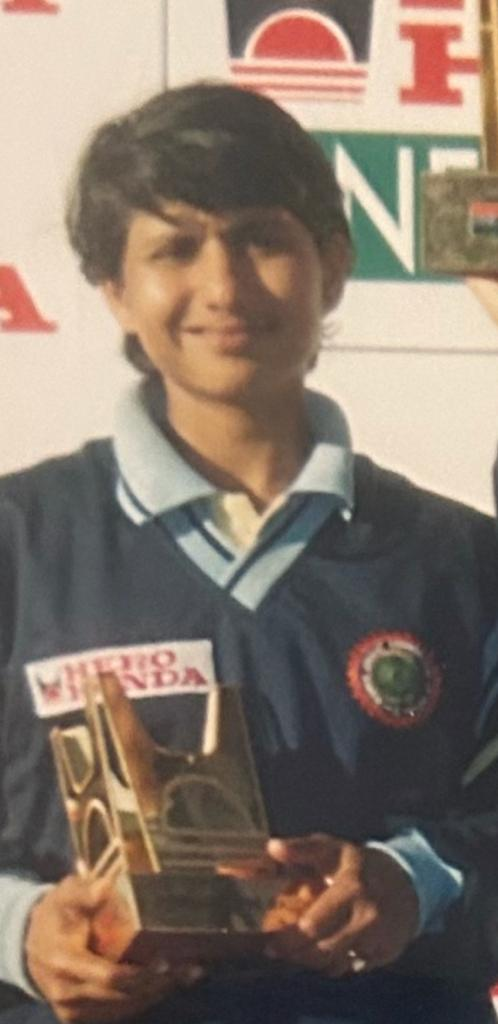

Personal information
- Full name: Amrita Shinde
- Born: 9 July 1975 (age 51); Kolhapur, Maharashtra, India
- Nickname: Aru
- Batting: Right-handed
- Bowling: Right-arm leg break
- Role: All-rounder

International information
- National side: India (2002)
- Only Test (cap 57): 14 January 2002 v England
- ODI debut (cap 64): 21 January 2002 v England
- Last ODI: 13 March 2002 v South Africa

Domestic team information
- Years: Team
- 1993/94–1998/99: Maharashtra
- 2002/03–2004/05: Air India
- 2006/07–2008/09: Maharashtra

Career statistics
| Competition | WTest | WODI | WFC | WLA |
|---|---|---|---|---|
| Matches | 1 | 5 | 12 | 65 |
| Runs scored | 29 | 93 | 166 | 1,687 |
| Batting average | 29.00 | 23.25 | 16.60 | 33.74 |
| 100s/50s | 0/0 | 0/1 | 0/0 | 1/11 |
| Top score | 29 | 78 | 41 | 102 |
| Balls bowled | 48 | 96 | 270 | 998 |
| Wickets | 1 | 0 | 12 | 34 |
| Bowling average | 17.00 | – | 13.50 | 18.02 |
| 5 wickets in innings | 0 | 0 | 1 | 0 |
| 10 wickets in match | 0 | 0 | 0 | 0 |
| Best bowling | 1/17 | – | 5/47 | 4/8 |
| Catches/stumpings | 1/– | 2/– | 4/– | 15/– |
- Source: CricketArchive, 24 June 2022

Amrita Shinde (born 9 July 1975) is an Indian former cricketer who played as an all-rounder, batting right-handed and bowling right-arm leg break. She appeared in one Test match and five One Day Internationals for India, all in early 2002. She played domestic cricket for Maharashtra and Air India.
