= Rekapalle Estate =

Indian administrative division

Rekapalle Estate is a taluk of Bhadrachalam, India. Rekapalle Estate is around 200 square miles (520 km^{2}).

== History ==
Palvancha Estate was originally obtained in 1324. Originally, Bhadrachalam Zamindar possessed half of the proprietary rights on the estate. Rekapalle taluk was one of them and was first leased out in 1574 to a family in Korukonda and was termed as Taluqdar of Rekapalle. He was murdered by his Diwans in 1814 when Sri Rajah Sureddy Venkayya was divided from the main estate. This was transferred to Central Provinces in 1860, which was included to Godavery district in 1860, formerly in the Nizam Dominions. Rekapalle Estate included Rekapalle Taluk, Marrigudem and Nandigama, of which Nandigama is a considerable estate.

Rekapalle Estate was part of Palvancha estate of Aswa Raos, after Bhadrachalam and Rekapalle were transferred from Nizam dominions to Central Provinces. Bharachalam Zamindars were called superior proprietors, while Rekapalle Zamindars were called Inferior Proprietors.

== Rebellion ==
Few rebellions took place there and the Rekapalle Zamindar donated ₹800 to Sri Ramagiri Devasthanam.

== Relations ==
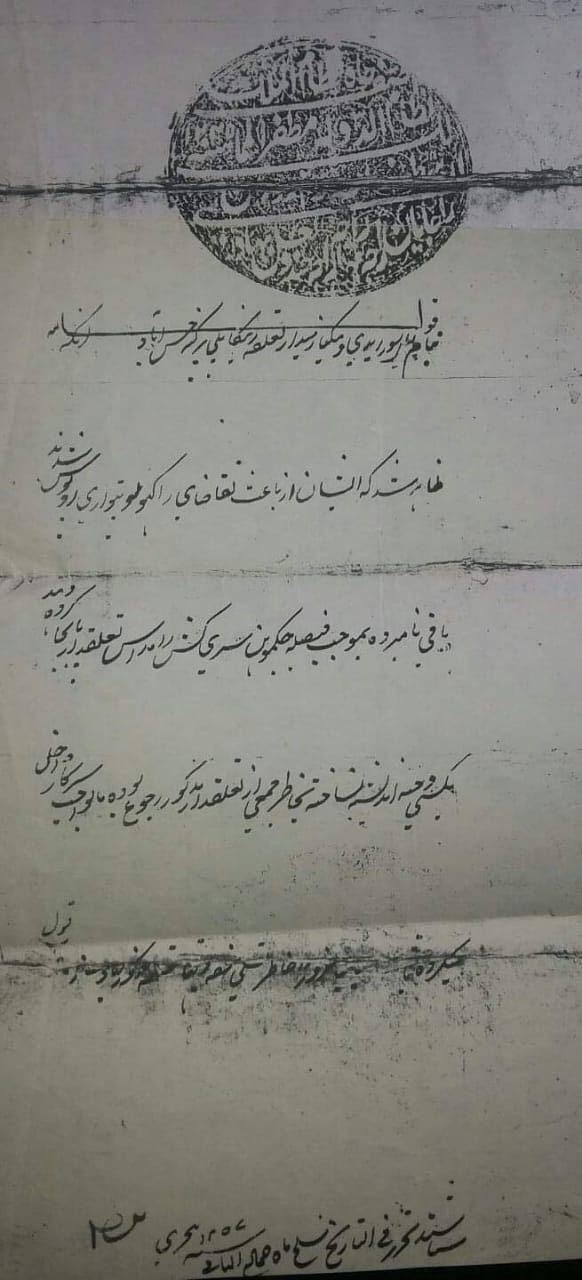
Farmana resented by Nizam Nawab to Rajah Surreddy family

Sri Rajah Surireddy Venkata Ramachandrayya garu, gave his daughter in marriage to Sri Rajah Yenumula Ramanna Dora Garu. Sri Rajah Sureddy Varaha Lakshmi Narasimha Murthy Dora married the daughter of Sri Rajah Bommadevara Basyakarulu, Raja of Pangidigudem. Sri Rajah Sureddy Basyakarulu married the daughter of Mansabdar, Sri Rajah Yenumula Dora, These Yenumula families have relations with Allam Mokhasadars family and Vogeti Family. Rekapalle Zamindar sold a part of their Zamindari in which Nandigama Zamindari was bought by Muttangi Buchiramayya, who gave part of it to Zamindar Vogeti Seshagiri Rao (Gannavaram Estate), the son of Raja Vogeti Ramakrishnayya and had good relations with them. They belong to Ontari caste. The clan has four

heirs: Sri Rajah Sureddy Bhaskar, Sri Rajah Sureddy Jagapathi and Sri Rajah Sureddy Sai Sri raja Sureddy pavan Bhashyakarlu .[7]

== Rajas of Rekapalle ==
- Sri Rajah Surireddi Venkayya Dora
- Sri Rajah Surireddi Venkata Ramachandrayya Dora
- Sri Rajah Surireddi Varaha Lakshmi Narasimha Murthy Dora
- Sri Rajah Surireddi Basyakarlu Dora
- Sri Rajah Surireddi Tirumala rayalu
- Sri Rajah Surireddi Venkata Ramachandrayya Dora
