= Amrita Island =

Island in Massachusetts, United States

Coordinates: 41°39′35″N 70°37′08″W

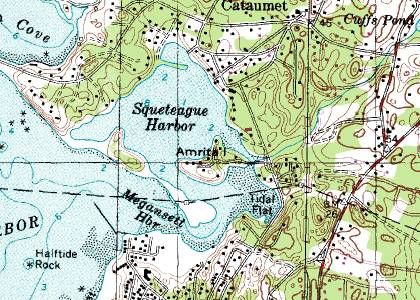
USGS Map showing Amrita Island

Amrita Island is a small inhabited island in Squeteague Harbor in the village of Cataumet in the town of Bourne, in Barnstable County, Massachusetts. Several residential homes are located on the island. Baxendale Road is the only road and it connects the island to the mainland from Megansett Road.

== History ==
Thomas Baxendale, of Brockton, Massachusetts, and his wife Esther Minerva purchased Amrita Island in 1893. The couple then began to build a residence on the island, including a mansion named "Island Haven," along with a stone bridge; four other homes named Stonehenge, Sorrento, Castle le Mere, and Guardian; three bathing pavilions; a gazebo; a cottage; and a mausoleum that would eventually house the Baxendales and several of their beloved animals.

View of the mansion and mausoleum built by Thomas Baxendale

The island is well known for its ties to animal welfare advocacy. Baxendale was an advocate for animal welfare, and during his time on Amrita Island, he hosted lectures on animal advocacy and donated funds to the local Animal Rescue League. Upon Esther Baxendale's death in 1927, Harvard University was given Amrita Island in the Baxendales' will. In turn, Harvard University donated the island's 21 acres (8.5 ha) to the Animal Rescue League of Boston. On a mainland parcel of land adjacent to the Island, until 2007, the Animal Rescue League operated "a summer camp for inner city children between the ages of seven and fourteen...where they learned animal care, dog obedience, pet shows, nature study, and woodworking."
