= Amrut, Afghanistan =

Amrut
- Location in Afghanistan
- Coordinates: 36°59′N 68°34′E
- Country: Afghanistan
- Province: Kunduz Province

Amrut is the name of a village in Kunduz Province in the Khinjan valley near the mouth of the Bajgah glen, about six miles east of Khinjan. It has earlier been inhabited by Koh-i-Gadi Hazaras.

== See also ==
- Kunduz Province
