= List of Southern Punjab cricketers =

This is a list of cricketers who have played first-class, List A or Twenty20 cricket for Southern Punjab cricket team. Seasons given are first and last seasons; the player did not necessarily play in all the intervening seasons. Players in bold have played international cricket.

== A ==
- M. Asthana, 1964/65

== L ==
- Amrit Lal, one appearance in 1967–68 season, against Northern Punjab

== S ==
- Balindu Shah, 1941/42
