= Amrit Abhijat =

Indian Administrative Service officer

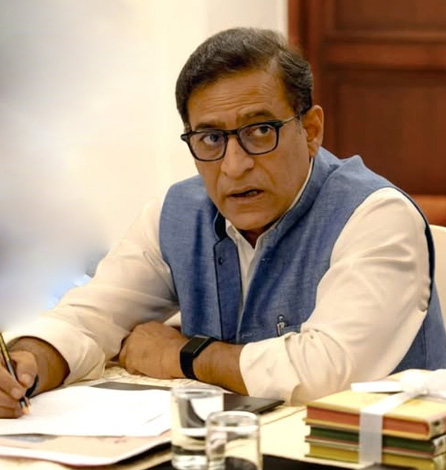
- Born: 21 June 1968 (age 58); Munger, Bihar, India
- Citizenship: Indian
- Education: Kirori Mal College; University of Delhi; University of Sussex
- Occupation: IAS officer
- Years active: 1995–present
- Employer(s): Government of Uttar Pradesh; Government of India
- Organization: Indian Administrative Service
- Known for: Housing for All (Pradhan Mantri Awas Yojana)

Amrit Abhijat (born 21 June 1968) is a 1995 batch IAS officer from the Uttar Pradesh cadre. Since September 2025, he has been serving as the Additional chief secretary of Tourism and Culture department of the Government of Uttar Pradesh. Before that he served as the Joint Secretary and Mission Director in the Ministry of Housing and Urban Affairs in the Government of India.

== Early life and education ==
Amrit Abhijat was born on 21 June 1968 in Munger, Bihar India. He completed his undergraduation from Kirori Mal College of Delhi University and his post graduation from University of Sussex in UK.
