= Amrita Lal Basu =

Indian playwright (1853–1929)

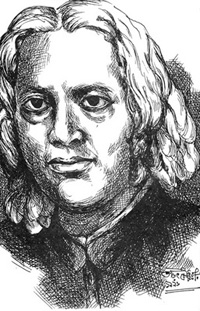
- Born: 1853; Calcutta, British India
- Died: 1929 (aged 75–76)
- Other name: Rasraj / রসরাজ (King of Humor)
- Occupation: Playwright

Amrita Lal Basu (1853–1929) was a playwright and stage actor of Calcutta. He was one of the pioneers of the public theatre in Bengal in British era. He is well known for his farces and satirical plays.

== Works ==
- Byapika Biday (1926)
- Dvande Matanam (1926). d. Anantatanay (Dattatray Anant Apte) (b. 1879)
- Tiltarpan (1881)
- Bibaha Bibhrat (1884)
- Taru-Bala (1891)
- Kalapani (1892)
- Bimata (1893)
- Adarsha Bandhu (1900)
- Avatar (1902)
- Babu (1893)
- Chorer Upar Batpari

== Education ==
He graduated from the General Assembly's Institution (now the Scottish Church College), before proceeding to the Calcutta Medical College, from where he dropped out after two years of study.
