= Amrutanjan (balm) =

Pain-relieving balm

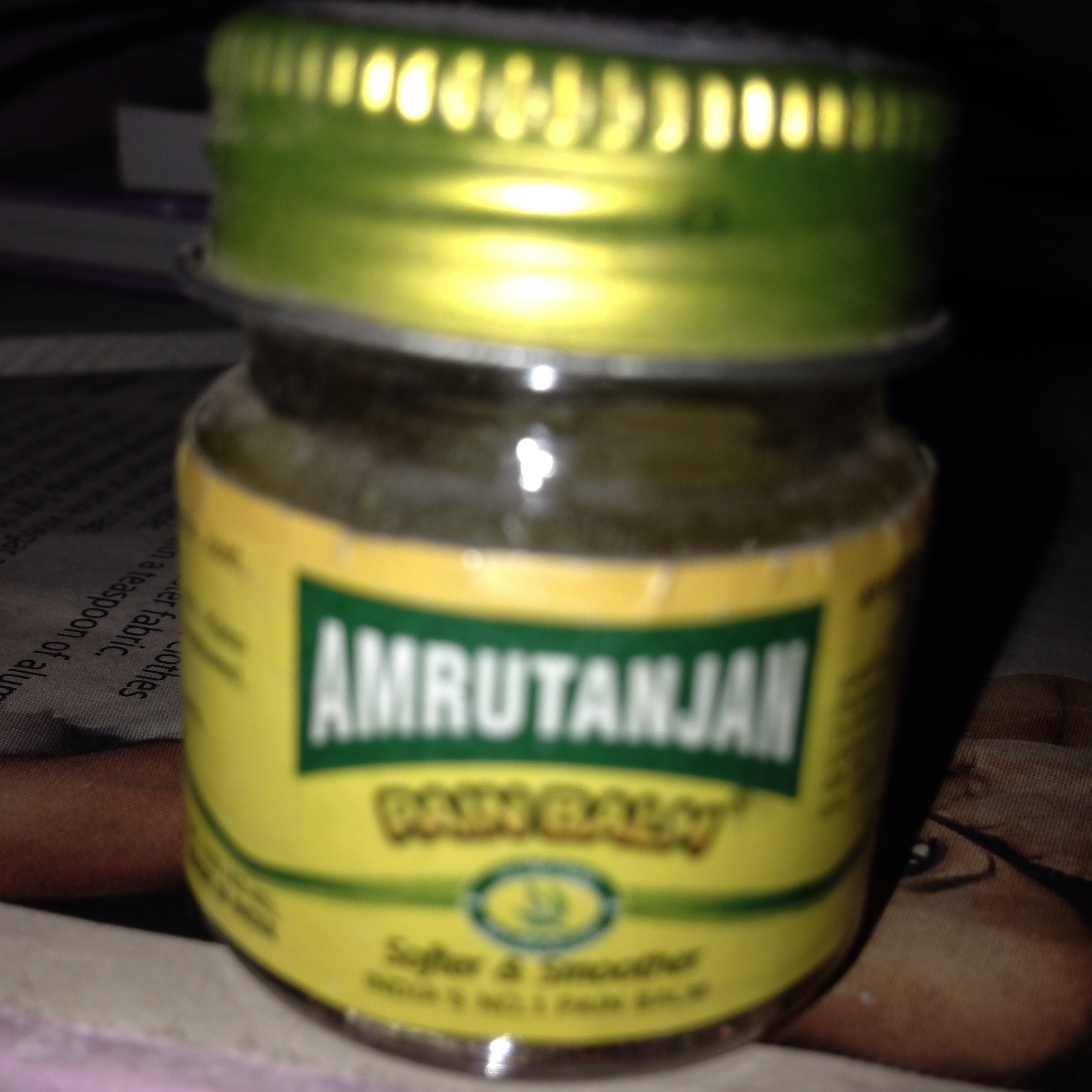
- Amrutanjan Pain Balm
- Type: Liniment
- Inventor: Kasinathuni Nageswara Rao
- Inception: 1893; 133 years ago
- Manufacturer: Amrutanjan Healthcare
- Available: Available
- Current supplier: Amrutanjan Healthcare
- Website: www.amrutanjan.com

Amrutanjan is an analgesic balm manufactured and distributed by Amrutanjan Healthcare.

== History ==
Amrutanjan was founded in 1893 by journalist, Kasinathuni Nageswara Rao. He popularized the balm by distributing it free-of-cost at music concerts. Even today, the words "Bombay" are inscribed along with Amrutanjan on the lid of its most well-known product, the pain balm. In 1936, Amrutanjan became a public limited company with the name Amrutanjan Limited.

== Medical uses ==
It is used as a balm for:

- Headache
- Muscular ache
- Muscular strain
- Arthritis

== Holding company ==
The brand is owned by the parent Amrutanjan Healthcare. It is now headed by Sambhu Prasad, the grandson of Nageshwara Rao.
