= Thotapalle Estate =

Indian administrative division

Thotapalle
- Mansabdari Estate
- Number of Villages: 103 Villages
- Possession: 1683
- Resumed: 1881
- Accession: 1953

Thotapalle is a village in the erstwhile East Godavari district of Andhra Pradesh. It was also a mansabdari estate with the same name. It had a revenue of ₹46,462 by 1874–75 and peskash of ₹6,310. It was an impartible estate which was resumed by the government in the year 1881 and they were granted with a Privy Purse of ₹19,500 which continued till the abolition. After its resumption in 1881, the estate is further divided into unenfranchised inams of Inferior mokhasas to their sub branches of the original holders. 27 villages were further bought by the Maharajah of Pithapuram. They were annexed to the government in 1953.

== History ==
Originally the ancestors of these Mansabdars of Thotapalle were Poligars in the Vijayanagara Empire. They later came to present East Godavari and entered to serve the Peddapuram Zamindari and later rose to the position of Diwan. Later Raghavaraju of Raghavapatnam estate somehow mismanaged the estate and gave Thotapalle estate to Yenumula Bapam Dora and Jaddangi Estate to Boggula Gunnam Reddi Dora in 1693. From then Yenumula family held this estate as a jagir to provide the Zamindar with army when needed. They maintained 700 poens under them and the estate became an impartible estate. Later the fight for hierarchy rose in the estate during 1859 and it continued and the estate finally went into the hands of Sri Rajah Yenumula Ramanna Dora in 1872, descendant of Bapam Dora by his eldest son. Later during 1877 the estate due to ill management sold 27 villages to the Maharaja of Pithapuram. Thus it being an impartible estate, government resumed the estate and granted 27 villages to Pithapuram Maharaja and made other 37 villages as unenfranchised inams to pay Quit-rent directly to the government. They were given to the descendants of Yenumula Chengu Dora, Brother of Bapam Dora in 1881.

== Fort ==
They built a fort in totapalli which extends 200 acres in oval shape.

== Sub Branch ==
The descendants of Yenumula Chengu Dora held nearly 23 villages and a family held General power of attorney on A.Mallavaram estate 7 villages hereditarily. These were abolished and annexed to the government of India in 1953.
