= Vogeti Ramakrishnayya =

Indian politician (1830–1900)

Raja Vogeti Ramakrishnayya
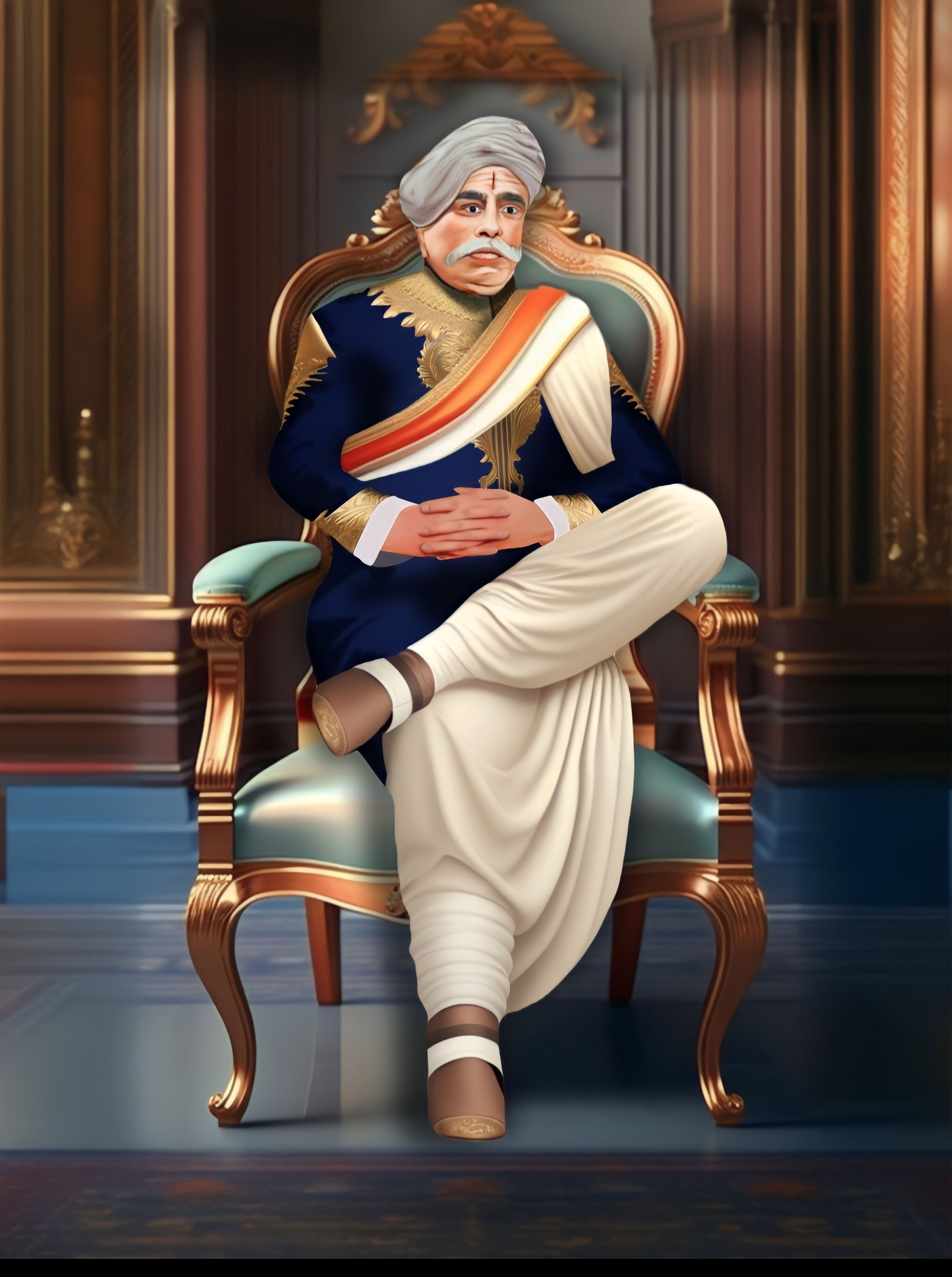
- Born: 10 October 1830; Rajahmundry, Madras
- Died: 20 June 1900 (aged 69); Rajahmundry, Andhra Pradesh, India
- Occupations: Justice of the peace, Zamindar, Municipal Councillor
- Spouse: Subbayamma
- Children: 1
- Parent(s): Vogeti Jaggarao Naidu, father
- Relatives: Vogeti Apparao Naidu, grandfather

Raja Vogeti Ramakrishnayya (10 October 1830 – 20 June 1900) was born to a zamindari family of Rajahmundry, India, where he was for a long time an honorary magistrate and municipal councillor, as well as a wealthy landlord who owned more than 16 businesses.

== Ancestry ==
The Meraka Veedhi Telagas had a prominent role in the city, as they had been senathipathis (commanders) and samantharajus (governors) of the Vijayanagara Empire, who came to Rajahmundry in the year 1754, after occupying the nawab fort of Rajahmundry and serving for a century in Maratha armies. Their family deity is Sri Venugopala Swamy. The Vogeti family had already donated heavily to this deity's temple These Meraka Veedhi Telagas have had a prominent role in history and politics. and were the trustees of the temple for many generations. They are Vaishnavas.

Ramakrishnayya's grandfather was offered vast tracts of land and to hold rights to the land attached to it. This would allow him to collect taxes as a zamindar. He rejected that role, and held the land as his own. He was still given the title of zamindar. From that time on, the family held the estates of Korukonda, Jambupatnam, Gummaldoddi, Kapavaram, Punyakshetram, Hukumpeta, and Morampudi, as well as extensive landholdings in Rajahmundry.

== Personal life ==
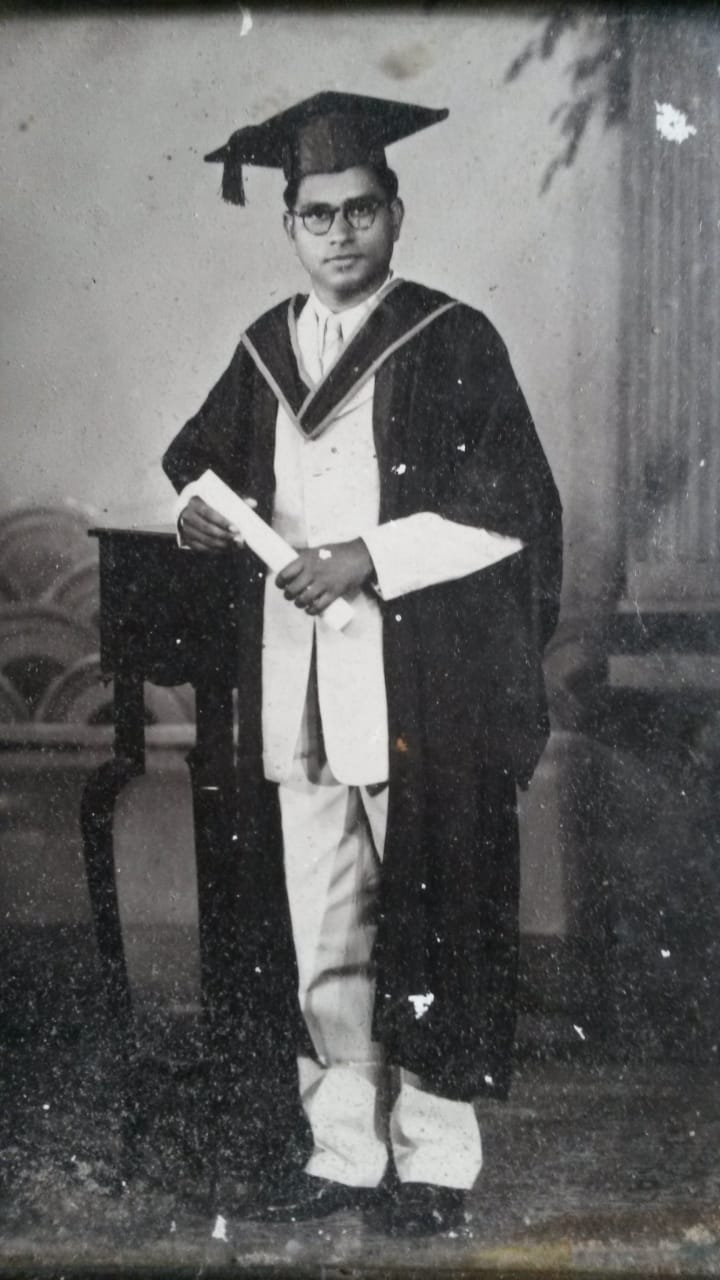
Vogeti Venkata Gopala Rama Krishnam Raju of Rajahmundry

Born into the rich Vogeti family of the Meraka Veedhi Telaga clan, Ramakrishnayya was the son of Vogeti Jaggarao Naidu and the grandson of Vogeti Apparao Naidu. From childhood, Ramakrishnayya was raised as a zamindari, with the respect that entailed. His childhood friends included Kanchumarthi Narasayya Naidu and Bayapuneedi Venkanna. Ramakrishnayya studied law in Madras.

Ramakrishnayya married Subbayamma, who was the mother-in-law of Yerra Narasimha Rao, the sister of Yerra Subbarayudu—the munsif of the district—the daughter of Subedar Yerra Venkata Swamy, and the granddaughter of Subedar Major Sardar Bahadur Yerra Ayyanna.

== Political life ==
Ramakrishnayya was a longtime councillor on the Rajahmundry municipal council. He also acted as the justice of the peace, where he had judiciary power under the government to make decisions and enact laws, in lieu of the government, as was possible under the Zamindari system.

Ramakrishnayya worked for the development of the city. He strove to rescue people from being victims of fraudulent practices.

He took Zamindar Kanchumarthi Ramachandra Rao under his care, after the latter lost his adoptive father at a very young age. Tanguturi Prakasam Panthulu, former chief minister of Andhra Pradesh, studied with the help of Kanchumarthi Ramachandra Rao at the same time when the latter was under the guidance of Ramakrishnayya. Rao acknowledged the political preeminence of Ramakrishnayya, and together they started many non-profit rice mills for the benefit of the people.

== Death ==
Ramakrishnayya died in 1900, at which time the retail shop owners closed their shops and offered condolences to the great soul.

== Descendants ==
His son is Vogeti Seshagiri Rao, zamindari—part landholder of the Nandigama Estate—whom he adopted from his daughter. The son married the daughter of Muttangi Buchiramayya, zamindar of Nandigama, Prakkilnka, Annadevarapeta, Jaggampeta, and the sister of Muttangi Jaggarao, the president of the madras landholders association.

His grandson is Raja Vogeti Venkata Gopala Rama Krishnam Raju, who married the granddaughter of Sri Rajah Yenumula Ramanna Dora, zamindari part landholder of Thotapalle Estate, who are also relatives of the Sri Rajah Surreddi family—zamindars of Rekapalle, Vogeti Lakshmana Raju.Raj Ramakrishnam Raju's grandson , Raja Vogeti Venkata Rama Rushi is an Author, Animator, Research Analyst.

His three granddaughters are Andalamma, Mangatayaramma, and Subbayamma.

== See also ==
- Tanguturi Prakasam
