= Amrutanjan Healthcare =

Indian pharmaceutical company private limited

Amrutanjan Healthcare Limited
- Type: Public
- Traded as: NSE: AMRUTANJAN; BSE: 590006
- Industry: Ayurvedic health-care products, beauty products, Informational Technology, Business process outsourcing
- Founded: 1893; 133 years ago
- Founder: Kasinathuni Nageswara Rao
- Headquarters: 42–45 Luz Church Road, Mylapore, Chennai – 600004, India
- Key people: S Sambhu Prasad (Chairman)
- Revenue: ▲₹421 crore (US$45 million) (FY22)
- Net income: ▲₹67 crore (US$7.2 million) (FY22)
- Website: amrutanjan.com

Amrutanjan Healthcare Limited is an Indian pharmaceutical company headquartered in Chennai, Tamil Nadu, India. It was founded by Kasinadhuni Nageswara Rao in Bombay (now Mumbai) in 1893.

== History ==
Amrutanjan was established as a patent medicine business in Bombay (now Mumbai) in 1893 by K. Nageswara Rao Pantulu who was a journalist, social reformer and freedom fighter. The headquarters were shifted to Madras (now Chennai) in 1914.

As of 2014, it is headed by Sambhu Prasad, the grandson of Nageshwara Rao.

== Products ==
Amrutanjan Healthcare's main product is its pain balm. In 2002, Amrutanjan Healthcare launched a series of anti-diabetic medicines called Diakyur. In 2004, the company launched herbal mouth-fresheners under the brand name "Affair".

The Amrutanjan group also includes a software company called Amrutanjan Infotech. In July 2001, Amrutanjan Infotech's call-centre began its operations.

In May 2011 Amrutanjan diversified into foods, buying out Siva's Soft Drink Pvt Ltd, a Chennai-based company which sells fruit juices under the Fruitnik brand. It has relatively paid out ₹260 Million for the acquisition.

=== Amrutanjan balm ===
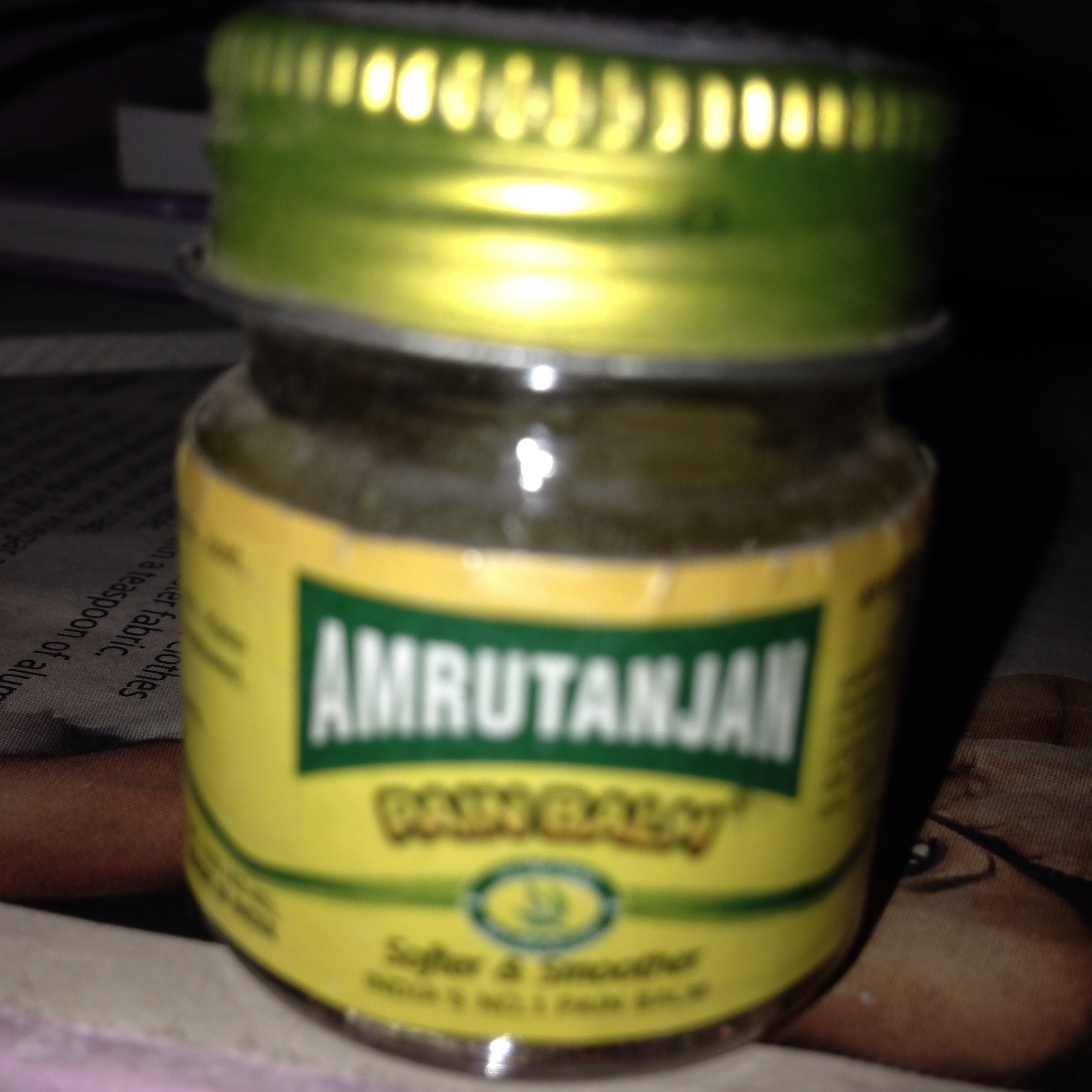
Amrutanjan pain balm.

In 1936, Amrutanjan became a public limited company with the name Amrutanjan Limited. Kasinathuni Nageswara Rao popularised the balm by distributing it free-of-cost at music concerts.

On 13 November 2007, the company changed its name from Amrutanjan Limited to Amrutanjan Healthcare Limited and has ever since been known by that name.

On 4 July 2002, Amrutanjan Healthcare entered the U.S. market.

In 2022, the company launched a period pain roll-on under Comfy brand.

== Bibliography ==
- Muthiah, S. (2004). Madras Rediscovered. East West Books (Madras) Pvt Ltd. ISBN 81-88661-24-4.
