= Vegayammapeta =

- Village
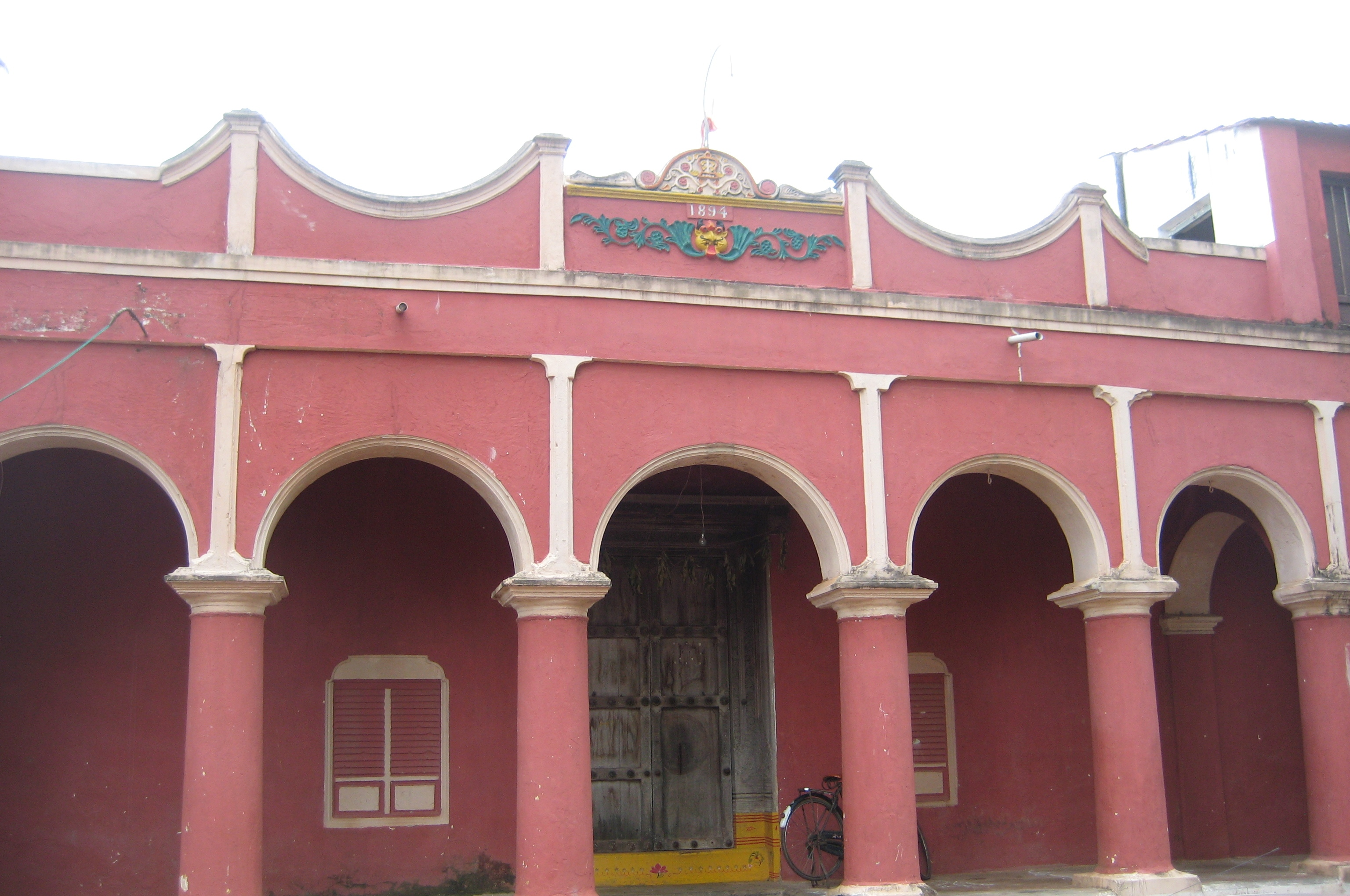
- Diwanam at Vegayammapeta
- Interactive map of Vegayammapeta
- Coordinates: 16.7806°N 82.0814°E
- Country: India
- State: Andhra Pradesh
- District: Konaseema

Population (2011)
  - Total: 6,776

Languages
  - Official: Telugu
- Time zone: UTC+5:30 (IST)
- PIN: 533262
- Nearest city: Kakinada
- Lok Sabha constituency: Amalapuram
- Vidhan Sabha constituency: Ramachandrapuram

Vegayammapeta is a village in the municipality of Ramachandrapuram, East Godavari, in the Indian state of Andhra Pradesh. As of 2011, it has a population of 6,776.
