= 62nd National Film Awards =

2015 Indian film award

- Awarded for: Best of Indian cinema in 2014
- Awarded by: Directorate of Film Festivals
- Presented by: Pranab Mukherjee; (President of India)
- Announced on: 24 March 2015
- Presented on: 3 May 2015
- Official website: dff.nic.in

Highlights
- Best Feature Film: Court
- Best Non-Feature Film: Tender is the Sight
- Best Book: Silent Cinema (1895–1930)
- Best Film Critic: Tanul Thakur
- Dadasaheb Phalke Award: Shashi Kapoor
- Most awards: Haider (5)

The 62nd National Film Awards ceremony was an event during which the Directorate of Film Festivals presented its annual National Film Awards to honour the best films of 2014 in Indian cinema. The awards were announced on 24 March 2015 and the ceremony was held on 3 May 2015.

== Selection process ==
The Directorate of Film Festivals invited nominations for the awards by late December 2014 and the acceptable last date for entries was until 20 January 2015. Feature and Non-Feature Films certified by the Central Board of Film Certification between 1 January 2014 and 31 December 2014 were eligible for the film award categories. Books, critical studies, reviews or articles on cinema published in Indian newspapers, magazines, and journals between 1 January 2014 and 31 December 2014 were eligible for the best writing on cinema section. Entries of dubbed, revised or copied versions of a film or translation, abridgements, edited or annotated works and reprints were ineligible for the awards.

For the Feature and Non-Feature Films sections, films in any Indian language, shot on 16 mm, 35 mm, a wider film gauge or a digital format, and released in cinemas, on video or digital formats for home viewing were eligible. Films were required to be certified as a feature film, a featurette or a Documentary/Newsreel/Non-Fiction by the Central Board of Film Certification.

== Dadasaheb Phalke Award ==
Introduced in 1969, the Dadasaheb Phalke Award is the highest award given to recognise the contributions of film personalities towards the development of Indian cinema and for distinguished contributions to the medium, its growth and promotion. Following were the jury members:

- Jury Members

• Gulzar
• Asha Bhosle
• Jahnu Barua
• Prasoon Joshi
• Rakeysh Omprakash Mehra

For the year 2014, the award was announced on 23 March 2015 to be presented to actor, film-maker Shashi Kapoor. He has won two National Film Awards including Best Actor for New Delhi Times in 1985 and is also Padma Bhushan recipient of 2011.

Name of Award	Image	Awardee(s)	Awarded As	Awards
Dadasaheb Phalke Award		Shashi Kapoor	Actor, film-maker	Swarna Kamal, ₹10 lakh (US$10,000) and a Shawl

== Feature films ==
Hindi film Haider won the maximum number of awards (5).

=== Jury ===
For the Feature Film section, six committees were formed based on the different geographic regions in India. The two-tier evaluation process included a central committee and five regional committees. The central committee, headed by Bharathiraja, included the heads of each regional committee and five other jury members. At regional level, each committee consisted of one chief and four members. The chief and one non-chief member of each regional committee were selected from outside that geographic region.

Central Jury

• Bharathiraja (Chairperson)
• Lekh Tandon	• Joyoshree Arora
• K. Bhagyaraj	• Jayshree Kanal
• Keval Arora	• Kirti Jain
• Sanjoy Hazarika	• Bela Negi
• Manmohan Chadha	• Nanthyath Gopalakrishnan

Northern Region: (Bhojpuri, Dogri, English, Hindi, Punjabi, Rajasthani, Urdu)

• K. Bhagyaraj (Head)
• Ashok Mishra	• Batul Mukhtiar
• Nayan Prasad	• Parvin Dabas

Eastern Region: (Assamese, Bengali, Oriya and North-Eastern dialects)

• Thara Anooraadha (Head)
• Krishnendu Bose	• Manmohan Chadha
• Patricia Mukhim	• Prabin Hazarika

Western Region: (Gujarati, Konkani, Marathi)

• Lekh Tandon (Head)
• Amrik Gill	• Dnyanesh Moghe
• Mangesh Hadawale	• Rajiv Vijayankar

Southern Region I: (Malayalam, Tamil)

• Joyoshree Arora (Head)
• Kamal	• R. Selvaraj
• Sudesh Syal	• S. Muruganantham

Southern Region II: (Kannada, Telugu)

• Jayshree Kanal (Head)
• B. N. Subramanya	• Leslie Carvalho
• Pradip Kurbah	• Rajesh Touchriver

=== All India Award ===
Following will be the awards given:

==== Golden Lotus Award ====
Official Name: Swarna Kamal

All the awardees are awarded with 'Golden Lotus Award (Swarna Kamal)', a certificate and cash prize.

Name of Award	Name of Film(s)	Language	Awardee(s)	Cash prize
Best Feature Film	Court	Marathi	Producer: Vivek Gomber; Director: Chaitanya Tamhane	₹ 250,000/- Each
Best Debut Film of a Director	Asha Jaoar Majhe	Bengali	Producer: For Films; Director: Aditya Vikram Sengupta	₹ 1,25,000/- Each
Best Popular Film Providing Wholesome Entertainment	Mary Kom	Hindi	Producer: Viacom 18 Motion Pictures & Sanjay Leela Bhansali; Director: Omung Kumar	₹ 200,000/- Each
Best Children's Film	Kaaka Muttai	Tamil	Producer: Grass Root Film Company; Director: M. Manikandan	₹ 150,000/- Each
Best Children's Film	Elizabeth Ekadashi	Marathi	Producer: Essel Vision Productions; Director: Paresh Mokashi	₹ 150,000/- Each
Best Direction	Chotushkone	Bengali	Srijit Mukherji	₹ 250,000/-

==== Silver Lotus Award ====
Official Name: Rajat Kamal

All the awardees are awarded with the 'Silver Lotus Award (Rajat Kamal)', a certificate and cash prize.

Name of Award	Name of Film	Language	Awardee(s)	Cash prize
Best Film on Other Social Issues	Chotoder Chobi	Bengali	Producer: Shree Venkatesh Films; Director: Kaushik Ganguly	₹ 150,000/- Each
Best Film on Environment / Conservation / Preservation	Ottaal	Malayalam	Producer: Director Cutz Film Company Pvt Ltd (K Mohanan and Vinod Vijayan); Director: Jayaraj	₹ 150,000/- Each
Best Actor	Naanu Avanalla...Avalu	Kannada	Sanchari Vijay	₹ 50,000/-
Best Actress	Queen	Hindi	Kangana Ranaut	₹ 50,000/-
Best Supporting Actor	Jigarthanda	Tamil	Bobby Simha	₹ 50,000/-
Best Supporting Actress	Pagdi The Honour	Haryanvi	Baljinder Kaur	₹ 50,000/-
Best Child Artist	Kaaka Muttai	Tamil	• J. Vignesh • V. Ramesh	₹ 50,000/-
Best Male Playback Singer	Haider	Hindi	Sukhwinder Singh (for "Bismil")	₹ 50,000/-
Best Female Playback Singer	Saivam	Tamil	Uthara Unnikrishnan (for "Azhage")	₹ 50,000/-
Best Cinematography	Chotushkone	Bengali	Sudeep Chatterjee	₹ 50,000/-
Best Screenplay • Screenplay Writer (Original)	Chotushkone	Bengali	Srijit Mukherji	₹ 50,000/-
Best Screenplay • Screenplay Writer (Adapted)	Ottaal	Malayalam	Joshy Mangalath	₹ 50,000/-
Best Screenplay • Dialogues	Haider	Hindi	Vishal Bhardwaj	₹ 50,000/-
Best Audiography • Location Sound Recordist	Khwada	Marathi	Mahavir Sabannavar	₹ 50,000/-
Best Audiography • Sound designer	Asha Jaoar Majhe	Bengali	Anish John	₹ 50,000/-
Best Audiography • Re-recordist of the Final Mixed Track	Nirbashito	Bengali	• Anirban Sengupta • Dipankar Chaki	₹ 50,000/-
Best Editing	Jigarthanda	Tamil	Vivek Harshan	₹ 50,000/-
Best Production Design	Nachom-ia Kumpasar	Konkani	Aparna Raina	₹ 50,000/-
Best Costume Design	Haider	Hindi	Dolly Ahluwalia	₹ 50,000/-
Best Make-up Artist	Naanu Avanalla...Avalu	Kannada	• Nagaraju • Raju	₹ 50,000/-
Best Music Direction • Songs	Haider	Hindi	Vishal Bhardwaj	₹ 50,000/-
Best Music Direction • Background Score	1983	Malayalam	Gopi Sundar	₹ 50,000/-
Best Lyrics	Saivam	Tamil	Na. Muthukumar (for "Azhage")	₹ 50,000/-
Best Choreography	Haider	Hindi	Sudesh Adhana (for "Bismil")	₹ 50,000/-
Special Jury Award	Khwada	Marathi	Bhaurao Karhade (Director)	₹ 1,25,000/-
Special Mention	Ain	Malayalam	Musthafa (Actor)	Certificate only
Special Mention	Nachom-ia Kumpasar	Konkani	Palomi Ghosh (Actress)	Certificate only
Special Mention	• Killa • Bhoothnath Returns	Marathi; Hindi	Parth Bhalerao (Child Artist)	Certificate only

=== Regional Awards ===
The award is given to best film in the regional languages in India.

Name of Award	Name of Film	Awardee(s)		Cash prize
Name of Award	Name of Film	Producer(s)	Director	Cash prize
Best Feature Film in Assamese	Othello	Artha Films	Hemanta Kumar Das	₹100,000 (US$1,000) each
Best Feature Film in Bengali	Nirbashito	Kaushik Ganguly Productions	Churni Ganguly	₹ 100,000/- Each
Best Feature Film in Hindi	Queen	• Phantom Films Pvt. Ltd. • Viacom 18 Motion Pictures	Vikas Bahl	₹ 100,000/- Each
Best Feature Film in Kannada	Harivu	Avinash U. Shetty	Mansore (Manjunatha Somashekara Reddy)	₹ 100,000/- Each
Best Feature Film in Konkani	Nachom-ia Kumpasar	Goa Folklore Productions	Bardroy Barretto	₹ 100,000/- Each
Best Feature Film in Malayalam	Ain	1:1 Entertainments	Sidhartha Siva	₹ 100,000/- Each
Best Feature Film in Marathi	Killa	• JAR Pictures • M R Film Works	Avinash Arun	₹ 100,000/- Each
Best Feature Film in Odia	Aadim Vichar	Mohapatra Movie Magic Pvt. Ltd.	Sabyasachi Mohapatra	₹ 100,000/- Each
Best Feature Film in Punjabi	Punjab 1984	White Hill Production India Pvt. Ltd.	Anurag Singh	₹ 100,000/- Each
Best Feature Film in Tamil	Kuttram Kadithal	JSK Film Corporation	G. Bramma	₹ 100,000/- Each
Best Feature Film in Telugu	Chandamama Kathalu	Working Dream Production	Praveen Sattaru	₹ 100,000/- Each

Best Feature Film in Each of the Language Other Than Those Specified in the Schedule VIII of the Constitution

Name of Award	Name of Film	Awardee(s)		Cash prize
Name of Award	Name of Film	Producer(s)	Director	Cash prize
Best Feature Film in Haryanvi	Pagdi The Honour	V R Entertainers	Rajeev Bhatia	₹ 100,000/- Each
Best Feature Film in Rabha	Orong	• Suraj Kr. Duwarah • Aucto Creation	Suraj Kr. Duwarah	₹ 100,000/- Each

== Non-Feature Films ==
Short Films made in any Indian language and certified by the Central Board of Film Certification as a documentary/newsreel/fiction are eligible for non-feature film section.

=== Jury ===
A committee of seven, headed by Kamal Swaroop, was appointed to evaluate the Non-Feature Films entries. The jury members were:

• Kamal Swaroop (Chairperson)
• Ahsan Muzid	• Harikumar Madhavan Nair
• Joy Bimal Roy	• Mir Mushtaq Ahmad
• Sanjiv Rattan	• Vandana Kohli

=== Golden Lotus Award ===
Official Name: Swarna Kamal

All the awardees are awarded with the 'Golden Lotus Award (Swarna Kamal)', a certificate and cash prize.

Name of Award	Name of Film	Language	Awardee(s)	Cash prize
Best Non-Feature Film	Tender is the Sight	English	Producer: Films Division; Director: Torsha Banerjee	₹ 100,000/- Each
Best Non-Feature Film Direction	Aaranyak	• Marathi • English	Renu Savant	₹ 150,000/-

=== Silver Lotus Award ===
Official Name: Rajat Kamal

All the awardees are awarded with 'Silver Lotus Award (Rajat Kamal)' and cash prize.

Name of Award	Name of Film	Language	Awardee(s)	Cash prize
Best First Non-Feature Film	Goonga Pehelwan	Hindi	Producer: Drishti Media; Director: Mit Jani, Prateek Gupta and Vivek Chaudhary	₹ 75,000/- Each
Best Anthropological / Ethnographic Film	Qissa–e–Parsi: The Parsi Story	English	Producer: Public Service Broadcasting Trust; Director: Divya Cowasji & Shilpi Gulati	₹ 50,000/- Each
Best Biographical Film / Best Historical Reconstruction Film	Aamaar Katha: Story of Binodini	Bengali	Producer: Films Division; Director: Tuhinabha Majumdar	₹ 50,000/- Each
Best Arts / Cultural Film	Kapila	Malayalam	Producer: Films Division; Director: Sanju Surendran	₹ 50,000/- Each
Best Promotional Film	Documentation of Clay Image Makers of Kumartuli	Bengali	Producer: Indira Gandhi National Centre for the Arts; Director: Ranajit Ray Assistant Director: Goutam Sharma	₹ 50,000/- Each
Best Environment Film Including Agriculture	I Cannot Give You My Forest		Producer: Top Quark Films Pvt. Ltd. Director: Nandan Saxena & Kavita Bahl	₹ 50,000/- Each
Best Film on Social Issues	Can't Take This Shit Anymore	Hindi	Producer: Bhagirathi Films; Director: Vinod Kapri	₹ 50,000/- Each
Best Film on Social Issues	Daughters of Mother India	Hindi English	Producer: Vibha Bakshi; Director: Vibha Bakshi	₹ 50,000/- Each
Best Educational / Motivational / Instructional Film	Komal	English Hindi	Producer: Climb Media India Pvt. Ltd. Director: Prashant Shikare	₹ 50,000/- Each
Best Educational / Motivational / Instructional Film	Behind the Glass Wall	Marathi	Producer: Gaahimedia; Director: Aruna Raje Patil	₹ 50,000/- Each
Best Exploration / Adventure Film	Life Force – India's Western Ghats	English	Producer: Grey Films India Pvt. Ltd. Director: Nallamuthu Subbiah	₹ 50,000/- Each
Best Investigative Film	Phum Shang	Manipuri	Producer: Films Division; Director: Haobam Paban Kumar	₹ 50,000/- Each
Best Animation Film	Sound of Joy	English	Producer: Aura Cinematics; Director: Sukankan Roy; Animator: Rishi Sahany	₹ 50,000/- Each
Best Short Fiction Film	Mitraa	Marathi	Producer: Athaansh Communications; Director: Ravi Jadhav	₹ 50,000/- Each
Best Film on Family Welfare	Towards the Silver Lining	Hindi	Producer: Satyajit Ray Film and Television Institute; Director: Bhabani Tamuli	₹ 50,000/- Each
Best Cinematography	Aamaar Katha: Story of Binodini	Bengali	Indraneel Lahiri	₹ 50,000/-
Best Audiography	Tender is the Sight	Bengali	• Anindit Roy • Ateesh Chattopadhyay • Ayan Bhattacharya	₹ 50,000/-
Best Editing	Tigress Blood	English	Andi Campbell Waite	₹ 50,000/-
Best Narration / Voice Over	Nitya Kalyani – Oru Mohiniyattam Patham	Malayalam	Ambooty (Anil Kumar), Devi S.	₹50,000 (US$520)
Special Jury Award	A Poet, A City & A Footballer	Bengali	Producer: Films Division; Director: Joshy Joseph	₹100,000 (US$1,000)
Special Mention	Gunjaa	Bhojpuri	Mrinal Dev (Director)	Certificate only
Special Mention	Seek and Hide	English	Manoj Kumar Nitharwal (Director)	Certificate only
Special Mention	5 O'Clock Accident	English	Ruchir Arun (Director)	Certificate only

== Best Writing on Cinema ==
The awards aim at encouraging study and appreciation of cinema as an art form and dissemination of information and critical appreciation of this art-form through publication of books, articles, reviews etc.

=== Jury ===
A committee of three, headed by Madhan, was appointed to evaluate the nominations for the best writing on Indian cinema. The jury members were as follows:

• Madhan (Chairperson)
• Anirudha Bhattacharjee	• Ziya Us Salam

=== Golden Lotus Award ===
All the winners were awarded with Swarna Kamal (Golden Lotus Award), cash prize and a certificate.

Name of Award	Name of Book	Language	Awardee(s)	Cash prize
Best Book on Cinema	Silent Cinema (1895–1930)	English	Author: Pasupuleti Purnachandra Rao; Publisher :EMESCO BOOKS	₹75,000 (US$780)

Name of Award	Language(s)	Awardee	Cash prize
Best Film Critic		Tanul Thakur	₹75,000 (US$780)

=== Special Mention ===
All the award winners are awarded with Certificate of Merit.

Name of Award	Name of Book	Language	Awardee(s)	Cash prize
Best Book on Cinema	Pride of Tamil Cinema (1931–2013)	English	G. Dhananjayan	Certificate Only

== See also ==
- National Film Awards
