= Bhagirathi Films =

Indian film production company

- Company type: Private
- Industry: Entertainment & Media
- Founded: Jan 2015
- Founders: Vinod Kapri
- Headquarters: Mumbai, Maharashtra, India
- Products: Films & Documentaries
- Services: Film production
- Website: www.bhagirathifilms.com

Bhagirathi Films is an Indian film production company established by senior journalist and filmmaker Vinod Kapri. Founded in 2015, Bhagirathi Films won the National Film Award for Best Film on Social Issues at the 62nd National Film Awards.

== Awards ==
- 62nd National Film Awards: Best Non Feature Film on Social Issues: Can't Take This Shit Anymore

== Filmography ==
| Year | Film | Director | Type |
|---|---|---|---|
| 2014 | Can't Take This Shit Anymore | Vinod Kapri | Non-Feature |
| 2016 | India's Undesirable Daughters/Achhot Kanya | Vinod Kapri | Non-Feature |
| 2016 | Shaktiman | Vinod Kapri | Non-Feature |
| 2016 | Sorry Mamma | Vinod Kapri | Non-Feature |
| 2016 | 144 Hours | Vinod Kapri | Non-Feature |
| 2017 coming soon | Pihu | Vinod Kapri | Feature |
