= Joshy Mangalath =

Award-winning Indian film screenwriter

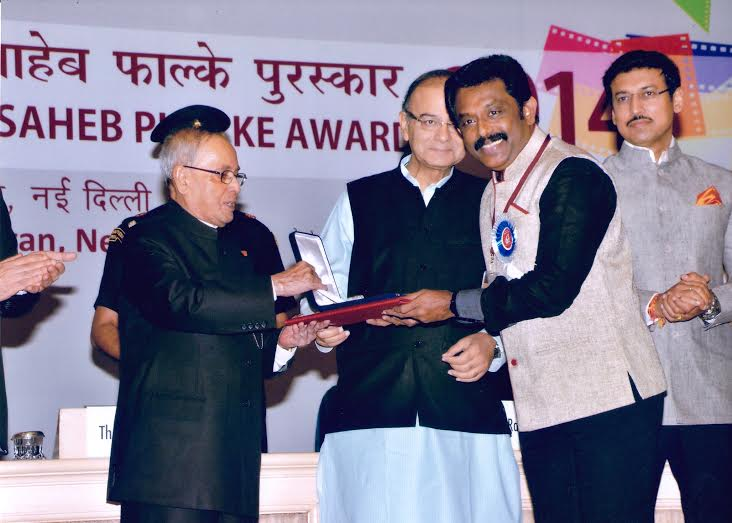
- Born: Attingal, Kerala, India
- Education: MBA Edexel University U.K
- Occupations: Screenwriter, Writer
- Spouse: Sandhya
- Children: 2

Joshy Mangalath is an Indian film screenwriter who made his debut with the feature film Ottaal for which he got the National award for the Best Screenplay (adapted). In 2015, he received the National Film Award for Best Screenplay (adapted) for the 2014 Malayalam film Ottaal, at the 62nd National Film Awards.

== Early life ==
He was born in Attingal, Kerala.

== Career ==
Joshy started his job as H.R. & Admin Manager in a US-based company Dubai. Currently settled at Kerela. Ottaal is his first screenplay realized as film, which won him a National Award. Ottaal (A wicker basket for catching fish) story is based on Anton Chekhov's short story 'Vanka'. 'Vanka' is a tale of an orphan boy who works under a cobbler and the hardships he endures. It was film Director Jayaraj who has asked Joshy to do a Screenplay based on Vanka. Ottaal – which bagged the National award for the best film on environment protection and wins Crystal Bear award at the Berlin film festival. The film made history, becoming the first-ever Malayalam movie to have swept all the top awards in the 20-years history of the International Film Festival of Kerala including the Suvarna Chakoram( Golden Crow Pheasant).

== Awards ==
National Film Award

- 2014 - 62nd National Film Awards - Ottaal BEST SCREENPLAY (Adapted)

== Filmography ==
=== Screenwriter ===
Year	Title	Cast	Director	Script writer	Awards and Honours
2014	Ottaal	Vasudevan	Jayaraj	Joshy Mangalath	1. National award JOSHY MANGALATH- Best Script writer (adapted); 2. National award for Best Film on Environment conservation/Preservation; 3. Best Film Kerala State government award; 4. Suvarna Chakoram - IFFK award; 5. Best Film of the international Federation of film critics (FIPRESCI); 6. Best Malayalam film of the network for the promotion of Asian Cinema (NETPAC); 7. Audience Poll award; 8. Mumbai Film Festival - Film Social Impact Award; 9. Children Feature -Golden Gate Way award; 10. Won Crystal Bear at Berlin Film Festival; 11. Nominated to 'Asia Pacific Screen Award (APSA)Brisbane, Australia.; 12. 8th Namaste India Festival, Romania - Official Selection.; 13. 14th Indian Film Festival of Los Angeles 2016 – Official Selection.; 14. 7th London Indian Film Festival 2016, England – Official Selection.; 15. 8th Hidden Gems Film Festival 2016, Calgary, Canada –Official Selection.; 16. 15th Imagine India International Film Festival 2016, Madrid, Spain –Official selection.; 17. 22nd Kinder Film Fest Kyoto, Japan 2016 –official Selection.; 18. International Young Audience Film Festival Ale Kino 2016, Poland - Official Competition.
