= Tender Is the Sight =

2014 Bengali documentary

Tender is the Sight
- Directed by: Torsha Banerjee
- Written by: Torsha Banerjee
- Cinematography: Aazaad, Torsha Banerjee
- Edited by: Saptarsi Mondal
- Release date: 2014
- Running time: 51:55 min
- Country: India
- Language: Bengali

Tender is the Sight is a 2014 Bengali documentary directed by Torsha Bannerji and produced by Films Division of India. It received the National Film Award for Best Non-Feature Film at the 62nd National Film Awards. The film explores the perspective of a visually impaired boy, who perceives the world through sounds such as running trains, sewing machines, an ironsmith’s anvil, and a weaver's loom. It was selected for screening at the Indian Panorama 2015.

== Plot ==
The film revolves around Hassibullah, a young teenager who confronts the challenges of living without sight since childhood. It portrays his unique perception of the world through sound, depicting his interpretations of space, time, seasons, and the physical motions of everyday life in a touchable world.

The filmmaker, Torsha Banerjee, has showcased the blind school, its students, and their daily routines. The story mainly centered around Hassibullah, a blind boy whom Torsha decided to accompany home. This journey allowed viewers to glimpse into Hassibullah's world and his distinct way of perceiving things.

== Awards ==
- Best Non-Feature Film
- Best Audiography: Ateesh Chattopadhyay, Anindit Roy, Ayan Bhattacharya
