= Can't Take This Shit Anymore =

- Directed by: Vinod Kapri
- Written by: Vinod Kapri
- Screenplay by: Vinod Kapri
- Story by: Vinod Kapri
- Produced by: Bhagirathi Films Pvt Ltd; Banyan Infomedia Pvt Ltd
- Cinematography: Indish Batra
- Edited by: Vinay Kashyap
- Music by: Upmanyu Bhanot
- Release date: 2014
- Running time: 50 minutes
- Country: India
- Language: Hindi (English subtitles)

Can't Take This Shit Anymore is a 2014 Indian documentary film by Vinod Kapri. It received the National Film Award for Best Film on Social Issues at the 62nd National Film Awards. It tells the stark tale of the daily lives of women — the indignity and dangers they face while defecating in the open.

== Content ==
Can’t Take This Shit Anymore shows six married women who return to their parents’ homes for lack of toilets in their new homes. Faced with the indignity and discomfort of having to defecate in the open, these women chose to weather the social pressure and return to their parents’ homes, something unthinkable for a married woman in rural India.

Set in Uttar Pradesh's Kushinagar district, the documentary is a reminder of the desperate situation of women who are supposed to observe purdah on the one hand and on the other are forced to relieve themselves out in the open. Through interviews with the protagonists and a social activist, Asma, also the narrator, the film tells the tale of the indignity and dangers women face while defecating in the open.

The camera takes the viewer to the fields and roadsides where women converge in groups to relieve themselves under the cover of dark. A folk song highlighting this particular difficulty interlaces the film's narrative. Owing to Asma's campaign and the media coverage of the issue, government authorities build toilets in the six homes. Only then, the women returned to their marital homes.

While documenting the stories of these women, the film questions the priorities of the families who spend beyond their means on the wedding but do not have enough money to build a toilet in their backyard. It raises the question whether a toilet in the house serves the purposes of a woman only. Prime Minister Shri Narendra Modi's reference to the issue in his Independence Day speech is a reflection of how much still needs to be done in the area of sanitation.

== Awards and nominations ==
Award	Date of ceremony	Category	Recipients and nominees	Result
62nd National Film Awards	March 24, 2015	Best Film on Social Issues		Won
Indisches Filmfestival Stuttgart	15 July 2015	Official Selection		Won
Indian Film Festival of Australia	August 2015	Official Selection		Won
Kolkata International Film Festival	14 November 2015	Official Selection		Won
Haldwani Film Festival	October 2015	Official Selection		Won
