= Miss Tanakpur Haazir Ho =

- Theatrical release poster
- Directed by: Vinod Kapri
- Written by: Vinod Kapri
- Screenplay by: Vinod Kapri; Varun Gautam
- Story by: Vinod Kapri; Abhishek Sharma
- Produced by: Crossword Films; Vinay Tiwari
- Starring: Annu Kapoor; Om Puri; Ravi Kishan; Rahul Bagga; Hrishita Bhatt; Tarun Foujdar
- Edited by: Deven Murdeshwar
- Music by: Sushmit Sen; Palash Muchhal
- Production companies: Crossword Films; NG Film Crafts
- Distributed by: Fox Star Studios
- Release date: June 26, 2015
- Running time: 154 minutes
- Country: India
- Language: Hindi

Miss Tanakpur Haazir Ho (Note: Although the official translation is "Miss Tanakpur, be present", the actual connotations of this phrase are far more subtle. In the Indian system, when a witness is required in the court, the peon of the court, comes at the door of the court, and announces loudly, "Witness X Haazir Ho". This indeed translates literally as "Witness X, be present in the court". However, the call is more in the tone of a court order rather than a request. In this story, a buffalo called Miss Tanakpur is supposed to be a survivor of rape. It is rare for a survivor of rape [formerly called "victim of rape" in India], to be called like this for several reasons. One, a rape survivor is never called by her name or even by an allusion to her. Furthermore, there is no such clarion call for the victim in any case - let alone a rape survivor; the call is only for witnesses. The name is actually a very powerful satire on the Indian Judicial system, where such kinds of absurd cases are entertained. The absurdity of the entire case is reflected very powerfully in the absurd name of the movie.) is a 2015 Indian Hindi political satire film directed by Vinod Kapri. Inspired by true events, the film centers on a man accused of sexually molesting a buffalo. The film stars Rahul Bagga and Annu Kapoor, with Om Puri, Ravi Kishan, Sanjay Mishra, and Hrishita Bhatt in supporting roles. It was produced by Vinay Tiwari. It was released on 26 June 2015.

== Synopsis ==
Sualaal is the head of the village Tanakpur and a wealthy but impotent chauvinist. He married the much younger Maya. They tend to ignore each other. Arjun, however, a village youth, meets Maya and wins her heart. Arjun's father gives up his life savings to secure a job in the Police force. Sualaal suspects Maya cannot prove it. He is anguished that his wife mocked him for impotence.

One day a crony catches Maya and Arjun together. Arjun receives severe punishment. On the day of his sister's wedding while everyone is at the wedding, Arjun sneaks into Sualaal's home to meet Maya. When Saulaal can't find Arjun at the wedding hall, he immediately returns home and severely inflict pain on him. He is, however, restrained by his servants. They tell him that if he creates a scene, people will learn about his wife's affair which would shame him. He decides to frame Arjun in a rape case of his buffalo "Miss Tanakpur". The evidence is forged. Initially, everyone dismisses this as a shame, but then Sualaal pays bribes and gets the case registered by the police. Arjun is taken into custody, bringing shame and grief to his family. His sister's wedding is cancelled. His father goes on a hunger strike and dies. The police severely beat him and when he is brought in front of a court, the judges order prosecution to present the victim, Miss Tanakpur.

On their way to the next court hearing, Miss Tanakapur has an accident and she is injured. At this moment everyone is apathetic towards her, and only Arjun is sympathetic. On the third court hearing, Miss Tanakpur is brought to the court. The judge asks the police to do verification based on identification marks mentioned in the FIR and it is found that she is not Miss Tanakpur. The judge is annoyed and chides the prosecutor. Saulaal had sold the buffalo before filing a case. With great difficulty, they locate her and bring her to the police station. Meanwhile, Sualaal is unhappy with the court developments and decides to inflict further pain on Arjun's family. He announces that as a form of penance, Arjun must marry Miss Tanakpur. Maya is unable to bear this and offers to expose her husband. Arjun refuses her, and want her to avoid his fate. Throughout the ordeal, Arjun is sympathetic towards Miss Tanakpur. On the day of the wedding, Sualaal takes Miss Tanakpur from the police for the night. During the wedding she runs away and no one can trace her.

At subsequent court hearings, the police cannot produce her, leading the police officer investigating the case to be suspended. In order to exact his revenge, the police officer reveals the truth in the court and Sualaal along with his cronies are sent to jail. Arjun is acquitted.

== Cast ==
- Annu Kapoor as Sualaal Gandass
- Hrishita Bhatt as Maya
- Om Puri as Matang Singh
- Sanjay Mishra as Pandit
- Ravi Kishan as Bheema
- Rahul Bagga as Arjun Prasad
- Brijendra Kala
- Heena Panchal as item number

== Soundtrack ==
Palash Muchhal composed two songs and Susmit Sen composed one. The audio Was Released on T-Series.

Miss Tanakpur Haazir Ho

EP by Palash Muchhal Susmit Sen
- Released: Jun 26, 2015
- Recorded: 2015
- Genre: Soundtrack
- Length: 9:45
- Label: T-Series
- Producers: Palash Muchhal; Susmit Sen

Track list
No.	Title	Lyrics	Music	Singer(s)	Length
1.	"Naach Basanti"	Vinay Bihari, Shashi Joshi	Palash Muchhal	Anmol Malik, Anjan Guha	2:47
2.	"Andhera Andhera (Theme Song)"	Sanjeev Sharma	Susmit Sen	Sudheer Rikhari	4:15
3.	"Sasure Ke Kaudy Lag Gaye"	Vinod Kapri	Palash Muchhal	Sapna Awasthi, Shailesh Srivastav	2:45
Total length:					9:47

== Release ==
The film was released on 26 June 2015.

== Production ==
Director Vinod Kapri explained that the film is based on a real event in Rajasthan, in which the state high court sentenced a boy to jail for allegedly raping a buffalo. Kapri set the film in Haryana instead, because he liked the Haryanvi language. The film has a mix of Hindi and Haryanvi-language dialog.
