= Pihu =

- Official poster
- Directed by: Vinod Kapri
- Written by: Vinod Kapri
- Produced by: Ronnie Screwvala; Siddharth Roy Kapur; Shilpa Jindal
- Starring: Myra Vishwakarma; Prerna Sharma
- Cinematography: Yogesh Jaini
- Edited by: Irene Dhar Malik; Sheeba Sehgal; Archit D Rastogi
- Music by: Vishal Khurana
- Production companies: RSVP Movies; Roy Kapur Films
- Distributed by: RSVP Movies
- Release dates: November 2018 (IFFI); 16 November 2018 (India)
- Running time: 89 minutes
- Country: India
- Language: Hindi
- Budget: ₹50 lakhs
- Box office: ₹2.95 crore

Pihu is a 2018 Indian drama thriller film written and directed by Vinod Kapri and jointly produced by Ronnie Screwvala, Siddharth Roy Kapur and Shilpa Jindal. It stars Pihu (Myra Vishwakarma), a two-year-old girl, in the title role, who gets trapped inside her house with no escape. The film was shot in the Gandharav society of Greater Noida. The film was dedicated to Kirshan Kumar, who died from cardiac arrest. This film was inspired by an incident in 2014 in Delhi, in which a 4-year-old boy was locked in his home alone and found his mother dead.

== Plot ==
The movie starts on the day after Pihu's (Myra Vishwakarma) second birthday party. She wakes up and finds that her mother, Puja, (Prerna Sharma) is not waking up. Her father, Gaurav (Rahul Bagga, voice only) has left for Kolkata for a conference. She feels hungry and tries to wake her mother up, but she does not wake up causing Pihu to have a tantrum.

It is then revealed that Puja has taken her own life by an overdose of sleeping pills after a fight with Gaurav, and her face and hands are bruised indicating domestic violence, leaving a suicide note on the bedroom mirror, saying that she would've killed Pihu too, but couldn't bring herself to do it. Puja was upset because Gaurav had come late for Pihu's birthday party; Moreover, she suspected him of having an affair with her friend, Meera. Gaurav continuously attempts to call Puja, but to no response. Pihu manages to pick up the phone but her father is not able to understand her, asking to speak to Puja. Gaurav says that he has erroneously left the iron switched on and asks her to turn it off because Pihu might touch it. Shortly after, Pihu burns her fingers. She also almost electrocutes herself with exposed wires and burns two rotis in the microwave and on the stove, trying to make food for herself. She turns on the geyser (water heater), which after a few hours explodes, causing a large bang that concerns the other tenants of the apartment block and she hangs on the balcony railing trying to get her fallen doll. Luckily, a lady sees Pihu hanging dangerously and persuades her to get down and says she will bring Pihu's doll. The electricity also fluctuates multiple times. The tap water overflows and comes out of the main door. Neighbors see the water, but think the owners are on holiday.

Gaurav calls multiple times throughout the movie from Kolkata, even trying to apologise on phone to Puja for the fight, through Pihu. He realises that something is wrong when Pihu tells him that Puja has been sleeping all day, and leaves Kolkata immediately for home. Pihu eats the leftovers from the party, along with few of her mother's sleeping pills lying near her, causing her to fall asleep.

During the night, it is shown that the neighbors are trying to break in the house, seeing smoke emanating from within. Gaurav returns and finds the entire apartment messy and burned, with his wife dead and Pihu playing with her blocks, below the cot, being in an emotionless state. The movie ends with Gaurav mourning in agony and guilt.

== Cast ==
- Myra Vishwakarma as Pihu
- Prerna Vishwakarma as Puja, Pihu's mother
- Rahul Bagga as Gaurav, Pihu's father (voice only)
- Hrishita Bhatt as Meera (voice only)
- Anoop Trivedi as The Milkman
- Moon Moon Singh as Neighbour #1 (Punjabi Lady) (voice only)
- Sakshi Joshi as Neighbour #2 (Lady at Balcony) (voice only)
- Subhash Sahoo as Watchman (voice only)
- Ankur Dabas as Neighbour (Male) (voice only)
- Anup Das as Taxi driver (voice only)

== Production ==
Director Vinod Kapri said that the idea behind making the film was the question of "what does a toddler do when she is left alone at home?" He also based it on a real life incident that he read in 2014 in a national daily about a four-year-old boy in Delhi who was left alone at home with his dead mom. He decided to have minimal dialogues in the film, wanted the story to depend on "how the girl behaves", and felt that "every shooting schedule [was] unpredictable." According to him, the film explores issues faced by married couples, and compulsions about the concepts of family and children. Kapri spent four months with the child, getting to know her and familiarise her with the other crew members.

Though the girl had never acted before, Kapri is close friends with her parents, so they agreed for her to act on this project. The film was shot for two hours a day with three cameras placed on the set since Kapri felt "you can’t ask a two-year-old to give another take." Kapri made some changes in the script based on Myra's behavioral patterns. For two months, Myra moved to the flat that was rented for shoot. Kapri had to wait for six months after he had finalised Myra for the film due to production issues. Later, his friend Kishen Kumar came on board as a producer. With a budget of ₹45 lakh (US$47,000), they started shooting the film, but Kumar suffered a cardiac arrest and Kapri had to again seek help for the film's post-production budget.

== Release ==
Pihu was premiered at the 2018 International Film Festival of India in the Panorama section and was screened at the Fajr International Film Festival. The film was released theatrically on 16 November 2018. Thereafter, Netflix acquired the worldwide streaming rights and was released in June 2019.

== Reception ==
=== Critical response ===
On the review aggregator website Rotten Tomatoes, Pihu currently has a rating of 67%. The film was praised for Myra Vishwakarma's natural starring ability and Kapri's directorial style, but was criticized for having a manipulative direction.

=== Awards ===
Pihu won the Grand Prize for Best Feature Film in the International Competition category and the People's Choice award for Best Film at the 14th Trans-Saharan International Film Festival.
