= Baban (film) =

- Film poster
- Directed by: Bhaurao Nanasaheb Karhade
- Story by: Bhaurao Nanasaheb Karhade
- Produced by: Vitthal Nanasaheb Karhade; Pramod Bhaskar Chaudhary; Bhausaheb Shahaji Shinde; Monali Sandip Phand
- Starring: Bhausaheb Shinde; Gayatri Jadhav; Shital Chavan; Suhas Munde; Devendra Gaikwad; Yashu W Surekha; Abhay Chavan; Sima Samarth
- Cinematography: Ranjeet Mane
- Edited by: Pradeep Patole
- Music by: Harshit Abhiraj; Onkarswaroop.
- Production companies: The Folk Confluence Entertainment Group; Chitraksha Films
- Distributed by: Sunshine Studio
- Release date: 23 March 2018
- Country: India
- Language: Marathi
- Budget: ₹3.5 crore
- Box office: est. ₹15 crore

Baban is a 2018 Indian Marathi-language comedy-drama film directed by Bhaurao Karhade and produced by The Folk Confluence Entertainment Group and Chitraksha Films.

== Plot ==
In an endeavor to convert the traditional business into a big one, ambitious Baban strives hard to fulfill his dreams of prosperity. But the circumstances lead him elsewhere, which in-turn gives rise to a storm.

== Cast ==
- Bhausaheb Shinde
- Gayatri Jadhav
- Shital Chavan
- Devendra Gaikwad
- Murnal Kulkarni
- Yashu W Surekha
- Abhay Chavan
- Sima Samarth
- Suhas Munde
- Dhammadip Kamble
- Janhavi Avinash Kambikar

== Production ==
After the release, Karhade decided to change the end of the film from a strong negative response from audience members.

== Soundtrack ==
Baban

Soundtrack album by Harshit Abhiraj, Onkarswaroop.
- Released: 2018
- Genre: Feature film soundtrack
- Language: Marathi
- The Songs become popular includes"Saaj Hyo Tuza" and "Jagnyala Pankh Futle"

No.	Title	Lyrics	Music	Singer(s)
01	"Saaj Hyo Tuza"	Suhas Munde	Onkarswaroop	Onkarswaroop
02	"Jagnyala Pankh Futle"	Dr. Vinayak Pawar	Harsshit Abhiraj	Onkarswaroop, Anwesshaa
03	"Mohrachya Darawar"	Dr. Vinayak Pawar	Onkarswaroop	Sunidhi Chauhan, Shalmali Kholgade
04	"Godi Madhachi"	Suhas Munde	Onkarswaroop	Onkarswaroop, Anweshaa
05	"Shrawan Mahina"	Dr. Vinayak Pawar	Harsshit Abhiraj	Anweshaa

== Reception ==
=== Critical reception ===
Ganesh Matkari of Pune Mirror called "The narrative keeps hitting and missing alternately throughout the duration of Baban, finally concluding on an unsatisfactory note". according to lokmat "Baban does not satisfies the audience expectations"

=== Box office ===
The film collected ₹3.25 crore (US$350,000) in its opening weekend and ₹8.5 crore (US$910,000) in 10 days. The film collected around ₹15 crore (US$1.6 million) in its 50-day run.
