= Akhilesh Jaiswal =

Indian film director and screenwriter (born 1986)

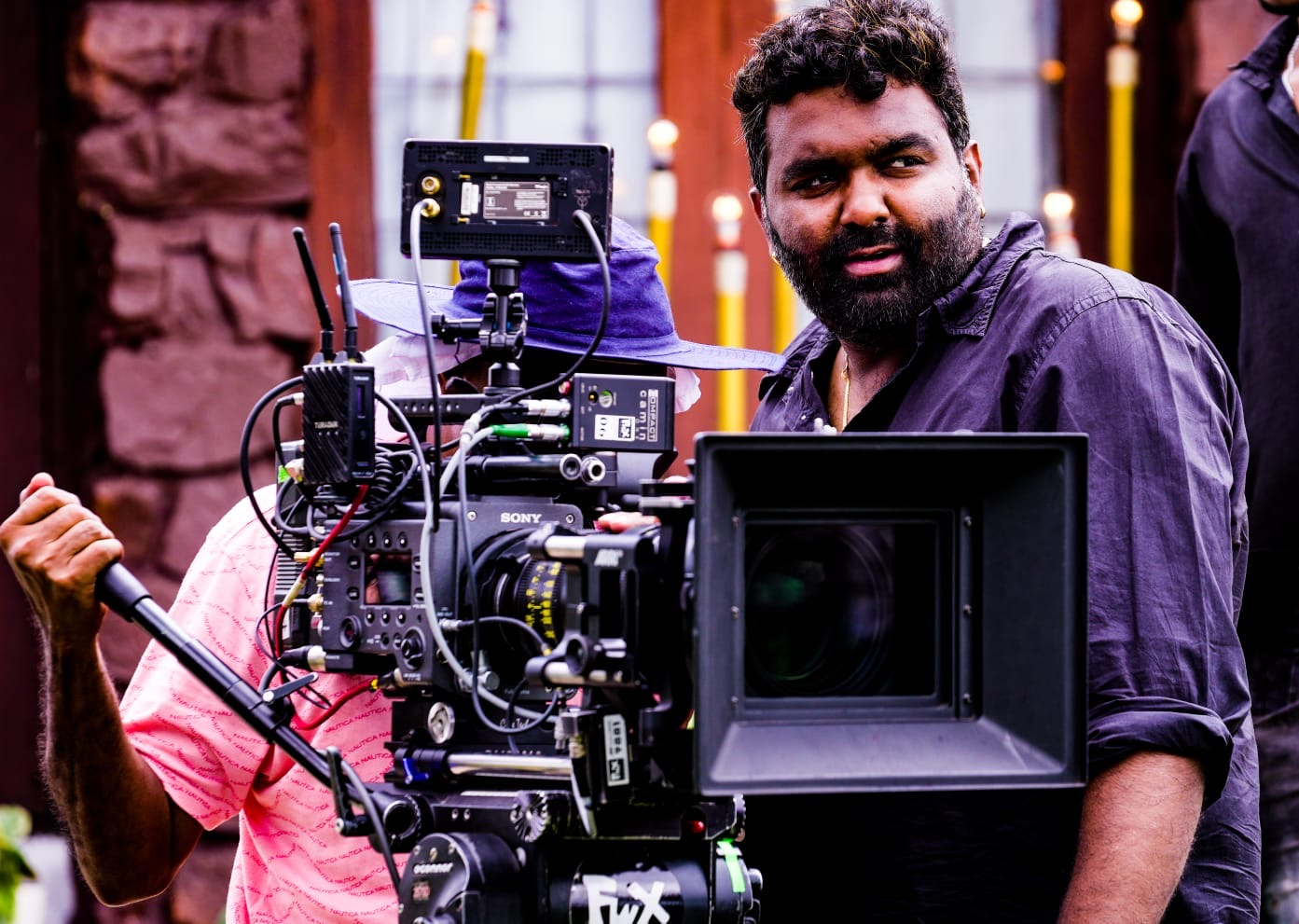
- Occupations: Film director, screenwriter
- Years active: 2012–present

Akhilesh Jaiswal is an Indian film director and screenwriter.

== Career ==
Jaiswal says he always wanted to be a film maker. He got his big break when he got the opportunity to co-write Anurag Kashyap's 'Gangs of Wasseypur'. He made his directorial debut with Mastram, which released on 9 May 2014.

Akhilesh directed Ballabhpur Ki Roopkatha a web-adaptation of Badal Sarkar's classic, by the same name.

He has also helmed the story and screenwriting of ‘Simple Murder’ a web series which got released on 20 Nov 20

== Filmography ==
=== Director ===
- Mastram (2014)
- Ballabhpur Ki Roopkatha (web-adaptation of Badal Sarkar's classic) (2017)
- Bawri Chhori(2021)
- Starfish (2023)

=== Writer ===
- Gangs of Wasseypur - Part 1 (2012)
- Gangs of Wasseypur - Part 2 (2012)
- Mastram (2014)
- Ugly (Additional writer) (2014)
- A Simple Murder (2020)
