= 1232 KMS =

- Promotional poster
- Directed by: Vinod Kapri
- Written by: Vinod Kapri
- Produced by: Bhagirathi Joshi; Sakshi Joshi
- Cinematography: Manav Yadav
- Edited by: Hemanti Sarkar
- Music by: Vishal Bhardwaj
- Production company: Bhagirathi Films
- Distributed by: Disney+ Hotstar
- Release date: 24 March 2021
- Running time: 86 minutes
- Country: India
- Language: Hindi

1232 KMS is a 2021 Indian Hindi-language documentary film directed by Vinod Kapri. It chronicles the Indian migrant workers during the COVID-19 pandemic and the impact of the lockdown on them. The film was released on Disney+ Hotstar on 24 March 2021.

== Production ==
In March 2020, India went into a nationwide lockdown to prevent the spread of the COVID-19 virus. During that time, Kapri was helping seven migrant labourers from Ghaziabad with food and other essentials. But they would keep calling him after 3–4 days felt it was "embarrassing". The next time the ration ran out, they decided to leave for their village in Saharsa which was 1232 km away from Ghaziabad. On 27 April, seven of them had left. Kapri left with his associate director Manav Yadav in a car the next morning and found them near Sambhal.

Kapri said "I advised them not to move out, holding them on for two weeks. When they decided to leave for Bihar, I wanted to document their journey." Over the next week, the labourers traveled to their village on bicycles and hitchhiked trucks with minuscule money. Kapri felt that society failed them during the crisis, "these people build our homes, but when there was a crisis, we ignored them. This documentary gives them a face and tells their story". Kapri shot the film with his assistant, without a proper crew.

== Music ==
1232 KMS

Soundtrack album by Vishal Bhardwaj
- Released: 28 March 2021
- Genre: Soundtrack
- Length: 12:25
- Label: VB Music
- Producer: Vishal Bhardwaj

Vishal Bhardwaj chronology
Sonchiriya (2019)	1232 KMS (2021)	Darlings (2021)

Vishal Bhardwaj composed "Marenge Toh Wahin Jaakar" and "O Re Bidesiya" with Gulzar writing the lyrics. Gulzar initially had written a poem on the plight of the migrant labourers which he tweaked to make it lyrical. The album released on 28 March 2021, featured three tracks; one being a reprised version of "O Re Bidesiya". Sukhwinder Singh, Vishal and Rekha Bhardwaj contributed the vocals.

Track listing
No.	Title	Singer(s)	Length
1.	"Marenge To Wahin Jaakar"	Sukhwinder Singh, Vishal Bhardwaj	4:16
2.	"O Re Bidesiya"	Rekha Bhardwaj	3:40
3.	"O Re Bidesiya (Reprise)"	Sukhwinder Singh, Vishal Bhardwaj	4:29
Total length:			12:25

== Release ==
The official trailer of 1232 KMS was released on YouTube on 17 March 2021, and opened to positive response from critics and viewers. The film was released through Disney+ Hotstar on 24 March 2021, as the announcement of the nationwide lockdown to curb COVID-19 pandemic, happened on the same date. (Note: The nationwide lockdown to curb COVID-19 was announced by Indian Prime Minister Narendra Modi on 24 March 2020.)

== Reception ==
Tatsam Mukherjee of Firstpost opined "In a country, where most news channels with far-reaching impact have let this crisis unfold in the background without any coverage, 1232 km lies in an enviable position without a contemporary film tackling a similar theme." Nandini Ramnath writing for Scroll.in said, "The 86-minute documentary is a timely reminder of the perilous journeys of migrants during the 2020 lockdown". Giving 4 out of 5 stars, Roktim Rajpal of Deccan Herald stated 1232 KMS documentary is "hard-hitting" and a wise approach as it makes the documentary a lot more relatable. Shubham Kulkarni of Koimoi stated "It isn't just another documentary that's preachy and self-indulgent. It is an effort to show you what the pandemic looked like for the people neglected." Film critic Rhea Srivatsava gave 3 out of 5 in her review for LetsOTT stating "The film deserves one watch, even if it is to get off our privileged positions and see the damage and devastation of the pandemic beyond people's lives because it is one that will linger on for the unforeseeable future."

Roktim Rajpal from Deccan Chronicle gave a rating of 4/5. Amar Ujala rated the film 4/5.
