= Vasudevan =

Vasudevan is a given name and surname. Notable people with the name are:

== Given name ==
- Vasudevan Baskaran, former field hockey player from India
- Gobichettypalayam Vasudevan Loganathan (1954–2007), Indian-born American professor at Virginia Tech, United States
- M. T. Vasudevan Nair (born 1933), known as MT, Indian author, screenplay writer and film director
- Madavoor Vasudevan Nair, veteran Kathakali artiste, recipient of the Padma Bhushan award from the government of India
- P. K. Vasudevan Nair (1926–2005), known as PKV, the 9th Chief Minister of Kerala and a senior leader of the Communist Party of India (CPI)
- Nelliyode Vasudevan Namboodiri, Kathakali artiste noted for chuvanna thaadi (red beard) roles in classical Kerala dance-drama
- Kadammanitta Vasudevan Pillai, Padayani exponent from Kerala, India
- Vayala Vasudevan Pillai (1945–2011), Malayalam-language playwright from Kerala
- AV Vasudevan Potti (born 1951), lyricist in both the Malayalam film industry and Hindu devotional song industry
- Vasudevan Srinivas (born 1958), Indian mathematician who specialises in algebraic geometry

== Surname ==
- Ash Vasudevan, the Founding Managing Partner of Edge Holdings, LLC
- Damodaran M. Vasudevan, the Dean of the College of Medicine at Amrita Vishwa Vidyapeetham, Kochi, India
- Malaysia Vasudevan (1944–2011), Tamil playback singer and actor in the Tamil film industry
- Meera Vasudevan (born 1982), Indian film actress and model
- Neyyattinkara Vasudevan (1940–2008), Carnatic music vocalist from Kerala in south India
- S. Vasudevan (born 1955), former captain of Tamil Nadu cricket team
- Shakthi Vasudevan (born 1983), Tamil film actor
- Srinivasan Vasudevan (born 1962), retired Indian professional tennis player
- Sujith Vasudevan, better known as Sharreth, music director and singer
- T. E. Vasudevan, Indian film producer, mainly in Malayalam

== See also ==
- Vasudeva
