= Pyre (film) =

2024 Indian film by Vinod Kapri

- Film poster
- Directed by: Vinod Kapri
- Written by: Vinod Kapri
- Produced by: Sakshi Joshi; Vinod Kapri
- Starring: Padam Singh; Hira Devi
- Cinematography: Manas Bhattacharyya
- Edited by: Patricia Rommel; Subhajit Singha
- Music by: Mychael Danna; Amritha Vaz
- Production companies: Bhagirathi Films; Mashakbeen Studios
- Distributed by: Cinépolis
- Release dates: 19 November 2024 (Tallinn); 30 October 2026 (India)
- Running time: 115 minutes
- Country: India
- Language: Hindi
- Budget: est. 2.5 crore
- Box office: 3.34 crore

Pyre is a 2024 Indian Hindi language drama film directed and written by Vinod Kapri. It follows octogenarian couple, Padam Singh and Tulsi Devi, as they navigate illness and financial scarcity living in a remote kumaoni village.

Pyre had its world premiere at the 28th Tallinn Black Nights Film Festival in the Official Competition section, where it won the best film PÖFF Audience Award. Pyre was also the opening film at 16th Bengaluru International Film Festival, marking its Indian premiere, and has won the Jury Special Mention Award in the Asian Cinema Competition section. Pyre also won the Best Film Audience Award in Spain, London, and Birmingham, and recently, Pyre won the Best Feature Film Grand Jury Award in Stuttgart, Germany.

The film features the song Jhir Jhir Baras Rahe ho Badra written by Gulzar and sung by Shruti Sadolikar.

== Plot ==
In a remote village in Kumaon region, Uttarakhand, an 80-year-old man named Padam Singh Rawat walks through the mountainous terrain, beating a small drum and invoking gods and goddesses in a shaky folk tune or Jagariyas. His frail wife, Tulsi, follows him, wearing dirty old clothes. The two elderly figures navigate steep, rocky paths, their journey seemingly aimless, until Padam suddenly suggests that they close their eyes and jump off a cliff together.

Padam and Tulsi are among the last residents of their slowly disappearing village, where only seven other villagers remain. With little to do, the couple passes time bickering, singing Kumaoni folk songs, and sharing simple joys, Padam drinks while Tulsi smokes beedi.

Once Padam discovers that Tulsi has fallen gravely ill, he calls upon the village's last young men, Jeevan and Laxman, to carry her down to a doctor. In return, he offers the two men goats, his only possessions of value. The doctor asks Padam to bring Tulsi to the hospital every ten days for treatment and informs him that Tulsi's has lost her will to live. Padam Singh seeks the help of Jeevan and Laxman to make the trips, both agree but ask him to make other arrangements as both plan to migrate soon.

One day, the village postman, Bishan, delivers news that Jeevan has been selected for a job in Bombay, and Laxman, too, plans to leave after two months. Padam realizes that with their departure, he and Tulsi will have no one left to help them.

Just as despair settles in, Bishan brings a long-awaited letter from their son, Hariya, who has not contacted them since he went to Mumbai 28 years ago. In the letter Hariya apologizes for his absence and promises to visit on the 5th of the next month. Tulsi, filled with renewed hope, prepares a feast for the remaining villagers to celebrate and appears to have gained back her vitality. They decorate their home, offer prayers at the temple, and wait eagerly for their son's arrival. Meanwhile a cloudburst warning plays on the radio warning of heavy rains and landslides. A portion of the house collapses.

Seventeen days later, the promised day comes and goes with no sign of Hariya. As the rain pours down, Tulsi weeps, while Padam reassures her, though doubt lingers in his own heart.

Days later, another letter arrives. Hariya explains he couldn't come due to his daughter having fallen ill but promises to visit on the 11th instead. Once again, hope is rekindled. In the meantime, Jeevan leaves for his jobs.The 11th passes with no sign of Hariya, and rain follows.

Realising Laxman is going to leave soon Padam Singh takes Tulsi he chants prayers, beating his drum, and asks Tulsi to follow him up the valley to jump together, ensuring neither has to live alone and Laxman will take care of their funerary rites before leaving. She dismisses his idea, focusing instead on making dinner for the two of them. On his return Padam singh begins preparing a Pyre realising he would not be able to take Tulsi to the river bank for Cremation. Rain follows and another portion of the house collapses

Laxman and his family depart soon after. The only other couple left inform Padam that they will be leaving soon as their daughter has called upon them to live with her in the city. Padam sets up another Pyre that evening, this one for himself.

The couple loses hope of Hariya returning. The weight of abandonment settles in. Padam pronounces they have both have gone missing. One day Tulsi wakes up alone and discovers Padam sat ontop of a Pyre. She nudges him to get up but discovers that he is unresponsive. Despair settles in as she mourns her husband's death while rain pours relentlessly over his corpse. A few days later Tulsi realises no one will come and cremates him, when the rain ceases.

Bishan arrives on a sunny morning sometime after. He looks for the couple and discovers the couple's house has collapsed completely and the remains of Padam Singh's pyre. In an effort to comfort Tulsi he tells her another letter from Hariya has arrived. Tulsi in response asks him to stop bringing forged letters from Hariya from now on. She reveals she had known that Padam Singh had been sending her the letters. When Bishan enquires how she had known Tulsi reveals that she had received a letter 28 years ago informing her of Hariya's death in train accident and had chosen not to tell Padam Singh about it to spare his feelings.

In the last scene Tulsi appears to leave her home without any of her belongings, taking only her herd of goats.

== Cast ==
- Padam Singh Kapri as Padam
- Hira Devi as Tulsi
- Subhash Chandra as Laxman
- Shubham Chaudhary as Jeewan
- Sadab Khan as Bishan
- Alok Verma as Kesar
- Gopa Nayal as Kamala
- Deewan Kanwal as Bhopal
- Jaya Shah as Devki
- Pushpa Pandey as Janki

== Production and themes ==
In 2018, Kapri came across a facebook post by writer Ashok Pandey, which prompted Kapri's curiosity about the man in the post. Kapri and Pandey then travelled to Munsiyari where they met the man, Kesar Singh, and his wife. Through conversation with the couple Kapri pinned down their concern for the surviving partner, most notably how the surviving spouse will get cremated upon their eventual death. Later that year Kapri set out with a small crew to film their story and wrote the first draft en route from Delhi to Munsiari, though Kapri and his crew abandoned the project on the 10th day of filiming after realising the couple's unsuitability for the project.

Kapri attempted casting older theatre and cinema actors in Uttarakhand but found no one suitable. Parallel cinema veteran Naseeruddin and Ratna Pathak Shah, were considered for the role but ultimately decided against when Shah pointed out his own unsuitability for the role after considering the distinct kumaoni cultural background the film needed, prompting Kapri to resume his search for pahadi actors.

In 2022, Kapri hosted a birthday party his father, in which he invited relatives and surviving friends. Drunk, an uncle offered to play the role Kapri had been searching for and performed a scene for the party. Impressed, Kapri decided to cast the man, Padam Singh, a retired Havaldar and non actor as the lead for his movie. Padam Singh's wife was considered for the role, but the idea was dropped after she declined to act, though the couple's day to day life and chemistry provided inspiration for several elements in the movie. For the female lead, Kapri began a look for a confident woman who would match Padam Singh's charm. Eventually Kapri found that in Hira Devi.

== Reception ==
Asian Movie Pulse described Pyre as "a haunting, beautiful story that resonates deeply, leaving a lasting impact that lingers long after the screen fades to black." The publication highlighted the film's meditative pacing and emotionally resonant narrative, calling it a powerful reminder of the fragility of life and the resilience of love. DMovies noted the dual symbolism of the mountainous setting, stating, "The mountains hold the key to the film's most important takeaway. Their function is double-edged: they provide our protagonists with physical and emotional nurture, while also imprisoning them." The review praised the film's quiet philosophical undertones and its patient observation of an ageing couple on the fringes of society.

El Perfil focused on the strength of the performances by the lead actors—both senior citizens and non-professionals—remarking on how their lived-in presence brought an unmatched realism to the screen. Eye For Film wrote: "There's a raw authenticity to the performances from the non-professional stars, who feel as fully part of this landscape as the scoring from Mychael Danna and Amritha Vaz. There's also a gentle absurdity, not just in the dialogue but in the way Padam takes a goat almost everywhere with him and frequently hangs his umbrella from the collar of his jacket for safekeeping."

The Indian Express called Pyre "an evocative portrait of loneliness, migration, and old age," appreciating the grounded tone and cinematic restraint. Live Hindustan praised the emotional power of the story, while The Print and The Wire noted its "unflinching realism" and "cultural authenticity."

For promotion to Uttarakhand audience, the film's marketing relied on an organic social media approach. The film's lead actors were central to promotional campaigns and promotional material would refer to them as 'aama-bubu' the Kumaoni words for grandfather and grandmother. The actors also toured and participated in various screening events across the country.

== Accolades ==
Festival Name	Premiere date	Country	Award(s) / Nomination(s)	Ref.
Tallinn Black Nights Film Festival	20 November 2024 (Opening weekend)	Estonia	Won: Best Film – Audience Award	
Bengaluru International Film Festival	1 March 2025 (Opening night film)	India	Won: Jury Special Mention – Asian Cinema Competition	
MOOOV Film Festival	25 April 2025 (Festival: 2–10 May)	Belgium	Screened with strong audience response	
New York Indian Film Festival	21 June 2025	United States	Nominated: Best Actor, Best Actress	
Asian Summer Film Festival	19 July 2025	Spain	Won: Best Film – Audience Award; Won: Jury Special Mention Award	
London Indian Film Festival	22 July 2025	United Kingdom	Won: Best Film Audience Award; Sold‑out: BFI London screenings	
Birmingham Indian Film Festival	22 July 2025	United Kingdom	Won: Best Film Audience Award; Sold‑out: Birmingham screenings	
Indian Film Festival Stuttgart	26 July 2025	Germany	Won: Grand Jury Best Feature Film Award German Star of India Award	
DC South Asian Film Festival	5 September 2025	United States	Won: Best Feature Film	
India International Film Festival of Boston	12 September 2025	United States	Won: Best Feature Film, Best Director	
Chicago South Asian Film Festival	21 September 2025	United States	Won: Fiction Feature Audience Choice Award	
Novi Sad Film Festival	18 September 2025	Serbia	Won: Best Director	
49th São Paulo International Film Festival	16 October 2025	Brazil	South American Premiere	
35th Bath Film Festival (FilmBath)	19 October 2025	United Kingdom		
44th Cambridge Film Festival	26 October 2025	United Kingdom		
23rd Inverness Film Festival	7 November 2025	Scotland	Scottish Premiere	
Mosaic International South Asian Film Festival	24 November 2025	Canada	Won: Best Feature Film Award, Best Music Award	
43rd Fajr International Film Festival	28 November2025	Iran		
30th International Film Festival of Kerala (IFFK)	13 December 2025	India		

== Release ==
The film was originally scheduled for theatrical release in India on 23 October 2026 but was later postponed to 30 October 2026. It will be distributed by Cinépolis.
