= Mastram =

2014 film directed by Akhilesh Jaiswal

- Theatrical release poster
- Directed by: Akhilesh Jaiswal
- Written by: Akhilesh Jaiswal; Gunjan Saxena
- Produced by: Sunil Bohra; Sanjeev Singh Pal; Ajay Rai
- Starring: Rahul Bagga; Tara Alisha; Soul Balaji; Vinod Nahardih; Istiyak Khan; Aakash Dahiya
- Cinematography: Gavemic U. Ary
- Edited by: Apurva Motiwale
- Music by: Yo Yo Honey Singh, Saurabh Kalsi
- Production companies: Bohra Bros Productions; Jar Pictures
- Release dates: October 2013 (Mumbai Film Festival); 9 May 2014 (India)
- Country: India
- Language: Hindi
- Budget: ₹6 crore
- Box office: est. ₹4.5 crore

Mastram (transl. Easy-going person) is a 2014 Indian Hindi-language biographical film directed by Akhilesh Jaiswal, and starring Rahul Bagga and Tara Alisha Berry. The film is about an aspiring litterateur turning into an initially reluctant finally full-fledged pornographic writer, inspired by the anonymous author of popular pulp fiction and sex stories in Hindi, only known as Mastram. These books were sold at railway station stalls and small roadside and pavement shops in North India through the 1980s and 90s. Jaiswal makes his directorial debut with the film. The film also marks the debut of actress Tara Alisha Berry. The film features rapper Yo Yo Honey Singh's Gujarati Single "Achko Machko" and is also the theme song of the movie's trailer which was released on 14 Feb 2014 by Bohra Bros on YouTube.

The film premiered at Mumbai Film Festival in October 2013, ahead of its theatrical release on 9 May 2014.

== Plot ==
Rajaram is a small-town bank clerk who dreams of travelling to Delhi and becoming a reputed writer. His literary aspirations are supported by none except his naive wife, Renu. He finally leaves his job to become a full-time writer, but he cannot find a publisher for his book. One publisher agrees only if he adds sensational elements or masala to his dull tale. He is unable to decode what masala means until he meets Chacha, an eccentric, old village womanizer who shows him the spicier side of life. He adopts the pseudonym, Mastram, and churns out his publicly taboo erotic novel series, which become best-sellers. He slowly starts becoming successful; however, all of the credit is attributed to "Mastram," not him.

== Cast ==
- Rahul Bagga as Rajaram
- Tara Alisha Berry as Renu
- Vinod Nahardih
- Istiyak Khan as Rajaram's friend
- Aakash Dahiya as Young Guy at printing press
- Aishwarya Mehta as Bhabhi (Maakhan's wife)
- Sagar
- Benieal.R

== Filming ==
According to Director Akhilesh Jaiswal, the film stars some of the finest actors from NSD (National School of Drama) and other theatre groups. The Film has been shot at several places in North India including Manali.

== Production ==
Talking about the mystery in film, director Akhilesh Jaiswal says, "My film is a fictional account of the writer’s life. Even I am curious to know who the real brain behind the book is, or the real face behind the author, as you put it". It is not a pornographic film and he hopes to get an A Certificate from Censor Board without any cuts.

== Critical reception ==
Film critic Subhash K. Jha gave it 3 stars and said that Mastram brings a meditative melancholy to the porn writer's life. We get to meet the man behind the orgasms. We feel the pain beneath the porn.
