= Hirji S. Adenwalla =

Indian missionary (1930–2020)

Hirji Sorab Adenwalla (5 June 1930 – 27 May 2020) was an Indian missionary who joined the Jubilee Mission in Kerala, India, as a surgeon. Adenwalla turned what was originally a small dispensary into a 1500-bedded medical college and research institute called the Jubilee Mission Medical College. Adenwalla specialized in cleft lip and cleft palate surgeries, providing treatment at low or no cost to more than 21,000 patients. Adenwalla contributed several new techniques to the cleft lip surgery, such as a method to avoid a vermillion notch, a protocol for cleft lip nose correction in unilateral cleft lips, and a procedure for septal repositioning.

== Personal life ==
Adenwalla was born in the city of Ahmednagar in Maharashtra, India, to a Parsi family. In 1955, he completed his graduate and postgraduate studies in surgery at the King Edward Memorial Hospital and Seth Gordhandas Sunderdas Medical College, where his father was the dean. Afterwards, Adenwalla worked as a surgeon at the Bai Jerbai Wadia Hospital for Children in Mumbai, where he gained experience in pediatric and plastic surgery under the mentorship of Charles Pinto, a surgeon at the hospital who specialized in cleft lip and palate surgeries.

== Career ==
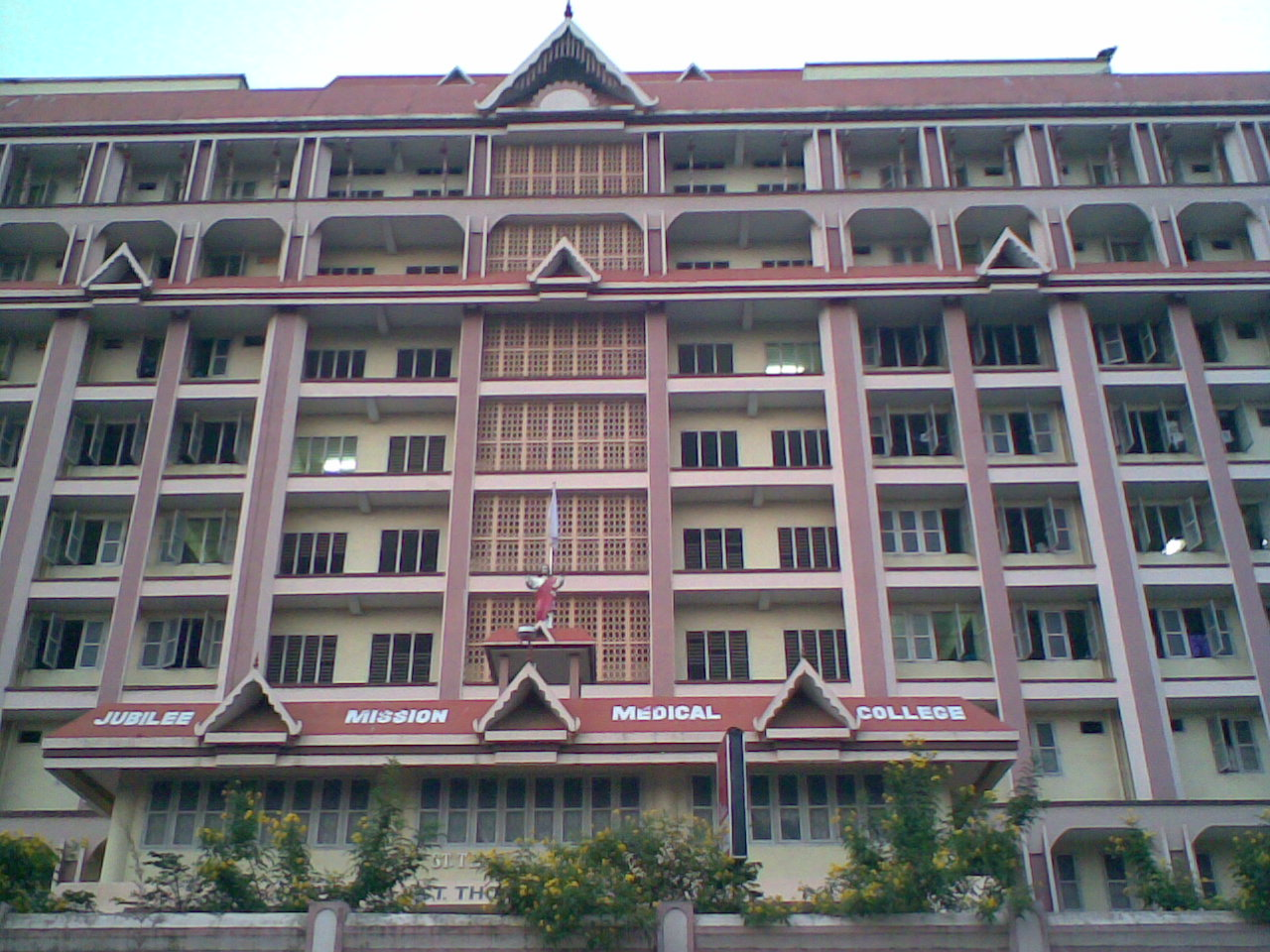
Jubilee Mission Medical College

Adenwalla had planned to join the physician and theologian Albert Schweitzer in his mission in Africa. But when Adenwalla met his wife, Gulnar, he decided to look for missionary work in India instead. At the age of 29, Adenwalla joined the Jubilee Mission in Thrissur, in Kerala, India. He worked at the Jubilee Mission Hospital for 60 years. When Adenwalla arrived at the Jubilee Mission Hospital in 1959, the hospital was a dispensary with four rooms, 20 beds, two retired doctors, and two nurses. Adenwalla was the only surgeon at the hospital, and as a result he performed plastic surgeries, pediatric surgeries, gastrointestinal surgeries, gynecological surgeries, and orthopedic surgeries. In addition to being the general surgeon, he also served as the hospital's anesthetist, radiology technician, and urologist.

Adenwalla began recruiting and training specialists and eventually the Jubilee Mission Hospital developed into a medical college and research institute with 1500 beds. Adenwalla was then able to devote his time to specializing in cleft lip and cleft palate surgeries. He founded the Charles Pinto Centre for Cleft Lip and Palate, named after his mentor, within the Jubilee Mission Medical College. Adenwalla performed more than 21,000 cleft lip and palate surgeries, and continued to perform surgeries until the age of 90. In the beginning of his cleft palate surgery career, if patients were unable to pay for surgery, Adenwalla performed the operation for free under one of his personal funds. In 2000, Adenwalla became the Smile Train's first Indian partner, providing him the money to perform surgeries at no cost to his patients.

== Legacy ==
Adenwalla contributed several new techniques to the cleft lip surgery. He introduced a protocol to avoid a vermillion notch and a protocol for cleft lip nose correction in unilateral cleft lips. He also pioneered a method for repairing the nasal deformity during cleft lip surgery, at a time when few surgeons attempted to do so over concerns of causing a growth disturbance of the nose. Adenwalla hypothesized that the absence of amino acids resulting from protein deficiency in food was the main cause of cleft lip and palate deformities.

=== Awards ===
He received the Joseph McCarthy Award for Excellence in Medicine and Humanitarian Services in November, 2006. Adenwalla represented India on the Medical Advisory Board for Smile Train New York and was a member of the Advisory Committee for Smile Train India.

=== Death ===
Adenwalla died in May 2020 due to age-related ailments.
