= Jubilee Mission Medical College and Research Institute =

Hospital in India

Jubilee Mission Medical College & Research Institute
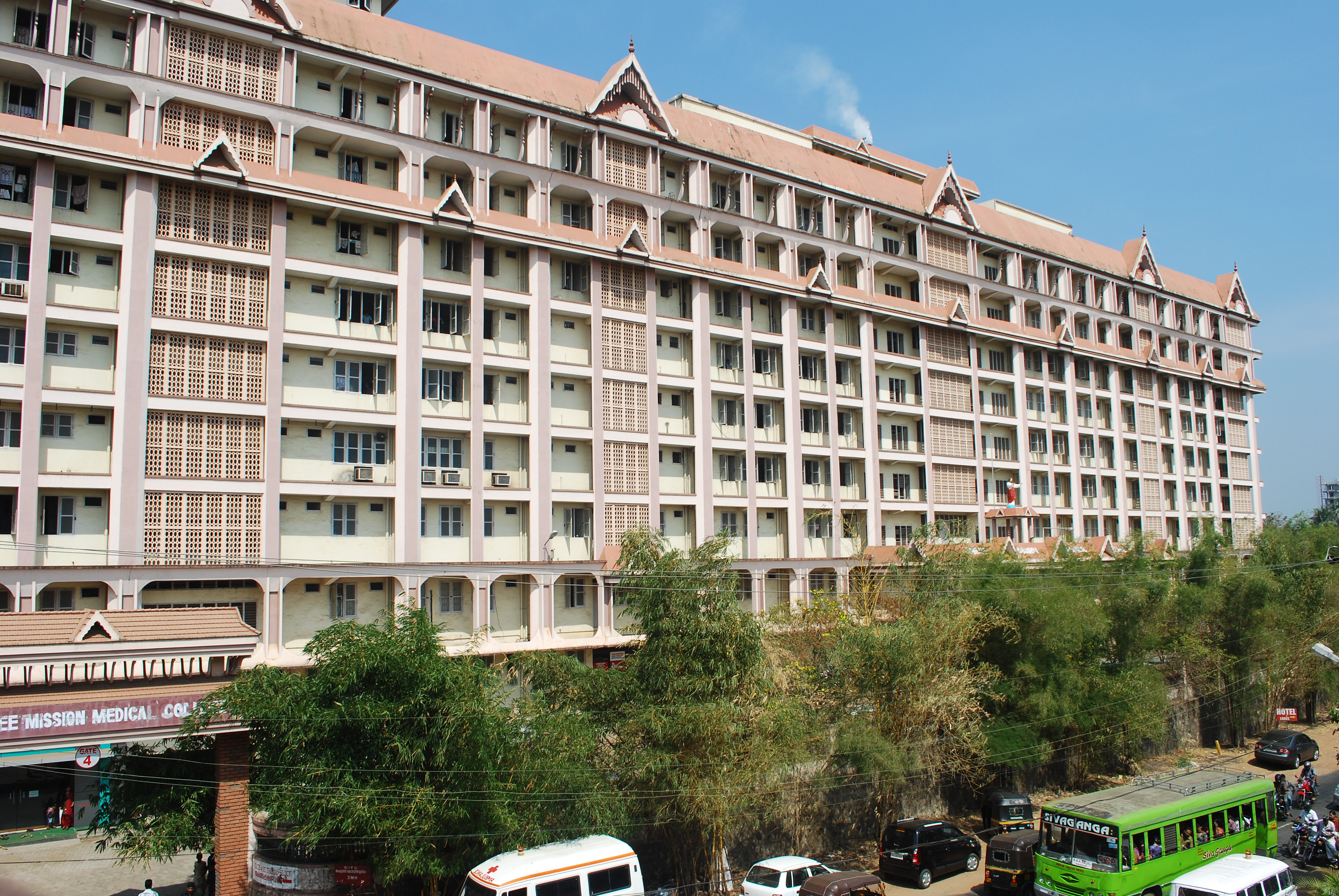
- Motto: Service with Love
- Type: Private Medical College
- Established: 17 December 1951; 74 years ago
- Founder: Rev. Mar George Alapatt
- Affiliations: National Medical Commission
- Religious affiliation: Syro Malabar Catholic
- Academic affiliations: Kerala University of Health Sciences
- Chairman: Mar Andrews Thazhath
- Principal: Dr. M. A. Andrews
- Director: Fr. Renny Mundenkurian
- Location: P.B 737, Fathima Nagar, Mahatma Nagar, Nellikunnu, Thrissur, Kerala 680005, Thrissur, Kerala, India
- Campus: Urban
- Website: www.jmmcri.org

Jubilee Mission Medical College and Research Institute is a private, non-profit Christian minority medical college, hospital and research institute located at Thrissur in Kerala, India. The establishment is administered by the Jubilee Mission Hospital Trust, a charitable organization under the Catholic Archdiocese of Thrissur.

== History ==
Jubilee Mission Hospital formerly known as the Bishop Alapatt Jubilee Memorial Hospital was established on 17 December 1951 as a small dispensary. In 1952, the hospital began its service with 4 rooms, 20 beds, 2 retired part-time doctors and 2 nurses of the Holy Cross Congregation. Under the leadership of Dr H.S. Adenwalla, the mission hospital grew to 1750 beds and is a major provider of health care services in Kerala. In 1953, Cardinal Eugène Tisserant blessed the first operating theatre. The hospital provides healthcare regardless of caste or creed, or economic status.

Nursing school commenced in 1966 and the hospital was recognized by the Medical Council of India (MCI) in 1971 for internship training of doctors. Training of post graduate medical students for the National Board of Examinations commenced in 1990. In 2003, the MCI recognized the Jubilee Mission Hospital as a teaching hospital. The institution subsequently opened the Jubilee Medical College and the Jubilee School of Nursing.

== Overview ==
=== Facilities ===
- Staff strength: 3,850
- Total beds: 1500
- Total ICU beds: 300
- Total operation theatres: 22
- Total outpatients: 1,350,000
- Total floor space: 1,295,000 ft^{2} (120,250 m^{2})

=== Campus ===
The campus is located at the heart of Thrissur city and spans almost 25 acres. It has the main hospitals blocks, medical college, administrative wings, hostels, staff quarters, and engineering wings.

The campus has facilities including libraries, reading rooms, museums, stadium, gym, table tennis hall and a chapel. Other amenities include ATMs, police outpost, post office, a branch of the South Indian Bank, various restaurants, cafes and a supermarket. The institute also runs various satellite centres throughout Thrissur district.

=== PHCs and Outreach Centres ===
The institute runs 5 PHCs and satellite hospitals in and around Thrissur

- St. Antony's Mission Hospital, Pazhuvil
- Mary Immaculate Mission Hospital, Engandiyur
- Padua Mission Hospital, Puthenpeedika
- Rural Health Centre: Mulayam
- Urban Health Centre: Nadathara

== Achievements ==
Jubilee Medical College has been consistently ranked the top medical school in the state under Kerala University of Health Sciences with regards to MBBS exam performance

The hospital started one of the first human milk banks in the state, alongside General Hospital Ernakulam.

The institute started the first interventional neurology cathlab in the district of Thrissur.

== Departments ==
The hospital includes the following departments:

=== Administrative departments ===
- Biomedical Engineering
- Central Library
- Medical Records
- Medical Education Unit

=== Clinical departments ===
- Anaesthesiology
- Anatomy
- Biochemistry
- Biostatistics
- Cardiology
- Cardiothoracic Surgery
- Clinical Psychology
- Critical Care
- Dentistry
- Dermatology
- Dietetics
- Emergency Medicine
- Endocrinology
- Forensic Medicine & Toxicology
- Gastroenterology
- General Surgery
- Head & Neck Surgery
- Immunohaematology
- Interventional Cardiology
- Internal Medicine
- Laboratory Medicine
- Microbiology
- Microvascular Surgery
- Neonatology
- Nephrology
- Neurology
- Neurosurgery
- Obstetrics & Gynaecology
- Oncology
- Oncosurgery
- Ophthalmology
- Otorhinolaryngology (ENT)
- Oral & Maxillofacial Surgery
- Pain Medicine
- Pathology
- Paediatrics
- Paediatric Surgery
- Pharmacology
- Physical Medicine & Rehabilitation
- Physiology
- Physiotherapy
- Plastic Surgery
- Preventive & Social Medicine
- Psychiatry
- Pulmonology
- Radiology
- Rheumatology
- Sleep Medicine
- Speech Therapy
- Speech Pathology
- Sports Medicine
- Surgical Oncology
- Urology
- Transfusion Medicine
- Trauma & Orthopaedic Surgery
- Vascular Surgery

=== Specialised units and facilities ===
- Blood Bank
- Burns Unit
- Dialysis Unit
- Geriatric Home Care Service
- Human Milk Bank
- Hyperbaric Oxygen Therapy Unit
- Interventional Neurology Cathlab
- RNTCP Unit & DOTS Centre
- Snakebite Unit
- Small Animal Research Laboratory

== Specialist centres ==
=== Jubilee Hrudhayalaya ===
Jubilee Hrudhayalaya is a fully integrated cardiovascular centre providing multidimensional care. It is the largest exclusive cardiac centre in the state of Kerala, having 300 dedicated cardiac beds and 80 critical care beds

=== Charles Pinto Centre for Cleft Lip and Palate ===
The Charles Pinto Centre provides care for patients with congenital clefts of the lip and palate and complex facial clefts. The department is visited by plastic surgeons from other countries. It was established by Dr. H.S. Adenwalla, who operated on about 16,000 patients with clefts at the institute.

The procedures are provided free of charge, which attracts people from all over India.

The centre has partnered with Smile Train, a charitable organisation based in New York, USA, that helps with funding for treatment of cleft patients. The Charles Pinto Centre was the first to be inspected and accepted as a partner in India by Smile Train.

=== Jubilee Institute of Surgery for Hand Aesthetic & Microsurgery (JISHAM) ===
A specialist institute led by the Department of Plastic Surgery, dealing with the surgery of hand and upper extremity, reconstructive microsurgery, cosmetic surgery, reconstruction of congenital & acquired defects of the trunk.

=== Jubilee Hyperbaric Oxygen Therapy Centre (Jubilee HBOT) ===
The Hyperbaric Oxygen Therapy Center is jointly managed by Jubilee Institute of Surgery for Hand Aesthetic & Microsurgery (JISHAM) and the Jubilee Burns Center.

=== Jubilee Institute for Tissue Engineering Research (JITER) ===
Using regenerative medicine and tissue engineered skin substitutes to develop artificial skin that can replicate normal skin. Unit has funding grants from the ER & IPR directorate at DRDO. The project is also under collaboration with College of Veterinary and Animal Sciences, Thrissur (part of the Kerala Veterinary and Animal Sciences University).

=== Jubilee Centre for Medical Research (JCMR) ===
Jubilee Centre for Medical Research (JCMR) is a DSIR recognised research centre established by the Jubilee Mission Hospital Trust. The research activities in the Jubilee institutions are now coordinated by JCMR. This research centre undertakes and promotes research projects funded by governmental agencies, NGOs and those leading to the award of degrees like MD / MS / DNB / DM / Ph.D.

Dr. D. M. Vasudevan, a well known scientist, Dr. B. C. Roy Award recipient, Biochemistry Professor and renowned author took charge as Research Director of JCMR in April 2014.

Thrust areas of research at the centre includes:

- Molecular biology and cytogenetics
- Biochemistry, microbiology and virology
- Epidemiology, public health and occupational health
- Neuroimmunology
- Clinical Medicine and Nursing
- Structural Biology
- Computational Biology
- Histology, cytology and immunohistochemistry
- Pharmacology and ethnomedicine

Specialised facilities at the centre includes:

- Cell and molecular biology facility
- Computational and structural biology lab
- Cytogenetics and genomics research lab
- Phytochemistry research division
- Biochemistry research lab
- Small animals research facility

== Academics ==
=== Academic divisions ===
The institute has the following divisions:

- Jubilee Mission Medical College Hospital (JMMCH)
- Jubilee Mission Medical College (JMMC)
- Jubilee Mission College of Nursing (JMCON)
- Jubilee Mission School of Nursing (JMSON)
- Jubilee Mission College of Allied Health Sciences (JMCAHS)
- Jubilee Centre for Medical Research (JCMR)
- Jubilee Ayurveda Mission Hospital

=== Courses offered ===
The medical college annually accepts 150 students for the MBBS undergraduate course based on performance in the national medical entrance exam NEET. The MBBS course consists of four and a half years of academic training, followed by one year of internship as a House Surgeon.

It accepts postgraduate trainees (MD/MS) in a number of specialties. In 2024, 54 postgraduate training seats were offered in the specialties of:

- Anaesthesiology (MD)
- Community Medicine (MD)
- Dermatology, Venereology & Leprosy (MD)
- Emergency Medicine (MD)
- General Medicine (MD)
- General Surgery (MS)
- Immuno-Haematology (MD)
- Microbiology (MD)
- Obstetrics and Gynaecology (MS)
- Ophthalmology (MS)
- Otorhinolaryngology (MS)
- Paediatrics (MD)
- Pathology (MD)
- Physiology (MD)
- Psychiatry (MD)
- Radiology & Radiodiagnosis (MD)
- Respiratory Medicine (MD)
- Transfusion Medicine (MD)
- Trauma & Orthopaedic Surgery (MS)

The college also accepts trainees for higher super-specialist training. Courses run currently are:

- Cardiology (DM)
- Critical Care Medicine (DM)
- Neurology (DM)
- Neurosurgery (DNB)
- Cardiothoracic and Vascular Anaesthesia (PDCC)

Other PG Medical Courses:

- Critical Care Medicine (IDCCM)
- Fellowship in Cardiothoracic Anaesthesia
- Fellowship in Neonatology
- Fellowship In Orthognathic Surgery
- Fellowship in Ultrasound Guided Regional Anaesthesia

The institute runs the IDCCM (Indian Diploma in Critical Care Medicine) programme, making it one of only two medical colleges in the state providing super specialty training in Critical Care Medicine.

Various other courses are run, including nursing and allied health professions. Courses offered include:

Nursing

- GNM Nursing & Midwifery
- BSc Nursing
- MSc Medical Surgical Nursing
- MSc Pediatric Nursing
- MSc Community Health Nursing
- MSc Fundamental & Mental Health Nursing
- Post-Basic Diploma Cardiothoracic Nursing
- PG Diploma in various nursing clinical specialties

Allied Health Professions

- Diploma in Anaesthesia Technology.
- Diploma in Medical Records Technology
- Diploma In Medical Imaging Technology
- Diploma in Medical Laboratory Technology
- Diploma In Optometry

== Student life ==
Student life revolves around various aspects in the college, including:

- Students' Council - an annually elected students' union
- Ashraya Charitable Society
- Jubilee Campus Radio
- Jubilee Quest - Student run society to promote research among students
- Jubilee Techies
- Kanal - Literary Club
- NaVaRaSa - Arts Club
- Campus Ground & Sports Courts
- Students' Gym
- Various eateries within campus
- Campus supermarket, cafes, libraries and ATMs

== Notable alumni ==
- Dr. Alby John, IAS, District Collector of Tiruvallur District and was All India Rank 4 in the UPSC

== Notable faculty ==
- Dr. D.M.Vasudevan, Director of Jubilee Centre for Medical Research
- Dr. H.S.Adenwalla
- Dr. Fr. Francis Alappatt, Founder director and pioneer of blood donation campaign in Kerala

== JUBICON ==
JUBICON is the annual national medical students' conference held at Jubilee Mission Medical College and Research Institute. It is organised and conducted by the various student clubs (NaVaRaSa, Jubilee Techies, Jubilee Quest, Kanal), a student run charity NGO (Ashraya Charitable Society), and Jubilee Centre for Medical Research (JCMR). It intends to facilitate students oriented towards research and develop them into scientific thinkers. JUBICON brings together experts in the fields of research and advanced technologies.

== Community services ==
A range of services are provided by the staff and volunteers from the institute.

== Educational workshops and courses ==
Jubilee has various workshops and courses annually, which are conducted by specialised departments.

Department of Emergency Medicine

- AUTLS- AIIMS Ultrasound Trauma Life Support
- BASIC - Basic Assessment & Support in Intensive Care
- BLS - Basic Life Support Course
- ACLS - Advanced Cardiac Life Support Course
- BECC - Basic Emergency Care Course
- First Responder Course

Department of Immunohaematology

- CASCADE Workshop - A coagulation workshop conducted annually

Department of Obstetrics & Gynaecology

- FOCUS Training Programme

=== Public health programmes ===
Some of the key programmes:

Department of Community Medicine

- Immunisation Camps
- Health Education Camps
- School Health Programmes
- Various Public Health Awareness Camps
- Blood Donation Camps

Department of Immunohaematology

- Blood Donation Camps

Department of Ophthalmology

- Eye Checkup Camps
- Eye Donation Camps
- Public Eye Health Awareness Camps

== See also ==
- List of medical colleges in India
- List of largest hospital campuses
