= Khwada =

- Official Poster
- ख्वाडा
- Directed by: Bhaurao Karhade
- Written by: Bhaurao Karhade
- Produced by: Vitthal Karhade
- Starring: Bhausaheb Shinde; Shashank Shende; Anil Nagarkar
- Cinematography: Veerdhal Patil
- Edited by: Rohan Patil
- Music by: Rohit Nagbhide
- Production company: Chitraksha Films
- Release date: 22 October 2015
- Country: India
- Language: Marathi

Khwada ('Obstacle') is a 2015 Indian Marathi-language film, written and directed by Bhaurao Karhade in a directorial debut. The executive producer was Mangesh Bhimraj Jondhale.

In the 62nd National Award Ceremony the film received two awards; ‘Special Jury Mention’ and ‘Sync Sound’. It has also won 5 state awards, for Best Debut Film Production, Best Rural Film, Best Costume Design, Best Rural Director and Best Make-Up. In 2015's edition of Pune International Film Festival, Karhade won the award for Best Director. The film also won Best Film, Best Director, Best Debutant Actor, and Best Actor in a Negative Role at Prabhat Film Awards. The film was released theatrically on Dussehra festival day (22 October 2015).

== Plot ==
Fighting a legal battle for over 10 years in the hope of getting back his land from the forest department, the film tells the story of Raghu Karhe who, along with his wife, two sons Panda and Balu, his daughter-in-law and grandson, all wander while shepherding sheep from one village to another.

Balu, a budding wrestler and a daydreamer, foreseeing prosperity and a future in agriculture hopes to find his family a permanent settlement instead of day-to-day wandering.

Fate brings them to a village headed by the rowdy, Ashokrao, who along with his fellow wrestlers terrorizes all the adjoining villages and very often creates trouble by picking up the sheep of poor shepherds. Balu and his family bear everything silently.

In one of the wrestling competitions, Balu defeats Ashokrao's academy's wrestlers, which leads to animosity between him and Balu. Ashokrao compels Balu to a wrestle with his ace wrestler. Feeling the pain of Ashokrao's separatist remarks, Balu applies his full strength and breaks the wrestler's spine and runs away. This further hurts Ashokrao's ego who vows to finish him. Balu's angst for finding resolution culminates in a heart-wrenching climax of the film.

Through its protagonist, the film talks about the entire shepherd community and how their lives are unstable, full of challenges and how at times, they have to pay a heavy price for survival with dignity.

== Cast ==
- Shashank Shende as Raghu Karhe
- Bhausaheb Shinde as Balu
- Prashant Ingale as Panda
- Anil Nagarkar as Ashokrao
- Surekha
- Yogesh Dimbale
- Rasika Chavhan
- Vaishnavi Dhore
- Chandrakant Dhumal
- Vaishali Kendale
- Amol Thorat
- Hemat Kadam

== Production ==
Executive Producer Mangesh Bhimraj Jondhale & Bhaurao Karhade unable to find producers sells his land for the funding of the film. Everyone in his family was shocked at the idea but Bhaurao Karhade managed to influence his family members. Bhaurao from the draught-hit Shrigonda taluka of Ahmednagar district sold his land to raise Rs 85 lakh to produce a movie.

== Publicity ==
Khwada used innovative publicity design to promote the film. The cartoons are drawn by famous cartoonist Uday Mohite. The cartoons have become instantly viral on social media platforms. Uday Mohite has earlier done some publicity cartoons for films like Balak Palak and Timepass 2

== Awards and festivals ==
Official Selections:

Festival / Awards	Category	Result
62nd National Film Awards	National Film Award – Special Jury Award / Special Mention (Feature Film)	Won
62nd National Film Awards	National Film Award for Best Audiography • Location Sound Recordist	Won
Maharashtra State Film Award	Best Debut Producer	Won
Maharashtra State Film Award	Best Costume	Won
Maharashtra State Film Award	Maharashtra State Film Award for Best Rural Film	Won
Maharashtra State Film Award	Best Makeup	Won
Pune International Film Festival	Best Director	Won
6th Chitra Padarpan Purskar	Best Production Value : Mangesh Jondhale	Nominated
Prabhat Purskar 2015	Best Film	Won
Prabhat Purskar 2015	Best Director	Won
Prabhat Purskar 2015	Best Debut Male - Bhau Shinde	Won
Prabhat Purskar 2015	Best Negative Role - Anil Nagarkar	Won
Sanskruti Kala Darpan	Best Actor - Shashank Shende	Won
Marathi Film Fare	Best Debut Director - Bhaurao Karadhe	Won
Marathi Film Fare	Best Sound - Mahaveer Sabbanwar	Won

== Reception ==
Film received extremely positive reviews from critics. ABP Majha gave 4 out of 5 stars and declared movie 'Survival of the fittest'. The Pune Mirror gave it 4 out of 5 stars and said "For films like this climax always prove to be tricky. It can be either depressing or unrealistic in most cases. Khwada successfully manages to avoid both and reaches a satisfactory conclusion; it keeps the narrative real and yet takes things to a higher level". The Maharashtra Times gave it 4 out of 5 stars and called it a "spicy desi Maharshtrian dish ". The Times of India also gave it 4 out of 5 stars, saying it was "a realistic look at the life of a shepherd family and the obstacles they face while struggling to make ends meet".
