= Francis Alappatt =

Indian priest and doctor

Francis Alappat (died 8 April 2026) was an Indian Catholic priest, physician, author, and healthcare administrator from Thrissur, Kerala. Known as a "Doctor Priest" for his unusual dual career in medicine and the clergy, he served as the Vicar General of the Archdiocese of Thrissur and was the founding director of the Jubilee Mission Medical College. He was also the founder of the Blood Donors Forum and campaigned to make blood group registration mandatory in SSLC books in Kerala. A prolific writer, he authored over 50 books.

== Early life and education ==
Francis Alappat was born in Thrissur as the son of Rosy and Antony of the Alappat family. He received his early education at Sacred Heart School and Model Boys High School, and attended St. Thomas College, Thrissur. He earned his MBBS degree from Kozhikode Medical College. Following his medical studies, he obtained degrees in philosophy and theology and was ordained as a priest in 1995.

== Career ==
=== Medical and administrative roles ===
Alappat served as the founding director of the Jubilee Mission Medical College, Nursing College, Paramedical Institute, and the Thrissur Institute of Mental Health Sciences. He also served as president of Jubilee Mission Medical College and director of the Engandiyoor Mary Immaculate Hospital.

He was a member of the Monitoring Committee appointed by the Kerala High Court for the Mental Health Hospital, and served on the Advisory Committees for the Thrissur District Hospital, Thrissur Medical College, and the Koratty Government Leprosy Institute. He served as the chairman of the Indian Red Cross Society.

=== Blood donation advocacy ===
Alappat founded the Blood Donors Forum and led a campaign that resulted in blood group registration being made mandatory in SSLC books in Kerala, which was considered a significant milestone for emergency medicine in the state. He also directed a documentary on blood donation titled Poovithal Pozhiyumbol.

=== Priestly ministry ===
Throughout his career, Alappat served as a parish priest in several parishes under the Archdiocese of Thrissur, including Pavaratty, Eravimangalam, Kannamkulangara, Vijayapuram, Kolangattukara, and Nehrunagar. He rose to the position of Vicar General of the Archdiocese of Thrissur. He also held the positions of Chairman of Santhwanam and Patron of Satsang.

== Literary and creative works ==
Alappat authored over 50 books in Malayalam and English. His notable works include his autobiography Kasa Muthal Cadaver Vare (From Chalice to Cadaver), Ilanjipoomanam Ozhuki Varunnu, Daivavachanam – Dhyanikkanum Jeevikkanum, Vivaha Vediyilekku, Blood is Thicker than Water, Subhashithangal, Nombukaala Chinthakal, Raghava-Krishna, Avalkkoppam, The Unfathomable (a biography), and The Unreal Love.

He also directed the short film Ormakalkappuram, starring T. G. Ravi.

== Death ==
Alappat died on 8 April 2026 in Thrissur. He was survived by his siblings Johnson and Mary.
