= TDM (film) =

- Theatrical release poster
- Directed by: Bhaurao Karhade
- Written by: Bikhu Devkate
- Produced by: Bhaurao Karhade; Indrabhan Karhe; B.Devkate
- Starring: Pruthviraj Thorat; Kalindi Nistane
- Cinematography: Veerdhaval Patil
- Edited by: Pavan Theurkar
- Music by: Vaibhav Shirole; Onkarswaroop Bagde
- Production companies: Chitraksha Films; Smile Stone Studio
- Distributed by: UFO Moviez
- Release date: 28 April 2023
- Country: India
- Language: Marathi

TDM (Note: The title's expanded form is Tractor Driver of Mahindra) is a 2023 Indian Marathi-language comedy film directed by Bhaurao Karhade. The film is jointly produced by Chitraksha Films and Smile Stone Studio, and distributed by UFO Moviez. The film was theatrically released on 28 April 2023.

== Cast ==
- Prithviraj Thorat
- Kalindi Nistane
- Sheetal Patil
- Rohit More
- Prabhakar Mathapati
- Rushi Vilas Kale
- Bhaurao Karhade

== Release ==
TDM was released on 28 April 2023 throughout Maharashtra. Initially film was set to be released on 3 February 2023. The film faced limited theater screenings. The makers personally engaged with the audience, while the cast expressed their dissatisfaction with the situation.

== Critical reception ==
Anup George of The Times of India rated 3.0/5 and write "TDM is well-executed and contains some sincere character moments. Even if the first half drags a little, it makes you care about the characters. As the charming Babu, Pruthviraj Thorat does a fantastic job. It definitely touches the heart and the audience genuinely becomes invested in his life. In the second half of the movie, Kalindi Nistane really shines." Kalpeshraj Kubal of Maharashtra Times gave positive review and wrote "The debutants Prithviraj Thorat and Kalindi Nistane in the lead roles have done a great job. The film does the job of capturing the emotions of the human being in various ways." Sakal have praised the soundtrack album said that: "The songs in the film take the film forward and if they are removed from the film, it will be like removing the soul of the film", and criticised the screenplay. Saurav Mahind of Urbanly gave 2.5/5 rating and praised story, music and cinematography.

== Soundtrack ==
TDM

Soundtrack album by Vaibhav Shirole, Onkarswaroop, Rohit Nagbhide
- Released: 28 April 2023
- Genre: Feature film soundtrack
- Length: 22:56
- Language: Marathi
- Label: Chitraksha Music

The music is composed by Onkarswaroop Bagde, Rohit Nagbhide, Vaibhav Shirole, while score is provided by Sarang Kulkarni.

All lyrics are written by Vinayak Pawar.

Track listing
No.	Title	Lyrics	Music	Singer(s)	Length
1.	"Bakula"	Vinayak Pawar	Onkarswaroop	Nandesh Umap, Priyanka Barve, Onkarswaroop	4:38
2.	"Ek Phool"	Vinayak Pawar	Rohit Nagbhide	Onkarswaroop, Priyanka Barve	5:48
3.	"Pingla Gato Raja Shivrayanchi Gatha"	Dashrath Bhaurao Shirole	Vaibhav Shirole	Vaibhav Shirole	4:39
4.	"Man Jhal Malhari"	Kunal Gaikwad, Vaibhav Shirole	Vaibhav Shirole	Vaibhav Shirole, Anandi Joshi	4:39
5.	"TDM Theme song"	Hanumant Chandgude	Sarang Kulkarni	Pratik Solse	3:17
Total length:					22:56
