= Bhaurao Karhade =

Indian film director

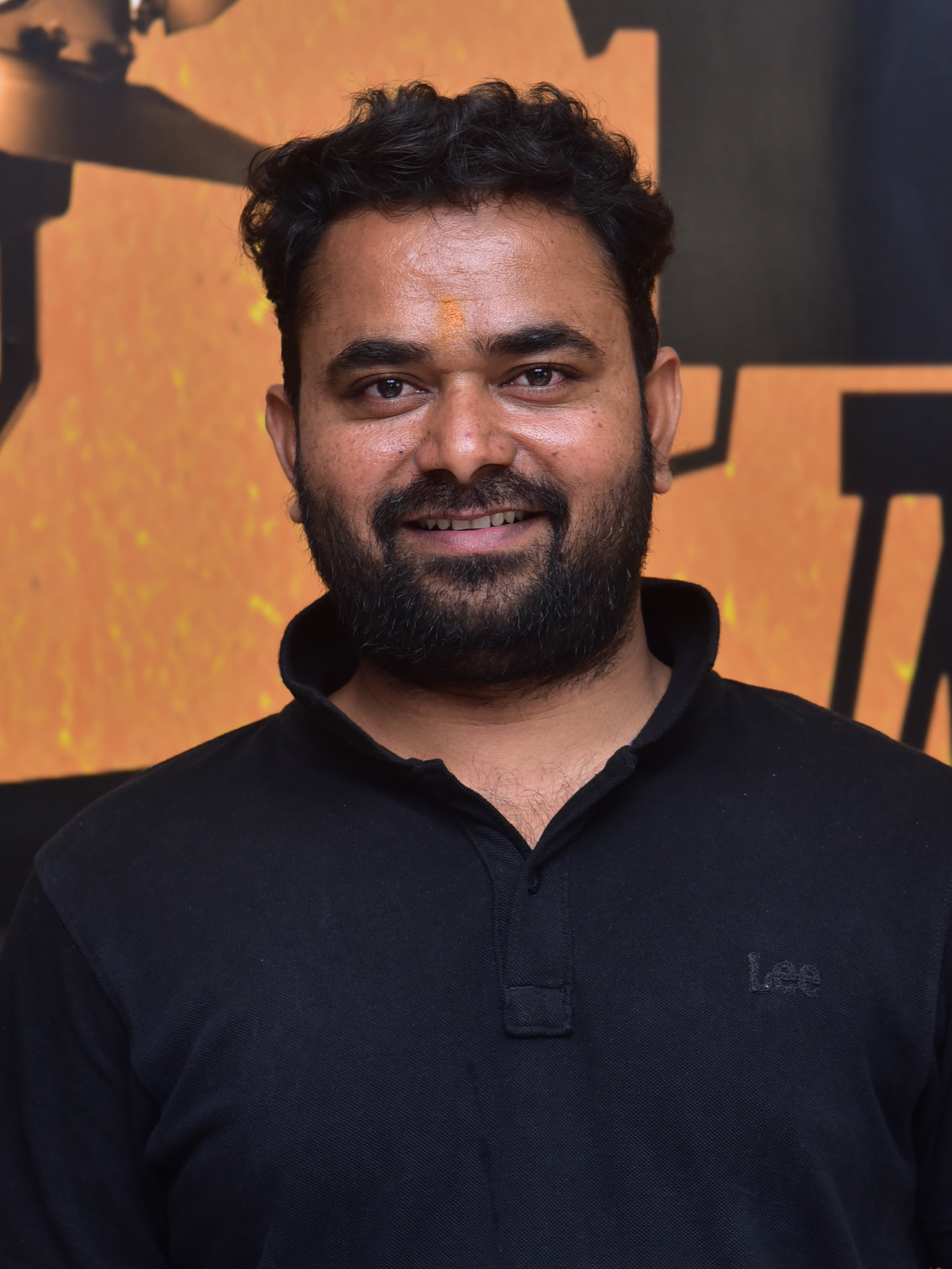
- Karhade in 2018
- Born: Bhaurao Nanasaheb Karhade; Ahmednagar, Maharashtra, India
- Occupations: Actor; Director; Producer; scriptwriter
- Spouse: Shubhangi Mane (m. 2024)

Bhaurao Karhade is an Indian film director, actor, producer, scriptwriter, filmmaker and he works in the Marathi Cinema, best known for his 2015 Marathi film Khwada for which he received National Film Award Special Jury Award and state award for Best Rural Director.

In 2018 Bhaurao returned with the action-drama, Baban was hit at the box office. The film collected around ₹15 crore in its 50-day run.

== Early life and background ==
Bhaurao karhade grew up in Ahmednagar district of Maharashtra. Karhade sold 5 acres of farm land to make the film Khwada.

== Filmography ==
Year	Film	Language	Director	Writer	Actor	Notes	Ref.
2015	Khwada	Marathi	Yes	No	No	National Film Award Special Jury Award, Best Audiography Award, state awards- Best Debut Film Production, Best Rural Film, Best Costume Design, Best Rural Director and Best Make-Up. Best Director award at the Pune International Film Festival, Prabhat Puraskar 2015 and the Marathi Filmfare awards.Maharashtra State Film Award for Best Rural Film	
2018	Baban	Marathi	Yes	Yes	Yes		
2020	Hyderabad-Custody	Marathi	Yes	Yes	No		
2023	TDM	Marathi	Yes	Yes	Yes		
TBA	Fakira †	Marathi	Yes	No	No		

== Awards and recognition ==
Festival / awards	Category	Result
National Film Award	Special Jury Award, the Best Audiography Award	Won
State Awards	Best Debut Film Production, Best Rural Film, Best Costume Design, Best Rural Director and Best Make-Up.	Won
Pune International Film Festival	Best Director	Won
