= Damodaran M. Vasudevan =

Indian doctor and biologist

Dr. Damodaran M. Vasudevan is the Director of Jubilee Centre for Medical Research at Jubilee Mission Medical College and Research Institute, Thrissur. He was the Dean of the college of Medicine at Amrita Vishwa Vidyapeetham and the Principal of the Amrita Hospital, Kochi. He currently serves as the Associate Dean of PG Programs and Research at Amrita School of Medicine.

After completing his Bachelor of Medicine and Surgery, he received his MD in Biochemistry from All India Institute of Medical Sciences in 1971. Subsequently, he became a Fellow of the Royal College of Pathologists in 1994. He is an authority in allergy and immunology and has also worked extensively on cancer too.

He has been the Principal of Government Medical College Thrissur. After his retirement from there, he joined the Kasturba Medical College, Mangalore and the Sikkim Manipal Institute of Medical Sciences as the Dean in 2000. From 2002 he has been in his present position.

Vasudevan, an elected fellow of the National Academy of Medical Sciences, received the prestigious Dr. B. C. Roy Award of the Medical Council of India from the hands of the then Hon'ble President of India in 1992 for excellence in the medical teaching profession. Dr Vasudevan will be fondly remembered by his students, as a committed teacher, guide and scholar in Biochemistry. He has authored the Textbook of Biochemistry for Medical Students, first edition was published in 1995, the eighth edition in 2016 and the ninth edition will be in the market by the middle of 2019. The book is now well known internationally. The Spanish and Slovak editions are already in print. The textbook is widely circulated in 23 countries of the world. Dr Vasudevan also authored textbooks for Dental students, paramedical students. He has guided 30 students for their PhD work. He has also published more than 230 papers in peer reviewed scientific journals.
