= Amrita School of Medicine =

Private medical schools in India

Amrita Schools of Medicine
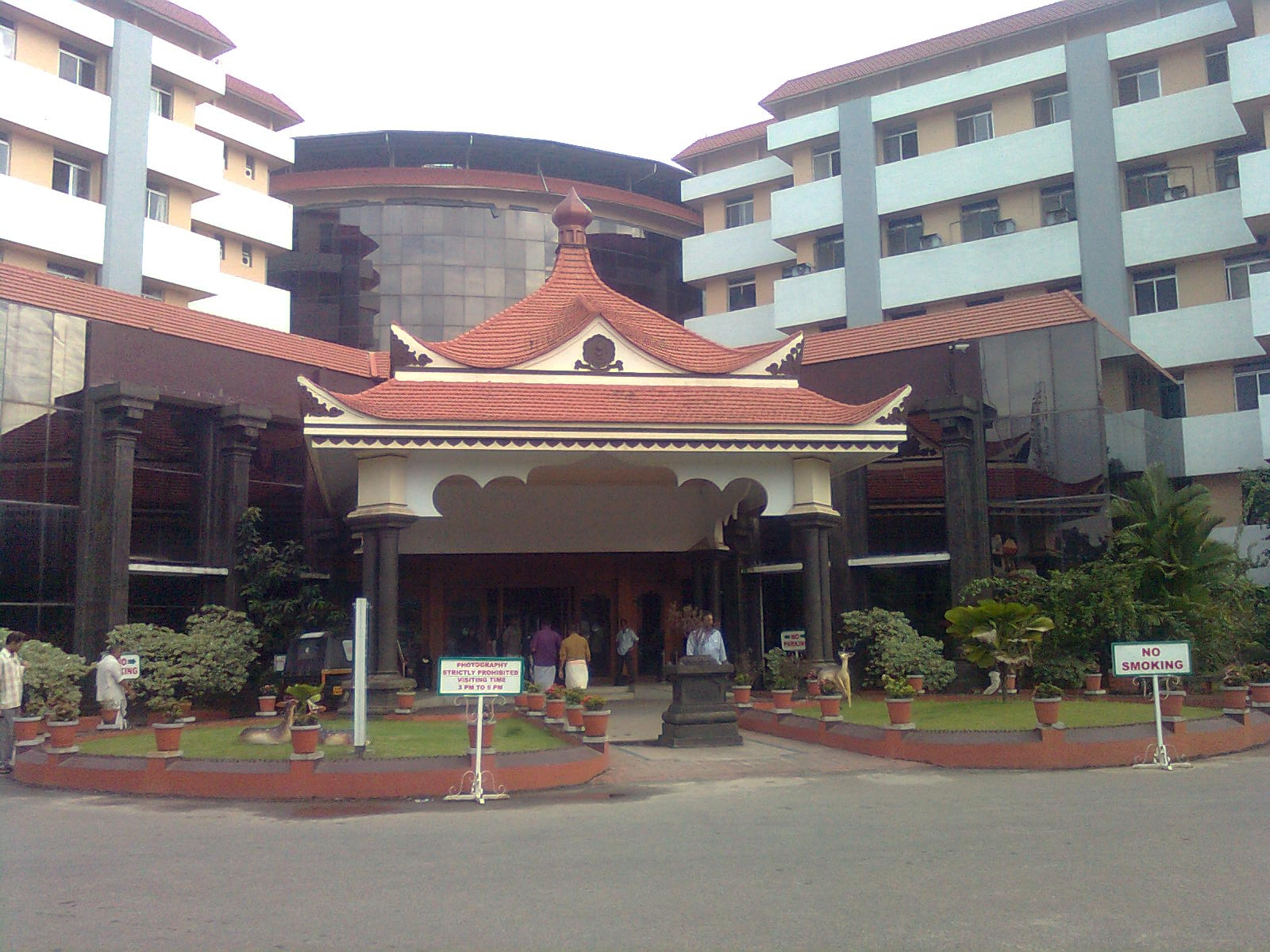
- Type: Private Medical schools
- Established: 2002
- Founder: Mata Amritanandamayi Devi
- Parent institution: Amrita Vishwa Vidyapeetham
- Affiliations: NMC, UGC
- Dean: Dr. Prem Kumar Nair
- Location: Kochi, India
- Campus: Urban
- Language: English
- Website: www.amrita.edu/school/medicine/

Amrita School of Medicine is a private medical school in Kochi, India, affiliated with Amrita Vishwa Vidyapeetham, a private deemed university. It is spread across two campuses in Kochi and Faridabad.

The Amrita School of Medicine is accredited by the National Medical Commission (NMC) of India and the World Health Organization (WHO).

== History ==
The first Amrita School of Medicine was founded in 2002 by Mata Amritanandamayi Devi, a spiritual leader and humanitarian in Kochi, Kerala. The school was followed by school in Faridabad in 2022. The schools were established with the goal of providing high-quality medical education to students from all backgrounds.

== Academics ==
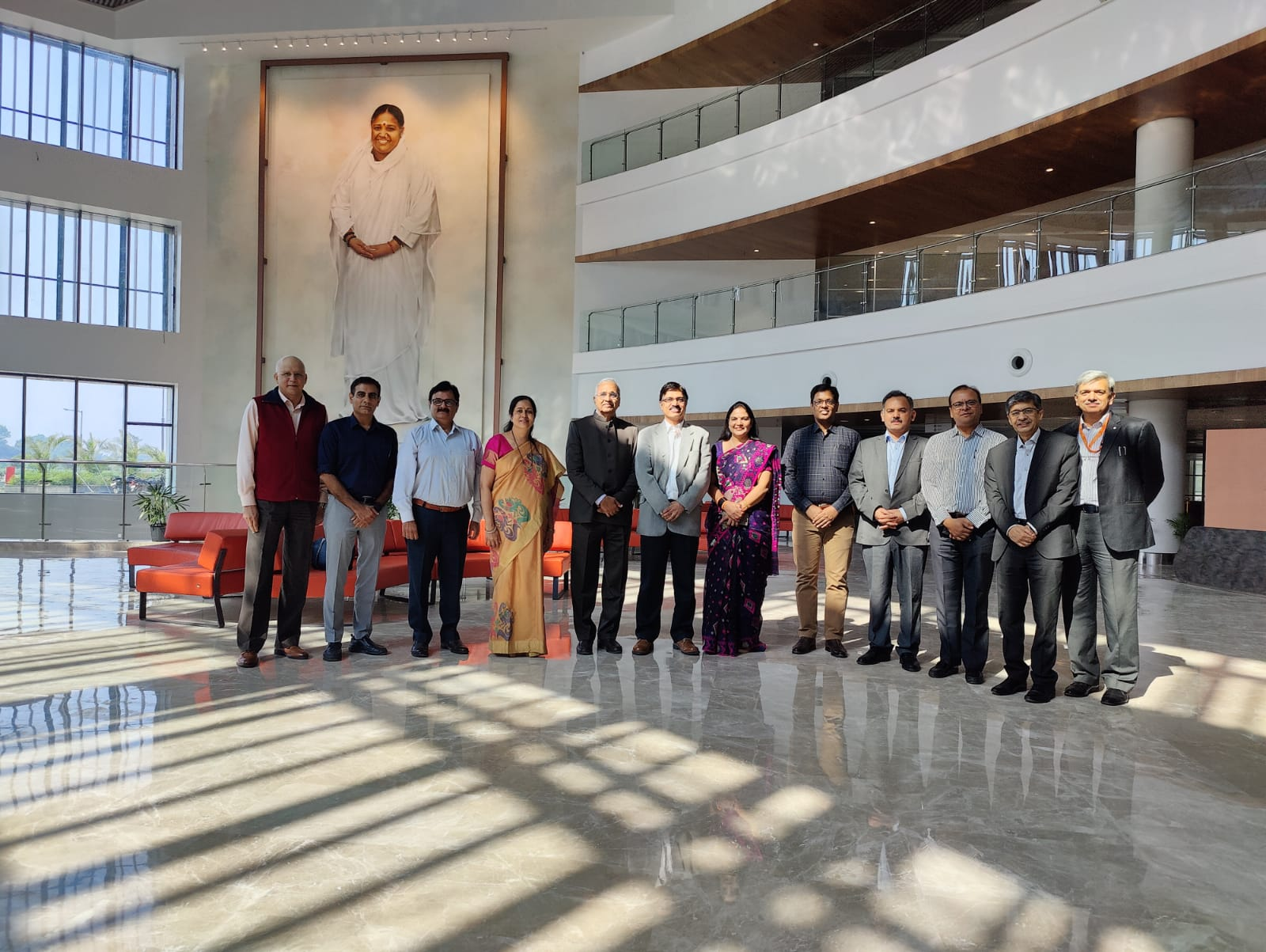
Amrita University - Faridabad Healthcare campus

The Amrita Schools of Medicine offer undergraduate and postgraduate medical programs. The undergraduate programs are five-year, MBBS programs that lead to the Doctor of Medicine degree. The postgraduate programs include MD, MS, and DM programs in a variety of specialties.

The medical schools along with nursing, pharmacy, nursing and allied health sciences are attached to Amrita Hospital, Kochi and Amrita Hospital, Faridabad.

== Research ==
The Amrita Schools of Medicine have a strong focus on research. The schools have a number of research centers and institutes, including the Amrita Center for Nanomedicine, the Amrita Center for Cancer Research, and the Amrita Center for Organ Transplantation.

The Amrita Schools of Medicine have published over 10,000 research papers in peer-reviewed journals. The schools have also received over $100 million in research funding.

== Rankings and accreditation ==
College rankings

General – India
- NIRF (Universities) (2023): 7

Medical – India
- NIRF (2023): 6

In June 2023, Amrita School of Medicine is ranked the 6th best medical school in India by the Ministry of Human Resource Development in their annual NIRF rankings. It was ranked 8th in 2022 rankings.

Amrita School of Medicine is the first institute in India to get accredited by National Accreditation Board for Hospitals & Healthcare Providers. Also all its labs are accredited by National Accreditation Board for Testing and Calibration Laboratories. It is also accredited by International Organization for Standardization.

== See also ==
- List of medical colleges in India
