= Rahul Bagga =

Indian actor

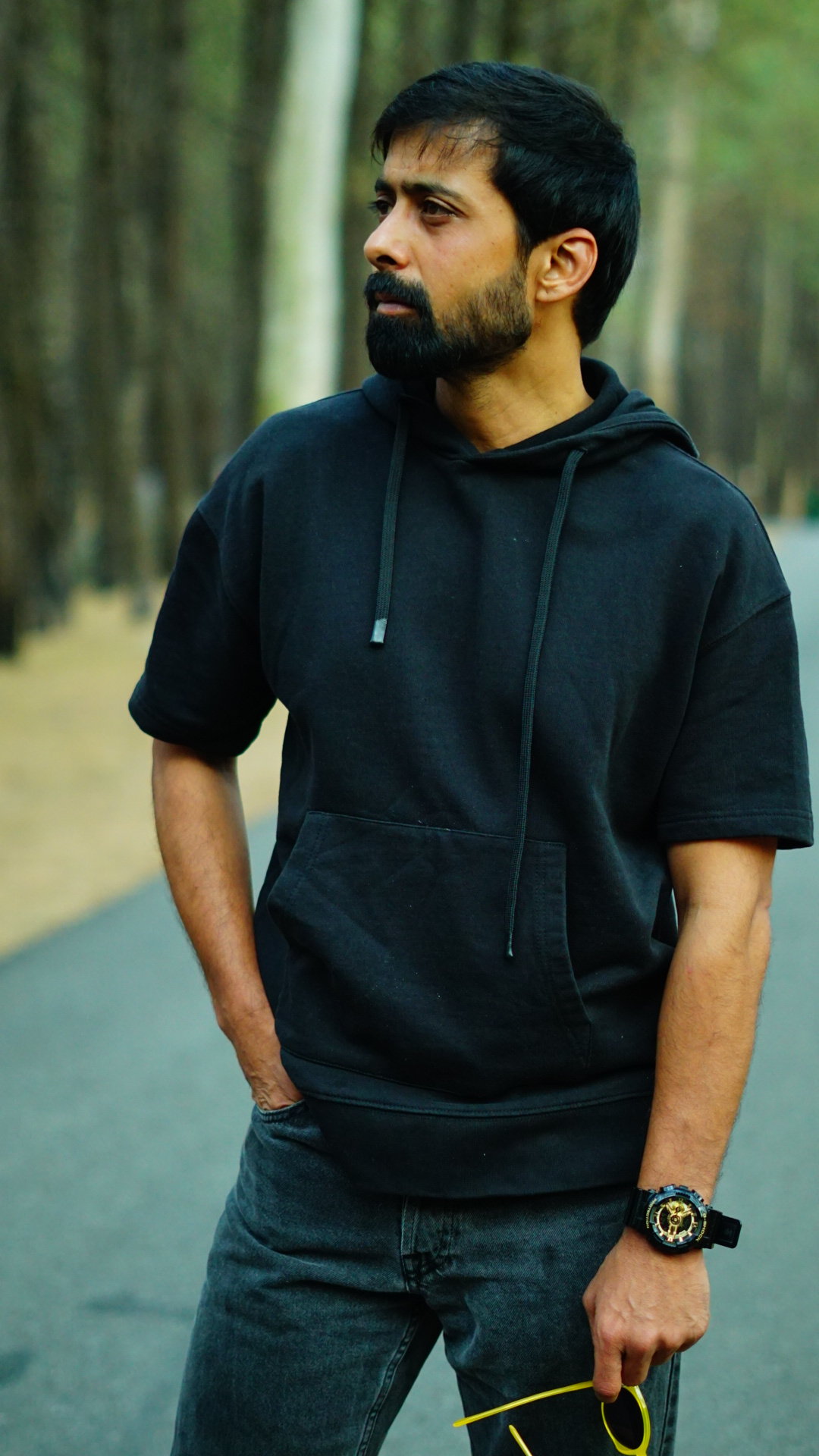
- Born: 30 December 1980 (age 45); Delhi, India
- Occupation: Actor

Rahul Bagga (born 30 December 1980) is an Indian actor who predominantly works in Hindi films. He made his mark as a supporting actor in Luv Shuv Tey Chicken Khurana. During the shooting of the film Sultan, he helped Salman Khan in teaching the Haryanvi language.

== Early life ==
Rahul Bagga was born on 30 December 1980 in Delhi, India.

== Career ==
Bagga appeared in Luv Shuv Tey Chicken Khurana, and in the Hindi film Mastram.

== Filmography ==
Year	Movie	Role	Reference
2012	Luv Shuv Tey Chicken Khurana	Jeet Khurana	
2014	Mastram	Rajaram	
2015	Miss Tanakpur Haazir Ho	Arjun Prasad	
2015	Tera Mera Tedha Medha	Rajan Jha	
2016	Mukkadarpur Ka Majnu	Dr. Rahul Anand	
2018	Shaadi Teri Bajayenge Hum Band	SHER SINGH	
2019	Facebook Wala Pyar		
2019	Kissebaaz	Harsh	
2019	Ludo	Chitra Gupta	
2022	Dhoop Chhaon	Surendar	
2025	Mandala murders	Sujoy Yadav	
