= Qissa-e Parsi: The Parsi Story =

Qissa-e Parsi: The Parsi Story is a 2014 documentary on the Parsi community in India. The directors of the film are Shilpi Gulati and Divya Cowasji. The film has been co-produced by Public Service Broadcasting Trust (PSBT) and the Public Diplomacy Division of the Ministry of External Affairs (India).

== Awards and screenings ==
- National Film Award for the Best Ethnographic/Anthropological Film 2014
- Official Selection at the Indian Panorama, International Film Festival of India 2014
