= Ottaal =

- Theatrical poster
- Directed by: Jayaraj
- Written by: Joshy Mangalath
- Based on: Vanka by Anton Chekhov
- Produced by: K. Mohan (Seven Arts Mohan); Vinod Vijayan
- Starring: Ashanth K. Sha; Kumarakom Vasudevan; Shine Tom Chacko; Sabitha Jayaraj; Thomas J. Kannampuzha
- Cinematography: M. J. Radhakrishnan
- Edited by: B. Ajithkumar
- Music by: Kavalam Narayana Panicker, Sreevalsan J. Menon (Background music)
- Production company: Director Cutz Film Company Ltd
- Distributed by: Qube India; Reelmonk
- Release date: 6 November 2015 (India)
- Running time: 81 minutes
- Country: India
- Languages: Malayalam; English

Ottaal (English: The Trap) is a 2015 Indian Malayalam film directed by Jayaraj, an adaptation of the Anton Chekhov 1886 short story "Vanka". The film stars Ashanth K Sha and Kumarakom Vasudevan, as well as Shine Tom Chacko, Sabitha Jayaraj and Thomas G. Kannampuzha.

It became the first movie in India to be released online on the same day as its theatrical release. The film made history, becoming the first ever Malayalam movie to sweep all the top awards in the 20-year history of the International Film Festival of Kerala. It was one of four Malayalam films selected to be a part of the Indian Panorama at the International Film Festival of India in Goa in November 2015.

== Plot ==
This film tells the story of a young boy (Ashanth K Sha) and his relationship with his grandfather (Kumarakom Vasudevan), his only living relative in the world. Actor Kumarakom Vasudevan is a fisherman in real life, whom Director Jayaraj found during his hunt for actors to play the role. Shine Tom Chacko's character, Mesthri, also has a pivotal role in the story. Ottaal is an adaptation of one of Anton Chekhov's timeless works, Vanka. A story of the 18th century, but one that has travelled the time and space to be retold in the present day at a small village in the South of India.

== Cast ==
- Master Ashanth K Sha as Kuttappai
- Kumarakaom Vasudevan as Vallyappachayi
- Shine Tom Chacko as Mesthri
- Thomas J Kannampuzha as Betty
- Sabitha Jayaraj as Moly
- Master Hafis Muhammed as Tinku
- Vavachan as Outha

== Soundtrack ==
The film has one song, "Aa Manathilirrunnu", composed by Padma Bhushan Kavalam Narayana Panicker. The background score composed by Sreevalsan J. Menon was praised by the jury when the film won the Crystal Bear at the Berlinale 2016.

== Release and reception ==
The film was released in theatres and online on 6 November 2015. The online platform was Reelmonk. It was the first Indian film to be released simultaneously in theaters and on the internet.

== Accolades ==
Award / Film Festival	Category	Recipient(s)	Result
National Film Awards	Best Screenplay Writer (Adapted)	Joshy Mangalath	Won
National Film Awards	Best Film on Environment Conservation/Preservation	Ottaal	Won
Kerala State Film Awards	Best Film	Jayaraj	Won
Mumbai Film Festival	Golden Gateway of India Award	Ottaal	Won
Mumbai Film Festival	Film for Social Impact Award	Ottaal	Won
International Film Festival of Kerala	Suvarna Chakoram (Best Film)	Ottaal	Won
International Film Festival of Kerala	Best Film - International Federation of Film Critics (FIPRESCI) jury	Ottaal	Won
International Film Festival of Kerala	Best Malayalam film - Network for the Promotion of Asian Cinema (NETPAC) jury	Ottaal	Won
International Film Festival of Kerala	Rajatha Chakoram - Audience Prize	Ottaal	Won
Berlin Film Festival	Crystal Bear	Ottaal	Won
