= Vinod Kapri =

Indian journalist and filmmaker

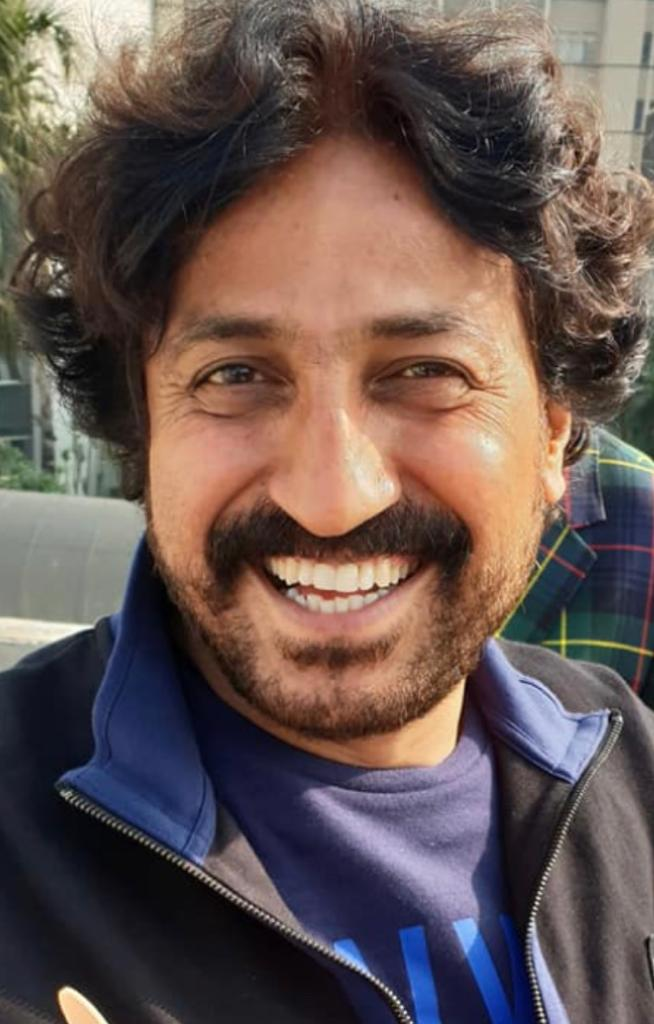
- Born: Secunderabad, Andhra Pradesh, India
- Occupations: Journalist, producer, film director, screenwriter
- Spouse: Sakshi Joshi

Vinod Kapri is an Indian filmmaker and journalist. His films include the documentary Can't Take This Shit Anymore (2014); feature films Miss Tanakpur Haazir Ho (2015) and Pihu (2018); the documentary film 1232 KMS (2021); and Pyre (2024).

== Early Life ==
Kapri was born in Secunderabad to D.S. Kapri, an Indian Army personnel, and Bhagirathi Devi and hails from a Kumaoni family with roots in Pithoragarh. His father's profession lead to frequent relocations and schooling across various central government and army schools.

== Career ==
In 2002, Kapri was made an output editor of Zee News. In 2004, he moved to Star News as an Executive Producer and rose to the post of Deputy Managing Editor. In 2007, he joined India TV as a Managing editor.

Kapri's debut film Miss Tanakpur Haazir Ho was released on 26 June 2015. Miss Tanakpur Haazir Ho is a socio-political satire inspired by true incident in Rajasthan. The film stars Annu Kapoor, Om Puri and Sanjay Mishra. The story is based in Tanakpur, a fictional village in Haryana, ruled by a power wielding 'pradhan' whose wife falls in love with a youth in the village. Miss Tanakpur Haazir Ho uncovers the duplicity of society that allows powerful men to misuse the establishments to settle their own score.

Pihu features its titular protagonist, a two-year-old girl who is left unsupervised at home after her mother commits suicide. The film is based on a true incident reported in a national daily in 2014, where a 4-year-old boy in Delhi who was left alone at home with his dead mother. The film is a social thriller by genre.

Pyre is a depiction of the Ghost villages of Uttarakhand. The plot revolves around an elderly Kumaoni couple being left alone in their village as other villagers gradually migrate to the 'plains' for work. It had its world premiere at the 28th Tallinn Black Nights Film Festival in the Official Competition section where it won the best film PÖFF Audience Award and won the Jury Special Mention Award in the Asian Cinema Competition section. Pyre was the opening film at the 16th Bengaluru International Film Festival.

== Filmography ==
- Can't Take This Shit Anymore (2014)
- Miss Tanakpur Haazir Ho (2015)
- Pihu (2018)
- 1232 KMS (2021)
- Pyre (2024)

== General references ==
- "Pyre Director Vinod Kapri: 'People Had Tears in Their Eyes'". MSN. Retrieved 6 March 2025. Link.
- "Pyre: A Heartfelt Tale of Love and Resilience". Dev Discourse. Retrieved 6 March 2025. Link.
