= Shyam Benegal filmography =

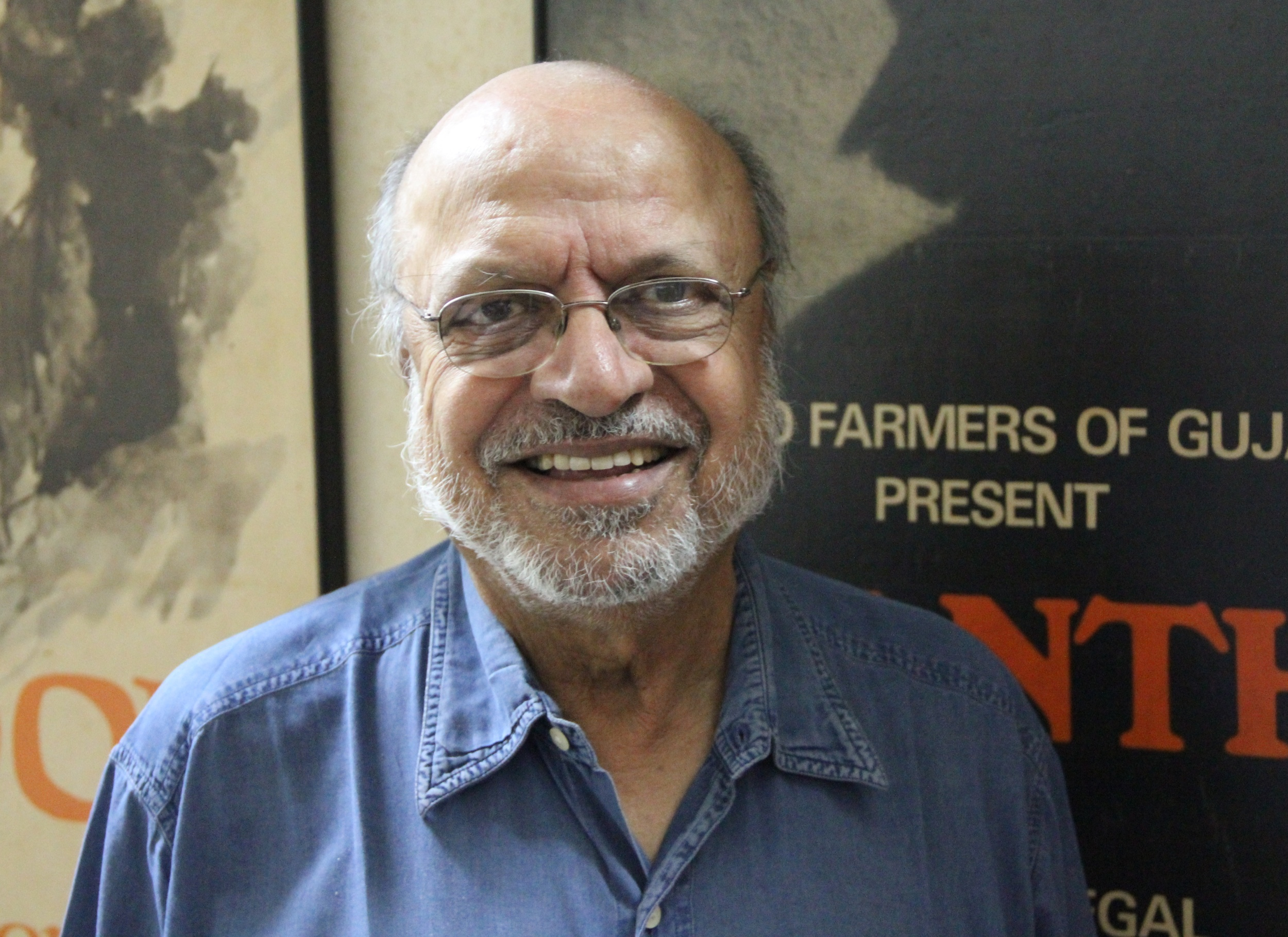
Photograph of Shyam Benegal

The filmography of Shyam Benegal is as follows:

== Feature films ==
Year	Title	Producer(s)	Other notes
1974	Ankur	Blaze Film Enterprises	National Film Award for Second Best Feature Film
1975	Charandas Chor	Children's Film Society of India	
1975	Nishant	Blaze Film Enterprises	Nominated for Palme d'Or, National Film Award for Best Feature Film in Hindi
1976	Manthan	Gujarat Milk Co-Op Marketing Federation Ltd.	Indian submission for the Academy Award for Best Foreign Language Film, National Film Award for Best Feature Film in Hindi
1977	Bhumika	Blaze Film Enterprises	Filmfare Best Movie Award
1978	Kondura (Anugraham)	Raviraj International	Featured in the Indian Panorama at the 1979 Berlin International Film Festival
1979	Junoon	Film Valas	1980 Filmfare Best Movie Award, National Film Award for Best Feature Film in Hindi
1981	Kalyug	Film Valas	1982 Filmfare Best Movie Award
1982	Arohan	Blaze Film Enterprises	National Film Award for Best Feature Film in Hindi
1983	Mandi	Blaze Film Enterprises	Invited to the 1983 London Film Festival
1985	Trikaal	Blaze Film Enterprises	National Film Award for Best Direction
1987	Susman	Association of Corporations and Apex Societies of Handloom, Sahyadri Films	Invited to the 1987 London Film Festival
1991	Antarnaad	Suhetu Films	
1993	Suraj Ka Satvan Ghoda	National Film Development Corporation	National Film Award for Best Feature Film in Hindi
1994	Mammo	National Film Development Corporation	National Film Award for Best Feature Film in Hindi
1996	Sardari Begum	PLUS Films	National Film Award for Best Film in Urdu
1996	The Making of the Mahatma	National Film Development Corporation, South African Broadcasting Corporation	National Film Award for Best Feature Film in English
1999	Samar	National Film Development Corporation	National Film Award for Best Feature Film
2000	Hari-Bhari	National Film Development Corporation, Ministry of Health and Family Welfare	National Film Award for Best Film on Family Welfare
2001	Zubeidaa	F.K.R. Productions, Sahyadri Films	National Film Award for Best Feature Film in Hindi
2005	Netaji Subhas Chandra Bose: The Forgotten Hero	Sahara India Motion Pictures, Sahyadri Films	Nargis Dutt Award for Best Feature Film on National Integration
2008	Welcome to Sajjanpur	UTV Spot Boy Motion Pictures	
2009	Well Done Abba	Raj Pius, Mahesh Ramanathan	National Film Award for Best Film on Other Social Issues
2023	Mujib: The Making of a Nation	Bangladesh Film Development Corporation (BFDC), National Film Development Corporation of India (NFDC)	

== Documentaries ==
Year	Title	Other notes
1967	Close to Nature	
1967	A Child of the Streets	
1968	Sinhasta, or The Path to Immortality	
1968	Indian Youth: An Exploration	
1969	Horoscope for a Child	
1970	Why Export?	
1970	Quest for a Nation	
1971	Tala and Rhythm	
1971	Steel: A Whole New Way of Life	
1971	The Pulsating Giant	
1972	The Shruti and Graces of Indian Music	
1972	Raga and Melody	
1972	The Raag Imam Kalyan	
1972	Power to the People	
1972	Notes on the Green Revolution	
1972	Foundations of Progress	
1973	Suhani Sadak	
1974	You Can Prevent Burns	
1974	Violence: What Price? Who Pays? No. 5	
1974	The Quiet Revolution	
1974	Learning Modules for Rural Children	
1974	Bal Sansar	
1975	The Quiet Revolution, Part 2	
1976	Tomorrow Begins Today: Industrial Research	
1976	Epilepsy	
1977	New Horizons in Steel	
1979	Reaching Out to People	
1979	Pashu Palan	
1982	Satyajit Ray, Filmmaker	National Film Award for Best Biographical Film
1982	Jawaharlal Nehru	
1982	Growth for a Golden Future	
1983	Tata Steel: Seventy Five Years of the Indian Steel Industry	
1983	Sangathan	
1983	Animal Reproduction and Artificial Insemination in Bovines	
1985	Vardan	
1985	Nehru	National Film Award for Best Historical Reconstruction
1985	Festival of India	
1990	A Quilt of Many Cultures: South India	
1990	Nature Symphony	
1990	Abode of Kings: Rajasthan	
2007	Lost Childhood	see:

== Short films ==
Year	Title	Other notes
1962	Gher Betha Ganga	
1969	Poovanam	
1969	Flower Garden	
1975	Hero	

== Television ==
Year	Title	Other notes
1986	Yatra	Commissioned by Indian Railways on trans-India Himsagar Express
1986	Katha Sagar	
1988	Bharat Ek Khoj	Based on Jawaharlal Nehru's Discovery of India
1995	Amaravati ki Kathayein	Based on Amaravathi Kathalu in Telugu by Sankaramanchi Sathyam
1997	Sankranti	10-episode serial, dwelling on the legislations and decisions of the Government over 50 years for the Golden Jubilee celebrations of India's Independence
2014	Samvidhaan	a 10-part mini-series revolving around the making of Indian Constitution on Rajya Sabha TV
