= Lalit Tiwari =

Indian film and television actor

- Born: Nainital, Uttarakhand, India
- Education: National School of Drama
- Occupation: Actor
- Years active: 1987–present

Lalit Mohan Tiwari is an Indian actor known for his work in Hindi films and television. He is best known for his roles in the epic Mahabharat (1988-1990), Om-Dar-B-Dar (1988), Chandni (1989), Lamhe (1991), Dilwale Dulhania Le Jayenge (1995), Welcome to Sajjanpur (2008), and Well Done Abba (2009).

== Career ==
An alumnus of the National School of Drama he debuted in films with Sudhir Mishra's Yeh Woh Manzil To Nahin (1987). He has acted in numerous parallel cinema projects with director Shyam Benegal, such as Suraj Ka Satvan Ghoda, Mammo, Hari-Bhari, Netaji Subhas Chandra Bose: The Forgotten Hero, Welcome to Sajjanpur and Well Done Abba! and mainstream projects such as Chandni (1989), Lamhe (1991) and Dilwale Dulhania Le Jayenge (1995).

== Filmography ==
=== Film ===
Year	Title	Role	Notes
1987	Yeh Woh Manzil To Nahin	Srikant	
1988	Om-Dar-Ba-Dar	Jagdish	
1989	Chandni		
1989	Bhrashtachar	Keshav Kumar	
1989	Sach		
1991	Pratigyabadh	Baburam Yadav	
1991	Akayla	Charan	
1991	Lamhe	Sudeshwar Narayan Tiwari	
1992	Raju Ban Gaya Gentleman	Rafique	
1992	Bewaffa Se Waffa	Altaf Ahmed	
1993	Roop Ki Rani Choron Ka Raja		
1993	Suraj Ka Satvan Ghoda	Chaman Thakur	
1993	Pehchaan		
1994	Tarpan	Jeetu Thakur	
1994	Sardar	Maulana Azad	
1994	Elaan	Doctor Deepak	
1994	Laadla	Lawyer	
1994	Yeh Dillagi	Mr. Gokhale	
1994	Eena Meena Deeka	Harshad	
1994	Mammo	Riyaz's father	
1994	Chaand Kaa Tukdaa	Raja Saheb	
1995	Dilwale Dulhania Le Jayenge	Simran's uncle	
1996	Krishna	Sunil's Instructor	
1996	Shastra	Girdhari	
1997	Udaan	Mental patient	
1999	Jai Hind	Karan	
2000	Bawandar	Tej Karan	
2000	Hari-Bhari	Khaleej	
2001	Yeh Raaste Hain Pyaar Ke	Ashok Sharma	
2002	The Legend of Bhagat Singh	Prof. Vidyalankar	
2003	Dabdaba	K.K	
2004	Netaji Subhas Chandra Bose: The Forgotten Hero	Checkpost Policeman	
2005	Mangal Pandey: The Rising	Davar Ali	
2006	Tathastu	Politician	
2006	Jai Santoshi Maa	Pratap	
2006	Chabiwali Pocket Watch	Babba	
2007	Anwar	Pappu	
2008	Welcome to Sajjanpur	Subedar Singh	
2009	Bad Luck Govind	Potent Pandey	
2009	Well Done Abba!	Meherban Ali - Arif's father	
2012	Ata Pata Lapatta	Swamiji	
2013	Bhopal: A Prayer for Rain	Muslim Money Lender	
2014	Das Capital	Mantri	
2015	Hawaizaada	Charu Shastri	
2022	Samrat Prithviraj	Anangpal Tomar	
2024	Chote Nawab		

=== Television ===
Year	Title	Role	Notes
1986	Bahadur Shah Zafar	Ahmed Baig	
1988–1990	Mahabharat	Sanjay	
1988	Bharat Ek Khoj	Babur	
1993	Bible Ki Kahaniya	Narrator	
1996–1997	Itihaas	Srivastav	
1998–1999	Lakeerein		
2001–2002	Jai Mahabharat	Maharaj Dhritarashtra	
2003	1857 Kranti	Bajirao II	
	Paap Punya Ka Lekha Jokha	Brahmadev	
2007	Apne Dil Se Puchho	Mohan's Father Vitthal	
2008	Chhoona Hai Aasmaan	Hyder Sheikh	
2014	Samvidhaan	Shibban Lal Saxena	
