= Rajeshwari Sachdev =

Indian actress and singer (born 1975)

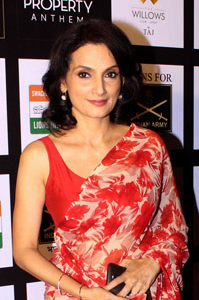
- Sachdev in 2018
- Born: Raj Kaur Sachdev; 14 April 1974 (age 52); Mumbai, Maharashtra, India
- Education: Guru Nanak Khalsa College of Arts, Science & Commerce
- Occupations: Actress; Singer; Model; Television Presenter; VJ
- Years active: 1991 – present
- Works: Discography; Filmography
- Spouse: Varun Badola (m. 2004)
- Children: 1
- Relatives: Alka Kaushal (sister-in-law)
- Awards: National Film Award for Best Supporting Actress: Sardari Begum (1997)
- Musical career
- Genres: Indian pop, Folk, Sufi
- Instruments: Vocals
- Labels: Magnasound; Times Music

Rajeshwari Sachdev (born 14 April 1974) is an Indian actress and singer known for her role in Shyam Benegal's film Sardari Begum (1996), for which she won the 1997 National Film Award for Best Supporting Actress.

Sachdev co-hosted the Zee TV musical show, Antakshari from 1994 to 2001 with Annu Kapoor. She also hosted other television shows such as K for Kishore and Femina Miss India 2002, which marked only her television non-music reality show to date. In 2005, she along with her husband Varun Badola, took part a reality TV dance competition show, Nach Baliye. She also worked in Crime TV series Rihhaee where she played a role of an activist.

== Early life ==
Rajeshwari was born on 14 April 1974, in Mumbai to a Punjabi father and a Tamil mother

After completing her graduation from Guru Nanak Khalsa College (King's Circle) in Mumbai. Sachdev started her career on stage doing plays with Indian People's Theatre Association.

== Career ==
Sachdev made her film debut with the Marathi film Aayatya Gharat Gharoba (1991), directed by Sachin.

Her second film was Shyam Benegal's Suraj Ka Satvan Ghoda (1992). She then became a regular in his films, and was cast in Mammo (1994), Sardari Begum (1996), Samar (1999), Hari-Bhari (2000), Netaji Subhas Chandra Bose: The Forgotten Hero (2005) and Welcome to Sajjanpur (2008). She also appeared in the Hollywood film Little Buddha (1993) and later in Tales of The Kama Sutra: The Perfumed Garden (1998). She also worked in the show Samvidhaan, directed by Shyam Benegal.

She sang the pop song "Hulle Hullare" in her debut album of the same name released in 1999.

Sachdev was signed as the lead in TV series Rihhaee replacing actress Divya Dutta who quit the show after shooting for one episode. She is currently playing the role of Mamta Noon in Sony TV's romantic drama series Dil Hi Toh Hai and Kusum Kothari in StarPlus's drama series Shaadi Mubarak.

== Personal life ==
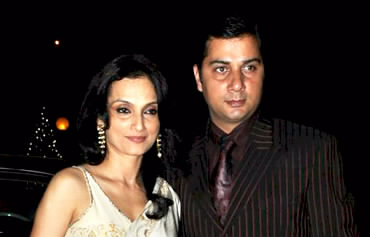
Rajeshwari Sachdev with husband Varun Badola in 2012

Sachdev married Varun Badola on 24 November 2004. They met on the sets of the television show Antakshari and were engaged the same year. They have a son, born on 10 May 2010. Badola has a farm house in his native Uttarakhand at a place called Bhabher in Kotdwar.

== Filmography ==
=== Films ===
Year	Title	Role	Notes
2022	Nazar Andaz	Mohini	
2019	Firebrand	Divya Patel Pradhan	Marathi film
2015	Welcome Zindagi	Seema Rajwade	Marathi film
2015	Runh: The Debt		Marathi film
2014	Bazaar E Husn	Didi	
2013	Issaq	Paro	
2013	Samhita	Hemangini/ Bhairavi	Marathi film
2012	Arjun: The Warrior Prince	Draupadi	Voice role
2010	Malik Ek	Saraswati	
2009	7 Days in Slow Motion	Mrs. Suri	English film
2008	Welcome to Sajjanpur	Shobharani	
2004	Netaji Subhas Chandra Bose: The Forgotten Hero	Capt. Lakshmi Sahgal	
2004	Mitter Pyare Nu Haal Mureedan Da Kehna	Preet	Punjabi film
2003	The Perfect Husband		
2001	Meri Pyaari Bahania Banegi Dulhania	Mehndi	
2001	Rahul	Sheela	
2000	Samar	Uma	
2000	Tales of The Kama Sutra : The Perfumed Garden	Lochani/ Loni	
2000	Hari-Bhari	Salma	
1998	Qila	Lajo	
1997	Tunnu Ki Tina	Tina	
1996	English Babu Desi Mem	Katariya	
1996	Sardari Begum	Sakina	Urdu film National Film Award for Best Supporting Actress
1995	Param Vir Chakra	Radha	
1994	Mammo	Riyaz's mother	
1994	Triyacharitra	Bimli	
1993	Little Buddha	Yasodhara	English film
1993	Pyar Pyar		
1993	Suraj Ka Satvan Ghoda	Jamuna	
1991	Aayatya Gharat Gharoba	Kaanan	Marathi film
1981	Ek Hi Bhool	Singer	Sang 1 song

=== Television shows ===
Year	Title	Role	Notes
1994-2001	Antakshari	Co-Host	Her debut television show
1997	Margarita	Margarita	Lead role
1997–1998	Om Namah Shivay	Rati	
2002	Femina Miss India	Co-Host	Her only Television non-music reality show to date
2004	Rihaee	Madhavi	
2005	Phir Se		Television film
2005	Nach Baliye	Contestant	
2006–2007	Ji Bhenji		
2007–2008	K for Kishore	Host	
2014–2015	Laut Aao Trisha	Lavanya Swaika Garewal	
2014	Samvidhaan	Rajkumari Amrit Kaur	
2015–2016	Balika Vadhu	Mangla Devi	
2017	Peshwa Bajirao	Radhabai	
2018–2019	Dil Hi Toh Hai	Mamta Noon	
2020–2021	Shaadi Mubarak	Kusum Kothari	
2024	Yeh Kaali Kaali Ankhein	Purva Awasthi Mom	
2025	Maharani Season 4	Gayatri	

== Discography ==
=== Albums ===
Year	Title	Song	Music Composer(s)	Lyricist	Co-singer	Notes
1998	Sach Ka Saath	"Ye Desh Hamaara"	Trilok Singh Loomba			Background vocal only (Uncredited)
1998	Sach Ka Saath	"Anushasaan"	Trilok Singh Loomba			Background vocal only (Uncredited)
1999	Hulle Hullare	"Hulle Hullare"	Amar Haldipur		Solo	Debut album
1999	Hulle Hullare	"Dil Mera Dhadka"	Amar Haldipur		Solo	Debut album
1999	Hulle Hullare	"Aajave Aaja"	Amar Haldipur		Solo	Debut album
1999	Hulle Hullare	"Haule Haule Babuji"	Amar Haldipur		Solo	Debut album
1999	Hulle Hullare	"Jab Dil Mein"	Amar Haldipur		Solo	Debut album
1999	Hulle Hullare	"Gori Gori"	Amar Haldipur		Solo	Debut album
1999	Hulle Hullare	"Dono Ke Dil"	Amar Haldipur		Solo	Debut album
1999	Hulle Hullare	"Jana Gaya Sar Mohilya"	Amar Haldipur		Solo	Debut album
2000	Mukhda Piya Ka	"Mukhda Piya Ka"	Kuldip Singh and Hardeep Singh	Naqesh Lyallpuri	Solo	Second album
2000	Mukhda Piya Ka	"Hadda-E-O"	Kuldip Singh and Hardeep Singh	Naqesh Lyallpuri	Solo	Second album
2000	Mukhda Piya Ka	"Teri Jalwa"	Kuldip Singh and Hardeep Singh	Naqesh Lyallpuri	Solo	Second album
2000	Mukhda Piya Ka	"Koi Vadaa"	Kuldip Singh and Hardeep Singh	Naqesh Lyallpuri	Solo	Second album
2000	Mukhda Piya Ka	"Aave Sajna"	Kuldip Singh and Hardeep Singh	Naqesh Lyallpuri	Solo	Second album
2000	Mukhda Piya Ka	"Kya Kehna"	Kuldip Singh and Hardeep Singh	Naqesh Lyallpuri	Solo	Second album
2000	Mukhda Piya Ka	"Tere Naino Se"	Kuldip Singh and Hardeep Singh	Naqesh Lyallpuri	Solo	Second album
2000	Mukhda Piya Ka	"Mahi Mahi"	Kuldip Singh and Hardeep Singh	Naqesh Lyallpuri	Solo	Second album
2004	Ummang	"Lathhe Di Chaddar"	Jayanta Pathak		Solo	
2004	Ummang	"Palla Sipaiyaa"	Jayanta Pathak		Solo	
2004	Ummang	"Madhaaniyan"	Jayanta Pathak		Solo	
2004	Ummang	"Maavan Te Tiyaan"	Jayanta Pathak		Solo	
2004	Ummang	"Daachi Valeya"	Jayanta Pathak		Solo	
2004	Ummang	"Meri Chunni Nu"	Jayanta Pathak		Solo	
2004	Ummang	"Sui Ve Sui"	Jayanta Pathak		Solo	
2004	Ummang	"In Ankhiyaan Vich Tu"	Jayanta Pathak		Solo	
2004	Ummang	"Jab Aave Rangili Phag"	Jayanta Pathak		Solo	
2004	Ummang	"Phagun Ko Mahino"	Jayanta Pathak		Solo	
