= Rajit Kapur =

Indian actor (b. 1963)

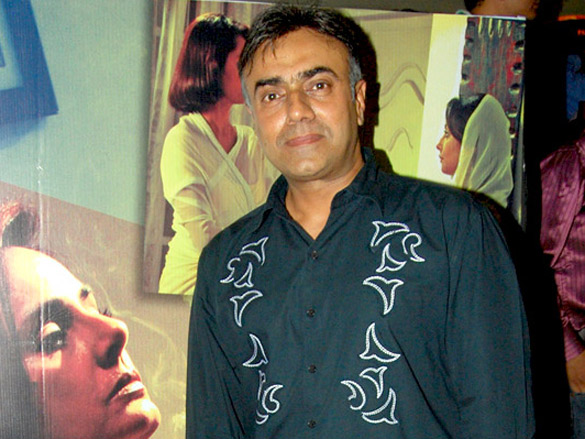
- Kapur in 2011
- Born: 22 May 1963 (age 63); Amritsar, Punjab, India
- Education: Sydenham College (BCom)
- Occupations: Actor, director, writer, producer
- Known for: Byomkesh Bakshi, The Making of the Mahatma, Agnisakshi, Suraj Ka Satvan Ghoda

Rajit Kapur (born 27 August 1963) is an Indian film and theatre actor and director. He is known for his portrayal of Mahatma Gandhi in the 1996 film, The Making of the Mahatma for which he won the National Film Award for Best Actor. Other notable roles are as the protagonist Unni in the Malayalam film Agnisakshi, and the fictional detective Byomkesh Bakshi in the eponymous television series, directed by Basu Chatterjee and broadcast on Doordarshan. His debut film was Suraj Ka Satvan Ghoda (1992), directed by Shyam Benegal.

== Life ==
Rajit Kapur was born in Amritsar, India on 27 August 1963 in a Punjabi family. He received his Bachelor of Commerce degree from Sydenham College. Kapur is unmarried and has no children.

== Career ==
When Rajit Kapur was 12 years old, he acted in a children's TV drama on Doordarshan. After 10 years, while working as a stage manager, he acted in the TV series Ghar Jamai, which was his first acting role in a TV series. The 1992 film titled Suraj Ka Satvan Ghoda directed by Shyam Benegal was his debut film. Kapur played the role of the famous Bengali detective Byomkesh Bakshi in the eponymously named TV series, Byomkesh Bakshi (1993). Byomkesh Bakshi is a fictitious character created by the popular Bengali writer Sharadindu Bandyopadhyay. Basu Chatterjee directed a TV show based on the stories of Bandyopadhyay, and Rajit Kapur played the lead role. The show was very popular and Rajit Kapur achieved his first media recognition through this show. Kapur is also a very prominent theatre actor and director in India. He acted in Malayalam film Agnisakshi in 1999 which won numerous acclodes including National Film Award for Best Feature Film in Malayalam, and he was awarded Kerala State Film Award for Best Actor.

He has also acted in several commercially successful movies like Kick, Uri: The Surgical Strike and Raazi. His latest work is The Threshold. Kapur starred in Deepti Naval's film titled Do Paise Ki Dhoop, Chaar Aane Ki Baarish which was supposed to release in 2012 in India but was released on Netflix in 2019. In 2022, Kapur acted in his first Punjabi language film Birha – The Journey Back Home. The short won the ‘Best film award’ at Amsterdam International Film Festival, Hollywood Shorts FEST, Los Angeles Film Awards (LAFA), New York Indian Film Festival, Calcutta International Cult Film Festival and at the Gangtok International Film Festival. 2023 saw the release of Mission Majnu and Mujib: The Making of a Nation and in both films he played the role of Pakistan's Prime Minister Zulfikar Ali Bhutto.

== Filmography ==
Year	Title	Role	Notes
1989	Jazeere	Raul	
1992	Suraj Ka Satvan Ghoda	Manik Mulla	
1994	Mammo	Riyaz (Adult)	First film in "Shyam Benegal's Muslim Trilogy"
1994	Charachar	Lakhinder	
1995	Limited Manuski	Sadanand Borse	Marathi film
1996	The Making of the Mahatma	Mohandas Karamchand Gandhi	Won National Film Award for Best Actor
1996	Sardari Begum	Sadiq Moosvi	Second film in "Shyam Benegal's Muslim Trilogy"
1998	Train to Pakistan	Iqbal	
1998	Ghulam	Jai	
1999	Samar		
1999	Agnisakshi	Unni	Malayalam film, Kerala State Film Award for Best Actor
2000	Hari-Bhari	Khurshid	
2001	Dattak	Sunil	
2001	Censor		
2001	Zubeidaa	Riyaz Masud	Third film in "Shyam Benegal's Muslim Trilogy"
2002	Octave	Dr. Gujaral	
2002	Nishad	Dr. Gopi Gujaral	
2002	Zindagi Khoobsoorat Hai	Prakash	
2002	Abaidha		Bengali film
2003	Ek Alag Mausam	George	
2004	Rok Sako To Rok Lo	Sweety's husband	
2005	Netaji Subhas Chandra Bose: The Forgotten Hero	Abid Hasan	
2005	Maine Gandhi Ko Nahin Mara	Ronu Chaudhary	
2006	Deadline: Sirf 24 Ghante	Dr. Viren Goenka	
2007	Dahek - A Restless Mind	Ajay Mathur	
2008	Welcome to Sajjanpur	Collector	
2009	Do Paise Ki Dhoop, Chaar Aane Ki Baarish	Debu	Premiered at 2009 Cannes Film Festival Direct-to-video
2009	Gulmohar	Deven	
2009	Yeh Mera India	Arun Talreja	
2009	Blue Oranges	Nilesh	
2009	Morning Walk	Indra	
2009	Marega Salaa	Rahul Awasthi	
2010	Guzaarish	Public Prosecutor, Vipin Patel	
2010	Well Done Abba	Inspector Rishab Reddy	
2011	Shaitan	Amy's Father	
2011	Dam 999	Shankaran	UAE–Indian co-production film
2011	Monica	Raj Jaitley	
2013	Singh Saab the Great	Iqbal	
2013	Mishawr Rawhoshyo	Al Mamun	Bengali film
2014	Dishkiyaoon	Viki's Dad	
2014	Kick	Dr. Jayant Verma	
2015	Uvaa	Principal	
2015	Roy	Detective Wadia	
2016	Anna: Kisan Baburao Hazare		
2016	Baar Baar Dekho	Panditji	Special appearance
2016	Ki & Ka	Mr. Kumar Bansal	
2017	A Gentleman	Kavya's father	
2017	The Wishing Tree	Fatima's Father	
2017	Begum Jaan	Ilias Khan	
2018	Raazi	Hidayat Khan	
2018	Phir Se...	Krish	
2018	Mehram	Ikhlaque Siddiqui	Short film released on ZEE5
2019	Bypass Road	Pratap	
2019	22 Yards		
2019	Uri: The Surgical Strike	Prime Minister of India	
2019	Do Paise Ki Dhoop, Chaar Aane Ki Baarish	Debu	
2020	Fitrat		Short film
2021	Nail Polish	Judge Kishore Bhushan	ZEE5 original film
2022	Attack: Part 1	Home Minister Digvijay Singh	
2022	Life's Good		
2022	Rocketry: The Nambi Effect	Vikram Sarabhai	
2022	Code Name: Tiranga	Kabir Ali	
2022	Birha – The Journey Back Home		Punjabi short film released in JioCinema
2023	Mission Majnu	Zulfikar Ali Bhutto	
2023	Mujib: The Making of a Nation	Zulfikar Ali Bhutto	
2024	Chhatrapati Sambhaji	Aurangzeb	
2024	Paani		Marathi film
2025	Kaisi Ye Paheli	Detective Bondo	

=== Plays ===
- Love Letters
- Class of '84
- Larins Sahib
- Are There Tigers in the Congo?
- Mr. Behram
- Six Degrees of Separation
- Pune Highway
- Me Kash and Cruise
- Flowers
- A Walk In The Woods
- One on One Part 2
- The Siddhus of Upper Juhu
- Mahua (as director)

=== Television series ===
Year(s)	Title	Credited as			Notes
Year(s)	Title	Actor	Director	Role	Notes
1986	Ghar Jamai	Yes			
1991	Kshitij Ye Nahi	Yes			
1993	Byomkesh Bakshi	Yes		Byomkesh Bakshi	Season 1
1995-96	Yugantar	Yes			
1997-98	Junoon	Yes			
1997	Byomkesh Bakshi	Yes		Byomkesh Bakshi	Season 2
1999	Star Bestsellers	Yes	Yes		Episode entitled "Tripti". Also, writer and producer.
1999	Star Bestsellers	Yes			Episode 12 – "Prayas"
1999	Star Bestsellers	Yes	Yes		Episode 8 – "Shuruaat". Also, producer.
2001	Rishtey – The Love Stories	Yes		Shastri	Episode 158 – "Poorab Aur Pashchim"
2014	Samvidhaan	Yes		Alladi Krishnaswamy Iyer	
2015	Bang Baaja Baaraat	Yes			Web series
2019	Bard of Blood	Yes		Sadiq Shaikh	Netflix series
2019	TVF Tripling	Yes		Satyanweshi	Season 2 of the web series
2022	Rocket Boys	Yes		Jawaharlal Nehru	SonyLIV
2024-present	Sardar: The Game Changer	Yes		Vallabhbhai Patel	DD National
2025	Pharma	Yes		Dr. Rajeev Rao	JioHotstar Malayalam series

== Awards ==
- 1996: National Film Award for Best Actor - The Making of the Mahatma
- 1998: Kerala State Film Award for Best Actor - Agnisakshi
- 2010: Imagine India Film Festival, Spain, Award for Best Actor - Do Paise Ki Dhoop, Chaar Aane Ki Baarish
