= Pradhanmantri (TV series) =

2013 Indian political television series

- Genre: Documentary
- Created by: ABP News
- Directed by: Puneet Sharma
- Narrated by: Shekhar Kapur
- Country of origin: India
- Original language: Hindi
- No. of episodes: 26

Production
- Producer: ABP News
- Running time: 60 minutes

Original release
- Network: ABP News
- Release: 13 July 2013 – 4 January 2014

Pradhanmantri (transl. The Prime Minister) is an Indian television political documentary series, hosted by actor-director Shekhar Kapur on Hindi news channel ABP News. It premiered on 13 July 2013. It aimed to bring to the audience never-seen-before facts of Indian history. The weekly programme chronicles the history of India from 1947 to the present day. The TV series was hosted by the renowned film-maker, actor and host Shekhar Kapur and directed by Puneet Sharma. It was a unique attempt to present the changes in the country during the tenures of 13 prime ministers in the last 65 years. Pradhanmantri aired every Saturday at 10 pm. Raghi Papiya Joshi and Sohan Thakur are casting directors.

The series aired the news telecast of death of Indira Gandhi on Doordarshan by Salma Sultan. Initially conceptualised for 23 episodes, Pradhanmantri was extended to 26 episodes with the last episode aired on 4 January 2014. The show was earlier rumoured to be titled Idea of India.

Pradhanmantri has been re-telecasted in Bengali on ABP Ananda from 14 December 2013, hosted by Bengali actor Dhritiman Chatterjee and re-telecasted in Marathi language on ABP Majha with the name Sinhasan and hosted by Marathi actor Vikram Gokhale from 23 November 2013.

Season 2, christened as Pradhanmantri 2, premiered on ABP News on January 25, 2020. It is again being hosted by actor-director Shekhar Kapur."Pradhanmantri Season -II" will discuss the ideas which will give India its due place in the comity of great nations.

== Cast ==
- Shekhar Kapur as the Narrator
- Akhil Mishra as Lal Bahadur Shastri
- Saurabh Dubey as Jawaharlal Nehru
- Navni Parihar as Indira Gandhi
- Surendra Pal as B. R. Ambedkar
- Shishir Sharma as Hari Singh
- Anang Desai as Sheikh Abdullah
- Prithvi Zutshi as Vallabhbhai Patel
- Shiv Kumar Subramaniam as K. Kamaraj
- Adi Irani as V. P. Menon
- Tej Sapru as Muhammad Ali Jinnah
- Amit Behl as Zulfikar Ali Bhutto
- Rio Kapadia as Sam Manekshaw
- Achyut Potdar as Jayaprakash Narayan
- Ravi Jhankal as P. V. Narasimha Rao
- Mohit Chauhan as J. F. R. Jacob & Rajiv Gandhi
- Harsh Chhaya as Sanjay Gandhi
- Pankaj Berry as Muhammad Mahabat Khan III
- Rajesh Vivek as Raj Narain
- Anwar Fatehan as Charan Singh
- Vinod Kapoor as N. K. Singh, CBI joint director
- Deepak Jethi as Jarnail Singh Bhindranwale
- Devaj Parikh as Narendra Modi
- Ramesh Ramamoorthy as A. P. J. Abdul Kalam
- Suzanne Bernert as Sonia Gandhi
- Vaquar Shaikh as Chandra Shekhar
- Dharmesh Tiwari as Jaswant Singh
- Kishori Shahane as Pupul Jayakar
- Dinesh Kaushik as Siddhartha Shankar Ray
- Naresh Suri as A. A. K. Niazi
- Ashwin Kaushal as Hanwant Singh, ruler of Jaisalmer
- Bhupindder Bhoopii as Harchand Singh Longowal
- Onkar Nath Mishra as Swami Karpatri

== Episodes ==
Episode	Topic	Original Air date
1	Integration of princely states with India	13 July 2013
2	Story of Hyderabad and Junagadh	20 July 2013
3	Story of Kashmir	27 July 2013
4	Story of Madras and Bombay	3 August 2013
5	Hindu code bills	10 August 2013
6	Sino-Indian War	17 August 2013
7	Lal Bahadur Shastri	24 August 2013
8	Indira Gandhi becomes PM	1 September 2013
9	Split in Congress Party	8 September 2013
10	Story before Indo-Pakistani War of 1971	15 September 2013
11	Indo-Pakistani War of 1971 and birth of Bangladesh	22 September 2013
12	1975–77 state of emergency in India	29 September 2013
13	Story of Morarji Desai and Janata Party	5 October 2013
14	Indira Gandhi back as PM and Operation Blue Star	12 October 2013
15	Rajiv Gandhi becomes PM and Shah Bano case	19 October 2013
16	Ayodhya dispute	26 October 2013
17	Rajiv Gandhi and Bofors scandal	2 November 2013
18	Mandal Commission	9 November 2013
19	Rise of LTTE and assassination of Rajiv Gandhi	16 November 2013
20	P. V. Narasimha Rao and corruption charges against him	23 November 2013
21	Atal Bihari Vajpayee's 13 days government and India during 1996–98	30 November 2013
22	Pokhran-II and Kargil War	7 December 2013
23	2002 Gujarat riots and fall of Vajpayee government	14 December 2013
24	Story of Sonia Gandhi and UPA-I government	21 December 2013
25	Scams in UPA government and anti-corruption movement	28 December 2013
26	Untold stories of 6 decades of India	4 January 2014

Pradhanmantri 2 Episodes list
Episode	Topic	Original Air Date
1	The real responsibility for Jammu and Kashmir issue	25 January 2020
2	The country's biggest issue and the real story buried in the documents	1 February 2020
3	Sardar Patel and the story of Article 370	8 February 2020
4	Nehru's 'Kashmir Plan'. Why Jammu and Kashmir was given separate flag, separate constitution	
5	Story of India-Pakistan War and Shimla Agreement	
6	Story of Leftism and Naxalism in India	
7	Who are the Naxalites, what they want, the whole story of the second round of Naxalism in India	
8	Story of the beginning of corruption in India	

== Reception ==
Senior Bharatiya Janata Party leader L. K. Advani praised Pradhanmantri on his blog and public platforms. Retired Indian Police Service (IPS) officer Kiran Bedi and Sunil Shashtri (son of Lal Bahadur Shastri) also praised the series.

=== Social media ===
The show noticed a huge engagement on social media with the #Pradhanmantri trending on Twitter for over 4 days in India on its launch. The hash-tag was promoted heavily by ABP News through a contest on Twitter. The lucky winners of the #Pradhanmantri contest were given K Touch A15 smartphone and a set of 19 books by Rajkamal Prakashan Private Limited on topics like Maanav Samskrithi, modern India, Lokayuth, Bhagath Singh, Prakrithi, Saahithya as gratifications. #Pradhanmantri trended for more than 56 hours, had almost 2.2 million views on YouTube, and had more than 1.2 million mentions on Twitter in 25 weeks.

== Season II ==
Pradhanmantri II (The Prime Minister) is an Indian television political documentary series, hosted by actor-director Shekhar Kapur on Hindi news channel ABP News. This second season premiered on 25 January 2020. The first episodes showed the integration of Kashmir into the Union of India.

== Cast ==
- Saurabh Dubey as Jawaharlal Nehru
- Anang Desai as Sheikh Abdullah
- Prithvi Zutshi as Vallabhbhai Patel
- Vaquar Shaikh as Hari Singh
- Amit Behl as Zulfikar Ali Bhutto
- Navni Parihar as Indira Gandhi
- Shahab Khan as Y. D. Gundevia
- Shekhar Kapoor as the Narrator

== Episodes Season II ==
Episode	Topic	Original Air date
1	Kashmir I	25 January 2020
2	Kashmir II	1 February 2020
3	Kashmir III	8 February 2020
4	Kashmir IV	15 February 2020
5	Kashmir and 1971 India- Pak war	22 February 2020
6	Story of Naxal movement in India - I	29 February 2020
7	Story of Naxal movement in India - II	7 March 2020
8	Corruption in India	14 March 2020

== See also ==
- 7 RCR
- Bharatvarsh
- Bharat Ek Khoj
- Samvidhaan
- Satyamev Jayate
