= List of awards and nominations received by Surekha Sikri =

Surekha Sikri awards and nominations
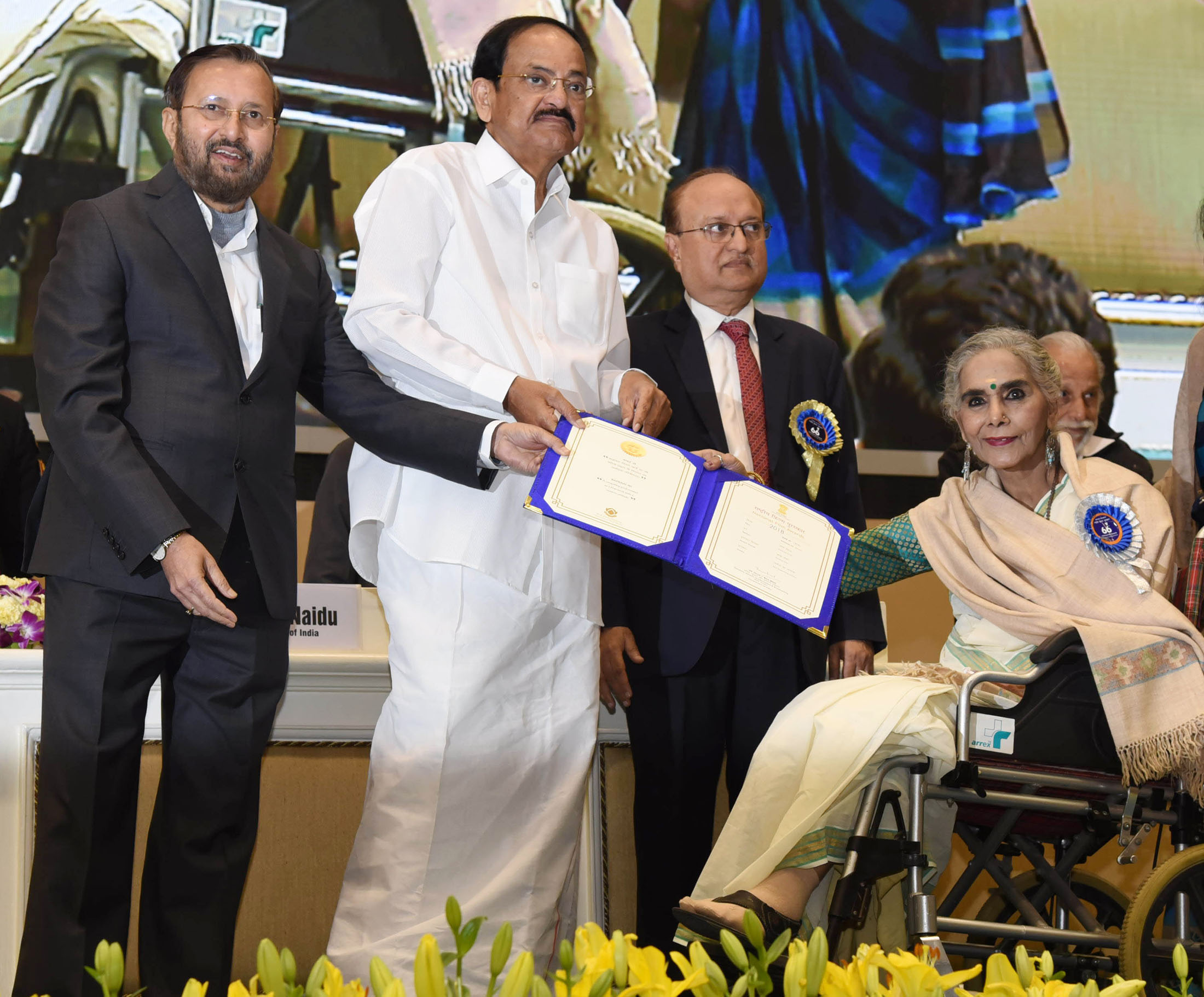
- Sikri receiving the Best Supporting Actress Award for Badhaai Ho at the 66th National Film Awards
Awards and nominations
Award	Wins	Nominations
National Film Awards	3	0
Filmfare Awards	1	0
IIFA Awards	0	1
Indian Television Academy Awards	6	6
Indian Telly Awards	2	5
Screen Awards	1	1
Zee Cine Awards	0	1

Totals (Note: Certain award groups do not simply award one winner. They acknowledge several different recipients, have runners-up, and have third place. Since this is a specific recognition and is different from losing an award, runner-up mentions are considered wins in this award tally. For simplification and to avoid errors, each award in this list has been presumed to have had a prior nomination.)
- Wins: 14
- Nominations: 18

Surekha Sikri (19 April 1945 – 16 July 2021) was an Indian theatre, film and television actress. She has received three National Film Awards, a Filmfare award and six Indian Television Academy awards, among others.

== National Film Awards ==
Year	Work	Category	Result	Ref.
1988	Tamas	Best Supporting Actress	Won	
1995	Mammo	Best Supporting Actress	Won	
2019	Badhaai Ho	Best Supporting Actress	Won	

== Filmfare Awards ==
Year	Work	Category	Result	Ref.
2019	Badhaai Ho	Best Supporting Actress	Won	

== Filmfare OTT Awards ==
Year	Work	Category	Result	Ref.
2020	Ghost Stories	Best Supporting Actress (Web Original)	Nominated	

== IIFA Awards ==
Year	Work	Category	Result	Ref.
2019	Badhaai Ho	Best Supporting Actress	Nominated	

== Indian Television Academy Awards ==
Year	Work	Category	Result	Ref.
2008	Balika Vadhu	Best Actress in a Negative Role	Won	
2009	Balika Vadhu	Best Actress in a Negative Role	Won	
2010	Balika Vadhu	Best Actress - Drama	Won	
2011	Balika Vadhu	Best Actress - Drama	Won	
2014	Balika Vadhu	Best Actress - Drama	Won	
2016	Ek Tha Raja Ek Thi Rani	Best Actress in a Negative Role	Won	

== Indian Telly Awards ==
Year	Work	Category	Result	Ref.
2008	Balika Vadhu	Best Actress in a Negative Role	Won	
2009	Balika Vadhu	Best Actress in a Negative Role	Nominated	
2010	Balika Vadhu	Best Actress in a Negative Role	Nominated	
2013	Balika Vadhu	Best Actress in a Lead Role (Jury)	Won	
2014	Balika Vadhu	Best Actress in a Lead Role (Jury)	Nominated	

== Screen Awards ==
Year	Work	Category	Result	Ref.
2019	Badhaai Ho	Best Supporting Actress	Won	

== Zee Cine Awards ==
Year	Work	Category	Result	Ref.
2019	Badhaai Ho	Best Actor in a Supporting Role – Female	Nominated	

== Other awards ==
Year	Award	Work	Category	Result	Ref.
1989	Sangeet Natak Akademi Award	Herself	Hindi theatre	Honoured	
2011	Colors Golden Petal Awards	Balika Vadhu	Most Anubhavi Personality	Won	
2012	Producers Guild Film Awards	Balika Vadhu	Best Actress in a Drama Series	Nominated	
2019	Critics' Choice Film Awards	Badhaai Ho	Best Supporting Actress (Hindi)	Won	
2019	FOI Online Awards	Badhaai Ho	Best Supporting Actress	Nominated	
2019	FOI Online Awards	Badhaai Ho	Best Performance by an Ensemble Cast	Won	
2019	News18 Reel Movie Awards	Badhaai Ho	Best Supporting Actress	Won	
