= Zubeidaa =

2001 film by Shyam Benegal

- Poster
- Directed by: Shyam Benegal
- Screenplay by: Khalid Mohamed
- Story by: Khalid Mohamed
- Produced by: Farouq Rattonsey
- Starring: Karisma Kapoor; Rekha; Manoj Bajpayee; Rajit Kapur; Amrish Puri; Farida Jalal; Lillete Dubey; Shakti Kapoor
- Cinematography: Rajan Kothari
- Edited by: Aseem Sinha
- Music by: A. R. Rahman
- Production company: FKR Productions
- Distributed by: Yash Raj Films
- Release date: 19 January 2001
- Running time: 153 minutes
- Country: India
- Language: Hindi
- Budget: ₹5 crore
- Box office: ₹8.55 crore

Zubeidaa is a 2001 Indian Hindi-language film directed by Shyam Benegal and written by Khalid Mohammed. It stars Karisma Kapoor, Rekha, Manoj Bajpayee, Surekha Sikri, Rajit Kapoor, Lillete Dubey, Amrish Puri, Farida Jalal, and Shakti Kapoor. A.R. Rahman scored the background music and soundtrack.

Zubeidaa is the concluding chapter in a trilogy that began with Mammo (1994) and continued with Sardari Begum (1996). The film is based on the life of the ill-fated actress Zubeida Begum, who married Hanwant Singh of Jodhpur and was the mother of the film's writer, Khalid Mohamed.

The film garnered the National Film Award for Best Feature Film in Hindi and won Karisma Kapoor a Filmfare Award for Best Actress (Critics). It is regarded by many critics as Kapoor's best performance (alongside Fiza where she also played the title role). The film was highly acclaimed and is regarded as of one of Benegal's best works blurring the lines of commercial and parallel cinema.

== Plot ==
Zubeidaa is the story of Riyaz's search to understand his mother, who is not known to him, as he was brought up by his maternal grandmother in the absence of his mother. His mother's name was Zubeidaa, and she was the only daughter of a filmmaker named Suleman Seth. Zubeidaa acts in films secretly, but when her father finds out, he forbids her to carry on and quickly arranges her marriage to his friend's son, Dr. Mehboob Alam, who becomes a Gharjamai. Things seem happy for her when she gives birth to Riyaz. However, a disagreement arises between Suleman and Mehboob's father, and Mehboob divorces Zubeidaa a few days after she gives birth.

Heartbroken Zubeidaa then meets Maharaja Vijayendra Singh of Fatehpur. Vijayendra is already married to Maharani Mandira Devi and is the father of two children. Nevertheless, he falls in love with Zubeidaa, and they get married, but there is continuous turmoil in their relationship. Riyaz learns through Zubeidaa's journal that though she loved Vijayendra dearly, she was unable to follow the stifling customs of the palace. She was also uncomfortable because of her brother-in-law Uday Singh's sexual advances towards her and his demands of her to have an extramarital affair with him.

Riyaz travels to Fatehpur and asks many people about his mother. However, all except Mandira, whom Zubeidaa called "Mandy Didi," either deny that his mother ever existed or say that she was a horrible woman who seduced their king and caused his death in a plane crash.

On reading the journal, Riyaz finds out that Vijayendra had become a politician and was about to go to Delhi for an important meeting. Zubeidaa felt frustrated that whenever her husband needed help, he looked to Mandira for support, and at the last minute, she insisted that only she would accompany him to the meeting. The plane crashes, killing Zubeidaa and Vijayendra. It is indicated in an introspective scene that Zubeidaa becomes afraid of losing Vijayendra, since she loves him so dearly and thus, decides to kill both herself and him even though she knew it was wrong. She felt that if they cannot be together in this life, they could be together in afterlife for eternity.

In the end, Riyaz gets the missing tape of his mother's only film, from Mandira. The movie ends with him finally getting to watch the film with his grandmother shedding tears of happiness, watching Zubeidaa dancing happily as the spirited soul that she truly was.

== Cast ==
- Karisma Kapoor as Zubeidaa Suleiman Seth / Zubeidaa Mehboob Alam / Rani Meenakshi Devi
- Rekha as Maharani Mandira "Mandy" Devi
- Manoj Bajpayee as Maharaja Vijayendra "Victor" Singh
- Rahul Singh as Raja Digvijay "Uday" Singh (credited Raahul Maharya)
- Rajit Kapur as Riyaz Masud
  - Parzaan Dastur as young Riyaz Masud
- Surekha Sikri as Fayyazi
- Amrish Puri as Suleiman Seth
- Seema Pahwa as Zainab Bi
- Farida Jalal as Mammo
- Shakti Kapoor as Dance Master Hiralal
- Lillete Dubey as Rose Davenport
- Ravi Jhankal as Girivar Singh
- Smriti Mishra as Sardari Begum
- S M Zaheer as Sajid Masud
- Harish Patel as Nandlal Seth

== Soundtrack ==
Zubeidaa – The Story of a Princess

Soundtrack album by A. R. Rahman
- Released: 1 September 2000
- Recorded: Panchathan Record Inn
- Genre: Soundtrack
- Length: 38:18
- Label: Sony Music India
- Producer: A.R. Rahman

A. R. Rahman chronology
Thenali (2000)	Zubeidaa – The Story of a Princess (2000)	One 2 Ka 4 (2001)

Professional ratings
Review scores
Source	Rating
All Music	4.5/5.0 stars

The soundtrack was released in 2000 and features eight tracks, all composed by A. R. Rahman, with lyrics by Javed Akhtar. Lata Mangeshkar collaborated with the musician again for a couple of tracks. Other singers, Kavita Krishnamurthy and Alka Yagnik walked away with all accolades for their renditions in their respective tracks.

#	Song	Artist(s)
1	"Dheeme Dheeme"	Kavita Krishnamurthy
2	"Main Albeli"	Kavita Krishnamurthy, Sukhwinder Singh
3	"Mehndi Hai Rachnewali"	Alka Yagnik
4	"So Gaye Hain"	Lata Mangeshkar
5	"Hai Na"	Alka Yagnik, Udit Narayan
6	"Pyaara Sa Gaon"	Lata Mangeshkar
7	"So Gaye Hain"	Lata Mangeshkar, Chorus
8	"Chhodo More Baiyyan"	Richa Sharma

== Reception ==
Suman Tarafdar of Filmfare described the film as "very much a classy Benegal film, with new explorations of the human relationships in their multi-layered frameworks" and praised Kapoor "for having come up with such an assured performance". In her review for The Tribune, Aradhika Sekhon stated that the film is “a milestone as far as women-oriented movies are concerned,” and that Kapoor “surpassed herself as the passionate, defiant, wilful and troubled Zubeidaa, the truly modern woman.“ Ziya Us Salam of The Hindu found it to be "among the better offerings of Benegal," and was positive of Kapoor and Rekha's performances, but termed Bajpayee's performance as "not-so-convincing."

== Awards ==
- National Film Award for Best Feature Film in Hindi
- Filmfare Critics Award for Best Actress – Karisma Kapoor
