= Suraj Ka Satvan Ghoda =

- Theatrical release poster
- Directed by: Shyam Benegal
- Screenplay by: Shama Zaidi
- Story by: Dharmavir Bharati
- Based on: The Sun's seventh horse (novel) by Dharmavir Bharati
- Produced by: National Film Development Corporation of India
- Starring: Rajit Kapur; Amrish Puri; Neena Gupta; Rajeshwari Sachdev; Pallavi Joshi
- Narrated by: Raghuvir Yadav
- Cinematography: Piyush Shah
- Music by: Vanraj Bhatia
- Release date: 1992
- Running time: 130 min
- Country: India
- Language: Hindi
- Budget: ₹ 5 crore

Suraj Ka Satvan Ghoda (lit. 'The Sun's Seventh Horse') is a 1992 Indian Hindi film directed by Shyam Benegal and based on the novel The Sun's Seventh Horse by Dharmavir Bharati. It won the 1993 National Film Award for Best Feature Film in Hindi. The self-reflexive film is also known for its subversive take on the "Devdas" syndrome. The film was produced by the National Film Development Corporation of India (NFDC). It stars Rajit Kapur, Rajeshwari Sachdev, Pallavi Joshi, Neena Gupta and Amrish Puri, among others.

== Overview ==
The storyteller Manek Mulla (played by Rajit Kapur) tells his friends three stories of three women he had known at different points of time in his life: Rajeshwari Sachdev (a metaphor for the middle class), Pallavi Joshi (the intellectual and affluent), and Neena Gupta (the poor). The three stories are revealed to be three different strands of a single tale as seen from the points of view of the different lead characters in the film.

The lowest, slowest or the weakest in a group or society determines the speed or progress of the whole. The title of the film, a metaphor for the film itself, draws an analogy between society and the mythological iconography of the Sun's chariot drawn by seven horses.

The narrative style adds to the abstractness; the film is presented as a flashback of a contemporary artist, Shyam (played by Raghuvir Yadav). He remembers the many stories narrated by Mulla, a born raconteur during their gossip sessions with two of their mutual friends.

== Cast ==
- Rajit Kapur as Manek Mulla; Story-teller
- K.K. Raina as Manek Mulla's brother
- Raghuvir Yadav as Narrator; Shyam, Manek Mulla's friend
- Amrish Puri as Mahesar Dalal
- Rajeshwari Sachdev as Jamuna
- Riju Bajaj as Tanna
- Anang Desai as Jamuna's father
- Mohini Sharma as Jamuna's mother
- Suresh Bhagwat as Jamuna's husband; zamindar
- Pallavi Joshi as Lalita; also known as Lily
- Ila Arun as Lily's mother
- Neena Gupta as Satti
- Lalit Mohan Tiwari as Chaman Thakur; Satti's adoptive uncle
- Virendra Saxena as Shopkeeper
- Himani Shivpuri as Roma Bibi, a distant relative of Jamuna
- Ravi Jhankal as Ramdhan

== Music ==
1. "Yeh Shamen Sabki Shamen" - Udit Narayan, Kavita Krishnamurthy
2. "Yeh Shamen Sabki Shamen v2" - Udit Narayan, Kavita Krishnamurthy
