= Bharat Ek Khoj =

Indian television series

- Bharat Ek Khoj DVD cover
- Genre: Historical fiction
- Created by: Shyam Benegal
- Based on: The Discovery of India by Jawaharlal Nehru
- Written by: Shyam Benegal; Shama Zaidi; Sunil Shanbag; Vasant Dev (dialogues)
- Starring: Roshan Seth; Om Puri; Tom Alter; Sadashiv Amrapurkar; Naseeruddin Shah; Lucky Ali; Seema Kelkar; Mita Vashisht; Pallavi Joshi; Anjan Srivastav; Sohaila Kapur; Ila Arun; Irrfan Khan; Ravi Jhankal; Piyush Mishra; Kulbhushan Kharbanda; Subrat Bose; Pankaj Berry
- Narrated by: Om Puri
- Opening theme: Vanraj Bhatia
- Country of origin: India
- No. of seasons: 1
- No. of episodes: 53

Production
- Executive producer: Raj Pius
- Cinematography: V. K. Murthy
- Editors: Bela Bhansali; Sanjay Leela Bhansali; Dilip Panda; Chakradhar Sahu; Ashok Swami
- Production companies: Doordarshan; Sahyadri Films

Original release
- Network: DD National
- Release: 13 November 1988 – 12 November 1989

Bharat Ek Khoj (lit. 'India: An Exploration') is a 53-episode Indian historical drama based on the book The Discovery of India (1946) by Jawaharlal Nehru that covers a 5,000-year history of the Indian subcontinent from its beginnings to independence from the British in 1947. The drama was directed, written and produced by Shyam Benegal with cinematographer V. K. Murthy in 1988 for state-owned Doordarshan. Shama Zaidi co-wrote the script. Its cast includes Om Puri, Roshan Seth, Tom Alter and Sadashiv Amrapurkar. Jawaharlal Nehru was portrayed by Roshan Seth, whom he also portrayed in the film Gandhi.

Production designer Nitish Roy with assistants Samir Chanda and Nitin Chandrakant Desai built 144 sets for the series.

== Episodes ==
No.	Title	Cast	Role	Original release date
1	"Bharat Mata Ki Jai"	Roshan Seth	Jawaharlal Nehru	TBA
2	"The Beginnings"	Harish Patel, Lalit Mohan Tiwari, Pallavi Joshi	Draha, Shulgi, Atri	TBA
A street play based on the Epic of Gilgamesh is also depicted in the episode.
3	"The Arrival of the Vedic People"	Anang Desai, K K Raina, Ravi Jhankal	Sardar, Suteja, Bajbandha	TBA
4	"Caste Formation"	Anang Desai, Salim Ghouse, K K Raina, Lalit Mohan Tiwari, Inayatullah Kantroo, Anuradha Tarafdar, Ila Arun	Chandraprabha, Rama, Narada, Arjuna, Dhanpal, Dhanvati, Sheelvati	TBA
Story of Shambuka from Ramayana and Ekalavya from Mahabharata were also part of this episode.
5–6	"Mahabharata"	Teejan Bai, Salim Ghouse, Om Puri, Sujata Mehta, Pankaj Berry, Ila Arun, Salim Ghouse, Sulakshana Khatri	TBA	TBA
7–8	"Ramayana"	Om Puri, Pallavi Joshi, Salim Ghouse , Pankaj Berry, Ravi Jhankal	Sita, Rama, Bharata, Lakshmana	TBA
9	"Republics and Kingdoms"	Virendra Saxena, K K Raina	Mahaanaman, Virudhaka	TBA
10	"Negation and Acceptance of Life"	Dhruv Ghanekar, Aanjjan Srivastav, Om Puri, Ashutosh Gowariker	Nachiketa, Yamaraja, Angulimaal, Gautam Buddha	TBA
11–12	"Chanakya and Chandragupta"	Satyadev Dubey, Ravi Jhankal, Zarvan Patel, Mita Vashisht, Aanjjan Srivastav	Kauṭilya, Chandragupta Maurya, Alexander the Great, Suvasini, Dhana Nanda	TBA
13–14	"Ashoka"	Om Puri, K.K.Raina, Ila Arun, Lucky Ali (credited as Maqsoom Ali)	Ashoka, Radhagupta, Asandhimitra, Prince Tissa	TBA
15–16	"The Sangam Period: Silapaddikaram"	Pallavi Joshi, Sulabha Deshpande, Virendra Saxena Rakesh Dhar	Kannaki, Kovalan, Kavundi, Pandit	TBA
17	"The Classical Age"	Anjan Srivastav, Harish Patel, Aparjita Krishna	Sansthanaka, Nai, Vasantsena	TBA
18–19	"Kalidas and Shakuntala"	Ravi Jhankal, Pallavi Joshi, Virendra Saxena	Kalidas, Mallika, Matul	TBA
20	"Harshavardhana"	Pankaj Berry, K Makhija, Aparajita	Harshavardhana, Prabhakar Vardhana, Queen	TBA
21	"Bhakti"	Vijay Kashyap, Rajesh Vivek, Mita Vashisht, Harish Patel	Mahendravarman I, Kapalin, Devasoma, Buddhist Monk	TBA
22	"The Chola Empire"	Om Puri, Devendre Malhotra, Sunila Pradhan, Shantanu Chaparia	Raja Raja Chola, Ishanashiva, Mahadevi, Tirumala	TBA
23	"The Chola Empire"	Om Puri, Devendre Malhotra, Sunila Pradhan, Shantanu Chaparia	Raja Raja Chola, Ishanashiva, Mahadevi, Tirumala	TBA
24	"The Delhi Sultanate. Part 1: The Arrival of Turk-Afghans and Prithviraj Rasoe"	K.K. Raina, Vijay Kashyap, Ravi Jhankal, Ahmed Khan, Irrfan Khan, Achyut Potdar, Vijay Kashyap	Muhammad Ghori, Chand Bardai, Prithviraj Chauhan, Mahmud Ghazni, Ferdowsi, Al-Biruni	TBA
25	"The Delhi Sultanate. Part 2: Prithviraj Raso and Alauddin Khilji"	K.K. Raina, Vijay Kashyap, Ravi Jhankal, Achyut Potdar, Om Puri, Rajendra Gupta, Seema Kelkar	Muhammad Ghori, Chand Bardai, Makwana, Alauddin Khilji, Ratan Singh, Padmavati	TBA
26	"The Delhi Sultanate. Part 3: Padmavat and Tughlaq dynasty"	Om Puri, Rajendra Gupta, Seema Kelkar,	Alauddin Khalji, Ratan Singh, Padmavati	TBA
27	"Synthesis"	Pankaj Berry	Lorik, [Lubna salim] chanda, [Maina], Aparajita	TBA
28	"The Vijayanagar Empire"	Om Puri, Salim Ghouse, Aanjjan Srivastav, Fr. Tasso	Krishna Deva Raya, Aliya Rama Raya, Appaji, Domingo Paes	TBA
29	"Feudalism"	Salim Ghouse, Ila Arun, Pallavi Joshi, Siraj Khan, Ajay Kumar	Aliya Rama Raya, Heggaditi, Mallige, Saguna, Achyuta Deva Raya	TBA
30	"The Fall of the Vijayanagar Empire"	Salim Ghouse, Anang Desai, Pankaj Berry, Ahmed Khan, Arjun Raina	Aliya Rama Raya, Effendi Aslam Bain, Ibrahim Quli Qutb Shah Wali, Hussain Nizam Shah I, Ali Adil Shah I	TBA
31	"Rana Sanga, Ibrahim Lodi and Babur"	Ravi Jhankal, Anang Desai, Lalit Mohan Tiwari, Mushtaq Khan, Vishal Singh	Rana Sanga, Ibrahim Lodi, Babur	TBA
32–33	"Akbar"	Kulbhushan Kharbanda, Ila Arun, Aparajita Bhushan, Puneet Issar, Surendra Pal, Harish Patel, Irrfan Khan, Rajesh Vivek, Pankaj Berry, Vijay Arora, Virendra Saxena, Arun Bakshi, Deepraj Rana	Akbar, Jahangir, Jodhabai, Maharana Pratap, Man Singh I	TBA
34	"Golden Hind"	Sudhir Kulkarni, Vijay Arora, Ajit Vachhani, Mushtaq Khan	Jahangir, Shah Jahan, Thomas Roe	TBA
35–36	"Aurangzeb"	Om Puri, Sudhir Dalvi, Surendra Pal, Surekha Sikri, Navtej Hundal, Dharmesh Tiwari	Aurangzeb, Dara Shikoh, Murad Bakhsh, Shah Shuja, Jahanara Begum, Shah Jahan	TBA
37–38	"Shivaji"	Naseeruddin Shah, Om Puri, Anang Desai, Achyut Potdar, Vishwajeet Pradhan Ahmed Khan	Shivaji, Jijabai, Dadoji Kondadev, Chandrarao More, Afzal Khan, Aurangzeb,	TBA
39	"Company Bahadur (East India Company)"	Amrish Puri, Rajendra, Jalal Agha, Tom Alter, Vishal Singh, John Holyer	Robert Clive, Najimuddin Ali Khan, Shuja-ud-Daula, Maharaja Nandakumar, Shah Alam II, Diwani Rights	TBA
40	"Tipu Sultan"	Salim Ghouse, Vijay Kashyap, Ravi Jhankal, Shreechand Makhija, Tom Alter, John Holyer	Tipu Sultan, Purnaiah, Mir Sadiq, Mahadji Scindia, Nana Phadnavis	TBA
41	"The Bengal Renaissance and Raja Ram Mohan Roy"	Anang Desai, Urmila Bhatt, Ravi Jhankal, Tom Alter, John Holyer	Raja Ram Mohan Roy, Lord William Bentinck, Henry Louis Vivian Derozio, Bann on Sati (practice)	TBA
42–43	"1857"	Om Puri, Ravi Jhankal, Piyush Mishra, Mohan Gokhale, Anang Desai, Ratna Pathak Shah, Aanjjan Srivastav, Pankaj Berry, Virendra Razdan, Tom Alter, John Holyer, Bob Christo	Bahadur Shah Zafar, Nanasaheb Peshwa, Wajid Ali Shah, Begum Hazrat Mahal, Tantia Tope, Rani Lakshmibai, Azimullah Khan, Bakht Khan, Mangal Pandey, Lord Dalhousie	TBA
44	"Indigo Revolt"	Virendra Saxena, Tom Alter, Vijay Kashyap	Madhav	TBA
45	"Mahatma Phule"	Sadashiv Amrapurkar, Mohan Gokhale, Shubhangi Gokhale, Achyut Potdar, Ashok Banthia	Mahatma Phule, Savitribai Phule, Satyashodak Samaj	TBA
46	"Sir Syed Ahmed Khan"	Mohan Maharishi, Irrfan Khan	TBA	TBA
47	"Vivekananda"	Alok Nath	Swami Vivekananda	TBA
48	"Extremists and Moderates"	Sudhir Kulkarni, Mohan Gokhale, Tom Alter, Achyut Potdar, Kishor Kadam	Gopal Krishna Gokhale, Bal Gangadhar Tilak, Chapekar brothers, Murder of Walter Charles Rand	TBA
49–50	"And Gandhi Came"	Om Puri, Ila Arun, Piyush Mishra, Shabana Azmi, Pallavi Joshi, Akhilendra Mishra	TBA	TBA
51	"Separatism"	S M Zaheer, K K Raina, Harish Patel, Irrfan Khan	TBA	TBA
52	"Do or Die"	Pankaj Berry, Om Puri, Lucky Ali	Quit India Movement	TBA
53	"Epilogue"	TBA	TBA	TBA

== Broadcast ==
The 53-episode series was launched in November 1988, coinciding with the birth centenary of Nehru. The series was re-telecast on DD Bharati from 27 May 2013 on the occasion of Nehru's 49th death anniversary.

== See also ==
- Pradhanmantri (TV series)
- Bharatvarsh (TV series)
- List of television shows based on Indian history
