= K for Kishore =

Indian television singing contest series

- Created by: Supavitra Babul
- Directed by: Sudesh Bhonsle
- Country of origin: India
- No. of seasons: 1
- No. of episodes: 39

Production
- Editor: Umma Mishrra
- Production company: Miditech

Original release
- Network: Sony Entertainment Television
- Release: 21 December 2007 – 4 May 2008

K for Kishore is an Indian television singing contest that was broadcast on Sony Entertainment Television India, from 21 December 2007, to 4 May 2008, with a four-hour grand finale. The show was created to determine which of 12 contestants, all professional and seasoned singers, was most able to sing songs 'similarly' to singer Kishore Kumar. The show featured popular judges and music directors. The series was opted for only the votes of the judges and the audience in the studio for deciding the singers who come closest to the singer Kishore Kumar.

== Judges ==
- Bappi Lahiri
- Amit Kumar
- Sudesh Bhonsle

== Guests ==
- Leena Chandavarkar
- Asha Parekh
- Kumar Sanu
- Alka Yagnik
- Vinod Rathod
- Hema Sardesai
- Javed Akhtar
- Nagesh Kukunoor (extended guest)
- Asha Bhonsle
- Rajesh Khanna (grand finale)
- Kunal Khemu
- Atif Aslam

== Hosts ==
- Rajeshwari Sachdev
- Babul Supriyo

== First participants ==
- Arnab Chakraborty (Team: Jhumroos) --- Winner
- Chintan Bakiwala (Team: Bangdoos) --- 1st runner-up
- Chetan Rana (Team: Bangdoos) --- 2nd runner-up
- Nayan Rathore (Team: Bangdoos) -- Eliminated
- Vinod Seshadri (Team: Jhumroos) -- Eliminated
- Sameer Memon (Team: Jhumroos) -- Eliminated
- Apurva (Team: Jhumroos) -- Eliminated
- Pramod Rampal (Team: Jhumroos) -- Eliminated
- Harsh Vyas (Team: Jhumroos) -- Eliminated
- Milind Ingle (Team: Jhumroos) -- Eliminated
- Suhas Sawant (Team: Bangdoos) -- Eliminated
- Kshitij Wagh (Team: Bangdoos) -- Eliminated
- Saurabh Ghosh (Team: Bangdoos) -- Eliminated
- Babar Chandio (Team:Chandio) -- Eliminated

== Challengers ==
- Shailendra Kumar-winner
- Amit Paul—Eliminated (due to ill health )
- Amanat Ali—Eliminated
- Rex D' Souza—Eliminated
- Anil Srivastva—Eliminated
- Sikander Ali—Eliminated
