= Ravi Jhankal =

Indian television, stage and film actor

- Born: Jaipur, Rajasthan
- Occupation: Actor
- Years active: 1986–present
- Spouse: Anita

Ravi Jhankal is an Indian television, stage and film actor, mostly known for working in Shyam Benegal's films, including Welcome to Sajjanpur (2008) and Well Done Abba (2010) and for the role of P. V. Narasimha Rao in Pradhanmantri (TV Series). He is also part of Surnai, Mumbai-based theatre group.

He has graduated from National School of Drama, Delhi.

== Filmography ==
=== Films ===
- Panchlait (2017)
- NH10 (2015) as Fauji Mama
- Samrat & Co. (2014) as Puran Kaka
- Chillar Party (2011) as Sutli Bomb uncle
- Agneepath (2012)
- Well Done Abba (2010)
- Welcome to Sajjanpur (2008) as Munnibai Mukhanni
- Mangal Pandey: The Rising (2005) as Sufi Singer on Elephant
- Sehar (2005) as Police officer
- Paheli (2005) as Supporter against Bhanwarlal (Anupam Kher) with Mohan Bhandari
- Koi Mil Gaya (2003) as Mr Chaturvedi, Maths Teacher
- Hawayein (2003)
- Kyon (2003) as Home Minister Rajiv Desai
- Zubeidaa (2001) as Girivar Singh
- Bawandar (2000) as Police Inspector
- Fiza (2000) as Minister
- Samar (1999) as Chamak Singh
- Sardari Begum (1996) as Police Inspector
- Oh Darling Yeh Hai India (1995)
- Mammo (1994) as Inspector Sapre
- Tarpan (The Absolution) (1994) as Joravar
- Rudaali (1993)
- City of Joy (1992) as Obstructing Policeman
- Antarnaad (1991) as Ranchod Singh
- Susman (1987)
- Kirayadar (1986)
- Chameli Ki Shaadi (1986)

=== Television ===
- Katha Sagar
- Yatra (Doordarshan)
- Mr. Yogi (TV series) as Jitubhai
- Tenali Rama (Doordarshan) as the man who digs a well for Tenali Rama in an episode
- Junoon as Manish Mahajan
- Aahat multiple characters
- Swabhimaan
- Byomkesh Bakshi (1993) as Amar Raha in the episode Tasvir Chor and Inspector Sarkar in the episodes Chakrant, Dhokadhari, Sahi ka Kanta, Veni Sanhar, and Lohe ka Biscuit
- Uljhan (2008)
- Hitler Didi (2013)
- Devon ke Dev Mahadev (2013) as Lohitang's Guru
- Tehreer…Munsi Premchand Ki-Thakur ka kuan(Doordarshan) as Thakur
- Pradhanmantri (TV Series) (2013) as P. V. Narasimha Rao
- Samvidhaan (2014) as Seth Govind Das
- Bharat Ek Khoj as "Ravi Jhankal", who played the most and some very important roles, which include Laxman, Dusyant, Chandragupta Maurya, Rana Sanga, Prithviraj Chauhan and many more...
- Savdhaan India (2017) in a few episodes
- Ramyug (2020) as a guru maharaj
- Rajjo (2022) as Keshav Singh Thakur
- Bekaboo as Narrator
