= Bawandar =

Dhindhora Bawandar
- Directed by: Jag Mundhra
- Written by: Screenplay: Ashok Mishra, Sudha Arora; Dialogue: Hariram Acharya, Deepak Purohit; Jag Mundhra (written by)
- Produced by: Gaurang Doshi; Jag Mundhra
- Starring: Deepti Naval, Nandita Das
- Cinematography: Ashok Kumar
- Edited by: Jag Mundhra
- Music by: Vishwa Mohan Bhatt
- Release date: 17 November 2000
- Running time: 125 minutes
- Country: India
- Languages: Hindi; Rajasthani; English

Bawandar (English title: The Sand Storm) is a 2000 Indian film, based on the true story of Bhanwari Devi, a rape victim from Rajasthan, India. The film depicts the personal trauma, public humiliation and legal injustice that Bhanwari Devi went through, while pursuing justice in the Indian courts.

== Plot ==
Bawandar is based on the true story of Bhanwari Devi's gang-rape case. The names of characters and places have been changed for legal reasons. For example, Bhanwari's character is called Sanwari, her husband Mohan's character is called Sohan, and their village is called Dhabri (Bhateri in real life).

The story is introduced through first-person narration by a foreign reporter called Amy (Laila Rouass), who has read about Sanwari's case in a newspaper. Amy and her friend-cum-interpreter Ravi (Rahul Khanna) visit Sanwari's village to investigate the matter, five years after the gang-rape incident. Upon their arrival in Rajasthan, Amy and Ravi meet a rickshaw-puller named Sohan (Raghuvir Yadav) by happenstance, who helps them on their way to a village where they encounter Sanwari's rapists. Sohan turns out to be Sanwari's husband, and tells the tale of Sanwari's rape case.

Sohan and Sanwari are a married couple belonging to a low-caste Kumhar (potter) community. The couple live with Sohan's parents and have a two children, a young girl and a boy. Sanwari makes pots whilst Sohan plies the rickshaw for their subsistence. While working at a local quarry, Sanwari stands up for her rights to the corrupt supervisor. The news of her bravery reaches Shobha Devi (Deepti Naval), a social worker who works for the Government of India. Her job involves creating awareness amongst the illiterate villagers against social evils like child marriage, oppression of women etc. In Dhabri, she recruits Sanwari (Nandita Das) as a Saathin, a grassroots worker employed as part of the Women's Development Project run by the Government of Rajasthan.

As part of her job, Sanwari educates the womenfolk in the village against child marriages and oppression against women, and invites ire of the conservative village elders. Most of these villagers belong to the Gurjar community, a higher caste. To subjugate Sanwari, five members of the Gurjar community order a social and economic boycott of Sanwari and her family. The villagers stop selling milk to her family or buying the earthen pots they make. When Sanwari informs the police about a child marriage happening in the Gurjar community, five men from the Gurjar household where the marriage was supposed to happen decide to teach Sanwari a lesson. Having had enough of her shenanigans and what they perceive as her affront to their male ego, they collectively beat up her husband and two of them take turns in gang-raping her.

Despite the horrific nature of the incident and the stigma attached to it, Sanwari and Sohan muster up courage and go to the police station to lodged a First Information Report, but the corrupt inspector (Ravi Jhankal) refuses to lodge the FIR in absence of a medical report. The doctor refuses to issue a medical report in the absence of a court order, explaining that he cannot do so because it's a rape case. With Shobha's help, the couple finally manages to get a court order. With the court order, they get a medical test done in Jaipur, and a complaint is lodged two days after the incident.

However, the rapists are not arrested and roam around freely, boasting about their lustful experience with Sanwari. Sanwari's case gets nationwide attention after the head of a women's NGO in Delhi gets involved and tries to help Sanwari. The Prime Minister of India himself entrusts the investigation to the Central Bureau of Investigation and offers Rs. 1 lakh as support to Sanwari from the Prime Minister's Relief Fund.

The accused are arrested and tried in the court, but they are backed by the local MLA Dhanraj Meena (Govind Namdeo). Meena hires a lawyer called Purohit to defend the accused. A Gurjar lawyer (Gulshan Grover) defends Saanwari, but faces pressure from his community to favor the accuse. The judges handling the case are transferred multiple times, and the final judgement goes against her, with all 5 of the accused walking away scot free.

The movie ends with actress Deepti Naval talking about how Bhanwari Devi had refused to give up her fight for justice, in spite of unhelpful villagers and relatives, an incompetent police force, and a corrupt judicial system, and is today active as a rape activist who helps provide help, counseling and inspiration to women who have suffered such injustices as well.

== Cast ==
- Nandita Das - Saanvri
- Raghuvir Yadav - Sohan (Saanvri's husband)
- Deepti Naval - Shobha Devi
- Rahul Khanna - Ravi
- Laila Rouass - Amy
- Govind Namdeo - Dhanraj Meena (MLA)
- Ishrat Ali - Purnia Gujjar (sarpanch)
- Yashpal Sharma - Sarju
- Lalit Tiwari - Tej Karan
- Anupam Shyam - Mangal Panda (pandit)
- Ashok Banthia
- Shri Vallabh Vyas - (as Shrivallabh Vyas)
- Ravi Jhankal - Police Inspector
- Mohan Bhandari
- Lillete Dubey

== Controversies ==
Before the film's release, Bhanwari Devi stated that the filmmakers didn't discuss the film with her, she never took any money from them and she wasn't shown the film. Sukhmani Singh, a journalist, reported that Bhanwari Devi was "weary, resigned and bitter". According to him, a small-time political worker and businessman describing Bhanwari as a "rakhi sister" had brokered a deal with Mundhra for the film. The director Jag Mundhra stated that he had screened the film for Bhanwari and her family. He also stated that he took Bhanwari to HDFC Bank's Jaipur branch, opened an account in her name, and deposited £3,000 from the film's London charity show in the account. According to him, Bhnawari might be reluctant to admit receiving the money, fearing opposition from women activists. In 2007, Shivam Vij reported that "Bhanwari Devi is most angry with those who made the film Bawandar".

Some women's organizations opposed the film due to concerns about Bhanwari Devi being exposed to hostile public scrutiny. The police also felt that the film "falsifies their role inexcusably". There was also concern that the film may end up annoying the Gurjar community, to which the accused belong. The State Government was apprehensive about the film leading to caste-based tensions.

The film was submitted to the examining committee of the Central Board of Film Certification on 18 September 2000. The committee head Asha Parekh despatched it to the revising committee, which saw the film on 6 October, and gave it the expected "Adult" certificate. It recommended five cuts, two of which were described by the journalist Pinki Virani as "grotesquely unfair to Bhanwari Devi". The first cut was Bhanwari Devi and her husband being held down by men, as she is raped by an uncle-nephew pair. The censors found inappropriate the forcing apart of the woman's legs. The second cut was the "visuals of suggestive masturbation by a police officer".

== Music ==
The music of the film was composed by Vishwa Mohan Bhatt, and released under the label Saregama. It featured the following tracks:

- Aayo Holi, sung by Sapna Awasthi and Ram Shankar
- Ab To Jagna Hi Hoga
- Ab To Jagya, sung by Mahalakshmi Iyer and chorus
- Ghaghario, sung by Sapna Awasthi
- Har Aayo, sung by Parmeshwari and chorus
- Ab To Jagya - 2
- Ab To Jagya - 3, sung by Sonali Vajpayee
- Kesaria (Instrumental)
- Kesaria (Sad), sung by Rita Ganguly
- Kesaria
- Panghat
- Tumse Achha Kaun Hai, sung by K Vikas

== Awards ==
The film was showcased at several international film festivals and won multiple awards:

- Audience Choice Award, Bermuda International Film Festival (2001)
- Political Film Society, USA (PFS) Award - Peace Category (2004)
- Best Actress (Nandita Das), Santa Monica Film Festival
- 2001: Zanzibar International Film Festival: Golden Dhow
- 2001: V. Shantaram Award for Best Cinematography
