= Khalid Mohamed =

Indian journalist and film director

- Education: Cathedral & John Connon
- Occupations: Director, screenwriter, film critic
- Years active: 1994–present
- Known for: Fiza, Silsiilay
- Mother: Zubeida Begum

Khalid Mohamed is an Indian journalist, editor, film critic, screenwriter and film director. He worked for The Times of India for 27 years and then DNA followed by Hindustan Times and was the lead editor for Filmfare magazine. He is the son of Zubeida Begum, on whose life he wrote the screenplay of Shyam Benegal's 2001 film, Zubeidaa.

== Education and career ==
An alumnus of Cathedral and John Connon School from Fort, Mumbai and St Xavier's College, he post-graduated in Political Science. Mohamed has directed three Hindi films and written the scripts of three films for Shyam Benegal, besides making three documentaries The Last Irani Chai, Little Big People and Master: Portrait, and staging the play Kennedy Bridge. At the Hindustan Times he served as the national cultural editor as well as the editor of the supplement HT Cafe. He left Hindustan Times in January 2002. Mohamed has only given a few films a 5-star rating. These include Satya (1998) and Slumdog Millionaire (2008).

Mohamed has written several articles for The Wire, Firstpost, Quint, Variety, India Today and DNA India. He's also written scripts for three of Shyam Benegal's films, namely, Mammo, Sardari Begum and Zubeida. Mohamed later went on to make a documentary on Shyam Benegal, titled, The Master. Mohamed also wrote the play, Kennedy Bridge.

== Filmography ==
=== As director and screenwriter ===
- Fiza (2000)
- Tehzeeb (2003)
- Silsiilay (2005)

=== As screenwriter ===
- Mammo (1994)
- Sardari Begum (1996)
- Zubeidaa (2001)

=== As writer and reporter ===
- To Be Or Not To Be: Amitabh Bachchan, a biography of Bollywood superstar Amitabh Bachchan
- Mohamed, Khalid (2012). Two Mother and Other Stories. Om Books. ISBN 978-9381607091.
- The Hit Girl, a biography of veteran actress Asha Parekh.
- The Aladia Sisters, the story of six sisters of a patriarchal Muslim family
