= Ashok Mishra =

Indian screenplay writer and lyricist

Ashok Mishra is an Indian screenplay writer and lyricist in Bollywood films. He is most noted for his work in the Shyam Benegal film Welcome to Sajjanpur (in which he wrote the lyrics for the songs Sita Ram, Dildara Dildara Sine Mein, Aadmi Aazad Hai and Munni Ki Baari Are Mandir).

== Filmography ==
- Kathal: A Jackfruit Mystery

2023

- Walk Alone (2021)
- Ganje ki Kali (2013)
- Well Done Abba!
- Welcome to Sajjanpur (2008)
- Bawandar (2000)
- Samar (1998)
- Naseem (1995)
- Bharat Ek Khoj (1988)
