= Samvidhaan =

- Also known as: Samvidhaan: The Making of the Constitution of India
- Genre: Documentary
- Created by: Rajya Sabha TV
- Written by: Shama Zaidi and Atul Tiwari
- Directed by: Shyam Benegal
- Starring: Sachin Khedekar; Dalip Tahilramani; Suzanne Bernert; Divya Dutta; Rajit Kapur; Tom Alter; Neeraj Kabi; Rahul Singh
- Narrated by: Swara Bhaskar
- Original languages: Hindi; English
- No. of episodes: 10

Production
- Producer: For Rajya Sabha TV by Shyam Benegal Sahyadri Films
- Cinematography: Akashdeep Pandey
- Running time: 52 minutes

Original release
- Network: YouTube
- Release: 2 March – 4 May 2014

Samvidhaan: The Making of the Constitution of India is a ten-part television mini-series based on the making of the Constitution of India, directed by Shyam Benegal. The show premiered on 2 March 2014 on Rajya Sabha TV, with an episode scheduled to air every Sunday morning. The series can be viewed on YouTube on Rajya Sabha TV's channel.

== Making ==
Shama Zaidi and Atul Tiwari are writers of the series. Zaidi said that it took her six months to write the script. The material came from debates, committee meetings and biographies of Jawaharlal Nehru and Mahatma Gandhi. Many of the famous speeches of India's freedom fighters figure in the series. Swara Bhaskar has hosted and narrated the show. The series was shot in Film City, Mumbai and recreates the debates that took place before the drafting of the Constitution of India. Dayal Nihalani is the associate director of the mini-series. For the series, a replica of the Central Hall of Parliament during the time of the Constituent Assembly was set up.

The first look of Samvidhaan was unveiled on 24 September 2013. The first look was officially launched on 20 February 2014, the pen-ultimate day of 15th Lok Sabha by President Pranab Mukherjee in Parliament House, New Delhi. Music is composed by Shantanu Moitra.

== Episodes ==
Episode No.	Episode Name
1	The First Step: Cabinet Mission To Objectives Resolution
2	Independence: A Divided Legacy
3	Independent India: Righting Fundamental Wrongs with Fundamental Rights
4	People's Rights, Principles of Governance and Duties
5	Strengthening The Weak: Minority, Women and Backward Rights
6	Whose Land Is It?: Land Reforms And Acquisition
7	Link Language: Hindi Or Hindustani?
8	Federalism: Linking The States And The Centre
9	Three Pillars: Executive, Legislature, Judiciary
10	From Preamble to the Final Draft and beyond

== Cast ==
- Sachin Khedekar as B. R. Ambedkar
- Dalip Tahil as Jawaharlal Nehru
- Utkarsh Majumdar as Vallabhbhai Patel
- Tom Alter as Maulana Azad
- Neeraj Kabi as Mahatma Gandhi
- Rakesh Pandey as Sachchidananda Sinha
- Kaizaad Kotwal as Frank Anthony
- Ivan Rodrigues as P. Subbarayan
- Shyam Kishore as Laxminarayan Sahu
- Devendra Sharma as Shyam Nandan Sahay
- Ila Arun as Hansa Mehta
- Amit Behl as C. Rajagopalachari
- K. K. Raina as Kanaiyalal Maneklal Munshi
- Rajendra Gupta as Rajendra Prasad
- Aanjjan Srivastav as Bal Krishna Sharma Naveen
- Mohit Chauhan as Brajeshwar Prasad
- Suzanne Bernert as a journalist
- Narendra Jha as Muhammad Ali Jinnah
- Divya Dutta as Purnima Banerjee
- Rajeshwari Sachdev as Amrit Kaur
- Rajit Kapur as Alladi Krishnaswamy Iyer
- Harish Patel as M. A. Ayyangar
- Imran Hasnee as Nawab of Bhopal Hamidullah Khan
- Kenneth Desai as Shyama Prasad Mukherjee
- Atul Tiwari as Govind Ballabh Pant
- Deepika Amin as Renuka Ray
- Shiv Kumar Subramaniam as N. Gopalaswami Ayyangar
- Rahul Singh as J. B. Kripalani
- Paresh Ganatra as K. T. Shah
- Kanupriya Shankar Pandit as Sucheta Kripalani
- Akash Khurana as Rohini Kumar Chaudhuri
- Ravi Jhankal as Seth Govind Das
- Salim Ghouse as V. I. Munuswamy Pillai
- Saurabh Dubey (actor) as Mahavir Tyagi
- Vijay Kashyap as B. Pocker
- Amit Singh Thakur as Liaquat Ali Khan
- Himani Shivpuri as Begum Aizaz Rasul
- Lalit Mohan Tiwari as Shibban Lal Saxena
- Natarajan Balkrishna as Kengal Hanumanthaiah
- Denzil Smith as the Auctioneer
- Anil Rastogi as Calcutta MP N. Ahmed
- Narendra Sachar as Abdul Ghaffar Khan

== Screening ==
The series was telecasted on Rajya Sabha TV from 2 March 2014 at 10 AM (with repeats at 1PM & 10PM) every Sunday.

== See also ==
- Pradhanmantri
- 7 RCR
- List of artistic depictions of Mahatma Gandhi
