= Yatra (1986 TV series) =

- Directed by: Shyam Benegal
- Starring: See below
- Music by: Vanraj Bhatia
- Original language: Hindi

Original release
- Network: Doordarshan
- Release: 1986

Yatra (1986) is an Indian travel-based television series. It was filmed on the Himsagar Express, the longest running train of Indian Railways. The series aired on Doordarshan, and had an ensemble cast which included Om Puri, Mohan Gokhale, Ila Arun, Neena Gupta, and Raghubir Yadav, among others. It was directed by Shyam Benegal. Music for the series was composed by Vanraj Bhatia; camera work was by Jehangir Chowdhury.

This 15-part series was shot almost entirely on the Himsagar Express and the Tripura Express.

== Cast ==
- Om Puri as Gopalan Nair
- Mohan Gokhale as a hermit
- Ila Arun – as Ila, theatre troupe member
- Neena Gupta as Neesha
- Raghubir Yadav
- Ravi Jhankal – theatre troupe member
- Himani Shivpuri
- Uttara Baokar
- Rajendra Gupta – theatre troupe member
- Harish Patel – as KD, theatre troupe member
- Urmi as Madhvi, Gopalan Nair's wife
- Irshad Hashmi as Meenakshi's father
- Kunda Rege as Meenakshi's mother
- Madhav Vatve as a hermit
- Salim Ghouse as S.Venugopalan
- Atmaram Bhende
- Lalita Kenkre
- Prem Lala
- Gajanan Bangera
- Sushma Prakash as Meenakshi
- Nikhil Bhagat as Rahul Advani
- B. M. Vyas - theatre troupe member
- Jairup Jain- theatre troupe member
- Binny Latif- theatre troupe member
- Ishita Bajpai- theatre troupe member
- K.K.Raina
- Aparajita as Dr.Parveen
- Suresh Kumar Soni
- Rupali Walia
- C.D.Sidhu
- Mohini
- Harjeet Singh
- Avtar
- Nirupama Walia
- Kavi Rattan Sharma
