= Surekha Sikri =

Indian actress (1945–2021)

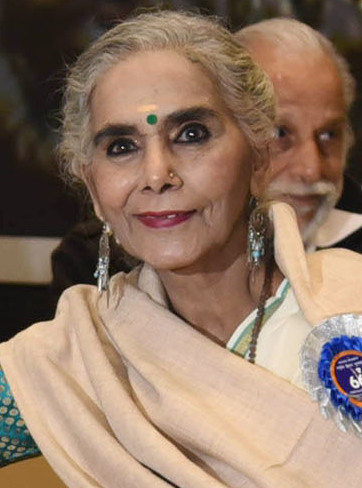
- Sikri in 2019
- Born: 19 April 1945; New Delhi, British India
- Died: 16 July 2021 (aged 76); Mumbai, Maharashtra, India
- Years active: 1977–2021
- Spouse: Hemant Rege
- Children: 1
- Awards: Full list

Surekha Sikri (pronounced [suˈɾeːkʰaː ˈsɪkɾiː]; 19 April 1945 – 16 July 2021) was an Indian actress widely known for her performance in theatre, films and television. She has received several awards, including a Filmfare Award and three National Film Awards.

A veteran of Hindi theatre, she made her debut in the 1977 political drama film Kissa Kursi Ka and went on to play supporting roles in numerous Hindi and Malayalam films, as well as in Indian soap operas.

Sikri won the National Film Award for Best Supporting Actress thrice, for her roles in Tamas (1988), Mammo (1995) and Badhaai Ho (2018). She was awarded the Indian Telly Award for Best Actress in a Negative Role in 2008 for her work in the primetime soap opera Balika Vadhu and won the Indian Telly Award for Best Actress in a Supporting Role for the same show in 2011. In addition, she won the Sangeet Natak Akademi Award in 1989 for her contributions towards Hindi theater. Her appearance in Badhaai Ho (2018) got her immense recognition and appreciation from viewers and critics. She won three awards: the National Film Award for Best Supporting Actress, Filmfare Award for Best Supporting Actress and the Screen Award for Best Supporting Actress for her performance in the film.

== Early life and background ==
Sikri belonged to Uttar Pradesh and she spent her childhood in Almora and Nainital. At the beginning of her career, she attended Aligarh Muslim University, Aligarh. Later, she graduated from the National School of Drama (NSD) in 1971, and worked with the NSD Repertory Company for over a decade before shifting base to Mumbai. Surekha Sikri was the recipient of 1989 Sangeet Natak Akademi Award.

== Personal life and death ==
Her father was in the Indian Air Force and her mother was a teacher. She was married to Hemant Rege and she has a son, Rahul Sikri, who lives in Mumbai and works as an artist. Her husband, Hemant Rege, died due to heart failure on 20 October 2009. Noted actor Naseeruddin Shah is her former brother-in-law, as his first marriage was with her step-sister Manara Sikri, also known as Parveen Murad. She is their daughter, Heeba Shah's, maternal aunt. Heeba acted as the younger version of her aunt's character, Dadisa in the television serial Balika Vadhu.

Sikri died on 16 July 2021 at the age of 76 of a cardiac arrest in Mumbai. She had been suffering from the complications of two previous brain strokes.

== Filmography ==
=== Films ===
- Kissa Kursi Ka (1977) - Meera
- Anaadi Anant (1986)
- Tamas (1988) - Rajo
- Salim Langde Pe Mat Ro (1989) - Ameena
- Parinati (1989) - Ganesh's wife
- Nazar (1990) - Bua
- Karamati Coat (1993) - Old Woman
- Little Buddha (1993) - Sonali
- Mammo (1994) - Fayyazi
- Naseem (1995)
- Sardari Begum (1996) - Idbal Bai
- Janmadinam (1998, Malayalam film) - Amma (Sarasu's mother)
- Sarfarosh (1999) - Sultan's Mother (special appearance)
- Dillagi (1999) - Kiran
- Cotton Mary (1999) - Gwen
- Hari-Bhari (2000) - Hasina
- Zubeidaa (2001) - Fayyazi
- Deham (2001) - Om's mother
- Kali Salwar (2002) - Anwari
- Mr. and Mrs. Iyer (2003) - Najma Khan
- Bokshu – The Myth (2002)
- Raghu Romeo (2003) - Mother
- Raincoat (2004) - Manoj's mom
- Tumsa Nahin Dekha (2004) - Daksh's grandma
- Jo Bole So Nihaal (2005) - Mrs. Balwant Singh (Nihaal's mom)
- Humko Deewana Kar Gaye (2006)
- Sniff (2017) - Bebe
- Badhaai Ho (2018) - Durga Devi Kaushik
- Sheer Qorma (2020)
- Ghost Stories (2020 film)
- Kya Meri Sonam Gupta Bewafa Hai? (2021) (Posthumous release, final role)

=== Television ===
- Ek Tha Raja Ek Thi Rani as Ranaji's grandmother ("Badi Rani Ma") (2015–2017)
- Pardes Mein Hai Mera Dil as Indumati Lala Mehra (Dadi) (2016–2017)
- Balika Vadhu as Kalyani Devi Dharamveer Singh/Dadisa (2008-2016)
- Maa Exchange
- Maha Kumbh: Ek Rahasaya, Ek Kahani as Rudra's grandmother (2014–2015)
- Saat Phere - Saloni Ka Safar as Bhabo (2006–2009)
- Banegi Apni Baat
- Kesar as Saroj
- Kkehna Hai Kuch Mujhko
- Saher
- Godan
- C.I.D. as Maithali (1 Episode, 2007)
- Samay
- Aahat
- Mano Ya Na Mano
- Just Mohabbat as Mrs. Pandit (1996–2000)
- Kabhie Kabhie as Lakshmi Pathak
- Sanjha Chula (1990)

== Awards and nominations ==
Sikri has won the National Film Award for Best Supporting Actress three times, more than any other actress. Her other accolades include a Filmfare award, a Screen award and six Indian Television Academy awards.
