= Hari-Bhari =

- Directed by: Shyam Benegal
- Written by: Priya Chandrasekar (Screenplay); Shama Zaidi (Screenplay & Dialogue)
- Produced by: NFDC
- Starring: Shabana Azmi; Rajit Kapur; Rajeshwari Sachdev; Nandita Das
- Cinematography: Rajan Kothari
- Edited by: Aseem Sinha
- Music by: Vanraj Bhatia
- Release date: 2000
- Running time: 134 minutes
- Country: India
- Language: Hindi

Hari-Bhari (Fertility) is a 2000 Hindi film by Shyam Benegal, starring Shabana Azmi, Rajit Kapur, Rajeshwari Sachdev, Surekha Sikri and Nandita Das.

The film revolves around the story of five women, belonging to different generations, each looking for emancipation and the right to run their lives their own way. The film's main theme is the issue of women's 'fertility rights' empowerment.

The film won the 2000 National Film Award for Best Film on Family Welfare at 47th National Film Awards.

== Plot ==
The movie tells the story of a middle aged Muslim woman Gazala (Shabana Azmi), who is ill-treated by her husband and sent back to her parents’ home, just because she is unable to give birth to a son. Gazala does have a daughter Salma (Rajeshwari Sachdev). The plot revolves around Gazala's stay at her mother's home and the problems faced by the women of the house, namely her mother and sisters-in-law. The film is a beautiful description of the problems faced by women in the name of fertility, or in a different sense the urge to have a male child, especially in rural India.

Shyam Benegal provides a masterpiece, reflecting on the sorrowful plight of rural Indian women. The irony lies in the point where the movie begins with a scene which shows a bull being brought to impregnate a buffalo. Five different women, each with a different story depicting the harsh realities of a woman's life.

== Cast ==
- Shabana Azmi as Ghazala
- Rajit Kapur as Khurshid
- Rajeshwari Sachdev as Salma
- Surekha Sikri as Hasina
- Nandita Das as Afsana
- Seema Bhargava as Rampyari
- Lalit Tiwari as Khaleej
