= Well Done Abba =

- Directed by: Shyam Benegal
- Screenplay by: Ashok Mishra
- Story by: Shyam Benegal
- Based on: Jau Tithe Khau by Abhay Kirti
- Produced by: Raj Pius; Mahesh Ramanathan
- Starring: Boman Irani; Minissha Lamba; Ravi Kishan; Sammir Dattani
- Music by: Songs: Shantanu Moitra; Promotional Song: Vishal Khurana; Background Score: Shantanu Moitra
- Release dates: August 2009 (Montréal Film Festival); 26 March 2010 (India)
- Running time: 144 minutes
- Country: India
- Language: Hindi

Well Done Abba (transl. Well done dad) is a 2009 Indian political satire Hindi film directed by Shyam Benegal, starring Boman Irani, Minissha Lamba and Sameer Dattani in pivotal roles. It is the remake of the 2007 Marathi film, Jau Tithe Khau. It was based on three short stories: Narsaiyyan Ki Bavdi by Jeelani Bano, Phulwa Ka Pul by Sanjeev and Still Waters by Jayant Kripalani. The screenplay was written by Jayant Kripalani and Ashok Mishra, who also wrote the dialogues. It won the 2009 National Film Award for Best Film on Social Issues.

== Plot ==
The film tells the story of Armaan Ali, a Muslim driver working in Mumbai, who takes a one-month leave from his employer to find a groom for his daughter Muskaan, who lives in a village near Hyderabad, India. Armaan does not turn up for three months, and his employer makes the difficult decision to sack him, but he asks his boss to listen to why he could not come. Getting soft, his employer allows him to drive to Pune where he has a meeting. Armaan starts the story from here.

In Armaan's village, many problems include a rising drought situation and financial difficulties due to the antics of his twin brother, who has a bad reputation for debt addiction and theft. In the opening, a man named Arif demands 500 rupees from Armaan. Eventually, Muskaan pays the debt to Arif and Armaan's brother is arrested and later released. To solve the drought problem, he goes to a government office to build a well, with a friend. There, he goes through stages such as explaining what he wants and even having his photo taken. Muskaan, on the other hand falls in love with Arif, of which Armaan does not approve at first but later is pleased with.

Armaan does not receive the well he wanted and sits in despair. He and Muskaan try to tell the police inspector about the well that was 'stolen', but the inspector finds the story rather silly and is even stubborn enough to not listen to what they have to say. Disturbed, Armaan and Muskaan launch a protest with several villagers against the police inspector, later on to the justice minister, where the minister punishes the inspector for his slack behaviour. The inspector, realising his mistakes and behaviour, then starts to approach the people in a more orthodox way. The justice minister then allows the government people to build the well for the villagers and punishes them all, for not doing what they are supposed to do.

With the drought problem solved, Armaan decides that Muskaan should marry an Arab sheikh. Muskaan does not accept her father's offer and even has an argument about it. The issue is even more heated when she receives a letter from her friend, Sakina, which involved her getting beat up by her sheikh husband and getting kicked out, shocking Armaan and Sakina's mother. Disturbed, Armaan then decides that Muskaan should marry Arif, much to her delight. With the two of Armaan's problems solved, he ends his story at an awards ceremony, which in his perspective was a 'big drama', as the stage literally collapsed, delighting people. With his employer convinced, he then allows Armaan to work for him again.

== Cast ==
- Boman Irani as Armaan Ali / Rehman Ali (Twin Brothers)
- Minissha Lamba as Muskaan Ali
- Rahul Singh as Rohan Kapoor (Arman Ali's boss)
- Sammir Dattani as Arif Ali
- Ravi Kishan as Sub Engineer Vikas Jha
- Ila Arun as Salma Ali
- Salim Ghouse as Janardhan Reddy
- Sonali Kulkarni as Malti Jha (Vikas Jha's wife)
- Rajit Kapur as Inspector Srikant Reddy
- Akhil Mishra as Arun Mishra - Tahsildar
- Yashpal Sharma as Constable Ramiyya
- Ravi Jhankal as Constable Rustam
- Deepika Amin as Lata (Inspector's wife)
- Rajendra Gupta as Irrigation Minister
- Anaitha Nair as Sakina
- Preeti Nigam as Sakina's mother
- Rashmi Gautam as Rashmi

== Production ==
BIG Pictures and Reliance BIG Entertainment Ltd collaborated with director Shyam Benegal to bring "a satirical comedy 'Well Done Abba' on the celluloid". The film was shot at Film City, Mumbai, the Mumbai–Pune Expressway, Ramoji Film City and Ibrahimpatnam near Hyderabad.

Vihir Chorila Geli, a Marathi film, in based on similar story starring Laxmikant Berde and Ashok Saraf.

== Soundtrack ==
Well Done Abba

Soundtrack album by Shantanu Moitra
- Released: 2010
- Genre: Feature film soundtrack
- Length: 23:51
- Language: Hindi
- Label: T-Series

Well Done Abba's music is by Shantanu Moitra and the main promotional song "Jab Bhi Muh Kholta" was composed by Vishal Khurana. The lyrics are penned by Ashok Mishra, Swanand Kirkire and Ila Arun.

Tracklist
No.	Title	Lyrics	Singer(s)	Length
1.	"Meri Banno Hoshiyar"	Ila Arun	Ila Arun & Daniel George	03:32
2.	"Hum Toh Apni Bawdi Lenge"	Ashok Mishra	Mohit Chauhan & Swanand Kirkire	03:32
3.	"Sandesa Sandesa"	Swanand Kirkire	Shreya Ghoshal & Rupankar	05:14
4.	"Rahiman Ishq Ka Dhaga Re"	Ashok Mishra	Raghav & Raja Hasan	05:59
5.	"Pani Ko Taraste"	Ashok Mishra	Krishna Beura & Raja Hasan	05:34
Total length:				23:51

Promotional Song
No.	Title	Lyrics	Music	Singer(s)	Length
1.	"Jab Bhi Muh Kholta"	Ashok Mishra	Vishal Khurana	Ila Arun & Boman Irani

== Critical reception ==
The film received favourable reviews from top critics in India. Anupama Chopra of NDTV writes, "The end result is that Well Done Abba is heart-felt and intermittently funny." Nikhat Khazmi of the Times of India writes "The film is a sheer delight, with the events unfolding in a breezy, comic vein which keeps the ribs relentlessly tickling". Vinayak Chakravorty of Mail Today gave it three stars.
