= The Making of the Mahatma =

1996 film by Shyam Benegal

- Poster
- Directed by: Shyam Benegal
- Written by: Fatima Meer
- Starring: Rajit Kapur; Pallavi Joshi
- Cinematography: Ashok Mehta
- Edited by: Avril Beukes (S.A.G.E.)
- Music by: Vanraj Bhatia
- Release date: 1996
- Running time: 144 minutes
- Countries: India; South Africa
- Language: English

The Making of the Mahatma is a 1996 biographical film directed by Shyam Benegal, about the early life of Mohandas Karamchand Gandhi (also known as Mahatma Gandhi) during his 21 years in South Africa. The film is based upon the book The Apprenticeship of a Mahatma by Fatima Meer, and was an international co-production between India and South Africa.

== Cast ==
- Rajit Kapoor as barrister Mohandas Karamchand Gandhi
- Pallavi Joshi as Kasturba Gandhi
- Paul Slabolepszy as Jan Smuts
- Sean Cameron Michael as Warder
- Charles Pillai as Thambi Naidoo
- Keith Stevenson as Rustomjee (also in Akayla)
- Lieb Bester as Boer coach leader
- Peter J. Elliott as Jail superintendent, Pretoria

== Awards ==
- 1996: National Film Award for Best Actor – Rajit Kapur as Gandhi
- 1996: National Film Award for Best Feature Film in English

== See also ==
- List of artistic depictions of Mahatma Gandhi
