= Welcome to Sajjanpur =

- Movie Poster for Welcome to Sajjanpur
- Directed by: Shyam Benegal
- Written by: Ashok Mishra
- Story by: Shyam Benegal
- Based on: Palkon Ki Chhaon Mein by Meraj
- Produced by: Ronnie Screwvala
- Starring: Shreyas Talpade; Amrita Rao; Kunal Kapoor; Ravi Kishan; Ravi Jhankal
- Cinematography: Rajan Kothari
- Edited by: Aseem Sinha
- Music by: Shantanu Moitra
- Production companies: UTV Spotboy; Bindass
- Distributed by: UTV Motion Pictures
- Release date: 19 September 2008
- Running time: 134 mins
- Country: India
- Language: Hindi

Welcome to Sajjanpur is a 2008 Indian Hindi-language comedy film directed by Shyam Benegal, starring Shreyas Talpade and Amrita Rao. The film is inspired by the 1977 film Palkon Ki Chhaon Mein.

== Plot ==
Mahadev is an unemployed graduate with a Bachelor of Arts from Satna College who lives with his mother and is forced to make a living writing letters for the uneducated people of his village. His real ambition is to become a novel writer. Through his humble occupation, Mahadev has the potential to impact numerous lives in this satirical but warm-hearted portrait of life in rural India. He realizes this passion when an aunt of his wants him to write a letter to her son, who has treated his mother with disrespect, and the letter seemed to have worked. This made her aunt tell the villagers what an amazing writer he truly was. Initially the village folk would come to his home to get their letters written, but his mother did not approve of it, so he decided to set up a small work space near the post office.

Among Mahadev's customers are:

- Mahadev's childhood crush and second grade classmate Kamla, who eventually became a school dropout because of her seizures, is desperate for communication from her husband Bansi Ram, who works as a labourer at a dockyard in Mumbai. In the letters to her husband, a jealous Mahadev writes the opposite of the loving messages Kamla wants to convey while faking what her husband has written to her.
- A hurried mother who wants to get her ill-starred daughter, Vindhya, married.
- A landlord whose wife is a candidate for the village of Sarpanch and who wants all her political rivals eliminated from the race.
- A transgender woman, Munni, who is contesting the elections for the village of Sarpanch but fears the threats from the landlord.
- A lovelorn compounder, Ram Kumar, who is crazy about the widowed daughter-in-law, Shobha Rani, of a retired army soldier.

Mahadev manages to get his friend engaged, police protection for Munni, and almost kisses Kamla before they are interrupted. However, Munni is killed after winning the election by the opposition, and he learns a shocking truth about Kamla's husband, who used to sell his blood so he could earn a reasonable amount of money. It soon turns out that the story was a fictional novel written by the real Mahadev, but it is mostly based on his own experiences. Though it turns out that some of the villagers didn't exactly have happy endings, Mahadev sorts out his mistakes and accomplishes his long-held dream of writing a novel.

Mahadev, under the pseudonym Sukhdev, reveals that Munnibai became a successful politician, becoming an MLA, or Member of the State Legislature, with high connections and powerful people surrounding her. It is also revealed that Kamla and Bansi are happy in a small house in Mumbai and come to visit Sajjanpur every Diwali. Amid all this good news, Mahadev notes that Ram Kumar and Shobha Rani were lynched because members of their community opposed a widow getting remarried. Mahadev also notes that he married the ill-starred Vindhya after wooing her by writing 40 letters. While most people consider an ill-starred person to be a great misfortune, Mahadev notes that he became successful due to his marriage, as he paid down his farmland mortgage, built a wonderful house, and realised his dream of writing a novel.

== Cast ==
- Shreyas Talpade as Mahadev Kushwaha
- Amrita Rao as Kamla Kumbharan, clay pot maker
- Kunal Kapoor as Bansi Ram
- Ravi Kishan as Ram Kumar
- Ravi Jhankal as Munnibai Mukhanni
- Yashpal Sharma as Ramsingh
- Rajeshwari Sachdev as Shobha Rani, Ramkumar's love interest
- Divya Dutta as Vindhya
- Ila Arun as Ramsakhi Pannawali
- Lalit Mohan Tiwari as Subedar Singh, father-in law of Shobha Rani
- Rajit Kapur as Collector
- Mangala Kenkare as Mahadev's mother
- Vineeta Malik (Kamla's mother-in-law)
- Daya Shankar Pandey as Chidamiram Naga Sapera
- Sri Vallabh Vyas as Ramavtar Tyagi, school teacher of Mahadev and Kamla
- Preeti Nigam as Jamuna Bai
- Keshav Deepak as Theatre actor
- Yousuf Ahmed as Salim Mohammed a Pakistani spy isi agent

== Soundtrack ==
The music was released on 5 September 2008.

All music is composed by Shantanu Moitra.

No.	Title	Lyrics	Singer(s)	Length
1.	"Sita Ram Sita Ram"	Ashok Mishra	KK	3:50
2.	"Ek Meetha Marz De Ke"	Swanand Kirkire	Madhushree, Mohit Chauhan	4:56
3.	"Bheeni Bheeni Mehki Mehki"	Swanand Kirkire	KK, Shreya Ghoshal	3:35
4.	"Dildara"	Ashok Mishra	Sunidhi Chauhan, Sonu Nigam	5:17
5.	"Aadmi Azaad Hai"	Ashok Mishra	Kailash Kher	4:28
6.	"Munni Ki Baari"	Ashok Mishra	Ajay Jhingran	3:23
7.	"Sita Ram Sita Ram (Remix)"	Ashok Mishra	KK	4:24

== Reception ==
Upon its release, the film received positive reviews and became a sleeper hit at the box office. An Indiatimes review said, "Shyam Benegal has always been accredited as a mesmerizing storyteller known for making 'meaningful' cinema. This time he also caters to commercial consumers, coming up with his most 'entertaining' attempt, by far."

Khalid Mohamed of Hindustan Times gave the film a 3 out of 5 stars, and stated "Sajjanpur is different, it has a conscience, and merits a ticket from those who have one too". Times of India gave the film 3 out of 5 stars and stated, "It's simple, uncomplicated storytelling leaves a smile on your face". The Economic Times stated, "Shyam Benegal has always been accredited as a mesmerizing storyteller known for making 'meaningful' cinema. This time he also caters to commercial consumers, coming up with his most 'entertaining' attempt, by far".

== Awards and nominations ==
- Amrita Rao – Winner, Stardust Best Actress Award
- Ashok Mishra – Winner, Mirchi Music Award for Upcoming Lyricist of The Year
