= Mammo =

- Poster
- Directed by: Shyam Benegal
- Written by: Khalid Mohammed; Shama Zaidi; Javed Siddiqui
- Produced by: National Film Development Corporation of India
- Starring: Farida Jalal; Rajit Kapoor; Surekha Sikri
- Cinematography: Shyam Benegal
- Edited by: Shyam Benegal
- Music by: Vanraj Bhatia
- Distributed by: NFDC
- Release date: 8 June 1994
- Running time: 130 minutes
- Country: India
- Language: Hindi

Mammo is a 1994 Indian Hindi-language film by Shyam Benegal. It stars Farida Jalal, Surekha Sikri, Amit Phalke and Rajit Kapur.

The film won the National Film Award for Best Feature Film in Hindi in 1995. Farida Jalal won Filmfare Critics Award for Best Performance, while Surekha Sikri won the National Film Award for Best Supporting Actress. It was the first film of Benegal’s Muslim trilogy, which included Sardari Begum (1996) and Zubeidaa (2001). The film was critically acclaimed and is regarded among his best works. The film’s writer, Khalid Muhammad, mentioned that he wrote the role for Waheeda Rehman who was hesitant to do the role, thus casting Farida Jalal.

== Plot ==
13-year-old Riyaz lives a poor lifestyle in Bombay, India, with his grandmother, Fayyuzi, and her sister, Mehmooda Begum, nicknamed Mammo. Quite outspoken and embittered over his dad abandoning him, Riyaz does not have many friends, save Rohan. When Mammo plans a surprise birthday party for him, Riyaz is offended as he believes his friends will make fun of him as his lifestyle is not as good as theirs. Fayyuzi and Riyaz have an argument with Mammo, and she leaves for the mosque at Haji Ali; she returns when they apologize. Although Mammo was born in Panipat during the British Raj, she was one of thousands of Muslims who left for Pakistan after Partition. She and her husband automatically became Pakistani citizens. Although childless, her marriage is a happy one until her husband's death. Over property matters, Mammo is thrown out of the house by her relatives.

Having nowhere else to go, she came to live with her widowed sister in Bombay on a temporary visa. Every month she walks to the nearest police station to get an extension. She finally paid Rs.4800 as a bribe to get a permanent visa through Inspector Apte. When Apte was transferred, a new police inspector took over, processed her papers, took her to be an illegal immigrant, arrested her, had her escorted to the Bombay Central railway station and forced her to board the Frontier Mail, which would return her to Pakistan. Riyaz and Fayyuzi make every possible attempt to trace and bring her back, all in vain. Now 20 years later, Riyaz has grown up and has written a book about his Mammo, hoping that someday, somewhere she will find it and they will be reunited.

The movie touches upon several emotional aspects of day-to-day life. Unable to extend her visa, she is deported back to Pakistan. Political priorities defeat humanitarian ones. The director shows a happy ending where Mammo comes to Riyaz and her sister at the end. She pretends that she is dead so that she can continue to stay in India thereafter.

== Cast ==
- Farida Jalal as Mammo
- Surekha Sikri as Fayyazi
- Amit Phalke as Riyaz (Young)
- Rajit Kapoor as Riyaz (Adult)
- Lalit Tiwari as Riyaz's father
- Himani Shivpuri as Anwari, Mammo's sister
- Shrivallabh Vyas as Sabir
- Sandeep Kulkarni as Inspector Apte
- Rupal Patel as Lady Constable

== Soundtrack ==
The music soundtrack to Mammo was composed by Vanraj Bhatia and the lyrics were written by Gulzar and the song was sung by Jagjit Singh.

Track listing
No.	Title	Singer(s)	Length
1.	"Yeh Faasle Teri Galiyon Ke Humse Taye Na Huye"	Jagjit Singh	5:58

== Reception ==
Reviewing the film at the International Film Festival of India, S. R. Ashok Kumar of The Hindu wrote that "This emotional film is one of the best of director Shyam Benegal. Farida Jalal, Surekha Sikri, Amit Phalke, Himani Shivpuri have come out with sterling performances. Music by Vanraj Bhatia adds life to the film".

== Accolades ==
Year	Award	Category	Recipient(s)	Result	Ref.
1996	Bengal Film Journalists' Association Awards	Best Actress (Hindi)	Farida Jalal	Won	
1995	Filmfare Awards	Best Actress (Critics)	Farida Jalal	Won	
1995	National Film Awards	Best Feature Film in Hindi	Shyam Benegal, NFDC and Doordarshan	Won	
1995	National Film Awards	Best Supporting Actress	Surekha Sikri	Won	
