= Sardari Begum =

- DVD cover
- Directed by: Shyam Benegal
- Written by: Khalid Mohammed (Story & Screenplay); Shama Zaidi (Dialogues & ad. Screenplay)
- Produced by: Amit Khanna; Mahesh Bhatt
- Starring: Kiron Kher; Surekha Sikri; Amrish Puri; Rajit Kapur
- Music by: Vanraj Bhatia
- Release date: 23 May 1996
- Running time: 135 min
- Country: India
- Languages: Urdu; Hindi

Sardari Begum is a 1996 Indian musical film directed by Shyam Benegal. The film stars Kiron Kher, Amrish Puri, Rajit Kapur and Rajeshwari Sachdev.

The film's lead actress Kiron Kher won the 1997 National Film Award - Special Jury Award. Rajeshwari Sachdev won the 1997 National Film Award for Best Supporting Actress.

This film focuses on the complex portrait of family relationships, generational and sexual politics as well as social mores in India.

== Plot ==
The police are called to investigate the death of a woman during a riot in the walled city of Delhi. She was killed by a stone thrown by an agitated mob. The deceased woman is known in the community as "Sardari Begum", a popular singer and courtesan(tawaif). The religious nature of the incident and the impending elections combine to attract the media's attention. When a young reporter covering the funeral, Tehzeeb Abbasi, discovers her father among the mourners, her curiosity prompts her to investigate further. Then comes the revelation that the singer was in fact her aunt, who was disowned by her family for rebelliously learning music from a courtesan.

The reporter Tehzeeb finds the life of her aunt intriguing and exciting, having an opinion that is totally opposite to her father Jabbar. the brother of the late Sardari Begum. Although he loved and cared for her, he didn't support her ideals, her freedom, her passion for singing. At Tehzeeb's residence, Jabbar tells his daughter about the stubbornness of his elder sister yet also confessing his love for her as she was his only sister. The film goes into flashback where Sardari refuses to take money back she had given to Jabbar for Tehzeeb's education. Jabbar wants to return the money as he thinks it was a debt while Sardari regards it as a gift for Tehzeeb. The argument ends with Jabbar leaving Sardari's home swearing never to come back again.

He also narrates how the younger Sardari turned rebellious in order to pursue her passion for singing when it was not approved by her father. Having Inspired by her story, Tehzeeb decides to dig deeper in her late aunt's life. She decides to write a long article in her memory in the newspaper she works but her editor doesn't not approve. It is revealed that Tehzeeb is in a relationship with her editor boss who is happily married with two kids. Tehzeeb continues her journey interviewing every person who was related to her aunt or knew her closely. However, Sardari's daughter Sakheena does not oblige Tehzeeb's request and ignores her.

Tehzeeb finds out about the fateful night when Sardari ran away from home in Agra. She went to Ittan Bai, who refuses to give her shelter and asks her to go home. Sardari then makes her way at Hemraj's (Amrish Puri) house. Hemraj is a Zamindar who leads a colorful life. Although he is married, he keeps attending gatherings led by courtesans (primarily at Ittan Bai where Sardari used to perform. Hemraj felt attracted towards Sardari which is why Sardari approach him and asks for shelter. Hemraj takes Sardari in his house and holds gatherings for her so she can continue her singing. Hemraj's wife dislikes her totally and does not like her closeness with her husband. Meanwhile, Fateh Khan who plays sitar and other musical instruments at Ittan Bai's court was highly impressed with Sardari's talent. After he leaves Ittan Bai, he continues to support Sardari Begum in her future concerts at Hemraj's house and later in Delhi.

Meanwhile, Sadiq Moosvi a friend of Hemraj and a regular attendee at his gatherings is immensely attracted to Sardari. Initially, Sardari does not react to his feelings but slowly when she realizes that Hemraj only lusts for her and does not respect her singing talent, also not want her to grow as an artist, she starts to fall for Sadiq. Sadiq convinces Sardari to come with him to Delhi so that her voice can be popular and she would become famous. Sadiq also learns that Sardari is pregnant with Hemraj's child however he has no obligations to accept both. Sardari and Sadiq comes to Delhi and marry in a private ceremony. Sadiq takes Sardari to a record label company where the company's director Mr Sen falls for Sardari's voice and gets mesmerized by her charm and beauty. From there, Sardari becomes immensely popular as a 'thumri' artist singer known for her passionate voice and singing. For eight years, she reigns supreme and at the top of her game. Meanwhile, she gives birth to her daughter Sakeena.

After few years, differences start to crop up between Sardari and Sadiq. While Sardari slowly loses interest in regular singing and recordings. Sadiq uses her money for his own purposes. One day, when one of Sardari's recording gets cancelled, Mr Sen feels disappointed at Sardari's unprofessionalism. Sadiq tries to reason with him and invites him to his home to have a talk with his wife. At home, Sardari and Sadiq gets into a major argument and Sardari throws Sadiq out of the house. She feels cheated by her husband as he exploited her talent, passion and money for his own investments and purposes and was never cared for her otherwise. Mr Sen who comes to the house witnessing the drama and feels sorry for Sadiq. However, he felt Sadiq was never the right person for Sardari.

Mr Sen was also in love with Sardari, At one visit he asks her to sing some ghazals and ultimately proposes her for marriage. Sardari considers Mr Sen a nice man but she does not feel eligible to remarry. She also feels that her passion for music is above all and she can't sacrifice it for anything. Mr Sen accepts all her conditions but gets reluctant to accept Sakina as his own daughter. Sardari rejects the proposal as she can't be detached with her daughter. Mr Sen later repents for not accepting Sakina. At the same time, Sardari Begum's popularity goes down as a singer and she stops performing for record labels and singing functions. The situation comes to a point where Sardari has to make money through arranging marriages of unknown couples to run her household.

Tehzeeb finally approaches Sakeena for her interview but she rejects her request. On seeing her dejected, Tehzeeb narrates her story. She tells Sakeena that she and her father are no longer on talking terms. She is in love with a married man and her father will never accept him. Also he refuses to believe that he would sacrifice his married life for her. Moved by this, Sakeena narrates her part. She tells that Sardari Begum was not the woman which people knew. For them she was an artist, a glorious artist, the famous thumri singer but as the real Sardari she was limited as a woman. She never allowed Sakeena to pursue education, or chat with men. She was not allowed to call 'Sardari' as Amma (mom) as it would hide her age. Sakeena calls her Appa'Bi (elder sister). Sardari forced her talent and musical knowledge in establishing Sakeena as the next Sardari which clearly Sakeena was not meant to be. No one ever bothered about Sakeena's hopes and ambitions.

Sakeena narrates an incident where Tehzeeb's father visits them and storms out of the house after an argument with Sardari. Enraged by this, Sakeena calls out 'Sardari' as an arrogant and selfish woman. After the incident, Sakeena stops talking to her and even stops her singing. Now the film comes to the present where Sardari is practicing her singing when she hears a ruckus and goes out to witness and suddenly a stone thrown from the agitated mob hits her hard. Sardari calls out Sakeena who is devastated to see her mother dying. Sardari asks Sakeena if she was a good mother to her to which Sakeena replies positively. Sardari then asks Sakeena to sing one last time for her to which Sakeena obliges. Sardari then dies.

Inspired by her aunt's story, Tehzeeb sends the article to a different newspaper for publishing which she reports to her lover editor. She also breaks ties with him and re-unites with her father. At the end, Sardari's daughter Sakeena is seen practicing singing thus signifying that she would continue to live with mother's legacy as a great singer.

== Cast ==
- Kirron Kher - Sardari Begum
- Smriti Mishra - Young Sardari Begum
- Amrish Puri - Hemraj
- Surekha Sikri - Ittan Bai
- Rajit Kapur - Sadiq Moosvi
- Rajeshwari Sachdev - Sakina
- S.M. Zaheer - Fateh Khan
- Rajina Raj Bisaria - Tehzeeb
- Uttara Baokar - Hemraj's wife
- Kumud Mishra - Amode Bajaj
- Shri Vallabh Vyas - Jabbar Abbasi
- Javed Khan - Maulvi
- Ravi Jhankal - Police Inspector
- Salim Ghouse - Mr. Sen

== Music ==
Penned by Javed Akhtar, the songs of the film are composed by Vanraj Bhatia and Ashok Patki.

| No. | Title | Singer(s) | Length |
|---|---|---|---|
| 1. | "Chahe Maar Dalo Raja" | Asha Bhosle | 02:51 |
| 2. | "Raah Mein Bichhi Hai Palke" | Arati Ankalikar-Tikekar, Shubha Joshi | 04:50 |
| 3. | "More Kanha Jo Aaye" | Asha Bhosle | 03:29 |
| 4. | "Ghar Naahi Hamre Shyam" | Arati Ankalikar-Tikekar | 04:14 |
| 5. | "Ghir Ghir Aayee Badariya Kaari" | Arati Ankalikar-Tikekar | 03:18 |
| 6. | "More Kanha Jo Aaye" | Arati Ankalikar-Tikekar | 03:20 |
| 7. | "Saawariya Dekh Zara" | Shubha Joshi | 05:30 |
| 8. | "Chali Pee Ke Nagar" | Arati Ankalikar-Tikekar, Poorva Joshi | 05:32 |
| 9. | "Raah Mein Bichhi Hai Palke" | Arati Ankalikar-Tikekar, Shubha Joshi | 04:35 |
| 10. | "Huzoor Itna Agar Hum Par" | Arati Ankalikar-Tikekar | 04:31 |

== Awards ==
The film won 3 awards at the 44th National Film Awards which were presented in July 1997.

National Film Awards

- 1997: National Film Award - Best Supporting Actress: Rajeshwari Sachdev

Citation: For her role in the film, in which she depicts the aspirations and agony of a lonely teenage girl.

- 1997: Best Feature Film in Urdu: Producers: Amit Khanna and Mahesh Bhatt, Director: Shyam Benegal

Citation: For excellent recreation of an era and showing dedication of an artist to music that defies all orthodox and conservative values.

- 1997: Special Jury Award: Kirron Kher

Citation: For superb depiction of a dynamic person who breaks shackles of society and achieves excellence in her chosen profession.

Others

- 1997: 20th Moscow International Film Festival: Golden St. George: Shyam Benegal: Nominated
