= Shyam Benegal =

Indian director and screenwriter (1934–2024)

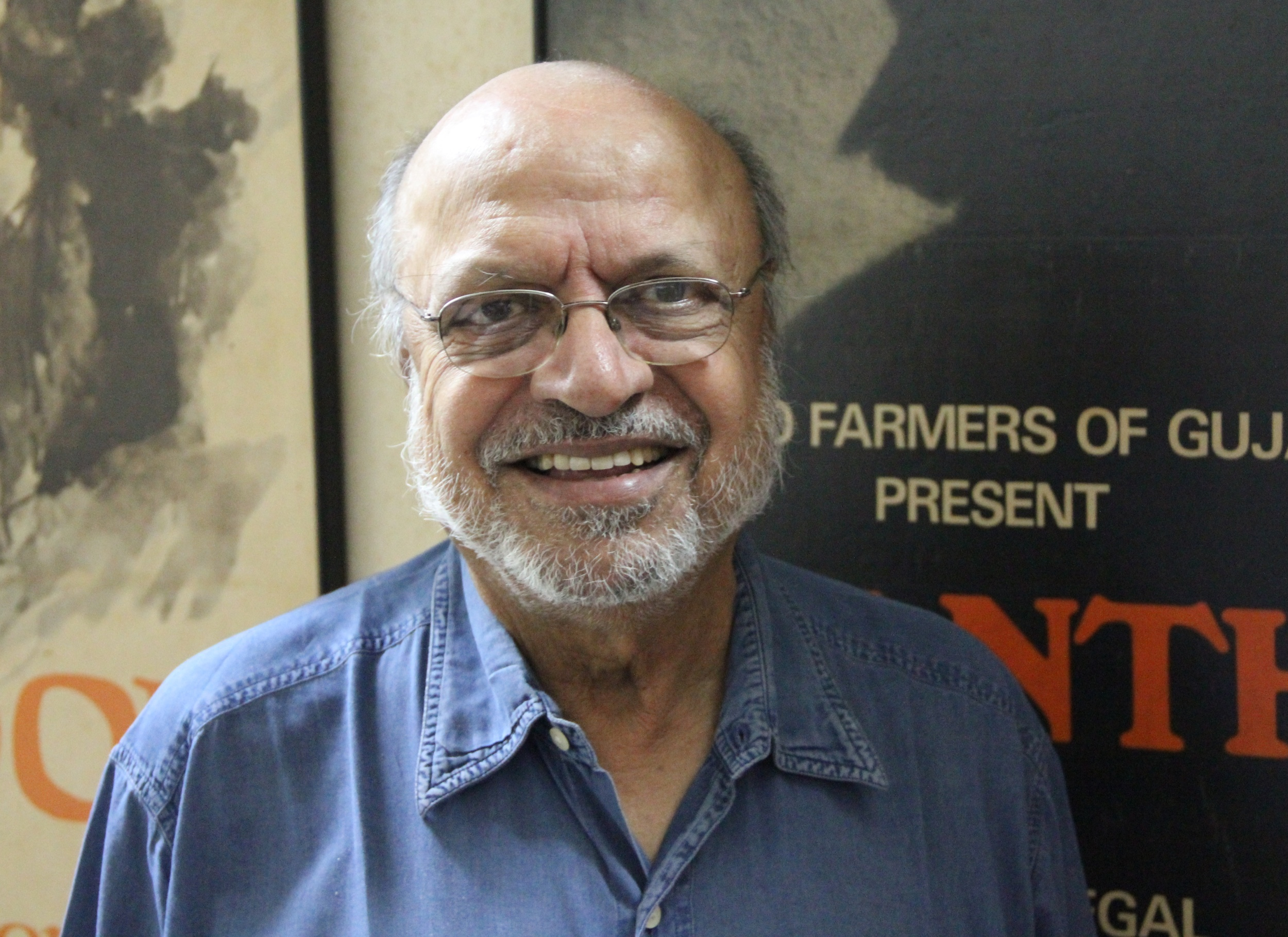
- Benegal in 2010
- Born: 14 December 1934; Tirumalagiri, Hyderabad State, British India (now in Telangana, India)
- Died: 23 December 2024 (aged 90); Mumbai, Maharashtra, India
- Occupations: Film director, screenwriter
- Works: Full list
- Spouse: Nira Benegal
- Children: 1
- Relatives: Guru Dutt (cousin)
- Awards: 1976 Padma Shri; 1991 Padma Bhushan; 2005 Dadasaheb Phalke Award; 2013 ANR National Award

Member of Parliament, Rajya Sabha
- In office 16 February 2006 – 15 February 2012

Shyam Benegal (14 December 1934 – 23 December 2024) was an Indian film director, screenwriter and documentary filmmaker. Often regarded as a pioneer of parallel cinema, he is considered as one of the greatest filmmakers post 1970s. He has received several accolades, including eighteen National Film Awards, a Filmfare Award and a Nandi Award. In 2005, he was honoured with the Dadasaheb Phalke Award, India's highest award in the field of cinema. In 1976, he was honoured by the Government of India with the Padma Shri, the fourth-highest civilian honour of the country, and in 1991, he was awarded the Padma Bhushan, the third-highest civilian honour for his contributions in the field of arts. He died on 23 December 2024, aged 90, at Wockhardt Hospital in Mumbai, where he was receiving treatment for chronic kidney disease.

Benegal was born in Hyderabad to Sridhar B. Benegal, who was prominent in the field of photography. Starting his career as a copywriter, he made his first Documentary film in Gujarati, Gher Betha Ganga (Ganges at the Doorstep) in 1962. Benegal's first four feature films – Ankur (1973), Nishant (1975), Manthan (1976) and Bhumika (1977) – made him a pioneer of the new wave film movement of that period. Benegal's "Muslim Women Trilogy" films Mammo (1994), Sardari Begum (1996), and Zubeidaa (2001) all won National Film Awards for Best Feature Film in Hindi. Benegal has won the National Film Award for Best Feature Film in Hindi seven times. He was awarded the V. Shantaram Lifetime Achievement Award in 2018.

== Early life and education ==
Shyam Benegal was born on 14 December 1934 in a Konkani-speaking Hindu family in Hyderabad, as Shyam Sunder Benegal. His father hailed from Karnataka. In an interview, he has described his father as agnostic, and was himself non-religious even though he would respect faith. When he was twelve years old, he made his first film, on a camera given to him by his photographer father Sridhar B. Benegal. He received an M.A. in Economics from Osmania University, Hyderabad. There he established the Hyderabad Film Society.

Film director and actor Guru Dutt's maternal grandmother and Shyam's paternal grandmother were sisters, thus making Dutt and Shyam second cousins.

Shyam Benegal married Nira Benegal. They have a daughter, Pia Benegal, a costume designer.

Shyam's brother, Som, died in 2014, and his nephews, Dev and Rahul, have also pursued careers in filmmaking.

== Career ==
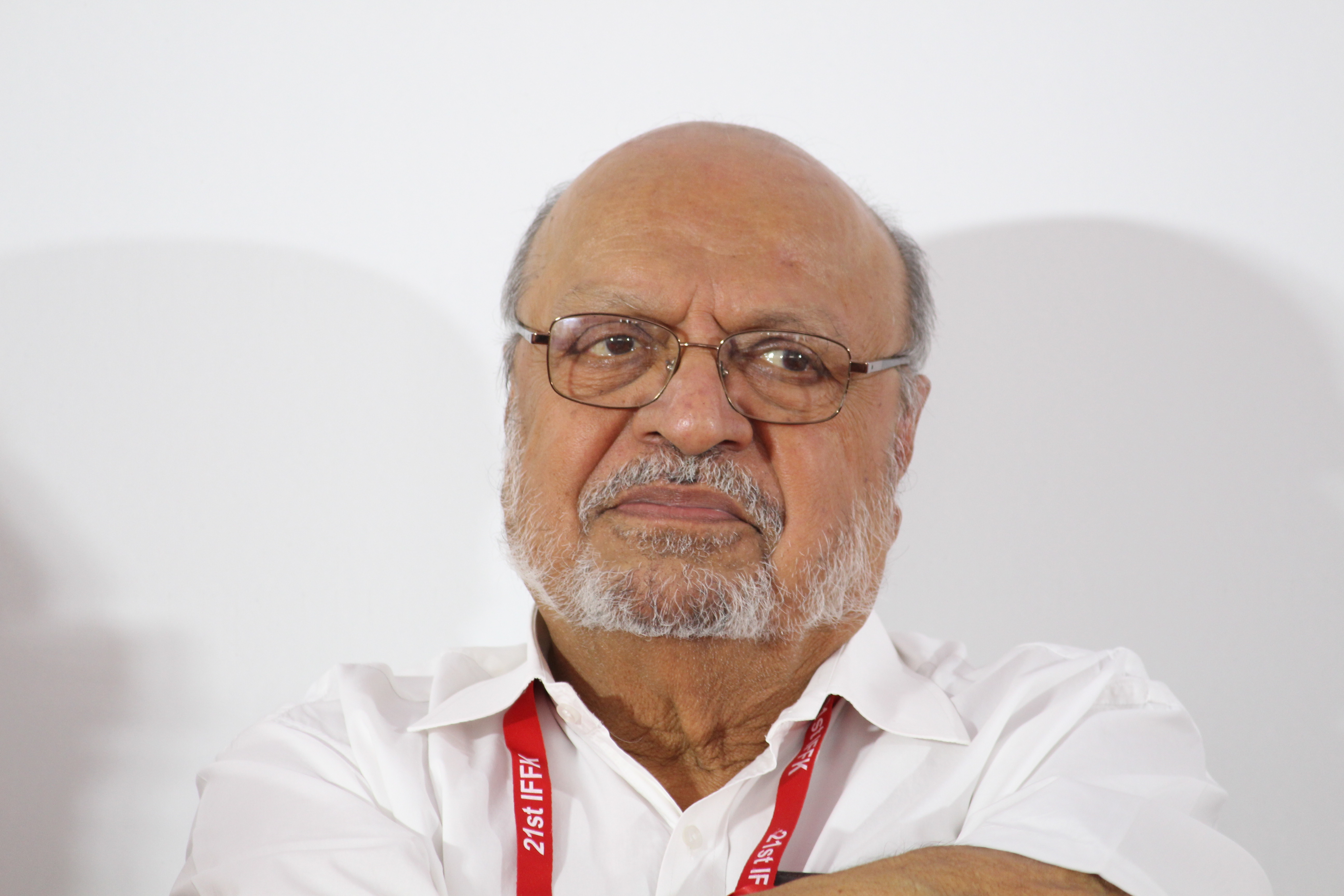
Shyam Benegal at the International Film Festival of Kerala, 2016

=== Early career ===
In 1959, he started working as a copywriter at a Mumbai-based advertising agency, Lintas Advertising, where he steadily rose to become the creative head. Meanwhile, Benegal made his first documentary in Gujarati, Gher Betha Ganga (Ganges at the Doorstep) in 1962. He worked on the script for another decade before producing his first feature film.

In 1963 he had a brief stint with another advertising agency called ASP (Advertising, Sales and Promotion). During his advertising years, he directed over 900 sponsored documentaries and advertising films.

Between 1966 and 1973, Shyam taught at the Film and Television Institute of India (FTII), Pune, and twice served as the institute's chairman: 1980–83 and 1989–92. By this time he had already started making documentaries. One of his early documentaries A Child of the Streets (1967), garnered him wide acclaim. In all, he has made over 70 documentary and short films.

He was awarded the Homi J. Bhabha Fellowship (1970–72) which allowed him to work at the Children's Television Workshop, New York, and later at Boston's WGBH-TV.

=== Feature films ===
After returning to Mumbai, he received independent financing and Ankur (The Seedling) was finally made in 1973. It was a realistic drama of economic and sexual exploitation in his home state, Telangana, and Benegal became famous for it. The film introduced actors Shabana Azmi and Anant Nag and Benegal won the 1975 National Film Award for Second Best Feature Film. Shabana won the National Film Award for Best Actress.

The success that New India Cinema enjoyed in the 1970s and early 1980s could largely be attributed to Shyam Benegal's quartet: Ankur (1973), Nishant (1975), Manthan (1976) and Bhumika (1977). Benegal used a variety of new actors, mainly from the FTII and NSD, such as Naseeruddin Shah, Om Puri, Smita Patil, Shabana Azmi, Kulbhushan Kharbanda and Amrish Puri.

In Benegal produced Nishant (Night's End) in 1975, and Manthan (The Churning) in 1976. For the first time, over five lakh (half a million) rural farmers in Gujarat contributed ₹ 2 each and thus became the film's producers. Upon its release, truckloads of farmers came to see "their" film, making it a success at the box office. After this trilogy on rural oppression, Benegal made a biopic Bhumika (The Role) (1977), broadly based on the life of well-known Marathi stage and film actress of the 1940s, Hansa Wadkar (played by Smita Patil), who led a flamboyant and unconventional life.

In the early 1970s, Shyam made 21 film modules for Satellite Instructional Television Experiment (SITE), sponsored by UNICEF. This allowed him to interact with children of SITE and many folk artists. Eventually many of these children starred in his feature length rendition of the classic folk tale Charandas Chor (Charandas the Thief) in 1975. He made it for the Children's Film Society, India. To quote film critic Derek Malcolm:

What Benegal has done is to paint a magnificent visual recreation of those extraordinary days and one that is also sensitive to the agonies and predicament of a talented woman whose need for security was only matched by her insistence on freedom.

=== The 1980s ===
Unlike most New Cinema filmmakers, Benegal had private backers for many of his films and institutional backing for a few, including Manthan (Gujarat Cooperative Milk Marketing Federation) and Susman (1987) (Handloom Co-operatives). However, his films did not have proper releases. He turned to TV where he directed serials such as Yatra (1986), for the Indian Railways, and one of the biggest projects undertaken on Indian television, the 53-episode television serial Bharat Ek Khoj (1988) based on Jawaharlal Nehru's book, Discovery of India. This allowed him to survive the collapse of the New Cinema movement in the late 1980s due to paucity of funding, which led to many neo-realist filmmakers leaving. Benegal continued making films throughout the next two decades. He also served as the Director of the National Film Development Corporation (NFDC) from 1980 to 1986.

Following the success of these four films, Benegal was backed by star Shashi Kapoor, for whom he made Junoon (1978) and Kalyug (1981). The former was an interracial love story set amidst the turbulent period of the Indian Rebellion of 1857, while the latter was based on the Mahabharata and was not a big hit, although both won Filmfare Best Movie Awards in 1980 and 1982, respectively.

Benegal's next film Mandi (1983), was a satirical comedy about politics and prostitution, starring Shabana Azmi and Smita Patil. Later, working from his own story, based on the last days of Portuguese in Goa, in the early 1960s, Shyam released Trikal (1985).

Soon, Shyam Benegal stepped beyond traditional narrative films and took to biographical material to achieve greater freedom of expression. His first venture in this genre was with a documentary film based on Satyajit Ray's life, Satyajit Ray, in 1985. This was followed by works such as Sardari Begum (1996) and Zubeidaa, which was written by filmmaker and critic Khalid Mohamed.

In 1985 he was a member of the jury at the 14th Moscow International Film Festival.

=== The 1990s and beyond ===
The 1990s saw Shyam Benegal making a trilogy on Indian Muslim women, starting with Mammo (1994), Sardari Begum (1996) and Zubeidaa (2001). With Zubeidaa, he entered mainstream Bollywood, as it starred top Bollywood star Karishma Kapoor and boasted music by A. R. Rahman.

In 1992, he made Suraj Ka Satvan Ghoda (Seventh Horse of the Sun), based on a novel by Dharmavir Bharati, which won the 1993 National Film Award for Best Feature Film in Hindi. In 1996 he made another film based on the book The Making of the Mahatma, based on Fatima Meer's, The Apprenticeship of a Mahatma. This turn to biographical material resulted in Netaji Subhas Chandra Bose: The Forgotten Hero, his 2005 English language film. He criticised the Indian caste system in Samar (1999), which went on to win the National Film Award for Best Feature Film.

Benegal served as a president of the president of the Federation of Film Societies of India. He was the owner of a production company called Sahyadri Films.

He was the author of three books based on his own films: The Churning with Vijay Tendulkar (1984), which was based on Manthan; Satyajit Ray (1988), based on his biographical cinema, Satyajit Ray; and The Marketplace (1989), based on Mandi.

In 2009 he was a member of the jury at the 31st Moscow International Film Festival.

=== Later projects ===
In 2008, his film Welcome to Sajjanpur, starring Shreyas Talpade and Amrita Rao, was released to a good response. Its music was composed by Shantanu Moitra, and it was produced by Chetan Motiwalla. Shyam Benegal is slated to direct an epic musical, Chamki Chameli, inspired by Georges Bizet's classic Spanish opera Carmen. The story revolves around the eponymous Chamki, a beautiful gypsy girl with a fiery temper and is written by Shama Zaidi. The music is by A. R. Rahman and lyrics are by Javed Akhtar.

In March 2010, Benegal released the political satire Well Done Abba.

One of Benegal's last projects was a film based on the life of Noor Inayat Khan, daughter of Inayat Khan and descendant of Tipu Sultan, who served as a British spy during World War II.

Benegal made a comeback on the small screen with Samvidhaan, a 10-part mini-series revolving around the making of the Indian Constitution, to be aired on Rajya Sabha TV from 2 March 2014.

Government of Bangladesh has confirmed Benegal would direct the biopic of Sheikh Mujibur Rahman named Mujib: The Making of a Nation. The film was released in 2023.

== Personal life and death ==
Shyam Benegal was married to Nira Benegal and had a daughter, Pia Benegal, a costume designer, who worked for many films.

Benegal died of kidney disease at Wockhardt Hospital Mumbai Central, on 23 December 2024, at the age of 90.

Following the passing of acclaimed filmmaker Shyam Benegal in December 2024, the National Indian Film Festival of Australia (NIFFA) 2025 honoured his legacy with a special retrospective. The tribute featured landmark works including Mammo, Mujib: The Making of a Nation, Suraj Ka Satvan Ghoda, and The Making of the Mahatma, celebrating his profound contributions to Indian and global cinema.

== Awards and nominations ==
Year	Award Ceremony	Film	Award	References
1975	20th National Film Awards	Ankur	National Film Award for Second Best Feature Film	
1976	21st National Film Awards	Nishant	National Film Award for Best Feature Film in Hindi	
1977	22nd National Film Awards	Manthan	National Film Award for Best Feature Film in Hindi	
1978	23rd National Film Awards	Bhumika: The Role	National Film Award for Best Screenplay	
1979	24th National Film Awards	Junoon	National Film Award for Best Feature Film in Hindi	
1982	27th National Film Awards	Arohan	National Film Award for Best Feature Film in Hindi	
2005	50th National Film Awards	Overall Contribution to the Indian Cinema	Dadasaheb Phalke Award	
2005	50th National Film Awards	Netaji Subhas Chandra Bose: The Forgotten Hero	Nargis Dutt Award for Best Feature Film on National Integration	
2009	54th National Film Awards	Well Done Abba	National Film Award for Best Film on Other Social Issues	

Non Feature Films

- 1984 Best Historical Reconstruction for Nehru
- 1985 Best Biographical Film for Satyajit Ray

Feature Films

- 1986 Best Director for Trikal
- 1993 Best Feature Film in Hindi for Suraj Ka Satvan Ghoda
- 1995 Best Feature Film in Hindi for Mammo
- 1996 Best Feature Film in English for The Making of the Mahatma
- 1997 Best Feature Film in Urdu for Sardari Begum
- 1999 Best Feature Film for Samar
- 1999 Best Feature Film on Family Welfare for Hari-Bhari
- 2001 Best Feature Film in Hindi for Zubeidaa
- 2005 Nargis Dutt Award for Best Feature Film on National Integration for Netaji Subhas Chandra Bose: The Forgotten Hero
- Best Film on Other Social Issues for Well Done Abba

Filmfare Awards

- 1980 Best Director for Junoon
- 2025 Filmfare Lifetime Achievement Award

Cannes Film Festival

- 1976: Golden Palm: Nishant: Nominated

Berlin International Film Festival

- 1974 Golden Berlin Bear for Ankur: Nominated

Moscow International Film Festival

- 1981 Golden Prize: Kalyug
- 1997 Golden St. George: Sardari Begum: Nominated

- Nandi Awards

- B. N. Reddy National Award for contribution to Indian Cinema

=== Honours ===
- 1970 Homi Bhabha Fellowship (1970–72)
- 1976 Padma Shri
- 1989 Sovietland Nehru Award
- 1991 Padma Bhushan
- 2012 D. Litt. Honoris Causa of the University of Calcutta
- 2013 ANR National Award
- 2016 D. Litt. "Honoris Causa" of ITM University, Gwalior (M.P.)

== Bibliography ==
- Benegal on Ray: Satyajit Ray, a Film, by Shyam Benegal, Alaknanda Datta, Samik Banerjee. Seagull Books, 1988. ISBN 81-7046-021-2.
- Shyam Benegal's the Churning (Manthan): Screenplay, by, Vijay Tendulkar, Shyam Benegal, Samik Banerjee. Seagull Books, 1984. ISBN 0-86132-070-0.
- Shyam Benegal: Film-maker of the Real India, by Arjun Sengupta. Niyogi Books, 2024. ISBN 978-8119626182.
