= List of Indian film producers =

This is a list of notable Indian film producers.

== A ==
- A. V. Meiyappan
- Aamir Khan
- Adarsh Iyengar
- Aditya Chopra
- Abhishek Pathak
- Aditya Dhar
- Arun Kumar Ahuja
- Arun Nalawade
- Arbaaz Khan
- Aanand L. Rai
- Anand Pandit
- Anubhav Sinha
- Anurag Basu
- Anurag Kashyap
- Anil Kapoor
- Anku Pande
- Akshay Kumar
- Ajay Devgn
- Allu Aravind
- Aly Morani
- Anand Gandhi
- Ashutosh Gowariker
- Anil Chaudhary (filmmaker)
- Ashok Dhanuka
- Arunabh Kumar
- Alvira Khan Agnihotri
- Anushka Sharma

== B ==
- Bimal Roy
- Boney Kapoor
- B. R. Chopra
- Bhimsain
- Bhushan Kumar

== C ==
- Chetan Anand

== D ==
- Dinesh Vijan
- D. V. V. Danayya
- Dev Anand
- Dalsukh M. Pancholi
- Deepshikha Deshmukh
- Dil Raju
- Dinesh Vijan
- Dhillin Mehta
- Dilip Kumar

== E ==
- Ekta Kapoor

== F ==
- Farhan Akhtar

== G ==
- G. P. Sippy
- Gajendra Ahire
- Ganesh Jain
- Gauri Khan
- Gaurav Dhingra
- Gulshan Kumar
- Gulshan Rai
- Guneet Monga
- Guru Dutt

== H ==
- Hali Welly
- Hansal Mehta
- Harry Baweja
- Harman Baweja
- Hemant Kumar
- Hemen Gupta
- Himanshu Rai

== I ==
- I. S. Johar
- Indra Kumar
- Ishan Arya

== J ==
- J. Om Prakash
- J. P. Dutta
- Jackky Bhagnani
- Jayantilal Gada
- Jyoti Deshpande
- Jaspreet Kaur
- Johnny Bakshi
- John Matthew Matthan

== K ==
- K. Balaji
- K. Amarnath
- K. Asif
- K. C. Bokadia
- Karan Johar
- Karim Morani
- Karuna Badwal
- Kangana Ranaut
- Kavita K. Barjatya
- Kaveri
- Ketan Desai
- Kiran Rao
- Krishan Kumar
- Kishore Lulla
- Krishika Lulla

== L ==
- L. V. Prasad
- Luv Ranjan

== M ==
- Madhu Mantena
- Mahaveer Jain
- Mahesh Babu
- Mahesh Kaul
- Mahesh Bhatt
- Mani Ratnam
- Manoj Nandwana
- Manoj Kumar
- Mehboob Khan
- Manmohan Desai
- Manmohan Shetty
- Mehul Kumar
- Mohan Kumar
- Mona Shourie Kapoor
- Mukesh Bhatt
- Mukesh Duggal
- Murad Khetani
- Mushir Alam

== N ==
- N. C. Sippy
- Nallamalupu Bujji
- Namit Malhotra
- Nasir Hussain
- NIkhil Advani
- Nitin Kapoor
- N. Chandra
- Nitin Chandrakant Desai

== P ==
- Pahlaj Nihalani
- Pallavi Joshi
- Prakash Mehra
- Pramod Chakravorty
- Pradeep Uppoor
- Pritish Nandy

== R ==
- R. V. Pandit
- R.K. Nayyar
- Rahul Dholakia
- Raj Kapoor
- Raj Khosla
- Rajkumar Barjatya
- Rajkumar Hirani
- Raj Nidimoru and Krishna D.K.
- Rakesh Roshan
- Rakeysh Omprakash Mehra
- Ram Gopal Varma
- Ramanand Sagar
- Ramesh Behl
- Ramon Chibb
- Randhir Kapoor
- Ravi Agrawal (film producer)
- Ravi Chopra
- Remo D'Souza
- Ritesh Sidhwani
- Rhea Kapoor
- Rockline Venkatesh
- Rohit Gupta
- Rohit Shetty
- Ronnie Screwvala

== S ==
- S. M. Sriramulu Naidu
- Sajid Nadiadwala
- Sanjay Gupta
- Sam Fernandes
- Sameer Nair
- Sashadhar Mukherjee
- Salem Chandrasekharan
- Salman Khan
- Sanjay Leela Bhansali
- Siddharth Roy Kapur
- Shakti Samanta
- Shahrukh Khan
- Shital Bhatia
- Shobha Kapoor
- Shoojit Sircar
- Sivaji Ganesan
- Sunny Deol
- Shivendra Singh Dungarpur
- Sohail Khan
- Sooraj Barjatya
- Subhash Ghai
- Sudhakar Bokade
- Sunil Bohra
- Suneel Darshan
- Sunil Dutt
- Sunil Manchanda
- Surinder Kapoor

== T ==
- Tahir Hussain
- Tarachand Barjatya

== V ==
- V. Shantaram
- Vaishal Shah
- Vashu Bhagnani
- Vibha Bakshi
- Vidhi Kasliwal
- Vidhu Vinod Chopra
- Vinay Kumar Sinha
- Vineet Jain
- Vikas Bahl
- Vikram Bhatt
- Vikramaditya Motwane
- Vishal Bhardwaj
- Vishnu Mathur
- Vishesh Bhatt
- Vipul Shah
- Vivek Agnihotri
- Vivek Agrawal

== Y ==
- Yash Johar

== Z ==
- Zoya Akhtar
