= Krishna Shah =

American film producer

- Born: 10 May 1938; Bombay, India
- Died: 13 October 2013 (aged 75); Mumbai
- Occupations: Filmmaker, distribution executive
- Years active: 1960–2013
- Known for: The River Niger; Rivals; Shalimar; Hard Rock Zombies
- Spouse: Diane Hillman (m. 1969)
- Children: 1

Krishna Shah (10 May 1938 – 13 October 2013) was an Indian-American/Gujarati film and theatre director, screenwriter, playwright, producer, and production/distribution executive.

Shah was considered the first Indian to create the crossover between Bollywood and Hollywood. He began his career with international stage plays and also screenplay work for US television, but is perhaps best known for directing the feature films Shalimar and The River Niger. In his middle years, Shah was involved with the low budget cult circuit, directing and distributing movies such as Hard Rock Zombies and Ted & Venus, the later of which he executive produced through his Double Helix Films banner.

Shah was a perennial of the international film distribution scene, where he spent decades in various sales, production, and leadership capacities.

In 1984, after years of creating nothing but financial and critical failures at both the US and Indian motion picture box office, Shah became famously "enraged" over the lack of interest in his film catalogue by distributors in his native India, saying, "the difference between filmmaking in Hollywood and India is like the difference between steak and curry."

In a 2010 interview, Shah said to Dinesh Raheja of Mid Day News, "I was the (M.) Night Shyamalan of my times."

Upon his death in 2013, iconic Bollywood actress Zeenat Aman described Shah as "a very warm and hospitable man".

== Early years ==
=== Stage ===
Shah began his life in the entertainment business by writing and directing stage plays, internationally. As Artistic Director of the Indian National Theatre, he mounted Rabindranath Tagore's 1910 King of the Dark Chamber in New York City in 1961. Later that year, Shah and Dark Chamber were brought to the South African theatre scene by the black professional group Union Artists. In 1962, Dark Chamber opened in Durban before playing at the University of the Witwatersrand's Great Hall. Shah was then honored with a theatre company created in his name (the Shah Theatre Academy), while Professor Dennis Schauffer of the University of Durban-Westville would later write a scholarly paper titled "In the Shadow of the Shah" which explained in detail Shah's contribution to South Africa's cultural enlightenment.

In 1963, Krishna Shah directed the three act Sponono, which he'd co-written with South African author and anti-apartheid activist Alan Paton. It was Shah's idea to convert three of Paton's preexisting short stories into a stage play. Shah and Paton worked together on the script, and Union Artists were tapped for actors and other contributions. Sponono debuted 12 December 1962 at ML Sultan Theatre, Durban, then travelled to Sea Point, Johannesburg, and on to Pietermaritzburg's Lotus Hall in March 1963. Cape Times critic Ivor Jones said the play was an "exciting dramatic contrivance (that) drew a packed multi-racial audience to its opening night" while Tony Williams Short of The Argus noted the play's "universal theme" as being "a profound study of the subtleties and depths of forgiveness."

In 1964, Shah and Paton took Sponono to the Cort Theatre on Broadway, a well-considered venue renamed in 2022 to The James Earl Jones Theatre. At the Cort, US stage producer Mary Frank took control of Sponono. The play had many internal difficulties. Frank fired Shah shortly before opening night and proceeded to change pivotal aspects of the play. Shah vehemently protested these changes, stating that the play had seen success in South Africa and that the changes Frank was making would destroy the meaning and presentation. Shah was subsequently forbidden to be near the play's cast or production, with Frank citing Shah as being "ill" for a cover story.

The play closed prematurely. Quite unlike its South African run, Sponono on Broadway was indeed a critical and financial failure. As the play was dying, Frank ran a confrontational and confusing ad in the New York Times, lambasting the city's "Negroes and liberals" for not attending the show, while crediting the play completely to Shah and Paton as their work, alone. It was twenty years before Frank would produce her next and final play, while Krishna Shah would abandon the world of theatre to explore film and television. Paton himself expressed regret at the "tragic" occurrences due to Frank's interference, saying, "I now wish, of course, that we had not presented the play on Broadway."

=== UCLA film school ===
After the mid-1960s fiasco of Sponono on Broadway, Krishna Shah became a UCLA student, enrolling in the university's film program of the day. During May 1966 his student short film Our Gang debuted at UCLA's "Talking Pictures" semi-annual evening of films. Our Gang was praised as "the best and most truly imaginative movie of the batch". Shah would years later repeatedly claim that Our Gang had won second place at a UCLA school competition, while director George Lucas' THX 1138 student film had won first. However, Lucas was a USC School of Cinematic Arts student, and the original student version of Lucas' 1138 film was not screened in public until 1967.

=== US television ===
In 1966, Krishna Shah's "The Abominable Snowman Affair" was purchased by MGM Television for season three of its hit series The Man from U.N.C.L.E.. The episode, number 13 for the season and number 72 overall, was broadcast 9 December 1966. Fans of the show would later consider the episode among the worst of the series.

Shah would later share a 1968 Story by credit with John McGreevey and Albert Mannheimer on the ABC Television show The Flying Nun. The episode, titled "Tonio's Mother," was first season, number 19.

In 1973, Shah directed vignettes in two episodes of the Paramount Television series Love, American Style. Shah's Love and the Clinical Problem appeared season five, episode 33, and featured Dr. Joyce Brothers in a comedic take on sex clinics of the times. On 23 November 1973, Shah's Love and the Time Machine aired, with Cindy Williams as the subject of a temporal experiment.

Krishna Shah worked for Universal Television in 1974, directing a single episode of the Raymond Burr show Ironside. His episode, called "Once More for Joey," was part of Ironside's seventh season.

Shah's work in US television concluded with his single episode contribution to the series The Six Million Dollar Man, again for Universal. The episode aired 24 March 1974 with the title "Dr. Wells Is Missing". Shah shared a Written by credit with Elroy Schwartz, William J. Keenan, and Lionel E. Siegel. The episode established that character Steve Austin could push his bionic legs beyond 60 mph (97 km/h).

== Motion pictures (as director) ==
=== Rivals ===
In June 1969, The Hollywood Reporter announced that MGM and Warner Bros. had optioned The Wound, a Krishna Shah original screenplay. Monroe Sachson would direct the picture as his feature film debut, and the script's working title became Jaimie for a time. Two years later Variety reported that the rights for the screenplay had reverted to Shah, due to production delays. In 1972, Shah decided to produce and finance the movie himself, and also direct. With the help of Wall Street brother-in-law N. Norman Muller, Shah mounted the film---now called Rivals---via investments from members of the Muttontown and Hampshire country clubs of Long Island, a process undertaken by Muller who had membership at both venues.

Shah was able to set a cast that included Joan Hackett, Robert Klein, and Scott Jacoby in the leading roles. The film was shot in and around New York City, and was distributed by Avco Embassy in 1972. Upon its release---and in all the years since---Rivals was widely savaged by critics large and small. Roger Greenspun of The New York Times called the film "terrible in such eccentric ways and with such a desire to instruct that I can't deny it certain values, though probably never the values it intended." The US Conference of Catholic Bishops deemed the movie "repugnant trash" and gave it their Morally Offensive mark.

In an attempt to rescue the movie from its box office failure, the film was re-released as Deadly Rivals. It was hoped the audience for thriller genre movies would respond to the new name, but they did not. In 1982 another attempt was made to switch the title when distributor Jack H. Harris reissued the film for theatres, branding it Sex and the Single Parent.

=== The River Niger ===
James Earl Jones, Cicely Tyson, and Lou Gossett, Jr. would headline Krishna Shah's second feature film, The River Niger.

In May 1973, the film rights to Joseph A. Walker's Tony and Pulitzer-winning Broadway play The River Niger were purchased from The Negro Ensemble Company at a price "well into six figures," by veteran producer Sidney Beckerman. After rejections by all the major studios and larger independent financiers, Beckerman contacted Isaac L. Jones for help. Jones successfully solicited a nationwide group of black businessmen affiliated with Minority Enterprise Small Business Investment Corporations (MESBIC), a program established under the Nixon administration to stimulate investments in minority owned and controlled businesses. Jones later stated that The River Niger was the first major film to be financed entirely with MESBIC capital. "I hope this film is successful for our backers," he said. "We all despise black exploitation films and want to create alternatives."

Krishna Shah was then selected to direct. In May 1975 it was reported that the filming of The River Niger---also known as Ghetto Warriors---was underway, with a budget of nearly US$800,000 (approximately US$3,900,000 in 2019, when adjusted for inflation). On 26 December 1975, The Hollywood Reporter stated that principal photography had been concluded, and that Shah had finished the film under budget and in only 19 days.

The River Niger had its 2 April 1976 world premiere in Chicago, with a general Los Angeles opening 7 April 1976. Despite the award-winning source material and superb cast, box office was minimal and reviews were largely negative. Roger Ebert gave the film two stars, saying "(it) has good intentions and several very well-acted scenes. But its direction is a mess". Chief film critic Vincent Canby of The New York Times called the movie "a screen disappointment" and "virtually an object lesson in how not to make a movie out of a theater piece," saying the overall narrative had "a total lack of cohesive style and cinematic intelligence". TV Guide would later say that the film "misses the mark due to Shah's uncertain direction," while giving the movie two stars. However, Leonard Maltin gave the film three stars, calling it an "intelligent, moving story" that was "touching and convincing."

For her work in the role of Mattie, Cicely Tyson would go on to win the 1976 NAACP Image Award for Outstanding Actress in a Motion Picture.

=== Shalimar ===
This Indo-American production, Krishna Shah's 1978 film Shalimar, was touted as the most expensive film ever made in India at the time and employed an ambitious galaxy of international stars. Shah himself said the film would be "a caper film to end all caper films." Instead, as recorded by longtime columnist and film historian Dinesh Raheja, "Shalimar was an epic disaster that changed the course of Bollywood itself. Nobody dared attempt a Hollywood collaboration for a long time thereafter."

Recalling the beginnings of Shalimar, novelist Manohar Malgonkar said, "Krishna Shah wrote the screenplay of Shalimar, based on a story written jointly with Stanford Sharman. After that, (Shah) lived with it for several years, chopping and changing, pruning and adding, revising and polishing, before he made it into a film."

Shalimar went on to rate sixth on a list of the top 10 Bollywood flops of the 1970s. As with the previous failure of Rivals, Shah and his investors re-released Shalimar under several different titles in an attempt to somehow recoup the millions lost. One such "decoy" title was Raiders of the Sacred Stone, which had its own re-designed poster.

=== Cinema Cinema ===
After the spectacular financial and critical failure of Shalimar, Krishna Shah turned to the documentary circuit with his 1979 montage film Cinema Cinema. The film's premise is a 1970s Indian movie theatre audience engaged in watching a pastiche of historically significant Bollywood cinema clips, and their reactions to it. The documentary has accrued wildly mixed reviews. However, Soumyadip Choudhury gave the film a "must watch" accolade, and Live Mint's Uday Bhatia and Jai Arjun Singh said Cinema Cinema is "(a) charming history lesson" that was "lovingly assembled by Shah".

=== Hard Rock Zombies ===
In 1985, Krishna Shah tried his hand at writing, producing, and directing for the comedy-horror genre with his movie Hard Rock Zombies. The film failed financially and was universally panned by critics, with Philip Brophy saying it "(has) the most ludicrous dialogue you'll ever hear short of an Ed Wood Jr. movie," and Evan Wade of Something Awful observing that "the only way this movie could be shittier is if it was a slideshow of Photoshop images featuring Ackbar battling Chuck Norris over a volcano full of robot dinosaurs. Also, it takes itself very seriously."

Adding insult to injury, Krishna Shah's on-screen "Written by" credit is misspelt.

=== American Drive-In ===
Krishna Shah's self-created parallel to George Lucas (whom Shah never knew) would again come to the foreground in his 1985 American Drive-In. The film, a critical and box office washout, was Shah's final movie as director. Veteran critic Leonard Klady of The Los Angeles Times offered that American Drive-In should be considered "the destitute man's American Graffiti." He continued by saying, "(the film) is such a desperate stab at entertainment that if one were stranded on a desert island surrounded by sharks with only this movie to watch, you'd opt for water skiing."

== Distribution and production ==
In the late 1980s and early 1990s, Krishna Shah had a small string of ongoing boutique distribution and agenting companies, starting with his "Movie Reps" shingle that was based in a luxury high-rise residential condominium on Hollywood Boulevard and La Brea. Movie Reps would regularly attend most and sometimes all of the film markets such as MIFED (Mercato internazionale del film e del documentario), MIPCOM, AFM, and Cannes, carrying with it a slate of generally low-budget "schlock" fare, sold to various effect.

=== Movie Reps ===
In the late 1980s, Krishna Shah established Movie Reps, a company acting as middleman between film distributors and producers. Shah said to Variety in a January 1991 interview, "Producers need me because I can get their films distributed. Distributors need me because I can make sure they are buying all the rights that they think they are." (Variety incorrectly reported the name of Shah's company in the article, calling it Media Reps. A correction was not issued.)

Krishna Shah and his Movie Reps would become involved with hundreds of international independent producers, distributors, financiers, and associated personnel, generally in the micro to low-budget arena. People such as Nagesh Kukunoor, Bud Cort, Ron Marchini, David Carradine (then on the downside of his career), and even Timothy Leary were regularly in and out the door of the Movie Reps offices. At one point, Hugh Grant and Elizabeth Hurley---both largely unknown at the time---made an appointment with Shah, to consider buying his condo unit. After they came by to have a look, nothing ever became of it.

In 1995, Krishna Shah claimed to have generated US$2-million for Movie Reps from a deal he made to distribute a previously unknown Jim Carrey TV movie, Introducing Janet. The movie was later retitled as Rubberface.

In the twilight era of Shah's Movie Reps company, he would find himself involved with Pakistani filmmaker Aslam Ansari Mohammad who claimed to have been attacked by an assassin on a Los Angeles freeway due to his public meetings with Krishna Shah and writer Michel Potts, regarding a screenplay about a CIA killing.

=== Double Helix Films ===
Krishna Shah began his work with Double Helix Films while he was still running Movie Reps. He commissioned professionally designed, multi-page newsletters for every major market the company attended. Used as sales and publicity tools, they featured extravagant, sometimes fictitious accounts of clients and projects. In the centerfold, Shah placed an extensive list of the Double Helix library offerings, with micro-descriptions of the entire collection. These descriptions were so over-the-top and ridiculous that they became widely known in markets such as Cannes, where various market attendees would be seen on the Croisette, reading the centerfold and laughing about it.

In 1991 Krishna Shah bought the Double Helix Films library from Odyssey Entertainment, signing a US$3.6-million IOU note via brother-in-law N. Norman Muller, at the time CEO of Odyssey. Shah became President of Double Helix Films, and would default on the arranged IOU in 1993. His Double Helix library was sold to ATC II, Inc.

Double Helix was involved in numerous lawsuits, including Krishna Shah's personal suit against Muller, and vice versa.

=== Carnegie Film Group ===
For a time, Krishna Shah was President of yet another distribution outfit, the Carnegie Film Group, which was created from the ashes of Double Helix Films. Shah would find his company embroiled in various lawsuits. Carnegie closed its doors in 1995.

== Unrealized projects ==
Several of Shah's high-profile "dream movies" were never realized. While numerous stories of these films circulated for decades in the established international media, not a single project came to fruition.

=== Baiju - The Gypsy ===
In 2010, Shah announced his remake of Baiju Bawra, with A.R. Rahman already aboard to do music. The film, later retitled Baiju - The Gypsy, was shelved. Shah then attempted to publicly auction his script to the highest bidder.

=== Taj ===
In August 2000 a Screen Daily piece mentioned that Shah was in the talent scouting phase for his Taj Mahal, a film expected to enter production in 2001. Eight years later, the project was announced as a US$25-million epic historical romance, now renamed Taj. Shah reportedly sold the script to "Hollywood" for Rs 2 Crore (approximately US$345,000 in 2019, when accounting inflation) and said there were "feelers" from Ridley Scott, Michael Rymer, Silvio Sardi, and Ramoji Rao. Shah commented that his script was being compared to the works of Shakespeare by professionals in the Hollywood film industry. Later, it was reported that Michael Radford was attached to direct. Still, nothing became of Taj and it never appeared in the news again.

=== Slate announcement ===
Krishna Shah started a Mumbai-based production company in 2003, calling it Movie Moghuls. He announced a slate of three films, each of them in some state of preproduction, but nothing ever became of them.

=== Mother: The Indira Gandhi Story (aka Birth of a Nation) ===
In 2009, Krishna Shah announced Tom Hanks and Tommy Lee Jones as "being lined up" for the roles of Lyndon B. Johnson and Richard Nixon in Shah's upcoming cinematic account of Indira Gandhi's life story, his self-written Birth of a Nation. Shah also announced that, "the 'Queen of Bollywood,' Madhuri Dixit, has been picked to play the title role." Also mentioned as pending cast were Emily Watson and Albert Finney. Later, Helen Mirren was said to be "in talks" for the film but when interviewed on the matter Mirren said, "No, no. I'm not interested in biopics or anything of the sort."

On 21 November 2009, a story was released that confirmed Madhuri Dixit had indeed been enticed to "sign on the dotted line" for the role of Indira Gandhi. Dixit immediately issued a counter-statement explaining that all reports of her playing the title character were premature, as she had not yet agreed to the role.

In January 2010 the Birth of a Nation budget had inflated to US$65-million, and the project was labeled "propaganda" by some in the Sikh community.

During the Cannes Film Festival of May 2010, Telegraph India journalist Amit Roy was told by Krishna Shah that Birth of a Nation was set to be made in two parts, "...like Lord of the Rings." Shah said he'd written 18 drafts of the script to date. Shah also pointed out that his earlier plan to cast actress Madhuri Dixit in the lead had been "ditched," and he had instead gotten three other actresses secretly lined up.

In August 2010 Krishna Shah told Dubai's Gulf News that his Birth of a Nation script "...(had) been re-worked after I got my hands on Richard Nixon's personal tapes related to the 1971 Bangladesh War." Shah also indicated that high-profile Bollywood actress Priyanka Chopra was now his preferred casting choice for the Indira Gandhi role, based on his conversations with Academy Award-winning makeup artist Jenny Shircore. In the first week of October 2010 Krishna Shah made a sudden turnaround, revealing to India TV News that Hindi actress Kareena Kapoor would take the Indira Gandhi role. This change was reported as due to makeup artists Jenny Shircore (and additionally Greg Cannom) deciding that Kapoor would be better suited than Chopra, for Indira Gandhi's physical transformations throughout the film. The article states, "While Shircore, who won the Academy (Award) for her work in Elizabeth, had felt that Priyanka is the only actress, Connam, who has worked on The Curious Case of Benjamin Button, has now started to think that Kareena is more perfect." According to Shah, the various Gandhi makeup effects would require much of Kapoor; for example, an hour to apply for Indira at age 20, two hours at age 50, and three hours at age 67. Less than a month later Shah would comment about his casting process with a confusing statement: "As it stands today, only two actors in Bollywood are on the scanner (for the role of Indira): One is Kareena Kapoor and the other is Priyanka Chopra."

In December 2010 Krishna Shah gave another interview regarding his Indira movie, with the headline "My Film Will Be Out in 2012".

In March 2012 Krishna Shah was again asked if Madhuri Dixit would be carrying the lead in Birth of a Nation. His answer was an emphatic no. "It will be essayed," he said, "by either a newcomer or a Bollywood star, somebody who can capture the spirit and stature of Indira Gandhi".

In April 2012 The Times of India carried a Q&A with Krishna Shah and director Bruce Beresford titled "A 2014 Oscar for Indira?". Beresford confirms his attachment to the project as director while Shah brushes off any idea of problems with the Gandhi family, saying, "This story is in the public domain and as an artiste, I have the right to interpret and depict it, based on factual material. They (Gandhis) know I am doing this film. I haven't sought any permission, nor do I need to. Through intermediaries, however, we have informed them."

As reported by high society columnist Nisha Jamwal (aka Nisha JamVwal), in July 2012 Krishna Shah threw an "Indira Gandhi Gala"---hosted at Juhu Chowpatty Beach, Mumbai---to celebrate the pending Birth of a Nation production. In attendance and pictured with Shah were director Bruce Beresford, along with Hollywood's "Power Couple" of former Creative Artists Agency co-chairman Rick Nicita and producer/talent agent Paula Wagner. Others photographed at the gala included Zeenat Aman, Poonam Dhillon, Neena Gupta, Soni Razdan, Deepa Sahi, Rohini Hattangadi, Kalpana Lazmi, Ashutosh Gowarikar, Prateik Babbar, Ketan Mehta, and Sanjay Chhel. Jamwal states, "For me the most fascinating part of the evening was the mini-film that Krishna and Bruce showcased through the cocktails. The film uses modern technology to morph several well known Hollywood and Bollywood actors as Indian politicians. This was done to illustrate what Beresford had carefully planned with Krishna to indicate whom he was thinking of, for which role."

After the gala there was no further public information regarding Birth of a Nation. Since the time of his death in 2013, Krishna Shah's Indira Gandhi project remains unmade.

== Later years ==
Krishna Shah kept occupied in his later years by traveling the speaker circuit and hosting various filmmaking forums, seminars, and discussions.

Shah also claimed to have made "a lot of money" in his ongoing work as a Hollywood Script Doctor.

== Filmography ==
Year	Title	Director	Producer	Writer	Notes
1966	Our Gang	Yes	Yes	Yes	UCLA student short film
1972	Rivals	Yes	No	Yes	
1976	The River Niger	Yes	No	No	
1978	Shalimar	Yes	No	Yes	
1979	Cinema Cinema	Yes	No	Yes	Documentary
1985	Hard Rock Zombies	Yes	Yes	Yes	
1985	American Drive-In	Yes	Yes	Yes	
1992	Night Caller	No	Yes	No	
2001	The Prince of Light: The Legend of Ramayana	No	Yes	Yes	
2011	Dance India Dance (Doubles)	Yes	No	No	

Executive producer

- Evil Laugh (1986)
- Omega Cop (1990)
- Ted & Venus (1991)

Supervising Producer

- Sleepaway Camp IV: The Survivor (1991)

Television

Year	Title	Director	Writer	Notes
1966	The Man from U.N.C.L.E.	No	Yes	Episode "The Abominable Snowman Affair"
1968	The Flying Nun	No	Story	Episode "Tonio's Mother"
1973	Love, American Style	Yes	No	2 episodes
1974	Ironside	Yes	No	Episode "Once More for Joey"
1974	The Six Million Dollar Man	No	Yes	Episode "Dr. Wells Is Missing"
