= Rivals (1972 film) =

1972 film by Krishna Shah

- Theatrical release poster
- Directed by: Krishna Shah
- Written by: Krishna Shah
- Produced by: Willard W. Goodman
- Starring: Joan Hackett; Robert Klein; Scott Jacoby; Jeanne Tanzy Williams; Glen Hayes; Phoebe Dorin
- Cinematography: Harvey Genkins
- Edited by: Arline Garson
- Music by: Peter Matz
- Production company: Muttontown
- Distributed by: AVCO Embassy Pictures
- Release date: August 23, 1972
- Running time: 103 minutes
- Country: United States
- Language: English

Rivals is a 1972 American drama film written and directed by Krishna Shah. The film stars Joan Hackett, Robert Klein, Scott Jacoby, Jeanne Tanzy Williams, Glen Hayes and Phoebe Dorin. The film was released on August 23, 1972, by AVCO Embassy Pictures.

== Plot ==
Peter is a wacky free spirit who runs a New York tour specifically for New Yorkers. Christine is an uptight art gallery owner, recently widowed, who is stepping back out into the dating world. He pesters her into going out with him and, since she cannot perceive the difference between obnoxious behavior and charm, she falls in love with him. There's a problem, though. Her 10-year-old son, Jamie is a loonball. He loves her way too much, and has an unhealthy and pathological attachment to his mother. After she remarries, his rage and misery overwhelm him and he plots to kill his stepfather.

== Cast ==
- Joan Hackett as Christine
- Robert Klein as Peter
- Scott Jacoby as Jamie
- Jeanne Tanzy Williams as Mary
- Glen Hayes as Douglas
- Phoebe Dorin as Madge
- James Karen as Child Psychiatrist
- Randy Digeronimo as Tony
- Frank Fiore as Phil
- Bill Herndon as Bob
- William Shust as Culloux
- Leib Lensky as Rabbi
- Viola Swayne as Mrs. Sturgess
- Craig Noel as Salesman
- Iris Whitney as Matron
- Ann Miles as Girl

== See also ==
Other films directed by Krishna Shah:

- The River Niger
- Shalimar
- Hard Rock Zombies
- American Drive-In
