= The River Niger (film) =

1976 film by Krishna Shah

- Home Video cover
- Directed by: Krishna Shah
- Written by: Joseph A. Walker (play, screenplay)
- Produced by: Sidney Beckerman
- Starring: Cicely Tyson; James Earl Jones; Louis Gossett Jr. Glynn Turman; Jonelle Allen; Roger E. Mosley
- Cinematography: Michael D. Margulies
- Edited by: Irving Lerner
- Music by: Jerry Goldstein; War
- Distributed by: Cine Artists Pictures; Continental Video; Reel Media Int'l
- Release date: 14 April 1976
- Running time: 105 minutes
- Country: United States
- Language: English

The River Niger is a 1976 film adaptation of the 1972 Joseph A. Walker play of the same title. The film was directed by Krishna Shah, and starred James Earl Jones, Cicely Tyson, and Louis Gossett Jr. The film had a limited commercial release in 1976 and has rarely been seen in later years. The soundtrack is by War, including the theme song "River Niger".

== Plot ==
Johnny Williams (James Earl Jones) is a working house painter and amateur poet who is trying to live in a contemporary ghetto in Watts, Los Angeles, California. Though he is trying to provide for his almost stable family, times are hard. Johnny's main pride and joy, his son Jeff (played by Glynn Turman) just returned from U.S. Air Force flight school, where he finally reveals that he flunked out, causing great disillusionment. This film follows Johnny's struggle and a few who try to help, including his physician friend Dr. Dudley Stanton (Louis Gossett Jr.), who purchases Johnny's poems while treating his ailing wife Mattie (played by Cicely Tyson), whose cancer is recurring. When Johnny's son kills a local gang member, and the gang shoots a police officer, the situation escalates to a standoff with the police and another shootout in Johnny's house.

== Cast ==
- Cicely Tyson as Mattie Williams
- James Earl Jones as Johnny Williams
- Louis Gossett Jr. as Dr. Dudley Stanton
- Glynn Turman as Jeff Williams
- Jonelle Allen as Ann Vanderguild
- Roger E. Mosley as Moe "Big Moe" Hayes
- Ralph Wilcox as Al
- Teddy Wilson as "Chips"
- Charles Weldon as "Skeeter"
- Zakes Mokae as "Dutch"
- Tony Burton as Policeman

== Reception ==
Marc Krystal of The Herald-Journal liked but saw some flaws. He said it "is only occasionally dimmed by poor dialogue and an uncomfortable attitude toward women Walker's screenplay while usually both streetwise and lyrical sometimes goes stagy unnatural and forced The River Niger speaks to Blacks in a resounding voice But it is not without meaning for white people — not just because its themes are universal: simply because whites can learn something about Black Americans hum this movie If for some reason that isn't enough then see The River Niger for its fire and poignancy or its dazzling performances. But see it.

Don Morisson of The Minneapolis Star found it too melodramatic, and cliche, but the acting outstanding. He says that "some of the characters and situations are hard to believe because they are such obviously set-up vehicles for the playwright's arguments and desired effects admissible under stage convention, but strained by the naturalistic demands of screen narrative, which also highlight many Don Morrison artificialities of spoken language, exciting and satisfying though the speeches may be. Despite, all that, I recommend the picture for the highly personal performances of its superb all-black cast. Each one of the actors infuses so much private energy that they triumph over all but the worst shortcomings".

== See also ==
Other films directed by Krishna Shah:

- Rivals
- Shalimar
- Hard Rock Zombies
- American Drive-In
