= Bh Se Bhade =

Indian television comedy drama series

- Genre: Comedy drama
- Created by: Jamnadas Majethia
- Written by: Aatish Kapadia
- Country of origin: India
- Original language: Hindi
- No. of seasons: 1

Production
- Producers: Jamnadas Majethia; Aatish Kapadia
- Production company: Hats Off Productions

Original release
- Network: Zee TV
- Release: 26 October 2013

Bh Se Bhade is an Indian Hindi-languagecomedy drama television series aired on Zee TV. Produced by Jamnadas Majethia and Aatish Kapadia, it stars Deven Bhojani, Gulfam Khan, Sarita Joshi, Suchita Trivedi, Atul Parchure, Varun Khandelwal, Bhavna Khatri, and Dushyant Wagh.

== Plot ==
Bh se Bhade is a show that revolves around a 55-year-old man, Mr. Bhadrakant Devilal Bhade, who has a special quality of taking away people's problems on himself. That problem could be anything under the sun. He can even take a pregnant women's pregnancy if needed for some time. But there is a condition of this exchange. Once the situation is alright, the giver has to take his problem back. Nobody has any idea about when and how Bhade developed this special quality. The Concept of the show is based on short story of popular Marathi writer Vasant Purshottam Kale aka Va.Pu.Kale by Name 'Bhade'.

== Cast ==
- Deven Bhojani as Bhadrakant Devilal Bhade
- Suchita Trivedi as Sushma Bhade; Bhade's wife
- Sarita Joshi as Kalyani; Bhade's mother-in-law
- Varun Khandelwal as Sunil; Bhade's son
- Bhavna Khatri as Menaka/Khali Khopdi; Bhade's daughter-in-law
- Dushyant Wagh as Chunky; Menaka's brother
- Gulfam Khan as Lata
- Atul Parchure as Bhimsen Ganguly; Bhade's boss
- Sunil Holkar as Pandey, Bhade's colleague
- Nayan Shukla as Mukesh, Bhade's colleague
- Shivangi Singh as Monica, Bhade's colleague
- Subuhi Joshi as Satyawati; Bhade's Secretary
- Moorti Persaud as Babli; Monica's friend
- Usha Nadkarni as Inspector Usha Shinde
