= Bhavna Khatri =

Indian television Actress

- Born: India
- Occupation: Actress
- Years active: 2008–present

Bhavna Khatri is an Indian television Actress. She started her acting career with Khwaish on Sony TV as Tambreen and she was also seen in a famous TV serial called Kis Desh Mein Hai Meraa Dil which was aired on Star Plus. After Kis Desh Mein Hai Meraa Dil she received the lead role in the TV serial Jamunia on Imagine TV. last she was seen playing the lead role, Nirupama, in Pardes Mein Mila Koi Apna on Imagine TV and played the female parallel lead role as Anna D'Souza, in Badi Door Se Aaye Hain aired on SAB.She also played Chitralekha in the show Devon Ke Dev...Mahadev. She played Menaka in the comedy show Bh Se Bhade on See tv.

== Television ==
Title	Role
Khwaish	Tambreen
Kis Desh Mein Hai Meraa Dil	Kulraaj
Bh Se Bhade	Menka
Jamunia	Jamunia
Pardes Mein Mila Koi Apna	Nirupama
Badi Door Se Aaye Hai	Anna
Devon Ke Dev...Mahadev	Chitralekha

== Personal life ==
Khatri belongs Uttarakhand. Bhavna Khatri was born on 24 March 1987 in India. Bhavna Khatri first appeared in Indian television in Jamunia serial of Sony TV channel.
