= Abhilasha (1968 film) =

- Poster
- Directed by: Amit Bose
- Starring: Meena Kumari; Sanjay Khan; Nanda; Rehman
- Music by: R. D. Burman
- Release date: September 23, 1968
- Country: India
- Language: Hindi

Abhilasha is a 1968 Bollywood romantic film starring Meena Kumari, Sanjay Khan, Nanda, Rehman in lead roles. The film was directed by Amit Bose. The film's producer who was also a builder, built a bungalow in lieu of payment for Meena Kumari.

== Plot ==
A soon-to-be-married army officer faces rejection after he finds he was adopted as a child.

== Cast ==
- Meena Kumari as Meena Singh
- Sanjay Khan as Lieutenant Arun Singh
- Nanda as Ritu
- Rehman as Major General Ranjeet Singh
- Kashinath Ghanekar as Dr. Ajay Singh
- Sulochana Latkar as Geeta
- Murad as Rai Bahadur Daulatram
- Agha as Singing College Student
- Polson as Singing College Student
- Mohan Choti as Singing College Student

== Soundtrack ==
Abhilasha

Soundtrack album by R.D. Burman
- Released: January 1, 1968
- Genre: Feature film soundtrack
- Length: 27:57
- Label: Saregama India
- Producer: R.D. Burman

R.D. Burman chronology
Padosan (1968)	Abhilasha (1968)	Pyar Ka Mausam (1969)

The music was composed by R. D. Burman and Majrooh Sultanpuri wrote the lyrics. The song "Wadiyan Mera Daman" is known for its composition and also finished in the top 25 chart of Binaca Geetmala of 1969.

Songs
No.	Title	Singer(s)	Length
1.	"Wadiyan Mera Daman"	Mohammed Rafi	3:36
2.	"Pyar Hua Hai Jab Se"	Kishore Kumar & Lata Mangeshkar	4:39
3.	"Ek Janib Shame Mehfil"	Manna Dey & Mohammed Rafi	4:26
4.	"Munne Mere Aa"	Asha Bhosle	5:20
5.	"Yaaron Humara Kya"	Bhupinder Singh, Manna Dey & Maruti	5:55
6.	"Wadiyan Mera Daman"	Lata Mangeshkar	4:00
Total length:			27:57
