= Fever (2016 film) =

2016 Indian film written and directed by Rajeev Jhaveri

- Directed by: Rajeev Jhaveri
- Written by: Rajeev Jhaveri
- Produced by: Ravi Agrawal; Mahesh Balekundri; Rajat Manjunath; Ajay Chabria
- Starring: Rajeev Khandelwal; Gauahar Khan; Gemma Atkinson; Caterina Murino; Ankita Makwana
- Cinematography: Mujahid Raza
- Edited by: Rajeev Jhaveri
- Music by: Ranjit Barot; Tony Kakkar; Onésia Rithner; Shamir Tandon, Jacelyn Perry; Faizaan-Agnel; Rahul Jain; Rahul Bhatt; Tanishk Bagchi
- Production companies: Niche Film Farm Plus Entertainment Pvt. Ltd. ICM Entertainment Pvt. Ltd. Jaya Sapthagiri Productions
- Release date: 5 August 2016
- Running time: 123 minutes
- Country: India
- Language: Hindi

Fever is a 2016 Indian suspense thriller written and directed by Rajeev Jhaveri and produced by Ravi Agrawal, Mahesh Balekundri, Ajay Chabbria and Rajath Manjunath. The film features Gauahar Khan and Rajeev Khandelwal in the lead roles along with Gemma Atkinson, Caterina Murino and Ankita Makwana. The film was shot in Switzerland. The film was released on 5 August 2016.

== Plot ==
The movie starts with the protagonist, a man named Armin Salem, recovering in the hospital after a car accident, and is diagnosed as suffering from retrograde amnesia. There are only a few things that he remembers – his name, that he is originally from Paris, and furthermore that he might have committed the murder of a woman named Rhea Wagner.

He starts getting flashbacks and remembers the identity of a woman, identifying herself as Kavya, who keeps reappearing in his hallucinations along with Rhea. She then starts stalking him. Kavya's role in Armin's life is quite hazy, but eventually the truth is revealed as to why she is too close to Armin. Things become interesting when Armin meets Rhea, and remembers that he is Karan who is a writer and all the clips that he sees are the hidden shades of the writer himself. After losing the memory of Karan, the writer adopted the memory of Armin, who used to work as a contract killer, in his book. He is shown to be very smooth with the ladies and is also very quick with a gun. He also finds out that the woman named Kavya is none other than his wife, Pooja. When Pooja finds out that Karan has lost his memory, she introduces herself with a fake identity to regain her husband, as they were going through a rough patch in their marriage. She ends up killing a woman named Grace Soni, who is revealed to be Karan's girlfriend. She then manipulates him into thinking that someone is trying to trap him and that she will help him in every way possible. Finally, Pooja's motive is revealed when she helps Armin dump the dead body of Grace and flee from the scene. Pooja admits that it was the fever of her inner rage that gave her the courage to love someone despite not being loved back.

== Cast ==
- Rajeev Khandelwal as Armin Salem / Karan Warrier
- Gauahar Khan as Kavya Chaudhary / Pooja Warrier
- Gemma Atkinson as Rhea Wagner
- Victor Banerjee as Dr. David Roy
- Caterina Murino as Irina Caro
- Ankita Makwana as Grace Soni

== Soundtrack ==
Track listing
No.	Title	Lyrics	Music	Singer(s)	Length
1.	"Bas Ek Baar"	Rahul Bhatt	Rahul Bhatt	Arijit Singh	05:22
2.	"Besambhle"	A.M. Turaz	Tanishk Bagchi	Arijit Singh	04:34
3.	"Mile Ho Tum"	Tony Kakkar	Tony Kakkar	Tony Kakkar	04:24
4.	"Khara Khara"	Tony Kakkar	Tony Kakkar	Sonu Kakkar	03:15
5.	"Teri Yaad"	Rahul Jain	Rahul Jain	Rahul Jain	05:56
6.	"Nahi Nahi"		Shamir Tandon	Alisha Pisa, Alisha Batth	03:38
7.	"Kuch Is Tarah"	Rahul Bhatt, Rajeev Jhaveri	Rahul Bhatt	Divyam	05:36
8.	"Kya Kasak"			Sonu Kakkar	05:06
9.	"Mujhme Kabhi"		Ranjit Barot	Shalmali Kholgade	03:18
10.	"Look Look (Fever)"			Ash King	03:01
11.	"D'accords"			Onésia Rithner, Elena Lucciarini	04:17
12.	"Carried Away"			Onésia Rithner	03:14
13.	"Mile Ho Tum (Reprise)"	Tony Kakkar	Tony Kakkar	Neha Kakkar, Tony Kakkar	04:24
14.	"Teri Yaad (Unplugged)"	Rahul Jain	Rahul Jain	Rahul Jain	04:34
15.	"Dil Ashkon Mein"		Tony Kakkar	Sonu Kakkar, Tony Kakkar	04:32
Total length:					65:55
