= Amit Bose =

Indian filmmaker (1930–2019)

- Born: 26 February 1930; Jamshedpur, Bihar, Bengal Presidency, British India
- Died: 13 December 2019 (aged 89)
- Education: Visva-Bharati University
- Occupation: filmmaker
- Spouse: Monica
- Mother: Meera Devi

Amit Bose (26 February 1930 – 13 December 2019) was an Indian filmmaker, film director and editor, who directed all-time classics like Abhilasha (1968) and, as an Editor, worked on movies like Madhumati (1958), Sujata (1959), Parakh (1960), Usne Kaha Tha (1960), Kabuliwala (1961), Prem Patra (1962), Bandini (1963) and Shakespeare Wallah (1965). He worked as Chief Film Editor for Bimal Roy and with several other directors including Sanjay Khan.

== Early life ==
Bose was born in Jamshedpur/Bihar, India. His grandfather was the geologist Pramatha Nath Bose, who discovered rich iron ores, that made the Empire of J.R.D. Tata possible, which today belong to the Tata Group. Eminent economic historian and civil servant Romesh Chunder Dutt was his great grandfather. Dutt's daughter Kamala Dutt Bose, a renowned educator who founded the "Kamala Girls School" at Ballygunge was married to Pramatha Nath Bose and was his grandmother. His mother Meera Devi (born Sharma) was a Bengali actress. After her first marriage ended in divorce, she married the classical singer and actor Pahari Sanyal), who was like a father to Bose. Amit's name was given by Rabindranath Tagore, who was a cousin of Bose's mother in Kolkata.

== First steps in filmmaking ==
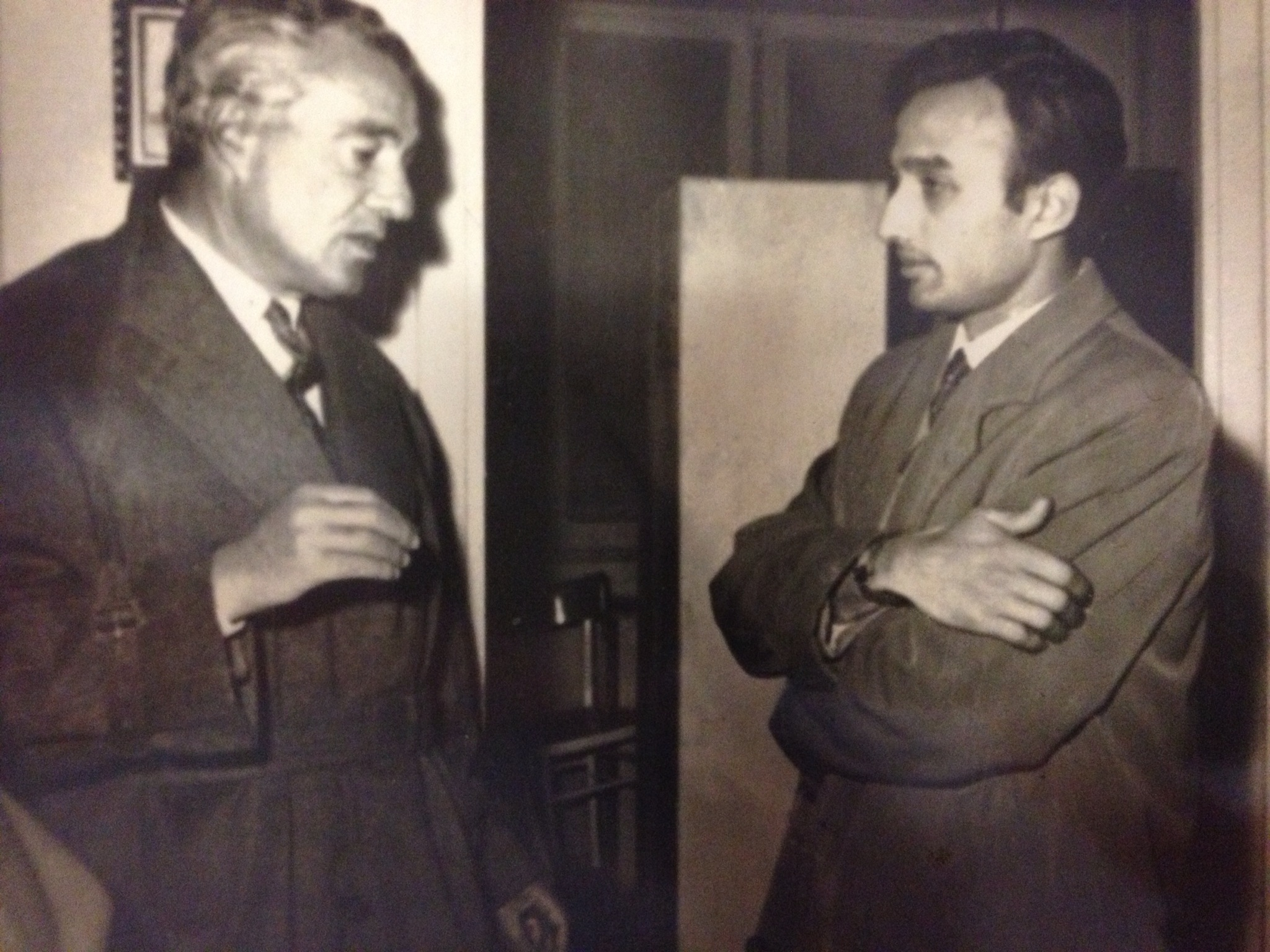
Bose with Vittorio De Sica on the set of "Il Tetto" ("The Roof") in Rome (1954/55).

As a child Bose was a student in Rabindranath Tagore's open-air institution Visva Bharati in Bolpur, Santiniketan. As a young man he took his first steps in the film industry in 1946 in Kolkata. He worked as an assistant to the film director Nimai Ghosh during the making of Chinna Mul ("Broken Branch" - a movie reflecting the up-rooting of the nation during the Great Famine). This film won several awards, both in India and abroad. It is still hailed as one of the great classics of Indian Cinema. Bose then went to Mumbai and worked as an assistant to the Director Phani Majumdar at Bombay Talkies Studios in Malad, in 1947. He also appeared in a bit-part in Majumdar's film Tamasha, which starred the Great Indian Screen Heroine of all time, Meena Kumari.

In 1952, Bose went to England, where he did an apprenticeship at Pinewood Studios and A.B. Pathé.

In 1953 he directed and performed in Sharat Chandra Chatterji's classic novel, Devdas, as Devdas on stage (in English, translated by Monica Sen).

During the next few years he did his diploma in film direction, screenplay writing and film editing at Centro Sperimentale di Cinematografia in Rome, Italy. During that period in Rome he also was an apprentice assistant to Luigi Zampa (during the making of Ragazze d'oggi / "Girls of Today", 1955), Vittorio De Sica (Stazione Termini / "Terminal Station", 1953 & Il Tetto / "The Roof", 1956) and Mario Soldati (Guerra e Pace / "War And Peace", 1956).

== Life and work ==
On his return to India, and after his marriage in Kolkata in September 1957, Bose settled in Mumbai, where he worked as the Chief Film Editor for Bimal Roy. He edited films like Madhumati (1958, the shorter English version for entry to the American Oscars), Sujata (1959), Parakh (1960), Usne Kaha Tha (1960), Kabuliwala (1961), Prem Patra (1962) and Bandini (1963), which he left before completion, because of an opportunity to direct a Children's Film, for which he was awarded the Best Director Award in the same year.

In India, he worked with directors from Bimal Roy to Sanjay Khan, Krishna Shah, Firoze Khan, Kewal Kashyap and many others, knowing actors like Sunil Dutt, Nutan, Sadhana, Meena Kumari, Shashi Kapoor, Raaj Kumar, Felicity Kendal, Rex Harrison, John Saxon, Sulochana, Kamini Kaushal, Dharmendra and Rehman closely.

Abroad he worked in the United Kingdom, United States, Italy, France, Germany, Cyprus, Mauritius and Lebanon, amongst many other countries. He directed and/or edited more than thirty feature films around the world, working with such prestigious directors as Vittorio De Sica, Luigi Zampa, Franco Zeffirelli, Louis Malle, James Ivory and many other well known Filmmakers around the world.

He also directed the children's film Five Puppets (Panch Puthliyan) for the Children's Film Society India, for which he was awarded best Director by the President of India, Sarvepalli Radhakrishnan, in 1964.

Among many other feature films, Bose edited a documentary on the Chinese invasion of India, produced by the Films Division in Mumbai, that took place in 1961/1962.

His credits include movies like Chori Chori (1956), Godaan (1963), Kaajal (1965, as Ghost Director and Editor, winner of over 40 awards), Abhilasha (1968), At Five Past Five (1969) (a play about the assassination of Mahatma Gandhi), Chandi Sona (1977) and The Courtesans of Bombay (1983).

Bose taught film technology in the Film Institute in Pune, India. He introduced and helped many unknown actors to stardom and more than 20 editors, from assistantship to full editorship. He helped young talents grow, by telling them all his secrets, as De Sica once upon a time told him.

Bose was retired and lived with his wife Monica in London, United Kingdom. In his spare time, he worked, as a volunteer, at the local Association for the Blind. His daughters Roma and Papri-Tara are settled with their families in Germany and England. He has five grandchildren, including television producer Simone Thorogood.

== Selected works ==
| Picture/Sound/Music Editor | Year/Country | Production Notes |
|---|---|---|
| Shakespeare Wallah | 1965/US | Merchant Ivory Production, that won acclaim all over Europe and America. |
| Shalimar | 1978/India/US | Directed by Krishna Shah. |
| Cinema Cinema | 1979/India | Directed by Krishna Shah. |
| In Search of God | 1981/Cyprus | Directed by Evangelos Ioannidis. |
| Gathering Storm | 1982/UK | Channel 4 production. |
| The Courtesans of Bombay | 1983/UK | Merchant Ivory TV-Production. |
| American Drive-In | 1985/US | Directed by Krishna Shah. |
| Dabbawallahs | 1985/UK | Channel 4 production. |
| Street Musicians Of Bombay | 1994/UK | Merchant Ivory Production. |

| Dubbing/Sound Editor | Year/Country | Production Notes |
|---|---|---|
| Summer of the Falcon | 1981/US | AKA Lovespell. |
| Anna Ballerina (Series) | 1987/Germany | German TV series. |
| Anna Ballerina (Movie) | 1988/Germany | Movie based on the series. |
| Young Toscanini | 1988/Italy/France | Franco Zeffirelli production. |
| Milou en mai | 1990/France/Italy | Louis Malle production. |

Bose was specialized in dubbing films from different languages to English and vice versa. To name a few, the following is a short list:

| Dubbing | Year/Country | Dubbing Languages | Production Notes |
|---|---|---|---|
| Diva | 1981/Italy/France | French/English | A film by Jean-Jacques Beineix. |
| Summer of the Falcon | 1981/US | German/English/German | AKA Lovespell. Featuring Richard Burton. |
| The Children of Noisy Village | 1986/Sweden | Dutch/English | Written by Astrid Lindgren. |
| A Boy from Calabria | 1987/Italy/France | Italian/English | A film by Luigi Comencini. |
| Anna Ballerina (Series) | 1987/Germany | German/English/German | German TV series. |
| Anna Ballerina (Movie) | 1988/Germany | German/English/German | Movie based on the series. |
| Franco Zeffirelli's Young Toscanini | 1988/Italy/France | English/Italian/English | Featuring Elizabeth Taylor and Sophie Ward. |
| Eurocops | 1988/Spain/Italy/France/Germany/ UK/Austria/Switzerland | English/French/Italian/ Spanish/German | TV series 1988–1993. Featuring Heiner Lauterbach. |
| The Year Of The Black Butterflies | 1989/Germany | German/English | N/A. |
| African Timber | 1989/Germany/France | English/English | Featuring Heiner Lauterbach. |
| Peter in Magicland | 1990/Germany | German/English/German | Full length Animation film. |
| Louis Malle's Milou en mai | 1990/France/Italy | French/English | US Title: May Fools |
