= Jhanak Shukla =

Indian former child actress

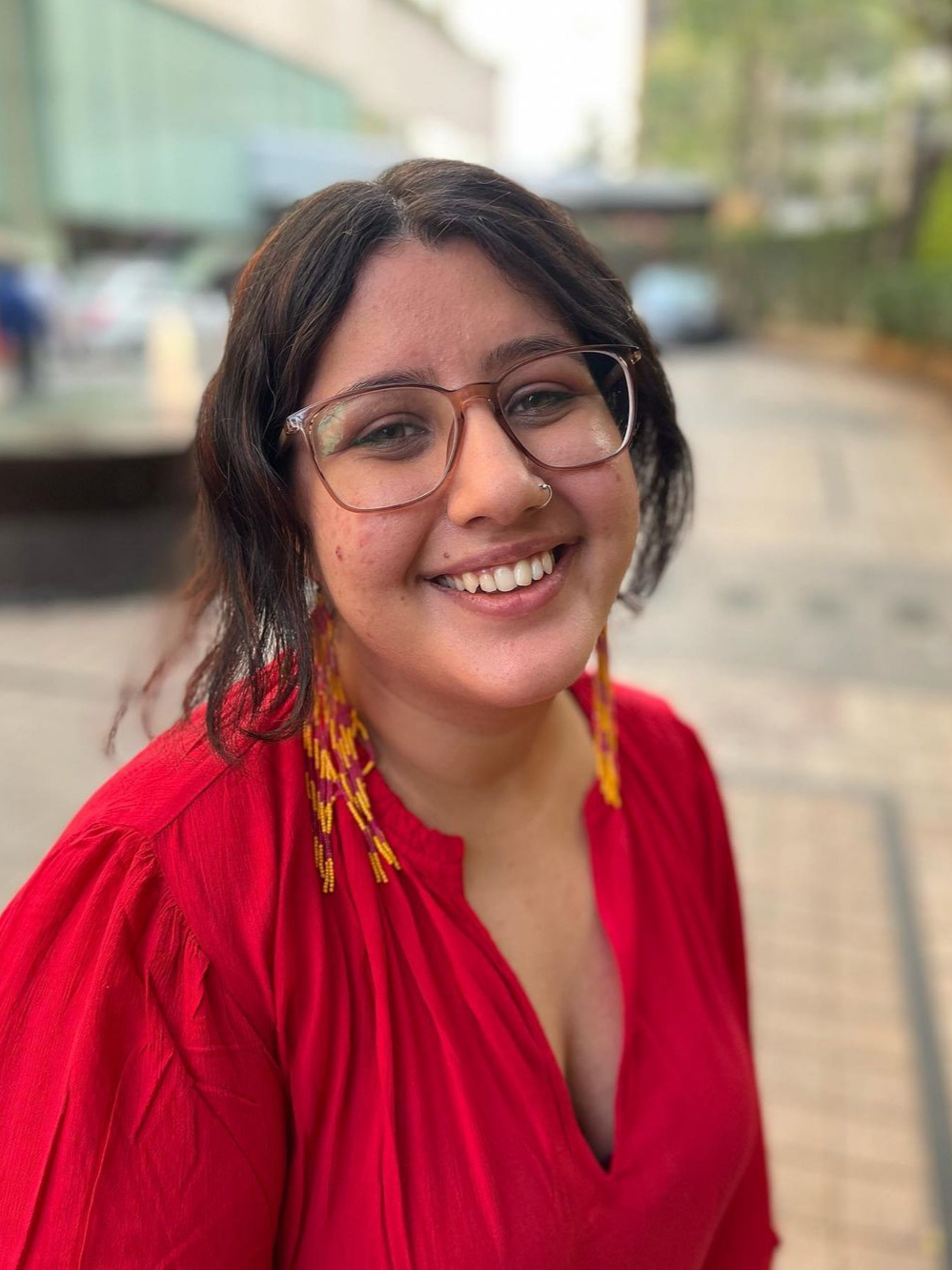
- Born: 24 January 1996 (age 30); India
- Occupation: Actress
- Years active: 2000–2006; 2012
- Mother: Supriya Shukla

Jhanak Shukla is an Indian former child actress.

== Early life and education ==
Shukla is the daughter of documentary filmmaker Haril Shukla and actress Supriya Shukla. Jhanak has completed her MA in archaeology from Deccan College Post-Graduate and Research Institute.

== Career ==
Shukla's greatest success to date is her character 'Gia Kapoor' in the Bollywood movie Kal Ho Na Ho, alongside Shahrukh Khan, Saif Ali Khan and Preity Zinta, where she plays the adopted daughter of Jenny Kapur, played by Jaya Bachchan.

In 2006, she starred with Rajit Kapoor, Konkona Sen Sharma and Irrfan Khan in the movie Deadline: Sirf 24 Ghante as the kidnapped daughter 'Anishka Goenka'.

Jhanak also played a part in the Hollywood movie, One Night with the King.

She also modeled for several advertisements like for 'ICICI' and a music video with Parikrama. She played the lead role in StarPlus series Karishma Kaa Karishma (Remake of Small Wonder) and been a part of Son Pari. She also featured in series Hatim as little Jasmine acted in Gumrah a reality based crime thriller and the Malayalam serial Aalipazham meaning the hailstone.

She had been signed for a pivotal role in Sanjay Leela Bhansali's movie Black. However, she opted out since the dates would clash with Karishma Ka Karishma.

== Filmography ==
=== Films ===
List of Jhanak Shukla film credits
Year	Title	Role
2003	Kal Ho Naa Ho	Gia Kapoor
2006	Deadline: Sirf 24 Ghante	Anishka Goenka
2006	One Night with the King	

=== Television ===
List of Jhanak Shukla film credits
Year	Title	Role	Notes
2000–2004	Son Pari	Princy	
2002	Aalipazham		
2003–2004	Karishma Kaa Karishma	Karishma	
2003–2004	Hatim	Little Jasmine	
2012	Gumrah		
