= Akhil Mishra =

Indian actor (1956–2023)

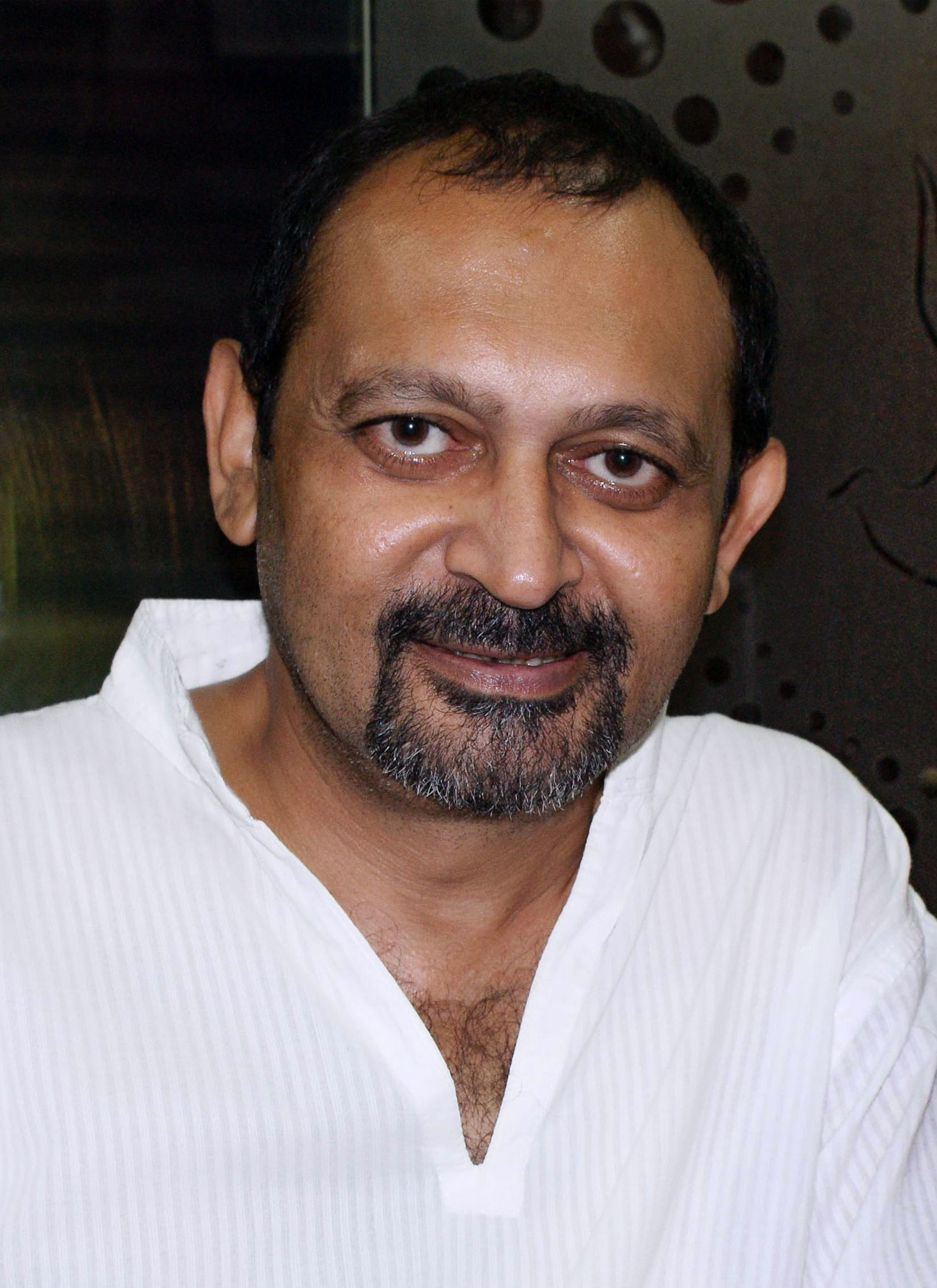
- Born: 22 July 1956; Kanpur, Uttar Pradesh, India
- Died: 20 September 2023 (aged 67) at home in Mira Road Thane District
- Occupation: Actor
- Years active: 1983–2023
- Spouse(s): Manju Mishra (m. 1983–1997) Suzanne Bernert (m. 2009–2023)

Akhil Mishra (22 July 1956 – 20 September 2023) was an Indian film and television actor who has worked in films such as Hazaaron Khwaishein Aisi, Gandhi, My Father and television serials such as Pradhanmantri. He was working in the serial Do Dil Bandhe Ek Dori Se. He became famous by doing the cameo role of Librarian Dubey in 3 Idiots and playing the role of Umed Singh Bundela in Uttaran. He also acted in Bhopal: A Prayer for Rain.

== Personal life ==
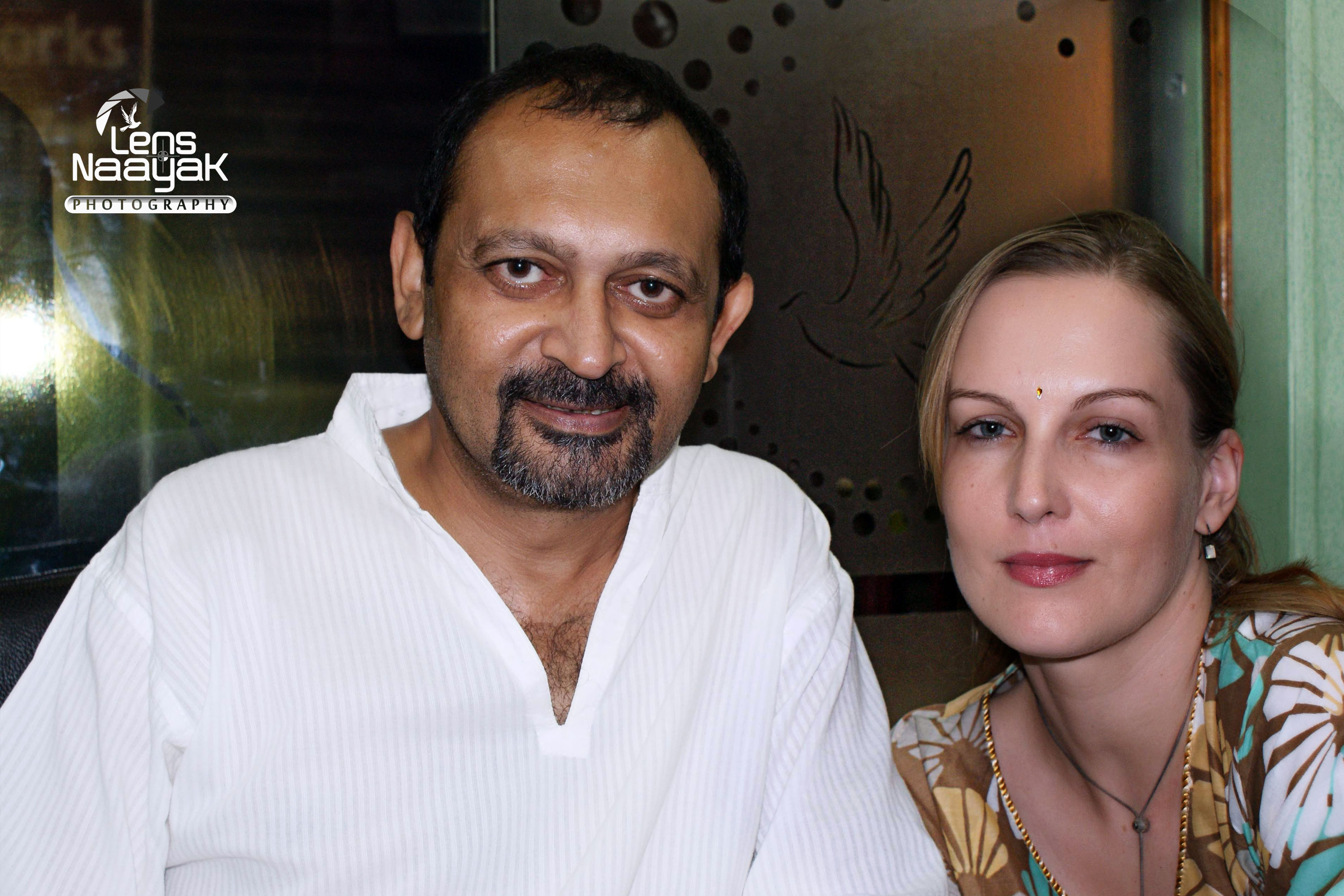
Akhil with his wife Suzanne Bernert

Akhil Mishra was born in Kanpur, Uttar Pradesh on 22 July 1956. He married Manju Mishra in 1983 who had acted with him in his first feature film Dhat Tere...Ki in 1983 and a serial Grihalakshmi Ka Jinn. Manju died in 1997. Mishra was doing Dhat Tere...Ki as writer, producer and actor.

Mishra later married German actress Suzanne Bernert on 3 February 2009. They married again in a traditional way on 30 September 2011. He had worked with Suzanne in movie Kram and serial Mera Dil Dewaana (Doordarshan) and on stage. In 2019 they shot a Short Film called "Majnu ki Juliet", which Mishra wrote, acted in and directed it.

Mishra's mother's name was Arundhati Mishra; she died October 2012.

=== Death ===
Akhil Mishra died from a fall in his kitchen, on 20 September 2023, at the age of 67. The actor had been unwell for some time due to blood pressure-related issues.

== Filmography ==
- Majnu ki Juliet as Riksha Walla, written and directed by Akhil Mishra. Released on YouTube Six Sigma Films (Source IMDB.com.)
- 3 Idiots as Librarian Dubey
- Hazaaron Khwaishein Aisi
- Pratha movie Principal Sarang, movie by Raja Bundela release in 2002
- Bhopal: A Prayer for Rain
- Mere Dost Picture Abhi Baki Hai
- Radio (2009 film)
- Blue Oranges as Mr. Goel
- Don
- Kram as Vinayak Mathur
- Well Done Abba as Arun Mishra - Tahsildar
- Gandhi, My Father
- Is Raat Ki Subah Nahin as the Neighbour
- Shikhar (film)
- Calcutta Mail
- Kareeb
- Dhat Tere...Ki (1983) as Pitamber/Pattu
- Kamla Ki Maut (1989)
- Hamari Shaadi (1990)

== Television ==
- Bhanwar as Ahmed episodic Lead (2015)
- Yam Hain Hum as Minister
- Pradhanmantri as Lal Bahadur Shastri
- The Adventures of Hatim
- Do Dil Bandhe Ek Dori Se
- Uttaran as Umed Singh-Bundela (2009-2013)
- Udaan Cameo of Teacher
- R. K. Laxman Ki Duniya Cameo as guest who rhymes everything he says (Feb. 2012)
- Mera Dil Dewaana Psychotic Chachha
- Pardes Mein Mila Koi Apna as Nirupama's father
- Hatim_ as Butler in 2004 https://www.imdb.com/title/tt5201864/
- Princess Dollie Aur Uska Magic Bag as the mysterious King's henchman
- Kadam:Breast Cancer as Eternal Father
- Reporter Intelligence Officer
- C.I.D. as Business Man
- Sea Hawks (TV series) as Navy Officer and Father Figure to Commandant Preet
- Shrimaan Shrimati as Fantush (Ad Film Director)
- Grihalakshmi Ka Jinn as IAS Officer
- Bharat Ek Khoj (1988)
- Rajani (TV series)
