= Shalimar (1978 film) =

Shalimar Raiders of the Sacred Stone
- India theatrical release poster
- Directed by: Krishna Shah
- Screenplay by: Krishna Shah
- Dialogues by: Krishna Shah (English); Kader Khan (Hindi)
- Story by: Stanford Sherman; Krishna Shah
- Based on: The Vulture Is a Patient Bird by James Hadley Chase
- Produced by: Suresh Shah
- Starring: Dharmendra; Zeenat Aman; Sir Rex Harrison; John Saxon; Sylvia Miles; Shammi Kapoor; O. P. Ralhan; Clyde Chai-Fa
- Cinematography: Harvey Genkins
- Edited by: Amit Bose (Hindi); Teddy Darvas (English)
- Music by: R. D. Burman
- Production company: Laxmi-Judson Productions
- Distributed by: India: Eros International; United States: Laxmi-Judson Productions
- Release date: 8 December 1978
- Countries: India; United States
- Languages: Hindi; English
- Budget: US$4 million or ₹3.6 crore (equivalent to ₹108 crore or US$11 million in 2026)

Shalimar (English: Raiders of the Sacred Stone) is a 1978 bilingual Indo-American film, written and directed by Krishna Shah. The film stars Dharmendra, Zeenat Aman and Sir Rex Harrison, alongside John Saxon, Sylvia Miles, Shammi Kapoor and O. P. Ralhan.

This was the only Bollywood film that Oscar award winning English actor Sir Rex Harrison and American actors John Saxon and Sylvia Miles appeared in. This was the last time that Mohammed Rafi's voice was picturized on Shammi Kapoor. Its English version is known as Raiders of the Sacred Stone. Rex Harrison's voice was dubbed by Kader Khan in the Hindi version and Dharmendra‘s voice was dubbed in the English version. The plot is inspired by the novel The Vulture is a Patient Bird by James Hadley Chase, with Dharmendra playing the lead role based on Max Kahlenberg, the central character of the book. The film's script was novelized by Manohar Malgonkar. Shalimar was the most expensive movie ever made in India at that point. The English version of the movie was released in the United States titled as the Raiders of the Sacred Stone. It has been marketed on DVD under the name The Deadly Thief.

Adjusted to the inflation, it was the most expensive Hindi film made in India till that point of time.

== Plot ==
On the run from his creditors, small time thief S.S. Kumar stumbles upon a private invitation card addressed to Raja Bahadur Singh for a gathering on the island of Sir John Locksley. Kumar steals the invitation card after witnessing the Raja get shot. Kumar takes the Raja to a hospital and disguises himself as the Raja's son, Bahadur Singh Jr., to gain entry to the exclusive event.

When he arrives, Kumar finds that the other invitees are also notorious criminals and thieves, including a mute and disabled man named Colonel Columbus, an acrobat named Countess Sylvia Rasmussen, a follower of all world religions named Dr. Dubari, and a womanizer named K.P.W. Iyengar (also known as Romeo). His disguise does not fool anyone, especially his former sweetheart and fiancée, Sheila Enders, who now works as a nurse for Sir John.

Although Kumar's cover is blown, Sir John permits him to stay. Sheila informs everyone that Sir John is dying from cancer. The reason John has invited the expert thieves is to find a successor to the highly valuable Shalimar ruby, which is worth 135 crores of rupees. He feels that the person who will be able to steal the gem will be its most worthy successor. The gem is located in a highly secure, alarmed room within his palace, guarded by armed men and surrounded by mines. The challenge has high stakes: whoever fails to steal the gem will be killed by the security system.

Colonel Columbus is the first one to die while trying to steal the Shalimar. Next, Countess Rasmussen tries to steal the gem but is also killed in the process. Dr. Dubari also supposedly dies while trying to steal the Shalimar. Romeo withdraws from the competition but is killed by Sir John. It is then that Sir John reveals his true motive. He had faked his illness and staged the entire game in order to kill those expert thieves and remove all potential competitors of the Shalimar.

Kumar and Sheila succeed in stealing the Shalimar and, after an intense chase involving all of Sir John's guards, they manage to escape from the island. In the meantime, Dr. Dubari, who had actually faked his death, instigates the local tribe to revolt against Sir John and ultimately kills him. It is then revealed that Kumar is not a thief but a CBI officer who was on a special mission to retrieve the stolen gem. The story concludes with Kumar and Sheila getting married.

== Release ==
The film was released in two versions; Hindi and in English (titled as Raiders of the Sacred Stone) for the USA release.

== Cast ==
- Dharmendra as S. S. Kumar
- Zeenat Aman as Sheila Enders – Kumar's girlfriend, later wife
- Sir Rex Harrison as Sir John Locksley
- John Saxon as Colonel Columbus
- Sylvia Miles as Countess Rasmussen
- Shammi Kapoor as Dr. Dubari
- O. P. Ralhan as K.P.W. Iyengar (Romeo)
- Clyde Chai-Fa as Dogro
- Prem Nath as Raja Bahadur Singh
- Shreeram Lagoo as Tolaram
- Aruna Irani as Dance Teacher
- M. B. Shetty as Tribal Chief
- Jayamalini as tribal dancer

== Soundtrack ==
The music of this movie was composed by R. D. Burman while Anand Bakshi penned the lyrics of the songs. "Hum Bewafaa Hargiz Na The" sung by Kishore Kumar is an evergreen song of this album.

#	Title	Singer(s)
1	"Hum Bewafaa Hargiz Na The (I)"	Kishore Kumar
2	"Hum Bewafaa Hargiz Na The (II)"	Kishore Kumar
3	"Aaina Wohi Rehta Hai"	Lata Mangeshkar
4	"Mera Pyaar Shalimar"	Asha Bhosle
5	"Naag Devta"	Mohammed Rafi
6	"One Two Cha Cha"	Usha Uthup

The soundtrack was featured in the book, 1001 Albums You Must Hear Before You Die.

== Awards ==
26th Filmfare Awards:

Nominated

- Best Music Director – R. D. Burman
- Best Male Playback Singer – Kishore Kumar for "Hum Bewafaa"
- Best Female Playback Singer – Usha Uthup for "One Two Cha Cha Cha"

== See also ==
Other films directed by Krishna Shah:

- Rivals
- The River Niger
- Hard Rock Zombies
- American Drive-In
