= Radio (2009 film) =

2009 Indian film by Isshaan Trivedi

- Directed by: Ishan Trivedi
- Produced by: Ravi Agrawal
- Starring: Himesh Reshammiya; Sonal Sehgal; Shenaz Treasurywala; Zakir Hussain; Rajesh Khattar; Pep Figueiredo; Paresh Rawal
- Cinematography: Attar Singh Saini
- Music by: Songs: Himesh Reshammiya; Background Score: Bapi–Tutul
- Distributed by: T-Series
- Release date: 4 December 2009
- Running time: 105 minutes
- Country: India
- Language: Hindi

Radio is a 2009 Indian comedy-drama film starring Himesh Reshammiya, Shenaz Treasurywala and Sonal Sehgal in the lead roles. The film is directed by Isshaan Trivedi. The movie was released on 4 December 2009. Reshammiya has received praise for his portrayal of Vivan Shah.

== Plot ==
Vivan is a successful RJ on a popular radio channel in Mumbai. He has acquired everything in life, but his marriage is unsuccessful. He is going through a divorce even though he does not want it because his wife thinks they are incompatible, and she is unhappy. In their hearts, Vivan and Pooja don't want the divorce, but the fast pace of life and busy schedules interfere with her emotional balance.

Enters Shanaya, who is like a ray of sunshine in Vivan's insipid life. Initially, he is reluctant to get close to Shanaya but slowly finds himself happy to be around her. However, we see that his ex, Pooja, wants Vivan back in her life. When she lets him know that she wants him back, he interrupts her and lets her know that he wants to be with Shanaya. Pooja can also sense his love for Shanaya. She becomes the catalyst in his realization that he, in fact, loves Shanaya. Vivan also tries to get close to Shanaya's family. Although Pooja still has a soft spot for Vivan and cares for him, she realizes that he wants to spend his life with Shanaya.

Who will eventually reign in his heart? Will he take the step to make his vows with Shanaya?

== Cast ==
- Himesh Reshammiya as RJ Vivan Shah
- Sonal Sehgal as Puja Talwar
- Shenaz Treasurywala as Shanaya Dhingra
- Zakir Hussain as Shanaya's Dad
- Paresh Rawal as Jhandu Lal Tyagi
- Pep Figueiredo as Rahul
- Urvashi Yadav as Peps
- Megha Narkar as Pooja's Friend
- Himani Shivpuri as Shanaya's Boss at Food Court
- Megha Chatterjee
- Akhil Mishra
- Rajesh Khattar as RJ Vivan Shah's Boss

== Critical reception ==
Though the film was panned by many critics, Himesh Reshammiya got good reviews for his acting.

Taran Adarsh wrote," Himesh Reshammiya has grown as an actor that reflects in certain difficult moments of the film."

Nikhat Kazmi of Times of India wrote, "Himesh Reshammiya tries to reinvent himself. Himesh Reshammiya as RJ Vivan Shah, does seem to have found a better groove. In fact, this new clean, casual avatar of his does seem to work".

== Music ==
All music composed by Himesh Reshammiya with lyrics by Subrat Sinha. The music of the film opened to positive reviews, with Bollywoodhungama.com giving it 4 stars out of 5. The album features couple of songs performed by musicians like Kailash Kher, Rekha Bhardwaj.

Radio

Studio album by Himesh Reshammiya
- Released: August 2009
- Recorded: August 2009
- Venue: Mumbai
- Genre: Film soundtrack
- Length: 56:29
- Label: T-Series
- Producers: Ravi Agrawal (Film Producer); Himesh Reshammiya

Himesh Reshammiya chronology
Karzzzz (2008)	Radio (2009)	Milenge Milenge (2010)

=== Track list ===
Song	Singer(s)	Duration
"Mann Ka Radio"	Himesh Reshammiya	04:22
"Zindagi Jaise Ek Radio"	Himesh Reshammiya and Aditi Singh Sharma	04:48
"Janeman"	Himesh Reshammiya and Shreya Ghoshal	04:04
"Piya Jaise Ladoo Motichur Wale"	Himesh Reshammiya and Rekha Bhardwaj	05:34
"Damadji Angana Hai Padhare"	Himesh Reshammiya and Kailash Kher	06:31
"Koi Na Koi Chahe"	Himesh Reshammiya and Shreya Ghoshal	04:20
"Teri Meri Dosti Ka Aasman "	Himesh Reshammiya and Shreya Ghoshal	05:44
"Shaam Ho Chali Hai"	Himesh Reshammiya and Shreya Ghoshal	04:21
"Rafa Dafa Kiya Nahin Jaaye"	Himesh Reshammiya	02:53

Three remixes are also included in the album. 3 songs were remixed by Dj Akbar Sami

1. Mann Ka Radio – Himesh Reshammiya
2. Zindagi Jaise Ek Radio – Himesh Reshammiya
3. Piya Jaise Ladoo Motichur Wale – Himesh Reshammiya and Rekha Bhardwaj
