= Son Pari =

Indian children's fantasy adventure television series

- A promotional image of the series
- Genre: Fantasy; Adventure
- Starring: Tanvi Hegde; Mrinal Kulkarni; Ashok Lokhande; Vivek Mushran; Shashikala
- Opening theme: 'Son Pari Aayi' by Shreya Ghoshal
- Country of origin: India
- Original language: Hindi
- No. of episodes: 268

Production
- Producers: Neena Gupta; Anupam K Kalidhar
- Production location: Mumbai
- Running time: 21 minutes
- Production company: Taurus Video

Original release
- Network: StarPlus
- Release: 23 November 2000 – 1 March 2006

Son Pari (English: Golden Fairy) is an Indian children's fantasy adventure television series which aired from 2000 to 2006 on StarPlus. The series follows the story of Fruity, a young girl who receives a magical ball that, when rubbed, summons a fairy named Son Pari and her friend Altu.

== Plot ==
Bunty, a scientist's apprentice, catches a dove to give it to his boss to use in an experiment. Bunty and the scientist want to capture Son Pari and use her to become rich by showing her off to the world. Fruity set the dove free, not knowing that the bird was Son Pari (Golden Fairy), who often comes to Earth with the permission of the fairy queen, called Pari Ma (Fairy Mother).

Fruity's mother died long ago. Fruity goes to the terrace to look at the stars, as she believes her mother is one of them. One night Son Pari comes to her and offers her friendship in return for the assistance Fruity once gave her. This starts the story of their strange friendship. Son Pari and Altu start meeting Fruity regularly and have many adventures. They help her get rid of Ruby, a woman who wants to marry Fruity's father, Rohit, for his money. Although Ruby's brother helps Ruby, Son Pari and Altu, make sure they don't succeed. Later, Son Pari realizes that Fruity is in great danger, for it is written in the prophecies that Fruity will kill Kali Pari (Dark Fairy), who is the main villain of Season 2. For a short while, Son Pari makes Tooty, a fairy who is Fruity's look-alike, take care of Fruity and protects her from Kaali Pari.

Much later, a new character, Princy, comes into the picture, who will be able to see Son Pari and Altu despite them being invisible to everyone. The series contains multiple subplots and finally, Fruity will be able to kill Kaali Pari and thus the darkness ends.

== Cast ==
Actor	Character
Tanvi Hegde	Fruity and Tooty
Mrinal Dev-Kulkarni	Sonpari/Dr.Sonali Tripathi/Kaalipari in 2 episodes
Ashok Lokhande	Altamash/altu
Vivek Mushran	Rohit(fruity's father)
Upasana Singh	Kaali Pari/Cruella, Sonali Tripathi Fake Mother, Sonpari in 2 episodes
Deepshikha Nagpal	Rooby,Witch Medusaa,Cruella in 3 episodes
Sunila Karambelkar	Naashikaa, Rohit's Assistant
Kaivalya Chheda	Jeff D'Souza(fruity's best friend)
Benazir Shaikh	Twinkle, Fruity's Friend
Aditya Surtey	Appy
Jhanak Shukla	Princy
Shashikala	Daadi(fruity's grandmother)
Anita Kanwal	Mrs. Dhillon
Harsh Khurana	Deepak
Tina Parekh	Jennifer
Pratibha	Teressa
Yashodhan Bal	Jennifer's father
Akul Tripathi	Bunty
Yahsraj Khushwaha	Yash, Fruity's friend
Zoya Afroz	Dimple,Fruity's Friend
Zohaib Ahmed	Zack/Dimple cousin
Aditya Kapadia	Anokha Abijith
Natasha Sinha	Pari Maa
Archisha Mukherjee	Tina, Fruity's bully in boarding school
Swati Patra	Genius, Fruity's friend
Manasi Salvi	Chulbuli 229
Anisha Hinduja	Hakim's Magical Book Women
Sri Vallabh Vyas	Bindhula, tantric priest, (Episodes 144–146)
Sonal Pendse	Janglika (Episodes 117–118)

== Broadcasting ==
Son Pari originally aired on Star Plus channel from 23 November 2000 and 1 October 2004. Re-runs of the show also aired on Star Utsav, STAR One and Disney Channel India.
