= Deadline: Sirf 24 Ghante =

- Directed by: Tanveer Khan
- Written by: Dilip Shukla
- Produced by: Ravi Agrawal
- Starring: Konkona Sen Sharma; Rajit Kapur; Irrfan Khan; Sandhya Mridul
- Cinematography: Baba Azmi
- Edited by: Sanjay Shankla
- Music by: Raju Rao
- Distributed by: Percept Picture Company
- Release date: 10 November 2006
- Country: India
- Language: Hindi

Deadline: Sirf 24 Ghante (transl. Deadline: Just 24 Hours) is a 2006 Indian Hindi-language suspense thriller film directed by Tanveer Khan, starring Konkona Sen Sharma, Irfan Khan and Rajit Kapur in the lead roles. The film is an adaptation of the Charlize Theron-Kevin Bacon film Trapped, which was based on the Greg Iles novel 24 Hours.

== Plot ==
Heart surgeon Dr. Viren Goenka (Rajit Kapur), his wife Sanjana (Konkona Sen Sharma), and their seven-year-old daughter Anishka (Jhanak Shukla) live in Mumbai. Their joys have just multiplied with Viren being honoured with a prestigious award for his contribution to the medical world.

Viren is all set to visit New Delhi to receive this award. He promises to celebrate his daughter's birthday once he returns. But fate has something else planned for Viren and his family: Anishka is kidnapped under Sanjana's nose. She is startled by the presence of a creepy man named Krish (Irfan Khan) in her house. Krish tells her that Anishka will be fine as long as Sanjana and Dr. Goenka follow his instructions.

While Krish keeps Sanjana in the house, his partner Roohi (Sandhya Mridul) keeps Viren confined in his hotel room, and their third associate Kabir (Zakir Hussain) holds Anishka at a remote location. The kidnappers keep strict half-hour checks with each other by cell phones and set the ransom amount at Rs. 3 crores.

It doesn't take much for Viren and Sanjana to realise that abiding by the kidnappers' terms is the best thing that they can do to save their daughter's life. Viren mortgages everything possible, including his dream hospital project and his house, and manages to collect Rs. 3 crores within the 24-hour deadline given to him by the kidnappers.

But the kidnappers flee without any signs of their daughter and take the ransom money as well. Sanjana and Viren are uncertain about what could have happened and fear for the life of their beloved daughter. Viren wants his daughter back at any cost and thus exploits all his sources. The police search for clues, but there's no breakthrough.

Finally, Sanjana and Viren realise that the kidnappers' motive is not ransom but revenge. In the end, the kidnappers return their daughter and all the money. The reason they kidnapped Viren's daughter was to teach him the lesson that the medical profession is a noble one and that he had been extremely money-minded in treating some of his patients.

== Cast ==
- Konkona Sen Sharma as Sanjana Goenka
- Irfan Khan as Krish Vaidya
- Rajit Kapur as Dr. Viren Goenka
- Sandhya Mridul as Roohi Vaidya
- Jhanak Shukla as Anishka Goenka
- Zakir Hussain as Kabir
- Rajeev Verma as Police Commissioner Rana
- Preiti as Dia
- Purnima Suryawanshi as Zee News TV anchor
- Nasiruddin Khan as Sinha
- Manohar Pandit as Mehra
