= Ankita Makwana =

Swiss actress and model

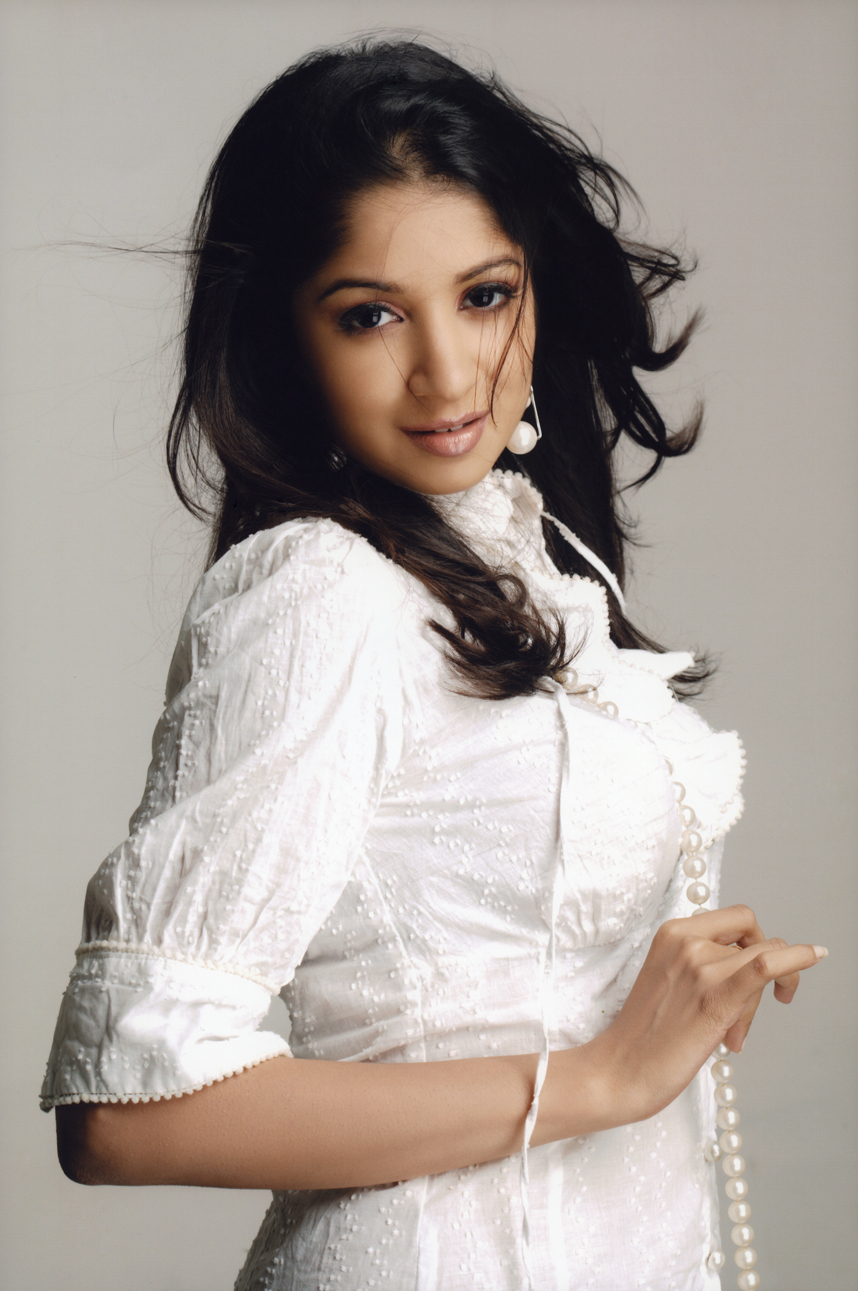
- Born: Zürich, Switzerland
- Education: University of St. Gallen
- Occupations: Actress, model, producer, writer, speaker
- Known for: Bollywood actress, TEDx conference speaker

Ankita Makwana is a Swiss actress, film maker and philanthropist. She made her acting debut with the Bollywood thriller film Fever. She is founder of two film production companies, Rebelmango and Am films.

== Early life ==
Makwana is daughter of the Honorary Consul-General of India to Zurich and State of the Vatican City J.H. Makwana. She grew up in Zurich and lived in Geneva, Paris and Mumbai. She studied Bachelor of Arts in Law and Economics at the University of St. Gallen in Switzerland.

== Career ==
In her childhood Makwana hosted one episode of TV Show Euro Zindagi on Zee TV UK. Before acting in movies, she took formal training at the Kishore Namit Kapoor's Acting Lab in Mumbai in 2010. After that she started with small movies and ad films for companies like Ford Ikon or Universal Mobile where she shared screen space with renowned Bollywood actor R. Madhavan. She appeared in a friendly appearance in Sanjay Gadhvi's film Kidnap as Tisha. She has been a cover model for the Swiss women's magazine Annabelle. She has also modelled for 495dm and other brands. She was featured in the WW Who is Who Zurich 2014 magazine, and several other Swiss-German papers as such 20 Minuten and Schweizer Illustrierte. According to the media Makwana is also writing a script for a Bollywood movie which will be produced in Switzerland. In October 2013 Makwana was invited as a motivational speaker at the TEDx conference in Zurich Makwana is also producing, writing, directing and acting in the sitcom Zurich 8001. Zurich 8001 is the first international and English speaking sitcom to be shot entirely in Zurich, Switzerland.. In 2026 Hello Dad, a short film shot in New York released at the Big Apple Film Festival and Makwana alongside director Neha Lohia and co-star Tirlok Malik was honored at Times Square for sustainable filmmaking.

== Charity ==
In 2018 Makwana founded a charity organization the Flying Angel Charity in Zurich, Switzerland, supporting the education of underprivileged children in India. The Flying Angel Charity is a Swiss tax-exempt charitable organization.

== Filmography ==
=== Films ===
Key
†	Denotes films that have not yet been released

Year	Film	Role	Notes
2008	Kidnap	Tisha	Friendly appearance
2015	Fever	Grace Soni	Lead Debut
2016	The Writer	Grace Soni	
2016	Zurich8001	Amisha Shroff	Main lead, Sitcom
2018	Seeds of Terror	Lamia Davis	
2024	Fast Forward	Padme	Guest star
2025	Desi Sherlock Homes	Niharika	
2026	Hello Dad	Sonya Malhotra	Lead
2026	Aktenzeichen XYU	Hila Amiri	Guest Star

=== Music videos ===
Year	Song	Role	Director	Production	Notes	Ref.
2023	"Devi Song"	Inner Darkness	Neha Lohia	Universal Music Group	also Associate Producer	
