= Karishma Kaa Karishma =

Indian Hindi-language television series

- Genre: Science fiction sitcom
- Developed by: Abid Hussain; Aparna Ganesh
- Written by: Raghuvir Shekhavat
- Directed by: Swapna Waghmare Joshi
- Creative director: Vincent Franklin
- Starring: See below
- Theme music composer: Lalit Sen
- Opening theme: "Karishma Kaa Karishma" by
- Country of origin: India
- Original language: Hindi
- No. of seasons: 1
- No. of episodes: 65

Production
- Executive producer: Sushma Kaul
- Producer: Sunil Doshi
- Editor: Sheldon D'souza
- Camera setup: Multi-camera
- Running time: Approx. 24 minutes
- Production company: Alliance Media & Entertainment

Original release
- Network: StarPlus
- Release: 24 January 2003 – 16 April 2004

Karishma Kaa Karishma (English: The Miracle of Karishma) is an Indian television series which is a remake of the 1980s American TV series Small Wonder. The series premiered on StarPlus on 24 January 2003. It is produced by Sunil Doshi of Alliance Media & Entertainment, and starring Jhanak Shukla as the cyber kid Karishma.

== Plot ==
The story revolves around a scientist, Vikram, who designs a very lifelike robot. His goal is to find out if the robot (Karishma) will become more human-like as time goes on. His wife, Sheetal, who is easily influenced by her neighbour Shraddha, suspects Vikram to be having an extramarital affair due to his late work hours. But Vikram reveals the AI robot Karishma to the family and explains he was working on making her, Sheetal accepts Karishma as a daughter. Rahul, Vikram and Sheetal's son, is constantly annoyed by his neighbor, Sweety, who has a crush on him. Vikram and his family are the only ones who know that Karishma is a robot. Their nosy neighbors Shraddha and Paresh interfere in their lives and try to figure out who Karishma really is. This is the premise for a lot of episodes. Every episode, Karishma saves the day by solving the family's problem.

== Cast ==
- Jhanak Shukla as Karishma Vikram Malhotra (A robot)
- Sanjeev Seth as Vikram Malhotra (Rahul and Karishma's father)
- Eva Grover/Tisca Chopra as Sheetal Vikram Malhotra (Rahul and Karishma's mother)
- Mayank Tandon as Rahul Vikram Malhotra
- Bhavana Balsavar as Shraddha Paresh Parekh
- Shweta Prasad as Sweety Paresh Parekh
- Jamnadas Majethia as Paresh Parekh
- Athit Naik as Pintu/ Prince
- Kurush Deboo as Lappu (The Coward Ghost)
- Hansika Motwani as Tina (Sweety's Cousin) Ep 18 (Also appeared as a Chinese Child Robot)
- Daisy Irani as Maasi Ji
- Aditya Kapadia as Rishta (Sweety's American Cousin)
