= Pardes Mein Mila Koi Apna =

- Genre: Drama
- Written by: Jayesh Patil, Dilip Jha, Archita Biswas Jha & Nandini Arora
- Directed by: Glen Barretto, Ankush Mohla & Paresh B Patil
- Country of origin: India
- Original language: Hindi
- No. of episodes: 84

Production
- Producers: Vinta Nanda, Piyush Gupta & Jatin Sethi
- Running time: 24 minutes
- Production companies: Reliance BIG Productions; Diamond Pictures

Original release
- Network: Imagine TV
- Release: 31 January – 27 May 2011

Pardes Mein Mila Koi Apna is an Indian drama that aired on Imagine TV from 31 January 2011 to 27 May 2011.

== Plot ==
‘Pardes Mein Mila Koi Apna’ is a conflicting love story- a story of a romance and a bond between two contrasting individuals, who are forced to get married in the face of unavoidable circumstances.

Nirupama, who belongs to a small village ravaged by drought, is forced to come to Mumbai to save her father who is bordering on insanity. Niru who is motherless had promised herself that she would forever be with her father- and never get married and leave him. Unaware of her destiny, she makes every effort to keep her promise and goes all out, even at the cost of sacrificing her own desires and needs. Hurdles created by her own people, she faces all odds- especially the taunts and ill treatment meted out to her by her own sister who considers them a burden. And when all hope in her life seems to fade away, she then meets a man of her dream Chandu and almost unwittingly, falls in love with him.

Chandu who is a soft romantic at heart- is the sole hope in his family. A good student, his father who is a constable has high hopes from him as his other son has dashed his aspirations for him. Chandu's younger sister is Sonali who is a positive, sensitive and energetic, bubbly girl who is playful and witty with Chandu and helps him and brother Sarje in difficulties. She is also a TV actress who is shown as playing characters in television serials and helps Chandu and Niru's relationship to grow. Chandu is a lovable sweet boy who meets Niru at a nightclub where they both perform and it is here that their love story blossoms. At first Niru fights this love she feels for Chandu, as she does not want to break her promise. Finally when both accept their love for each other, they realize that their love is doomed as Niru's suitor from her basti Albela Suman (who is her sisters devar) and Chandu's brother Sarje are archenemies.

Chandu dies in an accident. Niru is depressed and she discovers that she is pregnant with his child. She becomes scared not knowing what to do. Sarje finds out about Niru's pregnancy and marries (since he loved her anyway). Niru hates Sarje but has no other choice but to marry him. Chandu's family blames Niru for Chandu's death and reprimand Sarje for marrying his brother's 'killer' (they don't know about her pregnancy). At first Niru is indifferent towards Sarje, but sees him change. In the last episode she accepts Sarje.

== Cast ==
- Bhavna Khatri as Nirupama/Niru
- Arjun Bijlani as Chandrakant Bhosle
- Kapil Nirmal as Sarjerao
- Rashmi Pitre as Sonali/Younger Sister
- Akhil Mishra as Nirupama's father
- Atisha Naik as Chandrakant's mother
