= Hatim (TV series) =

2003 TV series

- Also known as: Maaveeran Hatim
- Genre: Action; Adventure; Fantasy television
- Written by: Deepali Junjappa
- Directed by: Amrit Sagar; Shakti Sagar
- Starring: See Below
- Country of origin: India
- Original language: Hindi
- No. of seasons: 1
- No. of episodes: 47

Production
- Executive producer: Jyoti Sagar
- Running time: 45 minutes
- Production company: Sagar Films

Original release
- Network: StarPlus
- Release: 26 December 2003 – 12 November 2004

Hatim is an Indian fantasy television series that aired on StarPlus from 26 December 2003 until 12 November 2004. It has elements of fantasy, drama, action and many other genres. It was directed by Amrit Sagar and is inspired by the arabic story recounting the adventures of Hatim al-Tai of the Tayyi tribe of Arabia.

== Plot ==
In the Middle Ages, Hatim, the newborn son of the emperor of Yemen, is proclaimed to spread the messages of peace and goodness. The son of the Emperor of Jaffar is born at the same time, and a palace resident named Najumi performs black magic to make the baby a servant of evil spirits.

The Emperor of Jaffar decides that it would be better for the world if his newborn son is killed and orders the baby's heart to be burned. Najumi burns a rabbit's heart instead and shows it to the emperor, leading the emperor to believe that his orders have been carried out. Najumi takes the child, names him Dajjal, and teaches him the dark arts.

Twenty years pass. In Yemen, Hatim grows into a kind-hearted and beloved prince. In Jaffar, Dajjal kills his parents and becomes the emperor. Dajjal creates an eternal fire at the top of the palace's tower that grants him dark powers. Najumi explains to Dajjal that Dajjal can become the supreme lord of the world if he is able to capture the forces of goodness. Dajjal can achieve this by marrying Sunena, the princess of Durgapur, who is goodness personified.

Dajjal arrives in Durgapur to ask Sunena for her hand in marriage, but she declines. When Dajjal threatens Sunena's teenage brother Suraj, Suraj slices Dajjal's hand with his sword. Dajjal's hand heals and Dajjal turns Suraj into a stone statue. Dajjal tells Sunena that he will only turn Suraj human again if she accepts his proposal. He gives Sunena seven months to accept the proposition, after which the curse will become permanent.

In Yemen, Hatim's marriage is fixed with Jasmin, the princess of Paristan (Fairyland). Hatim and Jasmin meet for the first time and fall in love. Sunena's lover, Prince Vishal of Janakpur, arrives disguised as a beggar. Vishal pleads with Hatim to help him fight Dajjal. The Emperor of Yemen, Hatim, the Emperor of Paristan and Vishal meet. The Emperor of Paristan reveals that when the forces of goodness created Paristan, a prophecy was made that an evil lord would control this world unless the angel of good intervenes.

Hatim must journey to distant lands and solve seven questions to destroy Dajjal's dark power. The emperor offers Hatim a magical sword. Jasmin lends Hatim her childhood friend and servant, as well as an elf named Hobo, as his bodyguard. As Hatim answers the questions, Dajjal's powers and magical towers are gradually destroyed. However, after Hatim answers the sixth question, there isn't enough time left to solve the seventh question.

The armies of Yemen, Paristan, Durgapur, and Janakpur descend on Jaffar for the final battle. As they fight against Dajjal's zombie army, Hatim enters the castle and fights Dajjal to death. They both die simultaneously, but Hatim defeats death by obtaining the answer to the seventh question.

== Cast ==
- Rahil Azam as Hatim, The Prince of Yemen
- Kiku Sharda as Hobo
- Pooja Ghai Rawal as Jasmine, The Princess of Paristan
- Nirmal Pandey as Dajjal, King of Jaffar
- Vijay Ganju as Najumi
- Yashwant Mahilwar as Younger Hatim
- Aditi Pratap as Princess Sunayna, Princess of Durgapur
- Romiit Raaj as Prince Vishal, Prince of Janakpur
- Jhanak Shukla as Little Jasmine
- Ravi Khanvilkar as The King of Yemen, Hatim’s father
- Neha Bam as The Queen of Yemen, Hatim's mother
- Reshma Modi as The Queen of Paristan
- Tom Alter as The King of Paristan
- Jaya Bhattacharya as Zalima
- Rushali Arora as Battila
- Usha Bachani as Princess Nadira
- Anisha Hinduja as Red-haired Queen
- Kumar Hegde as Azlaf
- Kishwer Merchant as Rubina
- Manasi Varma as Mallika-e-Hayat
- Tej Sapru as Pasha
- Kavi Kumar Azad as Argois
- Shilpa Shinde as Shakila
- Amrapali Gupta as Chaya, Maya's twin sister
- Sonia Kapoor as Mallika-e-Husn
- Shital Thakkar as Maya, Aishwarya's (Mallika-e-Husn) sister
- Tarakesh Chauhan as King of Durgapur and Father of Sunena
- Ankit Shah as Younger Hobo
- Vinod Kapoor as Anant
- Anwar Fatehan as Hakibo
- Rajeeta Kochhar as Teesta
- Akhil Mishra as Butler
- Devender Chaudhary as Ulta
- Jay Soni as Suarush
- Ram Awana as Cagaa
- Kamya Punjabi as Jaan-e-Jahan
- Nimai Bali as Shaitan Keharmaan
- Gireesh Sahdev as King Aashkaan
- Mukul Nag as Bezawal
- Rajeev Paul as Ramizo
- Iqbal Azad as Grand Vizier of Akalchand's Kingdom
- Harry Josh as Dracula
- Sunil Chauhan as Katib-e-Taqdeer
- Pappu Prem

== Broadcast ==
The series has been syndicated to various Indian channels such as Star Plus, Disney Channel India, STAR Utsav and Hungama TV. The series has also been dubbed in Tamil language for STAR Vijay channel titled Maaveeran Hatim.

== Awards ==
=== In 2004 ===
The Indian Television Academy Awards|

- Best Costumes - Nikhat Marriam Neerusha
- Best Editing - Papu Trivedi
- Best Make-up - Sagar Entertainment saga
- Best Visual Effects - Jyoti Sagar
- Best Mythological /Historical Serials - Jyoti Sagar Amrit Sagar
- Best Packaging - Amrit Sagar

=== In 2005 ===
- Best Children Programme Jyoti Sagar Amrit Sagar
- Best Art Direction - Mukesh Kalola
- Best Audiography - Sagar Entertainment
- Best Costumes - Nikhat Mariyam
- Best Make-up - Hari Nawar
- Best Visual Effects - Jyoti Sagar
