= Karuna Badwal =

Indian film producer

Karuna Badwal is an Indian business manager and film producer; she has co-produced films including Chennai Express and Happy New Year.

She began working with Shah Rukh Khan in 2006 and has been a member of his core professional team. At Red Chillies Entertainment, she has been involved in the production and marketing of Hindi films, including Chennai Express (2013), Happy New Year (2014) and Zero (2018). Her work has also included marketing campaigns for Ra.One (2011), the establishment of Kolkata Knight Riders, involvement in KidZania India and the development of Jawan (2023).

In July 2025, Badwal received the Aalekh Foundation's Women Achievers Award in recognition of her professional contributions.

== Career ==
She started her film career as Shahrukh Khan's business manager.

== Filmography ==
Year	Film	Role
2013	Chennai Express	Co-producer
2014	Happy New Year	Co-producer
2018	Zero	Co-producer
