= Hali Welly =

Indian Filmmaker

- Born: Sheba Village, East Kameng, Arunachal Pradesh, India
- Citizenship: Indian
- Education: Amity University, Mangalayatan University
- Occupations: Filmmaker & Photographer
- Years active: 2015–present
- Notable work: The Redemption (2023)

Hali Welly is an Indian filmmaker and photographer known for his 2023 feature film, The Redemption, which earned him Best Director (Feature Film) at the Rome International Film Awards in 2023..

== Early life and education ==
Hali Welly was born and raised in Sheba village, East Kameng district, Arunachal Pradesh He holds Master of Arts degree in Journalism from Amity University and is currently enrolled for his Ph.D at Mangalayatan University.

== Career ==
Welly is a civil engineer by profession. He works as an executive engineer in the Urban Development and Housing Department, Government of Arunachal Pradesh. He earlier served as Deputy Director in the Department of Urban Development, Government of Arunachal Pradesh.

While serving in government, he developed and pursued interests in filmmaking and photography. His film credits include short films and a feature-length film. He was also creative director of Sadak Ka Superstars (a reality show) in 2020.

Welly served as president of the Film Federation of Arunachal and hosted the 7th Arunachal Film Festival during his tenure. He was also the founding president of The Arunachal Photography Club (APC).

During his tenure in the Urban Development Department, Welly received commendation certificates from district administrations in Arunachal Pradesh for public service (2012, 2025).

=== Filmmaking ===
In 2017, Welly was the line producer for Aaba, a short Apatani language film written and directed by Amar Kaushik.

In 2015, Welly was credited as creative producer for the feature film, Itanagar 0 KM. The film was directed by Tai Gungte through Space Miracle Studio, and produced by Alison Welly. In 2020, he directed the short film, Swachh Bharat Mission: Arunachal Pradesh.

In 2022, Welly served as line producer for Bhediya, a comedy horror film shot and set in Arunachal Pradesh.

In 2023, Welly served as creative producer for Sangi Gai, a film directed by Nyago Ete and produced by Alison Welly Bakha. The film was screened at Cannes' Marché du Film in May 2024. Also in 2023, Welly made his feature‑length directorial debut with The Redemption, a drama primarily in the Gallo language.

== Awards and nominations ==
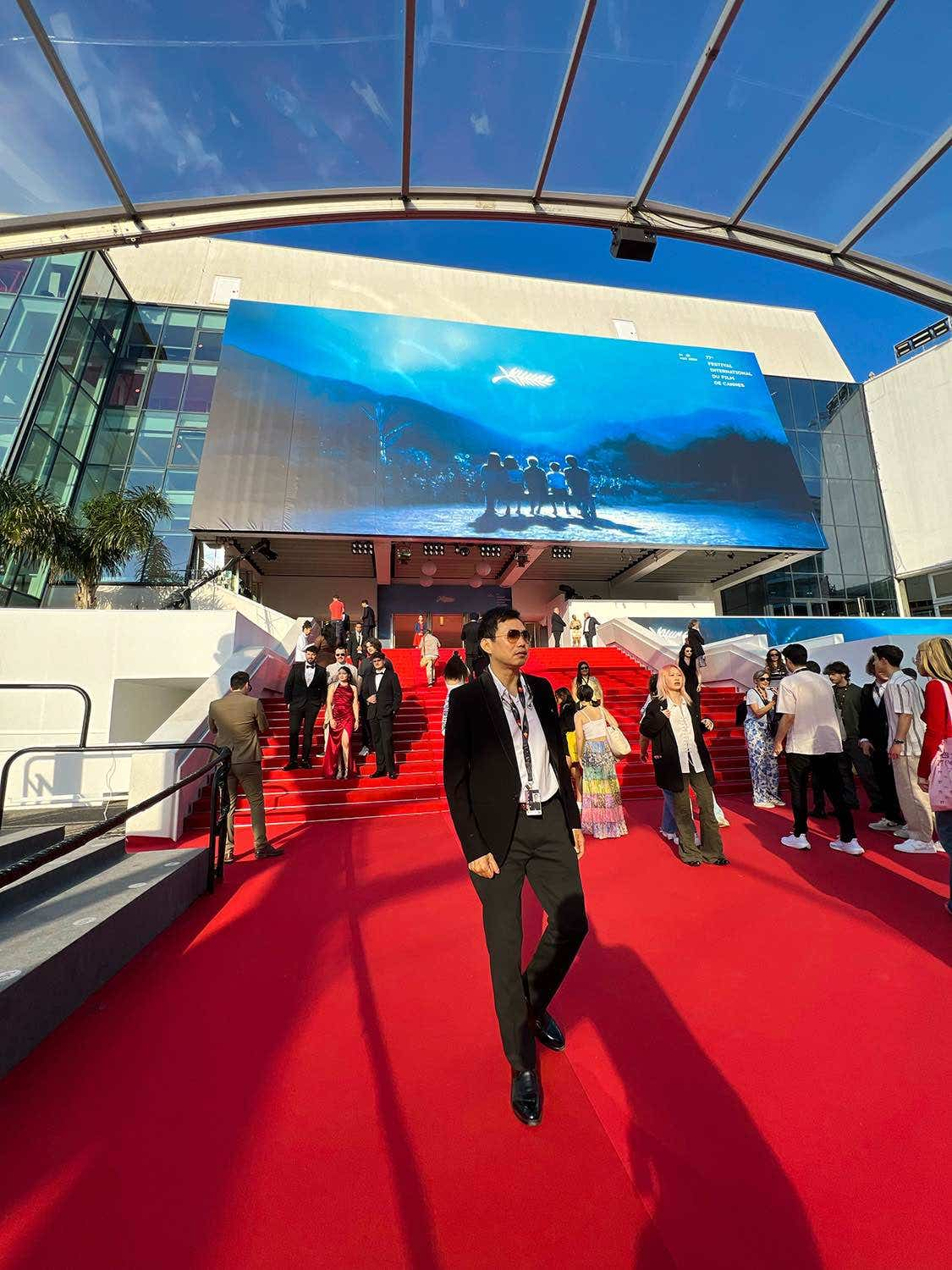
Hali Welly at the Cannes Film Festival, 2024

- 2017 - Won the Best Fashion Photographer Award at the inaugural North East Style Awards in 2017, held at Shilpagram, Guwahati
- 2023 - Feature film, The Redemption won 12 major awards at various international film festivals across the globe
- 2023 - Won the Best 1st Time Director (Feature Film)
- 2023 - Won the Best Director (Feature Film) at 2023 Rome International Film Awards
- 2025 - Received the FICCI Urban Innovation Award for Division of the Urban Development (UD) Department, conferred by the Federation of Indian Chambers of Commerce & Industry (FICCI)
- 2026 – Received the Chief Minister’s Award for Excellence in Public Administration on behalf of the Urban Development Department, West Siang District, Aalo, for the year 2025.

== Filmography ==
Year	Title	Role	Ref(s)
2015	Itanagar 0 KM	Creative Producer	
2017	Aaba	Line Producer	
2020	Swachh Bharat Mission: Arunachal Pradesh	Director	
2022	Bhediya	Line Producer	
2023	The Redemption	Director, Writer	
2024	Sangi Gai	Creative Producer	
