= Sam Fernandes =

Indian film producer (born 1980)

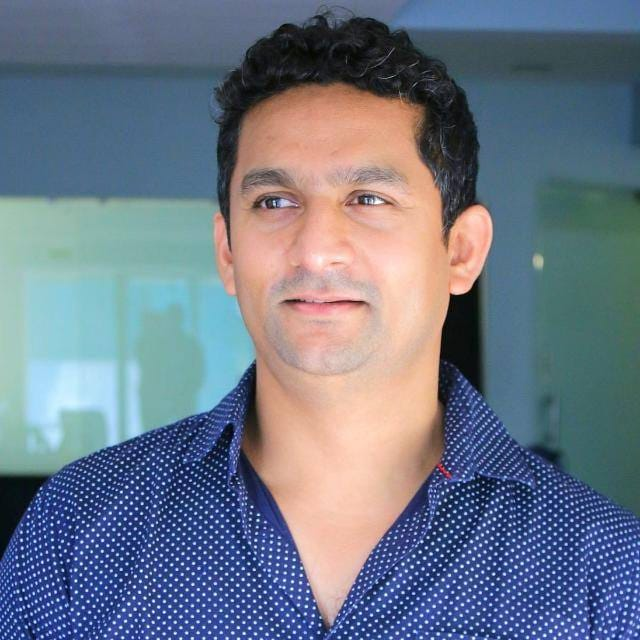
- Fernandes in Mumbai
- Born: 7 April 1980 (age 45); Bombay, Maharashtra, India
- Occupations: Producer; boxing promoter; ISP services
- Spouse: Ayesha Fernandes
- Children: 2
- Awards: Best Boxing Promoter for Asia Under World Boxing Council (WBC)

Sam Fernandes (born 7 April 1980) is an Indian film producer and distributor known for his works in Hindi cinema under Sparrow Films, Vauve Emirates and Emirates Media, Also being Associate with UVA International LLC and RV Group

== Early life and education ==
Sam Fernandes was born on 7 April 1980 in Mumbai, Maharashtra, in financial humble family. He dropped out of school in 5th grade and later pursued his career in marketing.

Sam has been associated with Bollywood and Boxing in India along with other initiatives.

Sam Fernandes is made the Head of the Indian chapter of the World Boxing Council in 2021. He also heads WBC Cares India Chapter which is the CSR wing of the council. The primary objective Of WBC Cares is to help the NGOs working towards various causes at grassroot levels.

== Awards and recognition ==
Sam Fernandes won the 2018 Best Boxing Promoter award for Asia by World Boxing Council.

== Filmography ==
Year	Film	Role	Notes
1999	Star Wars: Episode I – The Phantom Menace	Marketing & Distribution	
2000	Big Momma's House	Marketing & Distribution	
2000	Me, Myself & Irene	Marketing & Distribution	
2000	X-Men	Marketing & Distribution	
2000	Cast Away	Marketing Promotions	
2001	The Deep End	Marketing & Distribution	
2000	Original Sin	Marketing & Distribution	
2002	Ice Age	Marketing & Distribution	
2002	Die Another Day	Marketing & Distribution	
2003	Jhankaar Beats	Distribution	
2004	The Day After Tomorrow	Marketing & Distribution	
2005	Star Wars: Episode III – Revenge of the Sith	Marketing & Distribution	
2005	Parineeta	Chief Operation Officer	
2006	Lage Raho Munna Bhai	Chief Operation Officer	
2006	Dor	Marketing & Distribution	
2007	Eklavya: The Royal Guard	Chief Operation Officer	
2008	My Name Is Anthony Gonsalves	Marketing & Distribution	
2008	De Taali	Marketing & Distribution	
2009	Wanted	Marketing & Distribution Overlook	
2010	Aliens vs. Predator	Marketing & Distribution	Video Game
2006	Love Breakups Zindagi	Production Marketing Distribution	
2018	Joyride 2018	Producer	
2020	Hawa Singh	Producer	
2020	Untitled	Producer	
2020	Operation	Producer	
2020	Zainab - A true Story	Producer	
2021	Lost	Producer	
