= Vishnu Mathur =

Canadian-Indian film producer, cinematographer, and director

Vishnu Mathur (1934–2007) was a Canadian-Indian film producer, cinematographer and director who had worked in North America, Europe, Middle East and South-East Asia.

He moved from New Delhi to Canada in 1976. There he worked in film and television his main occupation being a producer/director for David Suzuki's The Nature of Things for 15 years.

He worked as a cinematographer for The Courtesans of Bombay (Ismail Merchant, 1983). His works include: India: The Lotus and The Cross, Firedance and The Red Bindi.

== See also ==
- Sarah Blaffer Hrdy
