= Joseph A. Walker (playwright) =

American dramatist (1935–2003)

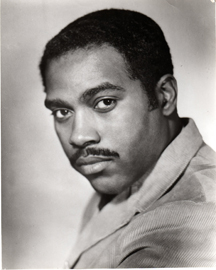
- Walker during his brief acting career
- Born: February 24, 1935; Washington, D.C., U.S.
- Died: January 25, 2003 (aged 67)
- Resting place: Lincoln Memorial Cemetery
- Occupations: Playwright, director, screenwriter, educator
- Spouse(s): Barbara A. Walker (1957–1965); Dorothy Ann Dinroe-Walker (1970–her death in 1995)

Joseph Alexander Walker (February 24, 1935 – January 25, 2003) was an American playwright and screenwriter, theater director, actor and professor. He is best known for writing The River Niger, a three-act play that was originally produced Off-Broadway in 1972 by the Negro Ensemble Company, before being transferred to Broadway in 1973 and then adapted into a 1976 film of the same name starring James Earl Jones and Cicely Tyson. In 1974, Walker became the first African-American writer to win a Tony Award, receiving the Tony Award for Best Play for The River Niger. The playwright previously won an Obie Award during that play's 1972 to 1973 Off-Broadway run.

== Biography ==
Walker was born in Washington, D.C., to Joseph A. Walker and Florine G. Johnson. He earned an undergraduate degree in philosophy from Howard University and completed all requirements except the thesis for a master's in philosophy. In 1957, he entered the Air Force as a second lieutenant and later received a master of fine arts degree in drama from Catholic University. In his later years, he taught drama at Howard University and served as chairman of the theater department at Rutgers University's Camden, New Jersey, campus.

Walker was one of the first African Americans, along with Lorraine Hansberry, to be nominated for the Tony Award for Best Play, which he won for The River Niger. His efforts and talents drew him critical acclaim at the Negro Ensemble Company (NEC), with Douglas Turner Ward as the artistic director. The River Niger's run was one of the NEC's longest consecutive runs. Other works include the drama District Line, Yin-Yang, The Harangues (Tribal Harangue 1, 2, and 3), The Lion is a Soul Brother, Out of the Ashes, Absolution of Willie Mae, Koulaba D. Haiti, and the musical King Buddy Bolden.

== Early life ==
Walker met his first wife, Barbara Ann, in philosophy class; they were married in September 1957. That same year Walker entered the Air Force, going first to San Antonio, Texas, and then to Harlingen Air Force Base before serving as first lieutenant, 2nd in command of 350 Airmen of the 42nd Supply Squadron. In 1958–60, while stationed at Loring Air Force Base, Walker became founder and artistic director of Pine Tree Theatre Guild. During that time, his first son, Michael Alexander Walker, was born. Walker's second son, Steven Martin Walker, was born in 1962. That same year, Walker was discharged and decided to pursue an MFA in Theatre with a minor in Elizabethan Drama at Catholic University. During this time, Barbara Walker pursued her law degree.

Walker's time in the Air Force is significant because the main character from The River Niger, Jeff Williams, was also discharged from the Air Force. In addition, the Williams character makes references to symbolically asking everyone at the Air Force base to "let go of my toe". Barbara Walker has stated that The River Niger may be semi-autobiographical.

He taught at Spingarn High School in Washington, D.C., from 1963 to 1965 as an English/drama teacher.

== Artistic career ==
Walker then began the pursuit of an acting career In 1966. He began studying voice and vocal reproduction from Brook Alexander and at the end of that year joined Voices, Inc. He remained narrator, lead singer, and artistic director of this organization until The Believers was produced in 1968. The Believers was co-authored by Walker and Josephine Jackson.

From 1969 to 1975, he taught at CCNY's Leonard Davis Center of Performing Arts as an associate professor in the speech and theatre department. Also in 1969 he met Moses Gunn, who introduced him to Douglas Turner Ward, the artistic director of The Negro Ensemble Company (NEC), which led to the production of The Harangues, opening the 1969–70 season. Ododo, which Walker wrote, directed, and co-choreographed, opened with mixed reviews in the 1970–71 season at NE. The music for "Ododo" was composed and directed by his second wife Dorothy Ann Dinroe-Walker, also a Howard University graduate. Walker married Dorothy A. Dinroe in 1970, a match made in their love for the arts.

Wanting to create his own theatre company, Walker became the artistic director of the Demi-Gods. The Demi-Gods was co-founded with his wife Dinroe-Walker between 1970 and 1974. In 1971–72, Walker and Dinroe-Walker co-produced Yin-Yang at the African American Studio. In 1972–73, Douglas Turner Ward went into production for The River Niger. The response to The River Niger was so overwhelming that the play was moved to the Brooks Atkinson Theatre on Broadway in 1973, where it won the Tony Award in 1974. In this same year his first daughter, Kumina Walker, was born.

Walker received 400 hours towards a Motion Picture Production Certificate received at the Germaine School of Photography, New York City, in 1973. He also completed 28 credits towards his Ph.D. in cinema studies at New York University and was honored as playwright-in-residence at Yale School of Drama.

== Later life ==
Walker spent his last years continuing his writings while maintaining full tenure at Rutgers University's Camden, N.J., campus, where he was chair of the theater arts department. He is survived by his five children Michael Walker, Steven Walker, Kumina Walker, Nandi Walker, and Jodoa Walker. Walker's youngest son, Kamau Walker, predeceased him in 2001.

== Awards and accomplishments ==
- Tony Award for Best Play for The River Niger, 1974
- Represented American Playwrights at seminar in Salzburg Austria
- Received the Guggenheim Award, 1973–74
- Antoinette Perry Award for best play of 1974
- Elizabeth-Kate Warriner Award
- First Annual Audelco Award
- Outer Critic's Circle, John Gassner Playwrighting Award
- The Obie Award
- Drama Desk Award
- Black Rose
- Professor of Theatre at Howard University, teaching advanced playwriting and advanced theatre, 1976–89
- Drama Department Chair the Duke Ellington School of Performing Arts held concurrently with Howard University professorship, 1978–79
- American College Theatre Award for best director and set design on Antigone Africanus produced at Howard University, 1978
- Recipient of the Rockefeller Foundation's Playwrights Award, 1978 (for The Absolution of Willie Mae)
- Maryland State Arts Council Award for The Two Real Coons, 1980
- Wrote, directed and choreographed A Proper Zulu Man and King Kong at His Majesty's Theatre, Johannesburg, South Africa, 1979–80
- Co-Authored screenplay BOP for Dustin Hoffman and Michael Camino (Columbia Pictures), 1984–85
- Living Legend Award, 1995
- Worked with Rutgers University, Camden City Board of Education and Cynthia Primas to launch what is now the Creative Arts High School, 1998
- Theatre Arts chairman and Director of African American Studies at Rutgers University Camden, 1989–2003
