= Scott Jacoby (actor) =

American actor

- Born: November 26, 1956 (age 69); Skokie, Illinois, U.S.
- Occupations: Actor, director
- Years active: 1968–1991
- Spouse: Lyn Jacoby (m. 1985)
- Children: 2

Scott Bennett "Scotty" Jacoby (born November 26, 1956) is an American former actor. He appeared in the 1972 television film That Certain Summer, for which he won an Emmy Award. He is also known for playing the lead role in the made-for-TV film Bad Ronald (1974), and his role opposite Jodie Foster in The Little Girl Who Lives Down the Lane (1976). He is also known for his recurring role as Dorothy's son, Michael Zbornak, in 3 episodes of the 1980s sitcom The Golden Girls.

== Early life ==
Jacoby was born in the Chicago suburb of Skokie, Illinois, and his family moved to Queens in New York City when he was ten years old. At the age of eleven, he was nominated for a Tony Award for his portrayal of Ally in the Broadway musical Golden Rainbow, which starred Steve Lawrence and Eydie Gormé, for the category Best Featured Actor in a Musical at the 22nd Tony Awards, held on April 21, 1968.

== Career ==
By the early 1970s, an editorial questioned whether Jacoby was "a new Mickey Rooney". He began his television career playing the role of "Hubcap", who was a friend of Josh Hall (Laurence Fishburne) on the ABC daytime soap opera One Life to Live. He also had a recurring role on the 1980s sitcom The Golden Girls as Michael Zbornak, the musician son of Dorothy Zbornak (Bea Arthur). In 2001, Jacoby co-directed Rage: 20 Years of Punk Rock West Coast Style.

== Personal life ==
Jacoby is the eldest of five acting siblings, including half-brothers Billy Jacoby (now Billy Jayne, born in 1969), Bobby Jacoby (now Robert Jayne, born in 1973), and sisters Laura Jacoby and Susan Jacoby.

Jacoby is of Jewish descent. He is married to Lyn Jacoby and they have two children.

== Filmography ==
=== Film ===
Year	Title	Role	Notes
1969	Children's Games	The Son	
1971	The Anderson Tapes	Jerry Bingham	
1972	Rivals	Jamie	
1973	Baxter!	Roger Baxter	
1976	The Little Girl Who Lives Down the Lane	Mario Podesta	
1977	Love and the Midnight Auto Supply	Justin	
1978	Our Winning Season	David Wakefield	
1986	The Supernaturals	Pvt. Chris Mendez	
1987	Return to Horror High	Josh Forbes	
1988	To Die For	Martin Planting	
1991	Son of Darkness: To Die For II	Martin	

=== Television ===
Year	Title	Role	Notes
1972	No Place to Run	Doug	ABC Movie of the Week
1972	That Certain Summer	Nick Salter	ABC Movie of the Week
1972	Medical Center	Tony	Episode: "No Way Out"
1973	The Man Who Could Talk to Kids	Kenny Lassiter	ABC Movie of the Week
1973	Toma	Jesse Wheelright	Episode: "Crime Without Victim"
1973, 1975	The Rookies	Frankie	2 episodes
1973–1975	Marcus Welby, M.D.	Various roles	3 episodes
1973-1974	One Life to Live	Hubcap	
1974	Grandpa, Mom, Dad and Richie		TV film
1974	Owen Marshall, Counselor at Law	Terry	Episode: "A Killer With a Badge"
1974	Bad Ronald	Ronald Wilby	Television film
1976	Smash-Up on Interstate 5	Lee Bassett	Television film
1977	79 Park Avenue	Paulie Fludjicki	2 episodes
1979	No Other Love	Bruce Michaels	Television film
1980	The Diary of Anne Frank	Peter van Daan	Television film
1983	Trapper John, M.D.	Matthew Murdock	Episode: "The Final Cut"
1986–1989	The Golden Girls	Michael Zbornak	3 episodes
1987	Murder, She Wrote	Danny Young	Episode: "Murder in a Minor Key"
