= Sidney Beckerman (film producer) =

American film producer

Sidney Beckerman (November 26, 1920 – February 25, 2008) was a producer of notable movies including The Adventures of Buckaroo Banzai Across the 8th Dimension, Cabaret, Joe Kidd, Kelly's Heroes, Portnoy's Complaint, Marathon Man, Marlowe, Red Dawn and The Sicilian.

== Filmography ==
He was a producer in all films unless otherwise noted.

=== Film ===
Year	Film	Credit	Notes
1969	Last Summer		
1969	Marlowe		
1970	Kelly's Heroes		
1972	Portnoy's Complaint		
1972	Joe Kidd		
1976	The River Niger		
1976	Marathon Man		
1979	Bloodline		
1980	Serial		
1980	Blood Beach	Executive producer	
1981	Inchon		
1982	A Stranger Is Watching		
1984	The Adventures of Buckaroo Banzai Across the 8th Dimension	Executive producer	
1984	Red Dawn	Executive producer	
1986	Inside Out		
1987	The Sicilian	Executive producer	Final film as a producer

Miscellaneous crew

Year	Film	Role
1968	Nobody Runs Forever	Production associate
1976	The River Niger	Presenter

Thanks

Year	Film	Role
1981	Thief	Thanks
