= Ravi Agrawal (film producer) =

Indian film producer

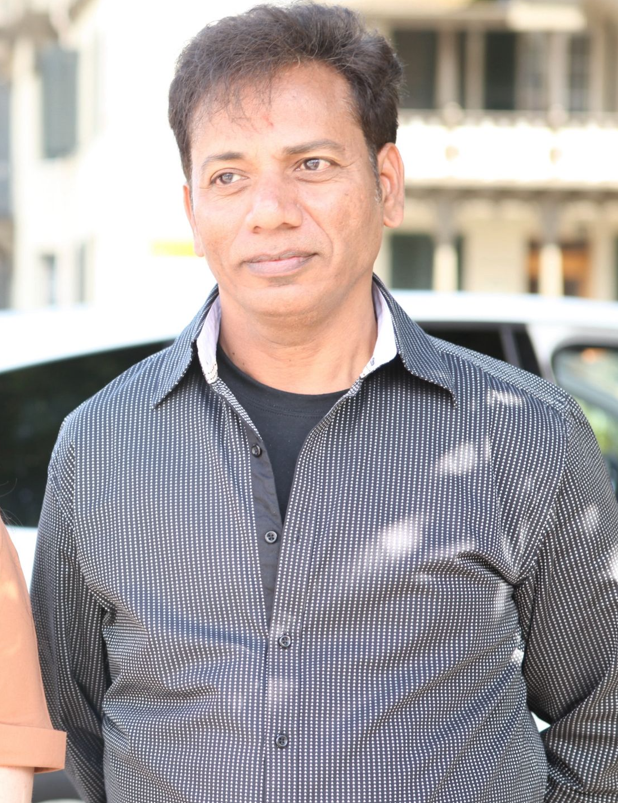
- Born: 20 August 1962 (age 63); India
- Occupations: Film producer, Entrepreneur, Book publisher
- Years active: 2004–present

Ravi Agrawal (born 20 August 1962) is an Indian film producer and entrepreneur who has worked in Hindi and Marathi cinema. He is the founder of Plus Entertainment Pvt. Ltd. and has produced films such as Deadline: Sirf 24 Ghante, Radio: Love on Air, Mahasatta, and Fever. He also started a publishing label, Plus Ink, which released the novel I, Romantic in 2010.

== Background ==
Born on 20 August 1962, Ravi Agrawal developed a deep interest in theatre during his college years, directing several plays as a student. His creative pursuits eventually led him to the world of cinema, where he began his journey in film production in 2004. He also founded a publishing division, Plus Ink, to promote film literature. Its first release, I, Romantic, received positive reviews.

== Career ==
He produced his first film in 2006 titled Deadline: Sirf 24 Ghante, which was a box office success. In 2009, he released Radio – Love on Air, starring Himesh Reshammiya. Later, he produced Handover and Fever in 2011 and 2016, respectively.

=== As a Book Publisher ===
As a publisher, Ravi Agrawal helped director Rajeev Jhaveri release his debut novel I, Romantic under his firm Plus Ink in 2010.

== Filmography ==
Key
†	Denotes films that have not yet been released

Year	Title	Language
2004	Akalpit	Marathi
2005	Salaam – The Salute	Marathi
2006	Deadline: Sirf 24 Ghante	Hindi
2009	Radio – Love on Air	Hindi
2010	Mahasatta	Marathi
2011	Handover	Hindi
2016	Fever	Hindi

== Awards and nominations summary ==
Year	Award	Category	Film	Result
2005	Sanskruti Kala Darpan	Best Director	Salaam – The Salute	Won
2005	Government of Maharashtra	Best Child Artist	Salaam – The Salute	Won
2009	Stardust Awards	Best Lyrics	Radio – Love on Air (Hindi Film)	Won
2010	Zee Gaurav Awards	Best Screenplay	Mahasatta (Marathi Film)	Won
2010	Zee Gaurav Awards	Best Film	Mahasatta (Marathi Film)	Nominated
2010	Zee Gaurav Awards	Best Actor	Mahasatta (Marathi Film)	Nominated
2010	V. Shantaram Awards	Best Story	Mahasatta (Marathi Film)	Nominated
