= Jai Arjun Singh =

Indian freelance writer

Jai Arjun Singh is an Indian freelance writer and journalist based in New Delhi. He has written for Yahoo! India, Business Standard, The Hindu, The Man, Tehelka, Outlook Traveler, The Sunday Guardian and the Hindustan Times, among other publications. His book about the making of the cult comedy film Jaane Bhi Do Yaaro was published by HarperCollins India in 2010. He has also edited The Popcorn Essayists: What Movies Do to Writers, an anthology of original film-related essays for Tranquebar. He writes a popular blog called Jabberwock. He has contributed a story, "Milky Ways", in a book edited by Jaishree Mishra "Of Mothers and Others".

== Books ==
- Jaane Bhi Do Yaaro: Seriously Funny Since 1983, HarperCollins Publishers (2012) ISBN 9789350292785
- The World of Hrishikesh Mukherjee, Penguin UK (2015) ISBN 9789352141951
- Popcorn Essayists, Westland (2011) ISBN 9789380658353
