= Hard Rock Zombies =

- Theatrical release poster
- Directed by: Krishna Shah
- Written by: David Allen Ball; Krishna Shah
- Screenplay by: Barry Shipman; Ed Earl Repp
- Produced by: Steve Golin; Shashi Patel; Krishna Shah; Sigurjón Sighvatsson
- Starring: E.J. Curse; Geno Andrews; Sam Mann; Mick McMains; Lisa Toothman; Jennifer Coe; Ted Wells; Jack Bliesener
- Cinematography: Tom Richmond
- Edited by: Amit Bose
- Music by: Paul Sabu
- Production company: Patel/Shah Film Company
- Distributed by: Cannon Film Distributors
- Release date: September 1985
- Running time: 98 minutes
- Country: United States
- Language: English

Hard Rock Zombies is a 1985 American comedy horror film directed and co-written by Krishna Shah, and starring E.J. Curse, Geno Andrews, Sam Mann, Mick McMains, Lisa Toothman, Jennifer Coe, Ted Wells, and Jack Bliesener. The film was released by Cannon Film Distributors in September 1985.

In the film, the members of a heavy metal band are murdered by a music-hating Nazi cult. They are then accidentally brought back to life as zombies, through song lyrics copied from a medieval grimoire. While the band attempts to perform music again, their song creates more zombies.

== Plot ==
Holy Moses, a rock band led by lead singer and bassist Jessie, is informed by their manager Ron that they will be performing at a small conservative Californian town in an effort to impress Don Matson, a famous record company executive whom Ron hopes will give the band a record deal. Before leaving, however, Jessie encounters a girl named Cassie (aged 12-14), who tells him to stay away from the town.

The next day, whilst driving to the town, Ron and Holy Moses meet a young woman named Elsa, who convinces them to stay over at her family's mansion for the weekend. Whilst exploring the town, however, the band finds the locals to be unusually bigoted against them, warning them not to perform tomorrow. The town sheriff even throws them in jail for seemingly no reason, but Cassie quickly shows up and saves the band by giving them bail money. Later, Ron is brought to an emergency town council meeting which ultimately introduces a new law banning rock 'n' roll music in town. Cassie's father then grabs a shotgun, planning to do away with the band.

Back at Elsa's mansion, Jessie practices a song he has been writing based on an ancient Latin text that was supposedly used to resurrect the dead. He discovers that the magic actually works when he inadvertedly brings a dead tarantula back to life by playing the song. Meanwhile, the other band members are brutally murdered by Elsa and her mother Eva, who is actually a werewolf. Cassie rushes to Eva's mansion to warn Jessie about her father, only for Eva's groundskeeper Olaf to appear and start chasing them. Jessie gives Cassie a tape recording of the song and tells her to play it in case he gets caught, right before Olaf catches up to him and kills him with a weedwhacker.

The next morning, after the band's funeral, a now jobless Ron dines with Elsa and her family. Elsa's father suddenly reveals himself to be Adolf Hitler (in turn revealing that Eva is actually Eva Braun), who apparently faked his death and is planning to establish a Fourth Reich. Meanwhile, Cassie fulfils her promise to Jessie and plays the tape, causing Holy Moses to be resurrected as zombies. The band quickly gets revenge on their killers, killing Elsa, Eva, Olaf, Hitler and the rest of the family. Ron, having witnessed the deaths, rushes to the town hall and tries to tell everyone about what he saw. When the townsfolk go to the mansion to investigate, Hitler and the rest of the family come back as zombies and begin their own killing spree, turning many civilians into zombies, including the sheriff and Cassie's father.

Cassie escapes to a local theatre, where Holy Moses are set to perform their scheduled gig. The band arrives, as does Don Matson, who is completely unaware of the zombie epidemic in town. He watches their performance and is highly impressed, but the zombies then arrive right as the gig comes to an end, forcing Cassie to flee. Matson is attacked and turned into a zombie as the band leaves and returns to their graves. Meanwhile, the surviving townsfolk gather in a safezone, and one survivor gets the idea to sacrifice a virgin to be used a sex slave for the zombies, believing it will convince them to leave town. The townsfolk choose Cassie as their sacrifice and prepare to tie her to a tree and leave her for dead. Ron tries desperately to convince the band to come back out of their graves in order to save her. His pleading works, and the band performs a song that successfully distracts the zombies long enough for Ron to save Cassie. The band then lures the zombies into a secret underground chamber that Hitler had shown to Ron earlier. Ron activates the chamber's highly advanced poison gases, causing all the zombies to suffocate to death, including the bandmembers. Ron decides to leave town, and as Cassie stays behind to mourn the loss of Jessie, Jessie's hand bursts out of his grave. Cassie caresses Jessie's hand and tells him she will love him forever.

== Cast ==
- E.J. Curse as Jessie
- Geno Andrews as Tommy
- Sam Mann as Chuck
- Mick McMains as Robby
- Lisa Toothman as Elsa
- Jennifer Coe as Cassie
- Ted Wells as Ron
- Jack Bliesener as Adolf Hitler
- Richard Vidan as Sheriff Dillon
- Phil Fondacaro as Mickey
- Crystal Shaw Martell as Mrs. Buff
- Vincent De Stefano as Olaf
- Gary Friedkin as Buckey
- Christopher Perkins as Christian
- Michael David Simms as Don Matson
- Nadia as Eva
- Susan Prevatte as Wolf Lady
- Emmanuel Shipov as Grandfather
- Stacy Stockman as Lu-Ann
- David O'Hara as Ed
- Jonathan King as Red
- Donald Moran as Ted
- David Schroeder as Cassie's Father
- John Drake as Old Man / Ancient Man
- Maria Porter as Maria
- John Fleck as Arnold

== Production ==
The film was made in 1983 at the same time as American Drive-In and featured as the drive-in movie within that film.

=== Home media ===
On April 26, 2022, the movie was released on Blu-Ray for the first time by Vinegar Syndrome as part of a two-disk set with Slaughterhouse Rock.
