= Gunahon Ka Devta =

Gunahon Ka Devta may refer to:

- Gunahon Ka Devta (novel) (The Deity of the Sins), 1949 Hindi-language novel by Indian writer Dharmveer Bharti
- Gunahon Ka Devta (1967 film), an Indian film produced and directed by Devi Sharma
- Gunahon Ka Devta (1990 film), an Indian film directed by Kawal Sharma
- Gunahon Ka Devta (TV series), an Indian television series that aired on Imagine TV from September 2010

== See also ==
- Ek Tha Chander Ek Thi Sudha, an unrealized 1969 Indian film based on the novel, starting Amitabh Bachchan and Rekha
- Ek Tha Chander Ek Thi Sudha, a 2015 Indian TV series based on the novel
