= Andha Yug =

1953 verse play by Dharamvir Bharati

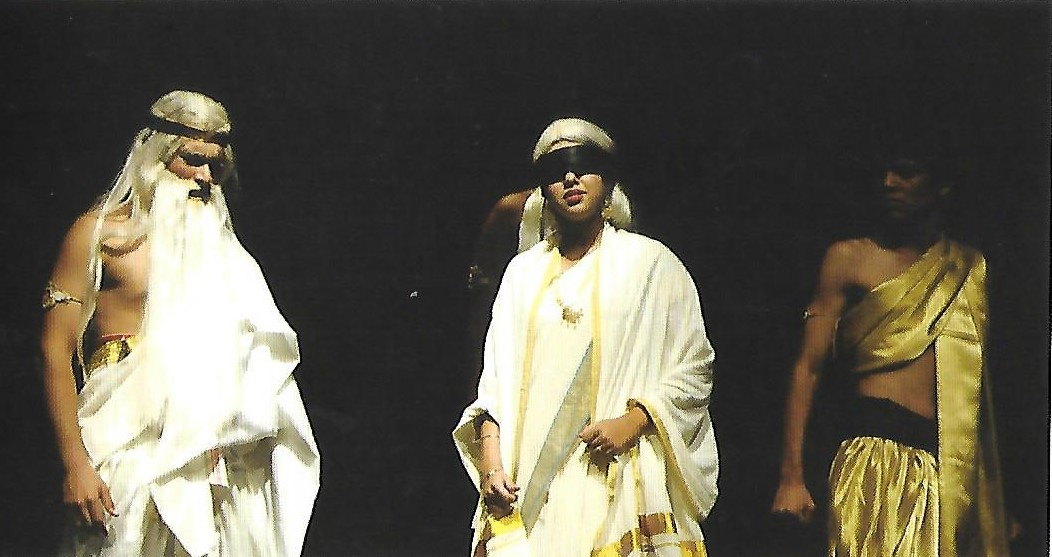
- A 2010 production of the play at The Doon School, Dehradun
- Original language: Hindi
- Written by: Dharamvir Bharati
- Characters: Kauravas; Pandavas; Krishna; Ashwatthama
- Subject: anti-war
- Genre: Historical Play
- Setting: Last day of the Mahabharat war

Premiere
- Date: 1962, written 1954
- Place: Mumbai by Theatre Unit, theatre group

Andha Yug (Hindi: अंधा युग, The Age of Blindness or The Blind Age) is a 1953 verse play written in Hindi, by renowned novelist, poet, and playwright Dharamvir Bharati (1926–1997). Set in the last day of the Great Mahabharat war, the five-act tragedy was written in the years following the 1947 partition of India atrocities, as allegory to its destruction of human lives and ethical values. It is a metaphoric meditation on the politics of violence and aggressive selfhood and how war dehumanized individuals and society. Thus, both the victor and the vanquished lose eventually.

The anti-war play first created sensation as a radio play at Allahabad All India Radio. This led to its production by Mumbai-based theatre director, Satyadev Dubey (1962), and subsequent famous production by theatre doyen Ebrahim Alkazi against the backdrop of historical monuments in Delhi (like Feroz Shah Kotla and Purana Qila). It became "a national theatrical event"; his 1963 production was seen by then Prime Minister, Jawaharlal Nehru. It was subsequently staged by numerous directors and in many Indian languages.

As part of the "theatre of the roots" movement which started in Indian theatre in the 1950s, which tried to look into Indian epics and myths for form, inspiration and content, Andha Yug is today recognised as the "play that heralded a new era in Indian theatre" and standard repertoire of Hindi theatre. Dharamvir Bharati wrote only this one play during his career and was awarded the Sangeet Natak Akademi Award in Playwriting (Hindi) in 1988, given by Sangeet Natak Akademi, India's National Academy of Music, Dance and Drama.

== Overview ==
"When will this bloodbath end?

Oh what a war which no one wins

and loses both foe and friend.."

— Andha Yug

Andha Yug is based on the ancient Sanskrit epic, Mahabharata written by Ved Vyasa. The play begins on the eighteenth and last day of the Great Mahabharata War, which devastated the kingdom of Kauravas, the feuding cousins of Pandavas, their capital the once-magnificent Hastinapur lay burning, in ruins, the battlefield of Kurukshetra was strewn with corpses, and skies filled with vultures and death laments. Fatalities were on both sides as cousins killed each other. The survivors were left grieving and enraged as they continued to blame each other for the destruction. No one was willing to view it as a consequence of their own moral choices.

Ashwatthama, son of guru Dronacharya, in one last-ditch act of revenge against the Pandavas, releases the ultimate weapon of destruction — the Brahmastra, which promises to annihilate the world. No one comes forward to condemn it: Ethics and humanity have been the first casualties of the war.

Krishna who mediated between the cousins before war, remains the moral centre of the play. Even in his failure he presents options that are ethical and just and reminds us that a higher or sacred way is always accessible to human beings even in the worst of times. The play ends with the death of Krishna.

== Play structure ==
Bharati constructed the play using western drama tradition and early Indian drama, found in Sanskrit drama.

- Prologue
- Act One: The Kaurava Kingdom
- Act Two: The Making of a Beast
- Act Three: The Half-truth of Ashwatthama
- Interlude: Feathers, Wheels and Bandages
- Act Four: Gandhari's Curse
- Act Five: Victory and a Series of Suicides
- Epilogue: Death of the Lord

== Themes ==
Andha Yug highlights the perils of self-enchantment in an anti-war allegory. It explores human capacity for moral action, reconciliation, and goodness in times of atrocity and reveals what happens when individuals succumb to the cruelty and cynicism of a blind, dispirited age.

When a ruler, epitomized by a blind Dhritarashtra (physically and also by his ambition for his son Duryodhana), in an equally blind society fail its own side and that of their loved ones. It elaborates on the consequences, when a society fails to stop a cycle of revenge and instead choose a redemptive path, which is always available even in worst of scenarios. This is shown by Krishna's presence amid the mindlessness of fellow human beings. It was only when they collectively reject the voice of wisdom that denigration of war step upon them, leading to wide-scale bloodshed.

The story hints at the perils that await a society that turns away from its wisdom culture and instead succumb to the logic of the moment that can be easily swayed by emotions. Bharati uses the war of Mahabharat to make an anti-war statement and raises questions regarding moral uprightness in the wake of Partition-related atrocities, loss of faith and national identity.

Some directors have used it to bring out contemporary issues like the role of diplomacy of the world.

== History ==
I suddenly understood
as if in a flash of revelation
that when a man
surrenders his selfhood
and challenges history
he can change the course
of the stars.

The lines of fate
are not carved in stone.
They can be drawn and redrawn
at every moment of time
by the will of man.

— excerpt from Andha Yug

Dharamvir Bharati (1926–1997), was a renowned Hindi novelist, poet, and playwright. His novels, Gunahon Ka Devta (The God of Sins, 1949) and Suraj Ka Satvan Ghoda (The Seventh Horse of the Sun, 1952), are classics of Hindi literature. The latter was adapted into a film by Shyam Benegal in 1992.

Originally written as a radio play, the play was first broadcast by the All India Radio (public radio) and immediately drew attention.

Playwright and theatre director Satyadev Dubey heard of the play and met Bharati when the latter had dropped in to see Dubey's Hindi adaptation of Albert Camus's Cross Purposes, as Sapne. Recognizing its potential, Dubey walked around with the script for nearly 10 years trying to get it done. Dubey had been running 'Theatre Unit' (a theatre group started by Ebrahim Alkazi who moved to Delhi in 1962 as director of National School of Drama, Delhi), After staging it himself in 1962, Dubey sent the script to Alkazi. Though many found the play lacking action, Alkazi believed, "action is not rushing around. It’s inward growth."

Alkazi's production made history in modern Indian theatre, when he staged first Andha Yug in 1963, first amidst the backdrop of the ruins of Feroz Shah Kotla, Delhi and then Purana Quila's tiered steps in the 70s. It brought in a new paradigm in Indian theatres. The music for this production was given by noted composer Vanraj Bhatia.

In the coming years, the play attracted many directors and was staged across the country, including Mohan Maharishi, Ram Gopal Bajaj, and Bhanu Bharti. M.K. Raina staged the play in Berlin and the Festival of India in the USSR in 1987, Ratan Thiyam staged it in an open-air performance in Tonga, Japan, on 5 August 1994, a day before the 49th anniversary of atomic bombing of Hiroshima. Other noted productions have been by directors Arvind Gaur, Girish Tiwari (Girda), and Bijon Mondal (2010), who gave it a contemporary twist, accompanied by fusion band. A notable production in 2010 at Feroze Shah Kotla ruins included a cast of Ashish Vidyarthi (Ashwatthama), Uttara Baokar (Gandhari), Mohan Maharishi (Dhritrashtra), Vasant Josalkar (Vidur), Ravi Jhankal (Vriddha Yachak), Om Puri (Krishna), Govind Namdev (Vyas).

== Translations ==
- Andha Yug (English), by Dharamvir Bharati, Tr. Alok Bhalla. Oxford University Press, USA, 2010. ISBN 0-19-806522-1.
- Andha Yug (Odia), by Dharamvir Bharati, Tr. Saudamini Nanda . Sahitya Akademi, 2001. ISBN 81-260-1233-1.
- Andha Yug (English), by Dharamvir Bharati, Tr. Tripurari Sharma. National School of Drama. 2001
- Andha Yug (English, by Dharamvir Bharati, Tr. Paul Jacob and Meena Williams, Enact, 1972.

== See also ==
- List of plays with anti-war themes
