= Rahil Azam =

Indian actor and model (born 1981)

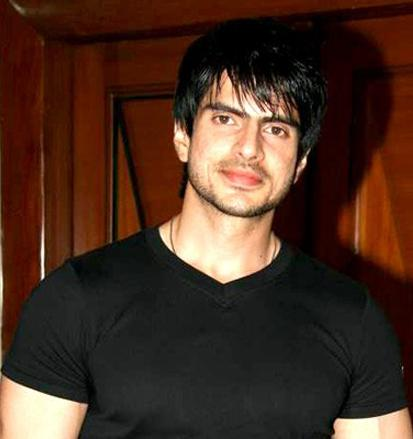
- Rahil Azam
- Born: 25 September 1981 (age 45); Bangalore, Karnataka, India
- Education: Clarence High School (India), B.M.S. College of Engineering, B.M.S. Institute of Technology and Management
- Occupations: Actor; Model
- Years active: 1999–present
- Known for: Hatim and Achanak 37 Saal Baad

Rahil Azam (born 25 September 1981) is an Indian actor and model, best known for his roles as Hatim in Hatim, Nakul in CID, JD in Tu Aashiqui, DSP Anubhav Singh in Maddam Sir, and Rahul/Ajinkya in Achanak 37 Saal Baad.

== Early life and education ==
Azam was born on 25 September 1981 in Bangalore, India.

Azam did his schooling at Clarence High School and graduated in software engineering from B.M.S. College of Engineering. In 1999, Azam came to Mumbai to pursue his engineering career. He took acting classes for three months.

He is also employed in his family business in Bangalore.

== Career ==
Azam had started his career as a software engineer. After shifting to Mumbai, he started his career as a model. He then made his television debut in 2001 with the role of a romantic boy, Akash Kapoor, in the daily soap Ek Tukdaa Chaand Ka. The story revolves around a small-town girl who follows her lover into the city but is then ditched by him. Later, he appeared in episodic roles in the horror show Ssshhhh...Koi Hai on Star Plus. After that, he did another horror show, Achanak 37 Saal Baad. Azam also appeared in Bhabhi as Rakesh.

In 2003, Azam played the lead role in Sagar Films' adventure-fantasy drama series Hatim on Star Plus. The story begins with the birth of Hatim, the son of the Emperor of Yemen.

Later, in May 2004, Azam featured in the lead role of Ashmit Malhotra in Vipul D. Shah's drama show Ye Meri Life Hai, for which he was nominated for the Best Actor in a Negative role (Male) at the Indian Telly Awards. After this, he played the role of Suraj Kiran in Saarrthi.

In 2005, he appeared in an episodic role in C.I.D, where he played the negative character of Nakul, ACP Pradyuman (played by Shivaji Satam)'s son. Azam's character returned to C.I.D. on 2 January 2015, to take revenge on his father as a terrorist in the episode "Nakul Returns".

In August 2006, Azam featured as the male lead in Hats Off Productions' drama series Resham Dankh, wherein he portrayed the role of Aditya Balraj, a business tycoon, opposite Mouli Ganguly. The show is based on the Gujarati magazine Chitralekha. It is the story of a successful business tycoon who has a silk business and a happy family but with a twist. Aditya gives himself up to police stating that he had committed a murder. As soon as he enters the prison he decides to write memoirs through a story.

In July 2007, Azam was chosen to play the pivotal role in Contiloe Entertainment's horror television series Ssshhhh...Phir Koi Hai, where he portrayed the role of Aryaamaan, a protector who saves people from the dark forces, in a special series named Ssshhhh...Phir Koi Hai - Aryaamaan.

In 2008, Azam was approached to play the dual characters of a woman and man as a split personality in Ratna Sinha's show Babul Ka Aangann Chootey Na, for which he received a nomination in the Best Actor category at the Indian Television Academy Awards.

In March 2009, Azam was approached for the lead role of Raka in Sunil Vohra's show Seeta Aur Geeta, but he was out of the show due to Malaria. Thereafter he played the lead role of Abhimanyu Mishra in Sahara One's TV show Mr. & Mrs. Mishra. The show is about a team of UNIT 9 cops who specialise in solving complicated cases. Mr. & Mrs. Mishra explores a different aspect of crime and investigation.

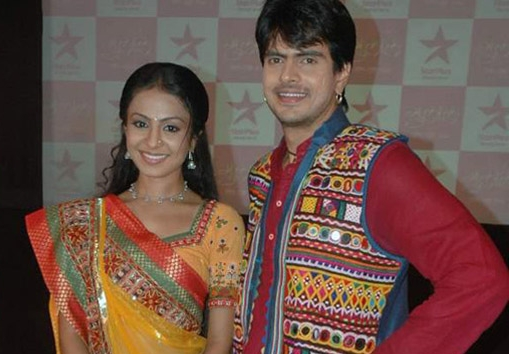
Azam and Manasi Parekh at the launch of Gulaal

In 2010, Azam featured as the male lead in Sphere Origins's drama show Gulaal, where he portrayed the role of Vasant, opposite Manasi Parekh. It is the story of a young girl, Gulaal, who is very lively and positive in life. She has a unique gift of finding water in the dry lands of a desert. A neighbouring village has been facing a harsh and long drought. Vasant learns of Gulaal's gift and makes it his mission to find Gulaal. Eventually their love blossoms and they get married.

In July 2012, Azam was chosen to play the pivotal role of Dr. Yudhistir in Fireworks Productions' suspense/thriller series Hum Ne Li Hai... Shapath, opposite Sargun Mehta. The story revolves around a murder that took place at a rave party.

Near the end of the year, Azam essayed the negative role of Zara's (Rati Pandey) husband, Malik Khan. He started shooting for the show on 12 September 2012, where his character had mysterious shades and is said to be loosely inspired by Aamir Khan's character in Fanaa.

In July 2013, Azam was approached for the role of Vanraj in Sanjay Leela Bhansali's show Saraswatichandra, but he was out of the show and replaced by Anshul Trivedi.

In 2015, Azam essayed the negative role of Dansh – the head of Naagvansh, in Arvind Babbal's mytho-thriller show Maha Kumbh: Ek Rahasaya, Ek Kahani on Life OK. The story revolves around the fight between the Garudas and Naagvansh, where the Garudas unite to protect Amrit, while the evil Naags arrive to take the Amrit.

Following the programme's end, Azam featured as the male lead role of Chander opposite Umang Jain in Life OK's mini-series Ek Tha Chander Ek Thi Sudha, an adaptation of the popular 1949 Hindi novel, Gunahon Ka Devta by Dharamvir Bharati. It is the story of a young and mischievous Sudha and researcher Chandar who is a protege of her father. The bond that Chandar and Sudha share is that of two good-humoured, inseparable friends, and neither understands that their relationship may have a name.

From 2017 to 2018, he played the role of Jayant Dhanrajgir in the Colors TV's show Tu Aashiqui. In February 2020, he appeared in Star Plus's Dil Jaise Dhadke... Dhadakne Do as Shivraj "Devguru" Singh.

In November 2020, he joined Sab TV's show Maddam Sir in the role of Anubhav Singh, DSP, until his character concluded in 2022.

In 2023, he played Raghav opposite Reena Kapoor in Star Bharat's Dheere Dheere Se.

From January 2025 to March 2026, he played Parag Kothari opposite Zalak Desai in StarPlus' Anupamaa.

== Filmography ==
=== Films ===
Year	Film	Role
2005	Taj Mahal: An Eternal Love Story	Shahryar Mirza

=== Television ===
Year	Title	Role	Notes
2001	Ek Tukdaa Chand Ka	Akash Kapoor	
2001; 2007	Ssshhhh...Koi Hai	Mandaar/Aryamann	Season 1-2
2002–2003	Achanak 37 Saal Baad	Rahul/Ajinkya	
2002–2004	Bhabhi	Rakesh Chopra	
2003	Kaahin Kissii Roz	Karan Seth	
2003–2004	Hatim	Hatim	
2004–2005	Ye Meri Life Hai	Ashmit Malhotra	
2004–2006	Saarrthi	Suraj Kiran	
2004–2005; 2015	C.I.D.	Nakul Pradyuman	
2005	Princess Dollie Aur Uska Magic Bag	Hatim	
2006–2007	Resham Dankh	Aditya Balraj	
2007	Betiyaan Apni Ya Paraya Dhan	Vedant	
2007	Parrivaar	Adhiraj "Adi" Shergill	
2008–2009	Babul Ka Aangann Chootey Na	Swayam Ranawat	
2009	Mr. & Mrs. Mishra	Abhimanyu Mishra	
2010–2011	Zindagi Ki Har Rang... Gulaal	Vasant	
2011	Mukti Bandhan	Jimmy	
2012; 2016	SuperCops Vs Super Villains	Dr. Yudhistir / Professor Vidyut	
2012	Hitler Didi	Malik Khan	
2015	Maha Kumbh: Ek Rahasaya, Ek Kahani	Dansh	
2015	Ek Tha Chander Ek Thi Sudha	Chandar Kapoor	
2017–2018	Tu Aashiqui	Jayant Dhanrajgir	
2018	Laal Ishq	Adarsh/Shyaam	Episodes 28 and 131
2019	Court Room – Sachchai Hazir Ho	Advocate Rashid Momin	
2020	Dil Jaise Dhadke... Dhadakne Do	Devguru	
2020–2022	Maddam Sir	DSP Anubhav Singh	
2022	Control Room	Mohit Chettani	
2022–2023	Dheere Dheere Se	Raghav Srivastav	
2025–2026	Anupamaa	Parag Kothari	

=== Web series ===
Year	Title	Role
2021	Games of Karma	Rajat

=== Music videos ===
Year	Title	Singer
2011	"Tum Toh Thehre Pardesi"	Altaf Raja
2018	"Tere Bin Nahi Lagda"	Nusrat Fateh Ali Khan
2018	"Akhiyan Lar Gaiyan"	Nusrat Fateh Ali Khan

== Awards and nominations ==
Year	Award	Category	Work	Result
2005	Indian Telly Awards	Best Actor in a Negative - Male	Yeh Meri Life Hai	Nominated
2008	Indian Television Academy Awards	Best Actor	Babul Ka Aangann Chootey Na	Nominated
2018	Boroplus Gold Awards	Best Actor in a Lead Role Male (Negative)	Tu Aashiqui	Nominated
2018	Indian Television Academy Awards	Best Actor In A Negative Role (Popular)	Tu Aashiqui	Nominated
2019	Indian Telly Awards	Actor in Negative Role (Male)	Tu Aashiqui	Nominated
2021	Indian Telly Awards	Best Actor in a Lead Role Male	Maddam Sir	Nominated
