= Southern Girls (play) =

- Written by: Sheri Bailey and Dura Temple
- Characters: Naomi Hurdle, Ruth Hurdle, Wanda-Sue Johnson, Charlotte Cecil, Dolly Granger, and June-Adele Taylor
- Original language: English
- Subject: Racial conflict, Discrimination
- Genre: Drama, memory play
- Setting: Tuscaloosa, Alabama

Premiere
- Date premiered: November 1991
- Place premiered: The University of Alabama's Galloway Theatre, Tuscaloosa, Alabama

Southern Girls is a 1991 Drama/Memory play by Sheri Bailey and Dura Temple about the lives of 6 southern women (3 black and 3 white) from childhood to middle age outside of Birmingham, Alabama. Though strong in friendship during childhood, the girls begin to lead separate lives due to the racial conflict that surrounds them. Black sisters Ruth and Naomi face challenges in their world as white friends Dolly, Charlotte (half sister to Wanda-Sue), and June-Adele navigate theirs, with Wanda-Sue (half black and half white) caught in between.

The play draws on the white and black experience of the 6 southern women as their lives change over time. The play features four phases divided into two acts from 1952 to the present.

== Performances ==
Southern Girls premiered at The Galloway Theatre by The University of Alabama (Tuscaloosa) in November 1991 and at the Powerhouse Theatre in Santa Monica where it was reviewed and featured in the Los Angeles Times in 1995.

== Actors ==
Actresses in the first Southern Girls performance include Niambi Williams as Naomi, LaTricia W. Williams as Ruth, Mari Louderbough as Wanda-Sue, Jenny McKnight as Charlotte Cecil, Rae Ruff as Dolly Granger, and Melissa Bush as June-Adele. Actresses of the 1995 Los Angeles include Lydia Hannibal as Ruth, Nancy Cheryll Davis as Wanda-Sue, Veronica Thompson as Naomi, Betsy Zang as Charlotte, Joan Chodorow as Dolly, and Terry Davis as June-Adele. From the October 2010 Lyon College performance: Haley Hudson as June-Adele Taylor, Miracle Davis as Naomi Hurdle, Kelley Wyatt as Charlotte Cecil, Kelsey Lack as Dolly Granger Jackson, Nina McCoy as Wanda-Sue Johnson, and Vivian Onyekwelu as Ruth Hurdle.
