= Dharmyug =

Hindi pictorial weekly

Dharmyug was a Hindi pictorial weekly published by The Times of India Group from year 1949 till 1993.

25 October 1959 edition's cover page with a painting of goddess Lakshmi by A.A. Almelkar on the occasion of Diwali

== History ==
The magazine was originally published by a Dalmia press in Bombay from 1949, just after independence of India, however it incorporated an earlier pictorial magazine Nav Yug that began in 1932. Later on when the Dalmia group divested its stake from Bennett, Coleman & Co. Ltd. in 1948, Dharmayug remained with the Times of India group. One of its chief editors was Pandit Satyakam Vidyalankar, The magazine became popular and widely read when, in 1960, noted writer-playwright Dharmveer Bharti noted for his play, Andha Yug (1953), was appointed as its Chief Editor. The noted Hindi poet and author served as the chief editor for the magazine from 1960 to 1987. Dharmveer Bharti was a dedicated and widely admired editor, although was sometimes considered to have been authoritative by fellow journalists. After Bharti's retirement, Ganesh Mantri, a Hindi journalist, was appointed Editor, Vishwanath Sachdev took over from Ganesh Mantri, before the Times of India decided to close down the magazine in 1997.

== Contents and significance ==
The magazine covered all disciplines, including literature, art, fashion, culture, fiction, science and comics. (although the name may imply Dharm = faith/duty, yug = age) Serialised stories of many Hindi popular writer and poets were published in the magazine. Dhabbuji, a cartoon character created by Abid Surti, was also a regular feature., besides works of cartoonist, Kaak were regularly featured.

Dharmyug was considered to be the most respected publication of its time. Many distinguished authors got their break into the field when they published in Dharmyug. Dharmyug also provided a beginning to painters like J.P. Singhal, who published his first painting in Dharmayug in 1954.

It was a sad end to the saga of a Hindi magazine that once sold more than four lakh copies a week and gave a platform to many new Hindi writers and poets, like Mrinal Pande and Rajesh Joshi. The magazine was the first to serialize that tremendous milestone of Hindi and Indian theater Aadhe Adhure by Mohan Rakesh, as well as the first to publish stories of Shivani.

== See also ==
- Life magazine 1883 to 1972
- The Illustrated Weekly of India 1880-1993 also published by Times of India
