= Memory play =

Type of theatrical performance

A memory play is a play in which a lead character narrates the events of the play, which are drawn from the character's memory. The term was coined by playwright Tennessee Williams, describing his work The Glass Menagerie. In his production notes, Williams says, "Being a 'memory play', The Glass Menagerie can be presented with unusual freedom of convention." In a widening of the definition, it has been argued that Harold Pinter's plays Old Times, No Man's Land and Betrayal are memory plays, where "memory becomes a weapon". Brian Friel's Dancing at Lughnasa is a late 20th-century example of the genre.

== The Glass Menagerie ==
In the script, Williams describes the scene:

The scene is memory and is therefore non-realistic. Memory takes a lot of poetic license. It omits some details; others are exaggerated, according to the emotional value of the articles it touches, for memory is seated predominantly in the heart. The interior is therefore rather dim and poetic.

In his first few lines Tom Wingfield declares:

The play is memory. Being a memory play, it is dimly lighted, it is sentimental, it is not realistic. In memory everything seems to happen to music. That explains the fiddle in the wings. I am the narrator of the play, and also a character in it. The other characters are my mother Amanda, my sister Laura and a gentleman caller who appears in the final scenes.

The action of the play is loosely based on Williams' own memories. The narrator, Tom Wingfield, moves in and out of the action, directly addressing the audience at times. The other characters Amanda and Laura also revisit their own memories throughout. Williams' plays A Streetcar Named Desire and Summer and Smoke are also referred to as memory plays.

== Other examples ==
Dharamveer Bharti wrote Suraj Ka Satvan Ghoda in 1952. It was adapted on screen by Shyam Benegal in 1992 as a film of the same name.

The 1970s works of Harold Pinter, including Landscape, Silence, A Kind of Alaska, Betrayal and Old Times have been described by Michael Billington and others as memory plays. Characters recite their own versions of past events and there is no clear indication of which, if any, is true. In Friel's Dancing at Lughnasa, "a memory play focusing on the five unmarried Mundy sisters who struggle to maintain the family home ... The memory controlling the play's shape and substance belongs to Michael, the 'love child' of Chris, youngest of the sisters." Critic Irving Wardle has argued that Friel invented the modern memory play, citing Philadelphia, Here I Come! and Faith Healer as examples. The play, Da, by Hugh Leonard is another example of a memory play.

The term has also been used to describe film, such as John Ford's The Man Who Shot Liberty Valance, described by Scott Eyman as containing "under-populated sets" and "archetypal characters". In a 2007 essay entitled "Some Memory Plays Before the 'Memory Play'", academic and director Attilio Favorini identifies Ibsen, Strindberg, Pirandello and O'Neill as early 20th-century exponents of the memory play, arguing the influence of Freud and Jung on their work.

== Bibliography ==
- Williams, Tennessee (1945). The Glass Menagerie. Penguin. ISBN 978-0-141-19026-6.
