= Aaru Sundarimaarude Katha =

- Theatrical Release poster
- Directed by: Rajesh K. Abraham
- Screenplay by: Rajesh K. Abraham; Senni Varghese
- Story by: Rajesh K. Abraham
- Produced by: A. V. Anoop
- Starring: Nadhiya; Lena; Lakshmi Rai; Zarina Wahab; Shamna Kasim; Umang Jain
- Cinematography: Sameer Haq
- Edited by: Praveen Prabhakar
- Music by: Deepak Dev
- Release date: 17 May 2013
- Country: India
- Language: Malayalam

Aaru Sundarimaarude Katha (English: A Tale of Six Women), abbreviated as ASK, is a 2013 Malayalam thriller film directed by Rajesh K. Abraham. Umang Jain, Nadhiya, Zarina Wahab, Lena, Shamna Kasim and Lakshmi Rai are in the lead. The screenplay is by Rajesh K. Abraham and Senni Varghese. Sameer Haq handled the camera. Music by Deepak Dev and choreography by Imithiyas Aboobacker.

== Plot ==
Aaru Sundarimarude Katha tells the story of six women whose destinies affect each other as they bond together for their respective families in the face of adversities which includes the murder of one among these.

== Cast ==
- Nadhiya as Rose Moothedan
- Lena as Cyns Ria
- Lakshmi Rai as Fouzia Hassan
- Zarina Wahab as Chachi Moothedan
- Shamna Kasim as Meena Sreekumar
- Umang Jain as Anju Moothedan
- Narain as Sreekumar
- Prathap Pothen as Alex Paul
- Deepak Parambol as Lalu
- Govind Padmasoorya as Raja
- Arjun Nandhakumar as Jai

== Reception ==
Rajeevan of Metromatinee.com commented that "Rajesh Abraham proves that he is a talent to recon with if he continues to make movies that feel similar to how the first half of Aaru Sundarimarude Katha unfolds. The characters are introduced in a very engaging manner and the movie proceeds at a brisk and intriguing pace though the latter half disappoints." Veeyen of Nowrunning.com rated the film 2/5 and said, "Aaru Sunadarimarude Katha did have some real excellent thriller potential, but it hopelessly loses itself working up just the bare-minimum requirements of a thriller. The result is that it feels generic..." Sudheer Shah of Indiaglitz.com rated the film 5.75/10 and stated, "The problem with the movie is an overambitious script which tries to hold together too many subjects- ranging from the new generation gadgets, social networking sites, infidelity perils and finally a murder mystery. But the debutante director has almost managed to keep things under control and uses the best of the techniques to make things work. His packaging is the sole thing that helps the movie to tide over many inconsequential sequences discussing disloyalty and moral lessons on the use of Internet."

== First finger dance performance in a film ==
The film was recognized by the Limca Book of Records for featuring finger dance for the first time in cinema. The award is granted to the movie as part of 100 years celebration of Indian Cinema. About the concept director Rajesh K Abraham says, " Chatting as it happens is a dance of fingers hitting the keypads and so it was conceived as finger dance". For this film the unique theme was composed and performed by Imithiyas Aboobacker an internationally acclaimed Choreographer and finger dancer.
