= Shakal Pe Mat Ja =

- Directed by: Shubh Mukherjee
- Written by: Shubh Mukherjee
- Produced by: Ipix Movies; Linc Entertainment; Saritaa Deepak Jalan; Co-Produced by Hrishitaa Bhatt
- Starring: Shubh Mukherjee; Saurabh Shukhla; Raghubir Yadav; Aamna Sharif; Zakhir Hussain; Umang Jain; Pratik; Katare; Chitrak Bandyopadhyay; Harsh Parekh; Mushtaq Khan; Joy Sen Gupta; Aditya Lakhia
- Cinematography: Sahir Raza
- Edited by: Nipun Ashok Gupta
- Music by: Nitin Kumar Gupta; Salim–Sulaiman; Amar Mohile; Honey Singh
- Distributed by: Reliance Entertainment
- Release date: 18 November 2011
- Country: India
- Language: Hindi

Shakal Pe Mat Ja (transl. Don't judge me by my face) is a comic drama film, directed by Shubh Mukherjee. The film stars Shubh Mukherjee, Saurabh Shukhla, Raghubir Yadav, Aamna Sharif, Zakhir Hussain, Umang Jain, Pratik, Katare, Chitrak Bandyopadhyay, Harsh Parekh, Mushtaq Khan, Joy Sen Gupta, Aditya Lakhia. The movie was released in India on 18 November 2011.

== Story ==
Shakal Pe Mat Ja is the story of four young boys who get caught up as suspects at the Delhi international airport on a high alert day. They get caught while capturing an American Airlines aircraft landing on their camera, which they claim to have shot for a documentary that they are making.

With their explanation and situation not being fruitful, they are brought into the interrogation room of the international airport to be questioned by the CISF.

With looks that are totally anti-terrorist, these simple guys get into crazy trouble, as their holdup doesn't turn up the way anyone expected. After all, looks are deceptive. Everything that they say, possess, or even do leads them to further obstacles. Whether it's the suspicious footage of the boys being at Rashtriya pati bhawan or the Arabic and Pakistani porn that they find in Rohan's bag, whether it's the bomb-like-looking device in Dhruv's bag, which he states to be his physics project, or the fact that the 27-year-old Bulai, who resembles a most wanted terrorist and doesn't carry any ID or even a cell phone. At the same time, the intelligence has reports that a group of terrorists are planning some sort of an attack. Do these 4 guys have any involvement with the terror group, or do they have different plans altogether?

Are looks always deceptive? Could these four innocent-looking guys be hard-core terrorists involved in one of the biggest terror plans? Shakal Pe Mat Ja is a film that deals with all such deceptive goof-ups, mistaken identities, and madness created due to being there at the wrong place at the wrong time. Innocent-looking maniacs, amateur terror groups, and security forces who are never on time is what Shakal Pe Mat Ja is all about!

== Cast ==
- Shubh Mukherjee as Ankit Sharma
- Pratik Katare as Dhruv Sharma
- Harsh Parekh as Bulai
- Chitrak Bandyopadhyay as Rohan Malhotra
- Raghuvir Yadav as Omprakash
- Saurabh Shukla as ATS Chauhaan
- Umang Jain as Prachi
- Aamna Sharif as Amina
- Zakhir Hussain as Omama (Terrorist)

== Box Office Report ==
With a total box office collection of just 6.5 million Indian Rupees, after the first week, the film flopped at the box office. The film failed to generate positive response from critics because of its lack of publicity and distribution plans.
