= Babul Ka Aangann Chootey Na =

- Written by: Anshuman Sinha
- Directed by: Ratnaa Sinha
- Starring: See below
- Opening theme: "Babul Ka Aangann Chootey Na" by Alka Yagnik
- Country of origin: India
- No. of episodes: 208

Production
- Running time: 23 minutes

Original release
- Network: Sony Entertainment Television
- Release: 21 January 2008 – 5 February 2009

Babul Ka Aangann Chootey Na is an Indian television series which aired on Sony Entertainment Television India.

== Plot ==
The story is based on the life of a 24-year-old woman, Aastha, who belongs to a middle class family and lives with her father and siblings - an older brother who feels little responsibility towards his family and dreams of settling in the US, a sister who is carefree and wants to move out and become an actress and a younger sister who is disabled and depends on her family. In such a scenario, Aastha decides to defer getting married since there would be no one to take care of her father and youngest sister.

Aastha takes up a job at the Ranawat Hotel where her boss Shubh falls in love with her and asks her father for her hand in marriage. He assures Aastha that he will help her look after her parents and that she would be able to shoulder their responsibility even after marriage. Shubh and Aastha are married and as she becomes the daughter-in-law of the rich Ranawat family, Aastha has to constantly find ways to balance the responsibilities of a daughter and a daughter-in-law. Her first test is when she has to perform a dangerous ritual to protect the Ranawat family from a "curse" under the aegis of Shubh's grandfather at their ancestral palace. At the ritual, the secret behind the death of Shubh's grandmother is revealed. Later that night, Aastha's sister Shilpa, who was travelling with the Ranawats is raped at their palace and suspicion falls on Shubh. However, Aastha and Shubh's friend Veeru takes the blame.

Aastha and Shubh, with Veeru's help, investigate and play an elaborate charade faking Shubh's death and scaring Mahen, Shubh's brother-in-law and his sister Deepa's husband, to finally confess to the rape. They reveal his truth before the family and he is sent to prison.

Another twist in the plot occurs when Aastha is kidnapped and her look-alike Payal arrives. Payal destroys the relationship between Aastha and Shubh to get back at Shubh's older brother Swayam who she had fallen in love with. Payal marries Swayam by making everyone think she is Aastha. Swayam, who didn't know who Aastha was in the first place, believes her to be Payal. Later, Payal pretends to like Shubh just to create a rift between Shubh and Swayam. However, Swayam is soon stabbed to death by Payal because he was getting in the way of her plans. Later on, when Payal was about to remarry Shubh, the kidnapper reveals everything and brings the real Aastha to Shubh. A fight ensues.

Eventually, it is revealed that the real culprit behind both Swayam and Shubh's murders is their own brother Saksham. Shubh's mother Sulochana wants to hand over Saksham to the police after he tries to kill a pregnant Aastha but Aastha pleads on his behalf. Saksham's wife Anoushka, who had so far hated Aastha and mistreated her, has a change of heart and apologises to Aastha. In a bid to do right by the family, she herself calls the police and Saksham is arrested. The story ends with Aastha and Sulochana embracing and waiting for Aastha and Shubh's child to fulfil the vacuum in their lives.

== Cast ==
=== Main ===
- Sidharth Shukla as Shubh Ranawat
- Aastha Chaudhary as Aastha Shubh Ranawat / Payal Swayam Ranawat

=== Recurring ===
- Div Punamiya as Sonu
- Rahil Azam / Vikas Sethi as Swayam Ranawat, Shubh's elder brother
- Faizan Kidwai as Saksham Ranawat, Shubh's third brother
- Vaishali Melanie Nazareth as Anushka Saksham Ranawat, Saksham's wife
- Vijay Kashyap as Purnendu Joshi, Aastha's father
- Talluri Rameshwari as Rukmini Purnendu Joshi, Aastha's mother
- Mehul Kajaria as Vinay Joshi, Aastha's brother
- Itishree Singh as Shilpa Joshi, Aastha's second sister
- Sana Saeed as Chhaya Joshi, Aastha's youngest sister
- Raja Bundela as Vanraj Ranawat, Shubh's father
- Navni Parihar as Sulochana Vanraj Ranawat, Shubh's mother
- Sumit Arora as Pratham Ranawat, Shubh's second brother
- Farhana Parveen as Aditi Ranawat, Pratham's wife
- Shalini Khanna as Deepa Mahen Mehra, Shubh's sister
- Nishant Shokeen as Mahen Mehra, Deepa's husband
- Aarti Dave as Maya Sahni
- Adi Irani as Mark Kapoor
- Gautam Rode as Lakhan Malik
- Shriya Bisht as Priyanka
- Gaurav Gera as Babban Bhai
