= Sana Saeed =

Indian actress and model

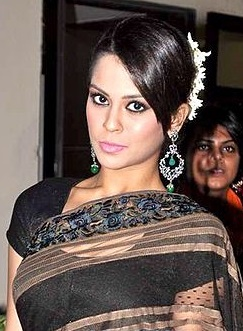
- Saeed at the Global Peace Fashion Show, 2013
- Born: 22 September 1988 (age 38); Mumbai, Maharashtra, India
- Occupations: Actress; Model
- Years active: 1998–present
- Partner(s): Csaba Wagner (2021—present; engaged)

Sana Saeed (born 22 September 1988) is an Indian actress and model, who primarily appears in Bollywood films and Indian television. Her first appearance was as a child artist in Kuch Kuch Hota Hai (1998) and continued to do so in films like Har Dil Jo Pyar Karega (2000) and Badal (2000). She also appeared in television shows such as Babul Ka Aangann Chootey Na (2008) and Lo Ho Gayi Pooja Iss Ghar Ki (2008).

In 2012, Saeed made her big screen debut as an adult in a supporting role in Karan Johar's Student Of The Year, which emerged as a box-office commercial success. She participated in the reality shows Jhalak Dikhhla Jaa 6 (2013), Nach Baliye 7 (2015) and Fear Factor: Khatron Ke Khiladi 7 (2016).

== Career ==
She has appeared as a child artist in critically and commercially successful films such as Kuch Kuch Hota Hai (1998), Badal (2000) and Har Dil Jo Pyar Karega (2000). Saeed also hosted the kids program Fox Kids telecasted on Star Plus in which she played the role of Chatur Chachi. She also appeared in television shows such as Babul Ka Aangann Chootey Na on Sony Entertainment Television and Lo Ho Gayi Pooja Iss Ghar Ki on SAB TV.

She came sixth in the dance reality show and was praised for her energy levels in dancing. Jhalak Dikhla Jaa.

In 2012, She made her screen debut in a supporting role in Karan Johar's Student Of The Year along with the main leads Sidharth Malhotra, Varun Dhawan and Alia Bhatt. She got noticed due to her child star memory in spite of her small role. Film critic Taran Adarsh from Bollywood Hungama wrote, "Sana Saaed looks glamorous and does well". Film critic Komal Nahta commented, "Sana Saeed only gets to pout and flaunt her body as Tanya." Boxofficeindia.com declared the film as a semi-hit after three weeks. She placed 5th in Nach Baliye 7.

In 2024, Saeed made her American film debut by starring in Welcome to Klyde's Kitchen, alongside Beau Bridges and his son, Ezekiel Bridges. She played the role of Durga.

== Personal life ==
In January 2023, Sana got engaged to Csaba Wagner and now resides in Los Angeles. In July 2026, Saeed stated that she had fully recovered from a long term struggle with Bulimia nervosa, which she had experienced since her youth.

== Filmography ==
=== Films ===
Year	Title	Role	Notes
1998	Kuch Kuch Hota Hai	Anjali Khanna	Child artist
2000	Badal	Preeti	Child artist
2000	Har Dil Jo Pyar Karega	Special appearance	Child artist
2012	Student Of The Year	Tanya Israni	
2014	Fugly	—	Song: "Lovely Jind Wali"
2014	Caught In The Web	Herself	Short film
2024	Welcome to Klyde's Kitchen	Durga	American Short Film

=== Television ===
Year	Title	Role	Notes
2001–2003	Fox Kids	Chatur Chachi	
2002–2003	Kumkum – Ek Pyara Sa Bandhan	Anjali	
2003	Kahiin To Hoga	Sakshi	
2004	Hey...Yehii To Haii Woh!	Deepika	
2005	Saat Phere: Saloni Ka Safar	Sara	
2006	Kkavyanjali	Herself	Guest
2007	Sapna Babul Ka... Bidaai	Riya	
2008	Babul Ka Aangann Chootey Na	Chaaya Joshi	
2008–2009	Lo Ho Gayi Pooja Iss Ghar Ki	Pooja	
2009–2010	Sajan Ghar Jaana Hai	Priya	
2010	Dhoondh Legi Manzil Humein	Herself	Guest
2011	Sasural Genda Phool	Shweta	
2012	Bigg Boss 6	Herself	Guest
2013	Jhalak Dikhhla Jaa 6	Contestant	6th place
2013	MTV Splitsvilla	Herself	Guest
2013	Yeh Hai Aashiqui	Nandini	
2014	Jhalak Dikhhla Jaa 7	Herself	Guest
2015	Nach Baliye 7	Contestant	5th place
2016	Fear Factor: Khatron Ke Khiladi 7	Contestant	1st runner-up
2017	Jhalak Dikhhla Jaa 9	Herself	Guest
2018	Laal Ishq	Maya Sharma	
2018	Comedy Circus	Herself	
2019	Khatra Khatra Khatra	Herself	Guest
2019	Kitchen Champion 5	Herself	Guest
2022	The Khatra Khatra Show	Herself	Guest
