= Ek Tha Chander Ek Thi Sudha =

Indian television series broadcast on Life OK

- Genre: Drama
- Created by: Ashwni Dhir
- Based on: Gunahon Ka Devta by Dharamvir Bharati
- Starring: See below
- Country of origin: India
- Original language: Hindi
- No. of seasons: 1
- No. of episodes: 20

Production
- Producer: Ashwni Dhir
- Production locations: Mumbai, Maharashtra, India
- Camera setup: Multi-camera
- Production company: Garima Productions

Original release
- Network: Life Ok
- Release: 21 September – 16 October 2015

Ek Tha Chandar Ek Thi Sudha (English: One was Chander one was Sudha) is an Indian television series, which premiered on 21 September 2015 and is broadcast on Life OK. The series is produced by Ashwni Dhir's Garima Productions and aired every Monday to Friday night. The series is a tragic love story and is a 20-episode series based on Dharamvir Bharati’s iconic 1949 novel, Gunahon Ka Devta. Rahil Azam and Umang Jain appeared in lead roles.

== Plot ==
A man tells an awaiting lady to keep this flower in his feet, everything will be fine. The lady takes the flower and lays them at the feet of a girl in bed. She whispers the name Chandar. The doctor tells her father that the poison has spread in her body, Sudha is in a weak condition, but if she can stay alive for 2 more hours then she'll live. Sudha gains consciousness but doesn't remember anyone. She loves the rain and it starts to rain outside, so the doctor tells them to take her on the porch. Chandar comes in a car. Sudha looks at the car, then sits still.

=== Flashback ===
A teacher takes roll call. Sudha runs to the class late, then creeps to her seat from beneath the chairs. The teacher calls Sudha's name, Sudha raises her hand along with the shoe that she held in her hand not to make a noise. The teacher asks why she is showing her a show, Sudha says it broke. Everyone laughs, the teacher tells her to sit down. Sudha sits with a group of three girls. The teacher begins the lecture, Sudha is caught again talking by the teacher. The teacher says that this is the girls of today. Sudha was eating spinach that her friend had brought and had it in hand, she tells upon teacher's query that it was brought by Geesu, her friend. The teacher asks Geesu to stand up. She questions if they both eat spinach in the class, if they are girls or goats. She calls them both in the front, and sends them out of the class and shut the doors, they abide by her. Sudha opens the door again and says this way they won't be able to attend the class, the teacher reassures that this is what she has punished her with. Both the friends run excitedly.

In the corridor, Sudha tells Geesu she is going to station as Chandar is coming. In the train, a young man sat with her notebook open. He read a letter and smiles thinking how Sudha came to him and asked him to put thread in needle. Chandar wasn't ready, but Sudha had snatched his book from him. He put the thread in the needle while Sudha helps him in it. He takes his book back and regrets he has lost the page. Sudha questions why he doesn't keep a book mark in it? Chandar asks where to bring a bookmark now, Sudha had written a note behind her photo, "Don’t look here and there and concentrate on your book." She had said that she will also be there to take care of him.

Sudha travelled in the car towards the station. She comes down the car while Chandar comes out of the train. The train arrive at the station. Sudha lay her head on the track to hear the sound of the train arriving, then watches it coming. The passengers prepare the leave. Chandar comes out of the train, no one was there to welcome him. He comes down. Sudha runs to him from behind, stops him and smiles. He doesn't stop and leaves instead towards a group of drummers who were there to welcome him. He says to Thakkur what this is, Thakkur says Chandar has returned with a trophy for him, a celebration was a must. Sudha was left behind waiting.

At home, floral decorations had been made. A lady scolded the men for playing Holi here. Sudha's papa arrive, he gives the lady sweet box saying his Chandar is coming after winning a trophy. The lady comes behind Papa and asks what kind of Topi (Cap) this is for which Sudha also brought sweet. Papa explains it is a gift. There is horn outside, a car arrives and Sudha comes in alone, red in rage. Papa asks where is Chandar. Sudha says she doesn't know, she was crying and says he must scold him when he arrives, she had been waiting for him on station and he didn't look at her, instead he left the station.

The boys brought Chandar to university hooting and shouting about the victory of Chandar. Chandar was welcomed, his friend Thakkur boasted in front of everyone that he won trophy in Delhi. Thakkur asks them all to give way to Chandar, they have to celebrate as well.

Sudha tells Mai (the lady at house) to put in more milk in Chandar's milk. At least he must remember he had promised someone else. Geesu comes home with rose bunch and says this is for her to bring smile on her face. She asks Sudha if she had a fight with someone.

Chandar comes to stage, he makes a speech which makes everyone laugh. They all clap in appreciation. Thankkur tells Chandar he must meet Billu. Chandar asks now? And looks at time.

Sudha was crying and asks Geesu why Chandar does so, he knew there is Pooja at home. Why he didn't come to Pooja and went with his friends. Geesu says she is sure he will soon come home. Kamini and Prabha also come home, they come and notices Sudha has high fever. Sudha was still upset.

Chandar meets his teacher, his teacher says there is a fire in Chandar and he must not let it out. His college needs such a light. Chandar says he was a lost person, his teachers have made him what he is. The teacher says a teacher is only a teacher when he gets an eligible student. He says he sees a shadow on himself in Chandar and wants him to succeed. He must take care of one think, he must never leave his brought up, and must never forget those who owed him. He will be successful. Anyone can be a man, it takes a cost to become a Dev.

Pandit ji asks to begin the pooja, Papa asks about Sudha who asks to wait for just a little while. Their family is incomplete without Chandar. Papa leaves, Mai asks him where is Sudha. Papa says Sudha says without Chandar, this family is incomplete. For him, without Chandar and Sudha both the family is incomplete. Sudha awaits Chandar.

Chandar comes back home. Ramu kaka welcomes him. Chandar comes to meet Papa and apologizes him. Papa says he knows only one person can forgive them in this house. He asks about Sudha. Mai comes to tell them Sudha has locked herself in the room. Chandar tells Papa not to worry and goes inside the corridor. He remembers making up Sudha like this always since childhood. He remember how Sudha had hurt her head once before. He knocks at the door, and politely asks Sudha to open the door and if she doesn't open the door he will break the door. She knows well the door is strong and he will be hurt. He struggles for once, but Sudha opens the door on his second try. He comes inside to look at Sudha and asks isn't she ready till yet. He says she looks good even this way. He says he has told everyone he will bring her, won't she keep his promise. Sudha says he always does this to her, he always want to win over her but today she won't listen to him.

Chandar asks won't she listen to him? She turns around and says she didn't listen to her father, who is he then. Chandar comes out of the house alone. Papa asks where is Sudha, Sudha appears from behind Chandar. Everyone is happy to see her all dressed up.

Everyone is happy to see Sudha, the pooja begins. Chandar and Sudha enjoy the pooja rituals. Sudha brings Prasad to Papa who was with a friend, the friend detects that Sudha has fever. Papa and his friend asks Sudha to go and take rest, Sudha resists. Papa calls Chandar and he insists on Sudha to go inside. Sudha comes inside angry, her friends also come in asking what happened. Sudha says she has a light fever, today is festivity and there will be music and dance but Chandar sent her inside. They hear the drums outside, the girls come to terrace. Sudha watches Chandar dancing and says she knows a calming therapy that lets fever vanish. She teaches her friends about the verses, and says they must keep repeating these verses without opening their eyes. They ask what nonsense this is. Sudha says Chandar taught this to her. They think it must be right one then. They do so, Sudha goes into the kitchen and keeps her head in the freezer. She says her forehead is now normal. She comes out, Papa says her forehead is cold, in fact it is cold more than normal. She goes to dance. Chandar asks Sudha's friends how she got rid of her fever so soon, they tell him about the therapy. He is shocked to see this, but they say he had taught this himself. Chandar looks at Sudha who was feeling dizzy and faints. Papa calls for a doctor.

Doctor observes Sudha and tells Papa it is just a fever, nothing else. He writes medicine for Sudha and asks Chandar to keep cold cloth on Sudha's forehead. He takes Papa out with him. Chandar sits with Sudha. Outside, the doctor says to Mr. Shukla that he worries so soon. Papa says he will know only if he will have a daughter. The doctor asks if he must marry in this age. Papa jokes who will marry him. He tells Mr. Shukla that he is in hurry right now, as his patients have been waiting. They promise to meet in club.

Sudha wakes up and asks Chandar if he is angry. Chandar says it is about getting angry. Sudha sits up and says she is also angry with him. He must have come home straight. He says his friends took him from station and asks Sudha how she got rid of her fever. Sudha says didn't be bring trophy. Chandar says she will show it to her father first. Sudha asks him to go and ask Papa how the fever was gone. She asks for trophy. He points at it. She picks the trophy and cheers. He says he is still angry at her, she doesn't listen to him and leaves. Sudha stands behind, she says wouldn't he ask how she got this fever. Chandar returns and asks how. She says she kept on standing at station, but he left with his friends. She cries. Chandar apologizes her. Sudha turns to him, he says she doesn't look good crying. She wipes her tears, he asks her how she got rid of her fever. Sudha says she can show it to him, and tells him to shut his eyes. She takes him to kitchen, his eyes still shut. They come to freezer, she tells him to bend into the freezer, opens his eyes and is shocked to see. Sudha laughs. Chandar asks if she has gone crazy. Sudha says he had also kept cold cloth on her forehead soaked in ice, she instead placed her head on ice. Chandar leaves.

Chandar gives a pen to Mr. Shukla that could be refilled without getting hands stained with ink. Mr. Shukla is happy and asks Chandar to show him the trophy. He hugs Chandar congratulating him about it, he says he really boasts up when he gets successful. He says Sudha had also been waiting for him, and asks how Sudha is. Chandar says she is fine. Mr. Shukla says he doesn't get when Sudha will leave this childish attitude, then tells Chandar to take trophy home and decorate it. He decorates it on a rack there and says this is home. Mr. Shukla tells him not to leave without having dinner.

Chandar comes home, and watches Sudha's photo with her autograph.

In the morning, Chandar stood at the lake side. Papa comes out there praying. He watches Chandar standing there and comes to him. Chandar takes his blessings. Pandit ji tells Mr. Shukla that Chandar comes even before sun rise. Papa asks him to give an opportunity to him at least once that he arrives before Chandar. Chandar says that Mr. Shukla has given him opportunities every time in life, he never let Chandar realize that he isn't actually a part of his family. Mr. Shukla and Chandar sit for a while where Mr. Shukla discuss with Chandar and says that he has taken all his responsibilities but sometimes he is worried about Sudha as she is growing up. He says that Sudha has grown up but her childish behavior doesn't go away. He could never scold Sudha as she has no mother. Chandar tells him that good people always get good. Mr. Shukla says he has never done anything wrong in life deliberately. Chandar says if they sit for some more time here they will both get scolded by Sudha. Mr. Shukla watches the time, it was 7.30.

Sudha shouts for Mai saying she has head ache. Mai watched over all the household. Papa and Chandar stand there, Papa asks her to give him tea when she is spared by scolding everyone. Mai says she is taking oil for Sudha, as she has a head ache. Sudha asks Mai to put in oil well, Mai scolds her that her Papa and Chandar are there downstairs waiting for her. Sudha takes oil and says she will get it done by Chandar.

Chandar was reading a book. Sudha tells him to put in oil in her hair. Chandar says he is busy right now. Sudha says he has always put in oil in her head since childhood. Chandar says she has grown up now. Sudha asks doesn't grownups have headaches. She suggests Chandar put in oil in her head and tell her poems as well. Chandar says neither he will put in oil nor will he tell her a poem. Last time he had got lice from her hair. Sudha gets angry and leaves, Chandar asks for a cup of tea. Sudha was angry, Chandar comes out, begins reading the poetry and takes the oil bowl. Sudha smiles and sits on the chair, as Chandar massages her head. Mr. Shukla who was hearing the poetry says that is really beautiful. Chandar asks if he heard this? Mr. Shukla says it has been published in newspaper, his friend also called him for appreciating for his poems. Sudha gets up from the chair and asks Chandar from mid of the poem. Chandar says he had told her the whole. Chandar and Papa says she had fallen asleep. Sudha says that it is Chandar's mistake, he tells her such boring poem. Chandar says it is her mistake, she doesn't concentrate on Hindi literature. Sudha and Chandar blame each other. Papa says it is no one's mistake, but his. He shouldn't have brought fridge at home, if she thinks he wouldn't get to know. Mai also scolds Sudha, Papa says he is speaking to her about it. Mai is irked and leaves again shouting at the servants. Papa asks who does so, fridge is to cool water not head. Sudha tries to give an explanation but Papa asks her to get ready for college. Chandar says he will drop her to college. Papa scolds Chandar that Sudha is so irresponsible only because of him.

Sudha and Geesu lie on the ground of college. Sudha says to Geesu that she won't marry else who will take care of her Papa. Geesu asks what she will do if she won't marry. Sudha asks about Akhtar, Geesu says he is fine but now comes home less and in dreams more. Sudha says her situation is really bad, he doesn't walk on ground now. They both laugh saying her shoe has broken. A fellow comes and tells Sudha that her teacher is going to take her complain to home. Sudha is worried and says she is going to Chandar.

Some boys watch Sudha come to university and asks whom is she looking for. Sudha asks for Chandar, the boys make him take a seat and sends for Chandar. Chandar is worried and asks Sudha what happened, Sudha says she broke her shoe. Chandar asks if he is cobbler. Sudha says he got it made last time, Chandar says alright he will go with her.

Chandar and Sudha reach the cobbler, Sudha scolds him and instructs him about making the shoe. Chandar tells Sudha to be calm, he is doing it. Sudha still instructs him about repairing the shoe. Chandar gives him money. The cobbler tells Chandar that if it breaks again, he must bring the shoe only and not this girl. Sudha and Chandar leave.

At home, Sudha and Chandar watch a cycle outside. Mai tells Sudha her teacher has arrived. Sudha gets worried. Chandar comes inside telling Papa not to believe what the teacher is saying, Papa gets worried and clueless.

Sudha explains Chandar that this teacher is always jealous with girls as she couldn't get married. She requests Chandar to save her, Chandar says that it is just for once.

Inside the room, teacher was hopeful that Mr. Shukla will help her. Chandar comes and asks Mr. Shukla to listen to him before her, she is thinking all wrong. The teacher asks who is he. Mr. Shukla says he is Chandar, is like their family member. The teacher asks why Chandar was saying that she doesn't think well.

Outside, Sudha flattens the tyre of her teacher's cycle.

Inside, Chandar says that whatever she is saying isn't true. The teacher hands Chandar a booklet and says she writes poems and has prepared a collection of poetry and wants him to publish this book. Mr. Shukla says that Chandar himself is a good writer and can suggest if this book is worth publishing or not. The teacher says she is hopeful about his help. Chandar says he will drop her out, but she says she will go by herself. The teacher appreciates the view outside Mr. Shukla's house. Chandar points that her tyre has gone flat. The teacher urges outside before can no longer be moved. Mai stood there and tells Chandar Sudha didn't listen to her.

Chandar comes in Sudha's room, Sudha was studying intently. Chandar asks why she flattened her cycle's tyre. Sudha asks Chandar what she had said. Chandar says she complained a lot about her. Sudha tells him to listen to all her chapters, if she doesn't study how she can remember each and everything. Chandar says he doesn't want to listen, Sudha takes the book in her hand and tells him about the chapter. Chandar takes the book and asks her about Ammonia's description. Sudha gets it as Pneumonia. Sudha makes up that this wasn't the last chapter she studied. She asks Chandar if he will keep on standing here or go and talk to Papa that he doesn't scold her. Chandar calls Ramu, tells Sudha to sit and listen to all what he says from now, he will take care of all else. Sudha says she had already asked him to get her a library card, she will only study if she will have books. Chandar goes saying he will get it made.

Next morning, Sudha comes downstairs calling Mai. She wonders why everything so silent is. This means it is nothing to get tensed. She comes out to see Papa scolding the servants why they didn't water plants for three days. He warns them to get responsible and tells them to leave. He turns to Mai and asks where Sudha is. Sudha goes to hide behind a pillar, she thinks it isn't out of danger to come to Papa right now. She thinks about going to sit and study, this way she will get saved.

Mai comes inside to scold Ramukaka now. Sudha comes with her books, she stops Mai from shouting. She tells Mai that she has a head ache and asks her to send ginger tea in her room. Mai asks can't she make it herself. Sudha heads towards her room upstairs saying she is going to study. Papa was coming down the stairs. He watches Sudha going from the other staircase and asks where she is going. Sudha says she is going to roof with books. Papa says to Sudha that she always wanders with books, if she ever studies. Sudha comes down saying she knows it all and begins to revise everything in front of him. Sudha tells her Papa not to concentrate on her teacher's words. Her Papa says that her teacher has made a very good collection of poems, he will publish it for sure. Sudha wonders about the poetry collection. Her papa says this is the reason she came here, didn't Chandar tell her. Sudha remembers what Chandar had told her and is curt at him. Papa calls Mai to make tea for him as well and leaves. Sudha murmurs that she won't leave Chandar.

A veiled lady comes to Sudha's home calling Sudha. Sudha comes downstairs. Geesu asks why she called her here. Sudha says she wants to go to university, Geesu asks doesn't she want to go to college, and what is in university. Geesu asks whom is she going to scold. Sudha says Chandar, who else can it be. She tells Chandar what he did to her. Geesu teases Sudha, Sudha runs behind Geesu. Both laugh together.

In the library, a girl comes across Chandar and drops his books. Chandar collects them and heads to leave. The girl stops him and tries to flirt with him. She tries to flirt with Chandar, Thakkur comes to save Chandar. Chandar tells Thakur he had to take some books for Sudha. Geesu and Sudha sit on the Tonga, they tell him to take them to university. Geesu was getting emotional, Sudha says this is all because she has come after meeting her husband. Geesu says she is also being emotional and all her emotions are linked to Chandar. Sudha tells her to shut up.

Thakkur asks Chandar if that girl is the same who came for sandal repair, she comes to drop him or he goes drop her. There is something going between them both. Chandar takes Thakkur by collar. Everyone turns to look at them. Chandar takes Thakkur's collar and warns him not to ruin the reputation of the girl, not every relation is named as the same. Thakkur looks around, tells people to do their work. He tells Chandar to leave his collar, smoke always comes from the place of fire and asks Chandar to look behind. Sudha stood behind. Thakkur leaves, Chandar goes out towards Sudha and opens the library door. He asks what she is doing here. Sudha stammers first, then says she came to get her library card made. Chandar asks her to come inside, this way she at least came to library else she doesn't like study. Sudha doesn't lower her voice in the library, Chandar warns her to stay silent. The librarian comes there, Sudha hides behind Chandar. Chandar tells him they want a card, he points at his back but when he turns, Sudha wasn't there. She had already taken a seat. Chandar brings Sudha and introduces her as Mr. Shukla's daughter. The librarian asks Sudha her name, Sudha whispers. He couldn't listen, Sudha speaks aloud saying he told her not to speak aloud. He asks for a photo, Sudha says she didn't bring a photo and recalls it is there inside Chandar's book. The librarian mocks at this. He tells Sudha to send a photo, Chandar will stick it. Then she must not worry, and come straight to the library and take her books. Sudha asks Chandar to remind her to take her books. The librarian laughs at it. They leave.

In the evening, Sudha was reading when Chandar cycles towards her home. Chandar takes her inside and asks why she didn't ask him and what the need of asking Papa was. Sudha says she asked him, he didn't reply so she was only left with one option. She asks him to tell what the essence of love is. Chandar asks what kind of question is this. Sudha says this is the most important question of Hindi literature. Chandar says it is like Dia or Baati... Sudha asks like flower and fragrance. Chandar asks if she is learning or teaching. SUdha says someone can take away anything from flower except its fragrance. Chandar asks why she is eating up her mind when she knows it all. Sudha says because she doesn't get marks if she only writes this. She says she will speak to Papa about it because he couldn't find an answer. Chandar stops her and says he will find one. Chandar calls Bisarya. Bisarya was telling romantic poetry to a group of young men. He says that in the times to come, may be this poetry is used in films but where he would be. Chandar comes looking for Bisarya. The boys warn Bisarya that Chandar is coming, he runs saying he hasn't done anything. Chandar holds him, he says that he has done nothing, but today he has to teach someone. Bisraya agrees saying he will take 12 rupees. Chandar is shocked, Bisarya says he can reduce 20 paisas. Chandar accepts to pay 12 rupees. Bisarya asks where to go, Chandar says Mr. Shukla's home. Bisarya expects Mr. Shukla's daughter to be intelligent, Chandar says not much in studies but she is intelligent in many other things.

The next morning, Chandar wakes Sudha up throwing water, tells her it is nine in morning. Her tutor has come home named Bisarya. Sudha says she wants to sleep. Chandar says if she sleeps now, she will kept sleeping always. Sudha sleeps again.

Downstairs, Mr. Shukla asks Chandar who is there in the drawing room. Chandar says it is Sudha's new tutor. Mr. Shukla asks if he is trusted then apologizes saying he always takes Sudha as someone at home.

Chandar and Bisarya were reading separately, Sudha comes there and whispers Chandar's name. He calls Sudha inside, she goes and hides behind Chandar. Chandar tells her to take a seat. Sudha takes a seat near him her face turned away. Chandar introduces them both, Chandar says he must begin to teach and he will be back soom. Sudha was nervous, she goes behind Chandar and asks him to sit with them. She says she feels shy like this. Chandar insists that her teacher is waiting, Mr. Shukla comes there. Sudha asks Mr. Shukla to ask Chandar sit with her, else she won't study. Chandar says he won't sit, he says Sudha won't be able to study, he must put her to stitching or embroidery. Sudha says she will study and goes inside. She comes to sit in the study room and asks Bisarya to begin.

The postman brings a letter to Chandar. He read it somewhat worried when Mr. Shukla comes. Mr Shukla asks if it is his mother's letter, if she was asking about marriage. Chandar says she wants him to marry so that he gets closer to her again. Mr. Shukla takes Chandar inside, he asks why Chandar's mood is off. Chandar says he hasn't thought about marrying, but his mother. Mr. Shukla says he must begin to think then, a few things must take place in time. Mr. Shukla asks Chandar to hand a letter to his old student Pammi and gives her address to him.

Chandar comes at the given address, park his cycle and looks towards the garden. He sits beside the rose and takes on in hand and is about to smell one when an old man comes to him and grabs him from his collar. Chandar asks him what kind of misbehavior this is, but the old man scolds him for touching his rose. Chandar holds a hand, the old man begins to cry. A young girl runs out of the house concerned for the old man. She was in loose gown, Chandar couldn't get his eyes off. She asks who is he. Chandar says this mad attacked him at once, she asks Baqi who is mad. She asks Chandar to tell her whom to think of as mad. Chandar was speechless.

In the room, Pammi was typing and asks Chandar to sit near him. He comes nearer. She tells him that she doesn't bite, so he must not worry. She says that if she would even cut, he won't complain. She was typing and tells Chandar to take his eyes off her face and change the page. She says he is a complex man, Chandar asks if it is written in the papers. She says he couldn't take his eyes off her face, and mostly men don't watch a girl's face for this long, especially when the girl is like her. She is done with the typing, and asks if he wants something hot. He nods. She goes to light a cigarette. Chandar comes to her and says he was talking about tea, she says she about cigarette. He says it is said, there is fire at one side of cigarette and a fool at the other, and she laughs and agrees.

Chandar comes home and asks where sir is. She says it is where the head is. He heads inside, she goes behind him and asks why he is so fragrant. She says it is some girl's scent. Chandar says she is focusing on something idiotic, she must study. She says she had been studying, Chandar avoids and tells her to study. She shuts her book and asks him. He says he went to get Mr. Shukla's letters typed. Sudha gets it and asks how Pammi is. Chandar says the place was interesting with roses, Pammi is an open minded girl and he liked meeting her, now if she would tell him where Mr. Shukla is. She tells him to go inside.

Mr. Shukla asks Chandar if he liked Pammi, she had married. Chandar says she lives with her brother. Chandar heads to leave, Mr. Shukla asks about his job. He says he has applied in a few placed, even in university. Mr. Shukla says he will get one as he is intelligent, and asks him not to leave without dinner.

Thakkur stops Bisurya and asks about his book. Bisurya asks Thakkur that he is thinking his book's name as Sudhashala. It seems synonymous as Madhushala. Thakkur asks if Sudha is Mr. Shukla's daughter, he warns him not to discuss about Sudha a lot, as Chandar is a bit sensitive taking Sudha.

Sudha gets ready in front of mirror. She ties her braids and says Chandar was saying that Pammi is an open minded girl, she also wants to meet her as she isn't any less. She turns her neck with a style but instead gets a cramp. There Bisurya had arrived her place. Sudha calls Mai but she doesn't come. Sudha comes to Bisurya with her neck turned. He asks what happened to her, but Sudha asks him to teach her. He begins his lesson about love. He stands up while teaching and begins to walk and goes to sit on another sofa a bit away from Sudha. Sudha follows him, and sits beside him again. He stammers, Sudha asks what is written in the poem there. Bisurya asks for water, Sudha goes to bring water and he changes his seat again. Sudha brings water and sits beside him again. Sudha again asks him about what he was teaching. He again changes his seat. Bisurya hears the whistle of Chandar's cycle, Bisurya says he didn't do anything. Chandar joins them, Bisurya explains to Chandar he was talking about love between brothers and sisters. Chandar says that is good, and asks about his poem's title. Bisurya says it isn't what he heard of and takes a leave. Chandar notices Sudha's neck was turned and asks what happened. She says she was practicing to be like Pammi. Chandar phews and holds Sudha's neck to remove her cramp.

Sudha was sitting with the fruit vendor. Mai tells her to come to her and think about cooking them as well. She tells her to cook for her father today. Sudha says she has a test tomorrow, she will make the food tomorrow. She runs outside, but hits Pammi. She is happy to meet her and asks whom she came to meet. She asks about Mr. Shukla and Chandar but none was home, she gives an envelope to Sudha. Sudha asks her name, she introduces her and cheers to know she is Pammi. She drags her inside and tells her to have a cup of tea. They sit together, Sudha tells Pammi that Chandar speaks a lot about her. Pammi asks what he had said. Sudha tells her that he told her Pammi likes cigarette and heads to get a cigar for her. Pammi stops her and appreciates the tea. Sudha tells her that Chandar doesn't like tea at all, he likes it with less milk and strong. He likes books and reading. Pammi fell in thoughts about Chandar.

In the library, Bisurya was thinking, his pencil fell. A man hushes them, Bisurya and Thakkur get down to pick the pencil when a bare legged girl passes by. Chandar sat with his book, Pammi sits on his table with a white rose. Pammi comes to sit on Chandar's table with a white rose, she asks if he is playing a book or playing with it. Chandar says she? The sleeping man hushes him. Pammi asks if he is studying or loving. Chandar says he is trying to love but this book is like an annoyed girl. If one can't get a thing, why love that. Chandar says if you don't get a thing, it should be kept aside. Pammi sits up easing herself, Chandar notices Thakkur and Bisarya staring them. Pammi says a few books are loveable that one wants to open them again and again, some are essential and need to be opened again and again. She asks him for going to cinema. Chandar says people often don't like his answers. Pammi says if he will ask her, there is nothing she dislikes. Chandar says he is a bit too dry. Pammi asks how much dry. Chandar says a bit more. Pammi asks a bit as well and a more as well. Chandar asks what time is the show. Pammi says it is 6:30. Chandar says he would be able to come till 7:00 Pammi says it is till 7:30. Chandar says he has to study a lot. Pammi says one who sticks with books is called termite, now he must decide if he comes or not and leave.

Bisurya tells Thakkur he didn't do anything, Thakkur says he couldn't study anything.

Chandar was reading when Sudha comes to him at home. She asks wasn't it enough in library. She asks him for his hand, she had brought sweets for him in her dupatta pallu. He asks why she ruined her dupatta, she gets annoyed that it is her own dupatta and takes the sweets away. Chandar comes behind her, apologizes and takes the sweet. He sits on the swing, and tells Sudha Pammi came to library and taking him to film. He asks Sudha to go as well. Sudha says her tutor is coming, he must go himself but must come by dinner. Chandar says he will get late. Sudha says she has cooked herself today, it takes much hardwork. Chandar murmurs that he must struggle to eat it as well.

Chandar and Pammi come to the show and fine a place for themselves to sit. Pammi lights a candle and says she is having such a beautiful night after a long time. Chandar looks at her. Pammi says this beautiful weather, this beautiful voice of song and this beautiful companion. Chandar says he has some problem with this environment. She asks why? He says that because of the beauty of its light many insects get burnt for no reason. Pammi asks if he is a coward. He says no, but she is really bold. She says she doesn't like wasting time. Chandar says each relation has a place in life, they are like sand of one holds really tight it slips. Pammi says she doesn't keep a relation, what he thinks about friendship. Chandar says he wants to know about her.

Sudha tells Papa she has cooked the meal tonight. Mr. Shukla asks why she isn't eating. Sudha says she will eat with Chandar. Mai tells Mr. Shukla Sudha has cooked each dish according to menu. Mai asks Sudha to have dinner, Sudha says she must wait for Chandar.

Pammi says her husband is in army, they married too early. Before she could understand the relation, she had started to hate that relation. She filed for a divorce but she heard about her husband's missing, a few people says he is no more. Pammi was crying, and asks Chandar what she should do. Chandar asks why she wanted to separate from her husband. She says each relation has its age, it ends with its age. Chandar says a relation has to end till the end of breathes. Pammi says that isn't a relationship, it is a dead body and she isn't interested in corpse. Chandar stands up and says she is really brave. She asks And? He says very delicate. She says how can he tell without touching someone, if she is delicate or not. Chandar says he thinks they must leave, Sudha is waiting for him. He had promised to be there and offers to drop her. She smiles, and asks why men are always in an urge to drop. Chandar says it isn't like that.

Sudha waited for Chandar at night.

Mai wakes Sudha up next morning. Chandar comes there. Mai goes to send tea for them. Chandar comes inside. Sudha asks what happened, why he is upset. Couldn't he sleep? Chandar says he was afraid of her scolding. She asks why he didn't come yesterday. Chandar says that because of that Pammi. Sudha asks why he is worried. He says Pammi is really different girl. He says she is bold. Sudha says she is also bold, she doesn't say but he is. He tells Sudha that Pammi asked him to touch with his eyes. Sudha makes fun. Chandar says she touched. Sudha asks how? Chandar says with her lips, Sudha is silent. She asks for his hand, she reads a poetry and says it is all gone. Now he must get worriless, active. In the morning, Mr. Shukla comes to library and asks registrar that he was looking for him in his office. Registrar says that he spends more time in library and tells him a new book. Mr. Shukla says that he has come for a job. Registrar says that he has grown really old and can't get the job. Mr. Shukla says he is serious and is strong enough to do the job. He says that a good person is in his mind for the job; Registrar asks who. Chandar comes there and asks Mr. Shukla, he? Mr. Shukla asks if he can't come here. Mr Shukla says it isn't only about book but also about a matter that needed to be solved. Registrar tells him that Mr. Shukla has suggested his name for Researcher's post. Chandar says that he had never asked for any favours in life, why he suggested his name then. Registrar says that Mr. Shukla just wants that a non deserving person doesn't get the post.

Chandar comes home, Bisurya watches him and is worried. He says he didn't do anything. Chandar says he must also not do anything. Bisurya asks Chandar to go home. Chandar comes inside, Sudha was annoyed. Chandar asks won't she talk to him. Sudha says she couldn't go to Geesu's brother's birthday party because of him. Chandar asks why she didn't go. Sudha says he wasn't home. Chandar says she could have gone by rickshaw. Sudha says Papa was also not there, they would have scolded her. Chandar asks why she didn't tell him about it. Mai tells Chandar that Sudha has fever. Chandar gets worried and says she will have to take medicine and get to sleep. He has a surprise for her tomorrow. She asks what, he says she will know about it tomorrow.

The next morning, Chandar and Sudha sat in a boat together. Sudha was still angry. He asks if she is still angry. She asks why he brought her here this morning. Chandar says, to feed the birds. Sudha says birds are also there on her roof. Chandar says these birds are different, they come here for a season. This is nature, everyone has to leave. Sudha says she won't leave, Chandar smiles that she will go, with her groom one day. She asks if he has brought the feed, and where are birds. The watch a flock of birds, Sudha stands cheering. Chandar calls the flock to themselves. They enjoy feeding them and their flight. Sudha looks at Chandar for a while and says he is really good. Chandar comes to Mr. Shukla if he called. Mr. Shukla says he has completed a writeup, he must take it to Pammi who will type it. He asks Chandar about his comments on a wedding. Chandar says it is good the wedding continues but our society doesn't normally let us do it. Mr. Shukla asks if it is about society or the two people who want to live together. Chandar asks why he is asking this from him. Mr. Shukla says he was just trying to search his mind about the wedding. Mr. Shukla says that one must think well before getting married, anything done in urge isn't good.

Chandar comes to Pammi's house, he knocks at the door. She asks who is there, Chandar comes in. Pammi is happy to see him, she comes to hold his hands. He get rids of his hands, she says no one comes here. Chandar asks where is Bodi is. She says he must be here somewhere, upset. Today, his rose thief also didn't come. She tells him she daily steals his rose. He asks why? Pammi says so that he thinks his wife steals his rose, and he doesn't get to know she has died. Bodi comes crying that someone took his rose, Pammi blames his wife saying she will break his leg. He says no, she will get hurt. Pammi asks what she must do to her then? He says she was really afraid of getting fat, this time she must tell her that she got fat. She will get upset. Pammi gets upset as Bodi goes out. Chandar asks where his wife is. Pammi says she ran away. Is he shocked, and must be thinking what would Bodi have thought. Pammi says she hates this love and marriage, it diables a person. She tells him that her brother loves his wife so much, she didn't tell him she is no more. Her brother got mad after her, his wife loved roses so he planted a lot of flowers thinking she is still here. She wipes her tears and asks if she should do the work he has come here for. Chandar asks how she got to know about it. Pammi says she wouldn't have come without any reason.

Chandar comes home, Pammi was there. Chandar asks Pammi how she came here. Mr. Shukla and Sudha say that there was a big accident and no one even told him. Mr. Shukla says there was such a big problem, she alone has been courageous and he must also be with her. Chandar asks where? Pammi tells him that in Kashmir people need them a lot. Army and Red Cross are also there, but people still need help. Mr. Shukla says that it is time for him to serve his country, he must go. Kashmir was all covered in snow. Chandar and Pammi drove in a jeep, Pammi stood in the car and smoked, then smiles looking at Chandar. Chandar takes her cigarette and throws it out. Rescue work was going on. In the camp, the army officer briefed them that many people are stuck in heavy snow, they need refuge. They ask for nursing staff for which Pammi volunteers. Chandar also promises to be with them.

Pammi comes to Chandar who stood lost. Pammi asks why is he so sad. Chandar says these people has such sadness in life, why they only remember their own happiness watching someone else's loss. Pammi says that sometimes people remember their hidden injuries. Who will fill in their soul injuries. Chandar says time will. Pammi says sometimes even time can't fill in those injuries, people just get used to living with them.

At home, Sudha played radio. She put a cap on Mai's hand so that her hair don't get to the food. She makes her wear apron and wear gloves. Mai asks her to cook now. Pammi instructs Mai from listening to the recipe from radio. She lets Mai boil vegetables. Mai says her papa won't eat this. Mai asks if she doesn't have to go class. Sudha says she is strange, always complains that Sudha doesn't come to kitchen and now she wants her to take class. A news update about destruction in Kashmir plays. Sudha gets worried.

In Kashmir, the camp administrator tells Pammi about her room number. Pammi says to the administrator that Chandar Kapoor is with her, they need a nearby tent.

Sudha brings tea for Mr. Shukla. She says to Papa that she has brought out some clothes to send to Kashmir. Sudha asks if she can take all the luggage, her trip from college is going there. Mr. Shukla agrees, Sudha cheers.

Pammi and Chandar sat with bon fire, Pammi says today she feels all her procrastinations have worked. Chandar says she has helped people so much, that is why. Pammi asks Chandar to read a poem as he is a poet. Chandar asks if she doesn't like his silence. Pammi says she has really been silent in life for a long time. Chandar says when two people even sit together, their silence talks. She asks Chandar to walk, he doesn't agree. She asks him to drop her till tent, and gives hand. He takes it after a while. They walk along the tents. Chandar says it is his tent, Pammi says hers is also here. In the tent, Pammi felt cold as she read some file. Chandar comes inside to call her for dinner, she was having fever. Chandar notices her tent was torn and says he will sleep here, she must take his tent. Pammi asks if he has some problem sleeping with her, she can wake up for the whole night. They come to Pammi's tent, the administrator comes inside. He tells Chandar that he already told Pammi that the tent is torn but she insisted to exchange her tent with Chandar's. He requests Chandar to sleep with him in his tent so that a lady can be adjusted with Pammi in this one. Chandar goes with administrator. Pammi sits in the tent alone.

At home, Mai brings sweet and juice to Bisurya. Sudha comes and tells him to leave soon. She is going to Kashmir. Bisurya reads a Persian saying of Shahjahan, that if there is heaven in earth it is here, here and only here. Sudha says a trip is going there, if he wants to donate something. Bisurya says neither he has money nor dress, but he can sent a rose flower with her. Sudha smiles and takes it.

The next morning, Chandar comes looking for Pammi who was smoking. He asks what she is doing here alone. She asks why. He says he was worried for her, she asks then? He says he started to find her. She shows him a mountain and asks what is there. He says border. She asks if he doesn't want to touch that border. He says he always like staying in limits. She says she always loves crossing borders. Pammi says they are so different, why are they friends. Chandar says she must have thought about it. Pammi asks if he thinks there is some special reason. Chandar says he doesn't think so, it could be anyone else as well. Pammi says she thinks if it wasn't him, it would be no one. She says that everything that happens is for a reason, if they have meet, there must be some plan of life behind it. Chandar says he doesn't accept it, he makes his own plans. There is a bomb blast near them, both roll down the snow.

There is a blast near Chandar and Pammi, both roll on the snow. Chandar takes hold of himself and asks Pammi if she is fine. Pammi says she had said there is a reason for them being together. Had she not been with him, she might not have been in this world. Chandar looks at her.

Pammi was dressed in red, she hugs Chandar who was on a boat, singing a song.

They were actually walking in snow, playing with it. They come to a church, lights the candle and pray. Pammi looks at Chandar, he looks at Pammi. Pammi sang for Chandar.

There was heavy snow, Pammi stood lost when chandar comes to her. Pammi says it is so cold. Chandar says may be the heart of sky is melting. Pammi plays with the cap of Chandar covered with snow. Chandar says if they stay out for a little more time, they will turn to ice. Both laugh.

In the tent, Pammi was changing when Chandar enters. He apologizes and turns around, Pammi allows him to turn. He says sorry, he didn't knock. She says she liked the right with which he came into her tent. He tells her to sit, she says that sometimes our soul goes further than us, he must not stop it. She holds his hand, he asks if she likes moonlight, let's go outside. Pammi stops him, lays her back on his shoulder and says when one has good company why go out. Chandar says no one could ever know about the heart of women, even poems have been written on them. Chandar straightens up, stands and says poems are to keep one awake when she requests him a poem. There are lullabies to let one sleep. Pammi says the more she comes to get closer, he goes away. She asks why he goes away from her. On the door of tent stood Sudha who says if she can come in. Chandar is shocked to see her. Sudha says she has come with her college trip, she appreciates the wide tent. Pammi goes outside. Chandar calls her but Sudha indulges him saying there is so cold. The next day, Sudha distributes tea, warm clothes among people and administration. Chandar is happy seeing her serve. Pammi also looks at Sudha taking love from people. Pammi is involved in nursing. Sudha comes to Chandar with tea. He says he much needed it. Sudha asks for Pammi and goes to give her tea. Pammi was smoking outside her tent, Sudha calls her and says she brought tea for her. She looks at the mountains and say the view is beautiful. Sudha held a rose, Pammi asks who gave it, its beautiful. Sudha gives it to Pammi. Pammi says if she was in her place, she wouldn't give it to her or anyone. Sudha says won't she remember her looking at the flower? Pammi says when one loves something or someone, one wants to get it. Sudha asks if Pammi can take this loveable snow from here? Pammi says she can't. Sudha says this snow will melt, evaporate and come to you as rain. When one loves someone, one has to achieve one's love in different forms. Pammi says to Sudha that she will suffer much sadness in life with this attitude. They travel back.

Sudha distributes sweets among the Pandits for Chandar's birthday. She tells them that there is no one to take care and distribute sweet for Chandar. She says he is such an angry man that she can't tell. The Pandit asks who is Chandar. She says that Chandar who comes here every day, the tall handsome man. One of them recognizes him as son of Nathu Halwai. She gets it why Chandar hates sweets and sweetness. Chandar speaks from behind, Sudha is alert and tells Chander they had been speaking about him, that he does his PhD soon, gets a good job and marries as well. She takes Chandar aside. Chandar asks Sudha if she was telling something about him to them, she says he is scolding her on his birthday. He asks when did he scold. She tells him to shut his eyes and keeps a handkerchief in pocket. He is happy to see it and asks if she can do embroidery? He asks what can she create. She says she learned to write Chandar through embroidery, that is enough for her. She moves on, he keeps on looking at her. She calls him for boating. Chandar comes down, Sudha calls the boat. They both ride into it.

At home, Pammi was with Mr.Shukla. Pammi says Chandar didn't come to give her the papers so she thought about coming herself. Mr. Shukla says he also met Chandar less since he returned from Kashmir. She asks about Sudha, Mr. Shukla says that it is Chandar's birthday today so she has gone to Mandir.

Chandar and Sudha returns, Sudha is happy to see Pammi. She asks how she came. Pammi says that Chandar don't come now, so she had to come. Sudha asks her to come in to have tea together. Pammi says that they both must come to her place for tea. Chandar says it is a bit difficult for him to come. Pammi says it is his birthday so she has kept a small party for celebration. Sudha says she will come for sure.

In the evening, Sudha and Chandar arrive. Pammi hugs Chandar and introduces people to him. Pammi's brother takes Chandar out. Pammi speaks to Sudha, Sudha says that Pammi looks beautiful. Pammi says it is because of love, that makes one beautiful. Pammi says she also looks beautiful. She asks Sudha if she loves Chandar, and wants to marry him. Sudha asks what kind of question is this, she and Chandar are above this all. Pammi says they always stay together, go out together, if she doesn't want to get Chandar why she doesn't free him. Sudha asks is only getting someone is love. Pammi says losing is also love, but she has nothing to lose. She doesn't have parents, she has seen her brother and army took her husband as well. Sudha has the love of family and Chandar's care. Her truth is that she loves Chandar dearly. Sudha is restless and goes out. Chandar meets her at the door and asks what happened. Sudha looks at Pammi and runs out. Chandar comes behind her and stops her asking where she is going. Sudha says she is uncomfortable. Chandar asks ifs Pammi said something. Sudha denies. Chandar asks what she said. Sudha says that Pammi loves him, she asked her if she loves Chandar. Pammi says what could she answer, is love felt at heart or soul. She says she had asked him a long time ago what is love, he didn't reply. She also doesn't have a reply, she asks Chandar to say something but he was speechless too. Sudha leaves.

Chandar comes in. Pammi stood by a window side. Chandar asks Pammi what she got making an innocent girl cry. Pammi says she didn't intend to. Chandar says that she has bear a lot of pains, they have made her ruthless. Pammi says that one day Sudha will have to face those truths. Pammi asks if he thinks he can only make Sudha happy or sad. He is doing unjust with Sudha. Not her, but Chandar is her sinner. Chandar says whoever he is, he is of Sudha not hers. Pammi says Sudha has no greed in her soul, she is like a Goddess. But he isn't a God, he got angry and could hold a hand at her for Sudha. He gets emotional and does he know why, because he understands that he doesn't tell anyone he loves Sudha but his body knows it. When we are happy, we dance with this body, we cry with the eyes, we purify our body by bathing before Pooja. We do everything with this body. He knows everything, had he not known he couldn't have saved himself from her. Chandar says she won't meet Sudha ever again, she must promise. Pammi says she won't, but he must know he is her sinner. Chandar says for him thinking like this is also sin. Pammi laughs and says if this is a sin, he has committed it. In fact, he is the God of sinners then. Chandar looks at Pammi then leaves the party. Pammi is left laughing.

Sudha comes in her room crying. Someone keeps a hand on her shoulder, it was her younger sister who asks Sudha what happened? Sudha asks when she came? She says she and amma just came here. Sudha says someone asked her questions? Her sister asks if she didn't know the answers, if she doesn't want to know them. She asks Sudha to hug her as they are meeting each other after eight years. Chandar walks towards Sudha's room, her sister was inside and it was dark. Chandar holds her with shoulders, then is shocked to see her and asks about Sudha. A lady comes inside and curses Chandar to be shameless. She asks who is he. Chandar asks who is she. She says she is Sudha's aunt (Bua). Bua scolds Chandar and drags him downstairs. Mr. Shukla says this is Chandar and takes him inside.

The next morning, in the library Sudha comes to Chandar's table and throws a paper on him but hides herself. Chandar looks around, then indulges in study. Sudha rolls another paper and throws it on his head. He gets up again. Sudha throws another paper, this time Chandar crawls behind her and sits there. Sudha looks at him and asks what he is doing. Chandar asks what she is doing. She says she is also a member here. Chandar says he has exams. Sudha says she also has, Chandar asks when? Sudha says they will come sometime. He asks if she came to tease him. Sudha says she has come to study as well. She tells Chandar to sit calmly. Chandar says till she doesn't go away he won't to study. Sudha asks him to promise that he will return straight home after library. He hasn't come home since last two days, he is her friend and upon a little thing he is so angry that he didn't ask how Sudha is, if she has eaten something or not. She says he has teased her so much. Chandar asks how he teased her? She cries and says he doesn't care how much he was worried if he is fine or not. He still has made her cry. She leaves saying if he won't come home today, he will find her dead face. At home, Mr. Shukla feels disgusting watching an old man eating sweets with both hands. Chandar comes home, Mr. Shukla introduces him to the father in law to be of Binti.

Sudha comes to Binti, Binti was upset and says that she doesn't want to get married. Sudha asks her to do some makeup, Binti says it is her heart that won't get better by putting in colours, what will it do. Sudha says she will get married. Chandar comes to call Binti downstairs. Sudha says she won't let her go like this. She will have to laugh. She and Chandar tickle Binti, she laughs finally. Bua calls Binti downstairs, she goes down again being upset. In the corridor, Bua scolds Binti that she is in her room since morning. She curses Binti that she ate her father after birth and has now made her life as hell. Sudha goes to talk about it to papa. Chandar says she isn't that bad at heart. Bua says to Chandar that she notices and watches what he does. Chandar gets upset at it. Sudha says to Chandar that he minded it when he himself was making her understand it. Sudha goes to speak to her papa, Chandar says that he has told him to leave. Sudha goes to Mr. Shukla and asks if he asked Chandar to leave. Mr. Shukla says yes he did. Sudha says he can't send Chandar out like this. Mr. Shukla says he isn't sending Chandar out but taking him to Bareli. Sudha is annoyed that Chandar always annoys her. She asks what he will bring for her. Sudha says he will bring a groom. Sudha says he must be a fat one, so will put a pickle of him. she asks if he is still feeling bad about Bua. Chandar says he feels bad for Binti. Bua scolds her badly, she hasn't been happy till yet and watching her inlaws, he isn't much hopeful. Sudha asks why marry? Chandar says only because that guy is Brahman. He himself doesn't accept it but there is society. He tells Sudha to take care and leaves. Sudha smiles.

They travelled in train. In the corridor, Chandar says to Mr. Shukla that he was much open in seminar today. Some people might disagree. Mr. Shukla says it isn't necessary everyone agrees with you. Some young men come with playcards and shout against Mr. Shukla. A young man stops them, he says that Mr. Shukla is their guest. The students say that he has seen some things in the seminar that are false, Kailash says that he really dislikes the way they are disrespecting an older man.

Kailash gives Mr. Shukla and Chandar a cup of tea and says they will get peaceful in a few minutes. Mr. Shukla says he has saved him today and asks what his name is. He says it is Kailash. Mr. Shukla asks what his cast is. He says it is Brahman. Mr. Shukla asks who is at home. He says his father and mother. Mr. Shukla introduces him to Chandar who is doing PhD and is like his family member. Mr. Shukla says that he wants to meet his parents, Kailash says sure, he has no objection.

They return. Chandar comes to Sudha who was in ground. He says he has come here for the first time after returning from Bareli and she is so uninterested. Sudha says he hasn't even come here straight, he comes here only to have tea. Chandar asks her for a cup of tea, Sudha calls Binti to bring a cup of tea. Chandar says she has got an assistant. Chandar asks Sudha to write a letter to Kailash, Sudha asks is he the one who saved his life. Chandar corrects that he saved Sir's life. Sudha tells him to write from her as well that she wants to meet him. She says she was thinking about joining the party in a year or so. Chandar gets a cough. He asks if she knows what joining party means, one has to work there. And what if she will tell her papa that in a party one gets tea and biscuits and she got a lecture. They laugh, Binti had brought the tea and also laughs. Bua comes there, she scolds Binti for laughing so loud. Chandar asks if he must light a candle in the temple and asks to take Binti along her as well. Bua gi agrees, and takes Binti to get ready. On the boat, Binti and Sudha feels excited. Binti says this place is so beautiful. Sudha tells her to shut her eyes. They call Ao, Ao.. (Come.. come). All the birds gather around their boat. Chandar throws their feed to them. Binti wishes this remains the same.

At night, Pandits were praying. Chandar comes with Mr. Shukla and Sudha. They pray there. Sudha goes downstairs and takes a seat in prayer. Mr. Shukla and Chandar sit upstairs. Mr. Shukla says to Chandar that Sudha has grown up now. He asks Chandar that if he has to choose a boy for Sudha how he should be. Chandar was speechless. He says to Mr. Shukla that he knows better. Mr. Shukla says that he wants to know his opinion as he knows Sudha really well. Chandar says that for Sudha, the guy must be educated, good natured, and respectful of elders and never keeps Sudha in pain. Mr. Shukla says that he must also be Brahman. Chandar at once remembers a talk with Mr. Shukla. He had said that one can't separate milk from tea. He says one can try. He says that there are a few things less in people that can't be separated from them. This is his belief. Mr. Shukla says that he has seen such a guy. He shows him the photo of Kailash and says he thinks that he will keep Sudha happy. He has even talked to Kailash's family, he likes Sudha. Now Chandar must speak to Sudha about it. Chandar stands with Mr. Shukla who leaves, Chandar stands there with the photo.

Chandar keeps the photo in his pocket as the pooja was ending. Sudha turns to call Chandar downstairs where they light candles. They go upstairs hand in hand with each other. Chandar thinks about Mr. Shukla's opinion about Kailash. He remembers one of his teacher had told him not to forget about the ones who owed them with something, never forget to respect others and give love, in the end success will be his. He looks at Kailash's photo, sitting on his easy chair. He tears Sudha's photo in his book and press it in his fist.

Sudha was enjoying with her friends, dancing in her room. Chandar comes home and hears the girls singing. He arrive at Sudha's room and calls her out. Sudha comes out, she sends Chandar away and says she will come to him a bit late. Chandar waits for her on the swing downstairs. Binti comes to him as he was watching Kailash's photo. She asks what happened? And asks is this Kailash with whom Sudha's proposal has been done. So, her uncle has given him this responsibility to tell Sudha. She asks Chandar to look at her. Chandar asks what is she seeing. She says she is seeing if Devtas ever blink. She leaves.

Mr. Shukla calls Sudha, Sudha brings tea downstairs. Chandar stops her and asks her to sit. She shows her the photo of Sudha, that this is Kailash. Sudha says he is good looking, and handsome. Chandar asks if she likes him. Sudha says yes, and heads to leave. Chandar stops her, Sudha says if he needs something he must ask Binti. Chandar asks her to sit down and takes her hand in his. He asks her to agree upon something he is going to say. Sudha asks what is that she doesn't hear when he says. Chandar says that he wants her to promise she won't deny. Chandar places his eyes on Sudha's hand and asks her to marry that guy. Sudha jerks his hand away and goes backward, away from Chandar. She cries and says she doesn't like such jokes. Is this why he had been speaking to her with such love. Chandar says that she has promised him. Sudha says she didn't promise, and what promise does he fulfil; is it right to get his promise fulfilled. She cries and pleads him not to sacrifice her tying her in a promise. Chandar comes to her, keeps a hand on her shoulder. She jerks his hand away and runs inside the room. Chandar comes to her again, she again jerks him away and says she will never marry. They want to kill her, she herself will beat herself to death and hits her head on mirror. Sudha asks if he was the only one to make her choose her proposal, she doesn't need him anymore. She asks him if he felt ashamed asking the questions that he did. She cries, takes the photo from Chandar's hand and says that she will tell Papa that she likes this guy, he is good but she will never marry him. Chandar stops Sudha, she wrestles with him. He slaps her, she fell on the floor. Both cry in agony.

Sudha gets up to hold Chandar's hand, she asks if he is hurt? She keeps her face on his hand, he looks at her. She says if he will take enmity with her Chandar? Chandar says he wonders what she must be thinking about him, he understands her well. Her heart has told him what it couldn't tell her, have they come into each other's life to make each other weak. Sudha holds Chandar's hand, his tears fell off his eyes. Sudha says she knows that she isn't Geesu who dreams of getting married. She knows that she is so pure for him, she doesn't want to marry anyone. She tells him not to get upset. She will do what he would ask her in life. Both cry. Chandar asks Sudha if he should tell Mr. Shukla that she has agreed for this proposal, Sudha fell back to sit. Chandar leaves the room heavily. Binti was watching this. Chandar loses control and fell on floor in the hall, he stands up, rubs his head and moves forward. Binti watches.

Sudha cries in her room.

Chandar was sitting on the swing, Sudha was going upstairs from behind when she stops behind him. He looks at her, she smiles weakly and asks when he came. She tells him that tomorrow Kailash's family is coming, her to be mother in law and sister in law to be. She asks if Chandar feels good he must bring her powder and perfume, may be they like her this way. Sudha was about to touch Chandar's shoulder, he stops her saying the black colour will get on it. Sudha looks at her hand, then says his soul can never be made dirty. She asks him to massage her head, she really want it to. Chandar asks her to sit on the swing. CHandar says that she hasn't yet lost her childhood, she shouldn't have done this with her Papa. Sudha says it is gone. Chandar asks when? Sudha says yesterday afternoon. Tear fell off Sudha's eyes.

Chandar drove his bicycle when he sees Sudha standing in the way. He calls her name but she was lost. He asks what is she doing here. Sudha says her shoe broke when she was going to college, she is getting it mended at cobbler. Chandar says she could have asked him, last time she came to university. The cobbler gives them the shoe, Chandar says may be there is a problem with her shoe. Sudha says may be she doesn't know how to walk. Chandar asks her to drop her to the college, Sudha says he has go to university, their ways are different. Chandar says they can go together for some time, Chandar drives his cycle along with Sudha's Tonga until they get apart. Sudha watches Chandar going on his way. Binti tells Chandar that Sudha isn't eating anything. He comes to Sudha and asks why isn't she eating anything. Sudha says she has no appetite. Chandar shows her the card design of her wedding, he tells her to come there for sure. The guy is good looking, she will like meeting him. Sudha says she will try to come, now if her husband will allow she will come for sure. Chandar smiles, he says he will get her husband for sure.

At home, there are wedding preparations. The ladies danced at the beat of drum. Chandar watches Binti dancing, she stops at once as she notices him looking towards her. Chandar gets medicine for Sudha so that she gets worried soon. Sudha didn't hear. Chandar says that the whole house is preparing for wedding, and she is so silent. What if someone asks why is she silent. He says if she remains like this, he will also fall ill. Sudha sits up in her bed and takes the medicine. Chandar comes to Mr. Shukla, he asks if Sudha took medicine. Mr. Shukla tells Chandar to get some furniture for the new house of Sudha and Kailash. Chandar says that Kailash is the member of socialists party, he won't accept it. Mr. Shukla says that we must give something to them as gift. Chandar says we are giving them the most precious gift of this house, it will cost us a lot. Mr. Shukla says that he is right. How will they live in this house once Sudha is gone. There was lighting decorations on the house, the wedding was taking place. Mr. Shukla sends Binti to bring Sudha. Binti says to Chandar that it is time for wedding, Sudha will only come if he says to her. Chandar says this obedience of hers has become a punishment for him, may be there was one thing that Sudha wouldn't have agreed to.

Sudha stood watching moonlight, Chandar comes to terrace. Binti also hears the talk. Sudha asks Chandar to look at it, she will also watch it. This way they will be able to see each other. Chandar looks at Sudha for a while, then tells her that everyone is waiting for her downstairs. He asks if she won't listen to him, she asks what is that she didn't listen of him. But she has a condition. Binti was standing at the door. She goes there, and says that Chandar must be there in the time of vows, if he won't be there she will not be able to do this. Chandar says what is she saying. Binti asks Chandar to say yes. Chandar says he has a lot to do. Sudha says today they only have one important task, they have to cross each other's heart. She leaves downstairs.

Chandar and Binti bring Sudha downstairs. Mr. Shukla hugs her and makes her sit on the stage. The wedding rituals take place. Kailash takes his wedding vows. Sudha accepts them. Chandar walked away from the hall with each vow.

Sudha accepts the vows of marriage and the rituals continue. Chandar walks away from the hall. They take wedding rounds. Kailash smiled, Sudha cried. Sudha comes at the terrace of the house where Chandar was asleep. She sits beside his bed and cries, he wakes up at once. He holds at once, he says that she is a great lady, she is much more than what he has thought her of. Sudha puts some flowers in the feet of Chandar bound in her dupatta. He asks what she is doing. She then puts red colour on his feet. She says that she will no longer listen to anything he will say. She keeps her head on his knee and cries. Chandar was silent. She takes the flowers from his foot, wrap in again, crying she will take them with her. She stands to leave, Chandar stops her and asks if she is really going. Crying, she says she is leaving the house, not his heart. He holds her hand and says he doesn't know how, but please don't go. Sudha says she will have to leave, she tells him to take care of himself and her papa. She asks him to leave her hand, he has no right to hold it now. The farewell bidding rituals take place. Sudha leaves thinking that she prays this house never gets unpeaceful as it has kept her like a princess. She has played her in this house, spent her childhood. Her memories are associated with this house. Mr. Shukla stood outside the door, and blesses Sudha to stay happy. Sudha asks him to forgive her if she ever did a mistake, and take care of himself. Sudha tells Chandar to take care of Papa's medicines, and drink only milk tea. It isn't that he stops taking care of himself if Sudha has gone. She tells Binti to take care of Chandar, hugs Mai and both cry loud. Kailash keeps a hand on Sudha's shoulder and takes her along into the car. Chandar shuts the car door. Chandar and Sudha couldn't take off their eyes on each other until the car had moved on. Chandar turns to face Binti who was staring at him too. She then goes inside along with everyone leaving Chandar alone.

On the river bank, Chandar sat alone on the stairs. He looks at a girl standing on the boat, the vision clears to be Sudha. He calls Sudha but it was Binti. She corrects that it is her, Chandar asks what she is doing so early here. Binti says she came to pray for something. Chandar asks what she had to pray. Binti asks what he was looking for and why he called her Sudha, was he looking for her. Chandar says Sudha has gone, it seems everything has gone with her. Binti says that he let her go, she says that he must have taken Sudha from Kailash, he let Sudha go instead. Her uncle also did so. Chandar says it was good for Sudha. Binti says that for Sudha, he has always taken the decisions and they were even right. But this time he was mistaken. She says that she is afraid this time and Chandar must also be afraid of this. Binti leaves.

Chandar arrive at the library and indulges himself in the daily routine. He comes to cobbler one day in winter, he asks to repair his shoe. He was lost, recalls Sudha instructing the cobbler. He tells him to do it right, and instructs just the way of Sudha. The cobbler says that he is just instructing like the madam. Chandar is silent, he pays the cobbler. The cobbler asks where madam is, he didn't see her for long. Chandar leaves without answering.

In the morning, Raamu brings Chandar tea. He remembers when Sudha brought him tea, he had commented that there is no tea, and this is only milk. Sudha had convinced him that milk is healthy. Chandar held the cup and took a sip, Sudha tasted it and asked what had happened to it. Chandar had said that this is what she wanted him to take. Chandar remembers that Sudha had asked him to take milk tea only. He woke up from a night mare, Binti stood there. Chandar mistakes her with Sudha, Binti says it is her and she wants to tell him Sudha is coming home. Chandar is excited The next morning, Chandar arrives at Sudha's place. At the doorstep, he is happy to see Sudha. He calls Sudha, Sudha who was upstairs runs down to him. Both exchanges cheerful smiles, Sudha was about to take step to Chandar when Kailash calls her from upstairs. Sudha stops at once. Binti was noticing, she tells Sudha that Kailash is calling her. Sudha goes back. Binti comes to Chandar and asks what she wants, Chandar smiles and says she has got really sensible. Sudha comes to the room, Kailash asks where her Kurta is. Sudha says she will just get it, Kailash gets flirtatious with her. He says he loves Sudha, Sudha avoids him.

Mr. Shukla asks Chandar why he came after a long time. Chandar says that he wasn't feeling really well. Mr. Shukla says that he is also not well, it is said that after the wedding of a daughter father's burden reduces but here he doesn't feel so. Sudha comes there. She says that she had asked Chandar to take care of Papa, but what she should say him now. Mr. Shukla says that now she has scolded him, now from today everything will go well. She says that she came to say that she is going to temple, Papa allows. Sudha asks Chandar if he will come. Chandar says he will also go. Kailash comes there and tells Sudha to leave Chandar with him. Chandar asks Sudha to go with Binti.

Sudha and Binti sit at the river. Sudha sings. Binti continues with the song; Sudha cries. Both cry. Binti asks why she had gone. Sudha asks if she really think she had left. Binti tells her not to make up. She tells Sudha that the house has gone empty after she has left. Sudha tells her to take care of Chandar, when she looks at Chandar she thinks this is some other Chandar. He has changed so much, she wants her Chandar, like he was when she was there. Sudha tells Binti to become Sudha. Binti says she can never be Sudha.

Kailash and Chandar have tea together. Kailash says to Chandar that he has handed him a wrong girl. He is a bullet and she is so dry. Chandar says to Kailash that his mates has brought revolution. Kailash says that their blood is warm. Chandar says that he writes poems. Kailash laughs saying he wants to party and Chandar wants to write. He says that there is something more strong than everything, that is marriage. He tells Chandar that he wanted to do so much for this country, but after getting married he got so peaceful.

Next day, Chandar comes home. Binti asks him to come inside, he will get meal. She goes inside and asks Sudha to take meal for Chandar. Sudha asks Binti to take it, as she now will have to take care of him. Binti sends Sudha. Sudha comes to Chandar with the plate and smiles. Chandar was upset. Sudha was happy being with him, she asks Chandar why is he annoyed with the food. She makes a bite, Chandar refuses. He tells her to go, he will eat by himself as this doesn't suit a married lady. Tears fell off Sudha's eyes, she asks why is he punishing her, why he talks to her like a stranger. Chandar says this is of no use, and he doesn't want this all. This all doesn't suit her as a married lady. Sudha says that he had compelled her to marry and leave, she throws her bangles and jewellery away saying which married woman. Chandar is shocked. She asks if he wanted this. He comes and makes Sudha sit, he puts her jewelry on again. Sudha cries. She says that she doesn't care about anyone, goes away from him and tells him to have food, for her please. Because if he won't eat, she won't be able to have it. And she doesn't only have to eat for herself, but for someone else as well. Sudha takes a leave from Mr. Shukla, she tells him to take his medicines in time and don't worry about him. Kailash tells Mr. Shukla not to worry about Sudha. Sudha tells Chandar to take care of himself, Chandar tells Kailash to keep coming here, it brings happiness in their house. Kailash tells Chandar that the next time, this happiness will be double because they will be three next time. Kailash hugs Chandar and leaves, Chandar is shocked.

Chandar asks Mr. Shukla where they are leaving, Mr. Shukla says he is going to bid his other daughter as well. Chandar wishes Binti that may she lives peacefully at her husband's house.

Chandar remains lost. He arrives at Sudha's house, sits on the sofa and relaxes. He calls Mai, then asks Sudha to tell Mai bring him water. He was asleep. He speaks in sleep that Sudha if she knows he only drinks tea from her hand. He shouts and calls anyone at home. The voices of Sudha and Mr. Shukla echo in his mind. Chandar shouts, going crazy. He fells on the floor in agony. Pammi ji comes and hugs him. She spends time with Chandar, he indulges in drinking, smoking and relation with Pammi.

Chandar gets up coughing in the morning. Someone mixes tea for him, he sits up, smiles and asks Sudha? Binti says it is her. She asks if he is still sleeping, there Mr. Shukla daily goes to look for him. She watches the bottle of alcohol and says why would he go to river now. Chandar asks wasn't she going to marry. Binti says it has broken, Mr. Shukla let him go. Chandar asks why is she so happy. Binti says some marriages must break, and some marriages must not take place. Mr. Shukla sat besides the river. A pandit asks if Chandar hasn't come, he even didn't see him for some time. Mr. Shukla says yes, he hasn't come. He stands to leave, and watches Chandar standing behind. Mr. Shukla comes down again besides the river. Chandar was about to touch his feet. Mr. Shukla holds his hands, he says that may be he has done a big mistake, a man becomes great because of his acts and not his cast. He apologizes the God as well and turns to leave. The next day, Bua was crying when Chandar arrive. She says to Chandar that this is the third time that her wedding broke. Raami kaka tells Chandar they were greedy people, the boy was also inter fail. Bua curses Binti whey she doesn't die at all. Binti stands up and tells her to stop it now, there has been enough, if she hates her face so much she must go to a temple and only pray there. She shouts at her that she will stay here at her mama's place, if she wants to leave she can. Mr. Shukla smiled victoriously.

Chandar asks Pammi what she is reading. Pamii says it is his diary. 3rd feb: 10 am Sudha's shoe repaired. 12 am take Sudha to singing class. 3 pm Sudha's appointment at doctor. 5 pm get Sudha's papers solved. Pammi smiles that this whole diary is filled with Sudha and still he claims he didn't love her. Chandar says only he didn't know, his diary even did. Binti says to Chandar that Sudha asked her to take care of him but she will only take care of him if he comes here. He never comes. Chandar asks if she had called him for scolding. Binti says there is a letter for him, of Sudha. Chandar is excited. Binti asks him to promise first that he will come here daily. Binti asks him to take promise on Sudha's name that he will come here daily and won't go at Pammi's house. Chandar asks how she knows he goes to Pammi's house. Binti says she understands him, he has touched the heights of love, he knows that if one falls from height it pains a lot. She can't see him fell. This time she is giving him the letter, but the next time she won't give Sudha's letter to his hands. She hands the letter to Chandar. Binti leaves.

Sudha had written, that this time she left him but she won't be able to do it the next time. How she should take care of herself, when she watches his face sometimes she only gets peace. She doesn't know where the storm of her life will take her. She has been spending her days in his memories, and asks him to hide behind her memories.

Sudha reads the reply, he is happy that she is happy. He is fine and happy. She must stop worrying for him as well. Sudha cried reading the letter. Kailash asks whose letter is this. Sudha says this is from his home. Kailash was polite, Sudha cried.

Mr. Shukla hears the call, he tells Binti to call Bua as Sudha is unwell, there was a call from her inlaws, they must go soon. He calls Chandar. Chandar wakes up restlessly.

Mr. Shukla brings Sudha weak, she was weak and was about to step up the stair when Chandar holds her hand. They look at each other for a while, Mr. Shukla asks Chandar to take Sudha inside. In the room, Binti wipes Sudha's sweat and asks how she feels. Sudha smiles and says now she is home, she is feeling better. Binti asks juice? Sudha asks for tea with her hand, Binti goes to bring it. While leaving, she asks Chandar if he would like it too. Chandar nods. Sudha asks Chandar to sit beside her. He comes to sit on the bed but steals his looks from Sudha, tear fell off Sudha's eyes. She asks what condition has he made of him. Sudha feels nauseatic, Chandar feels concerned. Chandar asks what she has done with herself, Sudha says now she is home, everything will be fine now. Chandar asks if she wants to go somewhere out. Sudha smiles that she was also thinking the same. Chandar asks where she would like to go, Sudha says to Pammi ji. Pammi ji makes tea for Sudha, she asks Chandar if he would like tea or coffee. Chandar says nothing. Pammi ji lights a cigarette for herself, she asks Sudha how she is. Sudha says good. Pammi says she liked hearing that someone is happy after marriage. Bunti comes inside excited that one rose has budded off. Pammi sends Chandar with him. Pammi asks Sudha what she wants to say. Sudha says Chandar is no more the way he was, he is falling and only she can save him. Pammi asks what she is saying. SUdha says she knows it all, and Pammi knows what Sudha doesn't. She joins her hand and asks Pammi to save Chandar, only she can save him. Pammi wipes her tears.

Sudha lights a candle, Pammi gets her a rose pressed in a book. She asks if she remembers this rose. They recall it was the one Sudha had given her in Kashmir. Pammi says she was right, this rose was always Sudha's. When it was with her it was fresh, but now it has dried up. She tells Sudha to keep it to herself, if it remains with her it might remain fresh. Sudha cries, Chandar comes and asks what happened. Pammi says Sudha isn't well, he must take her home. They exchange smiles, Pammi asks Chandar to take care of her and himself as well. They leave, Pammi lights a candle to calm herself, then calls Chandar back. She tells Chandar that she is going abroad for some time, she might get a bit late in returning. When she returns he must take care of himself. She says good bye to Chandar. Chandar leaves, speechless. Sudha and Chandar come back home. Chandar says to Sudha he had to tell her something. Sudha says Binti told her he is going out. She tells him to come soon, it must not get very late. Chandar insists that she must go inside, but Sudha makes him sit in the car. She feels unwell again and struggles to come inside. Near the swing, the pain gets unbearable, she calls Papa in agony and fell on the floor. Everyone runs outside. Mr. Shukla shouts her name from upstairs. Mr. Shukla shouts to call a doctor.

The doctor tells Mr. Shukla what he has done to Sudha. Sudha's condition has worsen, he must call Kapoor and Kailash. Kailash tells Sudha that Mr. Shukla called him because she was unwell. He is unaware that Kailash is not her treatment but ailment. Mr. Shukla stood on the door, lost when Kailash comes to him. He takes his blessings and tells Mr. Shukla it is important that he leaves, comrades needs him and Australia's conference is also important. Mr. Shukla says Sudha also needs him. Kailash says his presence of absence won't affect Sudha much. Mr. Shukla says he couldn't understand Sudha. Kailash says may be, but he just came to know Sudha but he knows her for years as he is her father, could he understand Sudha. Mr. Shukla was speechless. Kailash says Sudha is like a breeze, cold and peaceful. He is the storm, he doesn't has that peace that Sudha needed. He says he will try to come soon, touches Mr. Shukla's feet again and leaves. Mr. Shukla takes a seat.

Sudha called Sudha in sleep. The doctor observed her and takes Mr. Shukla out. Binti sits besides Sudha. The doctor says to Mr. Shukla that there are two more hours, if they pass he will return him his daughter.

Binti was sitting with Sudha. It was raining heavily. Sudha murmurs Chandar's name. Binti calls her. Sudha asks who is she. Binti tells her to recognize it is her. Sudha says how can she be Binti, Binti is with Chandar. She tells Binti to take care of Chandar in her absence. Sudha looks behind Binti and asks who is there, Binti says no one is there. She looks behind Binti and says she won't go, she doesn't have to go right now. Binti calls Mr. Shukla, Sudha doesn't recognize Mr. Shukla. Doctor also comes there. Sudha says that it is time, the bells have rung and she must leave. The doctor says to Mr. Shukla that Sudha likes rain a lot, they must take her out. Sudha still murmured Chandar's name. Out in the garden, SUdha asks Mr. Shukla if Chandar is coming. May be she would be able to see him. She tells Binti to make a garland of flowers for Chandar. Binti says she won't do any work for Sudha, she must do all her work by herself. She cries that Chandar doesn't listen to anyone except her. Sudha says now he will have to hear, she won't be able to speak. She again asks about Chandar. A car arrive at the home, Mr. Shukla tells Sudha that Chandar has arrived. Suhda gets still on the bench.

In the corridor, Mr. Shukla and Chandar were together. Chandar asks Mr. Shukla what happened. Mr. Shukla cries that she can no longer be saved.

Sudha sits up in bed and asks Binti if Chandar has come. Chandar stands at the door. She turns to look at Chandar, then asks when he returned from Australia, now what he wants. She tells him to see what he has done to her, he must leave else she will hit her head on the bed and die. Chandar heads to leave. Sudha sits up again and smiles at Chandar asking if he has come. Chandar comes to sit besides her and says he has arrived. He assures her that she will get well. She makes him sit on her bed and tells him to stay here. He hugs Sudha and says she has to live with them all. She calls Mr. Shukla who comes to hug her, she hugs him and cry saying she is in much pain. She asks him to let her rest on his lap. She cries and tells Mr. Shukla to ask Chandar marry Binti. Both Chandar and Binti are shocked. She requests Chandar himself, but couldn't bend. She tells Binti that she can't bend, she must touch Chandar's feet and touch them at her forehead. Binti does so. Sudha lay on the bed, Chandar moves behind crying. Mr. Shukla hugs him. Chandar hears Sudha crying in pain, they head towards her. Sudha straightens up again asking who is he, behind Chandar. She tells him to go, he must not take Chandar but her. Chandar says he is here, Sudha cried in pain. Chandar notices Sudha was still, Mr. Shukla cried her name.

Chandar stood with Sudha's Astiyan on the river. Binti was with him in the boat. Chandar was lost in Sudha's thoughts. Binti was thinking how Sudha had given her hand in Chandar's. Chandar thought how he had said to her once in the boat that those who comes have to go. He finally does the Astiya Visarjan. He remembers when Sudha had left him at the time of her wedding. Binti opens Chandar's fist to let go of the last dust left. Chandar fell on the boat seat, he and Binti cry together.

== Cast ==
- Rahil Azam as Chandar Kapoor
- Umang Jain as Sudha Shukla
- Shweta Salve as Pamela “Pammi” D’Cruz
- Rajendra Gupta as Dr. Shukla
- Winy Tripathi as Kailash Mishra
