= Dil Jaise Dhadke... Dhadakne Do =

- Genre: Drama
- Created by: Mahesh Bhatt
- Written by: Sanjay Masum
- Screenplay by: Mallika Dutt Gharde
- Story by: Laxmi Jay Kumar
- Directed by: Guroudev Bhalla Manmeet Singh Sodhi
- Creative director: Shweta Bishnoi
- Starring: Shruti Seth; Rahil Azam; Jared Savaille; Hirva Trivedi
- Music by: Puneet Dixit
- Country of origin: India
- Original language: Hindi
- No. of seasons: 1
- No. of episodes: 38

Production
- Producer: Guroudev Bhalla
- Cinematography: Ganesh Govind Sankala
- Editor: Santosh Kumar
- Camera setup: Multi-camera
- Running time: 21 minutes
- Production company: Guroudev Bhalla Productions

Original release
- Network: StarPlus
- Release: 10 February – 27 March 2020

Dil Jaise Dhadke... Dhadakne Do (The Way The Heart Beats... Let It Beat) is an Indian television series which premiered on 10 February 2020 on StarPlus. Created by Mahesh Bhatt and produced by Guroudev Bhalla, it starred Javed Savaille, Hirva Trivedi, Rahil Azam and Shruti Seth. It was indefinitely halted on 27 March 2020 owing COVID-19 outbreak after the shootings were stalled. However, in May 2020 it was reported to not return post-lockdown being cancelled mid-way by the channel due to low ratings.

== Plot ==
An innocent and mute 7 year old girl Iti has become speechless and numb after losing her mother in a fire accident one year ago. Yug is a charming young boy who crosses path with Iti. He tries to make her smile and speak again while they become best friends.

Shivraj is a renowned doctor, who has sacrificed the worldly pleasures and become renowned after a past accident, and is now known as Devguru, keenly searches for the Devi whom he considers would save the world from evil and sin. After a lot of efforts Devguru finds Devi in Iti, and wants to make her Devi. But his attempts are failed by who Yug, who has sworn to protect Iti and keep her happy.

== Cast ==
=== Main ===
- Hirva Trivedi as Iti Rai
- Jared Savaille as Yug Gautam
- Rahil Azam as Dr. Shivraj Singh / Devguru
- Shruti Seth as Bhavini Mishra: Devguru's assistant
- Archana Singh as Savita

=== Recurring ===
- Piyali Munshi as Sadhna Rai– Pankaj's wife; Iti's mother
- Sandeep Baswana as Pankaj Rai: Iti's father
- Himangi Kavi as Shanti Gautam: Diya and Yug's mother
- Nandini Maurya as Diya Gautam: Shanti's daughter, Yug's sister
- Himmanshoo A. Malhotra as Dr. Sanjay: Shivraj's best friend, Aparna's brother
- Achal Tankwal as Raju
- Tanishq Seth as Komal
- Payash Jain as Om Rai: Iti's cousin, Savita's son
- Sanket Choukse as Abeer: Bhavini's lover

== Production ==
=== Development ===
Initially titled Jannat, it was later renamed Dil Jaise Dhadke... Dhadakne Do.

The show is created by film maker Mahesh Bhatt. Talking about the show, he said, "Our show is basically questioning the narrative that is prevalent among men – to be treated separately. There is a man who believes that this child is a vehicle for the goddess to step into the world. On the other hand, the young compassionate boy says she is just my friend, and no Devi. This is the pitch where the battle takes place".

=== Cancellation ===
Owing Covid-19 outbreak, the shootings were stalled since 19 March 2020 and the series telecast was halted midway on 27 March 2020 and was to resume shoot after the lockdown ends. However, in May 2020 it was confirmed to not return, being axed by the channel as it had earlier garnered low ratings. Because of it Rajveer Singh and Ashi Singh who were supposed to enter the series as Yug and Iti after a leap in story planned on end of March 2020 was not possible.

== Reception ==
The series had a very low ratings with a television rating point (trp) between 0.6 and 0.8 in urban.
