= Resham Dankh =

Indian soap opera

- Country of origin: India
- Original language: Hindi

Production
- Producers: Jamnadas Majethia; Aatish Kapadia
- Running time: 25 minutes approx
- Production company: Hats Off Productions

Original release
- Network: STAR One
- Release: 15 August 2006 – December 2006

Resham Dankh is an Indian soap opera which premiered on 14 August 2006 on STAR One, starring Rahil Azam and Mouli Ganguly in the lead roles. The narrative was adapted from Aatish Kapadia's Gujarati novel of the same name. The series was produced by Hats Off Productions.

== Plot ==
The story begins with Aditya Balraj surrendering to the police and confessing to murder. Following his arrest, he decides to write his memoirs in his prison cell, and through these memoirs, we see the story of Aditya Balraj's family.

Aditya is a successful businessman, running a silk manufacturing industry. He is married to Divya. Despite all their happiness, they are unable to have a child even after many years of marriage.

Fortune takes a turn for them when Divya becomes pregnant in the eighth year of their marriage. However, the child is stillborn. As Aditya's brother is about to bury the lifeless child, the baby boy shows signs of life upon getting wet in the rain.

An astrologer then prophesies that the child will have a happy life until he turns five years old, which makes Aditya paranoid about the protection of his child.

The story then moves ahead by five years. Aditya's son, Dev Aditya Balraj has grown up to be a smart boy. Aditya dotes over him and has managed to successfully expand his business over the years. Dev is similarly adored by the full joint family. However, Dev is very eco-friendly and is horrified when he learns of how the silk manufacturing process involves the killing of silkworms.

Dev begins to resent his father. Unable to bear this, Aditya decides to shut down his business. This brings the ire of the family down upon Dev, as they were all dependent on Aditya. The Balrajs nearly go bankrupt and are forced to move into a chawl.

Meanwhile, Aditya continues to research and his team stumbles upon a new process of manufacturing silk, that does not involve the killing of silkworms. Branding it as Ahimsa Silk (English: 'non-violent), Aditya relaunches his business.

Aditya's competitors, some of whom were earlier his associates, suffer from heavy losses due to the widespread adoption of Ahimsa Silk. After finding out that Dev was responsible for this entire series of events, they murder the innocent child.

Aditya is devastated with the loss of his son, and vows to find his son's murderer and avenge him.

== Cast ==
- Rahil Azam as Aditya Balraj
- Mouli Ganguly as Divya, Aditya's wife
- Rajeev Mehta
- Apara Mehta
- Sumeet Raghavan as Shantanu Balraj; Aditya's elder brother
- Sulbha Deshpande as Janki Mausi
- Yash Bhadrani as Dev Balraj, Aditya's son
- Disha Vakani as Kinari
- Puneet Vaishist as Gaurav
- Dimple Shah
- Manava Naik
