= Gunahon Ka Devta (novel) =

Famous Hindi novel by Dharamvir Bharati

- Author: Dharamvir Bharati
- Genre: Fiction
- Publisher: Bhartiya Jnanpith
- Publication date: 1949
- Media type: Print (Paperback)
- Pages: 258
- Dewey Decimal: 891.433
- Followed by: Suraj ka Satwan Ghoda (1952)

Gunahon Ka Devta (Hindi: गुनाहों का देवता, lit. The God of Sins) is a 1949 Hindi novel by Dharamvir Bharati. The story is set in Allahabad (modern Prayagraj) during the British rule in India. The story has four main characters: Chandar, Sudha, Binti and Pammi.

Over time, the novel gained historical importance and a cult following. The story is about a young student, Chander, who falls in love with Sudha, the daughter of his college professor. Bhartiya Jnanpith Trust published it, and its 55th edition came out in 2009.

This is Dharamvir Bharati's most famous work; it earned him a considerable following among contemporary youth, won several awards and accolades, and established his reputation in Hindi Literature, second only to Munshi Premchand.

== Synopsis ==
The novel focuses on "non-expressive love and romance between two characters (Chandar and Sudha)", showing various trappings of love in urban middle-class, pre-independence India and the emotional conflicts of enthusiastic, ambitious and idealistic youth. In the novel's foreword, the author says:

"While writing this novel, I experienced the feeling one has during depressing moments when he prays fervently, with full faith.... It appears as if the very same prayer has been ingrained in my heart and I am still repeating it..."

Set in Allahabad after partition, the novel tells the story of Chander and Sudha. Chandrakumar Kapoor, "Chander", is a young researcher mentored by Dr. Shukla, a widower and a professor. Chander is close to Sudha, Dr. Shukla's daughter. The two share a deep, strong relationship, and their attraction grows over time. That Sudha is in love with Chander is clear to Sudha's best friend, Gesu, and Sudha's cousin Binti. Chander is from a lower caste than Sudha, so he doesn't dare ask her father for Sudha's hand in marriage. Although Sudha seems fairly 'modern', she cannot resist the social pressure to agree to marry a man of her father's choice; Chander also forces her to abide by her father's wishes.

== Analysis ==
The writer uses the story to hold a mirror up to society's socioeconomic divide, highlighting that while children are taught to follow society's values and judged by their ability to choose accordingly, constantly following those ideals can be psychologically corrosive. In those moments, resisting such ideas becomes not only a pragmatic individual choice, but also the only way society moves forward. Chandar has a choice: should he snatch Sudha from the clutches of social taboos, or should he let her go and sacrifice his love at the altar of ‘good’ behaviour?

Chandar makes the socially acceptable choice, and the consequences leave him fully aware of his feelings for Sudha. The agony of unrequited love slowly burns him inside. His calm, rational outlook on life gives way to a longing to untangle his emotions. He turns to Pammi, a Christian girl, to explore the physical side of love, which has so far been unknown to him. When even that doesn't alleviate his agony, he turns to Binti, searching for an emotional connection that doesn't exist. Over time, it becomes clear that he longs only for Sudha, and no one can replace her.

Bharti suggests that in the restrictive Indian society, young adults are expected to develop romantic feelings for anyone of the opposite sex they interact with regularly, as they have limited interaction with the opposite sex. Although they are exposed to the concept of a loving relationship between two adults, society treats marriage as a bond of compromise rather than a fulfilling relationship.

== Adaptations ==
In 1969, a film named ‘Ek tha Chander Ek thi Sudha’ was partially shot. The film starred Amitabh Bachchan and Jaya Bhaduri. It was an adaptation of this novel. However, the film got shelved.

In 2015, Garima Productions produced a television adaptation of the novel. The show, titled Ek Tha Chander Ek Thi Sudha, aired on Life OK and became available on the web portal Hotstar. Rahil Azim and Umang Jain starred in lead roles.

== Publication ==
- Gunaho Ka Devta, by Dharmveer Bharti published by Bhartiya Jnanpith. ISBN 81-263-1916-X.
