= The Sun's Seventh Horse =

1952 novel by Dharamvir Bharati

Suraj ka satvan godha
- Author: Dharamvir Bharati
- Original title: Suraj Ka Satvan Ghoda
- Working title: The Sun's Seventh Horse (1999)
- Translator: Sachchidananda Vatsyayan
- Language: English
- Genre: Meta fiction
- Publisher: National Book Trust
- Publication date: 1952
- Publication place: India
- Pages: 173
- ISBN: 81-237-2862-X
- OCLC: 571019615
- Preceded by: Gunahon Ka Devta (1949)
- Followed by: Andha Yug (1954)

The Sun's Seventh Horse (Hindi: सूरज का सातवाँ घोड़ा; Suraj Ka Satvan Ghoda) is a 1952 Hindi meta fiction novel by Dharamvir Bharati, one of the pioneers of modern Hindi literature. The novel presents three related narratives about three women: Jamuna, Sati, and Lily. It is narrated by Manik Mulla, who is also a character in the novel, to his friends over seven afternoons, in the style of Hitopadesha or Panchatantra. The novel looks at the disappointments in love faced by these women and how they cope with their lives. The self-reflexive story is also known for its subversive take on the "Devdas" syndrome. The Sun's Seventh Horse was published after Bharati's debut novel Gunahon Ka Devta (1949), which subsequently became a classic.

Sachchidananda Vatsyayan's (nom de plume: Agyeya) English translation of the novel was published in 1999. Its 46th edition was published by Bhartiya Jnanpith in 2012. In 1992, the novel was made into an eponymous film by director Shyam Benegal, starring Rajit Kapur, Raghuvir Yadav and Rajeshwari Sachdev. The film received wide acclaim and won the 1992 National Film Award for Best Feature Film in Hindi.
