= Dharamvir Bharati =

Indian Hindi poet and author (1926–1997)

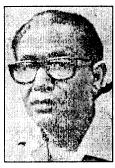
- Born: 25 December 1926; Allahabad, United Provinces, British India
- Died: 4 September 1997 (aged 70); Mumbai, Maharashtra, India
- Education: Allahabad University
- Occupations: Writer (essayist, novelist, poet)
- Spouse(s): Kanta Bharti (married 1954) (first wife), Pushpa Bharti (second. wife)
- Children: daughter Parmita (first wife); son Kinshuk Bharati and a daughter Pragya Bharati (second wife)
- Writing career
- Notable works: Gunahon Ka Devta (1949, novel); Suraj ka Satwan Ghoda (1952, novel); Andha Yug (1953, play)
- Notable awards: 1972: Padma Shri; 1984: Valley Turmeric Best Journalism Award; 1988: Best Playwright Maharana Mewar Foundation Award; 1989: Sangeet Natak Akademi; Rajendra Prasad Shikhar Samman; Bharat Bharati Samman; 1994: Maharashtra Gaurav; Kaudiya Nyas; Vyasa Samman

Dharamvir Bharati (25 December 1926 – 4 September 1997) was a Hindi poet, author, playwright and a social thinker from India. He was the chief editor of the Hindi weekly magazine Dharmayug, from 1960 till 1987.

Bharati was awarded the Padma Shree for literature in 1972 by the Government of India. His novel Gunaho Ka Devta became a classic. Bharati's Suraj ka Satwan Ghoda was adapted into a National Film Award-winning film of the same name in 1992 by Shyam Benegal. His play Andha Yug, set against the backdrop of the aftermath of Mahabharata, is frequently performed in public by drama groups.

He was awarded the Sangeet Natak Akademi Award in playwriting (Hindi) in 1988 by the Sangeet Natak Akademi, India's National Academy of Music, Dance and Drama.

== Early life ==
Dharamvir Bharati was born on 25 December 1926 in a Kayastha Family of Allahabad to Chiranji Lal and Chanda devi. The family underwent considerable financial hardships after his father died early. He had a sister, Dr. Veerbala.

He did his MA in Hindi from Allahabad University in 1946 and won the "Chintamani Ghosh Award" for securing highest marks in Hindi.

Dharamvir Bharati was the sub-editor for magazines Abhyudaya and Sangam during this period. He completed his PhD in 1954 under Dr. Dhirendra Verma on the topic of "Siddha Sahitya" and was appointed lecturer in Hindi at Allahabad University. The 1950s were the most creative period in Bharati's life: He wrote many novels, dramas, poems, essays, and critical works during this phase.

=== Journalism (Mumbai) ===
In 1960 he was appointed as chief-editor of the popular Hindi weekly magazine Dharmayug by the Times Group and moved to Bombay. He remained the editor of Dharmayug till 1987. During this long phase the magazine became the most popular Hindi weekly of the country and reached new heights in Hindi journalism. As a field reporter, Bharati personally covered the Indo-Pak war that resulted in the liberation of Bangladesh.

== Personal life ==
In 1954, Bharati married Kanta Bharati, with whom he had a daughter. He later married Pushpa Bharati; the couple had two children Kinshuk(son) & Pragya(Daughter).

Bharati developed heart ailments and died after a brief illness in 1997.

== Prominent works ==
=== Novels ===
- Gunaho Ka Devta (गुनाहों का देवता) (1949)
- Suraj ka Satwan Ghoda (सूरज का सातवां घोड़ा, 1952) (The Seventh Steed of the Sun) — A short novel published in 1952 that may be viewed as a set of connected mini-narratives can be called one of the foremost instances of metafiction in 20th century Hindi literature. The protagonist is a young man named Manik Mulla who recounts these tales to his friends. The name of the work is an allusion to Hindu mythology according to which the chariot of the Sun-God Surya is said to be drawn by seven horses. (viz. seven days in a week). This novella has been translated into Bengali by poet Malay Roy Choudhury of Hungry generation fame, for which he was bestowed with the Sahitya Academy Award. Shyam Benegal's film by the same name (1992), based on the novel, won the National Film Award for Best Actor.
- Gyarah sapno ka desh (ग्यारह सपनों का देश)
- Prarambh va Samapan (प्रारंभ व समापन)

=== Poetry ===
Kanupriya, Thanda Loha, Saat Geet Varsh, Sapana Abhi Bhi and Toota Pahiya are amongst his most popular works of poetry. Toota Pahiya tells a story of how a broken wheel helped Abhimanyu in the Mahabharata war.

=== Play in poetry ===
Andha Yug (The Age of Blindness) is a poetic play. Structured on events in the Mahabharata, Andha Yug focuses on the last day of the Mahabharata war. It is a powerful metaphorical work. It has been directed by Ebrahim Alkazi, Raj Bisaria, M.K. Raina, Ratan Thiyam, Arvind Gaur, Ram Gopal Bajaj, Mohan Maharishi, Bhanu Bharti [Pravin kumar gunjan ][Dr. Ashutosh Mhaskar]and many other Indian theatre directors.

=== Story collections ===
Drow Ka gaon (र्दों का गाव), Swarg aur Prathvhi (स्वर्ग और पृथ्वी), Chand aur Tute hue Log (चाँद और टूटे हुए लोग), Band gali Ka Aakhkri Makaan (बंद गली का आखिरी मकान), Saas ki Kalam se (सास की कलम से), Samasta Kahaniya ek Saath (समस्त कहानियाँ एक साथ)

=== Essays ===
Thele par Himalayas (ठेले पर हिमालय), Pashyanti stories: Ankahi (पश्यंती कहानियाँ :अनकही), The river was thirsty (नदी प्यासी थी), Neel Lake (नील झील), Human values and literature (मानव मूल्य और साहित्य), Cold iron (ठंडा लोहा)

=== Film about Bharati ===
Dr. Bharati: documentary directed by young story writer Uday Prakash for Sahitya Akademi, Delhi, 1999

== Awards ==
- Padma Shri by the Government of India, 1972
- Rajendra Prasad Shikhar Samman
- Bharat Bharati Samman
- Maharashtra Gaurav, 1994
- Kaudiya Nyas
- Vyasa Samman
- 1984, Valley turmeric best journalism awards
- 1988, best playwright Maharana Mewar Foundation Award
- 1989, the Sangeet Natak Akademi, Delhi

== Translations ==
- Andha Yug: Dharamvir Bharati, translated in English by Alok Bhalla, published by Oxford University Press. ISBN 978-0-19-567213-8, ISBN 0-19-567213-5
