= Umang Jain =

Indian actress

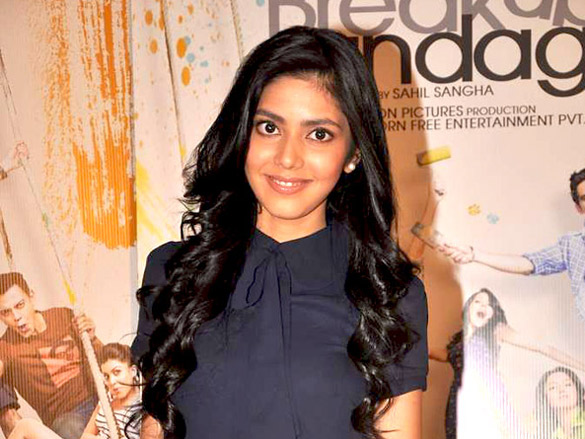
- Jain at her film launch Love Breakups Zindagi promotional event
- Born: Tumkur, India
- Citizenship: Indian
- Occupations: Model, Actress
- Awards: AIAC - All India Achievers Award for best actor
- Website: www.umangjain.com

Umang Jain is an Indian model and actress worked in national and international circuits. She is officially the youngest actor to have worked across all AV mediums and is awarded for the same. She is also popularly known as the 'Cadbury Girl' in India and 'Miss Masala Girl' in Pakistan from where she rose to fame. She has worked in Films, Series and has shot for more than 500TVCs.

== Career ==
She began in the Hindi film industry with Love Breakups Zindagi and later appeared in Ek Tha Chander Ek Thi Sudha. In 2015, she portrayed Gauri, an incarnation of Devi/Durga in the three month television series, Maharakshak: Devi. She was cast in the role partly due to her background as a dancer and a brown belt in the martial arts. Jain states that she was drawn to the role because it was a challenging one.

Jain also portrayed Tara in the long-running show Yeh Rishta Kya Kehlata Hai on Star Plus. About her character, Umang said, "I play Tara in the show. She is a hockey player, who is slightly rough on the edges as she has been raised in a family of men but she is a soft and sweet person inside. She always stands up for what is right."

== Television ==
Year	Serial	Role
2002	Justujoo	Rima Sharma
2002	Yeh Hai Mere Apne	
2004	Karishma kaa Karishma	
2004	Gharwali Uparwali	
2006	Ssshhhh...Phir Koi Hai - Do Gaz Zameen Ke Neeche	Kanchan Goel (Episode 72 & 73)
2007	Break Time Masti Time	Mahua
2008	Sunaina	Nina Kutty
2009	Chua Mantar	
2012	Teri Meri Love Stories	Kareena Sood
2015	Maharakshak: Devi	Devi / Gauri
2015	Ek Tha Chander Ek Thi Sudha	Sudha Shukla
2015-2016	Yeh Rishta Kya Kehlata Hai	Nayantara "Tara" Singh Shekhawat
2016	Khatmal E Ishq	Lovina D' Mello
2018	Laal Ishq	Siddhi
2019	Laal Ishq	Sona
2019	Laal Ishq	Khushi

== Filmography ==
Year	Film	Role	Language
2011	Love Breakups Zindagi	Ritu	Hindi
2011	Shakal Pe Mat Ja	Prachi	Hindi
2013	Aaru Sundarimaarude Katha	Anju Moothedan	Malayalam
