= Bhanu Bharti =

Indian playwright and theatre director

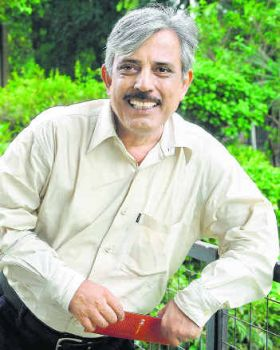
- Born: 1947 (age 78–79); Ajmer, Rajasthan
- Occupations: Theatre Director & Playwright
- Awards: Sangeet Natak Akademi Award – Direction – 1997
- Website: www.bhanubharti.com

Bhanu Bharti (born 1947) is an Indian theatre director, playwright and the founding director of Aaj Rangmandal theatre group. Most known for his theatre productions and choreographies with tribal and folk artists, including Pashu Gayatri by K.N. Panikkar, Kaal Katha and Amar Beej, all are based on rituals of the Bhil tribe of Mewar region of Rajasthan, apart from Chandrama Singh urf Chamku Das, Yamgatha and Aks-Tamasha, counting to over 70 plays in a career spanning nearly four decades.

== Early life and education ==
Bhanu Bharti was born in 1947 in Ajmer, Rajasthan. He graduated from National School of Drama in 1973, winning the Best all Round student and the best Director awards. Later he studied traditional theatre of Japan at the University of Tokyo.

== Career ==
He has over fifty productions to his credit. His major works are: Chandrama Singh urf Chamku, Ras Gandharva, Azar Ka Khwab, and Yamgatha. His productions like Pashu Gayatri, Kai Katha, and Amar Beej are based on his study of the performances and rituals of the Bheel tribe of the Mewar region of Rajasthan. He has also directed a film on Gavari, the dance theatre of the Bhil.

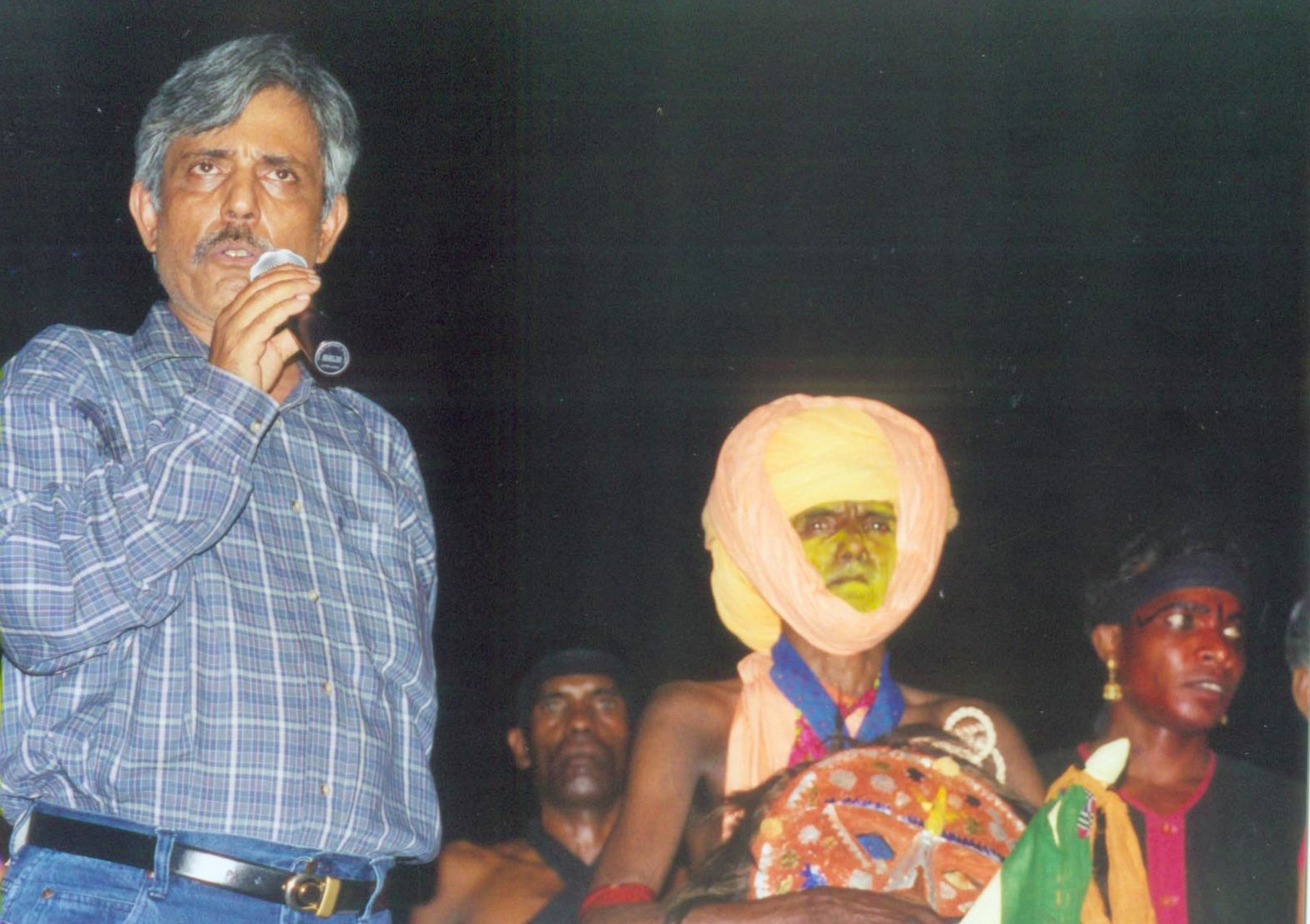
Banubarati, Drama Director addressing audience at Sopanam, Kollam

Bhanu Bharti headed the Drama Department of Rajasthan University, Jaipur, from its inception in 1976 till 1978. He has also taught dramatic literature, scenic design, and acting in many renowned institutions, including NSD. He has served as the Director of the Shri Ram Centre for Performing Arts, Delhi, and headed Bharatiya Lok Kala Mandal, Udaipur and worked with Bhil tribesmen of the Gogunda belt near Udaipur. He was also the Chairman of Rajasthan Sangeet Natak Akademi and the Rajasthan Sahitya Akademi.

An artist who is perceptive enough to reveal inner psychological world of characters and the inherent philosophic and mythical undercurrents of drama, Bhanu had directed number of plays to provide his view point on many relevant social issues and worked with both rural and urban breed of actors and thus, gave Indian Theatre a new meaning altogether.

In 2004, a three-day theatre festival of his plays was held at Tagore theatre, Chandigarh. His 2010 play, Doobi Ladki brings together three short stories by Russian writer Nikolai Gogol, including May Night, or the Drowned Maiden, The Overcoat, and The Nose.

== Awards ==
Bhanu Bharti has been honoured with many prestigious National Awards for his contribution to the field of theatre including the Sangeet Natak Akademi Award in the year 1997 given by the Sangeet Natak Akademi, India's National Academy for Music, Dance and Drama, Rajasthan Sahitya Akademi Award and Rajasthan Sangeet Natak Akademi Award. Bharti received the Kalidas Alankaran Samman for theatre 2022.
