= Mohan Maharishi =

Indian theatre director (1940–2023)

- Born: 30 January 1940; Ajmer, India
- Died: 9 May 2023 (aged 83)
- Occupation: Playwright
- Awards: Sangeet Natak Akademi Award Direction, 1992
- Website: mohanmaharishi.in

Mohan Maharishi (30 January 1940 – 9 May 2023) was an Indian theatre director, actor, and playwright. He was awarded the Sangeet Natak Akademi Award for Direction in 1992.

== Early life ==
Mohan Maharishi graduated from National School of Drama, New Delhi in 1965, and later served as its director 1984-86.

== Career ==
Mohan Maharishi is most known for his plays in Hindi, such as Einstein (1994), Raja Ki Rasoi Vidyottamā, and Saanp Seedhi as well as Hindi plays that he had directed over the years, including Andhayug, Rani Jindan (Punjabi), Othello, Ho Rahega Kuchh Na Kuchh (inspired by Marsha Norman's 1983 English play 'Night, Mother), and Dear Bapu (2008). Amongst notable plays written by him include Einstein, Raja Ki Rasoi, Joseph Ka Mukadma, Deewar Mein Ek Khirkee Rahati Thi, and Ho Rahega Kuch Na Kuch. He had also appeared in the historical series Bharat Ek Khoj as Muslim social reformer Sir Syed Ahmed Khan.

From 1973 to 1979, he was the theatre advisor to the government of Mauritius. After his return from Mauritius he taught at the department of Indian Theatre at Panjab University, Chandigarh, and in 1987 he started his second tenure as professor and became its department head. He lived in Chandigarh until his retirement in 2004, and then moved back to New Delhi to set up the Natwa Theatre Society.

Maharishi was known for his simplistic and heartwarming productions and is widely regarded as one of the best directors Indian theatre has ever produced.

== Death ==
Maharishi died on 9 May 2023, at the age of 83.
