= Manohar Shyam Joshi =

Indian writer, journalist and scriptwriter

- Joshi in 1986
- Born: 9 August 1933; Ajmer, Ajmer State, British India
- Died: 30 March 2006 (aged 72); New Delhi, India
- Education: B.Sc., 1952 (University of Lucknow)
- Occupations: Writer, essayist, columnist, journalist
- Spouse: Dr. Bhagwati Joshi
- Children: Anupam Joshi; Anurag Joshi; Ashish Joshi

Manohar Shyam Joshi (9 August 1933 – 30 March 2006) was a Hindi writer, journalist and scriptwriter, most well known as the writer of Indian television's first soap opera, Hum Log (1984) and his early hits Buniyaad (1987), Kakaji Kahin, a political satire and many experimental novels including Kasap and Kyap, which won him the Sahitya Akademi Award.

== Biography ==
Manohar Shyam Joshi was born on 9 August 1933 at Ajmer in Rajasthan, the son of a noted educationist and musicologist belonging to a Kumaoni family from Almora, Uttar Pradesh now in the state of Uttarakhand. He is the father of leading AI and cybersecurity expert Professor Anupam Joshi.

He died on 30 March 2006, at the age of 73, in New Delhi, India. He is survived by his wife, Dr. Bhagwati Joshi, and sons, Anupam Joshi, Anurag Joshi and Ashish Joshi. Upon his death, Prime Minister Manmohan Singh called him "one of the most influential writers and commentators in Hindi in recent times".

According to Khushwant Singh, the eminent author, editor and critic,"By the time he died in 2006, he was recognised as the first and the most innovative writer of Hindi."

== Career ==
=== Television ===
He is often called "the Father of Indian Soap Operas" being the writer of India's first television soap opera, Hum Log. Made in 1982, when television was still a luxury item for the majority of Indians, the serial dealt with the everyday struggles of the middle-class India, making it an instant hit, especially because every Indian could identify with it. Another popular creation was Buniyaad (1987–1988), directed by Ramesh Sippy, a serial based around the life a family displaced by the Partition of India in 1947; both went on to deeply influence an entire generation of Indians as well as the Indian television industry.

In the following years he wrote many more long running serials such as Mungeri Lal Ke Hasin Sapney, Kakaji Kahin, Humrahi, Zameen Aasman and Gatha.

=== Novels ===
Manohar Shyam Joshi is also known for his novels which have dealt with topics ranging from love, in Kasap, described as one of the greatest love stories in Hindi, to devastating political satire including Netaji Kahin.

He was a prominent post-modernist authors in modern Hindi literature, as amiably demonstrated by his cult novel Kuru kuru Swaahaa and his novella Hariya Hercules ki Hairaani. He was awarded the prestigious Sahitya Akademi Award in 2005 for Hindi, for his novel Kyap, an allegory of modern India, known for its sensitive portrayal of the Kumaoni traditions of his home state of Uttarakhand.

=== Films ===
He had a penchant for romance, subtle comedy and satire alike. This allowed him to write for cinema on a variety of subjects, such as Hey Ram, Appu Raja, Papa Kahte Hain and Brashtachar. He was a dubbing expert of much ability and dubbed for films including Appu Raja and Hey Ram.

=== Journalism ===
He had a long stint as a journalist in broadcast and the print media. He worked first with All India Radio, New Delhi, in the Hindi news section and then with the Films Division of India in Mumbai, where he wrote the scripts for many documentaries. This is when he started writing his famous landmark interviews with ordinary folks, which were serialised in the Sarika magazine. It was not long before he was handpicked by Sachchidananda Hirananda Vatsyayan Agyeya for a new Hindi news magazine Dinaman, being brought out by the Times of India group. Agyeya was to be the editor and Joshi the assistant editor.

Later, he edited the leading Hindi magazine Saptahik Hindustan, concurrently with the English Weekend Review and, in late 70s, the Morning Echo weekly all brought out by the Hindustan Times.

His journalistic writings have covered a wide range of topics from popular science and travelogues to political analyses. Until his death, he wrote an opinion column for Outlook Saptahik, the Hindi magazine from Outlook India.

== Literary works ==
- Kasap
- Netaji Kahin (political satire made into a memorable TV series Kakkaji Kahin, by Basu Chatterji)
- Kuru Kuru Swaahaa
- Hariya Hercules Ki Hairani (Rajkamal & Sons, 1999. ISBN 81-7178-775-4.Hariya Harquelize Ki Hairani (HINDI) by Manohar Shyam Joshi English translation of The Perplexity of Haria Hercules by Robert Hueckstedt)
- Prabhu Tum Kaise Kissago (short stories)
- Mandir Ghaat ki Pauriyaan (short stories)
- Uss Desh Ka Yaron Kya Kahna
- Baton Baton Mein (interviews)
- Kaise Kissago
- Kasap
- Ek Durlabh Vyaktitva (short stories)
- Lucknow Mera Lucknow (memoirs of student days)
- Gatha Kurukshetra Ki (play) Gatha Kurukshetra Ki (HINDI) by Manohar Shyam Joshi
- Seemaant Diary – Kashmir Se Kachh Tak (travelogue) Gatha Kurukshetra Ki (HINDI) by Manohar Shyam Joshi
- 21st Century (essays and opinions)
- T'ta Professor, also an award-winning English translation by Ira Pande https://www.penguin.co.in/
- Kyaap, winner of Sahitya Academy Award 2005
- Hamzad, Rajkamal & Sons, 1999. ISBN 81-7178-776-2. Hamzad (HINDI) by Manohar Shyam Joshi
- Main Kaun Hoon? an exploration on identity loosely based on the real life Bhawal Sanyasi case, of the prince who came back from the dead to reclaim his life, love and kingdom.
- Vadhasthal (National Book Trust, India, 2009): A novel set in the killing fields of Cambodia
- Kapeeshji (NBT, India, 2009): Novel about the evolution of an unselfmade godman.

== Television serials ==
- Hum Log (1982)
- Buniyaad (1987)
- Kakaji Kahin
- Mungerilal Ke Haseen Sapne
- Hamrahi
- Zameen Aasman (1995)
- Gatha (1997)

== Filmography ==
- Bhrashtachar (1989) – Screenplay
- Papa Kehte Hai
- Appu Raja
- Hey Ram (2000) – Dialogue

== Works in translation ==
- T'Ta Professor (2008), translated by Ira Pande ISBN 978-0-670-08209-4, winner of Vodafone Crossword Book Award for best translated work.
- Hariya Hercules ki Hairani, translated by Robert Hueckstedt

== Awards ==
- MP Sahitya Parishad Samman
- Sharad Joshi Samman
- Shikhar Samman
- Delhi Hindi Academy Award
- Onida and Uptron Award for TV writing
- 2005 Sahitya AcademyAward

== See also ==
- Kumauni People
