= Ab Insaf Hoga =

- Promotionl Poster
- Directed by: Harish Shah
- Story by: V K Sharma
- Produced by: Vinod Shah
- Starring: Mithun Chakraborty; Rekha; Rohini Hattangadi; Farooq Shaikh; Prem Chopra
- Cinematography: S M Anwar
- Music by: Anand–Milind
- Release date: 6 January 1995
- Running time: 125 minutes
- Language: Hindi

Ab Insaf Hoga is a 1995 Indian Hindi-language action film directed by Harish Shah, starring Mithun Chakraborty, Rekha, Rohini Hattangadi, Farooq Shaikh and Prem Chopra. The movie was released on 6 January 1995.

== Plot ==
Janki (Rekha) lives a poor lifestyle in a small village consisting of her dad, Bhervi Prasad and her mom. She meets and falls in love with her school-teacher, Ramcharan, and both want to get married. Ramcharan's brother is opposed to this marriage as Bhervi is unable to pay any dowry, but the couple are turned out of Kalicharan (Raza Murad)'s house, and instead go to live with Ramcharan's friend, Ashok Mishra. Ashok attempts to molest Janki, and a fight breaks out between Ramsharan and Ashok, and they move back to Janki's village where she finds that her parents have killed themselves. They decide to live in the village where Janki gives birth to a baby, Khusboo. Ramcharan is then assaulted by Ashok and receives a head injury that leaves him paralyzed. Janki takes him to Bombay, finds a job as a laborer, and takes Ramcharan to see a doctor, it will cost her a lot of money. She approaches her employer, Girdharilal (Prem Chopra), who is willing to pay the entire cost of her husband's treatment provided she sleeps with him, when she refuses, she does not get any money and is instead molested. Ramcharan does recover a little, and goes to confront Girdharilal, but gets killed. The police refuse to register any complaint against Girdharilal. Alone, traumatized, and devastated Janki and Khusboo wander aimlessly. She gets into an accident with a car that belongs to Gaurishankar (Mithun Chakraborty), a local gangster with a good heart, who wants to be a Municipal Councillor. With Janki's help he does become a Councillor and both entrap Girdharilal, and then subsequently Ashok and Kalicharan, get them arrested on a variety of criminal charges and jailed. What Janki and Gaurishankar do not know is that the trio have gotten together in prison and have planned a devious scheme that will ensure that Janki gets killed - without implicating any one of them.

== Cast ==
- Mithun Chakraborty as Gaurishankar
- Rekha as Jankidevi Prasad
- Rohini Hattangadi as Judge
- Farooq Shaikh as Ramcharan
- Prem Chopra as Girdharilal
- Shafi Inamdar as Ashok Mishra
- Raza Murad as Kalicharan
- Sulabha Deshpande as Kashibai
- Javed Khan as Ram Singh Ashok's friend
- Yunus Parvez as Bashir Khan
- Harish Patel as Bansi, Mukadam
- Shail Chaturvedias Builder Saxena
- Parikshat Sahni as Inspector Khan
- Himani Shivpuri as Mrs. Razia Kalicharan
- Rohini Hattangadi as Judge
- Ghanshyam Rohera as Manglu
- Padma Rani as Mrs. B. Prasad
- Ram Mohan as Bhairvi Prasad
- Sahila Chadha as Sabina B. Khan
- T. P. Jain as Sabina's father
- Ashwini Kaushal as Manish Khanna
- Deepika Amin as Khushboo Prasad, Janakidevi Daughter

== Soundtrack ==
All lyrics are written by Anand Bakshi; all music is composed by Anand–Milind.

Songs
No.	Title	Playback	Length
1.	"Yeh Behki Behki Chaal"	Kumar Sanu, Alka Yagnik
2.	"Pehli Milan Ki Raat"	Abhijeet, Kavita Krishnamurthy
3.	"Mere Jhumkon Ne"	Sadhana Sargam, Poornima
4.	"No Problem"	Abhijeet, Sadhana Sargam
5.	"Mahue Ka Ghoont"	Vinod Rathod
6.	"Barso Ke Baad Maine"	Alka Yagnik
