= Varat Aali Gharat =

- Theatrical release poster
- Directed by: Vijay Gokhale
- Produced by: Krushnanand
- Starring: Bharat Jadhav; Alka Kubal Athalye; Vijay Gokhle; Neelam Shirke; Anshuman Vichare; Prajakta Hanmdhar; Ajita Kulkarni; Jaywant Bhalekar
- Music by: Dyanesh Kumar
- Release date: 24 February 2009
- Country: India
- Language: Marathi

Varat Aali Gharat is a Marathi movie released on 24 February 2009. The movie is produced by Krushnanand and directed by Vijay Gokhale.

== Cast ==
The cast includes Bharat Jadhav, Klka Kubal Aathalye, Vijay Gokhle, Neelam Shirke, Anshuman Vichare, Prajakta Hanmdhar, Ajita Kulkarni, Jaywant Bhalekar & Others.

== Soundtrack ==
The music is provided by Dyanesh Kumar.
