= Vichare =

Vichare is an Indian surname. Notable people with the surname include:

- Anshuman Vichare (born 1975), Indian actor, producer, and television personality
- Rajan Vichare (born 1 August 1961), Indian politician
