= Raghubir Yadav =

Indian actor (born 1957)

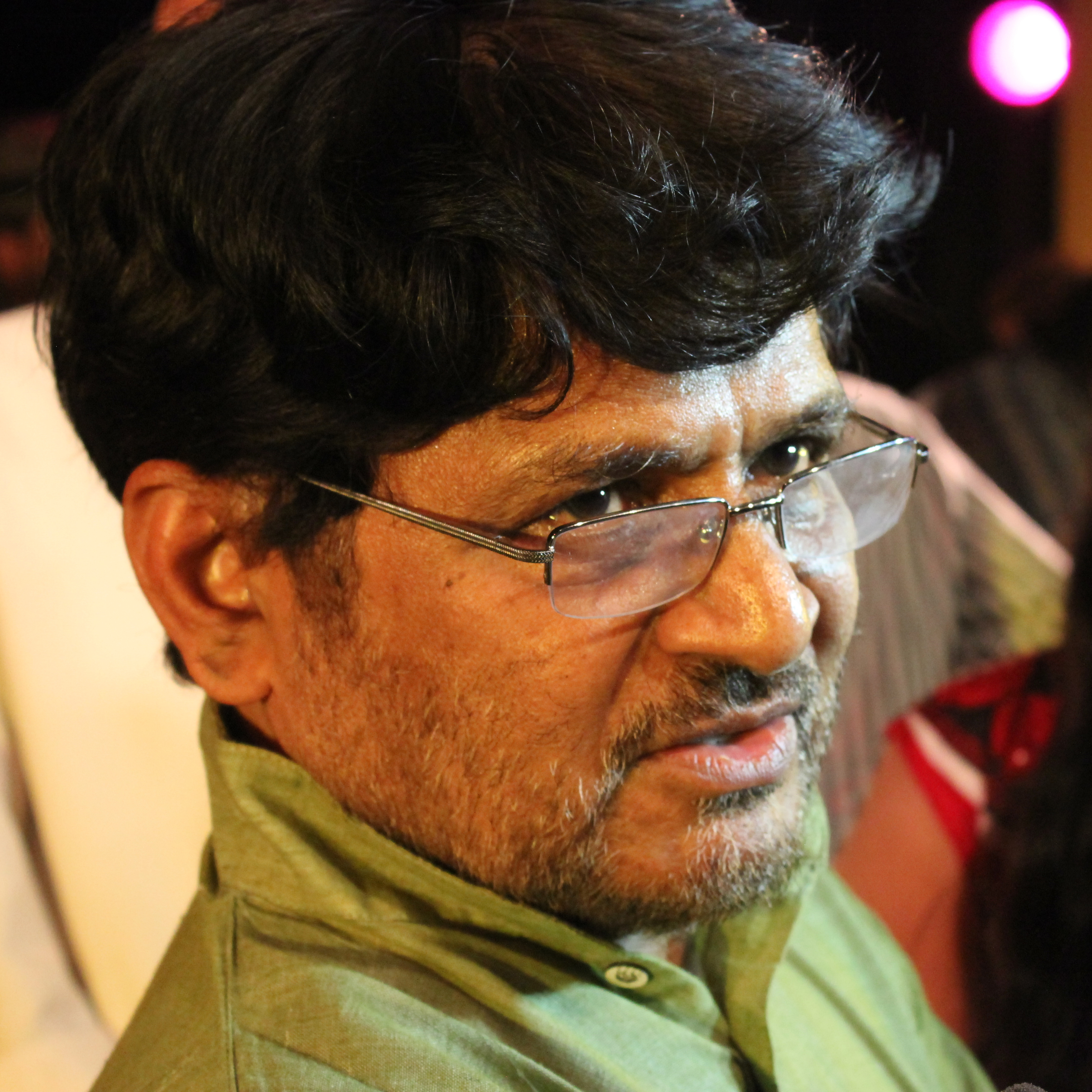
- Yadav at Madhya Pradesh School of Drama (MPSD), Bhopal in November 2014
- Born: 25 June 1957 (age 69); Jabalpur, Madhya Pradesh, India
- Education: National School of Drama
- Occupations: Actor; singer; writer
- Years active: 1985–present
- Spouses: Poornima (divorced): Roshni Achreja
- Children: 2 (Achal Yadav and Abir Yadav)

Raghubir Yadav is an Indian actor, music composer, singer and set designer who works in Hindi films. He made his film debut with Massey Sahib (1985), in which he played the title role. He has won two International Awards as Best Actor for Massey Sahib, FIPRESCI Critic's Award, Venice Film Festival, 1986 and the IFFI Best Actor Award (Male): Silver Peacock Award at the 11th International Film Festival of India, 1987. The film also featured writer and social activist in National School of Drama, New Delhi until 1977.

== Career ==
"I have never thought about or calculated these things as my entire focus is on giving my best as an actor. I don’t pay attention on a film going for Oscars, I feel if the film is good then it will get the love and recognition it deserves.."

— Raghubir Yadav on A Unique Connection With Oscars

=== Theatre ===
Yadav has performed as an actor and singer in over 70 plays and about 2500 shows, travelling in caravans, living in tents and performing on makeshift stages in villages, towns and cities of India with the Parsi Theatre Company (1967–1973). He was with the Rangoli Puppet Theatre, Lucknow (1973–1974), performing with glove puppets. At the National School of Drama Repertory (1977–1986), he acted in about 40 plays in over 2000 shows. He has also contributed to music, sets, costumes and masks.

=== Film ===
He was seen in many milestone films in the following decades. He has starred in three films that have received Academy Award nominations for Best Foreign Language Film namely, Salaam Bombay!, Water and Lagaan. Raghubir Yadav is one of the few Indian actors to have received the Silver Peacock Best Actor Award, at the International Film Festival of India. His most acclaimed role was as the drug addicted "Chillum" in Salaam Bombay! (1988). He has acted in Firaaq. In 2011, he played the lead role in the film Dear Friend Hitler, which derives its name from the two letters Mahatma Gandhi wrote Adolf Hitler, in 1939, immediately before World War II, and on Christmas Eve in 1940, after the war had started, to prevent and to stop the war.

=== Television ===
Yadav started his television career with the television program Mungerilal Ke Haseen Sapne (1989), playing the lead character "Mungerilal" and in the television series Amaravathi ki Kathayein (1994-1995).

Later, he played the roles of Haji Nasruddin in the television program Mullah Nasruddin (also spelled as Mulla Nasiruddin) and the lead in Chacha Chaudhary. He also played the lead role in Arjun Pandit.

=== Music ===
- He composed and sang in films that include Maya Memsaab, Massey Sahib, Rudaali, Aasmaan Se Gira, O Darling Yeh Hai India, Samar, Sunday, Darna Mana hai, Ramaji London Waale, Billu and Dilli 6. He sang the title song of Chacha Chaudhary. He sang a song in Amir Khan's Peepli Live called "Mehngai Dayain" with bhadwai village mandli in which he was later praised by many of Indian film fraternity and public at large.
- He provided singing and voice for ads: Pepsi, Parle, Vim, Kotak Mahindra, Icy Cool Mint, Coke, Midday, Bagh Bakari Chai, Crack cream, Maggie Mania, Britannia etc.
- He also sang and composed the famous MP tourism ad -'MP ajab hai, sabse gajab hai'
- He composed the music for Ghasiram Kotwal, Chotte Sayeed Bade Sayeed, Chaupra Kamaal Naukar Jamal and Chacha Chaudhary, ballet for song and drama division. Composed and sang "Maggie Mania", conceived, written and composed by Ramlila for Dilli 6.
- He recently collaborated with Hitesh Sonik to sing 'Lamh Tera' in the second episode of Coke Studio @ MTV, Season 2. The show was aired on MTV India on 14 July and this song was the fifth and last to be shown on the show. The song is a folk song from Madhya Pradesh. In ancient times, the journey from one place to another would take days. People while travelling would then usually sing to ensure everyone is safe. This style of singing was called 'lum tera'. A member/group at the front of the caravan would sing loudly (lambi ter) and the members/groups at the end would sing back as a response, thereby ensuring connectivity.
- He has sung a song, "Bhagan ke Rekhan ki bahangiya" in the movie Issaq. Raghubir has shown his talent again.

== Awards ==
- Silver Peacock for the Best Actor Award (Male): Massey Sahib at the 11th International Film Festival of India (1987).
- FIPRESCI Critic's Award, Venice for Best Actor: Massey Sahib (1986).
- Best Supporting Actor (Male) (Comedy Series) at 2020 Filmfare OTT Awards for Panchayat.

== Filmography ==
Key
†	Denotes films that have not yet been released

List of Raghubir Yadav film credits
Year	Title	Role	Notes	Ref.
1985	Massey Sahib	Francis Massey		
1988	Salaam Bombay!	Chillum		
1989	In Which Annie Gives It Those Ones		English film	
1990	Disha			
1991	Kasba			
1992	Electric Moon	Boltu	English film	
1992	Aasman Se Gira			
1992	Dharavi			
1992	Suraj Ka Satvan Ghoda	Narrator — friend of Manik Mulla		
1992	Kubi Matthu Iyala		Kannada film	
1993	Rudaali	Adult Budhua		
1993	Maya Memsaab			
1993	Papeeha	Bichhua		
1993	Sardar	Sardar Patel's Servant		
1993	Chor Aur Chand	Hero		
1994	Bandit Queen	Madho		
1994	1942: A Love Story	Munna		
1994	Udhaar Ki Zindagi			
1995	Dushmani	Raghu		
1995	Nirantharam		Telugu film	
1996	Khamoshi: The Musical	Willie		
1996	Damu		Bengali film	
1997	Saaz			
1997	Rui Ka Bhoj			
1998	Dil Se..	Shuklaji AIR manager		
1998	X-ZONE			
1999	Shaheed-E-Mohabbat	Ramzani (mentally challenged)		
1999	Samar			
2000	Tarkieb	Nainsukh (Blind shopkeeper)		
2000	Bawandar	Sohan (Saanvri's husband)		
2001	Lagaan	Bhura (seamer), the poultry farmer		
2001	Asoka	Maurya soldier		
2002	Yatharth			
2002	Tum Se Achcha Kaun Hai	Manto		
2002	Kuch Tum Kaho Kuch Hum Kahein	Chaturvedi		
2002	Agni Varsha	Actor Manager (Sutradhar)		
2003	Aanch	Chilkona		
2003	Darna Mana Hai	Dayashankar Pandey (teacher)	Story segment: Homework	
2003	Kahan Ho Tum			
2003	Raasta	Tayar Da (Neel's Friend)	Bengali film	
2004	Meenaxi: A Tale of Three Cities	Nawab		
2004	Gayab	Vishnu's Father		
2004	Deewaar	Jata		
2005	Water	Gulabi		
2006	Anthony Kaun Hai?	Raghuu		
2007	Aaja Nachle	Doctor Saab		
2008	Firaaq	Karim		
2009	Dilli 6			
2009	Yeh Khula Aasmaan	Rohit Nayyar		
2009	Thanks Maa	Peon		
2010	Peepli Live	Budhia		
2011	Gandhi To Hitler	Adolf Hitler		
2012	Aalaap			
2012	8:08 Er Bongaon Local	A Rickshaw puller	Bengali film	
2012	Married 2 America	Raghu		
2013	Minugurulu	Surdas	Telugu film	
2013	Club 60	Manu Bhai		
2015	Piku	Dr. Srivastava		
2015	The Silence		(Marathi, Hindi)	
2015	Meinu Ek Ladki Chaahiye			
2016	Bhouri	Dhanua		
2017	Shentimental		Marathi film	
2017	Newton	Loknath		
2017	Mantostaan	Sirajuddin		
2018	Sui Dhaaga	Mauji's Father		
2018	Love per Square Foot	Bhaskar Chaturvedi	released on Netflix	
2018	Taking the horse to eat Jalebis	Chhadami		
2019	Romeo Akbar Walter	Mudassar		
2019	Aadhaar			
2019	Jacqueline I Am Coming	Kashi Tiwary		
2019	Make In India	Muikhiya		
2020	Ghoomketu	Dadda	Released on ZEE5	
2020	Aajkal Ki Aurtein!	Old Man	short film	
2021	Jamun	Jamun Prashad	Eros Now	
2021	Pagglait	Pappu Giri	Netflix	
2021	Sandeep Aur Pinky Faraar	Uncle	Prime Video	
2021	Chehre	Hariya Jadhav		
2022	Jaggu Ki Lalten	Jaggu		
2023	Kathal	Gulab Seth		
2023	Yaatris	Pushkar Sharma		
2023	Minus 31: The Nagpur Files	Anupam Sharma		
2025	Bhool Chuk Maaf	Raghunath		
2025	Hari Ka Om	Om		

=== Web series ===
List of Raghubir Yadav web series credits
Year	Title	Role	Platform	Notes
2020–present	Panchayat	Brij Bhushan Dubey	Amazon Prime Video	4 seasons
2021	Ray	Hakim Sahab (Doctor)	Netflix	Episode; Hungama Kyon Hai Barpa
2022	Kaun Banegi Shikharwati	Mishra Ji	ZEE5	
2022	The Great Indian Murder	Mohan Kumar	Disney+ Hotstar	
2023	The Railway Men	Railway Guard	Netflix	
2025	Mandala Murders	Kaivalya Shastri	Netflix	
2026	Hunkkaar: The Roar	Sunil Chakosi (Baapji)	Disney + Hotstar	
