= Sankaramanchi =

Sankaramanchi (Telugu: శంకరమంచి) is a Telugu Brahmin surname. Notable people with the surname include:

- Sankaramanchi Janaki, popularly known as Sowcar Janaki, is a South Indian actress
- Satyam Sankaramanchi (1937–1987), popular Telugu writer
