= Shail Chaturvedi =

Indian actor

- Born: 29 June 1936; Amravati, Maharashtra
- Died: 29 October 2007 (aged 71); Malad, Mumbai, India
- Citizenship: Indian
- Occupations: Poet, Humorist, Lyricist, Actor
- Children: Vishal, Vihan, Vivek
- Relatives: Akash Chaturvedi (Nephew) Janmanshi Chaturvedi (Granddaughter) Amla Chaturvedi (Granddaughter) Krishna Chaturvedi (Grandson) Shaunak Chaturvedi (Grandson) Swayam Chaturvedi (Grandson) Manish Chaturvedi
- Writing career
- Genre: Humor

Shail Chaturvedi (29 June 1936 – 29 October 2007) was a Hindi poet, satirist, humorist, lyricist and actor from India, most known for his political satire in the 70s and the 80s.

He worked as a character actor in several Hindi films and TV series.

== Career ==
He started his career as a lecturer at Allahabad University, soon started taking part in various Kavi sammelan (poetry gatherings), and with his tongue-in-cheek political commentary, made a place for himself amidst leading humorists, hasya kavi of the 1970s and 1980s, like Kaka Hathrasi, Pradeep Chaubey and Ashok Chakradhar.

He became a regular feature of the annual kavi sammelan [Poets' conference] on Doordarshan, state-run TV channel, around the Holi festival. He also acted in a number of Hindi films, like Uphaar (1971), Chitchor (1976), Chameli Ki Shaadi (1986) and Kareeb (1998). He played the role of "Sharma ji", the boss of Keshav and Gokhale in the famous sitcom Shrimaan Shrimati

He died on 29 October 2007, after suffering from chronic kidney failure for some time, and was survived by his wife Daya and three sons.

== Selected filmography ==
=== Films ===
Year	Film	Role	Notes
1971	Uphaar	Shankarlal	
1972	Mere Bhaiya	Publisher	
1976	Chitchor	Chaubey	
1980	Payal Ki Jhankaar	Dinanath	
1980	Jazbaat	Havaldar Pandey	
1985	Hum Do Hamare Do		
1986	Chameli Ki Shaadi	Lachchuram Kaphanchi (Makhkhan's Father)	
1988	Maar Dhaad	Lawyer, Public Prosecutor	
1990	Jawani Zindabad	Minister	
1991	Narsimha	Seema's dad	
1992	Ghar Jamai	Pyaray Lal's (Kader Khan) father	
1993	Dhanwan	Hamidbhai	
1994	Zid (1994 film)	Education Minister	
1995	Ab Insaf Hoga	Builder Saxena	
1998	Kareeb		
1998	Tirchhi Topiwale		

=== Television ===
Year	Serial	Role	Channel	Notes
1988	Kakaji Kahin	Netaji(Gajanand Babu)	DD National	
1993	Zabaan Sambhalke	School Inspector	DD Metro	
1993	Yeh Duniya Gazab Ki	Boss of Office	DD	
1994-1999	Shrimaan Shrimati	Bablu Prasad Sharma (Keshav's boss)	DD Metro	
1996	Kuch Bhi Ho Sakta Hai	Fake sage	DD Metro	
1997	Byomkesh Bakshi - Episode: Wasiyat ka Rahasya	Rameshwar	DD National	Episodic role

== Works ==
- Bazar Ka Ye Hal Hai, Pub. Shri Hindi Sahitya Sansar, 1988.
- Chal Gayi, Fusion Books. ISBN 9788128810145.
