= Ghode Ko Jalebi Khilane Le Ja Riya Hoon =

2018 film

- Ghode Ko Jalebi Khilane Le Ja Riya Hoon Official Poster
- Directed by: Anamika Haksar
- Written by: Anamika Haksar & Lokesh Jain
- Screenplay by: Anamika Haksar
- Produced by: Gutterati Productions
- Starring: Ravindra Sahu, K. Gopalan, Raghubir Yadav, Lokesh Jain
- Cinematography: Saumyananda Sahi
- Edited by: Paresh Kamdar
- Music by: Vikram Sherma
- Production company: Gutterati Productions
- Distributed by: Platoon Distribution
- Release dates: 2018 (MAMI); 10 June 2022
- Running time: 121 Minutes
- Country: India
- Language: Hindi

Ghode Ko Jalebi Khilane Le Ja Riya Hoon (Taking the horse to eat Jalebis) is a 2018 Indian film produced by Gutterati Productions.

This film is a result of seven years of documentation of the lives of street people of Old Delhi – beggars, pickpockets, loaders, small-scale factory workers, street singers, street vendors, etc. The film was directed by Anamika Haksar.

The film was described as a "masterpiece of contemporary Indian cinema" by Kinoscope It has won awards both internationally and nationally and has been screened at numerous film festivals

Ghode Ko Jalebi Khilane Le Ja Riya Hoon first premiered at the Mumbai Academy of the Moving Image (MAMI) festival in 2018. It was also the only film to be selected to Sundance New Frontier Festival in the year 2019.

Anamika Haksar's debut feature film, Ghode Ko Jalebi Khilane Le Ja Riya Hoon, which released in selected theatres on 10 June 2022. Two years after it was selected to be screened in The New Frontiers section of the Sundance Film Festival, the only Indian film in that category.

== Plot ==
Ghode Ko Jalebi Khilane Le Ja Riya Hoon follows four main characters: a pickpocket, a vendor of sweet and savoury snacks, a labourer-activist, and a conductor of 'Heritage Walks'.

Patru, the pickpocket, decides to take people on alternative walks, showing them the underbelly of the city but this causes trouble with local merchants and the police. He decides to conduct one last 'Dream Walk'When Lali, the labourer-activist, too joins the fray, giving a speech urging workers to unite, he lands them all in jail.

== Cast ==
- Raghuvir Yadav as Chhadami
- Ravindra Sahu as Patru
- Gopalan as Lal Bihari
- Lokesh Jain as Akash Jain
- Arun Kalra as Maalik

== Critical reception and accolades ==
- "One of the best films of the Decade".- Anuj Malhotra
- 8 Indian Filmmakers Who Could Be Our Next Oscar Hope - INUTH
- One of eight Indian films at Tallinn Black Nights Festival.
- "That cascading onslaught of imagery may leave some viewers feeling washed out and exhausted, but others will find in this a thrilling, endlessly mutable tribute to one of the oldest, most vibrant parts of one of the world's great cities..." - Hollywood Reporter
- "Labour of Love" - The Week
- "Fusing documentary realism with magic realism, true events with fictionalized stories — the film is a eulogy to the syncretic culture of old Delhi and the cultural milieu that India represents by promoting tolerance and inclusiveness. A true masterpiece of contemporary Indian cinema. One of the very best from 2019". - KinoScope
- "In Shahjahanabad, a city within New Delhi, locals' own experiences make up a mass self-portrait directed by Anamika Haksar".- The Hollywood Reporter
- "Most Daring Indian Film" The Hindu
- "Never been a better cinematic ode to Old Delhi" - NDTV India
- "…a bold experiment and one necessary in times of manufactured Instagram films." - Cinestaan
- "Powerful and compelling human document." - The Hindu
- "Streets full of dreams" - Ahmedabad Mirror
- "The film follows an interesting structure that totally defies the conventional acts and arc of screenplay writing." - Film Companion
- The average cinema viewer subconsciously tries to find some kind of identification with the film he/she is watching as more often than not, this places them in a comfort zone to get lost in the film's narrative flow. But Anamika Haksar's striking directorial debut, after more than 40 years in theatre, at the relatively young age of 59, Ghode Ko Jalebi Khilane Le Jaa Riya Hoon, distances one from any kind of identification because it opens the underbelly of an old world you may have heard of, but not really experienced its intricacies in real life. - Upperstall
- "This film takes a lot of risks and pushes the frontiers of Indian cinema. Haksar has used animation and magic realism to tell a story that is humanist in intent, backed by years of research. It's wonderful that festivals are supporting such work, because this is not a film that would otherwise easily find a theatrical release," says Meenakshi Shedde, film curator and South-Asia consultant for the Berlin film festival." - Hindustan Times
- The title Ghode Ko Jalebi Khilane Le Ja Riya Hoon is an ode to the multiculturalism of the Walled City and a hat-tip to the humour woven in the way people converse. "The story of the title was narrated to me by an aunt, who would go to Purani Dilli to learn Hindustani classical music. Once she hailed a tonga and asked 'Arre bhaiya kahan jaa rahe ho (where are you going)?'. The Tonga wallah responded, 'Arre bibi, ghode ko jalebi khilane le ja riya hoon (I am taking the horse to eat jalebis)'. This was 35 years ago and this just stayed with me."
- Screened at MAMI 2018 under the India Story section
- Screened at the Dharamshala International Film Festival.
- Ghode Ko Jalebi Khilane Le Ja Riya Hoon (Taking The Horse To Eat Jalebis) by Anamika Haksar is delightfully droll even as it wend its way through the harsh, urgent questions of our time. - Anup Singh, IFFSA Ambassador Toronto
- Theatre doyenne Anamika Haksar's Ghode Ko Jalebi Khilane Le Ja Riya Hoon takes us on a trippy, exuberant, life-affirming journey through the underbelly of Shahjahanabad, a part of Delhi where street vendors, pickpockets, loaders, factory workers, rag-pickers and beggars live cheek-by-jowl as they seek to fight off the hardscrabble realities of poverty, oppression, and urban apathy. These are, however, phenomenally resilient people who haven't lost their enthusiasm for life. Each uncertain day is a struggle for survival, but they continue to cling to their dreams of a better life. Their flights of fancy keep them going. They negotiate the threats they face in surprisingly defiant, unflappable ways. Haksar mirrors the unpredictability of these lives in the structure and texture of her film, which combines documentary realism with flamboyant stylisation represented by animated passages and painted landscapes to create a kaleidoscopic but completely un-romanticized portrait of a people and their habitat. - NDTV.com
- Ghode Ko… marks the directorial debut of veteran theatre artiste Anamika Haksar and has been generating the right kind of festival buzz. - MAMI Reviews

== Film Reviews ==
- A perfect pastiche of realism and surrealism - Times of India
- The Dreams of an Underclass Which Remains Invisible Form the Nucleus of 'Ghode Ko Jalebi' - The Wire
- Not just a cool title, the film is a cinematic experience - Money Control
- There Has Never Been A Better Paean To Old Delhi - NDTV
- Beguiling - National Herald
- An intriguing tour of Shahjahanabad - Indian Express
- मौजूदा समय की एक महत्वपूर्ण इंडी-आर्टहाउस फ़िल्म. - The Lallantop
- दिल्ली की गलियों के जरिए लोगों की जिंदगी में झांकने वाली फिल्म - The Print (Hindi)
- Comic, surreal—‘Ghode Ko Jalebi Khilane Le Ja Riya Hoon’ is this year's Hindi cinematic marvel - The Print
- Of Dreams, Nightmares & Two Old Delhis in Theatre Veteran Anamika Haksar's Film - The Quint
- A Delite-ful Cinematic Phenomenon that Extends Beyond the Screen - Film Companion
- More experiential than impressionable - News9Live
- घोड़े को जलेबी खिलाने की सपनीली कोशिश - CineYatra
- Life In The Sweatcity - Techilive
- A surreal collection of fantasy, gritty realism, and bitter truth - Cinestaan
- ...Visually stunning and an enigmatic tour around Old Delhi. - Popcorn Reviewss

== Development and production ==
=== Film crew ===
Ghode Ko Jalebi Khilane Le Ja Riya Hoon is Haksar's first feature film. To finance it, she sold her Delhi house, borrowed from friends and family, launched a crowd-funding initiative online.

According to Haksar. "I took an eight-month course in film-making and I had the direction part under control. But I didn't know about things like lensing, or how to place the camera," she says. "There were political issues too. There was a woman on the streets. She had been raped 10 times. Where do you place your camera when you show her? Saumyananda Sahi, is a very conscious person. He prioritized her dignity over the idea of a good shot."

Gautam Nair, the sound designer, used ambient sound only; nothing was dubbed in a studio.

Archana Shastri, production designer of the film is also a well known painter from Baroda. Shastri based the art from folk tales and animation.

soumitra Ranadee, and his team of animators helped bring the fusion of paintings and animation together.

=== Film structure and characters ===
"The structure of the film mirrors the winding streets and lives of the homeless, who don't have a structured life and who don't know what will happen next." Haksar says she picked these characters because they are generally seen as types, or tasks, rather than individuals.

She created a list of about 25 questions — on fears, imagery, dreams, oft-felt emotions, attitude to money, daily routines. "I handed the questionnaire to a theatre colleague of mine who lives in old Delhi because it's better to do it that way than to just descend on people from the outside. We spoke to 75 people over two years," she says. Based on the answers to her questionnaire, she created her four key characters — a pickpocket, a snacks vendor a laborer-activist and a conductor of heritage walks..

Haksar also did a very small workshop for about 10 days. It played an important role for her to understand the different styles, since each actor is stylistically different. Ravindra Sahu, for instance, has done a lot of physical theater and has an intense, psychological interior. He has used movements and psychological gestures and movements in his performance as the pickpocket.

The film title came from Harksar's Aunt... She told her an anecdote about hailing a Tonga seller who had an emaciated horse. He refused to come, saying he had to feed his horse jalebis. Anamika loved the humour of it.

It took over seven years to make the film.

== Awards and nominations ==
- International Critics Jury Award - FIPRESCI (International Federation of Film Critics)
- Official Selection 2019 (Only Indian Film Selected) - Sundance's "New Frontier" Film Festival
- Best Script - Reaktor Indian Film Festival Vienna 2019
- Best Indian Cinema Award - BIFFES (Bengaluru International Film Festival 2019)
- Special Mention for Cinematography - IFFK (International Film Festival Of Kerela)
- Best Debut Director - IFFK (International Film Festival Of Kerela)
- Special Mention - IFFLA (Indian Film Festival Of Los Angeles)
- Rebels with a cause - Tallinn Black Nights Film Festival
- Official Selection New Views - Olhar de Cinema
- Official Selection - Melbourne International Film Festival
- Official Selection - MAMI (Mumbai Film Festival)
- Official Selection - Asian Film Festival, Barcelona
- Official Selection - IFFSA Toronto
- Official Selection - Kochi Muzhris Beinnale
- Official Selection - Toulouse Film Festival, France
- Official Selection - Dharamshala International Film Festival
- Official Selection - OTAWA Canadian Film Festival
- Official Selection - Ecoflanate Environmental Film Festival, Brazil
- Official Selection - International Film Festival, Melbourne
- Official Selection - International Film Festival, Madrid
- Special Mention - Kolkata Peoples Collective Special Invite
