= Shrimaan Shrimati (TV series) =

Indian Hindi-language sitcom

- Shrimaan Shrimati opening theme
- Genre: Sitcom
- Written by: Ashok Patole
- Directed by: Rajan Waghdhare
- Starring: Jatin Kanakia; Reema Lagoo; Rakesh Bedi; Archana Puran Singh
- Theme music composer: Ashok Patki
- Opening theme: "Shrimaanji Shrimatiji" by Vinod Rathod; Poornima (singer)
- Country of origin: India
- Original language: Hindi
- No. of seasons: 1
- No. of episodes: 143

Production
- Producers: Gautam Adhikari; Markand Adhikari
- Camera setup: Multi-camera
- Running time: 22 minutes
- Production company: Sri Adhikari Brothers Television Network

Original release
- Network: DD National
- Release: 1994 – 1997

Related
- Aaj Ke Shrimaan Shrimati; Shrimaan Shrimati Phir Se

Shrimaan Shrimati (transl. Mr. and Mrs.) is an Indian Hindi-language sitcom that aired on Doordarshan from 29 July 1994 to 1997. It starred Jatin Kanakia, Rakesh Bedi, Reema Lagoo and Archana Puran Singh. The show was created by Ashok Patole, directed by Rajan Waghdhare and produced by Gautam Adhikari and Markand Adhikari (popularly referred to as the "Adhikari brothers").

Shrimaan Shrimati was dubbed in Tamil as Thiruvallar Thirumathi. In 2015, a show named Bhabhi Ji Ghar Par Hai! which is based on this show started airing on &TV. A reboot series titled Shrimaan Shrimati Phir Se premiered on Sony SAB on 13 March 2018. Doordarshan re-telecast the series on DD National in month of April 2020, during COVID-19 lockdown in India.

== Plot ==
Shrimaan Shrimati was based on the premise of "love thy neighbor's wife". Keshav Kulkarni (Jatin Kanakia) is married to Kokila Kulkarni (Reema Lagoo). They are neighbours with popular film actress Prema Shalini (Archana Puran Singh) and her effeminate husband Dilruba Jarnail Singh Khurana (Rakesh Bedi). Keshav is attracted to Prema's glamour and pretentious lifestyle, while Dilruba is attracted to Kokila who is a smart elegant housewife and unpretentious. The husbands use every possible opportunity (and create many of their own) to seek the affections of the others' wives behind their own wives' backs. Often their efforts come to naught.

The other important characters in the TV series are Keshav and Kokila's son Ajay 'Chintu' (Ajay Nagrath), another neighbour Ganga (Hema Diwan), Keshav's boss Dayashankar (sometimes Bablu Prasad) Sharma (Shail Chaturvedi). Office co-worker Gokhale (Vijay Gokhale) is Keshav's frequent coconspirator---an aspiring actor, Gokhale often overdoes his performances in the many schemes he hatches for Keshav.

== Cast and characters ==
=== Main ===
- Jatin Kanakia as Keshav Kulkarni a.k.a. Keshu, Pappu or Keku. He is the central character in the serial. Keshav is dreadfully confrontational, remorselessly flirtatious and generally distrusting. Generally, he is very disapproving of the actions of his wife, his son, his neighbour Dilruba, his manager at work, and with other office employees. The only person Keshav seems to trust is his colleague and frequent co-conspirator, Gokhale. Most of the show's plots center around Keshav's escapades and its hilarious upheavals. Although he adores his wife and loves her, he is annoyingly faultfinding and taking dirty digs on her. Keshav engages in flirtatious inoffensive behaviour with his neighbour and film actor Prema Shalini, and craves her attention. He is also frequently seen flirting with Prema Shalini's friend and guest Sapna, his boss's niece, and other women in his office, as well as frequent loggerheads with his manager and his neighbour, Ganga.
- Reema Lagoo as Kokila Kulkarni a.k.a. Koki. She plays Keshav's wife. She is a smart homemaker and whose admirer is Dilruba Jarnail Singh Khurana. She is an intelligent lady who is frustrated with her husband's crush on other ladies specially their neighbour Prema Shalini.
- Archana Puran Singh as Prema Twins Shalini a.k.a. Doll or Prema ji. She plays a popular Bollywood film actress and speaks with an anglicised accent. Her name in the serial is a pun on real-life popular Bollywood actress Hema Malini. Mostly, she relishes the amorous attention from Keshav Kulkarni, but occasionally resents his dropping by unannounced at her home. Prema also contends with Keshav slipping into her film-making locations and interfering with the filmmakers.
- Rakesh Bedi as Dilruba Jarnail Singh Khurana a.k.a. Dilruba a.k.a. Dil. He plays Prema's submissive homemaker husband, and is rather effeminate by voice and body language. He has a huge crush on Koki
- Ajay Nagrath as Chintu, Keshav and Kokila's mischievous but adorable son. He has a tendency to deliberately and comically jumble up certain words. For instance, he addresses Dilruba as "Dil-bura uncle", which literally translated means "a person with ill will." Chintu always is seen to fail in his academics, and ends up getting it from Keshav most of the time.

=== Recurring ===
- Shail Chaturvedi as Mr. Bablu Prasad Sharma a.k.a. Mr. Sharma, is a director of a pharmaceutical company and Keshav & Gokhale's boss. Most of the time he thinks of Keshav and gokhale as a useless and incompetent employees, and often refers to Keshav as "luccha" (meaning "a cheat" in Hindi), namuna (meaning “specimen”) or "bhikmanga Kulkarni" (meaning "beggar") and the most popular one, "3rd class aadmi". Keshav and gokhale thinks of him as a nuisance and calls him "taklu Sharma" behind his back (meaning "bald" in Hindi, as Mr. Sharma is semi-bald). However while Sharma does seem to be at his wits end most of the time with Keshav and Gokhale's antics, there have been certain instances where he does have a soft spot for the duo.
- Hema Diwan as Ganga Mausi. She is a good friend of Koki and resides along with her husband Gangoba Tope (appeared only in one episode) in Gulmohar society. Ganga Mausi is the first person who provides any news or advice to Koki. Keshav, Gokhale and Chintu dislike Ganga Mausi. There is always an argument and verbal fight between Keshu and Ganga Mausi. She sometimes gives advices to Koki, which lead to a fight between Koki and Keshu. Dilruba calls her Ganges Mausi.
- Vijay Gokhale as Gokhale, Keshav's office colleague and best friend who helps Keshav in his schemes to impress women or in difficult situations but in some cases it backfires for both Keshav and Gokhale. He is best friend and sidekick of Keshav and his most trustworthy person who always help Keshav to get out of trouble. Keshav and Gokhale's comedy timing and chemistry are highlights of the serial.
- Neena Gupta as Sapna. She had entered the cast of the series, when Archana Puran Singh (Prema Shalini) had taken a sabbatical for her pregnancy. It was shown that Prema Shalini had gone to Hollywood for playing a role in Filmmaker Evan Eelberg's (reference to Steven Spielberg) movie Children's Park (reference to Jurassic Park). Neena Gupta was a part of approximately 22-23 episodes and was shown to be married when Archana Puran Singh resumed shooting. The makers of the show had very tactfully managed the entry and exit of her character.
- IBM Laxmi Her real name is not known. She is one of the office staff in the series. She is a South Indian, who does her house hold work such as vegetable cutting, during office hours. She also gossips with her other colleagues such Ms. Joshi and Mr. Bombaywala.
- Ms. Joshi. Her real name is not known. She is another office colleague of Keshav Kulkarni. She sits in the outer part of the office along with IBM Laxmi and Mr. Bombaywala. She always does make up while in office and gossips with her colleagues.
- Mr. Bombaywala. His real name is not known. He another colleague of Mr. Keshav Kulkarni. He always keeps interrupting conversations of his office staff and gossips with them.
- Baby Gazala Selmin as Pinky/Beggar child
- Sanchi Peswani as Soniya Verma a.k.a. Sonu/Sonu Baby - Sharma's Saali
- Vinay Yedekar as Captain Pushpakamal(Episode 81)
- Muni Jha as Koki's cousin/Dharmanand Nagar /Chaman, Keshav's friend who marries Sapna
- Sharad Vyas as various characters
- Anand Goradia as unfaithful husband of a woman.
- Tushar Dalvi as Prem Kumar.
- Kamlesh Oza as employee of Shrimati Shopping Center(Episode 58)
- Nilofar as Mrs. Mehta. She is one of the office staff in the series.
- Sweety Nayak as Maria. She is one of the office staff in the series.
- Deven Bhojani as Old Chintu
- Kishore Nandlaskar as Gangoba Tope
- Jaywant Wadkar as Raju Chilka
- Viju Khote as Sethia (Episode 17) Kala Kauwa (Episode 28)
- Kalpana Diwan as Keshav's Mama (mother) who stays in Amravati. Keshav's mama calls Keshav as 'Pappu'.
- Kuldeep Pawar as Producer Ghelaram
- Vijay Patkar as Makkhan Singh
- Nilesh Divekar as Random Goon
- Ravindra Berde as Kadakrao
- Avinash Kharshikar as Capt. Shuk
- Akhil Mishra as Fantoosh
- Shammi as Koki's mother

== Episodes ==
=== Episode 1 ===
Keshav Kulkarni and Kokila Kulkarni are married and live in Mumbai.

One night, Keshav dreams that he is travelling in a plane alongside a beautiful woman, but his dream is interrupted when Kokila wakes him up.

It turns out that it is their wedding anniversary. Keshav jokes about it, which makes Kokila upset. Later, Kokila plans a lunch and shopping trip, but Keshav is not very enthusiastic.

While getting ready, Kokila finds a ladies’ handkerchief in Keshav's pocket and becomes jealous and angry. However, it is later revealed that Chintu had put it there, and it actually belonged to their neighbour's daughter.

Meanwhile, Keshav learns that his neighbour Kutti is moving back to Madras. Soon after, word spreads that the famous actress Prema Shalini is moving into that house. When people come to look at the flat, Chintu throws tantrums and tricks the realtor into believing he is Prema's son, managing to get chocolates from him. Finally, Prema and Dilruba move into the flat.

== Sequel and reboot ==
A sequel series Aaj Ke Shrimaan Shrimati based on same concept but with a new cast and characters aired on SAB TV in 2005.

&TV show Bhabiji Ghar Par Hain! is noted to have been inspired by Shrimaan Shrimati.

A reboot series Shrimaan Shrimati Phir Se premiered on SAB TV in 2018.

== See also ==
- List of Hindi comedy shows
- List of programs broadcast by DD National
