= Maayke Se Bandhi Dor =

- Also known as: Dor
- Created by: UTV Software Communications
- Written by: Rajesh Patel; Zarina Mehta
- Directed by: Rajesh Patel
- Starring: See Below
- Opening theme: Maayke Se Bandhi Dor
- Country of origin: India
- Original language: Hindi
- No. of episodes: 170

Production
- Producer: Zarina Mehta
- Running time: 24 minutes
- Production company: UTV Software Communications

Original release
- Network: STAR Plus
- Release: 14 February – 2 October 2011

Related
- Kolangal

Maayke Se Bandhi Dor is a soap opera that aired on Star Plus. It is a remake of the Sun TV Tamil serial Kolangal. The show ran from 14 February 2011 to 2 October 2011. The show was also broadcast on a television channel in Afghanistan called Ariana TV.

== Plot ==
Set against a Marathi backdrop, Mayake Se Bandhi Dor is a tale about Avani, a young woman struggling against the social conventions that affect women in India. The show focuses on the themes of a woman's powers of forgiveness and pliability.

Avani is the sole bread-winner of her family and must support her mother, her brother, and her two sisters. Her mother is desperate to get her married but Avani has other plans. She wants to find homes and happiness for her brother and her two sisters first. At her mother's insistence, Avani finally agrees to give marriage a chance, but only on two conditions. The first condition is that she be able to continue to work after the marriage. The second condition is that she be able to continue to provide her salary to her family.

Avani meets Bhaskar who accepts her conditions and they agree to marry. The festivities begin but Bhaskar and his family have ulterior motives. They want to be the beneficiaries of Avani’s high salary and her affluent relatives, Kaka and Boss. Later, Bhaskar relents and asks Avani for forgiveness. Avani forgives him and they restart their relationship. Bhaskar's mother, Aii still hates Avani, however, because she thinks that Avani is stealing her son away from her. Then Avani sees her father alive, and Lata finds out that Aditi is gone so Avani and Bhaskar go to her house. Kartik and Abha marry. In the end, Avani forgives her father and Kaveri.

Maayke Se Bandhi Dor ended on 2 October 2011, having aired 170 episodes.

== Cast ==
=== Main ===
- Shweta Munshi as Avani
- Rohit Khurana as Bhaskhar

=== Additional ===
- Bharat Chawda as Muksaare
- Krutika Gaikwad as Aditi
- Ankur Moondhra as Rajesh
- Uvara Patil as Nit
- Bhuvnesh Mann as Karthik
- Aishwarya Narkar as Kaveri
- Rohini Hattangadi as Lata
- Anjan Srivastava as Mangesh
- Anand Goradia as Prabhu
- Riya Patil as Kid Avani
- Damini Joshi as Usha
- Vaishnavvi shukla as Aditi daughter

=== Guest appearance ===
- Pooja Gor as Pratigya from Mann Ki Awaaz Pratigya

== Production ==
The production of the series began in August 2010. Initially supposed to premiere on an afternoon slot in December 2010. But, the CEO of UTV Santosh Nair wanted a prime slot which was not vacant then. Thus they waited for it and it premiered on 14 February 2011.

The series is based on the backdrop of Maharashtra.

== Reception ==
Maayke Se Bandhi Dor is India's first television series filmed in a HD format for StarPlus.

The Indian Express rated two and half stars and said, "Shweta Munshi as Avni is a decent actress and so is Rohit Khurana who plays her fiancé. Rohini Hattangady as the Shashikala-meets-Lalita-Pawar mother-in-law digs deep into her saas role while Anjan Srivastav as the meek father is endearing and we want to shake up Aishwarya Narkar, the helpless ladki ki maa. The person who gets our goat is Aanand Goradia as the son-in-law, he goes absolutely OTT and speaks in a weird Maharashtrian accent."

The series since its inception could not garner good expected ratings. The wedding sequence of the leads garnered an average rating of 1.62 TVR. In third week of September 2011 it garnered 1.6 TVR.
