= Ghar Jamai (TV series) =

Indian television series

- Genre: Sitcom
- Written by: Ranjan Bose; Subash Kabra; Anant Mahadevan
- Directed by: Anant Mahadevan
- Starring: Satish Shah; R. Madhavan; Mandira Bedi
- Country of origin: India
- Original language: Hindi
- No. of seasons: 1

Production
- Producer: Dinesh Bansal
- Cinematography: M. Bellare
- Editors: Suhail Sayed; Altaf Sheikh
- Camera setup: Multi-camera
- Running time: 23 minutes
- Production company: Meteor Films

Original release
- Network: Zee TV
- Release: 29 June 1997 – 1998

Ghar Jamai is an Indian comedy television series which premiered on Zee TV in 1997. The series was produced by Meteor Films and starred Satish Shah, R. Madhavan, and Mandira Bedi.

== Cast ==
=== Main ===
- R. Madhavan as Malayatoor Subramaniam Namboodiripad (Subbu)
- Satish Shah as Vishamber Mehra
- Mandira Bedi as Chandni
- Sadhana Singh as Paghwan/Prakash Kaur/Parkash beebi
- Asrani as Doctor Masani
- Gracy Singh / Vipra Rawal as Chandni's sister
- Anand Goradia as Chandni's brother
- Sunil Jetly as cook

=== Guest ===
- Viju Khote as Muthuswamy
- Varsha Usgaonkar as Miss Chamcham
- Gajendra Chauhan as Sidhu Singh
- K.D.Chandran as Subramanium/Subbu Father
- Ashwini Kalsekar as Rohiniamma
- Atul Parchure as Police Constable Ghorpade
- Hemant Pandey as Police Inspector Faterfaker
- Surbhi Tiwari as College Student
- Ashiesh Roy as Girdhari
- Satyen Kappu as Chandni Grandfather
- Suchitra Pillai as Subbulakshmi
- Shrivallabh Vyas as Kidnapper Subhash Singh(Subbu)/ Gajraj Singh (Guest role in two episodes)
- Murali Sharma as Doctor Salim
- Javed Khan Amrohi as Hotel Receptionist
- Daya Shankar Pandey as Hotel Union Leader/ Robert (Guest role in two Episodes)
- Shehzad Khan as Bus Driver/ KK Don (Guest role in two episodes)
- Ajay Nagrath as Subbu and Chandni Son
- Kavi Kumar Azad as Judge in Food Competition
- Kuljeet Randhawa as Subramanium/Subbu friend
- Rajesh Puri as Pradeep Bhagwadewala
- Dinyar Contractor as Dr. Masani

== Feature film ==
In September 2011, Ananth Mahadevan announced plans of making a feature film inspired by the series with Madhavan in the lead role, and also titled the project as Ghar Jamai. Despite plans to shoot the film in Toronto during 2012, the idea did not develop into production.
