= Bharat Aala Parat =

- Theatrical release poster
- Directed by: Vijay Gokhale
- Written by: Anand Mhaswekar
- Produced by: Krishnanand
- Starring: Bharat Jadhav; Surekha Kudachi; Vijay Chavan; Ramesh Bhatkar
- Cinematography: Sameer Athalye
- Edited by: Vijay Khochikar
- Music by: Dnyanesh Kumar
- Production company: Aadi Invents
- Distributed by: Everest Entertainment
- Release date: 23 October 2007
- Running time: 122 minutes
- Country: India
- Language: Marathi

Bharat Aala Parat (transl. Bharat is Returned) is a 2007 Indian Marathi-language comedy film directed by Vijay Gokhale and produced by Krishnanand under the banner of Aadi Invents. The film starring Bharat Jadhav, Surekha Kudachi, Vijay Chavan, Ramesh Bhatkar, and Gauri Sarawate. The film depicts the relationship between an uncle and his nephew and the extent the nephew would go to in order to correct his uncle. Because of its storyline and Bhatkar's outstanding performance, the film is still regarded as one of the best in Marathi cinema.

== Plot ==
Renowned social worker and hospital trustee MLA Babasaheb Ghatpande harbors a hidden hunger for power and wealth. When Dr. Bharat, his nephew, joins the hospital, he discovers that things are not as they seem. Bharat makes the decision to impart a lifelong lesson to his uncle.

== Cast ==
- Bharat Jadhav as Dr. Bharat
- Surekha Kudachi
- Vijay Chavan
- Ramesh Bhatkar
- Gauri Sarawate
- Vijay Gokhale
- Anshuman Vichare
- Aasha Sathe
- Vinay Yedekar
- Kanchan Pagare
- Kunal Limaye
- Aishwarya Reddy
- Priti Joshi
- Ajita Kulkarni

== Production ==
=== Filming locations ===
- Buller House (Mumbai)
- Mysore Association Hall
- Ayurveda Seva Sangh Hospital
- Panchavati
- Yashwantrao Chavan Open University Nashik
- Narayan Chavere (Chavere Chal)

== Release ==
=== Theatrical ===
The film was released on 23 October 2007.

=== Home media ===
The film available for streaming on Amazon Prime Video.

== Reception ==
The Times of India listed the film to the best films of Ramesh Bhatkar. On the poll lists website Ranker, the film ranked 13th best Movie of Bharat Jadhav, based on 100 voters.

== Soundtrack ==
Bharat Aala Parat

Soundtrack album by Dnyanesh Kumar
- Released: 2008
- Genre: Feature film soundtrack
- Length: 9:37
- Language: Marathi
- Label: Everest Entertainment LLP

The music is composed by Dnyanesh Kumar and the songs are sung by Swapnil Bandodkar, Vaishali Samant, Madhav Bhagwat under the lebal Everest Entertainment.

All music is composed by Dnyanesh Kumar

Track listing
No.	Title	Singer (s)	Length
1.	"Bharat Aala Parat"	Swapnil Bandodkar	4:04
2.	"Main Nashli Naar"	Vaishali Samant, Madhav Bhagwat	5:33
Total length:			9:37
