= Club 60 =

2013 film directed by Sanjay Tripathi

- Promotional poster
- Directed by: Sanjay Tripathy
- Written by: Sanjay Tripathy
- Produced by: Kavee Kumar Vineet Yadav
- Starring: Farooq Sheikh; Sarika Thakur; Satish Shah; Raghubir Yadav
- Cinematography: Shyamanand Jha
- Edited by: Arunabha Mukherjee
- Music by: Songs: Pranit Gedham; Background Score: Sanjoy Chowdhury
- Release date: December 6, 2013 (India)
- Country: India
- Language: Hindi
- Budget: Rs. 60 million

Club 60 is a 2013 Indian comedy drama film produced by Kavee Kumar under the Pulse Media banner and is directed by Sanjay Tripathi. The film features Farooq Sheikh, Sarika Thakur, Raghubir Yadav and Satish Shah in key roles. The film was Farooq Sheikh's last release before his death on 28 December 2013.

== Plot ==
After the untimely death of their only son, Iqbaal (Ankit Bathla), neurosurgeon, Dr Tariq Sheikh (Farooq Sheikh) and his wife Dr Saira (Sarika) are unable to put the pieces of their broken life together. Tariq has depression, while Saira struggles to cope with her husband's suicidal tendencies. In an attempt to make a fresh start in life and to get rid of the 'nothingness' that haunts them, they shift to Mumbai from Pune. More than the city's distractions, it is their loud neighbor Manubhai (Raghubir Yadav), who manages to kill the deafening silence that plagues them with his somewhat annoying yet adorable antics. Manubhai introduces Tariq to the jovial members of Club 60 – where life begins at 60.

== Cast ==
- Farooq Shaikh as Dr. Tariq Shaikh
- Sarika Thakur as Dr. Saira Shaikh, Dr. Tariq's wife
- Ankit Bathla as Iqbaal Shaikh, Dr. Tariq's son
- Raghubir Yadav as Manubhai Shah
- Satish Shah as Jay Mansukhani
- Tinnu Anand as Ali Zafar aka Jaffar Bhai
- Sharat Saxena as Commissioner G.S. Dhillon
- Vineet Kumar as S. K. Sinha
- Suhasini Mulay as Sarita Mansukhani, Jay Mansukhani’s wife
- Viju Khote as Secretary Patil
- Zarina Wahab as Sharda Sinha, S. K. Sinha’s wife
- Himani Shivpuri as Nalini Doctor
- Harsh Chhaya as Dr. Anand
- Mona Wasu as Dolly, the lady at night club
- Geeta Bisht as Rosetta, nurse
- Shahabb Khan as Clerk
- Mansi Sadana as Junior Doctor
- Jaanvi Sangwan as Maya
- Satish Sharma as Rohit Mansukhani, Jay Mansukhani’s son
- Jitendra Trehan as Girish Mirchandani, Rohit’s father in law
- Ruma Rajni as Surabhi Mansukhani (Nee Mirchandani), Jay Mansukhani’s daughter in law
- Master Meet as Yash Mansukhani, Rohit’s son
- Khushi Awasthi as Kuku Patel
- Alok Chaturvedi as Pandey
- Umakant Rai as Gopal
- Suresh Naik as Sampat
- Amod as Club Manager
- Beena Kalekar as Club Receptionist

== Soundtrack ==
Track listing
No.	Title	Singer(s)	Length
1.	"Rooh Mein "	Raju Singh	5:35

== Reception ==
The movie was generally appreciated for its script, casting, performances by the lead actors (Farooq Sheikh and Sarika), editing and the music. At the same time, the movie was found wanting in certain aspects such as the background score, screenplay and was also criticized for some of the jokes with heavy sexual innuendo, a predictable second half and a clumsy and overlong climax. Overall, the movie received an average rating of 2.58/5 from critics.

=== Box office ===
As per Bollywood Hungama website, the lifetime collections of the film was Rs. 4.2 million.

== Re-release ==
PVR Cinemas decided to re-release Club 60 in cinemas again in January 2014 as a tribute to Farooq Sheikh .
