= Vijay Gokhale =

Indian actor

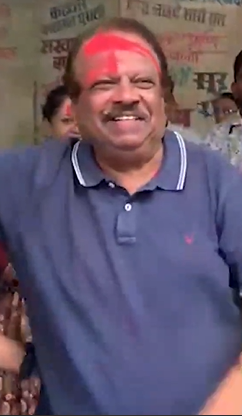
- Vijay Gokhale in 2023
- Born: Vijay; 14 June 1962 (age 64)
- Occupations: Actor; Director
- Children: Ashutosh Gokhale

Vijay Gokhale is an Indian Marathi and Hindi film and television actor and director. In 1995 he acted in the television series Shrimaan Shrimati.

== Filmography ==
=== Director ===
- Dum Asel Tar (2012)
- Bharat Aala Parat (2007)

=== Actor ===
- Hi Mummy Hi Daddy
- Dum Asel Tar
- Parambi
- Mamachya Rashila Bhacha
- Tata Birla Ani Laila
- Asami Kay Gunha Kela
- Bhagam Bhag
- Chala Khel Khelu Ya Doghe
- Saline Kela Ghotala
- Zhak Marali Bayko Keli
- Bharat Aala Parat
- Mumbaicha Dabewala
- Baba Lagin
- Mahercha Nirop
- Hi Poragi Konachi
- Polisachi Bayko
- Gharandaaj
- Sar Kas Shant Shant
- Ek Unaad Divas

== Television ==
- Shrimaan Shrimati (1995-1999)
- Hum Aapke Hai Woh (1996-1998)
- Ghar Jamai (1997)
- Family No.1 (1998)
- Dil Vil Pyar Vyar (1998-1999)
- C.I.D. (2002)
- Hum Sab Ek Hain (1999-2000)
- Saat Phero Ki Hera Pherie
- Tula Shikvin Changlach Dhada (2023-2025)
- Kamli (2025–present)
