= Kakaji Kahin =

- Based on: Netaji Kahin by Manohar Shyam Joshi
- Directed by: Basu Chatterjee
- Starring: Om Puri; Shail Chaturvedi
- Original language: Hindi

Original release
- Network: DD National
- Release: 1988

Kakaji Kahin is an Indian political satire that aired on Doordarshan in 1988. It was one of Basu Chatterjee's acclaimed works for Indian television, based on a book called Netaji Kahin by well-known author Manohar Shyam Joshi.

Actor Om Puri played the title role of Kakaji with a supporting cast of Shail Chaturvedi and Alok Nath.

== Cast ==
- Om Puri as Kakaji
- Shail Chaturvedi as Netaji
