= Humrahi =

- Written by: Manohar Shyam Joshi
- Directed by: Kunwar Sinha
- Starring: See below
- Opening theme: "Yahin kahin par hai, teri meri manzil"
- Original language: Hindi

Original release
- Network: DD National

Humrahi is an Indian social drama series broadcast on Doordarshan network in 1993. It was written by Manohar Shyam Joshi and directed by Kunwar Sinha.

The series showed a family dealing with problems within their home and society. Himani Shivpuri made her debut in the negative role of Devaki Bhaujai (or Bhojai, another word for Bhabhi) and her character was very popular. The show had an ensemble cast including Sadiya Siddiqui, Anang Desai, Gopi Desai, Mohan Bhandari and others.

== Cast ==
- Himani Shivpuri as Devaki Bhaujai
- Sadiya Siddiqui as Angoori
- Varun Gautam as Gyarsa
- Anang Desai as Lofad Kumar
- Gopi Desai
- Mohan Bhandari
