= Shweta Munshi =

Indian television actress

- Born: Indore, India
- Occupation: Actress
- Years active: 2008–present

Shweta Munshi is an Indian television actress. She made her debut as a lead actress in the TV series Kyunki Jeena Isse Ka Naam Hai which was aired on Doordarshan. She became popular for her role as the protagonist Avani Patil in Maayke Se Bandhi Dor, which was aired on Star Plus. She portrayed the role of Arpita in the most famous Zee TV show, Punar Vivah. She made a brief appearance in the Zee TV show Bandhan as Aditya Redij’s wife Prabha.

== Early life ==
Shweta Munshi was born in Indore, Madhya Pradesh. She completed her high school education and got her Engineering degree in computer science from Indore. During her graduation she started learning Bharatnatyam, and doing theatre. She later moved to Mumbai in 2006 and joined the Roshan Taneja School of Acting for a Diploma course.

== Career ==
Shweta Munshi began her acting career professionally in 2008, with a show that was aired on Doordarshan Kyunki Jeena Issi Ka Naam Hai. She then appeared on the TV show Maayke Se Bandhi Dor on Star Plus. She played a special cameo in Zee TV's popular show Punar Vivah. She was also seen in the episodic series in Fear Files. She briefly appeared in Zee TV's show Bandhan as Prabha Karnik. Currently, Shweta is seen in many Brand Advertisements and TV Commercials such as Samsung Bixby, Horlicks, Vim Bar, Amazon Grocery, etc.

== Television ==
Year	Title	Role	Notes	Ref.
2008	Kyunki... Jeena Isi Ka Naam Hai	Savita		
2011	Maayke Se Bandhi Dor	Avani		
2012	Punar Vivaah – Zindagi Milegi Dobara	Arpita Yash Scindia		
2014	Bandhan	Prabha Mahesh Karnik		
2022	Swaraj	Bhikaiji Cama		
2025	Dhaakad Beera	Sushila Chaudhary		
