= Yeh Khula Aasmaan =

- Theatrical release poster
- Directed by: Gitanjali Sinha
- Written by: Gitanjali Sinha & Samarth Lahri
- Produced by: Hemendra Aran
- Starring: Raghubir Yadav; Yashpal_Sharma; Raj Tandon; Anya Anand; Manjusha Godse; Kishor Nadalskar; Nitin Kerur; Aditya Siddhu; Gulshan Pandey
- Music by: Anand Milind
- Release date: 25 May 2012

Yeh Khula Aasmaan (transl. This open sky) is a 2012 Hindi-language film, directed by Gitanjali Sinha and produced by Hemendra Aran of Gitanjali Creations. The film stars Raghubir Yadav, Yashpal Sharma, Raj Tandon and Anya Anand. Anand–Milind composed the music for the film.

== Cast ==
- Raghubir Yadav
- Yashpal Sharma
- Raj Tandon
- Anya Anand
- Manjusha Godse
- Kishor Nadalskar
- Nitin Kerur
- Aditya Siddhu
- Gulshan Pandey
