= Family No.1 (TV series) =

Indian sitcom series

- Genre: Comedy
- Starring: See below
- Country of origin: India
- Original language: Hindi

Original release
- Network: Sony Entertainment Television
- Release: 1998 – 1999

Family No. 1 is an Indian comedy television series which aired on Sony Entertainment Television from 1998 to 1999, starring Kanwaljeet Singh and Tanvi Azmi.

== Synopsis ==
The show had two single parents, with three kids each, who end up having to share a newly rented house. Over time, both families go through a series of comic situations and a coming of age of the similarly aged children as they strike friendships and become closer.

A divorcee, Deepak Malhotra and his three kids - Rahul, Rashmi and Guddu live in a beach house which they share with another family the Potia family. The Potia family consists of divorcee Shalini Potia and her three children - Bharti, Toofaan and Dheer.

The story revolves around the two families adjusting and fighting while sharing the same home.

== Cast ==
=== Main ===
- Kanwaljeet Singh as Deepak Malhotra
- Tanvi Azmi as Shalini Potia
- Asawari Joshi as Shalini Potia, replaced Tanvi Azmi
- Kabir Sadanand as Rahul Malhotra
- Aparna Tilak as Rashmi Malhotra
- Vishal Solanki as Guddu
- Umesh Pherwani as Dheer Potia
- Ajay Nagrath as Toofaan Potia
- Niyati Rajwade as Bharti Potia

=== Recurring ===
- Shekhar Shukla as Ramniklal Patel/Patel Uncle
- Rajinder Mehra as School Principal
- Rajesh Puri as Jaani Bhai, Estate Agent
- Shagufta Ali as Jassi, School Principal Wife
- Vishal Kotian as Mohit, Rashmi's husband

=== Guest ===
- Sulekha Talwalkar as Sheeba
- Vijay Gokhale as Bholaram
- Rajendra Chawla as Prakash
- Kunika as Shalini
- Viju Khote as Aditya Kapoor
- Ragesh Asthana as Amit Roy
- Daya Shankar Pandey as Pandey
- Gautami Kapoor as Priya, Shalini Younger sister
- Yash Tonk as Raj, Priya friend
