= Shrimaan Shrimati Phir Se =

Television series

- Genre: Sitcom
- Directed by: Rajan Waghdhare; Amit Damle
- Creative director: Ravi Gautam Adhikari
- Starring: See below
- Theme music composer: Abhijeet Hegdepatil
- Opening theme: Shrimaan ji Haa ji Shrimati ji
- Composers: Manas-Shikhar, Anuj
- Country of origin: India
- Original language: Hindi
- No. of seasons: 1
- No. of episodes: 80

Production
- Cinematography: Ajay Gupta
- Running time: 21 minutes
- Production company: Happii Digital

Original release
- Network: Sony SAB
- Release: 13 March – 2 July 2018

Related
- Shrimaan Shrimati

Shrimaan Shrimati Phir Se (transl. Mr. and Mrs. again) is an Indian Sitcom which premiered on 13 March 2018 on SAB TV. This series is a reboot of Shrimaan Shrimati which was broadcast on DD National.

== Premise ==
Two neighbors constantly try to impress each other's wives.

== Cast ==
=== Main ===
- Sameer Shah as Keshav Kulkarni
  - Prasad Barve replaced Shah in April 2018.
- Sucheta Khanna as Kokila Kulkarni
- Suresh Menon as Dilruba Jarnail Singh Khurana
- Barkha Sengupta as Prema Shalini

=== Recurring ===
- Shivlekh Singh as Chintu, Keshav and Kokila's son
- Jalak Motiwala as Gokhale, Keshav's friend
- Hitesh Dave as Mr. Bablu Prasad Sharma, Keshav and Gokhale's boss
- Divya Bhatnagar as Pinky, Kokila's good friend
- Shyn Khurana as Sonia
- Shyam Mashalkar as Toto, the Director of Prema's film
- Abraam Pandey as Parminder, superstar and Prema's co-actor
- Rinku Singh Nikumbh as Mrs. Pandey, a woman who works in Keshav's office
- Meiron Damania as Mr. Bombaywala, A man who works in Keshav's office
- Rishima Sidhu as Vijay Laxmi, A women who works in Keshav's Office.
- Jaspal Sandhu as Mr. Dalal

== Reception ==
Gursimran Kaur Banga of The Times of India called the show "outdated." She further wrote, "Based on the concept of 'Love thy neighbour's wife', Shrimaan Shrimati Phir Se fails to create the same magic that it did in the original version. It makes for an average watch." Urmila of Femina praises the performances of Barkha Bisht, Sucheta Khanna, Suresh Menon and Sameer Shah but criticised the plot, writing, "Till now this serial has not made much impact. Its performance can only be called average. To some extent, its main characters have succeeded in trying to handle the poor plot and story line."

== See also ==
- List of Hindi comedy shows
