= Amaravati Kathalu =

1975–1977 Telugu anthology of short stories by Satyam Sankaramanchi

- Author: Satyam Sankaramanchi
- Illustrator: Bapu
- Cover artist: Bapu
- Language: Telugu
- Genre: Fiction
- Publisher: Navodaya Publishers, Vijayawada
- Publication date: 1975–1977
- Publication place: India
- Media type: Print (Paperback)
- Pages: 399

Amaravati Kathalu is a collection of Telugu short stories written by Satyam Sankaramanchi. The anthology, comprising 100 stories, revolves around the village of Amaravati and its people. These stories were first serialized in the Andhra Jyothi weekly magazine between 1975 and 1977 and were later compiled into a book by Navodaya Publishers, featuring illustrations by the renowned artist Bapu. Widely regarded as a landmark in Telugu literature, the collection has been reprinted multiple times.

The stories in Amaravati Kathalu are inspired by incidents and folklore associated with Amaravati. They follow a Chekhovian style, focusing on the everyday lives of the villagers and offering heartwarming narratives. Each story is accompanied by a simple yet evocative illustration by Bapu, enhancing the book's appeal. The foreword for the collection was written by Mullapudi Venkata Ramana. The stories were dictated by Sankaramanchi to All India Radio newsreader Prayaga Ramakrishna, who transcribed them.

The collection won the Andhra Sahitya Academy Award in 1979 and is regarded as one of the finest Telugu short story collections of the 20th century. It has been praised for its imaginative storytelling and depiction of rural life. A television series based on the stories, titled Amaravati Ki Kathayein (1995), was directed by Shyam Benegal.

== List of stories ==
- Varada (వరద)
- Sudi Gundam lo Mukku Pudaka (సుడిగుండం లో ముక్కుపుడక)
- Punkula Butta lo Lacchi Thalli (పుణుకుల బుట్టలో లచ్చి తల్లి)
- Rendu Gangalu (రెండు గంగలు)
- Bangaru Donga (బంగారు దొంగ)
- Mukkoti Kailasam (ముక్కోటి కైలాసం)
- Aaresina Cheera (ఆరేసిన చీర)
- Sivudu Navvadu (శివుడు నవ్వాడు)
- Oka Rojellipoyindi (ఒక రోజెల్లిపోయింది)
- Hara Hara Mahadeva (హరహర మహాదేవ)
- Dhavali Chirigi Poyindi
- Raagi Chemubulo Chepa Pilla (రాగిచెంబులో చేప పిల్ల)
- Adgagigo Bassu (అద్గదిగో బస్సు)
- Puvvulleni Vigrahalu Navvayi (పువ్వుల్లేని విగ్రహాలు నవ్వాయి)
- Pandiri Patte-mancham (పందిరి పట్టెమంచం)
- Annapurna Kavidi (అన్నపూర్ణ కావిడి)
- Chettu Kommanunna Katha (చెట్టుకొమ్మనున్న కథ)
- Aakhari Venkatadri Naidu (ఆఖరి వెంకటాద్రి నాయుడు)
- Evaru Paadina Aa Edaksharale (ఎవరు పాడినా ఆ ఏడక్షరాలే)
- Paccha Gaddi Bhaggumandhi (పచ్చగడ్డి భగ్గుమంది)
- Lega Dooda Chaduvu (లేగదూడ చదువు)
- Avathaloddu Pongindi (అవతలొడ్డు పొంగింది)
- Me Me Meka Pilla (మే మే మేక పిల్ల)
- Kakitho Kaburu (కాకితో కబురు)
- Thulasi Thambulam (తులసి తాంబూలం)
- Bhojana Chakravarthi (భోజన చక్రవర్తి)
- Navellipoyindi (నావెళ్ళి పోయింది)
- Neeru Nilavadu (నీరు నిలవదు)
- Engila
- Baki Sangathi (బాకీ సంగతి)
- Maya (మాయ)
- Nivedana (నివేదన)
- Dharma Paludu (ధర్మపాలుడు)
- Nanna-Nadi (నాన్న-నది)
- Keelu Gurram (కీలుగుర్రం)
- Acchosina Ambothu (అచ్చోసిన ఆంబోతు)
- Vasocchindi (వయసొచ్చింది)
- Lankalla Puttindi Lacchi Thalli (లంకల్ల పుట్టింది లచ్చితల్లి)
- Iddaru Mitrulu (ఇద్దరు మిత్రులు)
- Punnaga Vaana (పున్నాగ వాన)
- Khaali Khurchi (ఖాళీ కుర్చీ)
- RajaHamsa Rekkalu Vippindi (రాజహంస రెక్కలు విప్పింది)
- Evara Poyedhi? (ఎవరా పోయేది?)
- Muddulalludu (ముద్దులల్లుడు)
- Muddelanayya-Manasu Needaiyunda (ముద్దేలనయ్యా మనసు నీదైయుండ)
- Vamsaankuram (వంశాంకురం)
- Bali (బలి)
- Atununchi Kottukurandi (అటునుంచి కొట్టుకురండి!)
- Manasu Nindukundi
- Abaddham-Chedina Aadadhi
- Dongalo? Doralo?
- Kaanuka (కానుక)
- Thalli Kadupu Challaga (తల్లి కడుపు చల్లగా..)
- Virigina Pallaki (విరిగిన పల్లకి)
- Naa Venaka Evaro (నా వెనక ఎవరో)
- Siri-Shanti (సిరి-శాంతి)
- Gunde Sivudikichuko (గుండె శివుడికిచ్చుకో)
- Sangamam
- Antha Saamidhe. Nenaverni Ivvadaniki?
- Malli Malli Cheppukune Katha
- Ampakam
- Nindukunda Bomma
- Gaythri
- Mouna Sankham
- Adugo Alladugo
- Appadala Assembly
- Matti..Otti Matti..
- Velam Saruku
- Nilabadagalava
- Saakshatkaram
- Evariki Cheppamaka
- Gnana Kshetram
- Eka Kathapithamaha
- Trupthi
- Aagni Uyyala
- Tellavarindhi
- Tampulamari Somalingam
- Edadiko Roju Puli
- Dooranga Saarangadhara
- Amavasya Veligindi
- Tha, Thi, Tho, Na (త, థి, థో, న)
- Sthambhana
- Pattuthareeyam
- Mrythyorma
- Antha Baagane Undi
- Deepam-Jyothi
- Kuputhro Jaayetha Kvachadapi Kumatha Nabhavathi
- Poola Sultan
- Pakka Veedhi Jnmantha Dooram
- Tapa Raledu Bottu Cheragaledu
- Bhojananthe
- O Naruda! Vaanaruda
- Bindu Rekha
- Nenu Melkone Unnanu
- Eduperaganivadu
- Arugarugo Subbayya Maastaru
- Pranava Murthy
- Seetharamabhyam Namaha
- Sikharam (శిఖరం)
- Maha Rudrabhishekam (మహా రుద్రాభిషేకం)
