= Amaravati ki Kathayein =

Indian Television Series

- Genre: Anthology
- Based on: "Amaravati Kathalu" by Satyam Sankaramanchi
- Written by: Satyam Sankaramanchi
- Directed by: Shyam Benegal
- Starring: See below
- Original language: Hindi
- No. of seasons: 1
- No. of episodes: 13

Production
- Producer: Venugopal K Thakker
- Running time: 22½ minutes

Original release
- Network: DD National
- Release: 29 May – 29 August 1995

Amravati Ki Kathayein is an Indian anthology TV series, based on the Telugu short story collection "Amaravati Kathalu" by Satyam Sankaramanchi. It was produced by Venugopal K Thakker (Provideo) and directed by Shyam Benegal and aired on the main channel of Indian National Broadcaster Doordarshan. It originally was telecast every Monday from 29 May to 29 August 1995 with a total of 13 episodes. The series had a second run in 2005.

The stories were based in village of Amaravati, in the state of Andhra Pradesh. It depicted snippets from daily life of the people of the village. In a review, Sheila Vajpayee of Indian Express wrote, "Amaravati Ki Kathayein is a rebuke to all of us who consistently complain that television and quality are irreconcilable enemies." Writing for The Times of India, Iqbal Masood called the series "path breaking" and urged Doordarshan "to make its channels more decent and civilized with series like Amaravati Ki Kathayein". The episodes are about 22½ minutes long.

== Cast ==
- Virendra Saxena
- Mohan Gokhale
- Ayesha Jalil
- Sulbha Arya
- Ashok Kumar
- Raghubir Yadav
- Neena Gupta
- Ravi Jhankal
- Pallavi Joshi
- Lalit Mohan Tiwari
- Suma Kanakala
- Shrivallabh Vyas
- Rakesh Srivastav
