= Ajay Nagrath =

Indian actor

- Nagrath in 2013
- Born: 16 February 1986 (age 40); Mumbai, Maharashtra, India
- Occupation: Actor
- Years active: 1994–present
- Known for: C.I.D. Shrimaan Shrimati
- Spouse: Bhoomi Nagrath
- Father: Anil Nagrath

Ajay Nagrath (born 16 February 1986) is an Indian television and movie actor and is the son of Bollywood actor Anil Nagrath. He is best known for playing the role of Inspector Pankaj in C.I.D. and Chintu in Shriman Shrimati.

== Filmography ==
=== Film ===
Year	Film	Role
1994	Kanoon	Judge's grandson Ravi
1995	God and Gun	Master Ajay Nagrath
1997	Pardes	Dabboo
2002	Yeh Hai Jalwa	Bunty Mittal
2003	Ek Aur Ek Gyarah	Ram Singh's son
2010	Milenge Milenge	Tanker

=== Television ===
Year	Show	Role	Notes
1994–1999	Shriman Shrimati	Chintu	Child artist
1997	Ghar Jamai	Subbu and Chandni son	Child artist
1998–1999	Family No.1	Toofan	Child artist
2000	Shaka Laka Boom Boom	Chandu	DD1
2000-2005	Fox Kids	Filmy Funda	
2007	Biggest Loser Jeetega	Contestant	
2012–2018; 2024–2025	C.I.D.	Sub-Inspector Pankaj	Supporting role
2021–2023	Bade Achhe Lagte Hain 2	Aditya Shekhawat	
