= Sameer Shah =

Indian actor

Sameer Shah (sometimes known as Samir Shah) is an Indian actor best known for comedy shows. Shah's debut was in Tu Mere Agal Bagal Hai and he has also appeared in Shrimaan Shrimati Phir Se and R. K. Laxman Ki Duniya. (Note: Other shows and films have been associated with an actor named Sameer Shah or Samir Shah, these include: Mrs. Tendulkar; Hasratein; and Rustom. These may or may not refer to the subject of this article.) Of his role in R. K. Laxman Ki Duniya Shah was to say that "he loves playing this role that requires a lot of focus on grammar.", while noting his character Bakulesh has magical powers.
