= Gudgudee (TV series) =

- Directed by: Ajai Sinha
- Starring: See below
- Opening theme: Gudgudee (Title Song)
- Country of origin: India
- Original language: Hindi
- No. of seasons: 1
- No. of episodes: 93

Production
- Producers: Sangeeta Sinha, Raakesh Shah
- Running time: 30 minutes Approx

Original release
- Network: Zee TV
- Release: 1998 – 1999

Gudgudee is an Indian television series that was telecast on Zee TV.

== Cast ==
- Ajit Vachani as Mohan Shukla
- Himani Shivpuri as Durga Shukla
- Ninad Kamat as Raghu Shukla
- Resham Tipnis as Kanchan Shukla (Raghu's wife)
- Bhairavi Raichura as Nikki
- Atul Srivastava as Dhakkan
- Manoj Pahwa as Raghu's mama (uncle)
- Tanaaz Currim as Different roles
- Jatin Kanakia
- Anand Goradia
