= Amroli =

- Neighbourhood
- Location in Gujarat, India Amroli (India)
- Coordinates: 21.239942°N 72.856522°E
- Country: India
- State: Gujarat
- District: Surat
- Talukas: Adajan

Area
  - Total: 15.15 km^{2} (5.85 sq mi)
- Elevation: 13 m (43 ft)

Population (2001)
  - Total: 32,456
  - Density: 2,142/km^{2} (5,549/sq mi)

Languages
  - Official: Gujarati, Hindi
- Time zone: UTC+5:30 (IST)
- Telephone code: 0261
- Vehicle registration: GJ-5
- Nearest city: Surat
- Sex ratio: 664/1000 males ♂/♀
- Website: www.suratmunicipal.gov.in

Amroli is a suburb in around Surat state of gujarat in India. The nearest airport is surat airport.

== Geography ==
The city is located at an average elevation of 12 metres (66 feet).

== Demographics ==
As of 2001 India census, Amroli had a population of 32457. Males constitute 63% of the population and females 38%. Amroli has an average literacy rate of 74%, higher than the national average of 59.5%: male literacy is 81%, and female literacy is 63%. In Amroli, 14% of the population is under 6 years of age.

== Transport ==
- By road: Amroli is in Surat
- By air: Nearest airport is Surat which is 19 km (12 miles) from Amroli.

== See also ==
- Surat
- List of tourist attractions in Surat
- Matthew Amroliwala
