= Ab Ayega Mazaa =

- Poster
- Directed by: Pankaj Parashar
- Produced by: Alok Nath; Girija Shankar
- Starring: Farooq Sheikh; Anita Raj; Ravi Baswani; Alok Nath; Girija Shankar
- Music by: Anand–Milind
- Release date: 12 April 1984
- Country: India
- Language: Hindi

Ab Ayega Mazaa (transl. Now the fun begins) is a 1984 Indian Hindi-language film directed by Pankaj Parashar and produced by actors Alok Nath and Girija Shankar. It stars Farooq Sheikh and Anita Raj . This film introduced music directors Anand–Milind.

== Cast ==
- Farooq Sheikh ... Vijay
- Anita Raj ... Nupur
- Ravi Baswani ... Sidey/Siddharth
- Raja Bundela ... Ramesh
- Satish Kaushik ... Khajju
- Girja Shankar ... Chopra seth, Vijay's boss
- S M Zaheer ... Om seth, Nupur's Father
- Himani Shivpuri ... Mitthu – Chopra's lost Daughter (as Himani Bhatt)
- Vinita Malik... Imarti
- Pavan Malhotra ... Mukti
- Rajesh Puri
- Shoma Anand

== Soundtrack ==
Lyrics: Sameer Anjaan Music: Anand Milind

#	Song title	Singer
1	"Raja Tere Raste Se Hat Jaoongi"	Lata Mangeshkar
2	"Solah Baras Ki Kamsin Umariya"	Kishore Kumar and Asha Bhosle
3	"Kab Jaane Anjaane"	Kishore Kumar and Asha Bhosle
4	"440 Volt Ki Ladki"	Pankaj Mitra and Udit Narayan
5	"Becho Becho"	Mahendra Kapoor and Amit Kumar
