= Jatin Kanakia =

Indian actor (1952/53–1999)

- Jatin Kanakia
- Born: 1952 or 1953
- Died: 26 July 1999 (aged 46); Mumbai, Maharashtra, India
- Occupation: Actor

Jatin Kanakia (1952/1953–1999) was an Indian actor. Best known for comedy roles, his career ranged from working in Gujarati plays, Hindi television shows and Hindi Bollywood movies. His skill and success earned him the title "Prince of Comedy." in indian television

== Career ==
Kanakia's first major television role was in the comedy series, Shrimaan Shrimati, where he played the lead role of Keshav Kulkarni, a married, middle-class house-holder who develops a crush on his movie star neighbour, played by Archana Puran Singh, and a rivalry with her husband, played by Rakesh Bedi, who in turn is drawn to Kulkarni's housewife Reema Lagoo. Broadcast on the national television network, Doordarshan, the series became one of India's most popular television shows. Kanakia also starred in shorter comedy series produced on Doordarshan and played cameos in other comedy series. He worked in many shows produced by the Adhikari Brothers production company, as well as by other producers. Kanakia's success on television led to minor roles in big-budget Hindi films such as Hum Saath Saath Hain.

== Death ==
Kanakia's career was cut short on 26 July 1999 when he died from pancreatic cancer at the age of 46.

== Awards ==
Kanakia was honoured posthumously at the inaugural Indian Telly Awards in 2001 for his contribution to Indian television.

== Filmography ==
=== Television ===
Year	Serial	Role	Channel	Notes
1994–1997	Shrimaan Shrimati	Keshav Kulkarni (Keku, Keshu)	DD Metro	
1995	Kabhi Yeh Kabhi Woh	Chakku	DD Metro	
1995	Zara Hatke			
1995	Padosan	Ajay Tripathi	DD Metro	
1995	Peechha Karo	Sushobhan	DD Metro	
1995	Aghori			
1995	Tejas			
1995	Baat Ek Raaz Ki			
1995	All The Best	Various Characters	DD Metro	
1996–1997	Hum Paanch	Sunil Uncle	Zee TV	
1996	Hi Zindagi Bye Zindagi	Doctor	Zee TV	
1997	Hum Apke Hai Woh	Sunder	Zee TV	
1997	Maal Hai To Taal Hai	Pyarelal	Star Plus	
1997	Kamaal Hai Kamaal	Paltu Ram		
1997	Mrs. Madhuri Dixit	Bunty	Zee TV	
1998–1999	Do Aur Do Paanch	Krishnakant	Zee TV	replaced by Mohan Joshi
1998–1999	Hum Sab Ek Hain	Retd. Brigadier K. K (Kishan Kumar). Khachroo	Sony TV	replaced by Sudhir Pandey
1998	Gudgudee		Zee TV	
1998	Tere Ghar Ke Samne	Professor Lalit Deshpande	DD Metro	
1998–1999	Chashme Baddoor	Chaturdas Chaurasia	Zee TV	
1999	Yes Boss		SAB TV	Recurring Role
2000	Don't Worry Ho Jayega	Moti	Sahara TV	Recurring Role

- Mirch Masala
- Kamaal Hai Kamaal (Doordarshan)

=== Films ===
Year	Film	Role	Notes
1997	Vishwavidhaata	Mr. Anand	
1999	Khoobsurat	Satish Chaudhary	
1999	Hum Saath Saath Hain	Dr. Sen	
1999	Trishakti	Home Minister Vishwanath Pradhan	
