= Anupam Joshi =

American computer security professor

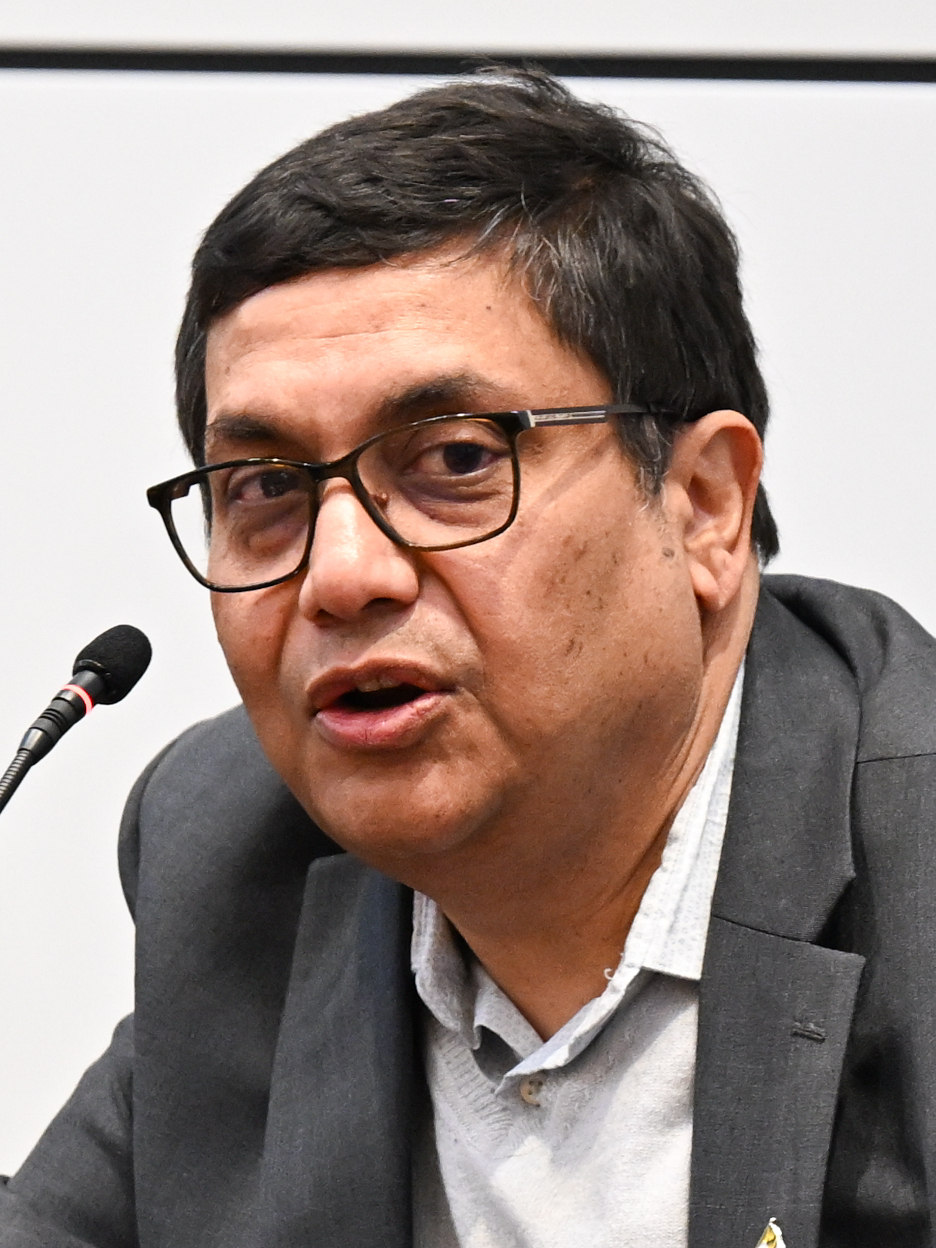
- Joshi in 2025
- Education: IIT Delhi; Purdue University
- Spouse: Karuna Pande Joshi
- Father: Manohar Shyam Joshi
- Scientific career
- Fields: Cybersecurity; Artificial intelligence Mobile Computing
- Workplaces: UMBC; University of Missouri; Purdue University
- Website: www.csee.umbc.edu/~joshi

Anupam Joshi is the Vice Provost, Chief Artificial Intelligence (AI) Officer and Oros Family Professor in the University of Maryland Baltimore County, Baltimore, MD, USA. He is also the Director of the UMBC Center for Artificial Intelligence (CAI) and was the founding Director of UMBC Cybersecurity Institute from 2012-2016.

Professor Joshi is regarded as a leading expert in Artificial Intelligence and Cybersecurity and has often been interviewed by the media for his opinions on cyberattacks, AI and ChatGPT

Professor Joshi was named Fellow of the American Association for the Advancement of Science (FAAAS) in 2026. He was named Fellow of the Institute of Electrical and Electronics Engineers (IEEE) in 2015 for contributions to security, privacy and data management in mobile and pervasive systems.

He was announced as the Top 30 Higher Education Data & AI Influencers 2026 by CDO Magazine.

He was named Fellow of the American Council on Education (ACE) for 2022-23 "UMBC's Anupam Joshi, cybersecurity innovator, to expand leadership impact as 2022–23 ACE Fellow". 2 September 2022. "USM to Host ACE Fellow, UMBC Professor and Department Chair Anupam Joshi".

== Early life ==
Anupam Joshi was born in New Delhi to famous Hindi author Manohar Shyam Joshi and Dr. Bhagwati Joshi. His initial schooling was from Modern School, New Delhi. He earned his undergraduate degree in Electrical Engineering from IIT Delhi and a PhD in computer science from Purdue University.

== Career ==
Anupam Joshi is a member of the Maryland Council of Cybersecurity appointed by the Maryland Attorney General.

Prof. Joshi serves on the AI Advisory Board of the National Association of Higher Education Systems (NASH) where he chairs the Data Infrastructure & Privacy area.

He was the Acting Dean of the UMBC College of Engineering and Information Technology from 2023-2025.

He served as the Chair of the Computer Science and Electrical Engineering Department in the University of Maryland Baltimore County, Baltimore, MD, from 2015-2023.

He led the Accelerated Cognitive Cybersecurity Lab that was supported by IBM.

He is the author of more than 300 refereed publications, with over 35,000 citations and h-index of 98. He has received research grants and contracts from a variety of sources.

Prior to joining the UMBC, he held positions at the University of Missouri, and Purdue University. He was also a Visiting Faculty at the Center of Excellence in Cyber Security and Information Assurance, IIT Delhi.
