= Himani Shivpuri =

Indian actress

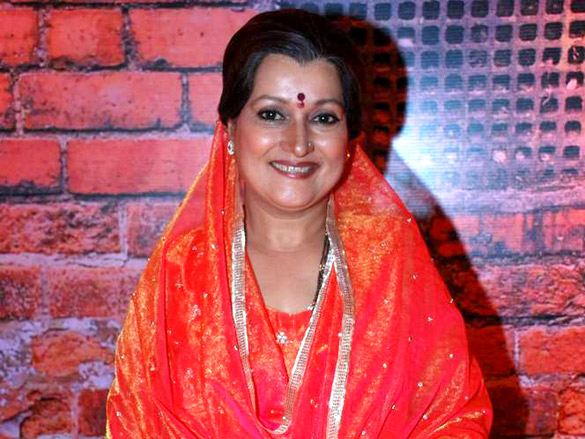
- Himani Shivpuri at the launch of her show, I Luv My India.
- Born: Himani Bhatt; 24 October 1960 (age 65); Dehradun, Uttar Pradesh, India (present-day Uttarakhand, India)
- Education: The Doon School; National School of Drama
- Occupation: Actress
- Years active: 1984–present
- Spouse: Gyan Shivpuri (died 1995)
- Children: 1

Himani Bhatt Shivpuri is an Indian actress who is known for her character roles in Hindi films and soap operas. She is best known for Hum Aapke Hain Koun..! (1994), Raja (1995), Dilwale Dulhania Le Jayenge (1995), Khamoshi (1996), Hero No. 1 (1997), Deewana Mastana (1997), Bandhan (1998), and Kuch Kuch Hota Hai (1998). She has also starred in several other films including Biwi No.1 (1999), Hum Saath-Saath Hain (1999), Kabhi Khushi Kabhie Gham (2001) and Main Prem Ki Diwani Hoon (2003).

She is currently working as Katori "Katto" Amma in &TV's show Happu Ki Ultan Paltan.

== Personal life ==
Shivpuri was born in Dehradun, Uttarakhand. Her father, Haridutt Bhatt Shailesh, was a Hindi teacher and mother Shail Bhatt, is a homemaker. Himani has a brother, Himanshu Bhatt. She was educated at the all-boys boarding school, The Doon School, where her father, was a Hindi teacher as well as a poet with the pen name “Shailesh”. At Doon, she was actively involved in dramatics. She began a parallel career in theatre while studying for a postgraduate degree in Organic Chemistry from DAV College Dehradun, India. Later on, she took admission in National School of Drama for pursuing her acting career in 1982. She worked in Phir Wahi Talash as a supporting actress.

She married actor Gyan Shivpuri, who died in 1995. She has a son, Katyayan.

== Career ==
After graduating from the National School of Drama in 1982, Shivpuri worked briefly with the NSD Repertory Company and then moved to Mumbai.

Shivpuri made her film debut in 1984 with Ab Ayega Mazaa, followed by In Which Annie Gives It Those Ones a TV film, in (1989), also starring Shahrukh Khan. She acted in many art films thereafter like Shyam Benegal's Suraj Ka Satvan Ghoda (1993) and Mammo (1994), though her big commercial break came with Sooraj R. Barjatya's Hum Aapke Hain Koun..! (1994).

She made her television debut with the serial Humrahi (DD National), directed by Kunwar Sinha, which gave her considerable popularity as her role of Devki Bhojai was widely appreciated. Earlier, she had made brief appearances in Lekh Tandon's TV show Phir Wahi Talash and Shyam Benegal's Yatra. After Humrahi, she became a regular feature on Indian television, starring in serials like Hasratein on Zee TV in 1995 as an unsatisfied wife forced to marry a man double her age and looking out for extramarital affairs to satiate her needs, Kasautii Zindagi Kay, Kyunki Saas Bhi Kabhi Bahu Thi as Raksha, Chandni, Dollar Bahu (Zee TV), Josh (Star Plus), Ek Ladki Anjaani Si and most recently in Ghar Ek Sapna (Sahara One) and India Calling (Star One). She has starred in Baat Hamari Pakki Hai on Sony Entertainment Television Asia.

Though she works mainly in character actor, she has done some memorable roles in films like Koyla (1997), Pardes (1997), Dilwale Dulhania Le Jayenge (1995), Anjaam (1994), Kuch Kuch Hota Hai (1998) and Kabhi Khushi Kabhie Gham (2001).

Over the years she has worked for many film production houses including Yash Raj Films (owned by director Yash Chopra), Rajshri Productions and Dharma Productions (owned by Yash Johar).

She was seen in J. P. Dutta's film Umrao Jaan.

Himani Shivpuri played Kul in Zee's Hamari Betiyoon Ka Vivaah until 2009.

She briefly appeared in a short documentary film The Facebook Generation. produced by Blue Strike Productions and Dev Samaj Modern School and Directed by Sahil Bhardwaj. The film competed in the Reel to Real film making competition at Harmony 2012 organised by The Global Education and Leadership Foundation and was among the top 10 finalists.

== Filmography ==
=== Films ===
- Ab Ayega Mazaa (1984) as Sidey's sister
- In Which Annie Gives It Those Ones (1989) (TV)
- Suraj Ka Satvan Ghoda (1992)
- Dilwale (1994) as Sapna's aunt
- Dhanwaan (1993) as Hamidbhai's daughter-in-law
- Mammo (1994) as Anwari
- Hum Aapke Hain Koun..! (1994) as Razia
- Andaz (1994) (uncredited) as Mrs. Panipuri Sharma
- Anjaam (1994) as Nisha
- Yaar Gaddar (1994) as Police Inspector
- Aao Pyaar Karen (1994) as Shankar's wife
- Teesra Kaun? (1994) as Shanti Verma
- Trimurti (1995) as Janki Singh
- Raja (1995) as Kaki
- God and Gun (1995)
- Veergati (1995) as Sulokh's mom
- Dilwale Dulhania Le Jayenge (1995) as Kammo
- Yaraana (1995) as Beggar/Champa
- Haqeeqat (1995) as Kamini
- Bandish (1996)
- Prem Granth (1996) as Nathu
- Khamoshi: The Musical (1996) as Raj's mother
- Bal Bramhachari (1996) as Shanti
- Beqabu (1996) as Aarti Kapoor
- Diljale (1996)
- Pardes (1997) as Kulwanti
- Hero No. 1 (1997) as Shannu
- Koyla (1997)
- Mere Sapno Ki Rani (1997) as Subhash's wife
- Betaabi (1997) as Radha, professor
- Deewana Mastana (1997) as Raja's mom
- Mr. and Mrs. Khiladi (1997) as Raja's mother
- Tirchhi Topiwale (1998)
- Jab Pyaar Kisise Hota Hai (1998) as Ragini Sinha
- Bandhan (1998) as Ramlal's wife
- Kuch Kuch Hota Hai (1998) as Rifat Bi
- Mehndi (film) (1998)
- Dahek: A Burning Passion (1999) as Mrs. Javed Bahkshi
- Nyaydaata (1999)
- Hum Saath-Saath Hain: We Stand United (1999) as Vakil's wife
- Aa Ab Laut Chalen (1999) as Mrs. Chaurasia
- Daag: The Fire (1999) as Kajri's mother
- Anari No. 1 (1999) as Rahul's Aunt
- Biwi No.1 (1999) as Susheela Devi Mehra
- Trishakti (1999) as Mrs. Laxmiprasad
- Hum Tum Pe Marte Hain (1999) as Umadevi
- Vaastav: The Reality (1999) as Laxmi Akka
- Khoobsurat (1999) as Savita
- Krodh (2000) as Sita
- Dulhan Hum Le Jayenge (2000) as Mary
- Baaghi (2000)
- Hadh Kar Di Aapne (2000) as Mrs. Bakhiyani
- Chal Mere Bhai (2000) as Sapna's aunt
- Tera Jadoo Chal Gayaa (2000) as Shyama Aapa
- Hamara Dil Aapke Paas Hai (2000) as Sita Pillai
- Karobaar: The Business of Love (2000) as Mrs. Saxena
- Dhaai Akshar Prem Ke (2000) as Sweety
- Jis Desh Mein Ganga Rehta Hain (2000) as Radha Ganga's biological mom
- Afsana Dilwalon Ka (2001) as Titlibai
- Jodi No.1 (2001) as wife of Kamal
- Mujhe Kucch Kehna Hai (2001) as Sushma
- Bas Itna Sa Khwaab Hai (2001)
- Kabhi Khushi Kabhie Gham (2001) as Haldiram's Wife
- Haan Maine Bhi Pyaar Kiya (2002) as Maria
- Hum Kisise Kum Nahin (2002) as Patient Ramgopal's wife
- Mujhse Dosti Karoge! (2002) as Mrs. Sahani
- Jeena Sirf Merre Liye (2002) as Mrs. Malhotra
- Karz: The Burden of Truth (2002)
- Ek Aur Ek Gyarah (2003) as Tara & Sitara's mom
- Main Prem Ki Diwani Hoon (2003) as Susheela
- Kuch Naa Kaho (2003) as Minty Ahluwalia
- Shart: The Challenge (2004)
- Ishq Hai Tumse (2004) as Kamla
- Stop! (2004) as Mrs. A. Mehra
- Time Pass (2005) as Kanchan Sharma
- Mumbai Godfather (2005)
- Chand Sa Roshan Chehra (2005)
- Meri Aashiqui (2005)
- Classic Dance of Love (2005)
- Insan (2005) as Indu's mother
- Khullam Khulla Pyaar Karen (2005) as Goverdhan's wife
- Koi Mere Dil Mein Hai (2005) as Mrs. I. M. Gore
- Maayavi (2005) (Tamil film) as Jyothika's mother
- Umrao Jaan (2006)
- Kismat Konnection (2008) as Mrs. Manpreet Gill
- Haal-e-Dil (2008) as Stella
- Karzzzz (2008) as J. J. Oberoi's Wife
- Do Knot Disturb (2009) as Goverdhan's mother
- Radio (2009) as Shanya's Boss at Food Court
- Milenge Milenge (2010) as Mrs. Gandhi
- Sasural Simar Ka (2011) as Rajjo Dwivedi (Buaji)
- 3 Bachelors (2012) as Shalini Devi
- Rabba Main Kya Karoon (2013)
- Besharam (2013) as Tara's Mother
- Club 60 (2013) as Nalini Doctor
- Mr Joe B. Carvalho (2014)
- Meena (2014) as Ainul Bibi
- Wedding Pullav (2015) as Gulabo
- Bin Phere Free Me Ttere (2015)
- Nanu Ki Jaanu(2018) as Nanu's Mother
- When Obama Loved Osama (2018)
- Make In India (2019) as Palak Mother
- Ammaa Ki Boli (2019) as Kalavati
- Teesra Kaun Returns (2020) Shanti Aunty
- Kartoot (2022) as Khala
- Binny And Family (2024)

=== Serials ===
- Hum Aapke Hain Woh (1996-1997)
- Khatta Meetha (2000)
- Kyunki Saas Bhi Kabhi Bahu Thi as Raksha (Daksha's Sister)
- Yatra
- Phir Wahi Talash
- Humrahi
- Hamari Betiyoon Ka Vivaah as Kulraj Kohli
- Hasratein as Sulakshana
- Gudgudee (1998-1999) as Durga Devi
- Sanjog Se Bani Sangini as Shanno
- I Luv My India
- Baat Hamari Pakki Hai as Nani
- Sasural Simar Ka as Rajjo Dwivedi
- Mrs. Kaushik Ki Paanch Bahuein as Mrs. Lajwanti)
- Ghar Ek Sapna
- Ajab Gajab Ghar Jamai as Nani-Saas
- Doli Armaano Ki as Sushma Tiwari (Sushmaji)
- Sumit Sambhal Lega as Rita
- Vishkanya...Ek Anokhi Prem Kahani as Renu
- Ek Vivah Aisa Bhi as Kalavati Parmar
- Home as Nirmala Manchanda
- Happu Ki Ultan Pultan as Katori "Amma" Singh
- Astitva...Ek Prem Kahani as Radha Ji
