= Mungerilal Ke Haseen Sapne =

- Written by: Neeraj Kumar, Manohar Shyam Joshi
- Directed by: Prakash Jha
- Country of origin: India
- No. of seasons: 1
- No. of episodes: 52

Original release
- Network: DD National
- Release: 1989 – 1990

Mungerilal Ke Haseen Sapne is an Indian television series directed by Prakash Jha that revolved around the life of Mungerilal, played by Raghubir Yadav. The serial was conceptualised by Neeraj Kumar who also gave it its iconic name which has stuck in the collective conscience of its audience. Neeraj Kumar took inspiration from James Thurber's story Secret Life of Walter Mitty and went on to script the first four episodes of the show. Subsequent episodes were written by Manohar Shyam Joshi. Its hugely popular and celebrated theme song- 'Sapnon Ke Naam Nahin, sapnon ke daam nahi, sapno ke ghodon par kissi ki lagaam nahi, Mungerilal ke Haseen Sapne...' was also penned by Neeraj Kumar.

== Plot ==
Mungerilal is a small-time clerk who gets bossed around by his wife at home and by his boss at office. To top that, Mungerilal's father in law rubs salt on Mungerilal wounds by exaggerating his own achievements as a Police Inspector. Mungerilal overcomes all this by day dreaming, where he takes revenge on his boss, his father-in-law. Mungerilal also dates his beautiful colleague. As he basks in the glory of his accomplishments, his wife wakes him up to ruin dream. It was somewhat inspired by the principles of a wish fulfillment device.

== Cast ==
- Raghubir Yadav as Mungerilal
- Ruma Ghosh as Mungerilal's wife
- Kamia Malhotra as Miss Madhu Malkani
