= Anand Goradia =

Indian television actor

- Born: 23 November 1975 (age 50); Essex, United Kingdom
- Occupation: Actor
- Years active: 1992–present

Anand Goradia is an Indian television actor and writer. He is known for his roles in ROAR: Tigers of the Sundarbans (2014), Sanskaar Laxmi (2011) and Adaalat (2010). He played the role of Bundi ruler Rao Surtan Singh in Bharat Ka Veer Putra – Maharana Pratap.

He received his college degree from Parag Vijay Dutt Drama Academy, Mumbai as an acting major. His first acting debut was in Zee TV's show Commando.

He has acted in noted TV series like Na Aana Is Des Laado and Maayke Se Bandhi Dor.

== Television ==
Year	Title	Role	Notes
1994	Shrimaan Shrimati		One episode
1996–1997	Aahat		Six episodes
1996	Hasratein	Bittu Khanna	
1998	Gudgudee		One episode
1999	Jamai Raja		
2003	Bhabhi	Tanakesh	
2003–2004	Kayaamat – Jabb Bhi Waqt Aata Hai	Yashwant "Babu"	
2009–2010	Maniben.com	Rishi	
2011-2016	Adaalat	Public Prosecutor IM Jaiswal & Expert Company Diver YM Jaiswal	Parallel Lead
2011	Na Aana Is Des Laado	Gajender Sangwan	
2011	Maayke Se Bandhi Dor	Prabhu	
2013	Fear Files	Jayant	
2013–2014	Bharat Ka Veer Putra – Maharana Pratap	Rao Surtan Singh	
2014	Devon Ke Dev...Mahadev	Pushpadanta	
2015	Chakravartin Ashoka Samrat	Agnibahu	
2015	Bhanwar		
2016	CID	Himaan	One episode
2017	Yeh Moh Moh Ke Dhaagey		
2017–2018	Tenali Rama	Ghungru	
2017–2019	Shakti - Astitva Ke Ehsaas Ki	Maharani	
2017–2021	Vighnaharta Ganesha	Narad Muni	
2018–2019	Dastaan-E-Mohabbat Salim Anarkali	Khanam Khwazariya	
2023	Swaraj	Lala Har Dayal	
