= Satyam Sankaramanchi =

Indian writer (1937–1987)

- Born: 3 March 1937; Amaravathi village, Guntur district
- Died: 1987
- Occupation: Writer
- Writing career
- Language: Telugu
- Notable works: Amarāvati Kathalu, Ākhari Prēmalēkha

Satyam Sankaramanchi (3 March 1937 – 1987) was an Indian storyteller, born in the village of Amaravati near Guntur City, in Andhra Pradesh, India. The stories he told wove a whole new world around the tiny village of Amaravati.

Amaravati Kathalu is regarded by Mullapudi as one of the best short story series in Telugu. P. S. Murthy mentions that Amaravati Kathalu is one of the best volumes of short stories in Telugu. D. Anjaneylu mentions that it is a notable work.

His short story "The Flood" has been translated into English. Some of his stories were also televised by the movie maker Shyam Benegal as a series called Amravathi Ki Kathayen. Died on 21 April 1987

== Selected works ==
- Ākhari Prēmalēkha
- Amarāvati Kathalu
- Kārtīka Dīpālu
- Rēpaṭidāri
