= Anshuman Vichare =

Indian actor

- Born: 1975 (age 50–51); Mumbai, India
- Citizenship: India
- Occupations: Actor; director; producer

Anshuman Vichare (born 1975) is an Indian actor, director, producer, and television personality. He made his film debut as a minor character in the Oscar-nominated Marathi movie Shwaas. He has also worked as an assistant director and presented various televised shows.

== Filmography ==
Movie	Year of release
Shwaas	2004
Bharat Aala Parat	2007
Bhulwa	2007
Varat Aali Gharat	2009
Hungama	2010
Ved Laavi Jeeva	2010
Marathi Paul Padte Pudhe	2011
Soor Rahu De	2013
Misal Pav	2014
Poshter Boyz	2014
Sangharsh	2014
Partu	2015
Shinma	2015
Well Done Bhalya	2016
Irsaal Gavachi Irsaal Manse	(Yet to be released)
Salute to 7.33 Hutatma Rajguru	(Yet to be released)
Damaad Ke Intezaar Mein	2013
1234	(Yet to be released)
Copy	1 November 2019
Dhingana	20 November 2017
Vitthala Shappath	(Yet to be released)
Shishyavrutti	15th March 2024
Manjar	2026
