= Jaggu Ki Lalten =

- Directed by: Vipin Kapoor
- Written by: Vipin Kapoor
- Produced by: Preeti Gupta
- Music by: Manish Sahriya
- Production companies: Shrihans Arts and Creations Pvt. Ltd., Bolt Entertainment
- Release date: 14 October 2022
- Running time: 2 hours
- Country: India
- Language: Hindi

Jaggu Ki Lalten is an Indian Hindi-language comedy-drama musical film that was released on 14 October 2022. It was directed and written by Vipin Kapoor, produced by Preeti Gupta, co-produced by Nitin Bharti, and executive produced by Ashish Sharma. The film was created under the Shrihans Arts and Creations Pvt. Ltd. banner in collaboration with Bolt Entertainment. The music for the film was composed by Manish Sahriya, and it stars Rambir Aryam and Neeraj Gupta in the lead roles. The cast also includes Aakriti Bharti, Rajendra Bhatia, Biren Dang, Raaj Gopal Iyer, and Namrita Malla.

== Plot ==
Jaggu ki Lalten tells the story of Hari Lal Bhoot, initially a scrap dealer who later became a successful businessman. Known for his good business sense and kind nature, Hari Lal has a positive reputation in his local community. The film provides a glimpse into the life of an ordinary person who, through successful dealings in the scrap industry, improved his financial situation. Hari Lal faced challenges early in life, which motivated him to make a positive impact on those around him.

During a routine business trip, Hari Lal meets Jaggu, an ordinary man facing various challenges. Touched by Jaggu's situation, Hari Lal promises to help him get his life back on track. The story unfolds, showing Hari Lal's commitment as he faces different obstacles to fulfill his promise of giving Jaggu the life he deserves.

== Reception ==
A reviewer from Filminformation mentioned that Vipin Kapoor's direction is weak, mirroring the shortcomings of the script. Manish Sahriya's music and background score serve their purpose but don't stand out. The lyrics by Mayank Gera are unremarkable. Sooraj Katoch's choreography is uninspiring, and Jan Kashyap's camerawork doesn't significantly enhance the drama. Puneet Kapoor's production design is unimpressive, and Vikas Phougat's editing is loose.

In a review by Abhishek Srivastava of the Times of India, who gave only 2.5 stars out of 5, it was noted that the comedy in 'Jaggu ki Lalten' is unintentional, but it manages to bring a smile to your face. The sequences featuring Raghuvir Yadav are particularly engaging. This drama is not a bad film overall; it has a good storyline, but the majority of the cast's performances and the direction are below par, which hinders its potential.

Gagan Gurjar of Asianet News described 'Jaggu Ki Lantern' as a wholesome family film with a story and content that deeply touches the heart.
