= Naseeruddin Shah filmography =

Indian actor and director

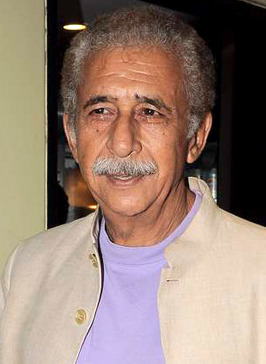
Naseeruddin Shah

Naseeruddin Shah (born 20 July 1950) is an Indian actor and director. He has acted in over 100 films and directed the 2006 Bollywood film, Yun Hota Toh Kya Hota, starring Irrfan Khan and Konkana Sen Sharma.

He began his acting career playing Vishwan in the 1975 Hindi film, Nishant. Since then, he has done several movies in English and some regional languages of India while he mainly appeared in Hindi films.

He published his autobiography in 2014, titled And then one day: A Memoir.

== Feature films ==
Key
†	Denotes films that have not yet been released

=== Hindi films ===
Year	Film	Role	Notes	Ref.
1975	Nishant	Vishwam		
1976	Manthan	Bhola		
1977	Bhumika	Sunil Verma		
1977	Godhuli	Priest		
1978	Junoon	Sarfaraz Khan		
1978	Hungama Bombay Ishtyle	Raju		
1979	Sparsh	Aniruddh Parmar		
1979	Sunayana	Raju		
1980	Beqasoor	Sunil Verma		
1980	Aakrosh	Bhaskar Kulkarni		
1980	Albert Pinto Ko Gussa Kyoon Aata Hai	Albert Pinto		
1980	Hum Paanch	Suraj		
1980	Khwab	Gopal 'Gopi' Mathur		
1981	Chakra	Lukka		
1981	Sazaye Maut	Uday Jagirdar / Omkar Puri		
1981	Tajurba			
1981	Umrao Jaan	Gohar Mirza		
1982	Bazaar	Salim		
1982	Sitam	Subhash		
1982	Dil...Akhir Dil Hai	Vimal Mehta		
1983	Jaane Bhi Do Yaaro	Vinod Chopra		
1983	Katha	Rajaram Purshottam Joshi		
1983	Masoom	D.K. Malhotra		
1983	Mandi	Tungrus		
1983	Woh Saat Din	Dr. Anand		
1983	Ardh Satya	Mike Lobo		
1984	Paar	Naurangia		
1984	Mohan Joshi Hazir Ho!	Advocate Malkani		
1984	Maan Maryada	Thakur Ganga Singh		
1984	Party	Amrit	Cameo	
1984	Holi	Professor Singh		
1984	Khandhar	Subhash		
1985	Ghulami	SP Sultan Singh		
1985	Trikaal	Ruiz Pereira		
1985	Mirch Masala	Subedar		
1985	Apna Jahan	Anil Sahani		
1985	Khamosh	Captain Bakshi		
1986	Karma	Khairuddin Chishti		
1986	Genesis	The Farmer		
1986	Musafir			
1987	Jalwa	Inspector Kapil		
1987	Yeh Woh Manzil To Nahin	Trivedi		
1987	Ijaazat	Mahender		
1988	Hero Hiralal	Hero Hiralal		
1988	Maalamaal	Raj		
1988	Rihaee	Mansukh		
1988	Pestonjee	Phirojshah		
1989	Tridev	Jay Singh		
1989	Khoj	Inspector Singh		
1990	Police Public	Sr. Inspector Mahar Singh Gadhwal		
1990	Chor Pe Mor	Inspector Chanakya		
1991	Ek Ghar	Rajashekhara K. S		
1991	Sau Crore	Somnath		
1991	Lakshmanrekha	Amar Kapoor		
1992	Vishwatma	Suryapratap Singh		
1992	Chamatkar	Amar Kumar (Marco)		
1992	Panaah	Devaa		
1992	Hasti	Vishal		
1992	Tahalka	Captain Ranvir		
1993	Sir	Professor Amar Verma		
1993	Lootere	Sikander		
1994	Mohra	Mr. Kushal Jindal		
1994	Kabhi Haan Kabhi Naa	Father Breganza		
1994	Drohkaal	DCP Abbas Lodhi		
1995	Naajayaz	Raj Solanki		
1995	Takkar	Inspector De Costa		
1996	Himmat	Luka		
1996	Chaahat	Ajay Narang		
1997	Bombay Boys	Mastana		
1997	Daava	Bhishma		
1998	Chinagate	Major Sarfaraz Khan		
1998	Dandnayak			
1999	Sarfarosh	Gulfaam Hasan		
1999	Bhopal Express	Bashir		
1999	Kabhi Pass Kabhi Fail	Punjabi Restaurant Owner		
2000	Hey Ram	Mahatma Gandhi	Bilingual film	
2001	Kasam	Mangal Singh		
2001	Monsoon Wedding	Lalit Verma		
2002	Encounter: The Killing	Inspector Bharucha		
2002	3 Deewarein	Ishaan		
2003	Maqbool	Inspector Purohit		
2004	Asambhav	Sameer "Sam" Hans		
2004	Main Hoon Na	Brig. Shekhar Sharma		
2005	Paheli	Male Puppet (voice)		
2005	Iqbal	Mohit		
2006	Being Cyrus	Dinshaw Sethna		
2006	Krrish	Dr. Siddhant Arya		
2006	Omkara	Bhaisaab		
2006	Shoonya	Old man		
2006	Yun Hota Toh Kya Hota	Narrator		
2006	Banaras	Babaji		
2006	Valley of Flowers	Yeti	Bilingual film	
2007	Parzania	Cyrus		
2007	Amal	G.K. Jayaram		
2007	Dus Kahaniyaan	Muslim Man	Segment: "Rice Plate"	
2008	Mithya	Gawde		
2008	Shoot on Sight	Tariq Ali		
2008	Jaane Tu... Ya Jaane Na	Amar Singh Rathore		
2008	A Wednesday!	A Common Man		
2008	Maharathi	Jaisingh Adenwalla		
2008	Mere Baap Pehle Aap	Nirmal Kapoor		
2008	Bombay to Bangkok	Khan		
2009	Barah Aana	Shukla		
2009	Firaaq	Khan Sahab		
2009	Bolo Raam	N.S. Negi		
2010	Peepli Live	Salim Kidwai		
2010	Ishqiya	Iftikhar		
2010	Raajneeti	Bhaskar Sanyal		
2010	Allah Ke Banday	Warden		
2011	7 Khoon Maaf	Dr. Modhusudhon Tarafdar		
2011	That Girl in Yellow Boots	Diwakar		
2011	The Blueberry Hunt	Colonel		
2011	Zindagi Na Milegi Dobara	Salman Habib		
2011	The Dirty Picture	Suryakanth		
2011	Chaalis Chauraasi	Pankaj Purushottam Suri (Sir)		
2011	Michael	Michael		
2011	Chargesheet	The Boss		
2012	Maximum	Arun Inamdar		
2013	Sona Spa	Baba Dayanand		
2013	Jackpot	Boss		
2013	Siddharth	Jisa		
2013	Mastaan			
2013	John Day	John Day		
2013	Krrish 3	Dr. Siddhant Arya	Cameo	
2013	Taak Jhaank		Bilingual film	
2014	Dedh Ishqiya	Iftekhar (Khalu Jaan)		
2014	Dil Bhi Khaali Jeb Bhi Khaali			
2015	Dirty Politics	Manoj Singh		
2015	Dharam Sankat Mein	Neel Anand Baba		
2015	Welcome Back	Wanted Bhai		
2015	Charlie Kay Chakkar Mein	Sanket Pujari		
2015	Waiting	Prof. Shiv Kumar		
2016	Bankster	Babbar		
2016	Teraa Surroor	Robin "Bird" Dharamraj Santino		
2016	The Blueberry Hunt	Colonel		
2017	Ok Jaanu	Gopi Shrivastava		
2017	Irada	Parabjeet Walia		
2017	Begum Jaan	Raja Sahib		
2017	The Hungry	Tathagat Ahuja		
2018	Aiyaary	Baburao Shastri		
2018	Hope Aur Hum	Nagesh Srivastava		
2019	The Tashkent Files	PKR Natrajan		
2019	Ramprasad Ki Tehrvi	Babuji		
2020	Mee Raqsam	Hashim Seth		
2022	Gehraiyaan	Vinod Khanna		
2022	Naam Tha Kanhaiyalal	Himself	Documentary	
2023	Kuttey	Narayan Khobre		
2025	Fateh	Raza		
2025	Gustaakh Ishq	Aziz Baig / Babba		
2026	Safia/Safdar			
2026	Assi	The umbrella man		
2026	Main Vaapas Aaunga	Ishar Singh Grewal		
2027	Maharagni: Queen of Queens †		Filming	

=== Other language films ===
Year	Film	Role	Language	Notes
1977	Tabbaliyu Neenade Magane	Shastri	Kannada	
1980	Bhavni Bhavai	King Chakrasen	Gujarati	
1982	Naseeb Ni Balihari		Gujarati	
1983	Protidan	Prabhat Roy	Bengali	
1988	The Perfect Murder	Inspector Ghote	English	
1990	Mane (The House)	Rajshekar	Kannada	
1994	Ponthan Mada	Sheema Thampuran	Malayalam	
1998	Such A Long Journey	Jimmy Bilimoria	English	
2000	Hey Ram	Mahatma Gandhi	Tamil	Bilingual film
2003	The League of Extraordinary Gentlemen	Captain Nemo	English	
2005	The Great New Wonderful	Avi	English	
2006	Valley of Flowers	Yeti	Japanese	
2007	Khuda Ke Liye	Maulana Wali	Urdu	
2009	Today's Special	Akbar	English	
2011	Deool	Dacoit	Marathi	
2013	Khasi Katha– A Goat Saga	Butcher	Bengali	
2013	Zinda Bhaag	Pehlwan	Punjabi	
2013	The Coffin Maker	Anton Gomes	English	
2013	Sunglass		Bengali	
2014	Finding Fanny	Ferdinand "Ferdie" Pinto	English	
2014	Khasi Katha	Butcher	Bengali	
2016	Mango Dreams	Abhay	English	
2016	Jeewan Hathi		Urdu	
2016	Gardaab		Urdu	
2017	Dhh	Magician Surya Samrat	Gujarati	
2024	Far From Home	—N/a	Afghan, Hindi and English	Documentary; Executive Producer
2025	The Brown Heart	Himself	English	Documentary; Commentary
2026	Rehmat	Rashid Ali	Punjabi, English	World premiere in the main competition of the 79th Locarno Film Festival
2026	O.M: Operation Mole †	Abdul Hameed	Tamil	

=== As director ===
- Yun Hota To Kya Hota (2006)

== Short films ==
Year	Title	Role	Notes	Ref.
2010	Wilson Periera		Voice	
2014	Interior Cafe Night	The Man		
2017	Punarjanma	Narrator	Voice	
2018	Skin Of Marble	Bhupinder Singh		
2018	Rogan Josh	Vijay Kapoor		
2019	Bin Bulaaye	Saket Diwan		
2019	The Wallet	Samar		
2022	Half Full	Stranger		
2022	The Miniaturist Of Junagadh	Hussain Sahab		
2022	The Daughter			
2023	2100 Foot	Gulshan Jorahat		
2023	The Broken Table	Giridhar		
2023	Man Woman Man Woman	—N/a	Director and writer only	

== Television ==
Year	Title	Role	Notes	Ref.
1988	Bharat Ek Khoj	Shivaji I		
1988	Mirza Ghalib	Ghalib		
1988	Param Vir Chakra	Abdul Hamid		
1992	Electric Moon	Rambuhj Goswami	Television film	
1998	Turning Point	Host		
1999	Tarkash	Praveen		
2007	Karamchand	Mr. Roy	Guest	
2015	Mid Wicket Tales	Host		
2020	Bandish Bandits	Radhe Mohan Rathod		
2022	Kaun Banegi Shikharwati	Raja Mrityunjay Singh Shikharwat		
2022	Modern Love Mumbai	Pappi Singh	Episode: "Mumbai Dragon"	
2023	Taj: Divided by Blood	Akbar		
2023	Saas, Bahu Aur Flamingo	Sahebji		
2023	Charlie Chopra & The Mystery Of Solang Valley	Dr. Rai		
2024	Showtime	Viktor Khanna		
2024	IC 814: The Kandahar Hijack	Cabinet Secretary IAS Vinay Kaul		
2026	Made In India: A Titan Story	J. R. D. Tata		
