= Shyamanand Jalan =

Indian theatre director and actor (1934–2010)

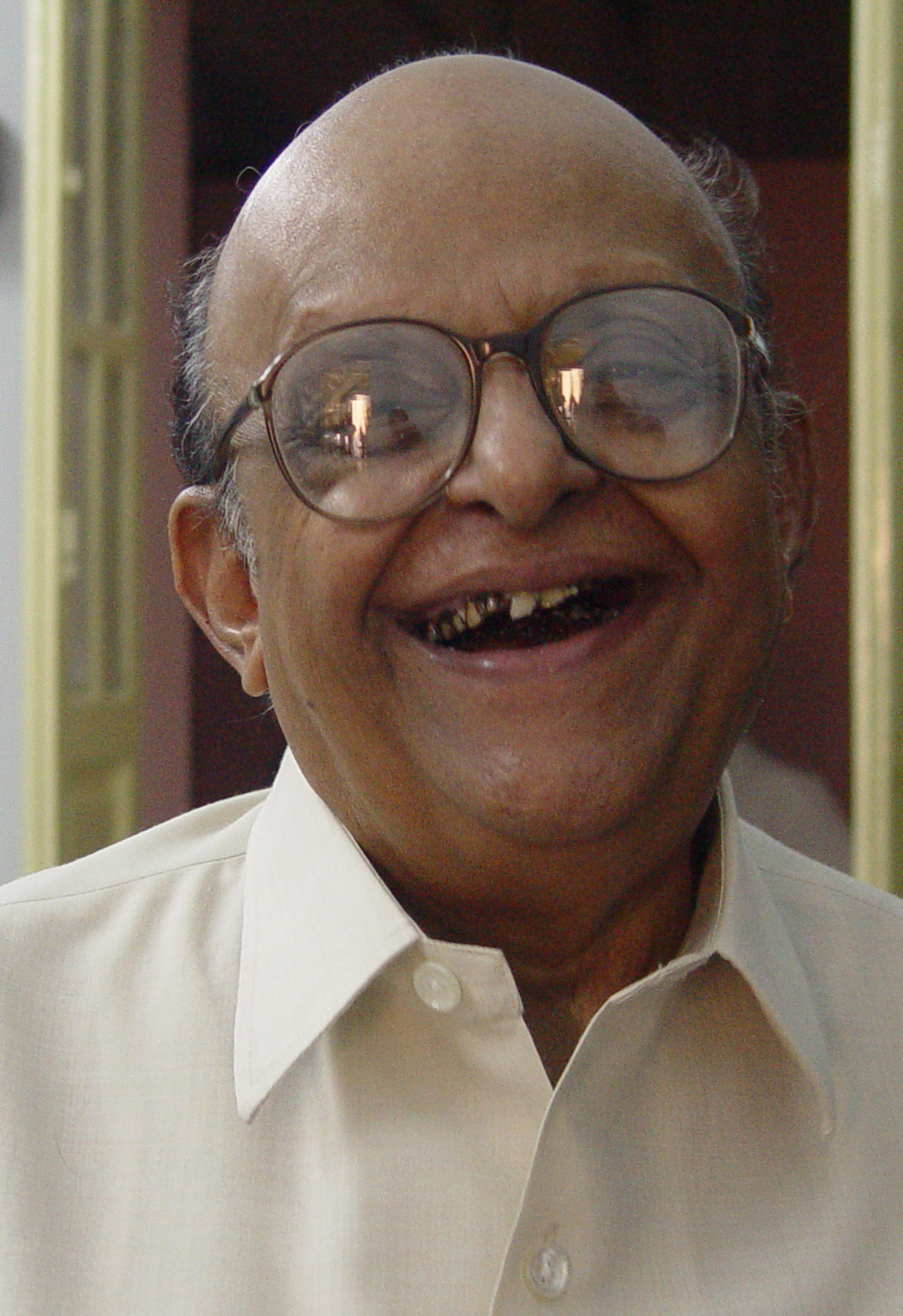
- Shyamanand Jalan in 2004
- Born: 13 January 1934; Muzaffarpur, Bihar and Orissa Province, British India
- Died: 24 May 2010 (aged 76); Kolkata, West Bengal, India
- Education: Scottish Church College, Calcutta
- Occupations: Theatre director; actor
- Years active: 1949–2009
- Organization(s): Vice-chairman, Sangeet Natak Akademi (1999–2004)
- Known for: Founder and director of the Padatik theatre group (1972)

Shyamanand Jalan (13 January 1934 – 24 May 2010) was a Kolkata-based Indian theatre director and actor. He is credited for the renaissance period of modern Indian theatre and especially the Hindi theatre in Kolkata from the 1960s to 1980s. He was the first to perform modernist Mohan Rakesh, starting with Ashadh Ka Ek Din (One Day in Ashad) in 1960 and in the coming years bridged the gap between Hindi theatre and Bengali theatre, by mounting Hindi productions of works by Bengali playwrights, like Badal Sircar's Evam Indrajit (And Indrajit, 1968) and Pagla Ghoda (Mad House, 1971), which in turn introduced Sircar to rest of the country. His big screen venture Eashwar Mime Co. (2005) was an adaptation of Dibyendu Palit's story, Mukhabhinoy, by Vijay Tendulkar.

As an actor in stage plays, he appeared as the don in Roland Joffe's 1992 film City of Joy. He also worked with parallel cinema directors. He acted in Mrinal Sen's television series, Tasveer Apni Apni, and later in Arohan by Shyam Benegal, Kahan Kahan Se Guzar Gaya by MS Sathyu, and Chokh (1982) by Utpalendu Chakrabarty.

Jalan co-founded theatre group Anamika in 1955, impresario organisation Anamika Kala Sangam in 1967, and later in 1972, he left Anamika to form his own Padatik theatre group, of which he remained director for the rest of his life; Padatik Dance Center was launched in 1989, a school for Classical and Contemporary Dance in Kolkata. He received the 1972 Sangeet Natak Akademi Award for Direction, awarded by the Sangeet Natak Akademi, India's National Academy of Music, Dance & Drama, and later remained the vice-chairman of the Akademi (1999–2004).

== Early life and education ==
Born in Muzaffarpur, Bihar, to a Kolkata-based Marwari family of Ishwari Prasad Jalan, who was a solicitor by profession and later turned to politics, Jalan studied at the Scottish Church College of the University of Calcutta, and was a part of the Burrabazar Students' Congress.

== Career ==
=== Early career and Anamika years ===
Jalan started his career as a lawyer and subsequently headed a legal firm in Kolkata, and at the same time also worked both as a theatre actor and director.

He started his acting career with play Naya Samaj in 1949, followed by Samasya (1951) directed by Tarun Roy in 1951. He directed his play Ek Thi Rajkumari (1953), a children's play, written by Roy, in Hindi. This was followed by Konark (1954) by Jagdish Chandra Mathur and Chandragupta (1955) by Seth Govind Das. He continued to act in most of his plays, sometimes playing the lead and even into his later years.

Jalan was the first theatre director to recognise the plays of Mohan Rakesh, when he staged his Ashadh Ka Ek Din (One Day in Ashadh) in 1960, which had a competition organised by the Sangeet Natak Akademi in 1959, and was soon established as the first modern Hindi play. This was also a breakthrough play for Jalan as well, as for the first time he was able to showcase an in-depth study of the complexity of human existence, to critical acclaim. He subsequently staged Lehron Ke Rajhans (Swans of the Waves) in 1966 and Adhe Adhure (Halfway House) (1970), where he and his wife Chetna played the leads. His Hindi productions captured the magical realism of Bengali playwright Badal Sircar's Evam Indrajit (1968), Pagla Ghora (Mad Horse) in 1971 in brought Sircar to national limelight. He was equally adept in handling harsh realism of Marathi playwright Vijay Tendulkar's Sakhārām Binder and Khamosh Adalat Jari Hai (Hindi version of Shantata! Court Chalu Aahe), Panchi Aise Aate Hain (Thus Arrive the Birds) from his Ashi Pakhare Yeti in Marathi in 1971, Gidhade (The Vultures) in 1973 and Kanyadan (1987).

His other plays include Kauva Chala Hans ki Chal, Gyandev Agnihotri's Shuturmurg (Ostrich) (1967) and a production of Romanian playwright Mihail Sebastian's Breaking News as Chhapte chhapte (Going to Print) in 1963, in the arena format.

His production displayed his respect for the script as he didn't alter a word, and over the year he started a collaborative approach towards his productions with the playwright, a new trend in Indian theatre. He often invited playwrights to the rehearsals, Mohan Rakesh who had been sceptical to excessive directorial influence on the integrity of the drama-in-performance, spent three weeks with the group, in Kolkata ahead of the 1966 production of Lehron Ke Rajhans, and even rewrote the third act several times, completed two days before the opening night of the production, and revised it yet again before its publication in late 1966, and in time it became one of the important productive playwright-director relationship in Indian theatre. While working on Evam Indrajit he extensively collaborated with Sircar.

Jalan co-founded the theatre group Anamika in 1955 with Pratibha Agrawal, a Hindi writer and a great granddaughter of Bhartendu Harishchandra, which played a pioneering role in the revival of Hindi theatre. and remained with it till 1972, and during this period it created a large audience for Hindi theatre in Bengali speaking Kolkata. At the time, Usha Ganguly of Rangakarmee' was only other director, to be actively involved in Hindi theatre in the city, just as Satyadev Dubey was in Bombay.

=== Padatik ===
Jalan co-established the impresario institution Anamika Kala Sangam in 1967. Subsequently, along with his wife Chetana Jalan, the well-known Kathak dancer and stage actress, and actor Kulbhushan Kharbanda, he left Anamika in 1971 and established Padatik (literally foot-soldier) theatre group in 1972, of which he was the founding director. This gave him a chance to venture into bolder themes, like those in Vijay Tendulkar's plays like Gidhade (The Vultures) (1973) and Sakharam Binder (1979), and Mahashweta Devi's Hazar Chaurasi Ki Ma (Mother of 1084) (1978), with his new venture he stepped beyond Indianism, modernism, or experimentalism. Padatik in the coming years, started inviting outside directors like, Ranjit Kapoor, Satyadev Dubey, Bennevitz, Rajinder Nath, and Rodney Marriot, and soon the group was performing three productions in a year. In time, dramatic speech and theatricality became the hallmark of Padatik plays and most notably Badal Sircar's Evam Indrajit (And Indrajit) remembered for its stylised movement and speech.

Along with his wife, he founded the Padatik dance school in Kolkata, for classical as well as contemporary dance. He also remained associated with Natya Shodh Sasthan Kolkata, an archive of Indian theatre for many years. Long before trend government funded festivals started, he organised the first performing arts festival, a "Chhau Festival" bringing together three forms of Chhau dance, i.e. Seraikella, Mayurbanj, Purulia, together on one platform, in March 1977 in Kolkata. Padatik also organised workshops on dance, lec-dems of Gurus of Indian dance including Kelucharan Mohapatra, Vempati Chinna Satyam, Guru Bipin Singh, Birju Maharaj, apart from organising three major international theatre, dance, martial arts conferences in which theatre personalities like Peter Brook, Eugenio Barba, Tadashi Suzuki, Richard Schechner, Anna Halprin and leading theatre directors and actors from all over India, participated.

He also acted in Bengali productions, such as Tughlaq (1972), a Bengali version of Girish Karnad's play performed by Padatik under his own direction, for Pashchimbanga Natya Unnayan Samity, which featured stage actors, like Sombhu Mitra, Debabrata Dutta and Rudraprasad Sengupta. He is credited for not only reviving Hindi theatre in Kolkata, but also by performing plays by Bengali playwrights like Badal Sircar's Paagla Ghoda and Evam Indrajit in Hindi, bridging the gap between North Indian and Bengali theatre. He brought Kalidasa`s Sanskrit play Abhijñānaśākuntalam as Sakuntala to stage in 1980 with lyrical dance movements of Odissi, and G. P. Deshpande`s politically charged Marathi-play Uddhwasta Dharmashala (A Man in Dark Times) in 1982.

Jalan translated plays by Henrik Ibsen like Janta ka Shatru (An Enemy of the People) in 1959, Brecht, Raja Lear from Shakespeare's King Lear, and Moliere's The Bourgeois Gentleman and The School for Wives. He adapted Rabindranath Tagore, Ghare Baire (Home and Outside) in 1961, and dramatised Mahashweta Devi's classic novel Hazar Churashir Ma (Mother of 1084) as Hazar Chaurasi Ki Ma in 1978. He later worked as the vice-chairman of the Sangeet Natak Akademi from 1999 to 2004., and as the chairman of the Kathak Kendra, New Delhi and Science City and the Birla Industrial & Technological Museum (BITM), Kolkata. He had also been governing body member of the National Council of Science Museums. He also directed Ramkatha Ram-Kahani (1995), performed by dancers from Padatik Dance Centre, under Chetna Jalan.

In 2005, he directed his first and only film Eashwar Mime Co., an adaptation of Dibyendu Palit's story, Mukhabhinoy, by Vijay Tendulkar. The film is story of a travelling mime company selling products and a writer's views upon its journey, it has two lead Ashish Vidyarthi playing the role mime company's owner while Pawan Malhotra did the role of the writer. Though it didn't get commercial released during his lifetime, it was screened at Durban International Film Festival, the 3 Continents Festival and the Kolkata Film Festival.

Nearly 42 years after he first presented Mohan Rakesh's Lehron Ke Rajhans, he presented a new version, at the Bharat Rang Mahotsav of the National School of Drama in 2009, to critical acclaim. The brochure of play reproduced two letters, one written by Jalan asking the playwright for clarifications and guidelines, and in the second the reply of Rakesh two months later, in fact after their discussions he rewrote third act.

Jalan died after a long illness at Kolkata on 24 May 2010, survived by his wife and six children.

== Legacy ==
Jalan's film Eashwar Mime Co. (2005), based on the art of mime, was premiered at India Habitat Centre, New Delhi on 2 August 2010, thereafter with a special screening on 11 September 2010 at Nandan theatre in Kolkata, the film was commercially released. Padatik constituted the "Shyamanand Jalan National Youth Theatre Award" for original scripts from Indian playwrights aged between 18 and 25 years, in 2011.

On 4 December 2010, the book Shyamanand Jalan: A Pictorial Tribute by Madhuchhanda Chatterjee was published at Rabindra Sadan, Kolkata, followed by excerpts of some plays directed by him, enacted by actors he trained, or organised by Anamika Kala Sangam and Padatik. Also presented was Remembering Shyamanand by Rajinder Nath, Samik Bandyopadhyay, Pratibha Agrawal & others and a homage by Padatik, and 5th a Seminar titled, Kolkata Hindi Theatre and Shyamanand Jalan was held at the venue followed by a screening of excerpts from his works.

The 13th Bharat Rang Mahotsav, the annual theatre festival of National School of Drama featured a special section on him. On 20 January 2011 at Kamani Auditorium, Delhi, a retrospective-homage by Padatik, directed by Vinay Sharma, presented excerpts from five plays directed by Shyamanand Jalan, showcasing at least one representative work from each decade of the Padatik years, including Madhavi (2006), Ramkatha Ram-Kahani (1995), Adhey Adhurey (1983) and Sakharam Binder (1978).

== Productions ==
- Ek Thi Rajkumari (1953)
- Konark (1954)
- Chandragupta (1955)
- Naye hath (New Hands) (1957)
- Janta ka Shatru (An Enemy of the People) (1959)
- Ashadh Ka Ek Din (One Day in Ashad) (1960)
- Ghare Baire (Home and Outside) (1961)
- Chhapte chhapte (Going to Print) (1963)
- Lehron Ke Rajhans (Swans of the Waves) (1966)
- Shuturmurg (Ostrich) (1967)
- Evam Indrajit (One more Indrajit) (1968)
- Adhe Adhure (Halfway House) (1970)
- Pagla Ghora (Mad Horse) (1971)
- Tughlaq (1972)
- Gidhade (The Vultures) (1973)
- Hazar Chaurasi Ki Ma (Mother of 1084) (1978)
- Sakharam Binder (1979)
- Sakuntala (1980)
- Panchi Aise Aate Hain (Thus Arrive the Birds) (1981)
- Uddhwasta Dharmashala (A Man in Dark Times) (1982)
- Kanyadan (1987)
- Ramkatha Ram-Kahani (1995)
- Madhavi (2006)
- Lehron Ke Rajhans – New Version (2009)
- Ek Tha Jalan – The Horse-od Version (2012)

== Bibliography ==
- Aparna Bhargava Dharwadker (2005). Theatres of independence: drama, theory, and urban performance in India since 1947. University of Iowa Press. ISBN 0-87745-961-4.
