= Manthan =

- Directed by: Shyam Benegal
- Written by: Kaifi Azmi (dialogue)
- Screenplay by: Vijay Tendulkar
- Story by: Verghese Kurien; Shyam Benegal
- Starring: Girish Karnad; Smita Patil; Naseeruddin Shah
- Cinematography: Govind Nihalani
- Edited by: Bhanudas Divakar
- Music by: Vanraj Bhatia
- Production company: Gujarat Co-operative Milk Marketing Federation Ltd.
- Release date: 1976 (India)
- Running time: 134 minutes
- Country: India
- Language: Hindi

Manthan, also released under the translated title The Churning, is a 1976 Hindi film directed by Shyam Benegal, inspired by the pioneering milk cooperative movement of Verghese Kurien, and written jointly by him and Vijay Tendulkar. It is set amidst the backdrop of the White Revolution of India. Aside from the great measurable success that this project was, it also demonstrated the power of "collective might" as it was entirely crowdfunded by 500,000 farmers who donated Rs. 2 each. Manthan is the first crowdfunded Indian film.

The film won the 1977 National Film Award for Best Feature Film in Hindi and National Film Award for Best Screenplay for Vijay Tendulkar, and was also India's submission for the Academy Award for Best Foreign Language Film in 1976. A restored version was released in the Cannes Classics section of the 2024 Cannes Film Festival.

The title song ("Mero Gaam Katha Parey") was sung by Preeti Sagar. She won the Filmfare Award for Best Female Playback Singer for that year. The song was later used as the soundtrack for the television commercial for Amul.

== Plot ==
Dr. Manohar Rao, a young veterinary doctor with his team of Deshmukh, Chandravarkar, and others comes to a village in Kheda district, Gujarat. The village is inhabited by poor people whose chief occupation seems to be cattle-rearing and producing milk, which they sell to a local dairy owner Mishra. Mishra pays them excessively low amounts for their milk. Dr. Rao and his team have arrived to set up a Cooperative society dairy which will be owned collectively and managed by the villagers themselves. As Dr. Rao and his team grapple with village politics, rigid casteism, and general distrust of the village folk, they face planned hostility from the local Dalit community's leader Bhola who harbours deep anger and resentment against the upper-caste Sarpanch (Panchayat Head). Local village women are led by a feisty young woman Bindu, mother of a young child whose husband has supposedly left her.

Dr. Rao wins the trust of Bindu and other villagers by testing their milk and paying them fair amounts for their high fat-content milk and this irks Mishra. Deshmukh is worried by the caste politics and divide between the upper-castes and Dalits in the village and repeatedly warns Rao against getting involved in it. Chandravarkar gets attracted to a local Dalit girl and has a rendezvous with her in secret. The Dalits don't want to join the cooperative as they feel that the upper-caste Sarpanch and his cronies will usurp the society as well. Rao and his associates talk sense into them and organise an election for the post of the head of the cooperative. Bhola begins to trust and believe in Rao's ideals when Rao fires Chandravarkar for cheating the Dalit girl on the pretext of marrying her and bails Bhola out of jail when Sarpanch gets him arrested for rowdy behaviour.

Meanwhile, a mutual admiration and liking develops between Rao and Bindu, which is cut short when Bindu's husband returns home suddenly, and Rao's wife comes to visit him in the village. In the election, the Dalit representative Moti (nominated by Bhola) defeats the Sarpanch in a tiebreaker and the Dalits erupt in joy. The Sarpanch takes the loss terribly on his ego and joins Mishra, also aided by Bindu's husband. Together, they manipulate Bindu into putting her thumb impression on legal papers that claim Dr. Rao has raped her. Dr. Rao is extremely agitated when the allegations are brought against him and starts to wonder if he has bitten off more than he can chew. His wife also falls sick with Typhoid. Dr. Rao finishes the setting up of the board and leaves with his wife, greatly troubling Bhola. Bhola, however, continues to carry on the work of the cooperative with support from a few villagers and notably, Bindu. Both of them have been inspired and churned as new, brave individuals by the work of Dr. Rao.

== Cast ==
- Girish Karnad as Dr. Rao
- Smita Patil as Bindu
- Naseeruddin Shah as Bhola
- Sadhu Meher as Mahapatra (Special Appearance)
- Anant Nag as Chandavarkar
- Amrish Puri as Mishraji
- Kulbhushan Kharbanda as The Sarpanch
- Mohan Agashe as Deshmukh
- Abha Dhulia as Shanta, Dr. Rao's wife
- Anjali Paigankar
- Rajendra Jaspal as Bindu's husband

== Development and production ==
The word manthan literally means "churning", and other meanings may be deep contemplation, the churning of facts, analysis aimed at a solution, or conclusion. The film traces a small set of poor farmers of Kheda district in Gujarat who had the vision and foresight to act in a way that was good for the society and not for the self alone. Under leaders like local social worker Tribhovandas Patel, who took up the cause of the farmers, lead to the formation of Kaira District Co-operative Milk Producers' Union. Soon the pattern was repeated in each district of Gujarat, which in turn led to the formation of Amul, a dairy cooperative in Anand, Gujarat in 1946, which is today, jointly owned by some 2.6 million milk producers in Gujarat, India. Amul is the acronym for Anand Milk Union Limited.

Eventually, this led to the initiation of White Revolution of India in 1970, by creating a "Nationwide Milk Grid", and the setting up of Gujarat Co-operative Milk Marketing Federation Ltd. (GCMMF) in 1973, whose 500,000 members jointly financed the film, by donating Rs. 2 each. Upon its release, truckloads of farmers came to see "their" film, thus making it a box office success.

== Release ==
The film was released on Blu-ray by the UK-based distributor Second Run on 27 October 2025, based on the 4K restoration by Film Heritage Foundation.

== Restoration ==
The film was restored by Film Heritage Foundation at Prasad Studios, Chennai and L’Immagine Ritrovata Laboratory, in association with Gujarat Co-operative Milk Marketing Federation Ltd. (Amul), cinematographer Govind Nihalani, and director Shyam Benegal. The film was shot on Gevacolor, Eastman, and Kodak in the 1970s. Due to this, Govind Nihalani was unhappy with the final outcome at the time. After seeing the restored print, he was happy. The original camera negative from the NFAI and a 35 mm print preserved at the Film Heritage Foundation archive were used for the restoration.

The film was repaired by FHF conservators. Prasad Lab in Chennai performed scanning and digital clean-up under the supervision of the Bologna-based L'Immagine Ritrovata lab. The restored version was selected for a world premiere at the Cannes Film Festival 2024‘s Cannes Classics strand. A special premiere of the restored film was held on World Milk Day - June 1, 2024 - at Eros Cinema in Mumbai that was attended by Shyam Benegal and the cast and crew of the film. The film was released in 51 cities and 101 cinemas across India on June 1 and 2, 2024.

== Soundtrack ==
All music is composed by Vanraj Bhatia.

No.	Title	Playback	Length
1.	"Mero Gaam Katha Parey"	Preeti Sagar

== Awards and nominations ==
Year	Award	Category	Nominee(s)	Result
1976	National Film Awards	Best Feature Film in Hindi	Shyam Benegal	Won
1976	National Film Awards	Best Screenplay	Vijay Tendulkar	Won
1978	Filmfare Awards	Best Female Playback Singer	Preeti Sagar (For Mero Gaam Katha Parey)	Won

Awards
Preceded by Nishant	National Film Award for Best Feature Film in Hindi; 1977	Succeeded by Junoon
