= Anant Nag =

Indian actor and politician (born 1948)

- Nag in 2026
- Born: 4 September 1948 (age 78); Shirali, Bombay Presidency, Dominion of India (present-day Uttara Kannada district, Karnataka, India)
- Occupation: Actor
- Years active: 1973–present
- Works: Filmography
- Spouse: Gayatri (m. 1987)
- Relatives: Shankar Nag (brother); Arundathi Nag (sister-in-law)
- Awards: Filmfare Awards; Karnataka State Film Awards; Karnataka Rajyotsava Award (2007); Karnataka State Lifetime Achievement Award
- Honours: Karnataka Rajyotsava Award (2007); Dadasaheb Phalke Award (2024); Padma Bhushan (2025)

Minister for Bangalore Development, Government of Karnataka
- In office 6 June 1996 – 7 October 1999
- Chief Minister: J. H. Patel

Member of the Karnataka Legislative Assembly
- In office 1994–1999
- Preceded by: Jeevaraj Alva
- Succeeded by: M. R. Seetharam
- Constituency: Malleshwaram

Member of the Karnataka Legislative Council
- In office 1988–1994

Personal details
- Party: Janata Party (1983–1988); Janata Dal (1988–1999); Janata Dal (United) (1999–2003); Janata Dal (Secular) (2003–2004)

Anant Nagarkatte (born 4 September 1948), popularly known as Anant Nag, is an Indian actor whose predominant contribution has been in Kannada cinema. He has acted in over 300 films which include over 250 Kannada films and few films in Hindi, Telugu, Tamil, Marathi, Malayalam and English languages. He has featured in theatre plays, parallel cinema and television shows. He was honoured with Dadasaheb Phalke Award for his contribution to cinema for the year 2024.

Nag made his feature film debut through Sankalpa (1973) directed by Prof. P.V Nanjaraj Urs. Sankalpa went on to win seven state awards in Karnataka. His foray into parallel cinema was through Shyam Benegal's Ankur (1974). His commercially successful Kannada films have been Bayalu Daari (1976), Kanneshwara Rama (1977), Naa Ninna Bidalaare (1979), Chandanada Gombe (1979), Benkiya Bale (1983), Hendthige Helbedi (1989), Ganeshana Maduve (1990), Gowri Ganesha (1991), Mungaru Male (2006), Godhi Banna Sadharana Mykattu (2016), Raajakumara (2017), Sarkari Hi. Pra. Shaale, Kasaragodu, Koduge: Ramanna Rai (2018), K.G.F: Chapter 1 (2018), Aduva Gombe(2019), K.G.F: Chapter 2 (2022) and Gaalipata 2 (2022).

He acted in Malgudi Days, a Doordarshan aired television series based on the stories of R. K. Narayan. He is a recipient of six Filmfare Awards South and five Karnataka State Film Awards. He is the elder brother of director and actor Shankar Nag.

Anant was awarded the Padma Bhushan, India's third highest civilian award, in 2025 by the Government of India.

== Early life ==
Anant Nag was born in a Chitrapur Saraswat Brahminfamily on 4 September 1948 to Anandi and Sadanand Nagarkatte in Shirali, Bhatkal taluk, Uttara Kannada district, Karnataka, where he spent most of his childhood. He has an elder sister, Shyamala and his younger brother was Shankar Nag.

Nag did his early schooling in a Catholic school in Ajjarkad, Udupi, Ananda Ashrama in Dakshina Kannada and Chitrapur Math in Uttara Kannada district of the erstwhile Mysore state (now Karnataka). In class 9th standard, he was sent to Mumbai for further study. He attempted to join the armed services but was rejected by the Army for being underweight and by the Air Force for poor eyesight. He was drawn towards the theatre movement of Mumbai and he was selected to act in Konkani, Kannada and Marathi-language plays which he did until he turned 22.

== Career ==
=== Theatre ===
Anant Nag began his career with Kannada and Konkani plays in Mumbai. He went on to work in plays of Satyadev Dubey, Girish Karnad and Amol Palekar. For a period of about five years, he acted in Konkani, Kannada, Marathi and Hindi plays.

=== Film and television ===
Following a theatre career in Mumbai, Nag made his film debut with Sankalpa, a 1973 Kannada film. He then grew to become a core part of parallel cinema, which was at its peak in the 1970s and 1980s. Being introduced to director Shyam Benegal by theatre director Satyadev Dubey, he starred in six of Benegal's films: Ankur (1974), Nishant (1975), Manthan (1976), Bhumika (1978), Kondura (1978) and Kalyug (1981).

Nag's arrival into Kannada films was through G. V. Iyer's Hamsageethe (1975), in which he played the role of a disciple of carnatic singing. The film went on to win the National Film Award for Best Feature Film in Kannada.

Nag appeared in thirteen episodes of the television series, Malgudi Days, an adaptation of R. K. Narayan's short stories of the same name, directed by his brother Shankar.

Nag's portrayal of an Alzheimer's patient in Godhi Banna Sadharana Mykattu (2016) has received critical acclaim and contributed to making this experimental film, a commercial success. In the comedy-drama Gaalipata 2 (2022), he played Kishore, a Kannada-language professor. Muralidhara Khajane of The Hindu felt his "fantastic portrayal as a teacher and Ganesh's sentimental turn are the hallmarks of this film".

== Personal life ==
Nag married Kannada actress Gayatri on 9 April 1987.

== Political career ==
Anant Nag was an MLC, MLA and a minister in the J. H. Patel government. He served as Bangalore Urban Development minister. In 2004, he unsuccessfully contested the Chamarajpet constituency, Bangalore assembly election from Janata Dal (Secular). He was pitched against then Chief Minister of Karnataka, S. M. Krishna from the Indian National Congress and fellow actor Mukhyamantri Chandru from Bharatiya Janata Party. On 22 February 2023 BJP, Karnataka state unit organised a programme in the presence of state president Nalin Kumar Kateel where Anant Nag was said to join BJP, but he didn't attend the programme and later the programme was cancelled.

== Awards ==
Nag receiving the Padma Bhushan in 2025

Nag receiving the Dadasaheb Phalke Award for 2024

Year	Award	Ref
2024	Dada Saheb Phalke Award	
2025	Padma Bhushan	

Karnataka State Film Awards
Year	Award type	Film	Ref(s)
1979–80	Best Actor	Minchina Ota	
1985–86	Best Actor	Hosa Neeru	
1987–88	Best Actor	Avasthe	
1994–95	Best Actor	Gangavva Gangamayi	
2011–12	Dr. Vishnuvardhan Award	Lifetime Achievement	

Filmfare Awards South
Year	Award type	Film	Result
1977	Best Actor (Telugu)	Prema Lekhalu	Nominated
1979	Best Actor (Kannada)	Naa Ninna Bidalaare	Won
1982	Best Actor (Kannada)	Bara	Won
1989	Best Actor (Kannada)	Hendthighelbedi	Won
1990	Best Actor (Kannada)	Udbhava	Won
1991	Best Actor (Kannada)	Gauri Ganesha	Won
2016	Best Actor (Kannada)	Godhi Banna Sadharana Mykattu	Won
2008	Best Supporting Actor (Kannada)	Tajmahal	Nominated
2008	Best Supporting Actor (Kannada)	Aramane	Nominated
2015	Best Supporting Actor (Kannada)	Vaastu Prakaara	Nominated
