= Theatrecian =

Theatrecian is an English-language theatre group in India. It was recognised by BBC Four as the most prolific English theatre group in the country. The group was founded on 4 January 2001 by Tathagata Chowdhury, Kanak Gupta, Dhruv Mookerji and Prithviraj Chowdhury.

In the last 14 years, Theatrecian has presented about 99 plays and has performed in the four major metros in India.

== The Comedy Kitchen and The Murder Menu ==
One of the more popular productions of Theatrecian is The Comedy Kitchen. This play has been performed at The Comedy Store, The Laughter Factory, NCPA, the Liberty Theatre in Mumbai and The Alliance Franchise in Delhi along with shows in Kolkata.

== The Mumbai Zoo ==
The Mumbai Zoo is an original production that represented India at the South Asian Theatre Festival 2014 in Cincinnati. It is a one-act play which runs for one hour and has a park bench as the only prop. The play was first performed at Padatik and then at the Prithvi Theatre in Mumbai. Udaan, an organisation in South Mumbai, presented The Mumbai Zoo in 2009 at the National Gallery of Modern Art, Mumbai.

The Mumbai Zoo is inspired by Edward Albee's play The Zoo Story. and has won awards for Best Script and Best Actor at State level Theatre Competitions. The Mumbai Zoo tries to reflect on the 1993 Bombay bombings from the perspective of a terrorist. It's not Communal but Communism that triggers a deprived soul to express his angst against the "haves" of the society.

The play is about a "have not" from a mixed economy who wishes to break the cages separating the passengers of the first class and second class compartments. Both characters of Raquib, a "regular" individual with one wife, one daughter and one dog and Dhruv, a rebel with a cause who spits on Raquib's regularity, are performed by Tathagata Chowdhury.

== Silence! The Court is in Session ==
This English adaptation of Vijay Tendulkar's Marathi language play was performed at the International Council for Cultural Relations (ICCR) in September, 2015.

Silence!... is about a traveling theater group that stages a play revolving around the hypocrisy of the society where a woman is subjected to being characterless and has to prove her worth. It was performed by Ishani Priyodarshini, Anushka Dasgupta, Apratim Chatterjee, Aaron Targain, Anushree Tapdar, Zahid Hossain, Arush Sengupta and Sneha Malakar.
