= Badal Sircar =

Indian playwright

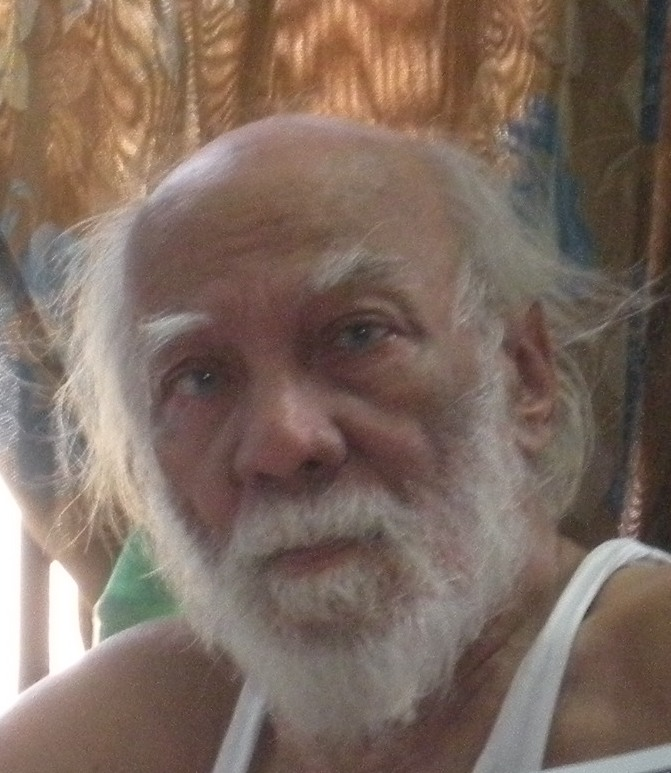
- Badal Sarkar in 2010
- Born: Sudhindra Sircar; 15 July 1925; Calcutta, Bengal Presidency, British India
- Died: 13 May 2011 (aged 85); Kolkata, West Bengal, India
- Occupations: playwright, theatre director
- Years active: 1945–2011
- Notable work: Evam Indrajit (And Indrajit) (1963); Pagla Ghoda (Mad Horse) (1967)
- Awards: 1968 Sangeet Natak Akademi Award; 1972 Padma Shri; 1997 Sangeet Natak Akademi Fellowship

Sudhindra Sircar (15 July 1925 – 13 May 2011), also known as Badal Sarkar, was an influential Indian dramatist and theatre director, most known for his anti-establishment plays during the Naxalite movement in the 1970s and taking theatre out of the proscenium and into public arena, when he transformed his own theatre company, Shatabdi (established in 1967 for proscenium theatre ) as a third theatre group . He wrote more than fifty plays of which Ebong Indrajit, Basi Khabar, and Saari Raat are well known literary pieces. A pioneering figure in street theatre as well as in experimental and contemporary Bengali theatre with his egalitarian "Third Theatre", he prolifically wrote scripts for his Aanganmanch (courtyard stage) performances, and remains one of the most translated Indian playwrights. Though his early comedies were popular, it was his angst-ridden Evam Indrajit (And Indrajit) that became a landmark play in Indian theatre. Today, his rise as a prominent playwright in the 1960s is seen as the coming of age of Modern Indian playwriting in Bengali, just as Vijay Tendulkar did it in Marathi, Mohan Rakesh in Hindi, and Girish Karnad in Kannada.

He was awarded the Padma Shri in 1972, Sangeet Natak Akademi Award in 1968 and the Sangeet Natak Akademi Fellowship, the highest honour in the performing arts by Govt. of India, in 1997.

== Early life and education ==
Badal Sircar, whose real name was 'Sudhindra Sarkar', was born in Calcutta, India to a Bengali Christian family. He was initially schooled at the Scottish Church Collegiate School. After transferring from the Scottish Church College, where his father was a history professor, he studied civil engineering at the Bengal Engineering College (now IIEST), Shibpur, Howrah then affiliated with the University of Calcutta. In 1992, he finished his Master of Arts degree in comparative literature from Jadavpur University in Calcutta.

== Career ==
While working as a town planner in India (at Damodar Valley Corporation), England and Nigeria, he entered theatre as an actor, moved to direction, but soon started writing plays, starting with comedies. Badal Sirkar did experiments with theatrical environments such as stage, costumes and presentation and established a new genre of theatre called "Third Theatre". In Third Theatre approach, he created a direct communication with audience and emphasised on expressionist acting along with realism. He started his acting career in 1951, when he acted in his own play, Bara Trishna, performed by Chakra, a theatre group.

Eventually still employed in Nigeria, he wrote his landmark play Ebong Indrajit (And Indrajit) in 1963, which was first published and performed in 1965 and catapulted him into instant fame, as it captured "the loneliness of post-Independence urban youth with dismaying accuracy". He followed them with plays like Baaki Itihaash (Remaining History) (1965), Pralap (Delirium) (1966), Tringsha Shatabdi (Thirtieth Century) (1966), Pagla Ghoda (Mad Horse) (1967), Shesh Naai (There's No End) (1969), all performed by Sombhu Mitra's Bohurupee group.

In 1967, he formed the "Shatabdi" theatre group, and the first production he directed was Ebang Indrajit in 1967, a play about three people – Amal, Bimal, Kamal and a loner Indrajit. In the next five years of its existence the troupe performed several of his plays and had a profound impact on contemporary theatre, especially after 1969 when it started performing plays both indoors and outside amidst people, and evolved the angan manch (courtyard stage) and inspired by the direct communication techniques of Jatra rural theatre form, to eventually become his "Third Theatre", a protest against prevalent commercial theatre establishment. Often performed in "found" spaces rather than rented theatre halls, without elaborate lighting, costumes or make-up, where audience was no longer a passive, rather became participatory, it added a new realism to contemporary dramaturgy, retaining thematic sophistication of social committed theatre all the while, and thus started a new wave of experimental theatre in Indian theatre. In 1976, his group "Satabdi", started performing at Surendranath Park (then Curzon Park) Kolkata on weekends. These open-air and free performances led to his troupe travelling to nearby villages on other weekends, where it employed minimal props and improvised dialogues to involve audience further into the performance.

Though he continued to hold his job till 1975, as a playwright he rose to prominence in the 1970s and was one of the leading figures in the revival of street theatre in Bengal. He revolutionised Bengali theatre with his wrath-ridden, anti-establishment plays during the Naxalite movement.

His plays reflected the atrocities that prevailed in the society, the decayed hierarchical system and were socially enlightening. He is a proponent of the "Third theatre" movement that stood ideologically against the state. Third theatre involved street plays, with actors being attired no differently than the audience. Also the formal bindings of the proscenium theatre was given up. Sarkar's "Bhoma" is an example of a third theatre play, set as always, in an urban background. Starting with Sagina Mahato, which marked his advent into arena stage, his subsequent plays, Michhil (Juloos), Bhoma, Basi Khobor, Spartacus based on Howard Fast's historical novel by the same name, were performed in parks, street corners and remote villages with the audience sitting all around.

Sircar directed his last play in 2003, and after that his movements were restricted after a road accident, but even many years later till 2011 he continued performing at play readings and writing new works like adapting William Shakespeare's Macbeth, two stories by Graham Greene and a novel, History of Love.

Kerala Sangeetha Nataka Akademi awarded the prestigious 'Ammannur Puraskaram' in 2010 for his lifetime achievements in Indian Theatre. The award was presented to him by Girish Karnad during the inaugural function of 3rd edition of International Theatre Festival of Kerala (ITFoK).

== Death ==
Sarkar was diagnosed with colon cancer in April 2011. He died on 13 May at Kolkata at the age of 85.

== Awards and recognition ==
Sarkar was awarded the prestigious Jawaharlal Nehru Fellowship in 1971, the Padma Shri by the Government of India in 1972, Sangeet Natak Akademi Award in 1968 and the Sangeet Natak Akademi Fellowship- Ratna Sadsya, the highest honour in the performing arts by Govt. of India, in 1997, given by Sangeet Natak Akademi, India's National Academy for Music, Dance and Drama.

In 2004, Amol Palekar put together Badal Sircar Festival in Pune. Quotation from Anjum Katyal's Badal Sircar: Towards a Theatre of Conscience (Foreword by Amol Palekar, 2015):

"All the theatre stalwarts, such as Dubey, Shyamanand Jalan, Pratibha Agarwal, Vijay Tendulkar, Amrish Puri, Rajinder Nath, Kulbhushan Kharbanda, Naseeruddin and Ratna Pathak Shah, Mahesh Elkunchwar, Nilu Phule, Rohini Hattangadi and Jaidev Hattangadi, Nana Patekar and many others participated in the festival. On the concluding day, once again I did Juloos with newcomers from various colleges of Pune. Badal-da's interview for almost half a day proved to be the centre of attraction. On behalf of the entire theatre world, we handed over a significant amount to Badal-da as his 80th birthday gift, which he could not refuse. Overwhelmed by the genuine love of the audience he experienced in Pune, Badal-da expressed his gratitude in one line: <your love is going to keep me alive for at least the next 20 years.'"

The "Tendulkar Mahotsav" held at the National Film Archive of India (NFAI), Pune in October 2005, organised by director Amol Palekar to honour playwright Vijay Tendulkar, was inaugurated with the release of a DVD and a book on the life of Badal Sircar.

In July 2009, to mark his 85th birthday, a five-day-long festival titled Badal Utsava as tribute to him was organised by several noted theatre directors. He was offered the Padma Bhushan by the Government of India in 2010, which he declined, stating that he is already a Sahitya Akademi Fellow, which is the biggest recognition for a writer.

== In media ==
Sarkar is the subject of two documentaries, one directed by filmmaker and critic, Amshan Kumar, and another A Face in the Procession by Sudeb Sinha, which was shot over two years.

== Legacy ==
Badal Sircar influenced a number of film directors, theatre directors as well as writers of his time. Film director Mira Nair in an interview mentioned, "For me, Kolkata was a formative city while growing up.... I learned to play cricket in Kolkata, but more than anything, I learned to read Badal Sircar and watch plays written by him for street theatre. " To Kannada director and playwright, Girish Karnad, Sircar's play Ebong Indrajit taught him fluidity between scenes, while as per theatre director-playwright Satyadev Dubey, "In every play I've written and in every situation created, Indrajit dominates." To Actor-director Amol Palekar, "Badalda opened up new ways of expression." Recently (2013), a newly established cultural group, Maniktala Kolpokatha has started their theatrical career paying homage to the great play writer, staging "Ballavpurer Roopkatha". To the group, it is one of the plays that is not often staged in the Kolkata Theatre Circuit, and has all the spices of love, laughter and fear.

== List of plays ==
- Evam Indrajit (And Indrajit) (1963)
- Basi Khabar
- Baaki Itihaash (Remaining History) (1965)
- Pralap (Delirium) (1966)
- Tringsha Shatabdi (Thirtieth Century) (1966)
- Pagla Ghoda (Mad Horse) (1967)
- Shesh Naai (There's No End) (1969)
- Spartacus
- “Ram, Shyam, Jadu”
- Prastava
- Michhil (Procession)
- Bhoma
- Solution X
- Baropishima
- Saara Raattir
- Baro Pisima
- Kabi Kahini
- Manushe Manushe
- Hottomalar oparey
- Bollovpurer rupkatha
- Sukhapathya bharoter itihash(Indian History Made Easy)
- Gondi (adaptation from 'Caucasian Chalk Circle' by Bertolt Brecht)
- Nadite Dubiye Dao (Adaptation from 'We come to the river' by Edward Bond)
- Sinri
- bagh
- Ka Cha Ta Ta Pa (A satire)
- Bagala Charit Manas
- Ore Bihanga
- Dwirath
- Manushe Manushe
- Janmavumi Aaj (A poetry Monaz)
- Mara-Saad
- Choruivati (An adaptation from "Picnic in the Battlefield" by Fernando Arrabal)

== Works ==
- The Third Theatre. Pub. Sircar, 1978
- The changing language of Theatre (Azad memorial lectures). Pub. Indian Council for Cultural Relations (ICCR), 1982.

=== Plays in translation ===
- Evam Indrajit: Three-act Play. tr. by Girish Karnad. Oxford University Press. 1975. ISBN 0-19-560312-5.
- Three plays : Procession, Bhoma, Stale news. tr. by Samik Bandyopadhyay. Seagull. 1983.
- Beyond the Land of Hattamala & Scandal in Fairyland. tr. by Suchanda Sarkar. Seagull Books, 2003 . ISBN 81-7046-091-3.
- Two Plays: Indian History Made Easy, Life of Bagala, tr. by Subhendu Sarkar. OUP, 2009. ISBN 978-0-19-806549-4.
- Pagala Ghoda, tr. in Marathi by Amol Palekar

== See also ==
- Theatre in India

== Bibliography ==
- Jain, Kirti. Badal Sircar: Search for a Language of Theatre. New Delhi: Niyogi Books, 2016, 460 pages, ISBN 9789383098965.
- Katyal, Anjum. Badal Sircar: Towards a Theatre of Conscience (A Series on Contemporary Indian Playwrights). New Delhi: SAGE Publications, 2015, 308 pages, ISBN 9789351503705.
- Kundu, Manujendra. So Near, Yet So Far: Badal Sircar's Third Theatre. New Delhi: Oxford University Press, 2016, 324 pages, ISBN 9780199464777.
- Roy, Pinaki. "The First Man of the Third Theatre: Badal Sircar". Insights into Indian English Fiction and Drama. Ed. Nawale, A. New Delhi: Access-Authors Press, 2012 (ISBN 978-81-921254-3-5), pp. 164–81.
- Roy, Pinaki. “Crusader against Hegemonies: A Brief Study of Badal Sircar". Contemporary Indian Drama in English: Trends and Issues. Ed. Sarkar, J. New Delhi: Delta Book World, 2013 (ISBN 978-81-926244-0-2). pp. 23–42.
- Dasgupta Anjan, Badal Sircar's Evam Indrajit: Issues of Writing, Reading and Narrativity. An Absurdist Celebration of plotlessness, edited by Jaydeep Sarkar, New Delhi: Delta Publication, 2013, ISBN 9788192624402.
