= Ata Pata Laapata =

2012 Indian film directed by Rajpal Yadav

- Theatrical release poster
- Directed by: Rajpal Yadav
- Written by: Mohd. Saleem
- Produced by: Radha Yadav
- Starring: SRK; Asrani; Om Puri; Ashutosh Rana; Manoj Joshi; Govind Namdev; Dara Singh; Vikram Gokhale; Vijay Raaz; Satyadev Dubey
- Narrated by: Rajpal Yadav
- Cinematography: Arvind Kumar
- Edited by: Aseem Sinha
- Music by: Original Songs: Sujeet Chaubey, Amod Bhatt, Rajpal Yadav, Sukhwinder Singh; Background Score: Aadesh Shrivastav
- Production company: Shree Naurang Godavari Entertainment Ltd.
- Release date: 2 November 2012
- Running time: 128 minutes
- Country: India
- Language: Hindi

Ata Pata Laapata (transl. Whereabouts missing) is a 2012 Indian Hindi-language musical satire film directed by Rajpal Yadav and produced by his wife Radha Yadav. Rajpal makes his directorial debut with the film and also plays the protagonist who enlists the help of law when his house goes missing from the constructed site, and finds himself suspected instead. Other than Yadav, the film stars the ensemble cast of Asrani, Om Puri, Ashutosh Rana, Manoj Joshi, Govind Namdev, Dara Singh, Vikram Gokhale, Vijay Raaz and Satyadev Dubey. Released on 2 November 2012, the film was a commercial failure and panned for its script.

== Plot ==
Manav Chaturvedi (Rajpal Yadav) files a police complaint of robbery where the entire house has gone missing. Chaturvedi is suspected of abolishing his own house in order to claim the insurance money. The case comes to the media's attention and soon becomes a topic of everyone's interest. Due to media pressure, authorities are forced to acknowledge the robbery. The film focuses on the loopholes of governance, bureaucracy, and the attitude of people in power.

== Cast ==
- Rajpal Yadav as Manav Chaturvedi & the narrator
- Amit Behl as a lawyer
- Asrani as Session Court lawyer
- Om Puri
- Mukesh Bhatt
- Mushtaq Khan
- Razak Khan
- Sharat Saxena
- Vivek Shauq
- Neeraj Sood
- Ashutosh Rana as Satyaprakash Choubey
- Mukesh Tiwari
- Manoj Joshi as Jagrut Jaganath
- Govind Namdeo as BMC Commissioner
- Dara Singh as S. P. Shastri
- Vikram Gokhale as S.P.
- Vijay Raaz as Munshiji
- Satyadev Dubey as Pagla Baba
- Nalneesh Neel as Bakra
- Arun Shekhar as Tiger

== Production ==
This film was Rajpal Yadav's directorial debut. He also acted as music director and contributed to screenplay and dialogue. Yadav's small-budget films (including this one) were produced by Radha Yadav (Rajpal's wife) under the "Shree Naurang Godavari Entertainment Ltd." banner, which was named after Rajpal's parents. Sujeet Choubey, Amod Bhatt, and Sukhwinder Singh were the music directors for this film. The songs were written by Sameer and sung by Sukhwinder Singh.

=== Casting ===
The film had a huge star-cast of about 175 actors, the majority of whom had no prior acting experience in films. The ensemble cast included veteran Dara Singh and Satyadev Dubey, for both of whom this was their last film. Both died before the release of the film.

== Release ==
The music of the film was launched by Amitabh Bachchan on 22 September 2012. The film was originally set to release in October 2012, but its release was stayed by Delhi High Court after a local businessman M. G. Agarwal filed a cheating case against director Rajpal Yadav. Agarwal alleged that Yadav had taken ₹5 crore as loan from him for the film and signed an agreement with Agarwal-owned Murli Projects for the music and overall production of the movie. He alleged that Yadav went ahead and independently released the music and all the cheques Yadav gave to Agarwal bounced. The film was finally released on 2 November 2012.

== Reception ==
The Times of India criticised the film for weak script, repetitiveness, preachiness and lack of clarity. Songs were criticised for acting only as fillers without adding anything to the story. Navbharat Times criticised the movie for being noisy, weak script and inability of Yadav to make good use of the huge star cast. Commercially the film failed at the box office.
