= Eashwar Mime Co. =

Hindi drama film

Eashwar Mime Co. is a Hindi drama film directed and produced by Shyamanand Jalan based on Dibyendu Palit's short story, Mukabhinoy. This film was released on 26 November 2005 under the banner of National Film Development Corporation. Though the movie did not receive a commercial release, it was screened at Durban International Film Festival, the 3 Continents Festival and the Kolkata Film Festival.

== Plot ==
This is the story of a megalomaniac mime director named Eashwar. He is the owner, manager and director of Eashwar Mime Co.

== Cast ==
- Vijay Tendulkar
- Ashish Vidyarthi as Eashwar
- Pawan Malhotra as Chitrarth Roy
- Prem Prakash Modi
