= Dibyendu Palit =

Bengali writer (1939–2019)

- Born: 5 March 1939; Bhagalpur, Bengal Presidency, British India (now in Bihar, India)
- Died: 3 January 2019 (aged 79); Jadavpur, Kolkata, West Bengal, India
- Education: Jadavpur University - M.A. in (Comparative literature)
- Occupations: novelist, poet, short-story writer
- Spouse: Kalyani Palit
- Children: 1
- Writing career
- Language: Bengali
- Years active: 1955–2019
- Notable works: Anubhav; Dheu
- Notable awards: Sahitya Akademi Award (1998)

Dibyendu Palit (Bengali pronunciation: [/dibʲendu/]; 5 March 1939 – 3 January 2019) was a Bengali novelist, poet, and short-story writer. His oeuvre consists of some forty novels, twenty-five short-story collections, ten poetry collections and several essays. He was senior assistant-editor of Anandabazar Patrika, until his retirement in 2000. He received the 1990 Bankim Purashkar for the novel Dheu, and in 1998 won the Sahitya Akademi Award for Anubhav.

His literary career began with the short story Chhandapatan published in the Sunday supplement of Anandabazar Patrika in 1955, and with Niyam appearing in Desh the next year.

== Biography ==
Dibyendu Palit was born in Bhagalpur, Bihar, to Bagalacharan and Niharbala Palit. He grew up amid the violence of post-Partition riots—an experience that later influenced much of his writing. He developed an early interest in literature and, while in college, won first prize in a short story competition organized by Bangiya Sahitya Parishad. There, he met Banaful, the jury president, who encouraged him to keep writing.

After his father died in 1958, Palit moved to Kolkata under financial strain. He studied comparative literature at Jadavpur University, where he met Buddhadeb Bose, with whom he later formed a close relationship. That same year, he published his first novel, Sindhubaroan, followed by his debut short-story collection, Shit-Grishmer Smriti, in 1960.

In 1961, he joined the Hindustan Standard as a sub-editor. His 1967 story Madhyarat drew praise, with critic Pranabendu Dasgupta saying it "warrants our attention." In 1970, he published his first poetry collection, Rajar Bari Onek Dure. The Ananda Puraskar followed in 1984. In 1987, he became senior assistant editor at Anandabazar Patrika, where he remained until retiring in 2000. He also briefly edited the literary section of Sangbad Pratidin.

== Writing style ==
Several of Palit's stories explore existential crisis, earthly suffering, and quiet lament. Yet, as critic Subarna Basu observes, he brings "remarkable depth" and "philosophical clarity" to the way people still find solace. In Oboidha (lit. 'Illicit'), he focuses solely on the female perspective, contrary to the conventional narratives of adultery. Jeena Banerjee, his protagonist, voices her frustrations and contradictions—caught between physical intimacy and emotional detachment—without guilt or apology. Palit avoids moral commentary, instead tracing a woman's quiet assertion of independence.

== Personal life ==
In 1964, Dibyendu married Kalyani Palit. Their only son, Amitendu Palit, is an economist and officer of the Indian Economic Service (IES).

Palit died in Kolkata on 3 January 2019, at the age of 79.

== In popular culture ==
In 2005, Shyamanand Jalan directed Eashwar Mime Co., adapted from Palit's story Mukhabhinoy and scripted by Vijay Tendulkar. The film, starring Ashish Vidyarthi and Pawan Malhotra, follows a travelling mime troupe through the eyes of a writer. Though not commercially released, it was screened at festivals in Durban, Nantes, and Kolkata.

== Selected works ==
=== Collection of stories ===
- 1960: Shit-Grismer Smriti
- 1982: Mukabhinoy
- 1983: Chilekotha
- 1984: Sukre Shoni
- 1973: Munnir songe kichukkhon
- 1984: Alamer nijer Bari
- 1988: Ruth o onnanyo galpo
- 1988: Mukhguli
- 1993: Dui Nari
- 2001: Araler Aynay

=== Novels ===
- Anusaran
- Swapner Bhitor
- Dheu
- Sahojhoddha
- Sabuj Gandho
- AEka
- Bristir Pore
- Binidro
- The Golden Life

== Awards and honours ==
- 1984: Ananda Purashkar
- 1986: Ramkumar Bhualka Puraskar
- 1990: Bankim Puraskar
- 1998: Sahitya Akademi Award
- 2016: Syed Mustafa Siraj Akademi Award
