= Preeti Sagar =

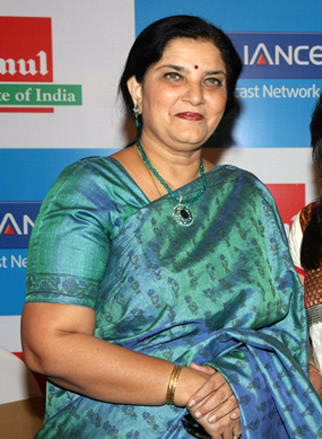
- Preeti Sagar in 2012

Background information
- Born: India
- Genres: Pop, Indian classical music
- Occupations: Singer, playback singer
- Years active: 1969–present

Preeti Sagar is a former Bollywood playback singer who won the Filmfare Award for Best Female Playback Singer for the song "Mero Gaam Katha Parey" from Manthan in 1978 and for the hit song "My Heart is Beating" from Julie (1975).

== Career ==
Preeti is an accomplished singer with basic classical knowledge in music and singing. She started her singing career when she was asked to sing jingles for commercials by Shyam Benegal.

She shot to instant fame with her English song My Heart is Beating in Julie. She won a special Filmfare award for the same.

She is also well known for her contribution in the children's entertainment and education industry. She worked with Saregama to create audio versions of several children's nursery rhyme collections in Hindi and English. She also created a Fairy Tales series.

She now runs her own production company called Angela Films which does advertising, short films and feature-film dubbing. In the 1990s, Angela Films produced the hit children's TV show, Phulwari Bachchon Ki. She was part of jury of the 52nd National Film Awards.

In 2010, she sang the UIDAI ID project's official theme song, Yeh Hai Meri Pehchaan.

== Personal life ==
Preeti Sagar lives in Mumbai with her husband and two daughters. Her father, actor Moti Sagar, cousin of actor Motilal and singer Mukesh, appeared in films like Apna Ghar, Burma Road, and Chhoti Chhoti Baatein in 1950s and '60s. Preeti has two sisters Neeti, who wrote the song "Mero Gaam Katha Pare" and Namita Sagar, who anchored Phulwari Bachchon Ki (1992–1999), produced by her father.

== Popular Tracks ==
- Julie (1975) – My heart is beating
- Nishant (1975) – Piya Baaj Pyaala Piya Jaaye Na
- Manthan (1976) – Mero Gaam Kathyawade
- Bhoomika (1977) – Tumhaare Bin Jee Naa Laage
- Kalyug (1981) – What's your problem
- Mandi (1983) – Shamsher Barahna Maang Ghazab
- Locket (1986) – Jo Bhi Kehna Sach Hain Kehna
