= Mangesh Tendulkar =

Indian cartoonist and caricaturist

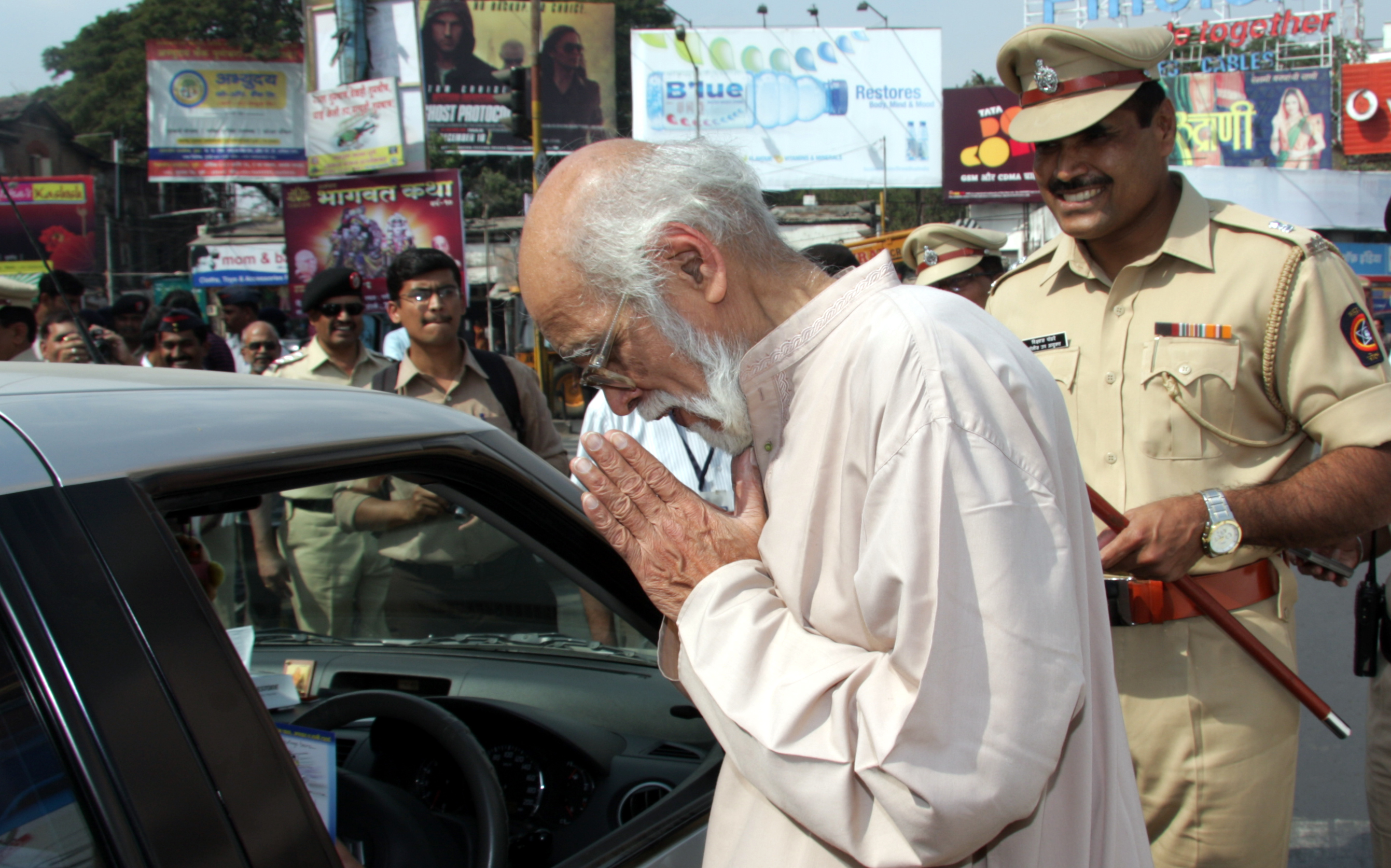
- Mangesh Tendulkar with DCP (Traffic) Vishwas Pandhare during traffic awareness campaign in Pune
- Born: Mangesh; 1934; Kolhapur, British Raj
- Died: 10 July 2017 (aged 83); Pune, Maharashtra, India
- Known for: Cartoonist, caricaturist
- Website: www.Mangeshtendulkar.com

Mangesh Tendulkar (1934 – 10 July 2017) was an Indian artist, cartoonist, and humourist. He wrote cartoons for magazines. He was the brother of playwright and screenwriter Vijay Tendulkar.

== Life ==
Tendulkar was a caricaturist in 1954. He was instrumental in creating traffic awareness in Pune city and gave supported Pune traffic police. He personally stood on Karve road to create awareness regarding the traffic for last 17 years.

The Automotive Research Association of India (ARAI) used Mangesh’s talents to draw images in their drive to promote road safety. In a 100 cartoon seriess he set forth his concerns about the city and the preservation of Pune’s once-leafy environs with good-humoured, gentle skepticism. Besides his prolific cartoons, Tendulkar also authored collections of satirical sketches accompanied by caricatures in works like Bhuichakra and Sunday Mood. He documented Pune’s theatre scene in incisive articles and books.

He started sketching caricatures in his 70s and continued until his death.

== Books ==
Tendulkar’s book Cartoons was published in 2001.

- Cartoons
- Bhuichakra भुईचक्र
- Sunday Mood संडे मूड : (५३ लेख आणि जवळपास तेवढीच व्यंगचित्रे असलेले पुस्तक)
- Atikraman अतिक्रमण
- Kuni Pampato Ajun Kalokh कुणी पंपतो अजून काळोख
- Bittesha Dakesha ’बित्तेशां?’ ‘दांकेशां!’

Apart from that, he wrote magazine pieces regarding cartoons:

Pieces
Name	Magazine	Type	Year
Chukatitlya Atmyala	Aawaj	Diwali Ank	2003
Vyangachitratun Samvad Sadhtanana	Chatra Prabodhan	Diwali Ank	
Mobile Free	Shri Deeplaxmi	Diwali Ank	
Mazya Govyachya Bhomit	Gomantak	Diwali Ank	
Vyangachitra Hech Pahile Prem	Grahakhit	Diwali Ank	
Vyangachitranchi Bhasha	Kutumb Kautumbik	Diwali Ank	
Vyangachitre Hi Kala Nahich	Kistrim	Diwali Ank	

== Exhibitions ==
In total, 89 exhibitions accepted Tendulkar's cartoons.

Exhibitions
Date	Place
Balgandharva Kala Dalan, Pune	04.01.1997
Rajshree Shahu Kaladalan, Kolhapur	26.01.2001
Balgandharva Kala Dalan, Pune	
Balgandharva Kala Dalan, Pune	31.12.1999
Balgandharva Kala Dalan, Pune	
Balgandharva Kala Dalan, Pune	24.04.1999
Paud Road, Pune	09.07.1999
Balgandharva Kala Dalan, Pune	
Balgandharva Kala Dalan, Pune	
Sarvajanik Vachnalaya, Nasik	
Maratha art gallery, Satara	28.04.2001
Lokmanya Tilak Library	
Rajashri Shahu Academy, Kolhapur	26.12.2001
Sawarkar Sabhagruha, Mumbai Dadar	13.11.1999
Balgandharva Kala Dalan, Pune	30.12.2000
da Sankul, Mumbai VilleParle	29.01.2000
Balgandharva Kala Dalan, Pune	01.02.2002
Hotel Mhawra, Mumbai Goregaon	21.12. 2001
Balgandharva Kala Dalan, Pune	
Balgandharva Kala Dalan, Pune	09.11.2003
Yashwantrao Chavan Kala Dalan, Pune	Dec. 2003
Balgandharva Kala Dalan, Pune	23.12.2001
Kala Academy, Goa	09.02.2004

== Awards ==
- 1980 - President’s medal
- 1993 - Marathi Natya Parishad Award
- 2003 - Pulotsav award
- 1984 - Active theatre award
- Award from Kamayani Pune
- Award from Pune Police for cartoon on Traffic
- Award from Dnyaneshwar Vidhyapeeth
- Award from Samvad TV
- Award from Urja Kotwal Foods
- Award from Maayboli
- 2001 - Award in Kothrud Natya Sammelan
- 1994- Award from Mumbai Marathi Patrakar Sangh
- 2003 – Award from Muktachand

== Death ==
Mangesh Tendulkar died on 10 July 2017, in Pune at age 83. Tendulkar had been suffering from bladder cancer for three years and was admitted to Ruby Hall Clinic after complaining of pain. He developed a pulmonary embolism and died.
