= The Brown Heart =

English-language documentary-drama film

- Promotional poster
- Directed by: Dr. Nirmal Joshi; Dr. Renu Joshi
- Written by: Nirmal Joshi; Renu Joshi
- Produced by: Joshi Health Foundation; R Motion Pictures
- Starring: Nirmal Joshi; Renu Joshi; Naseeruddin Shah; Subhash Ghai; Daler Mehndi; Meghna Gulzar
- Cinematography: Yogendra Singh
- Production companies: Joshi Health Foundation; R Motion Pictures
- Distributed by: JioHotstar
- Release date: 3 May 2025
- Running time: 135 minutes
- Countries: India; United States
- Language: English

The Brown Heart is a 2025 English-language documentary-drama directed by Dr. Nirmal Joshi and Dr. Renu Joshi. The film investigates the rising incidence of early-onset heart disease among young South Asians in India, the United Kingdom, and the United States. It premiered on the streaming platform JioHotstar on 3 May 2025, and was produced as a nonprofit project under the Joshi Health Foundation, in collaboration with R Motion Pictures.

== Synopsis ==
The documentary follows physicians Nirmal and Renu Joshi as they travel across India, the UK, and the US to examine increasing rates of heart attacks among young South Asians. The film includes interviews with over 40 cardiologists and health experts, as well as personal accounts from individuals and families affected by heart disease.

The documentary highlights factors contributing to the trend, such as genetic predisposition, prevalence of diabetes and central obesity, dietary habits, and lifestyle elements including chronic stress and tobacco use. The film also features commentary from public figures including Naseeruddin Shah, Subhash Ghai, Daler Mehndi, and Meghna Gulzar. It addresses cultural misconceptions surrounding early symptoms of heart disease, such as mistaking chest discomfort for indigestion, and emphasizes the need for awareness and early screening.

The narrative references several high-profile cases of cardiac-related deaths, including those of singer Krishnakumar Kunnath and actor Puneeth Rajkumar, to underscore the relevance of the issue within South Asian communities.

== Production ==
The concept for The Brown Heart originated from the filmmakers' observations of heart disease trends within South Asian populations. Drs. Nirmal and Renu Joshi, both based in Pennsylvania, began developing the documentary in 2023. Filming took place across multiple cities in India, the United States, and the United Kingdom. The film was created as a nonprofit initiative through the Joshi Health Foundation and funded by philanthropic contributions. The cinematography was led by Yogendra Singh, who also served as associate director. The filmmakers compiled over 100 hours of footage, later edited into a 135-minute feature. An extended four-part web series version was also produced for educational use.

== Release ==
The Brown Heart premiered on 3 May 2025, via JioHotstar and was simultaneously released on YouTube. The film is primarily in English, with select segments in South Asian languages.

== Reception ==
The Times of India rated the film 4.5 out of 5, describing it as "engaging and quietly alarming" for its presentation of both emotional narratives and medical insights. Reviewer Abhishek Srivastava noted the film prompts viewers to reflect on their lifestyle choices.

Joyce M. Davis of PennLive wrote that the film would be informative for both South Asian viewers and others seeking to better understand cardiovascular health.

== See also ==
- Cardiovascular disease
- Cardiac arrest
