= Bhumika (film) =

- "Bhumika" poster
- Directed by: Shyam Benegal
- Written by: Shyam Benegal, Girish Karnad, Satyadev Dubey (dialogue)
- Story by: Hansa Wadkar
- Based on: Sangtye Aika by Hansa Wadkar
- Produced by: Lalit M. Bijlani; Freni Variava
- Starring: Smita Patil; Amol Palekar; Anant Nag; Amrish Puri
- Cinematography: Govind Nihalani
- Edited by: Bhanudas Divakar; Ramnik Patel
- Music by: Vanraj Bhatia; Majrooh Sultanpuri; Vasant Dev (lyrics)
- Distributed by: Shemaroo Movies
- Release date: 11 November 1977 (India)
- Running time: 142 minutes
- Country: India
- Language: Hindi

Bhumika (English: Role or Character) is a 1977 Indian Hindi language film directed by Shyam Benegal. The film stars Smita Patil, Amol Palekar, Anant Nag, Naseeruddin Shah and Amrish Puri.

The film is broadly based on the Marathi-language memoirs, Sangtye Aika of the well-known Marathi stage and screen actress of the 1940s Hansa Wadkar, who led a flamboyant and unconventional life, and focuses on an individual's search for identity and self-fulfilment. Smita Patil gives a strong performance of transforming from a vivacious teenager to a wiser but deeply wounded middle-aged woman.

The film won two National Film Awards and Filmfare Best Movie Award. It was invited to Carthage Film Festival, Tunisia 1978, Chicago Film Festival, where it was awarded the Golden Plaque 1978, and 1986 Festival of Images, Algeria.

== Plot ==
Bhumika depicts the life of an actress, Usha, the granddaughter of a famous female singer of the traditional Devadasi community of Goa. Usha's mother is married to an abusive and alcoholic man. Following his early death, and over her mother's objections, Usha is taken to Bombay by family hanger-on Keshav Dalvi to audition as a singer in a Bombay studio: the first step in a process, watched approvingly by Usha's doting grandmother and with horror by her mother, that will eventually carry her to on-camera adolescent stardom, and to an ill-fated love marriage with Keshav. Usha's motives for stubbornly pursuing this relationship (culminating in a pre-marital pregnancy) with the unattractive and much older Keshav, who appears to have lusted after her since her childhood, are not spelled out. Presumably, she either feels indebted to him for his loyalty to her family (of which he frequently reminds her) and for her own worldly success; or simply views him as a means to escape her abusive home. She is also a headstrong woman who enjoys her acting career and is bent on challenging her uptight mother (who opposes the match because Keshav does not belong to their caste, just as she opposes cinema itself because of its presumed disrepute).

Once the two are wed, Usha is shocked to find Keshav continuing to act as her "business manager", arranging starring roles for her opposite heartthrob Rajan, who himself has (unrequited) love for her. Since Keshav's own business is unsuccessful, he remains entirely dependent on Usha's earnings – a fact that Keshav resents. He thus becomes both a jealous husband with a fragile ego and nasty temper, as well as a greedy pimp who compels his wife to take risqué work despite her dislike of her co-star and her protests that she "only wants to be a housewife" now that their daughter has been born. Not surprisingly, the relationship becomes increasingly poisoned, particularly by Keshav's suspicion (fed by star-magazine gossip) that she is having an affair with Rajan, which is partly true.

Verbally and physically abused by her husband and periodically obliged to live in a hotel, separated from her daughter and mother, the desperately unhappy Usha eventually instigates two unsatisfying liaisons: with the nihilistic and self-centered director Sunil Verma, with whom she plots a double-suicide (which he foils), and then with the wealthy businessman Vinayak Kale, who keeps her as a pampered mistress on his palatial estate. Here Usha briefly finds a kind of "respectability" as a de facto second wife, earning a measure of love and admiration from Kale's mother, son, and bedridden wife, but (as she learns one day when she tries to take the boy to a nearby fair) at the cost of even the most rudimentary freedom. Unable to abide by Kale's feudal patriarchal rules, she finds her only hope of escape in the intervention of her still-legitimate husband, the hated Keshav, who promptly brings her back to a Bombay festooned with billboards of her own face, and to the same drab hotel and lonely prospects. Kale's bitter wife remarks to Usha as the latter prepares to leave, "The beds change, the kitchens change. Men's masks change, but men don't change." Usha's daughter, now grown-up, invites Usha to live with her and her husband, but Usha refuses. The movie ends with Usha, alone in her hotel room, receiving a phone call from Rajan.

== Cast ==
- Smita Patil as Urvashi alias Usha
- Amol Palekar as Keshav Dalvi
- Anant Nag as Rajan
- Amrish Puri as Vinayak Kale
- Naseeruddin Shah as Sunil Verma
- Dina Pathak as Mrs. Kale, Vinayak's mother
- Kulbhushan Kharbanda as Film Producer Harilal
- Sulabha Deshpande as Shanta
- Kiran Vairale as Sushma Dalvi
- Mohan Agashe as Siddharth Sutar
- Benjamin Gilani as actor Mohan playing Mughal prince in song 'Saawan ke din aaye'
- Abishek
- Baby Rukhsana as Young Usha
- B. V. Karanth as Usha's father
- Kusum Deshpande as Shanta's mother
- Rekha Sabnis as Mrs.Yashwant Kale
- Baby Bitto as young Sushma
- G. M. Durrani as music teacher
- Sudarshan Dheer as dance director (he is also the choreographer of this movie)
- Master Abhitab as Dinu
- Sunila Pradhan as actress Ms.Bala the 'Princess'
- Om Puri as stage actor as 'Evil King'
- Savita Bajaj as Basanti

== Production ==
The film was based on the autobiography of the doyenne of Marathi theatre and cinema Hansa Wadkar during the 1940s and 50s. The biography was told to journalist Arun Sadhu, who used the title of the hit musical, Sangtye Aika (1959) or " "Listen, and I'll Tell."

The film was set in the Maharashtra region. Benegal's previous films were based in the Hyderabad region, and since he was unfamiliar with the region, he roped in screenwriter and playwright Girish Karnad to co-write the script. Another noted theatre director and playwright Satyadev Dubey wrote the dialogues. The story moves back and forth across flashbacks to the early life of Wadkar. Apart from the non-linear narrative, the film also employed the film within a film device.

Lead actress, 22-year-old Smita Patil who found the role daunting initially, went on to win the Best Actress Award for her performance. Today it is considered one of the best performances of her career.

== Music ==
The song 'Baju re Mondar' is sung by two stalwart vocalists of Hindustani classical music, Saraswati Rane, daughter of Ustad Abdul Karim Khan of Kirana gharana, and Meena Fatherpekar, her granddaughter.

All music is composed by Vanraj Bhatia.

No.	Title	Lyrics	Singer(s)	Length
1.	"Baaju Re Mondar Baaju Re" (Part 1)	Vasant Dev	Saraswati Rane, Meena Fatharpekar
2.	"Ghat Ghat Mein Ram Ramaiya"	Vasant Dev	Firoz Dastur
3.	"Mera Ziskila Balam Na Aaya"	Vasant Dev	Preeti Sagar
4.	"Meri Zindagi Ki Kashti Tere Pyaar Ka Sahara"	Raja Mehdi Ali Khan	Chandru Aatma
5.	"Saawan Ke Din Aaye Sajanwa Aan Milo"	Majrooh Sultanpuri	Bhupinder Singh, Preeti Sagar
6.	"Tumhare Bina Jee Na Laage Ghar Mein" (Raga Tilak Kamod)	Vasant Dev	Preeti Sagar

== Awards and nominations ==
Year	Nominee / work	Award	Result			
1977	Smita Patil	National Film Award for Best Actress	Won			
1977	Satyadev Dubey, Shyam Benegal, Girish Karnad	National Film Award for Best Screenplay	Won			
1978	Lalit M. Bijlani, Freni Variava	Filmfare Award for Best Film				
1978	Amol Palekar	Filmfare Special Award		Smita Patil	Filmfare Award for Best Actress	Nominated
