= Ghulam Abbas (writer) =

Pakistani writer (1909–1982)

- غلام عباس
- Born: 17 November 1909; Amritsar, British India (now in Punjab, India)
- Died: November 2, 1982 (aged 71); Karachi, Pakistan
- Occupations: Writer, magazine editor, translator
- Organization(s): All India Radio, during World War II
- Known for: Short story author
- Notable work: Jaaray ki Chandani; Anandi; Kan Ras; Dhanak; Al-Ḥamra ke Afsane; Overcoat; Jazeera-e- Sukhanwaran; Mohabbat Roti Hai; Jala Watan
- Awards: Sitara-e-Imtiaz in 1967

Ghulam Abbas (Urdu: غلام عباس; 17 November 1909 – 2 November 1982) was a short story writer from Pakistan.

== Early life ==
Ghulam Abbas was born on the 17th of November 1909 in Amritsar, Punjab, British India into a Pashtun family of the Sadozai tribe tracting its roots to Afghanistan. His family shifted to Lahore when he was still a child. He got his Intermediate degree as late as 1944 from the Punjab University because he began to earn a living as a writer early on and couldn't complete his education.

Ghulam Abbas could speak Urdu, Punjabi, English and Persian.

== Career ==
=== Early work as editor and translator ===
In his early career, Ghulam Abbas worked as a publisher with Maulvi Mumtaz Ali, and specialized in the translation of literature for children.

=== Radio and move to Pakistan ===
In 1938, Ghulam Abbas moved to Delhi, becoming the editor of All India Radio’s magazine Awaaz. Following the 1947 Partition, he'd work for Radio Pakistan, initiating its magazine Aahung, and would work with both Radio Pakistan and BBC London over the next years.

=== Established author ===
Ghulam Abbas began to publish his original works, mostly short stories, in the 1930s, and in 1960 received the Adamjee Literary Award for his work Jaaray ki Chaandni.

== Personal life ==
=== Relationships and family ===
His first wife was named Zakira and he had five children, four daughters and a son. His second wife was a Greek-Scottish-Romanian woman named Christian Vlasto (renamed Zainab) with whom he had a son and three daughters.

=== Hobbies ===
Ghulam Abbas had a large private library with some 20,000 books on all subjects, while his other hobbies included playing music, having mastered musical instruments such as the guitar, the violin and the flute, as well playing chess, including having competitions with fellow writers such as Noon Meem Rashid.

== Themes and writing style ==
Ghulam Abbas has written stories, plays, and poems for children, but his primary focus is fiction. He holds a prominent position in modern Urdu fiction. His works draw plots from everyday life, with characters grounded in reality. His writing features simple language, lively narration, and technically polished storytelling. While his stories may appear simple at first, they often reveal deeper layers of meaning upon closer reading. For example, his story Overcoat appears straightforward on the surface but conveys multiple layers of social significance.

Ghulam Abbas's characters are not pre-planned, but he picks up a few ordinary people from some class and corner of their society and environment and then presents them with the whole truths of their lives and all the good and bad details of their surroundings. They make their characters into ideals, not consciously convincing them to put a stamp of good on their personality, but in the world, as is usually the case, that good is often in decline and evil is rampant. Ghulam Abbas presents these things in exactly the same way. There is no extremism or idealism here, but the reflection of human nature is found in his works. There are colors of life in his art. When one gets a sense of problems and life he brings is such a deep analysis, that they bring the truth reader in front of the reader in the same way as in reality. He does not care about their egos. Rather, he brings forth the secrets of life.

== Awards and recognition ==
He received the Sitara-i-Imtiaz, the third-highest civilian award of Pakistan, in 1967.

== Books ==
- Jazeera-e-Sukhanwaran (published 1937)
- Anandi (Marketplace) (a Bollywood film Mandi (1983) was based on this Ghulam Abbas's short story)
- The Women's Quarter and Other Stories from Pakistan (published 1984)
- Intikhab Ghulam Abbas (Selection of Stories by Ghulam Abbas) (compiled by Asif Farrukhi)
- Gondni wala Takiya Novel
