= Turning Point (1991 TV series) =

Indian television series

Turning Point is a weekly science magazine programme that aired on DD National in 1991. The show won several awards.

The script and direction was by Neelabh Kaul and Indraneel Kaul. It was co-produced by Doordarshan and Vyeth Television. The presenter was Girish Karnad, with special appearances by Yash Pal. Actor Naseeruddin Shah, classical dancer Mallika Sarabhai, and director Mahesh Bhatt along with Kabir Bedi also hosted some episodes.
