= Evam Indrajit =

1962 play by Badal Sarkar

Evam Indrajit (also Ebong Indrajit depending on the transliteration from Bangla) (Bangla: এবং ইন্দ্রজিত; in English: And Indrajit) is the most celebrated work of Indian dramatist and theater director Badal Sarkar. It was originally written in Bengali in the year 1962 and performed by the theatre group 'Shatabdi' formed by the writer. Ebong Indrajit became a landmark in the Indian theatres and was translated into many languages over the years. Dr Pratibha Agarwal translated it into Hindi during 1970. Later in the year 1974 it was translated into English by Girish Karnad and published by Oxford University Press.

Ebong Indrajit is a play about the mediocre class. It is a conversation between the writer and the protagonist Indrajit, who is introduced as 'and Indrajit' because he is part of society rather than having an identity of his own. It is perceived as an Absurd Play such as Eugène Ionesco's Amédée or Samuel Beckett's Waiting for Godot in the context that it portrays the emptiness and repetitiveness in the pattern and conformity of the modern society. The play subtly points towards Sartrean Existentialism. It denotes that life is a circle with no end, it ends where it begins, it is an endless road.

== Synopsis ==
The first act of the play begins with a writer, who is seen to be frustrated without any content to write his story. His mother comes onto the stage, asking him to eat dinner, unable to understand the depth of his struggle. He is inspired by Manasi and decides to write about four people among the audience. They are Amal Kumar Bose, Vimal Kumar Ghosh, Kamal Kumar Sen, and Nirmal Kumar. The name of the fourth person is not acceptable to the writer who asks him to reveal his real name. After a little persuasion, he states his name to be Indrajit and when inquired about him hiding his identity, he states he is afraid. He says he is scared to bring unrest by breaking the norm. Earlier that was not the case, but the loss of childhood and coming of age changed his priorities from happiness to peace. As the narration goes he is revealed to be a common man, born, schooling, work, every aspect of his life reoccurs in the same place. A scene is depicted where the same conversation is repeated, but only Indrajit realizes. Indrajit talks to the writer and reveals his anguish towards the norms of society and his desperate dreams to go away from this world. But the thought of his mother binds him, relationships and emotions stop him. The narration then moves to the writer, who is a constant part of his plot and he wishes to write about the lives of these characters with a heroine Manasi. Then he asks Indrajit about his love interest in Manasi. He tries to correct the name in the beginning but then accepts it to be Manasi. Indrajit starts to talk about his relationship with Manasi, with whom he could talk and find meaning in those talks. Their relation is like every other relation. At a point, they talk about the rules that stop women and give freedom to men. Indrajit's rebel character asks her to disobey the rules and when she refuses, he questions people's nature of worshipping the rules. His anger towards the rules gives a context to the Biblical reference to the forbidden Fruit of Knowledge, that reveals the absurdity behind these rules to him. The next scene shows the original four characters waiting to go for an interview. They were asked to be there at eleven, while the interviewer came one hour late. A few minutes later they are joined by the writer, who had two interviews that clashed. He tells them his problems, after his marriage and his urgency to get a job because he married against his father's wishes and has also bought a flat. Every scene breaks off with Indrajit's mother asking him to eat, which shows the connection of the writer to his character.

The second act of the play occurs after a break of seven years. The characters Amal, Vimal and Kamal have settled down to the middle-class life, with a job and family. All of them have a life where they perform the same task in the office, filing papers, stamping files and organizing files. They do not have a break from this routine. Here again, this steady and futile lifestyle suffocates Indrajit who wants something outside all these customs. He is searching for something outside the real world. Also, he has not married yet because Manasi wants more time and later he decides to go abroad. Realizing his search is in vain, exhausted him and he decides to accept his fate and walks away from his dreams once again.

The third act of the play reveals Indrajit's vision through a letter the writer receives. Indrajit writes about the life that goes in circles wherever he is and the worst part is that he knows about the world that goes round and round. At a certain point in his life, he pulls at the rope of hope to find a meaning to life but ends with a rope that is bitten off. He is then presented on stage with an idealistic approach to life. He cannot make any sense of the things he has achieved in life and have thoughts of dying unable to find faith in life. When Manasi asks the writer about his story, he says he is at a point where the writer cannot continue, neither can he kill him nor can he put Indrajit into a plot that matters. The writer is again stuck like he was at the beginning without a story. Indrajit comes to the stage and tells the writer that he married Manasi, but the writer does not agree. But it is true in his concept of life because life has taught him, that there is not just one Manasi but many. It has made Indrajit one among Amal, Vimal and Kamal, just an ordinary man. He does meet his old friend Manasi and tells her how there is no escape from this life of sorrow. Finally, he accepts the shackles of society and names himself 'Nirmal Kumar Rey' - an ordinary man with ordinary ambitions and ordinary life. Recall that this is the exact name the writer does not accept at the beginning of the play.

Towards the end, we see Indrajit and Manasi (his childhood friend and cousin) at their designated spot - near a tree in an empty plot of land. Indrajit is now mature, but the nagging question of "why" still bothers him. He wants to know why we do the things we do, the way we do them. He wonders aloud at the pointlessness of walking a path with no beginning, no end, and most importantly no meaning. It is then the Myth of Sisyphus is invoked in the storyline, with the writer explaining to Indrajit the pointlessness of Sisyphus's condition. It is here that both - Indrajit and the reader - finally have a solution to the problem of life. The solution is to accept the pointlessness and the absurdity of life, and yet carry on with it. When there is a path, you have to tread on it. That itself is the meaning of life as per the writer.
