= Mandi (1983 film) =

- Movie poster for Mandi
- Directed by: Shyam Benegal
- Screenplay by: Satyadev Dubey; Shama Zaidi; Shyam Benegal
- Story by: Ghulam Abbas
- Based on: Aanandi by Ghulam Abbas
- Starring: Shabana Azmi; Smita Patil; Naseeruddin Shah; Amrish Puri; Kulbhushan Kharbanda; Saeed Jaffrey; Om Puri
- Cinematography: Ashok Mehta
- Music by: Vanraj Bhatia
- Distributed by: Blaze Entertainment
- Release date: 1983 (India)
- Running time: 167 minutes
- Country: India
- Language: Hindi

Mandi (English: Market Place) is a 1983 Hindi-language film directed by Shyam Benegal. Based on a classic Urdu short story Aanandi by writer Ghulam Abbas, the film narrates the story of a brothel, situated in the heart of a city, an area that some politicians want for its prime locality. The film is a satirical comedy on politics and prostitution, and stars Shabana Azmi, Smita Patil, Ratna Pathak Shah and Naseeruddin Shah among others. Ratna Pathak Shah made her Bollywood debut with this film.

The film won the 1984 National Film Award for Best Art Direction for Nitish Roy. It was selected at Indian Panorama at Filmostav, Bombay 1984, and was invited to the Los Angeles Exposition (FILMEX), the Hong Kong International Film Festival 1984, and London Film Festival 1983.

== Plot ==
For years, an aging Rukmini Bai has been the Madame of a brothel in Hyderabad, India. The women in the brothel live in harmony. Rukmini Bai takes pride in the talent of her women, especially Zeenat, who is a classical singer, and Basanti, who is a classical dancer. Rukmini Bai is quite possessive about the virginal Zeenat and does not let her get into prostitution. She is protective of her from the customers who wish to deflower Zeenat.

One day Rukmini Bai learns that she now has a new landlord Mr. Gupta, whose daughter Malti is to marry Mr. Aggarwal's son, Sushil, shortly. Given the finesse of Zeenat and Basanti, Mr. Gupta invites Rukmini Bai with her women to perform at his daughter's engagement ceremony. During the performance, Sushil is smitten by Zeenat's beauty and approaches her in the dressing room. Zeenat also gets attracted to Sushil. Meanwhile, it is shown that the City Councillor, Shantidevi, who also runs the Women's Organisation of the town is averse to Rukmini Bai and her doings. In a Municipal Committee meeting, she proposes that the brothel should be moved out of town, in order to protect the town from getting corrupted. The committee agrees to her demands and Rukmini Bai and her women are forced to relocate to the outskirts of the city which happens to be near the Dargah of Baba Karak Shah. This attracts a lot of people, and Rukmini Bai's brothel starts thriving.

In the meantime, Rukmini Bai gets to know about the budding love between Zeenat and Sushil and forbids Zeenat from going ahead with the relationship. She reveals that Zeenat is the illegitimate child of Mr. Aggarwal and another prostitute, and Rukmini Bai had kept it a secret for years, in order to save Mr. Aggarwal's reputation. This makes Zeenat and Sushil half-siblings and renders their romantic relationship incestuous.

Further complications set in when Sushil refuses to marry Malti and runs away from his house in order to pursue Zeenat. He asks Zeenat to elope with him in search of a better existence and Zeenat accepts his proposal. The whole brothel is in a state of panic when news of Zeenat's elopement breaks out. Rukmini Bai and Aggarwal go in search of the youngsters. However, along the way, Zeenat is overcome by guilt as she is aware of their biological relationship and thus, runs away from Sushil as well. Sushil is heartbroken. Rukmini Bai too is unable to come to terms with the news of Zeenat's disappearance. She is sobbing in her brothel and instead of getting sympathy, she is rebuked by Nadira, a prostitute who works for her. She asks Rukmini Bai to leave the brothel as the women do not need her anymore and can run the brothel on their own.

Rukmini Bai is in a state of shock and with a heavy heart, she quits the brothel with her faithful helper Tungrus. On their way, they stop for water. While looking for water, Tungrus accidentally comes across a Shiv Lingam. He calls out to Rukmini Bai and they both pray to the lingam for a better future. Just then, they see Phoolmani, a former brothel woman, running towards them. Rukmini Bai is delighted at the sight of Phoolmani and thanks the Almighty.

== Cast ==
- Shabana Azmi as Rukmini Bai
- Smita Patil as Zeenat
- Naseeruddin Shah as Tungrus
- Amrish Puri as Darvish/Fakir
- Kulbhushan Kharbanda as Mr. Gupta
- Saeed Jaffrey as Mayor Aggarwal
- Om Puri as Ramgopal
- Sreela Majumdar as Phoolmani
- Neena Gupta as Basanti
- Gita Siddharth as Shanti Devi
- Sunila Pradhan as Mrs. Gupta
- Soni Razdan as Nadira
- Anita Kanwar as Parweena
- Ratna Pathak Shah as Malti
- Pankaj Kapur as Shantidevi's assistant
- K. K. Raina as Shrikant
- Satish Kaushik as Councillor
- Khokha Mukherjea
- Athar Nawaz
- Harish Patel as Policeman
- Ila Arun as Kamli
- Annu Kapoor as The Doctor
- Aditya Bhattacharya as Sushil
- Ashay Chitre

== Soundtrack ==
The lyrics of the film's songs are by Mir Taqi Mir, Bahadur Shah Zafar, Insha, Makhdoom Mohiuddin and Sarwar Danda with music composed by Vanraj Bhatia.

Vocals were provided by Asha Bhosle for Smita Patil, and Preeti Sagar for Neena Gupta.

| Song | Singer |
|---|---|
| "Chubhti Hai" | Asha Bhosle |
| "Ishq Ke Sholay" | Asha Bhosle |
| "Zabanen Badalti Hain" | Asha Bhosle |
| "Shamsheer Barahana" | Preeti Sagar |

== Awards and nominations ==
| Year | Award | Category | Nominee(s) | Result |
|---|---|---|---|---|
| 1983 | National Film Awards | Best Art Direction | Nitish Roy | Won |
| 1984 | Filmfare Awards | Best Actress | Shabana Azmi | Nominated |
| 1984 | Filmfare Awards | Best Supporting Actress | Smita Patil | Nominated |
| 1984 | Filmfare Awards | Best Supporting Actor | Naseeruddin Shah | Nominated |
