= Vijay Tendulkar =

Indian playwright (1928-2008)

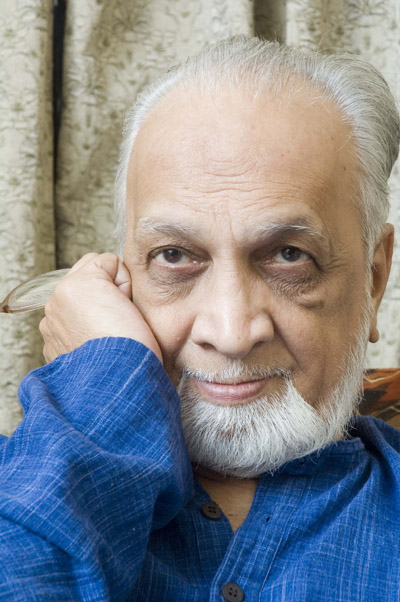
- Tendulkar in 2007
- Born: Vijay Tendulkar; 6 January 1928; British India
- Died: 19 May 2008 (aged 80); Pune, Maharashtra, India
- Spouse: Nirmala Tendulkar (d. 2001)
- Children: 3, including Priya Tendulkar
- Family: Mangesh Tendulkar (Brother)
- Awards: Padma Bhushan: 1984; Sangeet Nātak Akademi Fellowship: 1998; National Film Award for Best Screenplay: Manthan, 1977

Vijay Dhondopant Tendulkar (6 January 1928 – 19 May 2008) was an Indian playwright, movie and television writer, literary essayist, political journalist, and social commentator primarily in Marathi. His Marathi plays established him as a writer of plays with contemporary, unconventional themes. He is best known for his plays Shantata! Court Chalu Aahe (1967), Ghashiram Kotwal (1972), and Sakharam Binder (1972). Many of Tendulkar's plays derived inspiration from real-life incidents or social upheavals, which provide clear light on harsh realities. He has provided guidance to students studying "play writing" in US universities. Tendulkar was a dramatist and theatre personality in Maharashtra for over five decades.

He was awarded the Padma Bhushan in 1984, and Sangeet Nātak Akademi Fellowship, the highest award of Sangeet Natak Akademi in 1998. He also won National Film Award for Best Screenplay for Hindi film, Manthan, 1977.

== Early life ==
Vijay Dhondopant Tendulkar was born in a Gaud Saraswat Brahmin family on 6 January 1928 in Girgaon, Mumbai, Maharashtra, where his father held a clerical job and ran a small publishing business. The literary environment at home prompted young Vijay to take up writing. He wrote his first story at age six.

He grew up watching western plays and felt inspired to write plays himself. At age eleven, he wrote, directed, and acted in his first play.

At age 14, he participated in the 1942 Indian freedom movement, leaving his studies. The latter alienated him from his family and friends. Writing then became his outlet, though most of his early writings were of a personal nature, and not intended for publication. During this period, he participated in the activities of Nabajiban Sanghatana, a splinter communist group. He said that he liked the sense of sacrifice and discipline of the communists.

== Career ==
=== Early career ===
Tendulkar began his career writing for newspapers. He had already written a play, Amchyavar Kon Prem Karnar? (transl. Who is going to love me?), and he wrote the play, Grihastha (transl. The Householder), in his early 20s. The latter did not receive much recognition from the audience, and he vowed never to write again.

Breaking the vow, in 1956 he wrote Shrimant, which established him as a good writer. Shrimant jolted the conservative audience of the times with its radical storyline, wherein an unmarried young woman decides to keep her unborn child while her rich father tries to "buy" her a husband in an attempt to save his social prestige.

Tendulkar's early struggle for survival and living for some time in tenements (Chawl) in Mumbai provided him first-hand experience about the life of the urban lower middle class. He thus brought new authenticity to their depiction in Marathi theatre. Tendulkar's writings rapidly changed the storyline of modern Marathi theatre in the 1950s and the 60s, with experimental presentations by theatre groups like Rangayan. Actors in these theatre groups like Shriram Lagoo, Mohan Agashe, and Sulabha Deshpande brought new authenticity and power to Tendulkar's stories while introducing new sensibilities in Marathi theatre.

Tendulkar wrote the play Gidhade (transl. The Vultures) in 1961, but it was not produced until 1970. The play was set in a morally collapsed family structure and explored the theme of violence. In his following creations, Tendulkar explored violence in its various forms: domestic, sexual, communal, and political. Thus, Gidhade proved to be a turning point in Tendulkar's writings about the establishment of his own unique writing style.

Based on a 1956 short story, Die Panne (transl. The Traps) by Friedrich Dürrenmatt, Tendulkar wrote the play, Shantata! Court Chalu Aahe (transl. Silence! The Court is in Session). It was presented on the stage for the first time in 1967 and proved to be one of his finest works. Satyadev Dubey presented it in movie form in 1971 with Tendulkar's collaboration as the screenplay writer.

=== 1970s and 1980s ===
In his 1972 play, Sakharam Binder, Tendulkar dealt with the topic of domination of the male gender over the female. The main character, Sakharam, is a man devoid of ethics and morality, and professes not to believe in "outdated" social codes and conventional marriage. He accordingly uses the society for his pleasure. He regularly gives "shelter" to abandoned wives and uses them for his sexual gratification while remaining oblivious to the emotional and moral implications of his exploits. He justifies all his acts through claims of modern, unconventional thinking, and comes up with hollow arguments meant in fact to enslave women. Paradoxically, some of the women whom Sakharam had enslaved buy into his arguments and simultaneously badly want freedom from their enslavement.

In 1972, Tendulkar wrote another, even much more acclaimed play, Ghashiram Kotwal (transl. Officer Ghashiram), which dealt with political violence. The play is a political satire created as a musical drama set in 18th century Pune. It combined traditional Marathi folk music and drama with contemporary theatre techniques, creating a new paradigm for Marathi theatre. The play demonstrates Tendulkar's deep study of group psychology, and it brought him a Jawaharlal Nehru Fellowship (1974–75) for a project titled, "An Enquiry into the Pattern of Growing Violence in Society and Its Relevance to Contemporary Theatre". With over 6,000 performances thus far in its original and translated versions, Ghashiram Kotwal remains one of the longest-running plays in the history of Indian theatre.

Tendulkar wrote screenplays for the movies Nishant (1974), Akrosh (transl. The Outrage; 1980), and Ardh Satya (transl. The Half-Truth; 1984) which established him as an important "Chronicler of Violence" of the present. He has written eleven movies in Hindi and eight movies in Marathi. The latter include Samana (transl. The Confrontation; 1975), Simhaasan (transl. The Throne; 1979), and Umbartha (transl. The Threshold; 1981). The last one is a groundbreaking feature film on women's activism in India. It was directed by Jabbar Patel and stars Smita Patil and Girish Karnad.

=== 1990s to 2008 ===
In 1991, Tendulkar wrote a metaphorical play, Safar, and in 2001 he wrote the play, The Masseur. He next wrote two novels – Kadambari: Ek and Kadambari: Don – about sexual fantasies of an ageing man. In 2004, he wrote a single-act play, His Fifth Woman – his first play in the English language – as a sequel to his earlier exploration of the plight of women in Sakharam Binder. This play was first performed at the Vijay Tendulkar Festival in New York in October 2004.

In the 1990s, Tendulkar wrote an acclaimed TV series, Swayamsiddha, in which his daughter Priya Tendulkar, noted Television actress of 'Rajani' fame, performed in the lead role. His last screenplay was for Eashwar Mime Co. (2005), an adaptation of Dibyendu Palit's story, Mukhabhinoy, and directed by theatre director, Shyamanand Jalan and with Ashish Vidyarthi and Pawan Malhotra as leads.

== Family ==
He was the brother of acclaimed cartoonist and humourist Mangesh Tendulkar.

== Death ==
Vijay Tendulkar in late 2007 on a visit to Princeton, New Jersey, USA

Tendulkar died in Pune on 19 May 2008, battling the effects of the rare autoimmune disease myasthenia gravis.

Tendulkar's son Raja and wife Nirmala had died in 2001; his daughter Priya Tendulkar died the next year (2002) of a heart attack following a long battle with breast cancer.

== Comment on Post-Godhra communal carnage ==
Following the post-Godhra communal carnage in Gujarat in 2002, Tendulkar reacted by saying that "If I had a pistol, I would shoot [Gujarat Chief Minister] Narendra Modi". This reaction of Tendulkar had evoked mixed reactions, local Modi supporters burning his effigies while others lauded his remark.

Later, when he was asked if it was not strange that he, who was known as a strong voice against death penalty, had a death wish for Modi, Tendulkar had said that "it was spontaneous anger, which I never see as a solution for anything. Anger doesn't solve problems."

== Legacy ==
In his writing career spanning more than five decades, Tendulkar has written 27 full-length plays and 25 one-act plays. Several of his plays have proven to be Marathi theatre classics. His plays have been translated and performed in many Indian languages.

By providing insight into major social events and political upheavals during his adult life, Tendulkar became one of the most influential radical political voices in Maharashtra in recent times. He focused on political radicalism and political hegemony of the powerful and the hypocrisies in the Indian social mindset. His strong expression of human angst has resulted in his simultaneously receiving wide public acclaim and high censure from the orthodox and the officials.

Many of Tendulkar's plays derived inspiration from real-life incidents or social upheavals. Thus, the rise of Shiv Sena in Maharashtra in the 1970s was reflected in Tendulkar's Ghashiram Kotwal. The true story of a journalist who purchased of a woman from the rural sex industry to reveal police and political involvement in this trade, only to abandon the woman once he had no further need for her, is detailed in Tendulkar's Kamala. The play was later made into a film Kamla. The real-life story of an actress whose acting career got ruined after her same-sex affair became public knowledge inspired Tendulkar to write Mitrachi Goshta.

Tendulkar has translated nine novels, two biographies, and five plays by other authors into Marathi.

Besides the foregoing, Tendulkar's oeuvre includes a biography; two novels; five anthologies of short stories; 16 plays for children, including Bale Miltat (1960) and Patlachya Poriche Lagin (1965); and five volumes of literary essays and social criticism, including Ratrani (1971), Kowali Unhe (1971), and Phuge Sobanche (1974). All in all, Tendulkar's writings have contributed to a significant transformation of the modern literary landscape in Marathi and other Indian languages.

In 2005, a documentary titled Tendulkar Ani Himsa: Kal Ani Aj ("Tendulkar and Violence: Then and Now") with English subtitles (produced by California Arts Association – CalAA - directed by Atul Pethe) was released. In 2007, a short film about Tendulkar, Ankahin, (director Santosh Ayachit) was released.

== Awards ==
Tendulkar won Maharashtra State government awards in 1969 and 1972; and Maharashtra Gaurav Puraskar in 1999. He was honoured with the Sangeet Natak Akademi Award in 1970, and again in 1998 with the academy's highest award for "lifetime contribution", the Sangeet Natak Akademi Fellowship ("Ratna Sadasya"). In 1984, he received the Padma Bhushan award from the Government of India for his literary accomplishments.

In 1977, Tendulkar won the National Film Award for Best Screenplay for his screenplay of Shyam Benegals movie, Manthan (1976). He has written screenplays for many significant art movies, such as Nishant, Akrosh, Ardh Satya and Aghaat.

A comprehensive list of awards is given below:

- 1970 Sangeet Natak Akademi Award
- 1970 Kamaladevi Chattopadhyay Award
- 1977 National Film Award for Best Screenplay: Manthan
- 1981 Filmfare Best Screenplay Award: Aakrosh
- 1981 Filmfare Best Story Award: Aakrosh
- 1983 Filmfare Best Screenplay Award: Ardh Satya
- 1984 Padma Bhushan
- 1993 Saraswati Samman
- 1998 Sangeet Natak Akademi Fellowship
- 1999 Kalidas Samman
- 2001 Katha Chudamani Award Khamosh! Adalat Jari Ha
- 2006 The Little Magazine SALAM Award

== Bibliography ==
=== Novels ===
- Kadambari: Ek (Novel: One) (1996)
- Kadambari: Don (Novel: Two) (2005)

=== Short story anthologies ===
- Dwandwa (Duel) (1961)
- Phulapakhare (Butterflies) (1970)

=== Plays ===
- Gruhastha (Householder) (1947)
- Shrimant (The Rich) (1956)
- Manoos Nawache Bet (An Island Named 'Man') (1958)
- Thief! Police!
- Bale Miltat (1960)
- Gidhade (The Vultures) (1961)
- Patlachya Poriche Lagin (Marriage of a Village Mayor's Daughter) (1965)
- Shantata! Court Chalu Aahe (Hindi: Khamosh! Adalat Jari Hai) (Silence! The Court is in Session) (1967)
- Ajgar Ani Gandharwa (A Boa Constrictor and "Gandharwa")
- Sakharam Binder (Sakharam, the Book-Binder) (1972)
- Kamala ("Kamala") (1981)
- Madi [in Hindi]
- Kanyadan (Giving Away of a Daughter in Marriage) (1983)
- Anji
- Dambadwicha Mukabala (Encounter in Umbugland)
- Ashi Pakhare Yeti (Hindi: Panchi Aise Aate Hain) (Thus Arrive the Birds)
- Kutte
- Safar/Cyclewallah (The Cyclist) (1991)
- The Masseur (2001)
- Pahije Jatiche (It Has to Be in One's Blood)
- Jat Hi Poochho Sadhu Ki (Ask a Fakir's Lineage)
- Majhi Bahin (My Sister)
- Jhala Ananta Hanumanta ("Infinite" Turned "Hanumanta")
- Footpayricha Samrat (Sidewalk Emperor)
- Mitrachi Goshta (A Friend's Story) (2001)
- Anand Owari [A play based on a novel by D. B. Mokashi]
- Bhau MurarRao
- Bhalyakaka
- Mee Jinkalo Mee Haralo (I won, I Lost)
- His Fifth Woman [in English] (2004)
- Bebi
- Mita ki kahani "(Mita's Story)
- Papa kho gaye

=== Musicals ===
- Ghashiram Kotwal (Ghashiram, the Constable) (1972)

=== Translations ===
- Mohan Rakesh's Adhe Adhure (originally in Hindi)
- Girish Karnad's Tughlaq (originally in Kannada) Popular Prakashan Pvt. Ltd. ISBN 81-7185-370-6.
- Tennessee Williams' A Streetcar Named Desire (originally in English)

==== Tendulkar's works available in English ====
- Silence! The Court Is in Session (Three Crowns). Priya Adarkar (Translator), Oxford University Press, 1979. ISBN 0-19-560313-3.
- Ghashiram Kotwal, Sangam Books, 1984 ISBN 81-7046-210-X.
- The Churning, Seagull Books, India, 1985 ISBN 0-85647-120-8.
- The Threshold: (Umbartha – Screenplay), Shampa Banerjee (Translator), Sangam Books Ltd.,1985 ISBN 0-86132-096-4.
- Five Plays (Various Translators), Bombay, Oxford University Press, 1992 ISBN 0-19-563736-4.
- The Last Days of Sardar Patel and The Mime Players: Two Screen Plays New Delhi, Permanent Black, 2001 ISBN 81-7824-018-1.
- Modern Indian Drama: An Anthology Sahitya Akademi, India, 2001 ISBN 81-260-0924-1.
- Mitrachi Goshta: A Friend's Story: A Play in Three Acts Gowri Ramnarayan (Translator). New Delhi, Oxford University Press, 2001 ISBN 0-19-565317-3.
- Kanyadan, Oxford University Press, India, New Ed edition, 2002 ISBN 0-19-566380-2.
- Collected Plays in Translation New Delhi, 2003, Oxford University Press. ISBN 0-19-566209-1.
- The Cyclist and His Fifth Woman: Two Plays by Vijay Tendulkar Balwant Bhaneja (Translator), 2006 Oxford India Paperbacks ISBN 0-19-567640-8.
- Sakharam Binder: Translated by Kumud Mehta and Shanta Gokhale.

=== Filmography ===
==== Screenplays ====
- Shantata! Court Chalu Aahe (Silence! The Court Is in Session) (1972)
- Nishant (End of Night) (1975)
- Samna (Confrontation) (1975)
- Manthan (Churning) (1976)
- Sinhasan (Throne) (1979)
- Gehrayee (The Depth) (1980)
- Aakrosh (Cry of the Wounded) (1980)
- Akriet (Unimaginable) (1981)
- Umbartha (The Threshold) (1981)
- Ardh Satya (Half Truth) (1983)
- Kamala (Kamala) (1984)
- Sardar (1993)
- Yeh Hai Chakkad Bakkad Bumbe Bo (2003)
- Eashwar Mime Co. (The Mime Players) (2005)

==== Dialogues ====
- Arvind Desai Ki Ajeeb Dastaan (1978)
- 22 June 1897

== See also ==
- List of Indian writers
