= The Blueberry Hunt =

- Promotional poster
- Directed by: Anup Kurian
- Written by: Anup Kurian
- Produced by: Arun Kurian; Anup Kurian; Mathewkutty J Mattam
- Starring: Naseeruddin Shah; Vipin Sharma; PJ Unnikrishnan; Aahana Kumra; Vinay Forrt; Mohanlal
- Cinematography: Viswamangal Kitsu
- Edited by: Unni Vijayan; Mandar Khanvilkar
- Music by: Paresh Kamath; Naresh Kamath
- Release date: 8 April 2016 (India)
- Running time: 110 minutes
- Countries: India; Canada
- Languages: Hindi; English

The Blueberry Hunt is an Indian-Canadian thriller film directed by Anup Kurian and starring Naseeruddin Shah, Vipin Sharma, Aahana Kumra, PJ Unnikrishnan, Yadu Sankalia, Vinay Forrt, and Kartik Elangovan. The film had a nationwide theatrical release in India on 8 April 2016.

== Plot ==
The Blueberry Hunt unfolds on a lush green, but deserted estate bordering a forest at the high altitudes of Vagamon, Kerala. The film centers around a recluse locally known as "Colonel"—played by Naseeruddin Shah, who live with his large German Shepherd. The story focuses on the five days during which the Colonel's plantation of a high-potency variant of marijuana—Blueberry Skunk—gets ready for harvest.

== Cast ==
- Naseeruddin Shah as Colonel
- Vipin Sharma
- PJ Unnikrishnan
- Yadu Sankalia
- Vinay Forrt
- Kartik Elangovan
- Aahana Kumra
- PT Manoj
- Sridevi
- Kethonuo Mechulho
- Khriesatuonuo Mechulho
- Vingukhonuo Mechulho
- Mrs. Antony
- Tipu
- Lakshmi

== Production ==
- The film was shot on location in Vagamon, Kerala.
