= Pagla Ghoda =

1960 film by Badal Sircar

Pagla Ghoda is a drama film written by Badal Sircar in 1960.

== Plot ==
The play revolves around four men who have gathered at the funeral of an unknown young woman who has committed suicide out of love. The play focuses on man-woman relationships and emphasises women's subjugation in a patriarchal system. It deftly examines the relationships of men and women from four different socioeconomic groups. Sircar implies here, rather obliquely, that regardless of education and background, men are the same, that is, rough and indifferent in their handling of passion, love, and women.
