= Satyadev Dubey =

Indian actor, director and playwright (1936–2011)

- Dubey in 1974
- Born: 13 July 1936; Bilaspur, Central Provinces and Berar, British India (present-day Chhattisgarh, India)
- Died: 25 December 2011 (aged 75); Mumbai, Maharashtra, India
- Other name: Pt. Satyadev Dubey
- Occupations: Actor; Theatre director; Playwright; Screenwriter; Film director
- Awards: Sangeet Natak Akademi Award (1971); National Film Award for Best Screenplay: Bhumika (1978)

Satyadev Dubey (13 July 1936 – 25 December 2011) was an Indian theatre director, actor, playwright, screenwriter & film director. He was awarded the Sangeet Natak Akademi Award in 1971.

He won the 1978 National Film Award for Best Screenplay for Shyam Benegal's Bhumika and 1980 Filmfare Best Dialogue Award for Junoon. In 2011, he was honoured with the Padma Bhushan by the Government of India.

== Biography ==
Satyadev Dubey was born in Bilaspur now in Chhattisgarh in 1936. He moved to Mumbai with the aim of becoming a cricketer, but ended up joining the Theatre Unit, a theatre group run by Ebrahim Alkazi, which also ran a school for many budding artists. Later when Alkazi left for Delhi to head the National School of Drama, Dubey took over Theatre Unit, and went on to produce many important plays in the Indian theatre.

He produced Girish Karnad's first play Yayati, and also his noted play Hayavadana, Badal Sarkar's Ewam Indrajit and Pagla Ghoda, Chandrashekhara Kambara's Aur Tota Bola (Jokumaraswamy in original Kannada), Mohan Rakesh's Aadhe Adhure, Vijay Tendulkar's Khamosh! Adalat Jaari Hai, and A Raincoat For All Occasions and Jean Anouilh's Antigone in 2007.

He is credited with the discovery of Dharmavir Bharati's Andha Yug, a play that was written for radio; Dubey saw its potential, sent it across to Ebrahim Alkazi at National School of Drama. When staged in 1962, Andha Yug brought in a new paradigm in Indian theatre of the times.

He made two short films Aparichay ke Vindhachal (1965) and Tongue In Cheek (1968), and directed a Marathi feature film, Shantata! Court Chalu Aahe (1971), based on Vijay Tendulkar's play, which in turn is based on Friedrich Dürrenmatt's story "Die Panne". Dubey had a five decade long and prolific career as theatre actor, director and playwright.

== Filmography ==
=== Writer ===
- Shantata! Court Chalu Aahe (1971, director)
- Ankur (1974, dialogue, screenplay)
- Manzilein Aur Bhi Hain (1974, dialogue)
- Nishant (1975, dialogue)
- Bhumika (1977, dialogue, screenplay)
- Junoon (1978, dialogue)
- Kalyug (1980, dialogue)
- Aakrosh (1980, dialogue)
- Vijeta (1982, dialogue, screenplay)
- Mandi (1983, screenplay)

=== Actor ===
- Deewaar (1975) - Actor (uncredited)
- Nishant (1975) - Priest (Pujari)
- Kondura (1978) - Ramanayye Master
- Anugraham (1978)
- Godam (1983) - Dharma
- Bharat Ek Khoj (1988, TV Series) - Chanakya
- Pita (1991)
- Maya (1993)
- Papa Kehte Hai (1996)
- Aahat Season 1 (1995–2001) (TvSeries)
- Hanan (2004) - Mahapoojary
- Ata Pata Lapatta (2012) - Pagla Baba (final film role)
