= Nishant (film) =

- DVD cover
- Directed by: Shyam Benegal
- Written by: Vijay Tendulkar; Satyadev Dubey (dialogues)
- Produced by: Mohan J. Bijlani; Freni Variava
- Starring: Girish Karnad; Shabana Azmi; Anant Nag; Amrish Puri; Smita Patil; Naseeruddin Shah
- Cinematography: Govind Nihalani
- Edited by: Bhanudas Divakar
- Music by: Vanraj Bhatia
- Release date: 5 September 1975 (India)
- Running time: 143 min
- Country: India
- Language: Hindi

Nishant (Hindi pronunciation: [nɪʃä̃ːnt]; transl. Night's end) is a 1975 Hindi drama film directed by Shyam Benegal, based on an original screenplay by noted playwright Vijay Tendulkar, with dialogues by Satyadev Dubey.

The film features an ensemble of parallel cinema actors including Girish Karnad, Amrish Puri, Shabana Azmi, Mohan Agashe, Anant Nag and Sadhu Meher with Smita Patil and Naseeruddin Shah. The film focuses on the power of the rural elite and the sexual exploitation of women, during feudal times in Telangana (Hyderabad State in the 1940s and 1950s).

The film won the 1977 National Film Award for Best Feature Film in Hindi. It was selected to compete for the Palme d'Or at the 1976 Cannes Film Festival. It was invited to the London Film Festival of 1976, Melbourne International Film Festival of 1977, and the Chicago International Film Festival of 1977, where it was awarded the Golden Plaque.

== Plot ==
The film is set in pre-independence feudal India in 1945. Vishwam is the youngest brother of the powerful and influential village jagirdar (feudal lord). The jagirdar will not hesitate to do anything for the welfare and protection of his family, which also includes bending the law to his own advantage. The shy and quiet Vishwam is married to Rukmani, while his brothers Anjaiya and Prasad make it a practice to demand the services of any village woman they fancy.

The village gets a new schoolmaster, who arrives in the village with a wife, Sushila, and a son. When Vishwam sees Sushila for the first time, he is unable to take his eyes off her and is unable to get her out of his mind. Sushila does not reciprocate his feelings. One night, while the schoolmaster is enjoying a quiet dinner with his family, someone knocks on the door. When Shushila goes to answer the door, Anjaiya and Prasad take her away forcibly. Several people are present, but no one dares to raise a hand or voice to stop this abduction.

At the jagirdar's house, Sushila is raped regularly and repeatedly at the will of the jagirdar and his brothers. The distraught schoolteacher, who is denied justice by everyone from the local police officer to the district collector, is helped by the old pujari of the village temple. They succeed in mobilising the villagers who slaughter their oppressors. In the end, the frenzied villagers also kill the innocent Rukmani, as well as Sushil, whom her husband was trying to rescue.

== Cast ==
- Girish Karnad as School master
- Shabana Azmi as Sushila, School master's wife
- Amrish Puri as Anna, the Jagirdar
- Anant Nag as Anjaiya, younger brother of Jagirdar
- Mohan Agashe as Prasad, younger brother of Jagirdar
- Naseeruddin Shah as Vishwam, youngest brother of Jagirdar
- Smita Patil as Rukmini, Vishwam's wife
- Satyadev Dubey as Village Priest (Pujari)
- Kulbhushan Kharbanda as Police Patel
- Sadhu Meher - Special appearance, who is accused of stealing temple jewellery
- Savita Bajaj as Jagirdar's household servant Pochamma
- Master Altaf as Sushila and School master's son

== Production ==
Smita Patil and Naseeruddin Shah made their debut with this film.

The film was shot in Pochampalli village in Telangana, known as 'weavers' village' and popular for its hand-woven sarees. It is also known as the Silk City of Bharat because of the high-quality silk sarees that are woven here.

== Soundtrack ==
The movie has only one song at the end "Piya Baj Pyala" sung by Preeti Sagar with music composed by Vanraj Bhatia.

== Reception ==
K.M. Amladi of India Today wrote, "It is however disappointing that Benegal's approach to the exploitation of the villagers is not subtle at all. The glaring facts which are exposed merely succeed in detracting from the credibility of the story. Benegal has, no doubt, used actual locations for his film and brought a measure of realism in the portrayal of the characters, but there seems to be an invisible gap between what he wants to depict and what the viewers want to comprehend or get involved in."

In a retrospective review, Ziya Us Salam of The Hindu wrote, "Miles removed from the work of everyday filmmakers, for many of whom cinema is nothing more than a hero waiting in eager anticipation of the heroine and post-dinner desserts, Benegal's "Nishant" (Night's End) is a dawn that did not come an hour too soon. The National Award for the best film, the nomination for the Oscars were just rewards for a film that lived up to its name."

== Accolades ==
Year	Nominee / work	Award	Result
1975	Freni M. Variava, Mohan J. Bijlani	National Film Award for Best Feature Film in Hindi	Won
1976	Freni M. Variava, Mohan J. Bijlani	Bengal Film Journalists' Association – Best Indian Films Award	Won
1976	Shyam Benegal	Best Director (Hindi section) - Bengal Film Journalists' Association Awards	Won
1976	Vijay Tendulkar	Best Screenplay (Hindi section) - Bengal Film Journalists' Association Awards	Won
1976	Shyam Benegal	Palme d'Or	Nominated
