= Naseeruddin Shah =

Indian actor (born 1950)

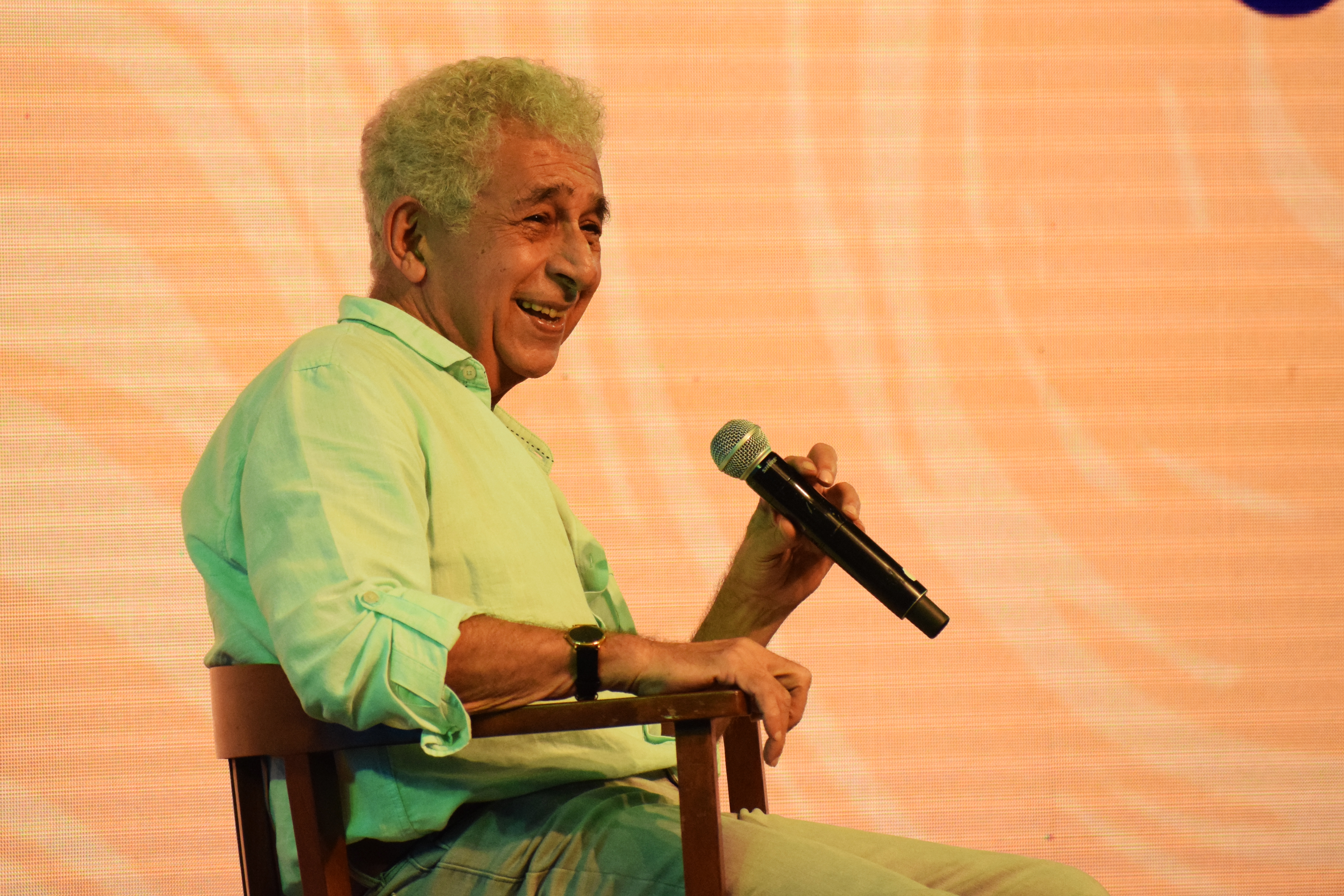
- Shah at IFP in 2019
- Pronunciation: [nəsiːɾʊd̪ːiːn ʃɑːɦ]
- Born: 20 July 1950 (age 76); Barabanki, Uttar Pradesh, India
- Education: Film and Television Institute; National School of Drama; Aligarh Muslim University
- Occupations: Actor; director
- Years active: 1972–present
- Works: Full list
- Spouse(s): Manara Sikri (deceased) Ratna Pathak Shah (m. 1982)
- Children: 3, inc. Imaad and Vivaan
- Relatives: Shah family
- Honours: Padma Bhushan; Padma Shri

Naseeruddin Shah (Note: Hindustani pronunciation: [nəsiːɾʊd̪ːiːn ʃɑːɦ].) (Hindustani pronunciation: [nəsiːɾʊd̪ːiːn ʃɑːɦ]; born 20 July 1950) is an Indian actor who works primarily in Hindi films. One of the most prolific actors of Indian cinema, especially in the parallel cinema movement, he has also starred in various international productions. He is the recipient of several accolades, including three National Film Awards, three Filmfare Awards and the Volpi Cup for Best Actor at the Venice Film Festival. The Government of India honoured him with the Padma Shri in 1987 and the Padma Bhushan in 2003 for his contributions to Indian cinema.

In 1982, he married his second wife, actress Ratna Pathak, daughter of actress Dina Pathak, with whom he has two sons. His sister-in-law is actress Supriya Pathak, who is married to actor Pankaj Kapur.

== Early life and education ==
Naseeruddin Shah was born on 20 July 1950 in Barabanki town, Uttar Pradesh, into a Nawab family. His great-great-grandfather was the Afghan warlord Jan-Fishan Khan, who would go on to become the Nawab of Sardhana. His relatives include author-diplomat Ikbal Ali Shah, poet Amina Shah, Omar Ali-Shah and Idries Shah, the latter of whom both Sufi writers. His relatives from Pakistan include actor-director Syed Kamal, Shah Mahboob Alam, former joint director and head of Pakistan's Intelligence Bureau in Sindh and Balochistan, and cricketer Owais Shah.

Shah attended St. Anselm's Ajmer school and St Joseph's College, Nainital. He graduated in arts from Aligarh Muslim University in 1971 and attended National School of Drama in Delhi.

His elder brother, Lt. General Zameerud-din Shah (Retd.) PVSM, SM, VSM, had a distinguished career in the military, having served as Deputy Chief of the Army Staff of the Indian Army, and later was appointed a member of the Armed Forces Tribunal and also Vice-Chancellor of Aligarh Muslim University.

== Career ==
=== Parallel and mainstream cinema ===
Shah started his film career in the mid-1970s in parallel cinema and has acted in films such as Nishant, Aakrosh, Sparsh, Mirch Masala, Albert Pinto Ko Gussa Kyon Ata Hai, Trikal, Bhavni Bhavai, Junoon, Mandi, Mohan Joshi Hazir Ho!, Ardh Satya and Katha.

Shah became active in mainstream Bollywood cinema with the 1980 film Hum Paanch. In 1982, he acted in the film Dil Aakhir Dil Hai directed by Ismail Shroff, opposite Rakhee. One of his most important films, Masoom, was released in 1983 and was shot at St Joseph's College, Nainital. That same year, he appeared in the cult comedy film Jaane Bhi Do Yaaron. His next major success in mainstream films was the 1986 multi-star film Karma where he acted alongside veteran Dilip Kumar. Starring roles for films such as Ijaazat (1987), Jalwa (1988) and Hero Hiralal (1989) followed. In 1988, he played opposite his wife Ratna Pathak as Inspector Ghote, the fictional detective of H. R. F. Keating's novels in the Merchant Ivory English language film The Perfect Murder. He acted with Aditya Pancholi in films like Maalamaal (1988) and Game (1993).

He has acted in several multi-starrer films as well, such as Ghulami (1985), Tridev (1989) and Vishwatma (1992). In 1994, he acted as the villain in Mohra, his 100th film as an actor. He forayed into Malayalam cinema the same year, through T. V. Chandran's drama Ponthan Mada. The film portrayed the irrational bonding of a feudal serf (played by Mammootty) and a colonial landlord (played by Shah). He strongly believed that the distinction between art and commercial films had largely reduced, especially with the directors of the former also making commercial films. In 2000, Shah played Mahatma Gandhi in Kamal Haasan's Hey Ram which focused on the assassination of Gandhi from the assailant's point of view.

Shah played Mohit, the drunken coach to a deaf and mute boy in Iqbal. Shah was noted for his roles in the 1999 Aamir Khan-starrer Sarfarosh, where he played Gulfam Hassan – a ghazal singer-cum-terrorist mastermind— and in Neeraj Pandey's A Wednesday (2008).

Shah has also starred in international projects, such as Monsoon Wedding in 2001 and a Hollywood adaptation of The League of Extraordinary Gentlemen in 2003 (co-starring Sean Connery), where he played Captain Nemo. His portrayal of Nemo was very close to the design of the graphic novel, although his Nemo was far less manic. He worked in Vishal Bhardwaj's Indian adaptation of Shakespeare's Macbeth, titled Maqbool, in 2003, and Rajiv Rai's Asambhav opposite Arjun Rampal and Priyanka Chopra in 2004. He then went on to work in The Great New Wonderful (2005). Shah played a pivotal role in Today's Special, Aasif Mandvi's 2009 independent comedy film. In 2011, Shah was seen in The Dirty Picture. He acted in Anup Kurian's The Blueberry Hunt, playing a recluse growing marijuana in his forest retreat, and in Waiting, starring opposite Kalki Koechlin, both of which were released in 2016.

Shah made his Pakistani film debut in Khuda Ke Liye by Shoaib Mansoor, where he played a short cameo. His second Pakistani film Zinda Bhaag was selected as the country's official entry to the 86th Academy Awards for the Best Foreign Language Film award.

In June 2026, Shah played the lead character of a 95-year-old man, Ishar "Keenu" Singh Grewal, in Imtiyaz Ali's directed movie Main Vaapas Aaunga.

=== As a director ===
Shah has performed with his theatre troupe at places such as New Delhi, Mumbai, Bangalore and Lahore. He has directed plays written by Lavender Kumar, Ismat Chughtai and Saadat Hasan Manto.

His directorial debut in movies, Yun Hota To Kya Hota, was released in 2006. It stars several established actors such as Konkona Sen Sharma, Paresh Rawal, Irrfan Khan, then-newcomer Ayesha Takia, his son Imaad Shah and his old friend Ravi Baswani.

=== Theatre and television ===
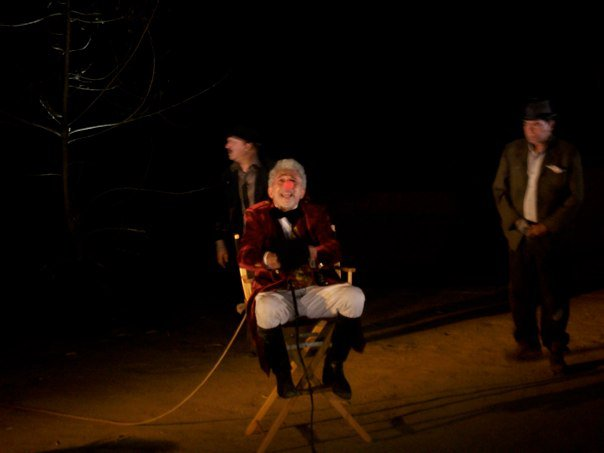
Naseeruddin Shah playing Pozzo in Motley's production of Waiting for Godot at The Doon School, 2009.

In 1977, Shah, Tom Alter and Benjamin Gilani formed a theatre group called Motley Productions. Their first play was Samuel Beckett's Waiting for Godot, which was staged at the Prithvi Theatre on 29 July 1979.

In 1988, he acted in the eponymous television series based on the life and times of Mirza Ghalib, directed by Gulzar and telecast on DD National.

In 1989, he acted as the Maratha King Shivaji in another eponymous television series Bharat Ek Khoj based on Jawaharlal Nehru's book The Discovery of India.

In the mid-1990s, Shah also hosted some episodes of science magazine programme Turning Point.

In 1999, he acted as a special agent in the TV series Tarkash on Zee TV. He played a retired agent haunted by nightmares who is re-inducted as he apparently knows something about a dreaded terrorist somehow connected with his past. He was the first of several celebrity actors, who played narrator in the popular audiobook series for kids Karadi Tales. He along with wife Ratna was the narrator in the film Paheli — the Indian entry to the 2006 Academy Awards.

In 2017, Shah returned to film, starring in the Shakespearean adaptation The Hungry, screened under special presentations at the Toronto International Film Festival 2017. He also acted as lead in The Coffin Maker directed by Veena Bakshi, which however never got released in public but only remained for private viewership.

In August 2026, he played lead in a Punjabi drama film Rehmat, directed by Gurvinder Singh based on short stories, which made it to the 79th Locarno Film Festival in the Main Competition.

== Personal life ==
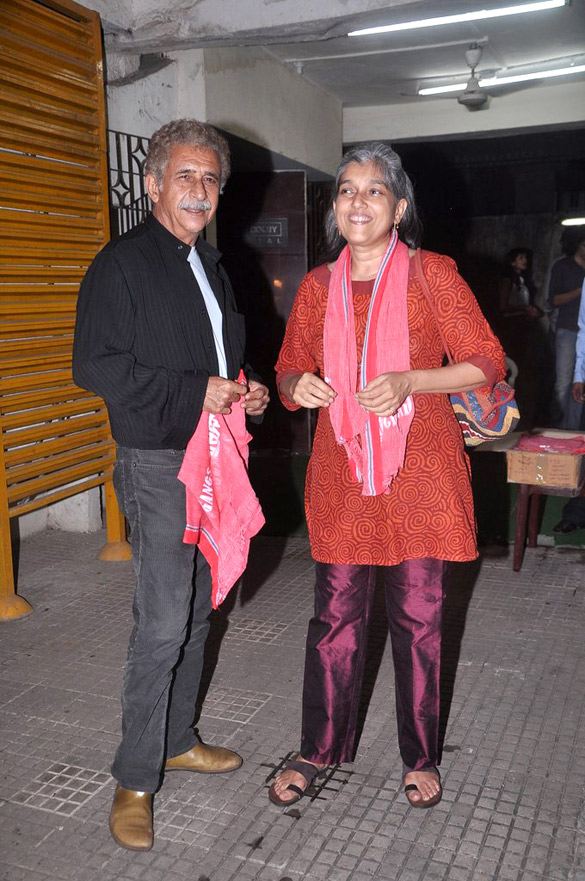
Shah with wife Ratna Pathak at Gangs of Wasseypur screening in 2012

Shah was married to Manara Sikri and had a daughter, Heeba Shah, with her. In the 1970s, Shah met and fell in love with Ratna Pathak, the daughter of Dina Pathak, a well-respected character actress. During the 70s and 80s they co-starred in several films, including Mirch Masala and The Perfect Murder. They were in a live-in relationship for many years, while Shah put together the mehr required to divorce Manara. Shah and Pathak were finally married in 1982. By his second marriage, Shah has two sons, Imaad and Vivaan, both of whom are actors. The couple lives in Mumbai with Heeba, Imaad and Vivaan. Shah identifies himself to be a non-practising Muslim.

== Awards and nominations ==
=== Civilian awards ===
- 1987 – Padma Shri – India's fourth highest civilian award
- 2003 – Padma Bhushan – India's third highest civilian award

=== Film awards ===
| Year | Category | Nominated work | Result |
National Film Awards
| 1979 | Best Actor | Sparsh | Won |
| 1984 | Best Actor | Paar | Won |
| 2006 | Best Supporting Actor | Iqbal | Won |
| | Filmfare Awards | | |
| 1980 | Best Supporting Actor | Junoon | Nominated |
| 1981 | Best Actor | Aakrosh | Won |
| 1982 | Best Actor | Chakra | Won |
| 1983 | Best Actor | Bazaar | Nominated |
| 1984 | Best Actor | Masoom | Won |
| 1984 | Best Supporting Actor | Katha | Nominated |
| 1984 | Best Supporting Actor | Mandi | Nominated |
| 1985 | Best Actor | Sparsh | Nominated |
| 1994 | Best Supporting Actor | Sir | Nominated |
| 1995 | Best Performance in a Negative Role | Mohra | Nominated |
| 1996 | Best Supporting Actor | Naajayaz | Nominated |
| 1997 | Best Performance in a Negative Role | Chaahat | Nominated |
| 1999 | Best Supporting Actor | China Gate | Nominated |
| 2000 | Best Performance in a Negative Role | Sarfarosh | Nominated |
| 2006 | Best Supporting Actor | Iqbal | Nominated |
| 2007 | Best Performance in a Negative Role | Krrish | Nominated |
| 2008 | Best Actor | A Wednesday! | Nominated |
| 2012 | Best Supporting Actor | The Dirty Picture | Nominated |
Filmfare OTT Awards
| 2021 | Best Supporting Actor in a Drama Series | Bandish Bandits | Nominated |
| 2021 | Best Actor in a Web Original Film | Mee Raqsam | Nominated |
IIFA Awards
| 2000 | Best Performance in a Negative Role | Sarfarosh | Won |
| 2006 | Best Supporting Actor | Iqbal | Nominated |
| 2008 | Best Performance in a Negative Role | Mithya | Nominated |
| 2009 | Best Actor | A Wednesday! | Nominated |
| 2011 | Best Performance in a Negative Role | Allah Ke Banday | Nominated |
| 2012 | Best Performance in a Negative Role | The Dirty Picture | Nominated |
| 2012 | Best Supporting Actor | The Dirty Picture | Nominated |
| 2015 | Best Supporting Actor | Finding Fanny | Nominated |
Bengal Film Journalists' Association Awards
| 1986 | Best Actor (Hindi) | Paar | Won |
| 2006 | Best Supporting Actor (Hindi) | Iqbal | Won |
Venice Film Festival
| 1984 | Volpi Cup for Best Actor | Paar | Won |

=== Other awards ===
- 2000: Won: Sangeet Natak Akademi Award

== Autobiography ==
In an interview with HT Brunch, Shah speaks about having thought about an autobiography for almost 10 years. He penned down his thoughts occasionally during this period until he finally came up with 100-odd pages. He then presented the unfinished version to his friend, historian Ramchandra Guha, who encouraged Shah to complete it and send it to a publication house. Shah's memoir is titled And Then One Day, and was published by Hamish Hamilton.

== Bibliography ==
- Shah, Naseeruddin (2014). And then one day: A Memoir. Hamish Hamilton.
