= Gauhar Raza =

Indian scientist and Urdu poet (born 1956)

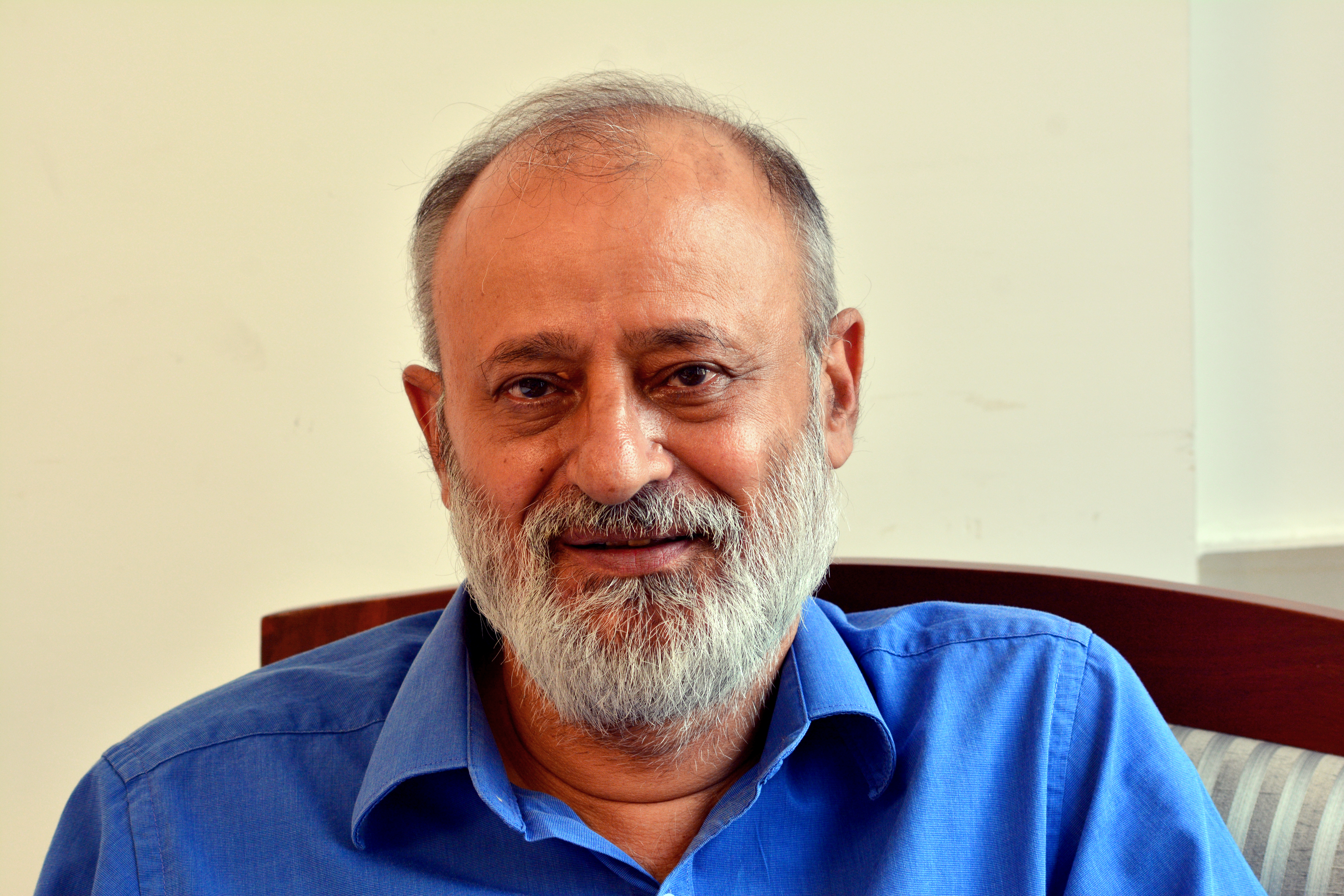
- Born: 17 August 1956 (age 70); Aligarh, Uttar Pradesh
- Occupations: poet, activist, scientist, documentary filmmaker
- Spouse: Shabnam Hashmi

Gauhar Raza (born 17 August 1956) is an Indian engineer, science communicator, Urdu poet, social activist and documentary filmmaker. He is known for his films like Jung-e-Azadi, on India's First War of Independence, and Inqilab (2008) on Bhagat Singh. He was also the honorary director of Jahangirabad Media Institute.

== Early life and education ==
He was born in Allahabad (now Prayagraj), Uttar Pradesh, India on 17 August 1956. His family moved to Aligarh in 1958. His father Wizarat Husain (1919–2007) was a freedom fighter, communist party member and renowned educationist and science teacher at Aligarh Muslim University, Aligarh. His mother, a social worker, was also intensely involved in freedom struggle and had worked with Indira Gandhi in Allahabad.

He completed a BSc in engineering at Aligarh Muslim University (AMU) in 1977 and an MTech in Power Apparatus and Systems at the Indian Institute of Technology, Delhi in 1979. He was a member of the Students' Federation of India (SFI) when he studied at AMU. During the Emergency, he was the SFI Secretary of Western Uttar Pradesh.

== Career ==
In 1979 he joined Eicher Goodearth Ltd., a multinational company, as an electrical engineer and worked there for 3 years. He solved some major design problems that the company was facing and within a short time he rose to Executive-Engineer level. In 1982 he joined the National Institute of Science, Technology and Development Studies as a scientist and he continues to work there.

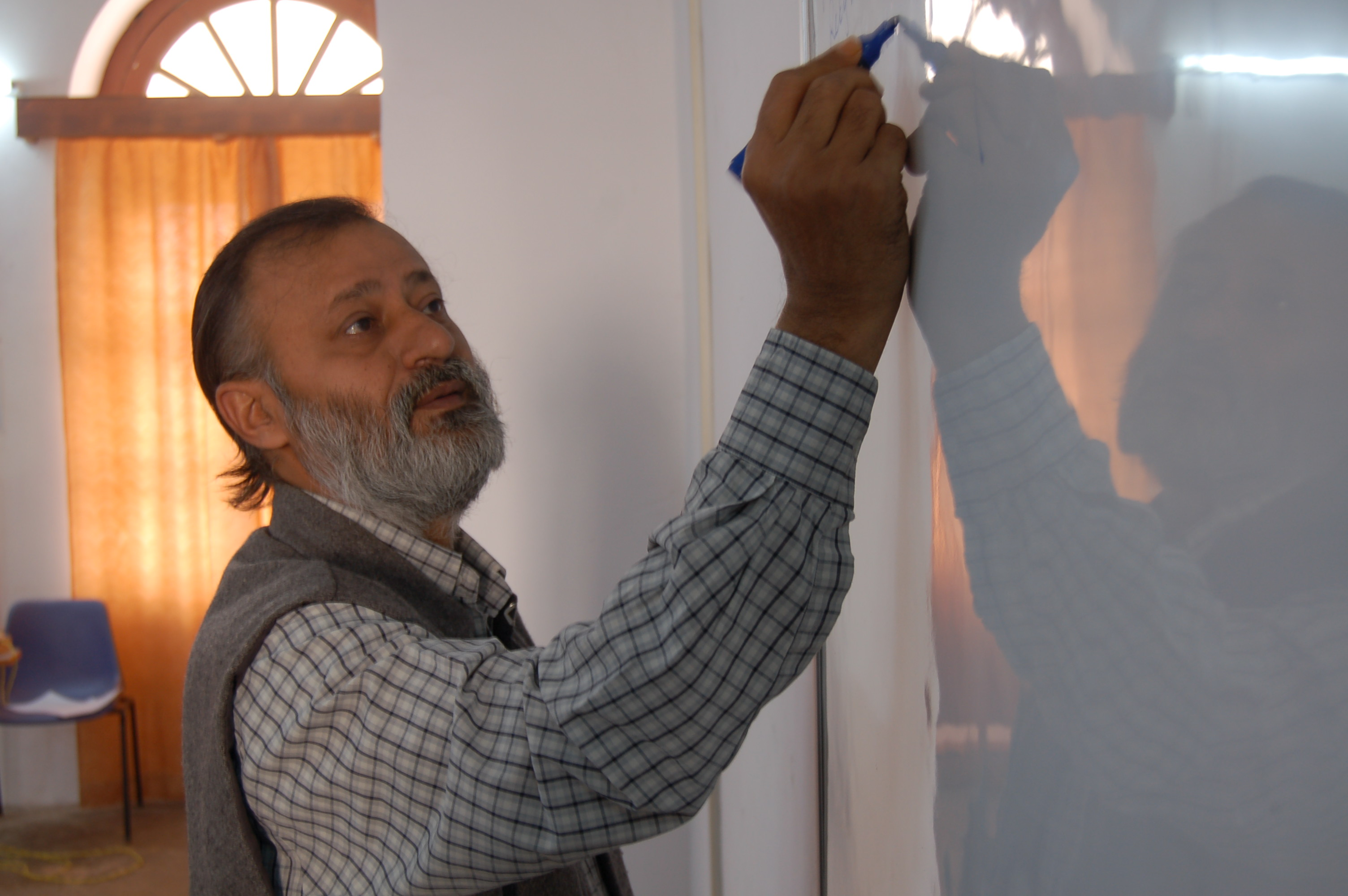

=== Poetry ===
Gauhar Raza's poetry collection Jazbon Ki Lau Tez Karon has been noted for its frankness of tone and social concerns. In his most famous poem, "Main Chahta hoon" ("I like to"), he express his helplessness to write a romantic poem in days of darkness. He also wrote lyrics for a Hindi film, Say Salaam India, released in 2007.

== Personal life ==
He is married to the activist Shabnam Hashmi, sister of the murdered theatre activist Safdar Hashmi. The couple have a son, Sahir Raza, and a daughter, Seher. He identifies as an atheist.

== Works ==
- Plague, Media and People, NITADS, 1996 (co-writers: Bharvi Dutt and Surjit Singh)
- Confluence of Science and Peoples' Knowledge at the Sangam, NISTADS, 1996 (co-writers: Surjit Singh, Bharvi Dutt and Jagdish Chander)
- A Delicate Space Ship, Youth for Disarmament, Delhi, 1998
- Jazbon Ki Lau Tez Karo, Raj Kamal, Delhi, 1999
- Walk the Sky, A play on violence against women, V-Day, Delhi, 2001
- Science Crafts and Knowledge: Understanding of Science Among Artisans in India and South Africa: a Cross-cultural Endeavour, Protea Book House, Pretoria, 2002 edited along with Hester du Plessis
- HIV/AIDS Public Understanding and Attitude, NYKS, 2007 (co-writers: Surjit Singh and Chader Shekhar Pran)

== Awards ==
- Best subject expert for educational film in 1999 by the University Grants Commission.
- Creative Literature Award, Hindi Academy, 2001, for his collection of poems Jazbon Ki Lau Tez Karo
- For contribution to science writings and propagation of science, Urdu Academy, Delhi, 2002

== See also ==
- Faiz Ahmad Faiz
- Civil society
- Social Activist
- Scientist
- Shabnam Hashmi
