= Sudhanva Deshpande =

Indian theatre actor and editor (b. 1967)

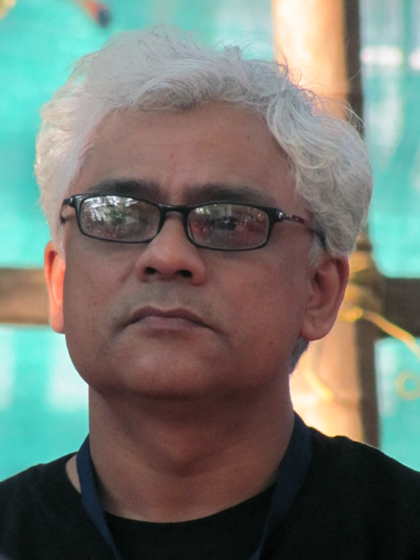
- Deshpande in 2010

Permanent Invitee to Central Committee, Communist Party of India (Marxist)
- Incumbent
- Assumed office 6 April 2025

Personal details
- Born: 26 December 1967 (age 58)
- Party: Communist Party of India (Marxist)
- Relations: Deshpande–Subhash–Kulkarni family
- Parent(s): G. P. Deshpande, Kalindi Deshpande
- Occupation: Actor, Editor, Politician

Sudhanva Deshpande (born 26 December 1967) is an Indian theatre actor, director, and editor associated with the radical street theatre group Jana Natya Manch (Janam). He is the managing editor of the publishing house LeftWord Books and has authored a book on the life and death of theatre activist Safdar Hashmi. In 2025, he was appointed as a permanent invitee to the Central Committee of the Communist Party of India (Marxist).

== Early life and education ==
Deshpande was born on 26 December 1967. He attended Ramjas College in Delhi for his higher education. He grew up in the campus of Jawaharlal Nehru University campus in Delhi, where his father G. P. Deshpande was a China studies professor and playwright. In 1987, at the age of 19, he joined the theatre collective Jana Natya Manch.

== Career ==
=== Theatre ===
Deshpande’s involvement in street theatre was significantly shaped by his association with Safdar Hashmi. He was present during the 1989 attack on a Janam performance in Jhandapur, which resulted in Hashmi's death. Following Hashmi's death, Deshpande continued to work with the troupe as both an actor and a director.

His directorial work includes plays such as Yeh Dil Maange More and Gurgaon. He has also been involved in creating documentary films and has participated in international theatre festivals and workshops.

He is also a core team member of Strategic Management in the Art of Theatre (SMART), a theatre management training programme.

=== Publishing and writing ===
Deshpande serves as the managing editor of LeftWord Books, a publishing house based in New Delhi. He is also involved in the management of May Day Bookstore and Cafe in Delhi.

In 2020, he authored Halla Bol: The Death and Life of Safdar Hashmi, a book that provides a first-hand account of the events surrounding Hashmi's killing and explores the history of Janam and its impact on Indian street theatre.

In 2024, he made a documentary on Habib Tanvir titled Gaon Ke Naon Theatre, Mor Naon Habib (transl. My village is my theatre, my name is Habib).

=== Politics ===
In April 2025, he was appointed as a permanent invitee to the Central Committee of the CPI(M).

== Media dispute ==
In 2018, Deshpande was involved in a dispute with the news channel Times Now. He accused the channel and its then-anchor of disseminating misinformation by labeling him a "Maoist sympathizer" in connection to a video of a lecture he had given at IIT Bombay. Deshpande denied these allegations, stating that his lecture regarding the history of theatre had been taken out of context.

== Works ==
- Halla Bol: The Death and Life of Safdar Hashmi. LeftWord Books. 2020. ISBN 978-81-945025-0-0.
