= Deshbandhu (disambiguation) =

Deshbandhu means "friend of the nation" in Hindi and Bengali, and may refer to:

- Deshbandhu, popular name of Chittaranjan Das, lawyer noted for his role in the Indian independence movement
- Deshbandhu (newspaper), an Indian newspaper in Hindi
- Deshbandhu College, University of Delhi, named after Deshbandhu Gupta
- Deshbandhu College for Girls in Kolkata, named after Chittaranjan Das
- Deshbandhu Mahavidyalaya, college in Chittaranjan, Burdwan district, West Bengal, named after Chittaranjan Das

People

- Deshbandhu Gupta (1901–1951), Indian freedom fighter
- Desh Bandhu Gupta (1938–2017), Indian entrepreneur
- Desh Bandhu, common nickname for Adrian Cola Rienzi (b. Krishna Deonarine Tiwari), Indo-Trinidadian lawyer, politician and trade unionist

== Other ==
- Deshbandhu Group, Bangladeshi conglomerate
