= Janam =

Janam may refer to:

- Janam (1985 film), a 1985 Hindi film
- Janam (1993 film), a 1993 Indian Malayalam film
- Jana Natya Manch ("People's Theatre Front"; Janam for short), a New Delhi–based amateur theatre company
- Janam TV, an Indian television channel

== See also ==
- Janam Kundli, a 1995 Indian Bollywood film
- Janam Se Pehle, a 1994 Indian Bollywood film
- "Janam Janam" ("Life after Life"), a Hindi song from the soundtrack of the 2015 Indian film Dilwale
