= Sohail Hashmi =

Oral historian of Delhi

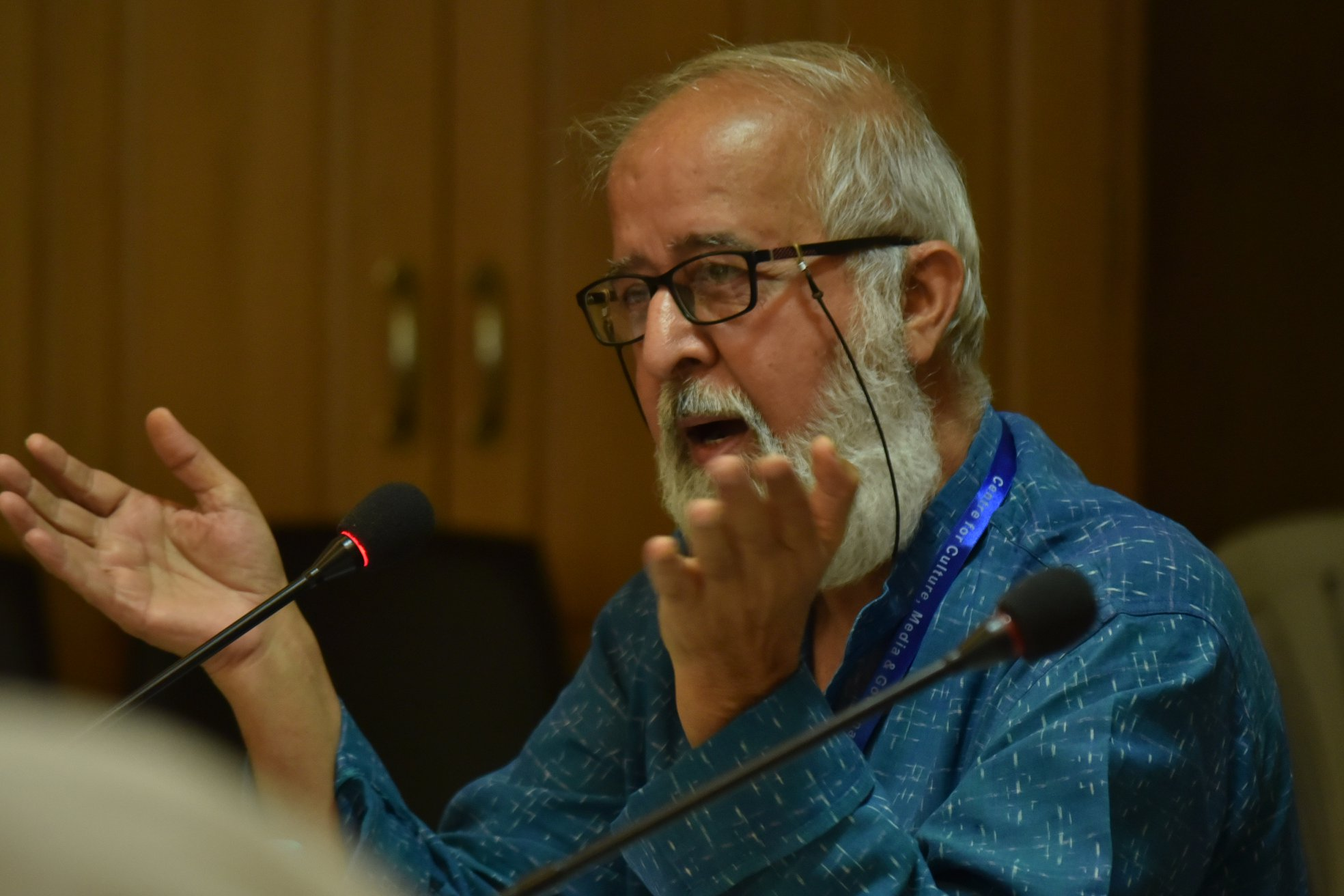
- Occupation: Oral historian of Delhi
- Known for: Delhi Heritage Walks
- Relatives: Shabnam Hashmi (sister); Safdar Hashmi (brother); Saba Azad (niece)

Sohail Hashmi is an oral historian of Delhi, social activist, film-maker and heritage conservationist.

== Career ==
Hashmi conducts immersive Delhi Heritage Walks which are aimed at introducing citizens, particularly children, to their city. He incorporates history of people, culture, food and architecture of Delhi in these walks. He won a Heritage Award from INTACH (Indian National Trust for Art and Cultural Heritage) Delhi Chapter in 2022 for his walks.

Hashmi is the author of a book Sanchi: Where Tigers Fly and Lions Have Horns. It is a part of the UNESCO World Heritage Sites of India Series.

Hashmi is a social activist with NGOs Act Now for Harmony and Democracy (ANHAD) and Safdar Hashmi Memorial Trust (SAHMAT).

Hashmi is a linguist and advocates maintaining the popularity of diversity of Indian languages.

Hashmi advocates preservation of heritage and history when development and revamping projects are undertaken.
