= Govind Purushottam Deshpande =

Indian playwright and academic (1938–2013)

- Born: 2 August 1938; Nashik, Maharashtra, India
- Died: 16 October 2013 (aged 75); Pune, Maharashtra, India
- Education: Maharaja Sayajirao University of Baroda; University of Pune; Jawaharlal Nehru University
- Occupations: Playwright; academic
- Spouse: Kalindi Deshpande
- Relatives: Deshpande–Subhash–Kulkarni family
- Writing career
- Pen name: GPD; GoPu
- Language: Marathi; English
- Notable works: Udhwasta Dharmashala (1973); Rastey (1996)
- Notable awards: Maharashtra State Award; Sangeet Natak Akademi Award (1996)
- Movement: Political theatre

Govind Purushottam Deshpande (2 August 1938 – 16 October 2013) popularly known as GPD or Gopu, was a Marathi playwright, literary critic, political commentator, and academic specialising in China studies, which he taught at the Centre for East Asian Studies, Jawaharlal Nehru University, in New Delhi, for thirty-five years, until 2004. As a playwright, he pioneered political plays and 'discussion plays' in Marathi theatre and went on to write seminal works such as Udhwasta Dharmashala (A Man in Dark Times, 1973), Andhar Yatra (A Passage to Darkness, 1987), Ek Vazoon Gela Ahe (Past One O'Clock, 1987), Satyashodhak (The Truth Seeker, 1994), and Raastey (1989), some of which were translated into Hindi and English, helping shape the modernist movement in Indian theatre in the 1970s. He was the author of Dialectics of Defeat: The Problems of Culture in Postcolonial India (2006), The World of Ideas in Modern Marathi: Phule, Vinoba, Savarkar (2009), and Talking the Political Culturally and Other Essays (2009).

He was a recipient of the Sangeet Natak Akademi Award (1996) for playwriting, the Kala Gaurava Puruskar (2005), and the Jeevan Gaurava Puraskar for Literature (2010). He wrote a column titled "Of Life, Letters and Politics" in Economic and Political Weekly for three decades. He was one of the founding members of the Institute of Chinese Studies in Delhi and also served as its director. Later, the institute, along with Deshpande's family, established the GP Deshpande Award in his memory.

== Biography ==
=== Early life and education ===
Born in Nashik, Deshpande grew up in Rahimatpur, where he did his schooling. He graduated from Maharaja Sayajirao University of Baroda in 1954 and subsequently obtained an M.A. in ancient Indian history from the University of Pune in 1960. He later studied Chinese in Hong Kong and received his PhD in Chinese studies from the Indian School of International Studies, Jawaharlal Nehru University (JNU) in New Delhi.

=== Career ===
==== Academic work ====
Deshpande later taught Chinese politics and international relations at the Centre for East Asian Studies at Jawaharlal Nehru University. He served as chairperson of the Centre for East Asian Studies and dean of the School of International Studies, and he supervised postgraduate and doctoral research for more than three decades, until his retirement in 2004. Besides ancient Indian history, he was also versed in Sanskrit texts and Bhakti poetry.

Deshpande edited the journal Economic and Political Weekly, wherein he wrote the column "Of Life, Letters and Politics", for three decades. He co-founded the Journal of Arts & Ideas with the art critic Geeta Kapur in Delhi in October 1982, and he regularly contributed editorial essays and criticism on theatre, politics, and culture. Twelve of his books have been acquired by the Library of Congress, including a few on Chinese foreign policy.

=== Theatre and literary work ===
In the early 1970s, Deshpande worked with Sai Paranjpye and Arun Joglekar in the theatre group Natyadwayi. He acted in Paranjpye's Hindi production Ek Tamasha Achchha Khasa, which was staged in Delhi inFebruary 1971 as the inaugural play at Shri Ram Centre. Deshpande was associated with the development of political theatre and 'discussion plays' in the Marathi language. After a few short stories, he wrote his first play, Udhwasta Dharmashala (A Man in Dark Times) in 1973. It examined the persecution of a left-wing professor by the university. Deshpande drew inspiration for the play from reports of the political persecution of suspected communists in the United States during the McCarthy era. It was first staged by Shreeram Lagoo at Chhabildas Hall, Mumbai, in October 1974. It was subsequently translated to Hindi by Vasant Dev. It was directed by Rajinder Nath in 1977, with Om Puri in the lead role. In November 1978, it became the inaugural play of Prithvi Theatre, Mumbai, staged by Naseeruddin Shah. Padatik produced it in 1982, directed by Shyamanand Jalan in Kolkata, where he and Chetna Jalan played the lead roles. Raastey (Roads), written in Marathi in 1989, is a discussion play centred around the ideological differences between three friends—a Marxist, a nationalist, and a religious-pragmatic. It reflected Despande's own inner conflict during a period marked by disintegration of the USSR, increasingly prominent capitalism in the US, as well as the rise of religious fundamentalism in India. It was directed by Satyadev Dubey for the National School of Drama Repertory Company in 1995, and later by Arvind Gaur in 2012.

Satyadev Dubey directed several of his plays, including Andhar Yatra (1987), Chanakya Vishnugupta (1989), and Raaste (2002). Satyashodhak (1992), based on the social reformer Jyotirao Phule and founder of Satyashodhak Samaj, was written for Jana Natya Manch, which first performed it in September 1992, directed by Sudhanva Deshpande. In 2012, the play was revived by Atul Pethe with actors largely from Pune Municipal Corporation's sanitation workers, and it employed the traditional jalsa form of folk theatre. Deshpande edited an anthology of Indian plays in translation, Modern Indian Drama, published by Sahitya Akademi in 2004. In all, besides his academic career, he wrote nine plays, which were "characterized by a political questioning, sparked off by tension between conflicting ideas and thought processes".

As a screenwriter, his credits include Drohkaal (1994) and Dev (2004), both directed by Govind Nihalani. He was part of the scriptwriting team for Shyam Benegal's historical television series Bharat Ek Khoj (1989). He also made a cameo appearance in the Marathi film Pune 52.

== Awards and recognition ==
Deshpande received the Maharashtra State Award for his collective work in 1977, the Sangeet Natak Akademi Award for playwrighting in 1996, the Kala Gaurava Puruskar in 2005, and the Jeevan Gaurava Puraskar for Literature in 2010. He twice received the Utkrishta Vangmaya Nismriti Puraskar prize from the Government of Maharashtra as well as the Jaywant Dalvi Smriti Puraskar award, in 1997.

== Personal life ==
Deshpande lived in Pune after his retirement from JNU in 2004. He suffered a brain haemorrhage in July 2013 and was hospitalised, after which he fell into a coma. He died at home on 16 October 2013, aged 74.

Deshpande was married to Kalindi Deshpande, a women's rights activist, who died in 2009. His daughter is an economist at the Delhi School of Economics, and his son, Sudhanva Deshpande, is a publisher with LeftWord Books and a theatre activist with Jana Natya Manch in Delhi. The Marathi actress Jyoti Subhash is his sister, and her daughter Amruta, also an actress, is his niece.

== Selected works ==
=== Books and essays ===
- China's Cultural Revolution: A View from India. Economic and Political Weekly, Bombay, 1971.
- United Front Against Imperialism: China's Foreign Policy in Africa. With H. K. Gupta. Somaiya Publications, Bombay, 1986.
- Nataki Nibandha (Marathi). 1995.
- Charchaka Nibandha (Marathi). 1999.
- Dialectics of Defeat: The Problems of Culture in Postcolonial India. Seagull Books, Kolkata, 2006. ISBN 9788170462798.
- The World of Ideas in Modern Marathi: Phule, Vinoba, Savarkar. Tulika Books, New Delhi, 2009. ISBN 9788189487607.
- Talking the Political Culturally and Other Essays. Thema Books, Kolkata, 2009. ISBN 9788186017685.
- The World of Ideas in Modern Marathi (Phule, Vinoba, Savarkar), Tulika Books, 2009. ISBN 9788189487607

=== Plays ===
- Udhwastha Dharmashala (1973) (A Man in Dark Times)
- Andhar Yatra (A Journey in Darkness)
- Satyashodhak (The Truth Seeker, 1994)
- Music System
- Raastey (Marathi, 1989).

==== Plays in translation ====
- A Man in Dark Times (English translation. of Udhwasta Dharmashala). Translated by Shanta Gokhale. Seagull Books, Kolkata, 1990. ISBN 9788170460367
- Past One O'Clock (English translation of Ek Vajun Gela Aahe). Translated by Arundhati Deosthale. Seagull Books, 1994
- Chanakya Vishnugupta. Translated into English by Maya Pandit. Seagull Books, Kolkata, 1996. ISBN 9788170461333
- Political Plays (A Man in Dark Times, Past One O'Clock, A Passage to Darkness). Edited by Shanta Gokhale. Seagull Books, Kolkata, 1998. ISBN 8170461324
- Raaste (Hindi translation of the Marathi play Raastey), translated by Jyoti Subhash. National School of Drama, New Delhi, 1999.
- Uddhwast Dharmashala Tatha Anya Natak (Hindi), Translated by Vasant Dev, Shankar Nene, and Vijay Bapat. Rajkamal Prakashan, 2005. ISBN 9360860263

=== Edited works ===
- Modern Indian Drama: An Anthology. Sahitya Akademi, New Delhi, 2000; 2004 edition, reprinted 2017. ISBN 9788126018758.
- 50 Years of India-China: Crossing a Bridge of Dreams. Co-edited with Alka Acharya. Tulika Books, New Delhi, 2001. ISBN 9788185229614.
- Selected Writings of Jotirao Phule. LeftWord Books, New Delhi, 2002; reprinted 2021. ISBN 9788187496885.
