= Prabhu Chawla =

Indian journalist

- Born: 2 October 1946 (age 78); Dera Ghazi Khan, Punjab, British India (Present-day Punjab, Pakistan)
- Occupation: Journalist
- Family: Keshav Chawla
- Awards: Padma Bhushan (2003)

Prabhu Chawla (born 2 October 1946) is an Indian journalist. He was born in Dera Ghazi Khan, Punjab, British India. He is alumni of Deshbandhu college University of Delhi. He started his career as an economics lecturer in Delhi University. He is the Editorial Director of The New Indian Express, a Chennai-based newspaper in India. Earlier he was the Editor-in-Chief of the same newspaper.

== Career ==
Prior to his assignment with The New Indian Express, he was the editor of Language publications in India Today news magazine. Before holding this post he worked as the Group editorial director of India Today Group till November 2010. Mr Chawla has the unique distinction of being the only journalist ever in India whose story had led to the fall of a Government in New Delhi. He scooped the controversial Jain Commission report on the assassination of Rajiv Gandhi. Its publication in the magazine led to the Congress withdrawing support to the United Front government, which led to the fall of the Inder Kumar Gujral led regime in 1997.

While at India Today, he hosted a popular talk show Seedhi Baat on Aaj Tak channel where he grilled prominent personalities. After leaving the group he was replaced by M. J. Akbar. He moved to IBN7 to host weekly talk show Teekhi Baat. He hosted Sachchi Baat on National Voice, Siddhi Gal on PTC News and is the editorial director of The New Indian Express Group. He also has his own YouTube channel.

After a hiatus of 10 years, he once again returned to host Seedhi Baat on Aaj Tak.

He also appeared as himself in the 2008 Hindi feature film Halla Bol.

== Awards ==
Prabhu Chawla was awarded the Padma Bhushan by the Indian government in 2003. A chronological list of various awards and recognition -

- 2016: Punjabi Icon Award
- 2016: Lifetime Achievement Award - 5th IMWA 2016 awards
- 2010: Global Punjabi Society Achievers Award
- 2009: Indian Television Academy Award for the Best News and Current Affairs Anchor for Seedhi Baat programme that featured people in the news from politics, culture to sports
- 2008: Indian Television Academy Award for the Best Talk Show Host
- 2008: Sansui Television Best TV Anchor Award
- 2005 : The Hero Honda-Indian Television Academy (ITA) Best Anchor award for `Seedhi Baat’ (telecast on Aajtak)
- 2003: Padma Bhushan by the President of India
- 2003: Telly Awards — TV NEWS ANCHOR OF THE YEAR
- 1998: TSR Kalapeetham Life Time Achievement Award
- 1989 : GK REDDY MEMORIAL AWARD for "in recognition of proficiency in writing about national and international events. An acknowledgement of the range and depth of political reporting in India Today.’’
- 1985-86: FEROZE GANDHI MEMORIAL AWARD for "meticulous reporting of national affairs and investigative stories".
- 1984: VEERESALINGAM INVESTIGATIVE JOURNALISM AWARD instituted by Dr Vasireddi Malathi Trust Hithakarini Samaj, Rajahmundry, Andhra Pradesh
