= Inqilab =

- Directed by: Gauhar Raza
- Written by: Gauhar Raza
- Produced by: Nehru Memorial Museum and Library, ANHAD
- Music by: Kaajal
- Release date: 2008
- Running time: 40 min
- Country: India
- Language: Hindi

Inqilab is a 2008 Indian documentary film directed by Gauhar Raza, about Indian freedom fighter, Bhagat Singh, co-produced by Nehru Memorial Museum and Library (NMML) and Act Now for Harmony and Democracy (ANHAD) in connection with the birth centenary of Bhagat Singh.

== Overview ==
The 40-minute documentary which contains archival footage and original visuals of locations, is a tribute to the memory and sacrifice of Bhagat Singh, one of the most venerated nationalist figures in contemporary India. The documentary traces the evolution of this revolutionary icon as a political thinker and a visionary in the context of the Indian freedom struggle. The film is an attempt to craft an intellectual biography of Bhagat Singh in an audio-visual format. The documentary is produced as a part of the year-long celebrations organised by the Nehru Memorial Museum and Library in connection with the 100th birth anniversary of Bhagat Singh

It begins by tracking the early influences, beginning with Bhagat Singh's family, locating him in the national and international political context and finally tracing the roots of his future ideological formations. Through diverse textual material available at various repositories, it weaves through the biographical turning points to construct Bhagat Singh's dream of an independent, egalitarian, socialist and multicultural India.

Parts of the documentary contain narration by Zohra Sehgal, Suchitra Gupta and Sarah Hashmi. Apart from this renowned social activists, intellectuals and historians, including Swami Agnivesh, Kuldip Nayar, Prof. Bipan Chandra, Prof. V.P. Dutt, Prof. K.N. Panikkar, Jagmohan Singh, Prof. Shantha Sinha, Prof. Chaman Lal, Prof. Urvashi Butalia, Dr S. Irfan Habib, Kamla Bhasin and Arpana Kaur, have also narrated parts of the script.

The documentary was shot in Lahore, Banga, Kolkata, Kanpur, Amritsar and Delhi.

At the end of the documentary Bhagat Singh's Punjabi-language track "Ghodi" was used as the background song. It was composed by students of DAV College, Lahore just after Bhagat Singh's execution and even now is part of folk tradition on both sides of the India-Pak border.
