= Halla Bol =

2008 Indian film by Rajkumar Santoshi

- Theatrical release poster
- Directed by: Rajkumar Santoshi
- Screenplay by: Rajkumar Santoshi
- Story by: Rajkumar Santoshi
- Produced by: Abdol Samee Siddiqui
- Starring: Ajay Devgn; Vidya Balan
- Cinematography: Natty Subramaniam
- Edited by: Steven H. Bernard
- Music by: Sukhwinder Singh
- Production companies: Pyramid Saimira; Sunrise Pictures Pvt. Ltd.
- Distributed by: Indian Films through Shree Ashtavinayak Cine Vision
- Release date: 11 January 2008
- Running time: 142 minutes
- Country: India
- Language: Hindi
- Budget: ₹ 270 million
- Box office: ₹ 193.9 million

Halla Bol (Raise Your Voice) is a 2008 Indian Hindi-language drama film written and directed by Rajkumar Santoshi. Halla Bol stars Ajay Devgn and Vidya Balan in pivotal roles and a number of celebrities from the Hindi and other film industries appear as themselves. Produced by Samee Siddiqui, the film's score and soundtrack were composed by Sukhwinder Singh, while Natty Subramaniam and Steven Bernard were the cinematographer and editor respectively. It was released on 11 January 2008. The film was remade with an adapted story in Bengali in 2010 named Pratidwandi.

The film touches upon the Jessica Lall murder case, Aamir Khan's involvement with the Narmada Bachao Andolan, the Right to Information Act, and public participation in fighting corruption. It also references the theatre group Jan Natya Manch, whose leader, theatre activist Safdar Hashmi, was killed by political rivals while performing a street play by the same name, Halla Bol!, in 1989.

== Plot ==
Ashfaque is a small-town boy aspiring to be a film star in the Hindi film industry. He joins a street theatre group run by a reformed dacoit Sidhu, who uses street theatre as a medium to bring about an awakening in the masses. Ashfaque struggles to give a creative vent to the actor in him in order to realise his dreams. Ashfaque's determined struggle pays off and he gets a break in films. He gets a new screen name – Sameer Khan. He moves up the success ladder in a very short time.

Soon, he becomes Sameer Khan the superstar. Amidst all the adulation and applause, he slowly loses his own identity. He forgets his real self and imbibes all characteristics of the various roles played by him on screen. Corruption overtakes his entire system, alienating him from all loved ones, including his wife Sneha.

== Cast ==
- Ajay Devgn as Ashfaaq Khan / Sameer
- Vidya Balan as Sneha Khan
- Pankaj Kapur as Sidhu
- Darshan Jariwala as Ganpatrao Gaekwad
- Sanjay Mishra as Sameer's manager
- Abhay Bhargava
- Anupam Shyam
- Aanjjan Srivastav as Amanullah Khan
- Sulbha Arya as Nazma Khan
- Iqbal Dosani as a Police Commissioner
- Rahul Kanawat as Ranveer
- Deepak Pandit as Police Inspector Rathod
- Arun Behll as a Reporter
- Sitaram Panchal
- Rushita Singh
- Mukesh Tiwari

=== Special appearances ===
- Prabhu Chawla as himself
- Lekh Tandon as himself
- Tusshar Kapoor as himself
- Sana Khan as herself
- Jackie Shroff as himself
- Ruby Bhatia as herself
- Sayali Bhagat in the song "Is Pal Ki Soch"
- Pahlaj Nihalani as himself
- Kareena Kapoor as herself
- Neeraj Vora as himself
- Amjad Sabri as himself at Dargah

Special appearances at the award ceremony (in order of appearance):

- Javed Jaffrey
- Rishi Kapoor
- Vijay Raaz
- Randhir Kapoor
- Vinod Khanna
- Kabir Bedi
- Mammootty
- Mohanlal
- Ritesh Deshmukh
- Abhishek Bachchan
- Katrina Kaif
- Salman Khan
- Arshad Warsi
- R. Madhavan
- Shilpa Shetty
- Preity Zinta
- Anil Kapoor
- Sridevi
- Boney Kapoor

== Casting ==
Priyanka Chopra was the original choice for the lead actress role. However, she opted out of the film to work on another film that too was to be directed by Raj Kumar Santoshi, London Dreams (2009) although she was replaced by Asin Thottumkal in that film. Raj Kumar Santhoshi left that film and Priyanka Chopra was removed from London Dreams.

== Soundtrack ==
The film's music was composed by Singer and Composer Sukhwinder Singh.

- "Jab Tak Hai Dum" – Sukhwinder Singh
- "Shabad Gurbani" – Sukhwinder Singh
- "Is Pal Ki Soch" – Harshdeep Kaur
- "More Haji Piya" – Amjad Farid Sabri
- "Barsan Lagi" – Sneha Pant
- "Halla Bol Theme" – Instrumental
