= Aijaz Ahmad =

Indian Marxist philosopher (1941–2022)

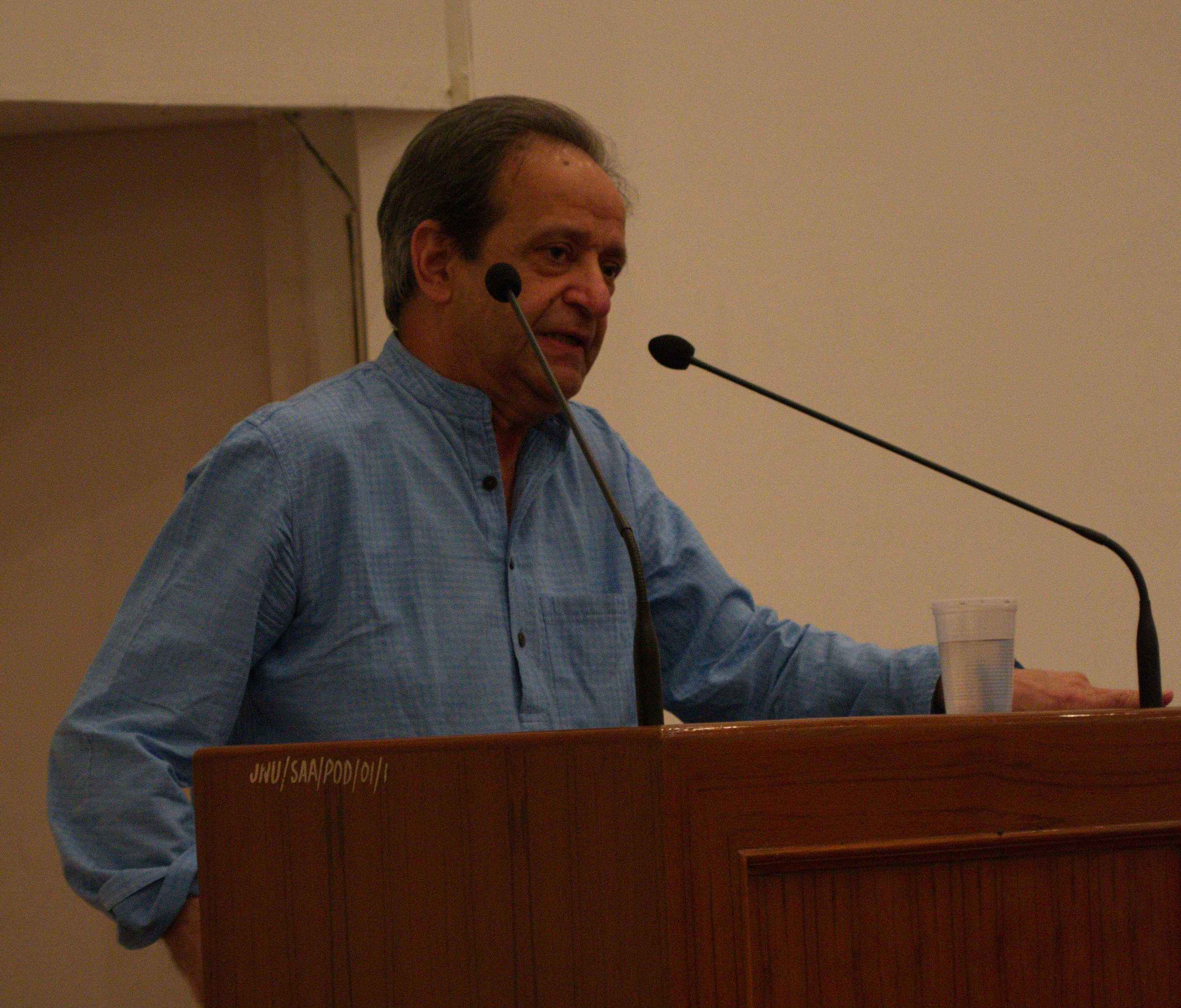
Ahmad delivering a lecture in 2013

Aijaz Ahmad (c. 1941 – 9 March 2022) was an Indian-born Marxist philosopher, literary theorist, and political commentator. He was the Chancellor's Professor at the University of California, Irvine School of Humanities’ Department of Comparative Literature.

== Biography ==
Aijaz Ahmad was born in Muzaffarnagar, British Raj in 1941.

== Academic and journalism career ==
He was a professorial fellow at the Centre of Contemporary Studies, Nehru Memorial Museum and Library, New Delhi, India, visiting professor at the Centre for Political Studies, Jawaharlal Nehru University, New Delhi, and visiting professor of political science at York University, Toronto, Canada. He also worked as an editorial consultant with the Frontline and as a senior news analyst for the news website NewsClick.

== Work ==
In his book In Theory: Classes, Nations, Literatures, Ahmad primarily discusses the role of theory and theorists in the movement against colonialism and imperialism.

== Personal life ==
Ahmad died in Irvine, California, on 9 March 2022, at age 81. He was hospitalised for age-related ailments and had returned home only a few days prior to his death. Rutgers University law professor Adil Ahmad Haque is his son.

== Bibliography ==
1. In Theory: Classes, Nations, Literatures] - Verso, 1992.
2. A World To Win: Essays on the Communist Manifesto - with Irfan Habib and Prabhat Patnaik, LeftWord Books, 1999.
3. Lineages of the Present: Ideological and Political Genealogies of Contemporary South Asia - Verso, 2001.
4. On Communalism and Globalization: Offensives of the Far Right - Three Essays Collective, New Delhi, 2002.
5. Iraq, Afghanistan and the Imperialism of Our Time - LeftWord Books, New Delhi, 2004.
6. In Our Time: Empire, Politics, Culture - Verso, 2007

Edited

1. Ghazals of Ghalib - ed. by Aijaz Ahmad. Oxford India, 1995. (With translations from the Urdu by Aijaz Ahmed, W.S. Merwin, Adrienne Rich, William Stafford, David Ray, Thomas Fitzsimmons, Mark Strand, and William Hunt)
2. A Singular Voice: Collected Writings of Michael Sprinker - Editor (with Fred Pfeil and Modhumita Roy), 2000.
