= LeftWord Books =

Indian publisher

- Status: Active
- Founded: 1999; 27 years ago
- Founder: Prakash Karat
- Country of origin: India
- Headquarters location: New Delhi
- Key people: Sudhanva Deshpande, Vijay Prashad
- Publication types: books
- Nonfiction topics: Leftist views, Marxist theory
- Owner: Communist Party of India (Marxist)
- Official website: http://leftword.com/

LeftWord Books is a New Delhi–based publisher that seeks to reflect the views of the Left in India and South Asia. Its Managing Director is Prakash Karat, the former General Secretary of the Communist Party of India (Marxist), or CPI(M). The Chief Editor is Vijay Prashad and the Managing Editor is the actor-publisher Sudhanva Deshpande.

== History ==
LeftWord Books was founded in 1999 as the publishing division of Naya Rasta Publishers Private Limited. It was conceived by a group of Leftist intellectuals including Prabhat Patnaik, Aijaz Ahmad, Indira Chandrasekhar, Prakash Karat, V. K. Ramachandran and N. Ram and sometimes regarded as "the English publishing arm of the Communist Party of India (Marxist)". It is managed by the Managing Editor Sudhanva Deshpande, who had earlier worked with Tulika Books during 1994 to 1998 and continues to be involved with the theatre group Jana Natya Manch. LeftWord differs from Tulika Books, according to Deshpande, by being explicitly Leftist.

== May Day ==
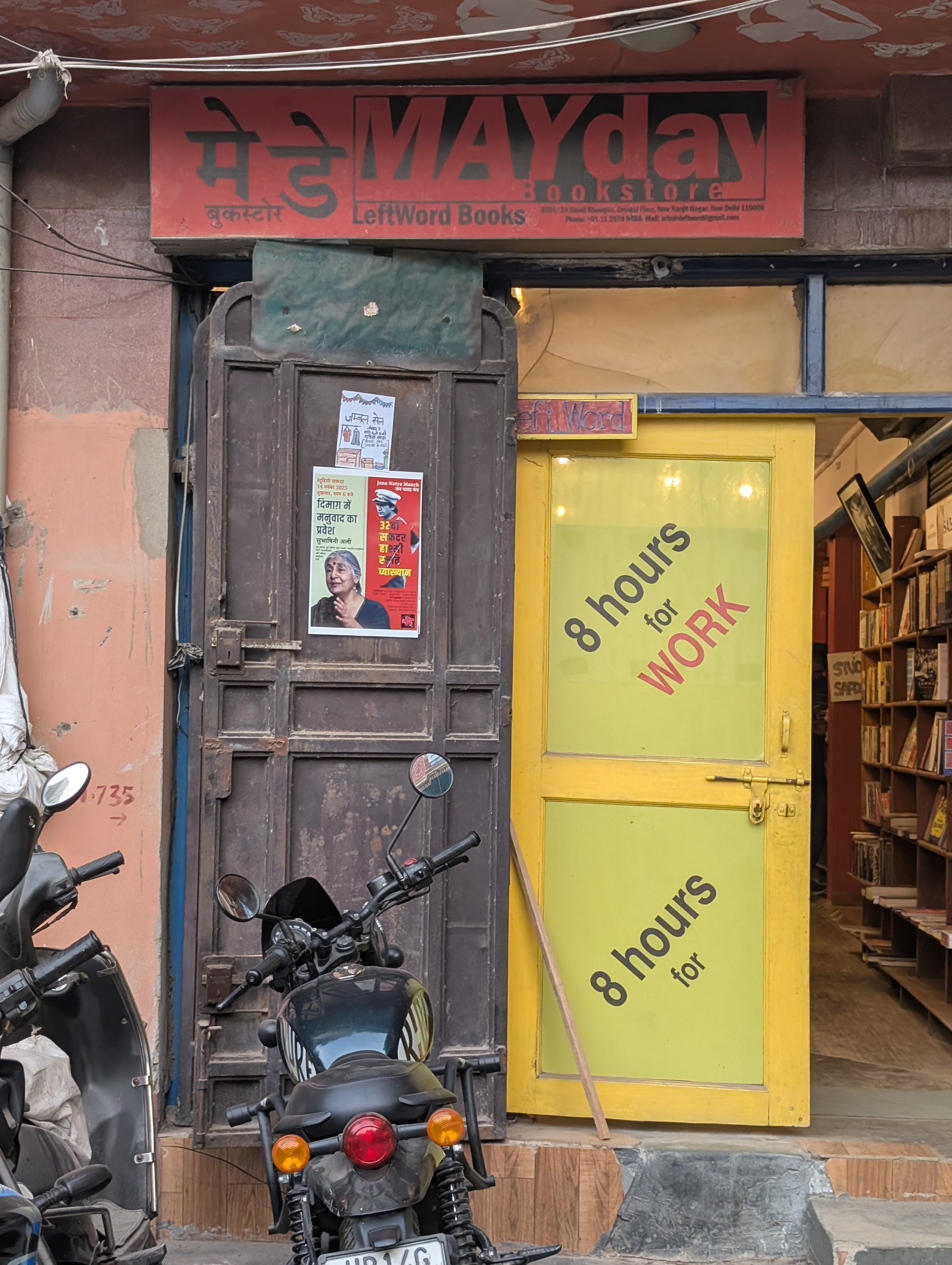
May Day Bookstore from the outside

The company runs the May Day bookstore and cafe in New Delhi, the only left-leaning bookstore in the city, next to the theater space, Studio Safdar. It is in the neighborhood of Shadipur in West Delhi, nearby the Shadipur metro station.

== Internet Retail ==
It sells books via its website from various Leftist publishers including Tulika Books. It also has a membership-based book club, whose subscriptions served to form the seed capital of the publishing division. By mid-2000, the company established itself as a successful publisher with several well-subscribed titles.

== Book series ==
- LeftWord Classics
- SIGNPOST: The Issues that Matter

== Selected titles ==
- Fidel Castro, The Gigantic Casino: Reflections on the World Financial Crisis, ISBN 8187496827.
- Hugo Chavez, The South Also Exists, ISBN 8187496568.
- Carlos Ferrer, Becoming Che, ISBN 8187496800.
- Teo Ballve, Vijay Prashad, Dispatches From Latin America- Experimenting Against Neoliberalism, ISBN 8187496584.
- John Harriss, Depoliticizing Development: The World Bank and Social Capital, ISBN 184331049X (also issued by London: Anthem Press).
- E. M. S. Namboodiripad, History, Society, and Land Relations: Selected Essays, ISBN 8187496924.
- Thomas Isaac, Richard W. Franke, Local Democracy and Development: The Kerala People's Campaign for Decentralized Planning, ISBN 8187496126 (also issued by Rowman & Littlefield, ISBN 0742516075
- Prakash Karat, Subordinate Ally: The Nuclear Deal and India-US Strategic Relations, ISBN 8187496738.
- Harkishan Singh Surjeet, History of the Communist Movement in India, Vol. 1: The Formative Years, 1920-1933, ISBN 8187496495.
- Richard Levins, Talking about Trees: Science, Ecology, and Agriculture in Cuba, ISBN 8187496630.
- Utsa Patnaik, The Agrarian Question In Marx And His Successors, ISBN 8187496606.
- Aijaz Ahmad, Irfan Habib, Prabhat Patnaik, A World To Win: Essays on the Communist Manifesto, ISBN 8187496010.
- A. G. Noorani, The RSS and the BJP: A Division of Labour, ISBN 8187496134.
- A. G. Noorani, Savarkar and Hindutva: The Godse Connection, ISBN 8187496282.
- Dwijendra Narayan Jha, The Many Careers of DD Kosambi, ISBN 9380118066.
- Vijay Prashad, The Darker Nations- A Biography of the Short-Lived Third World, ISBN 8187496665.
- Vijay Prashad, War Against the Planet: the fifth Afghan war, imperialism, and other assorted fundamentalisms, ISBN 8187496193.
- Archana Prashad, Environmentalism and the left: contemporary debates and future agendas in tribal areas, ISBN 8187496444.
- N. Ram, Riding the Nuclear Tiger, ISBN 8187496029.
- Praveen Swami, The Kargil War, ISBN 8187496045.
- Parvathi Menon, Breaking Barriers: Stories of Twelve Women, ISBN 8187496479.
- Ninan Koshy, Under the Empire: India's New Foreign Policy, ISBN 8187496525.
- Govind Deshpande, Selected Writings Of Jotirao Phule, ISBN 8187496215,.
- C. P. Chandrasekhar, Jayati Ghosh, The market that failed: a decade of neoliberal economic reforms in India, ISBN 8187496207.
- Prabir Purkayastha, Ninan Koshy, M. K. Bhadrakumar, Uncle Sam's Nuclear Cabin, ISBN 8187496746.
- Madhura Swaminathan, Weakening welfare: the public distribution of food in India, ISBN 8187496088.
- Githa Hariharan, From India to Palestine — Essays in Solidarity, ISBN 978-93-80118-20-8.
- K. Chandru, Listen to My Case!, ISBN 9788194475934
