= Adil Ahmad Haque =

American legal scholar (born 1979/1980)

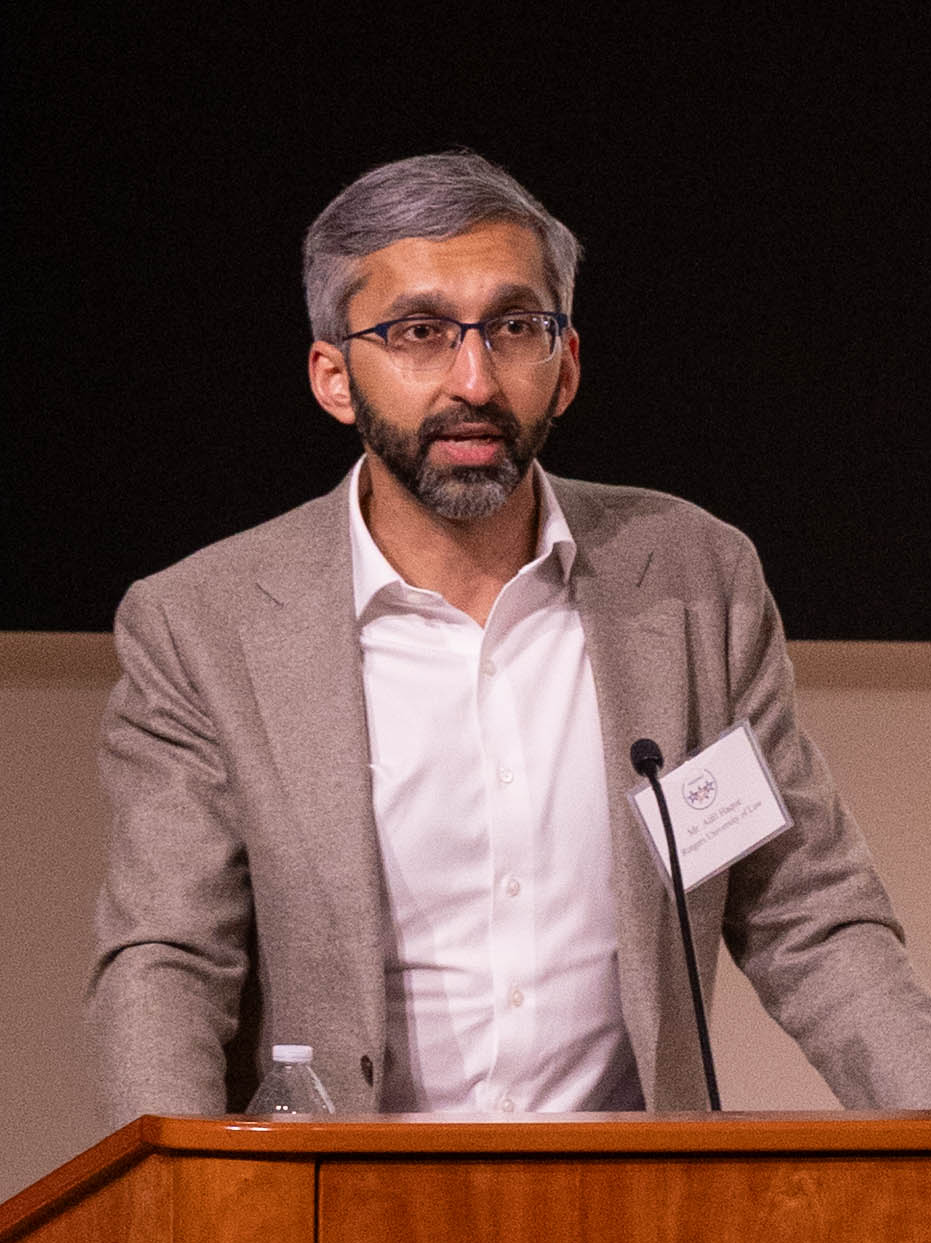
Haque in 2025

Adil Ahmad Haque (born 1979/1980) is a professor of law and Judge Jon O. Newman Scholar at Rutgers University. His scholarship focuses on the international law of armed conflict and the philosophy of international law. His first book, Law and Morality at War, was published by Oxford University Press in 2017. He is also an executive editor of Just Security, based at the Reiss Center on Law and Security in NYU Law School. His father, Aijaz Ahmad, was comparative literature scholar.

== Works ==
- Haque, Adil Ahmad (2017). Law and Morality at War. Oxford University Press. ISBN 978-0-19-968739-8.
