= Frontline (magazine) =

Fortnightly Indian English-language magazine

- 1 November 2013 front page of Frontline
- Type: Fortnightly magazine
- Owner: The Hindu Group
- Editor-in-chief: Vaishna Roy
- Founded: December 1984
- Language: English
- Headquarters: Chennai, India
- ISSN: 0970-1710
- Website: frontline.thehindu.com

Frontline is a fortnightly English language news magazine published by The Hindu Group of publications headquartered in Chennai, India. Vaishna Roy is the editor of the magazine. It is a news and views magazine that provides in-depth coverage on various topics such as politics, world affairs, culture, science, health, business and personalities. Frontline gives coverage to developmental issues and issues related to the working classes, unorganized sectors, tribal regions and other under-served regions in India.

== History ==
Frontline was first published in December 1984. It was originally intended to be a newspaper when it was started by the founders. They later had differences of opinion regarding the content and intent of the publication, and the magazine was sold to PL Investments Ltd, which later sold it to The Hindu Group.

== Contributors and perspective ==
The magazine's long-serving editor was R. Vijaya Sankar, who retired in May 2022. The magazine's regular contributors include well-known progressive writers such as C.P. Chandrasekhar, Praful Bidwai, Jayati Ghosh, Hassnain Riza and Bhaskar Ghose. Aijaz Ahmad, the late Marxist literary critic and political analyst, contributed to the magazine on various topics. Vijay Prashad, the Marxist historian, used to be a regular columnist who sent the "Letter from America" piece for the magazine, as well as reported on American issues. R. Ramachandran is the magazine's long-time contributor to the Science and Health segments.

Frontline is noted for its thorough and rigorous coverage of issues, its long-form interviews, essays and columns. Aijaz Ahmed has called it the "best English language newsmagazine anywhere in the world".

Since 1991, the magazine has opposed the economic reforms of successive governments that encouraged disinvestment in state-owned corporations, and the opening up of areas like telecom and insurance to private and foreign players, among others.

== Awards ==
Regular correspondent Dionne Bunsha received the Ramnath Goenka in 2007 for outstanding reporting in the field of environment and books. Journalist P. Sainath, a frequent contributor to Frontline, won the 2007 Ramon Magsaysay Award in the fields of creative arts, journalism and communication.

Other journalists such as Asha Krishnakumar and Praveen Swami are also recipients of prestigious awards in journalism, such as the Lorenzo Natali Media Prize.

== See also ==
- The Hindu Business Line
