= National Voice =

- Country: India
- Broadcast area: India

Programming
- Picture format: 576i, SDTV 16:9

Ownership
- Owner: Deepak Sharma

History
- Launched: May 2016

Links
- Website: http://nationalvoice.co.in

National Voice is Hindi-language television news channel.
