= Deshbandhu Gupta =

Indian freedom fighter and legislator and journalist (1901–1951)

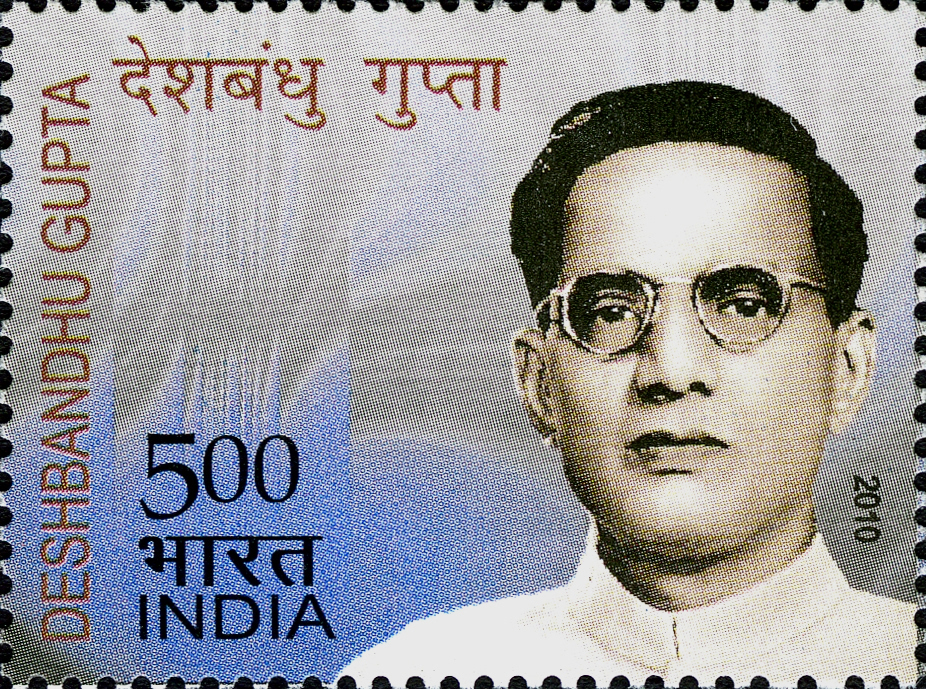
- A Commemorative stamp on Deshbandhu Gupta issued by the Government of India

Member of Punjab Provincial Assembly
- In office 1937–1945
- Constituency: South-Eastern Towns

Member of Constituent Assembly of India
- In office 9 December 1946 – 24 January 1950

Personal details
- Born: Rati Ram Gupta; 14 June 1901 Panipat, Haryana, India
- Died: 21 November 1951 (aged 50) Kolkata, West Bengal, India
- Party: Indian National Congress
- Spouse: Sona Devi
- Children: 9
- Education: St. Stephen's College, Delhi
- Occupation: Freedom fighter; politician; journalist
- Known for: Advocacy for freedom of the press, championing assembly status for National Capital Territory of Delhi, supporting the separation of Punjab and Haryana

Deshbandhu Gupta (14 June 1901 – 21 November 1951), also known as Lala Deshbandhu Gupta, was an Indian freedom fighter, politician, and journalist. He served as a member of the Punjab Provincial Assembly, having won the 1937 election representing the Indian National Congress. He was also a member of the Constituent Assembly of India.

He championed the cause of ensuring freedom of the press and actively advocated for the assembly status of the National Capital Territory of Delhi. Additionally, he actively supported the separation of Punjab and Haryana, and he was the first to initiate the independence movement of Haryana. The Government of India's postal department issued a commemorative stamp in his honor in 2010.

== Early life and education ==
He was born as Rati Ram Gupta on 14 June 1901 in the Badi Pahad area of Panipat. His father, Shadiram, was a petition writer and a Vedic scholar who also wrote Urdu prose and poetry.

Gupta completed his elementary education at a madrasa in Panipat and later pursued his studies at St. Stephen's College, Delhi. At St. Stephen's, he was taught by Charles Indridge and Ghosh, while SK Rudra served as the principal. During his time at the college, Gupta briefly worked as an assistant for Jamnalal Bajaj, a cloth merchant at Chandni Chowk, for a period of 18 days.

During this period, significant events such as the Jallianwala Bagh massacre unfolded, leaving a lasting impact on the public's collective memory and on young Rati Ram Gupta in particular. As a consequence, after attending a Non-Cooperation Conference led by Mahatma Gandhi in Bhiwani on 22 October 1920, Deshbandhu Gupta felt inspired to actively participate in the struggle for India's freedom from British rule. He informed the college principal, S.K. Rudra, of his decision to leave St. Stephen's. Given Rudra's sympathy towards the revolutionary cause, he accepted Gupta's request and even encouraged the young Rati Ram to make the most of his choice to serve the freedom struggle.

Swami Shraddhanand and Mahatma Gandhi gave him the title "deshbandhu" (friend of the nation), which became his commonly used name.

== Independence movement ==
Deshbandhu Gupta actively participated in the Non-cooperation movement, playing a significant role in mobilizing the people of Delhi to boycott various symbols of British rule. He encouraged active participation among the masses. As a result of his involvement, Gupta endured a year of rigorous imprisonment from 1921 to 1922. He was 19 years old when he was jailed for the first time.

During the Civil disobedience movement, Gupta continued to demonstrate his support. He advocated for the boycott of foreign clothing, promoting the concept of 'Swadeshi' and endorsing locally made products. Gupta served as the editor of the newspaper Daily Tej and was apprehended on 8 October 1923, due to his revolutionary writings. His wife Sona Devi and son Vishwa Bandhu Gupta (later a Member of Parliament, Rajya Sabha) were also imprisoned for their participation in the Civil Disobedience Movement. Deshbandhu Gupta and his family took on the crucial responsibility of leading and organizing the Civil Disobedience movement in Delhi.

Although Gupta later assumed a position in the Municipal Corporation of Delhi, he chose to resign from his role in order to join Jugal Kishore Khanna in the struggle against British colonial rule. In 1942, he was detained under the Defense of India Rules for his active involvement in the Quit India Movement.

== Political career ==
Gupta faced political incarceration on multiple occasions due to his active involvement in the freedom struggle. After being released from jail in 1927, Gupta campaigned for the separation of Haryana and Punjab, receiving support from individuals such as Ranbir Singh Hooda.

Within the freedom movement, Gupta had associations with prominent figures like Lala Lajpat Rai and Swami Shraddhanand. Lajpat Rai, his teacher at the Tilak School of Politics, became his confidante.

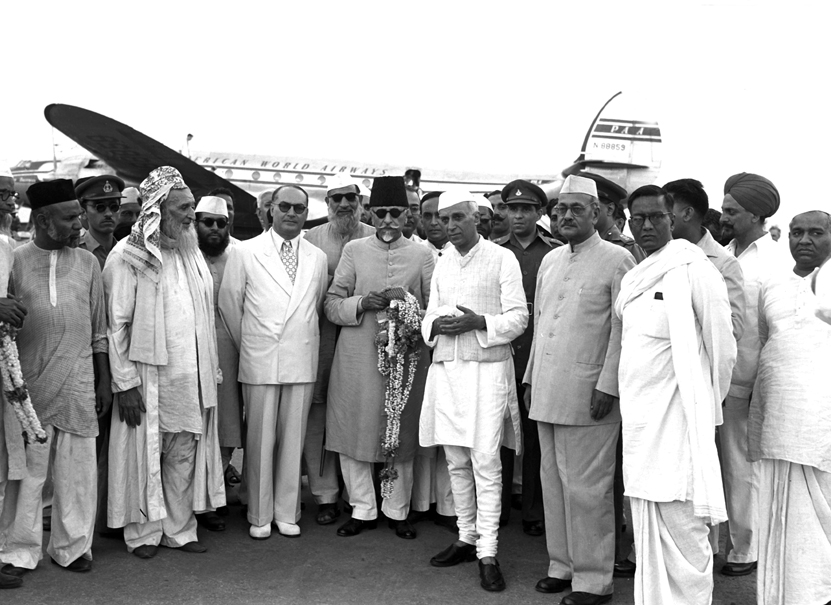
Maulana Abul Kalam Azad, H.E. Noury Esfandiary, Jawaharlal Nehru, Dr. Tara Chand, and Lala Deshbandhu Gupta, among others, arrived at Palam Airport on 19 July 1951.

Gupta once addressed a gathering in Delhi upon the request of the women's wing of the Indian National Congress (INC). However, the British government deemed the content of his speech objectionable and subsequently banned him from addressing any further gatherings in Delhi. As a result, Lajpat Rai assigned him the task of organizing Congress committees in Karnal, which was the tehsil encompassing his birthplace, Panipat.

The Government of India Act 1935 was passed as a result of deliberations during the Third Round Table Conference in London, held in November 1932. The act aimed to establish an All India Federation and introduce new governance models for the provinces. Although the act granted greater provincial administrative power to Indians, crucial departments such as defense and foreign relations remained under British control. Despite their opposition to the act's provisions, the Indian National Congress proceeded with elections and formed governments in seven out of eleven provinces by July 1937, with coalition governments in two additional provinces. Only Bengal and Punjab had non-Congress governments, with Punjab being ruled by the Unionist Party and Bengal by the Krishak Praja Party-Muslim League coalition. In the legislative assembly elections in Punjab on 18 February, only Lala Deshbandhu Gupta and Pandit Shriram Sharma won seats from the INC. Deshbandhu Gupta served in the Punjab Provincial Assembly (British India) for seven years and was later elected as an MP from Delhi.

He served as the secretary of the Delhi Congress Committee in 1921 and later became the president of the Delhi Congress Committee in 1947. In 1925, Gupta was elected to the Delhi Municipal Committee and held the position of deputy leader of the Congress Party within the committee for nearly 20 years. In 1947, he became a member of the Chief Commissioner's Advisory Council and later served as its vice president. He also served as a member of various sub-committees in the Parliament. He also held several important positions within the Indian National Congress during his political career.

Apart from his political activities, Deshbandhu Gupta's services during the riots between Hindus and Muslims in 1923, 1926, and 1936 were well-regarded within the local community. He consistently appeared on the scene and played a vital role in promoting peace and harmony between the two communities. Also, during the communal riots in Delhi at the time of Partition, he undertook visits to various parts of the city with the objective of addressing divisive influences and fostering a sense of communal harmony.

=== Constituent Assembly ===
He was elected to the Constituent Assembly of India from Delhi as a member of the Indian National Congress. As both a journalist and Constituent Assembly member, he is known to have staunchly supported freedom of the Press in India, as especially evidenced in the debates surrounding the (then) entry 88-A in the Assembly draft, held in September 1949. He voiced his concerns about the imposition of taxes on newspapers and emphasized the need for them to be treated differently from other industries.

On 30 July 1947, the Constituent Assembly convened to discuss the constitutional status of Centrally Administered Provinces, including Delhi, Ajmer, Coorg, Andaman and Nicobar, and others. These provinces presented challenges due to their small size, limited population, and scarce economic resources, making separate administrations impractical. To address this issue, a motion was proposed by Deshbandhu Gupta, leading to the formation of a seven-member committee headed by Bhogaraju Pattabhi Sitaramayya. The committee was tasked with studying the matter comprehensively and submitting a report. Deshbandhu Gupta also served as a committee member of the Sitaramayya Committee. The committee swiftly conducted three productive meetings and submitted its report to President Dr. Rajendra Prasad on 21 October 1947. The committee acted promptly due to Gupta's familiarity with Delhi's history, culture, and institutions, indicating a potential interest in a role within the new administration.

Deshbandhu Gupta was involved in the matter of assembly status for Delhi. He advocated for the establishment of a responsible government in Delhi, which put him in opposition to B.R. Ambedkar's stance. Dr. Ambedkar supported granting special status to the National Capital Territory (NCT). Despite facing repeated rejections from the Government of India to grant Delhi equal status to other units of the Indian Union, Gupta tenaciously pursued his cause through his newspapers, parliamentary speeches, and resolutions presented in the Chief Commissioner's Advisory Council. Eventually, Delhi did obtain an assembly, but it became a special Union Territory rather than a full-fledged state. Gupta is believed to have played a crucial role in securing this achievement, making him a potential candidate for the position of the first Chief Minister of Delhi.

== Contribution to journalism ==
Deshbandhu Gupta was a noted journalist, who served as an editor for Lala Lajpat Rai's newspaper Vande Mataram. Later, in collaboration with Swami Shraddhanand, an Arya Samaj missionary, he established the newspaper Daily Tej, which was published in Urdu as the Rozana Tej. After the death of Swami Shraddhanand on 23 December 1926, Desh Bandhu took over the management of the newspaper until his own passing.

He also served as a co-chair of the Indian News Chronicle alongside Ramnath Goenka, who acquired stakes in the company. Following Deshbandhu's demise, Goenka renamed the newspaper as The Indian Express.

Gupta served as the President of the All-India Newspaper Editors' Conference. Furthermore, in 1950, he assumed the role of President of the Indian and Eastern Newspaper Society.

After Deshbandhu Gupta's death in 1951, his son Vishwabandhu Gupta took over the leadership of Daily Tej and expanded its portfolio. It launched Deewana Tej, a popular bilingual satirical magazine that gained prominence in the 1960s. They also introduced The Weekly Sun, India's first political and youth tabloid, which captivated the younger generation throughout the 1970s and 80s. Additionally, it published the Northeast Sun, an English magazine with a substantial readership in the North East region of India and neighboring countries. In 2023, Tej completed a century of its existence.

== Personal life ==
At the age of 19, Deshbandhu Gupta married Sona Devi, who was 17 years old. Their matrimonial alliance had been arranged since Gupta was five years old and she was three. Gupta and Sona Devi had four sons named Vishwabandhu Gupta, Prembandhu Gupta, Ramesh Gupta, and Satish Gupta, as well as five daughters named Vimla Gupta, Nirmala Gupta, Urmila Gupta, Sarla Gupta, and Manjula Gupta.

== Death ==
On 21 November 1951, Deshbandhu Gupta was scheduled to attend a convention in Calcutta. Initially, his seat on the plane was not confirmed. However, due to unforeseen circumstances, Devdas Gandhi had to cancel his own travel plans for some urgent work in Delhi. So Deshbandhu Gupta got the seat instead. The plane crashed near the Calcutta airport and everyone on board, including Deshbandhu Gupta, lost their lives.

Pandit Jawahar Lal Nehru, the Prime minister of India was among the pallbearers during Deshbandhu Gupta's funeral. On that occasion, it is noted that Nehru said, "Aaj Dilli sooni ho gayi hai," which can be roughly translated as "Delhi has become silent today."

His appointment as the first Chief Minister of Delhi was confirmed, but he died in an air crash before he could be sworn in.

== Commemoration ==
In June 2010, the Government of India issued a commemorative postage stamp and a first day cover to honor the birth anniversary of Lala Desh Bandhu Gupta. On 12 August 2010, the Prime Minister of India Manmohan Singh released the postage stamp.

Deshbandhu College, a constituent college of the University of Delhi, was established in 1953 by the Ministry of Rehabilitation and named after Deshbandhu Gupta as a tribute. There is a government college, Deshbandhu Gupta Government PG College, located in Panipat, Haryana, which is named after Deshbandhu Gupta. In 1956, the Municipal Corporation of Delhi installed a statue of Deshbandhu Gupta at Ajmeri Gate, Delhi, which was unveiled by Syed Mahmud, the then Minister of External Affairs.

In August 2008, the Government of Haryana, under the leadership of Bhupinder Singh Hooda, established a state-level award in honor of Lala Deshbandhu Gupta, with a monetary value of ₹1 lakh. The award is bestowed upon individuals who have made exceptional contributions to the field of writing about the freedom fighters in Haryana. This award is established under the auspices of Haryana Sahitya Akademi.

A statue of Lala Deshbandhu was unveiled by the college administration of Deshbandhu College on 6 August 2022, in the presence of his family members, as a commemorative gesture to honor his contributions. Desh, a student magazine of Deshbandhu College, was started as a commemoration to honor Deshbandhu Gupta. A road in Delhi's Karol Bagh is named after him.

== See also ==
- List of Indian independence activists
- List of people from Haryana
