= ANHAD =

Organization

- Formation: March 2003
- Type: NGO
- Purpose: human rights, democratic rights as enshrined in the Constitution of India, secularism
- Headquarters: Canning Lane, New Delhi - 1
- Region served: India

ANHAD (Act Now for Harmony and Democracy) is a socio-cultural organization established in March 2003, as a response to 2002 Gujarat riots. Social activist Shabnam Hashmi, sister of the slain activist Safdar Hashmi and founder of SAHMAT, Marxian historian Prof. K N Panikkar and social activist Harsh Mander are the founding members of ANHAD. Based in Delhi, ANHAD works in the field of secularism, human rights and communal harmony. ANHAD's activities include secular mobilization, sensitizing people about their democratic rights as enshrined in Indian Constitution, research and publication of books and reports, welfare programs for marginalised sections of society, launching creative mass mobilization campaigns. People's tribunals. It also work as a pressure group among political circle to take action against communalism. ANHAD plays a major role in Gujarat to fight against human right violations, as well as in the Kashmir Valley.

ANHAD is registered as a trust and has six trustees as of now: They are Shabnam Hashmi, Aban Raza, Amrita Nandy, Harsh Mander, Shubha Menon and Mukhtar Shaikh.

== History ==
The organisation works with victims of communal violence, and in 2005, ANHAD rehabilitated 25 children from the 2002 Gujarat riots in Delhi. Initially they lived in Apna Ghar hostel in Jaitpur on Delhi's outskirts, later shifted to a new hostel, Bal Sahyog, in Connaught Place, the children study at Balwant Rai Mehta School in Greater Kailash II. It took the initiative in screening the film Parzania in Gujarat in April 2007. The film based on a Parsi family who lost their son during the 2002 Gujarat riots, was not screened in the state, upon its nationwide release in January, as the cinema owners feared backlash.

In July 2010, in a statement, ANHAD said, "“The presence of the Army and security forces dominates the (Srinagar) Valley and reinforces the deep-rooted angst of people. The reality is that democracy is under severe strain and is almost absent in many parts in the State, despite an elected government backed by the Centre holding the reigns [sic] of power in Srinagar".

ANHAD filed a plea against the Delhi Police in Batla house encounter case.

== Reports published by ANHAD ==
- Interim Report of Independent People's Tribunal on Human Rights Violations in Kashmir
- Systematic discrimination oozing out of the pores in Gujarat
- National Meet on Status of Muslims: Summary of Findings and Recommendations
- 26/11 Mumbai
- 5 Years of ANHAD: 2003-2008
- Visit to Orissa
- ANHAD in Kashmir
- State Ka Order Hai
- Interim Observations - Tribunal On Atrocities Against Minorities
- Selected Testimonies: Tribunal on the Atrocities against Minorities in the Name of Fighting Terrorism
- Citizen's Fact Finding Report on Dhule Riots

To support the proposed Women's Reservation Bill, ANHAD along with the support of various other organizations, organized a nationwide campaign called "Reservation Express" in 2009, which involved three caravans travelling through the country, apart from Campaign, public meetings, conferences and cultural programmes.

== See also ==
- Human rights organisation
- Civil society organisation
