= Shabnam Hashmi =

Indian social activist and human rights campaigner

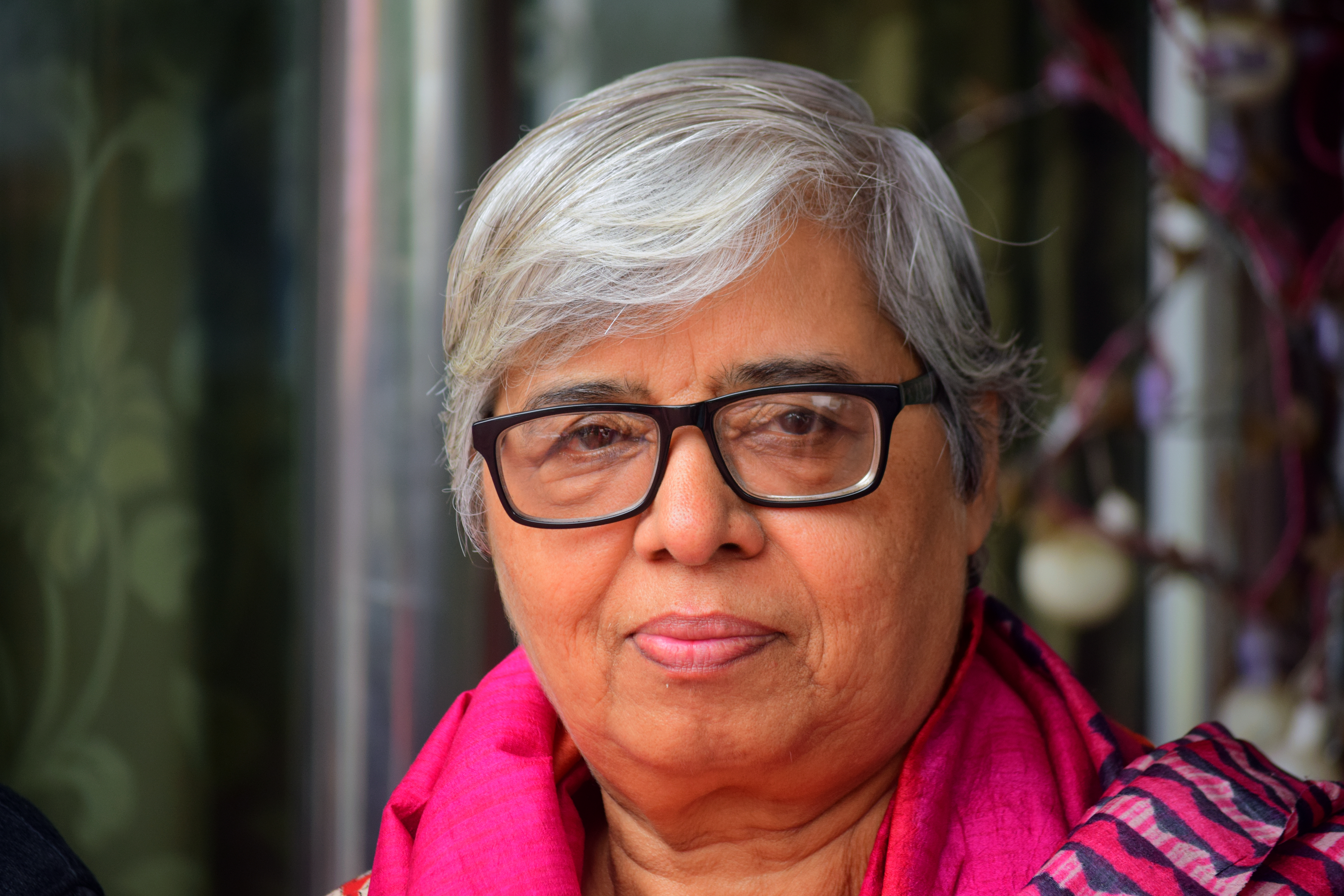
- Occupations: Indian social activist and human rights campaigner
- Known for: Draft Committee member of the "Communal Violence Bill"
- Relatives: Safdar Hashmi (brother); Sohail Hashmi (brother); Saba Azad (niece)

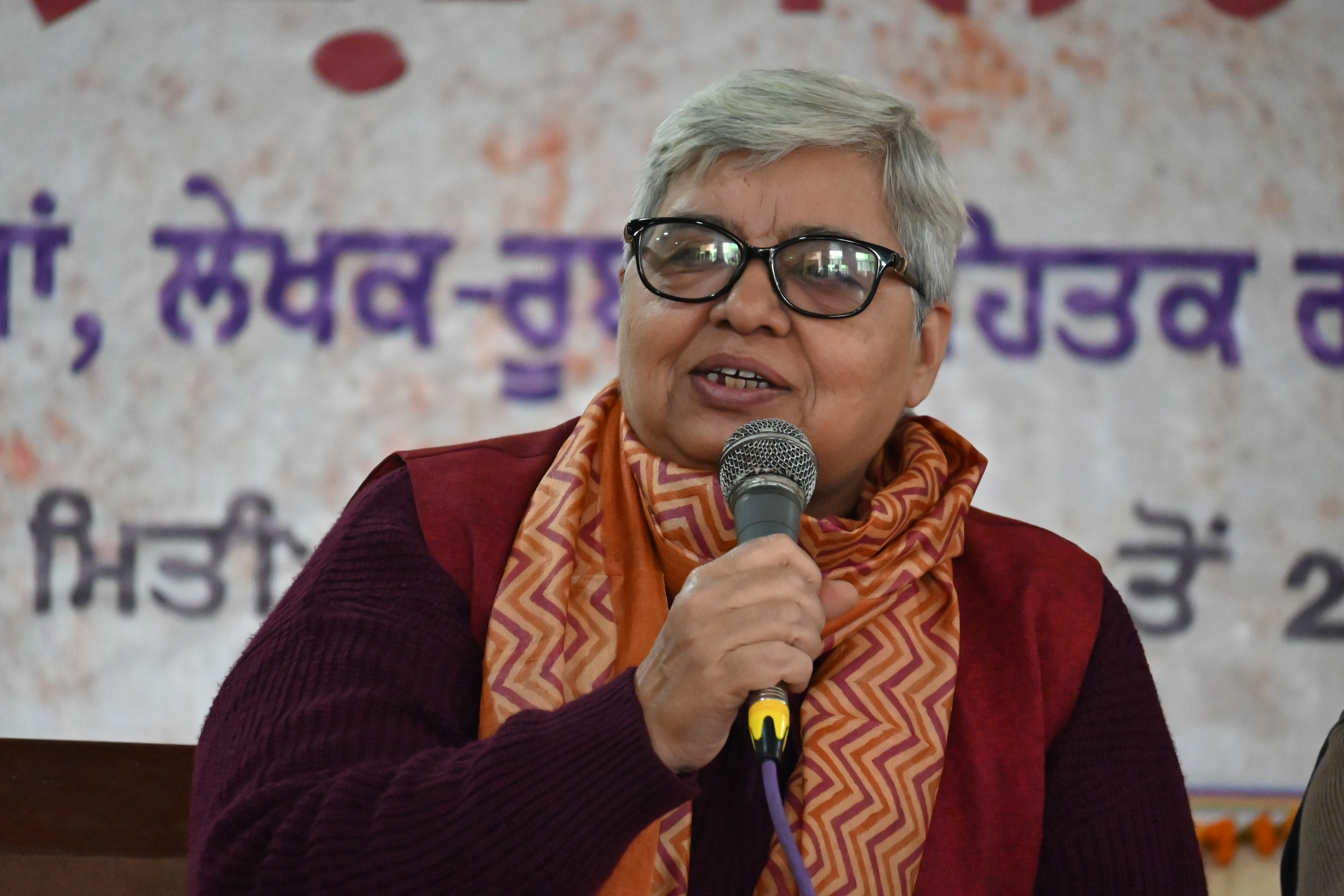

Shabnam Hashmi (born 1957) is an Indian social activist and human rights campaigner. She is the sister of Safdar Hashmi and Sohail Hashmi. Safdar Hashmi was a communist playwright and director, best known for his work with street theatre in India.

== Early life ==
She started her social activism campaigning about adult literacy in 1981. Since 1989 she has spent most of her time in combating communal and fundamentalist forces in India. After the Gujarat riots of 2002, Hashmi changed her focus to grass roots work and has spent a considerable amount of time in Gujarat. In 2003 she was one of the founders of ANHAD (Act Now for Harmony and Democracy), which she administers. Their FCRA license was cancelled based on for working against right-wing violence. She also works in Kashmir, Bihar and Mewat area of Haryana.

Hashmi has focused on issues of women's political participation, adoption, gender justice, democracy and secularism.

She was awarded the Association for Communal Harmony in Asia (ACHA) Star Award for Communal Harmony in 2005, Aamil Smriti Samman in 2005 and the National Minority Rights Award 2008 by the National Minority Commission.

== See also ==
- Peace and Conflict
- Social Activist
- Minority Rights
