= Jana Natya Manch =

New Delhi-based amateur theatre company

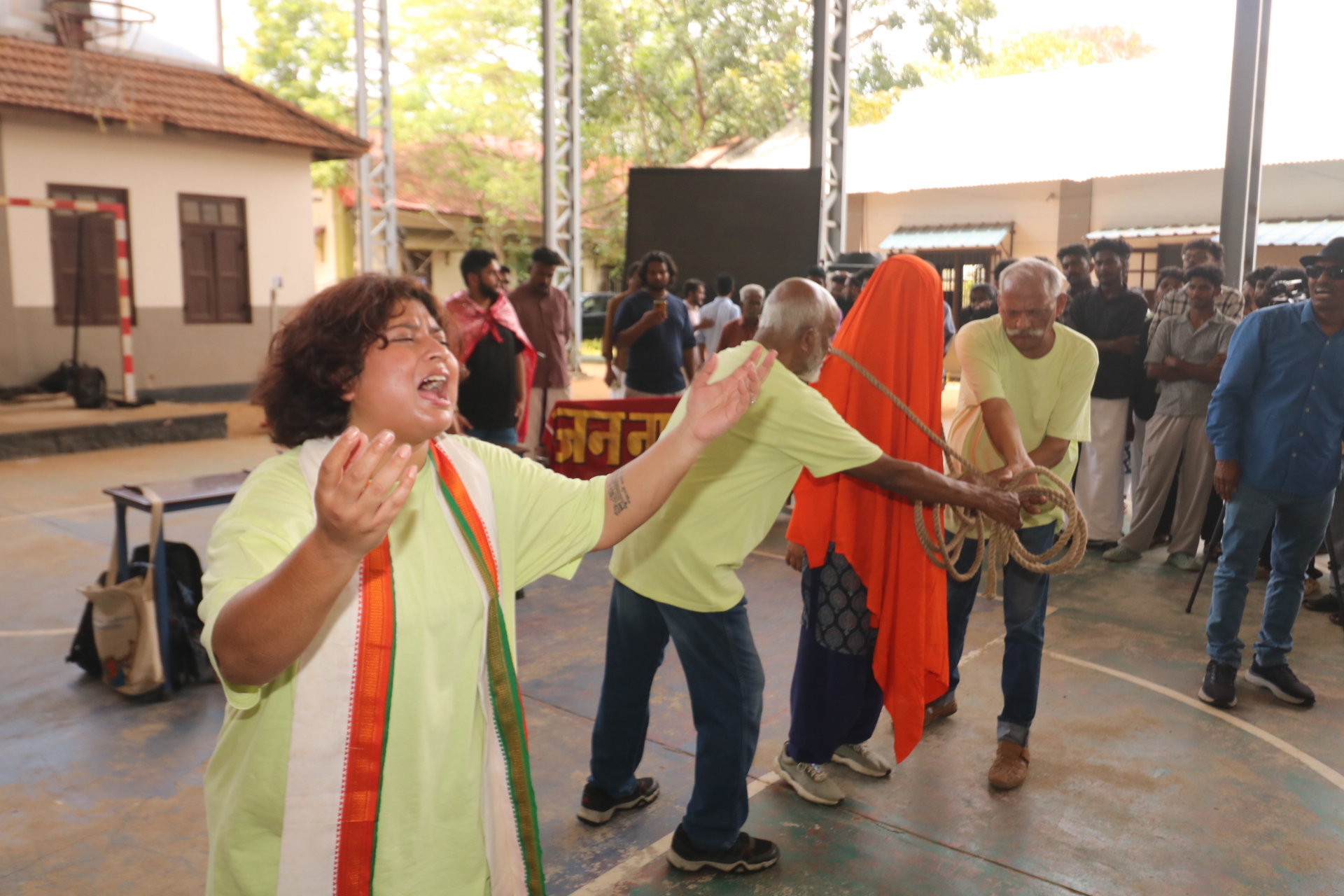
- Jannatyamanch at CPIM State meet 2025 at Kollam
- Formation: 1973
- Type: Theatre group
- Purpose: Theatre and arts
- Location: New Delhi, India

Jana Natya Manch (People's Theatre Front; Janam for short) is a New Delhi–based amateur theatre company specialising in left-wing street theatre in Hindi. It was founded in 1973 by a group of Delhi's radical theatre amateurs who sought to take theatre to the people. Theatre personality Safdar Hashmi is the best-known figure associated with the troupe.

Janam collects donations after each performance and funds its work in this manner. As a matter of policy, the group does not accept donations or grants from state, corporate or NGO agencies. The company does street as well as open-air proscenium performances, and also occasionally organises talks, discussions, workshops, exhibitions, film shows, etc.

The company has performed its plays in festivals organised by Prithvi Theatre (Mumbai), National School of Drama (New Delhi), Sahitya Kala Parishad (New Delhi), Natrang Pratishthan (New Delhi), Sangeet Natak Akademi (Kerala), Natya Akademi (West Bengal) and others.

So far this group of self-trained actors has done over 8,500 performances of nearly 80-odd street plays and 16 proscenium plays in about 140 cities in India. The company has performed outside India once, in spring 2007, when they toured the United States, performing, lecturing and conducting workshops on several university and colleges campuses.

== Early history ==
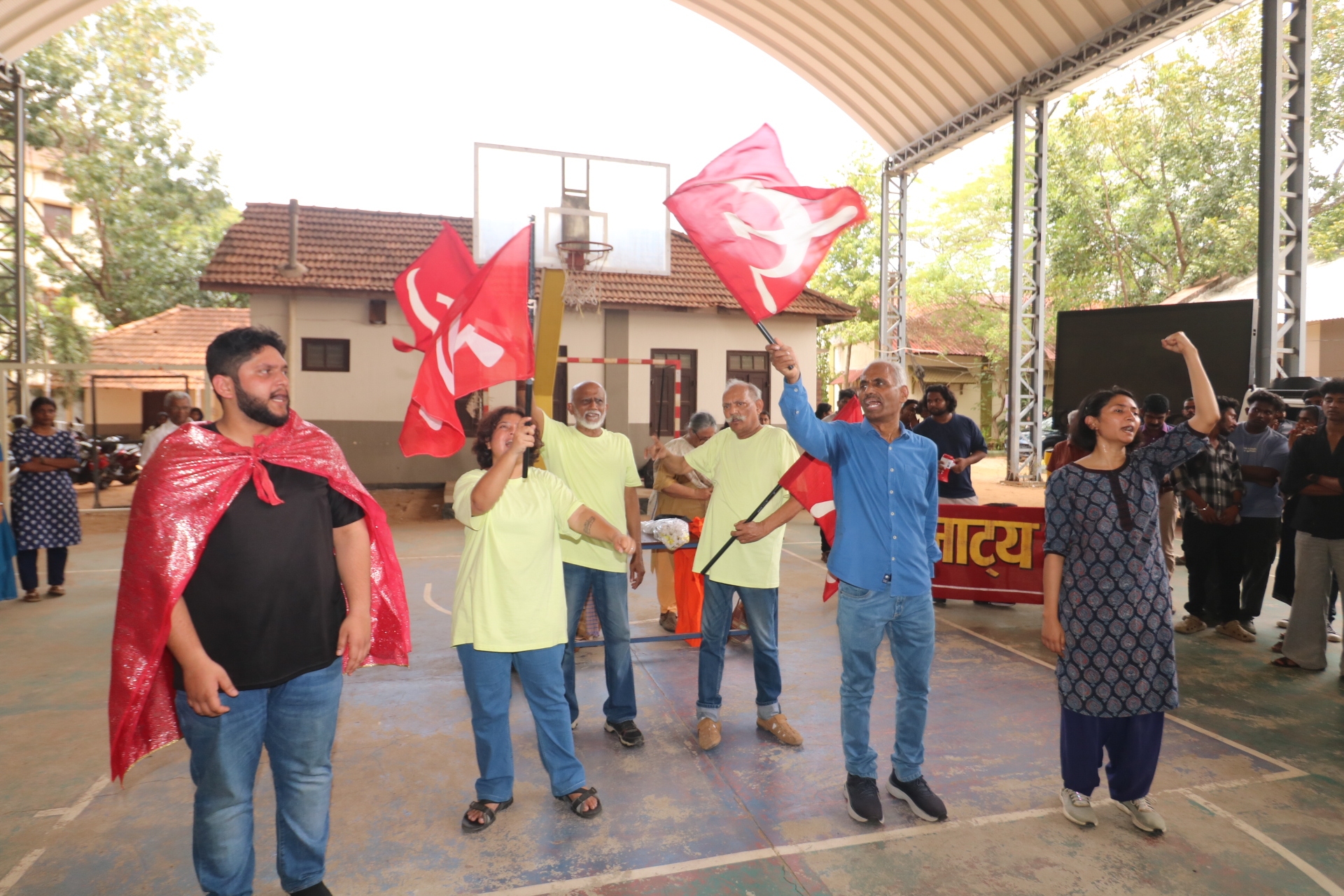
Jannatyamanch at CPIM State meet 2025 at Kollam

Janam was founded in 1973 by a group of Delhi's left-wing theatre amateurs, who sought to take theatre to the people. It was inspired by the spirit of the Indian People's Theatre Association (IPTA). Its early plays, though initially designed for the proscenium, were performed on makeshift stages and chaupals in the big and small towns and villages of North India. It also experimented with street skits.

Janam's street theatre journey began in October 1978. The first play Machine with lyrical, stylised dialogues depicted the exploitation of industrial labour. Janam has played a significant role in popularising street theatre as a form of voicing anger and public opinion. It has done plays on price rise, elections, communalism, economic policy, unemployment, trade union rights, globalisation, women's rights, education system, etc. Some of its best-known street plays are Hatyare, Samrath ko Nahi Dosh Gosain, Aurat, Raja ka Baja, Apaharan Bhaichare Ka, Halla Bol, Mat Banto Insaan Ko, Sangharsh Karenge Jitenge, Andhera Aaftaab Mangega, Jinhe Yakeen Nahin Tha, Aartanaad, Rahul Boxer, Nahin Qabul, Voh Bol Uthi and Yeh Dil Mange More Guruji.

This form of theatre has become a vital cultural tool for workers, revolutionaries and social activists. Street theatre addresses topical events and social phenomenon and takes them straight to peoples’ places of work and residence.

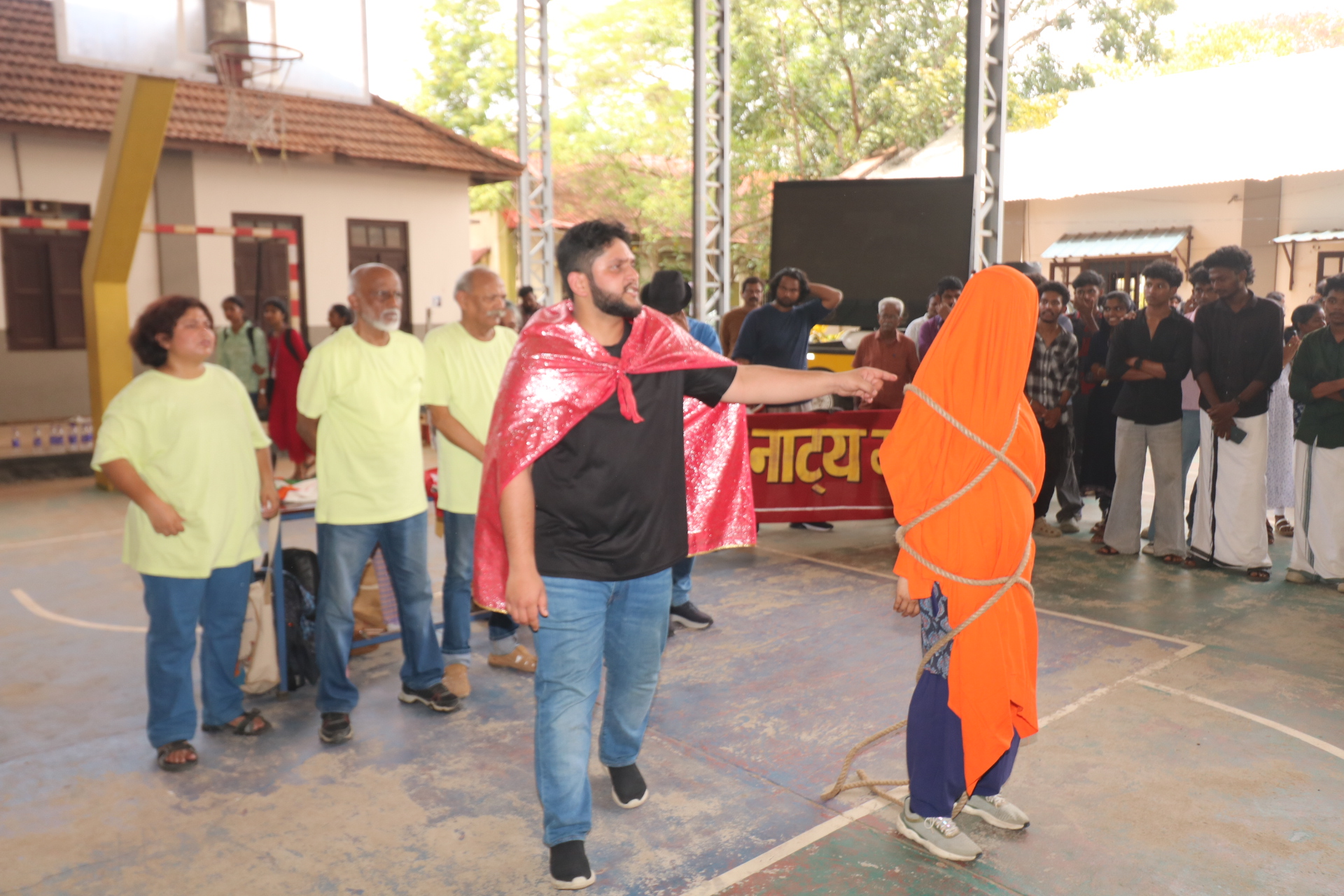
Jannatyamanch at CPIM State meet 2025 at Kollam

== Safdar Hashmi ==
Safdar Hashmi was Janam's Convenor, who was killed in performance in 1989. The attack on Janam took place on 1 January that year, in Sahibabad, an industrial township on the outskirts of Delhi. The play being performed was Halla Bol, in support of workers' demands. This play, and its previous version Chakka Jam, were both done in support of a seven-day strike of industrial workers in November 1988. A spectator, Ram Bahadur, was also killed in the attack. There were massive protests all over the country following this murder and these protests led eventually to the formation of the Safdar Hashmi Memorial Trust (Sahmat) in Delhi.

Hashmi, a founder member of Janam, was a brilliant theoretician and practitioner of political theatre, especially street theatre. A versatile personality, he was a playwright, a lyricist, a theatre director, a designer and an organiser. He also wrote for children. His film scripts were much acclaimed. He wrote on various aspects of culture and related issues in journals and newspapers. Safdar was a member of the C.P.I. (M). In recognition of his contribution to the street theatre movement and to the growth of a democratic culture, the University of Calcutta in 1989 conferred on Safdar the degree of D.Litt. posthumously.

Safdar was born to Haneef Hashmi and Qamar Azad on 12 April 1954 in Delhi. He spent his childhood in Aligarh and finished his schooling in Delhi. He did his M.A. in English literature from University of Delhi. After short stints of teaching in the universities of Garhwal, Kashmir and Delhi he worked in the Press Institute of India and then joined as the Press Information Officer of the Govt. of West Bengal in Delhi. In 1984 he gave up his job to work full-time as a political cultural activist. In 1980, Habib Tanvir directed the play Moti Ram ka Satyagraha for Janam.

Every year, Janam and CITU jointly organise an event to commemorate Hashmi's martyrdom at Jhandapur, at the same place where the 1989 attack had taken place.

== Janam after Safdar ==
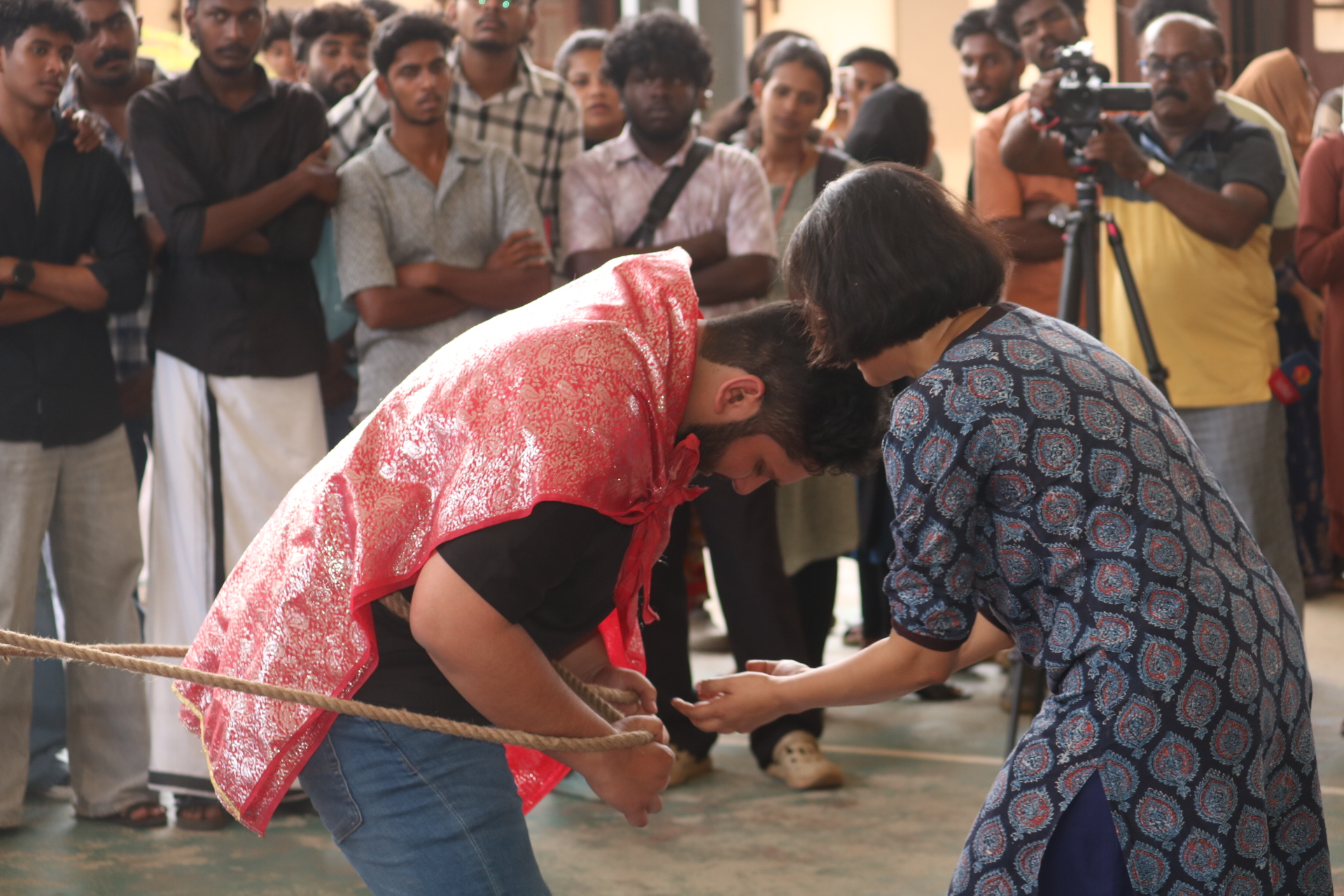
Jannatyamanch at CPIM State meet 2025 at Kollam

Since 1989 Janam has been engaged in both street and proscenium theatre (including Moteram ka Satyagraha, Satyashodhak, Varun ke Bete, Hum Yahin Rahenge, Ek Aurat Hypatia Bhi Thi). In 1993 it began a bilingual theatre quarterly Nukkad Janam Samvaad and also instituted the Safdar Hashmi Memorial Lecture series.

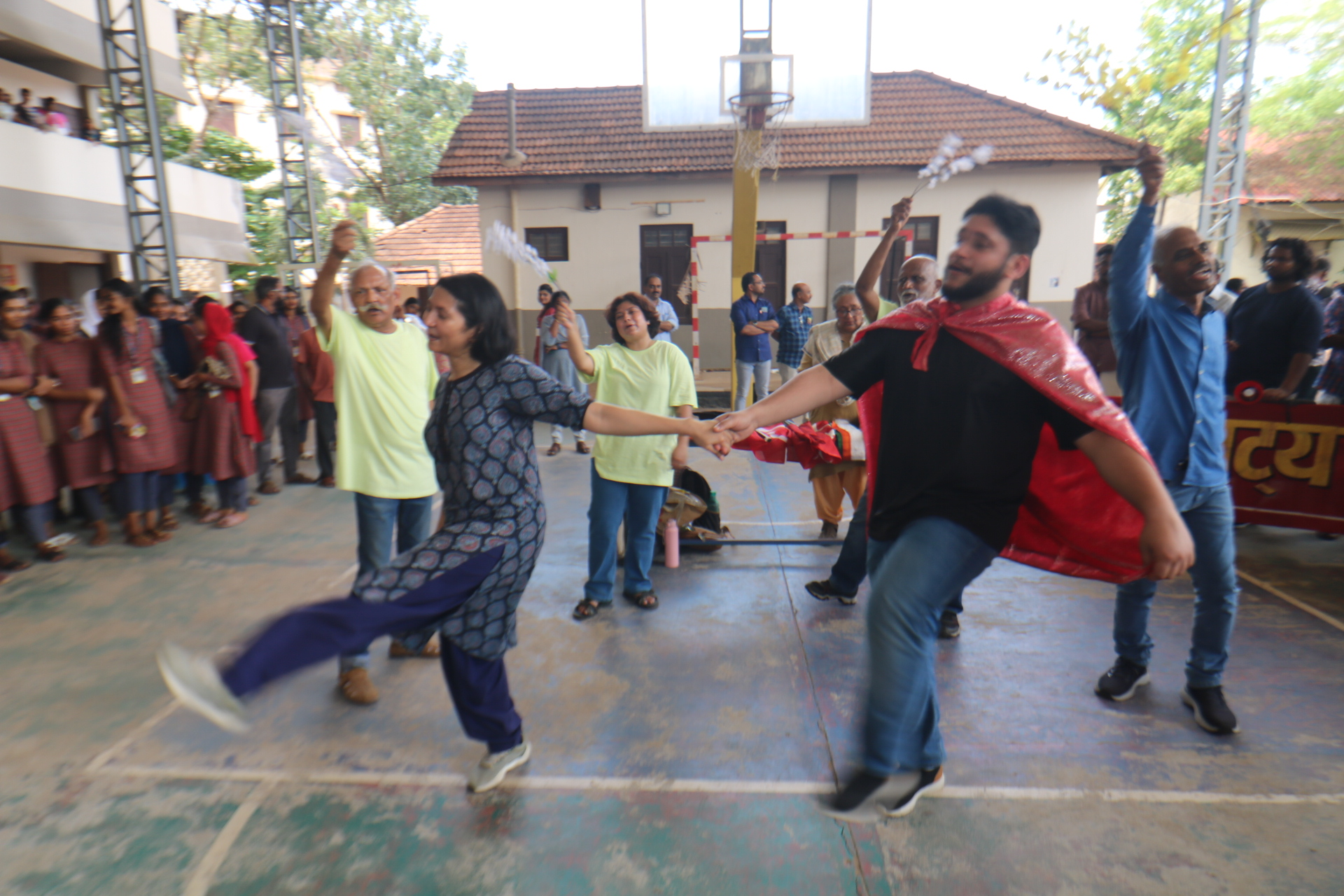
Jannatyamanch at CPIM State meet 2025 at Kollam

Among Janam's recent proscenium plays is Aazadi Ne Jab Dastak Di, based on Manini Chatterjee's book Do and Die. In January 2004, Janam created Bush ka Matlab Jhadi (Bush is a just a bush!), a multimedia presentation celebrating the anti-imperialist sentiment the world over. The play used giant masks, video projection, and live music to create a hilarious expose of the US-UK role in Iraq, their ambitions of world conquest, and the people's resistance to it. The play was the outcome of Janam's collaboration with many artists including Surajit Sarkar (video artist), Arunkumar (sculptor), Kriti Arora (artist), Kanishka Prasad (architect), and Ashish Ghosh (music director). This 45-minute play was commissioned by the World Social Forum in Mumbai.

Later in 2004 Janam produced a proscenium play Shambookvadh on the question of caste. This play is scripted by Brijesh, has music by Kajal Ghosh, and is directed by Sudhanva Deshpande. The play was invited to the National School of Drama's theatre festival in 2006, and to the Prithvi Festival in November 2006. In the summer of 2008, Janam produced Ulte Hor Zamaaney Aye, a proscenium play written by Brijesh, with music by Kajal Ghosh and directed by Sudhanva Deshpande. This was a black comedy about a woman who struggles to get treatment for her husband, who is initially mistaken for a bomb blast victim in a hospital, but dropped like a hot brick when they find out he is actually an industrial worker.

Among Janam's recent street plays, Yeh Dil Mange More Guruji is on the attempts of the Hindu Right brigade to destroy India's secular and democratic framework; Aakhri Juloos is on the right to protest; Yeh Bhi Hinsa Hai is a play against the growing violence on women; One Two ka Four is a reworked version of an earlier play, Nahi Qubool, on the nuclear deal; Yeh Hum Kyon Sahen is on the conditions of workers in and around Delhi.

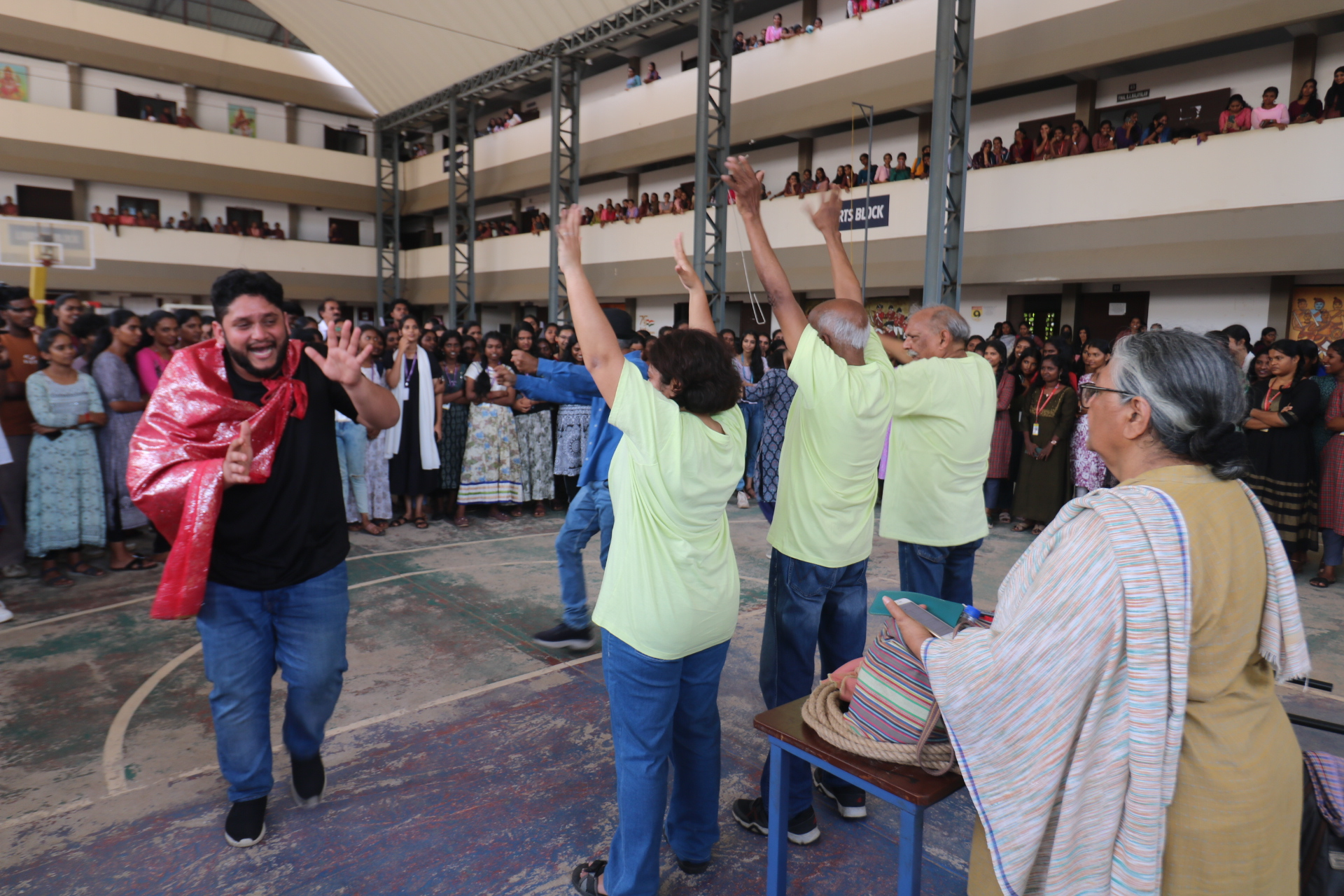
Jannatyamanch at CPIM State meet 2025 at Kollam

== Safar, the mobile theatre ==
In 1997 Janam constructed an innovative and dismantleable mobile theatre, Safar (acronym for Safdar Rangmanch), to take proscenium plays to working class areas. Safar is a flexible, innovative structure designed by Janak Mistry. It is set up by the actors of Janam wherever they go to perform their large proscenium plays, and is equipped with lights and a sound system. It can be used for a variety of purposes, and various kinds of spaces can be created in it. It can seat about 600-700 people.

== Studio Safdar, Shadipur ==
In 2012, Janam moved into its own space. Located about 6 km west of Connaught Place is a neighbourhood known as Shadi Khampur, where the group has created a small black box theatre, called Studio Safdar. Janam also has premises on the top floor of the same building, and uses the open terrace to do its own rehearsals. Studio Safdar is envisaged as a space that can be used by theatre and other artists to experiment in, create new work, and to show it. The larger idea of how the space came into being and the activities therein within the first year of its establishment are explained by Sudhanva Deshpande in interviews here and here (subscription required). Next door to Studio Safdar is the May Day Bookstore and Cafe, managed and run by LeftWord Books.

== In popular culture ==
The 1989 Hindi film, Salim Langde Pe Mat Ro, directed by Saeed Akhtar Mirza, was dedicated to the memory of Safdar Hashmi. The 2008 Hindi film, Halla Bol, directed by Rajkumar Santoshi, was inspired by his life of founder Safdar Hashmi, and also depicts a scene, where a street theatre activist is shown being beaten by political goons, but turns into a catalyst for public uprising in the film.

== Publications ==
- Theatre of the Streets: The Jana Natya Manch Experience, edited by Sudhanva Deshpande, Delhi: Janam, 2007.
- The Right to Perform: Selected Writings of Safdar Hashmi, Delhi: Sahmat, 1989.
- Deshpande, Sudhanva (26 April – 9 May 2008). "Voice of the Streets". Frontline. Vol. 25, no. 9.
- Vijay Prashad, 'Safdar Hashmi Amar Rahe'.
- Eugene van Erven, 'Plays, Applause and Bullets : Safdar Hashmi's Street Theatre'.
- Interview with Sudhanva Deshpande.
- Vincent, Pheroze L. (23 March 2013). "... for the People". The Hindu. Archived from the original on 31 August 2014.
