= Deshbandhu College =

Constituent college of University of Delhi

- Motto: "कर्मण्येवाधिकारस्ते"
- Type: Government
- Established: 1952; 72 years ago
- Accreditation: NAAC (A++ Grade)
- Affiliations: University of Delhi
- Principal: Prof. Rajendra Kumar Pandey
- Location: Kalkaji Main Rd, Block H, Kalkaji, Delhi, 110019, India; 28.5401439°N 77.254214°E
- Campus: Urban
- Website: www.deshbandhucollege.ac.in
- Location within Delhi Location within India

Deshbandhu College (Hindi: देशबंधु कॉलेज) is a college established in 1952 and affiliated to University of Delhi. Deshbandhu College was established in 1953 by the Ministry of Rehabilitation, as a memorial to freedom fighter Deshbandhu Gupta.

== Rankings ==
It is NAAC A++ college and ranked 13th among colleges in India by the National Institutional Ranking Framework (NIRF) in 2025.

== Student life ==
=== Societies ===
Following is the list of societies of Deshbandhu College (excluding Departmental societies) -

- MarkSoc:DBC - THE MARKETING SOCIETY OF DESHBANDHU COLLEGE
- Sharpshooters- The Photography Society
- Deshbandhu Dramatics Society - Stage players
- Oculis - Film society
- Deshbandhu Dramatics Society - Street theatre Society
- Dialecticians - English debating society
- Antdristi - Hindi debating society
- Art Meister - Art and craft society
- Physica - The Physics society
- Fiontrai - Entrepreneurship Cell
- Quizzards - Quizzing club
- YUVA - Youth United for Vision and Action
- Timbre - music society
- IGNIS - flashmob group
- National Cadet Corps
- National service scheme
- Enactus Deshbandhu
- Deshbandhu Express - College media channel owned and run by students
- DESH - college magazine
- Riwayat - The Classical Dance Society
- Leaders of tomorrow - NGO
- POLIENZ - The Political Science Society
- SPANDAN - Bengali literary and Cultural Society of Deshbandhu College

=== Events ===
Deshbandhu College organises its annual fest Sabrang in even semesters. Each department has their societies which organise seminars and lectures by eminent scholars and scientists.

== Notable people ==
=== Notable faculty ===
- Om Prakash Kohli, former member of Rajya Sabha, Governor of Gujarat
- Ravish Kumar, Ramon Magsaysay Awardee

=== Notable alumni ===
- Prabhu Chawla; Editorial Director of The New Indian Express
- Gulshan Kumar; Founder of the T-Series, Bollywood movie producer
- Late Rajiv Goswami; Activist, President of Delhi University Students Union
- Ajay Dutt; MLA, Delhi Legislative Assembly
- Ashok Lavasa; Former Election Commissioner of India
- Ravish Kumar; Journalist and former news anchor at NDTV
- Late Major Udai Singh; Shaurya Chakra, Sena Medal
- Shantanu Moitra; Music composer, National Film Award winner for music direction
- Raghu Ram, MTV's Roadies Producer
- Sahil Uppal, Actor

== See also ==
- Education in India
- Literacy in India
- List of institutions of higher education in Delhi
