= Safdar Hashmi =

Indian political playwright and director (1954–1989)

- Born: 12 April 1954; Delhi, India
- Died: 2 January 1989 (aged 34); Ghaziabad, Uttar Pradesh, India
- Occupations: Author, Street theatre, Activist
- Spouse: Moloyshree Hashmi
- Relatives: Sohail Hashmi (brother); Shabnam Hashmi (sister); Saba Azad (niece)
- Writing career
- Period: 1973–1989

Safdar Hashmi (12 April 1954 – 2 January 1989) was an Indian communist playwright and director, best known for his work with street theatre in India. He was also an actor, lyricist, and theorist, and he is still considered an important voice in Indian political theatre. He was an activist of the Students' Federation of India (SFI).

He was a founding member of Jana Natya Manch (People's Theatre Front; JANAM for short) in 1973, which grew out of the Indian People's Theatre Association (IPTA). He was murdered in 1989 in Jhandapur, while performing a street play, Halla Bol.

== Early life ==
Safdar Hashmi was born on 12 April 1954 in Delhi, to Haneef and Qamar Azad Hashmi. He spent the early part of his life in Delhi and Aligarh, where he grew up in a liberal environment, and went on to complete his schooling in Delhi. He was the brother of activists Shabnam Hashmi and Sohail Hashmi, and actress Saba Azad is his niece.

Hashmi graduated from St. Stephen's College, Delhi with a degree in English Literature, and went on to complete his M.A. in English from Delhi University. During this period, he became associated with the cultural unit of the Students' Federation of India, the student wing of the Communist Party of India (Marxist), and eventually with the Indian People's Theatre Association (IPTA). In the years before and after his graduation, he worked on several plays with IPTA, such as Kimlesh, and Dekhte Lena.

== Career and activism ==
The issue is not where the play is performed (and street theatre is only a mode of ensuring that art is available to the people), but the principal issue is the 'definite and unresolvable contradiction between the bourgeois individualist view of art and the people's collectivist view of art'.
- Safdar Hashmi, The Enchanted Arch, Or the Individual and Collective Views of Art (April 1983), The Right to Perform, pp. 28–29

Hashmi co-founded the Jana Natya Manch (People's Theatre Front), with the acronym JANAM ("birth" in Hindi), in 1973. JANAM grew out of the Indian People's Theatre Association (IPTA) and was associated with the Communist Party of India (Marxist), with which he was actively involved in the 1970s. When Indian Prime Minister Indira Gandhi was accused of rigging the elections, he produced a street play, Kursi, Kursi, Kursi (Chair, Chair, Chair), as a reaction to the controversy. The play narrates the story of a king whose throne moves with him when he attempts to give it up in favour of an elected representative. The play was performed every day for a week, at the Boat Club Lawns in New Delhi, then a hub of political activity. It proved to be a turning point for JANAM.

Until 1975, JANAM performed open-air proscenium and street plays for mass audiences. When Indira Gandhi imposed a state of emergency and made political theatre difficult, Hashmi began to work as a lecturer in English literature in universities in Garhwal, Kashmir, and Delhi.

When the Emergency ended in 1977, he returned to political activism, and in 1978, JANAM took to street theatre in a big way with Machine, which was performed for a trade union meeting of over 200,000 workers on 20 November 1978. This was followed by plays on the distress of small peasants (Gaon Se Shahar Tak), on clerical fascism (Hatyare & Apharan Bhaichare Ke), on unemployment (Teen Crore), on violence against women (Aurat) and on inflation (DTC ki Dhandhli). Hashmi also produced several documentaries and a TV serial for Doordarshan, including Khilti Kaliyan (Flowers in Bloom), which examined rural empowerment. He also wrote books for children and criticism of the Indian stage.

Hashmi was the de facto director of JANAM, and prior to his death, it gave about 4,000 performances of 24 street plays, mostly in working-class neighbourhoods, factories and workshops. Hashmi was a member of the Communist Party of India (Marxist), the largest communist party in India.

In 1979, he married his comrade and theatre actress, Moloyshree. Later, he worked for the Press Trust of India (PTI) and The Economic Times as a journalist, and then became Press Information Officer of the Government of West Bengal in Delhi. In 1984, he gave up his job and devoted himself full-time to political activism.

Hashmi’s output includes two proscenium plays – an adaptation of Maxim Gorky's Enemies (1983) and Moteram ka Satyagraha (with Habib Tanvir, 1988) – many songs, a television series script, poems and plays for children, and documentary films. While committed to radical, popular, and left-wing art, Hashmi refrained from clichéd portrayals, and was not afraid of formal experimentation.

== Murder ==
On 1 January 1989, the JANAM troupe began a performance of the street play Halla Bol (Raise Your Voice!), during the Ghaziabad municipal elections in Sahibabad's Jhandapur village (near Delhi). During the performance, the troupe was allegedly attacked by Indian National Congress workers. Hashmi was fatally injured following the scuffle and died the following day. On 4 January 1989, two days after his death, his wife Moloyshree Hashmi went to the same spot again with the JANAM troupe, and defiantly completed the play.

Fourteen years after the incident, a Ghaziabad local court convicted ten people, including Congress Party member Mukesh Sharma, for the murder.

== Legacy ==
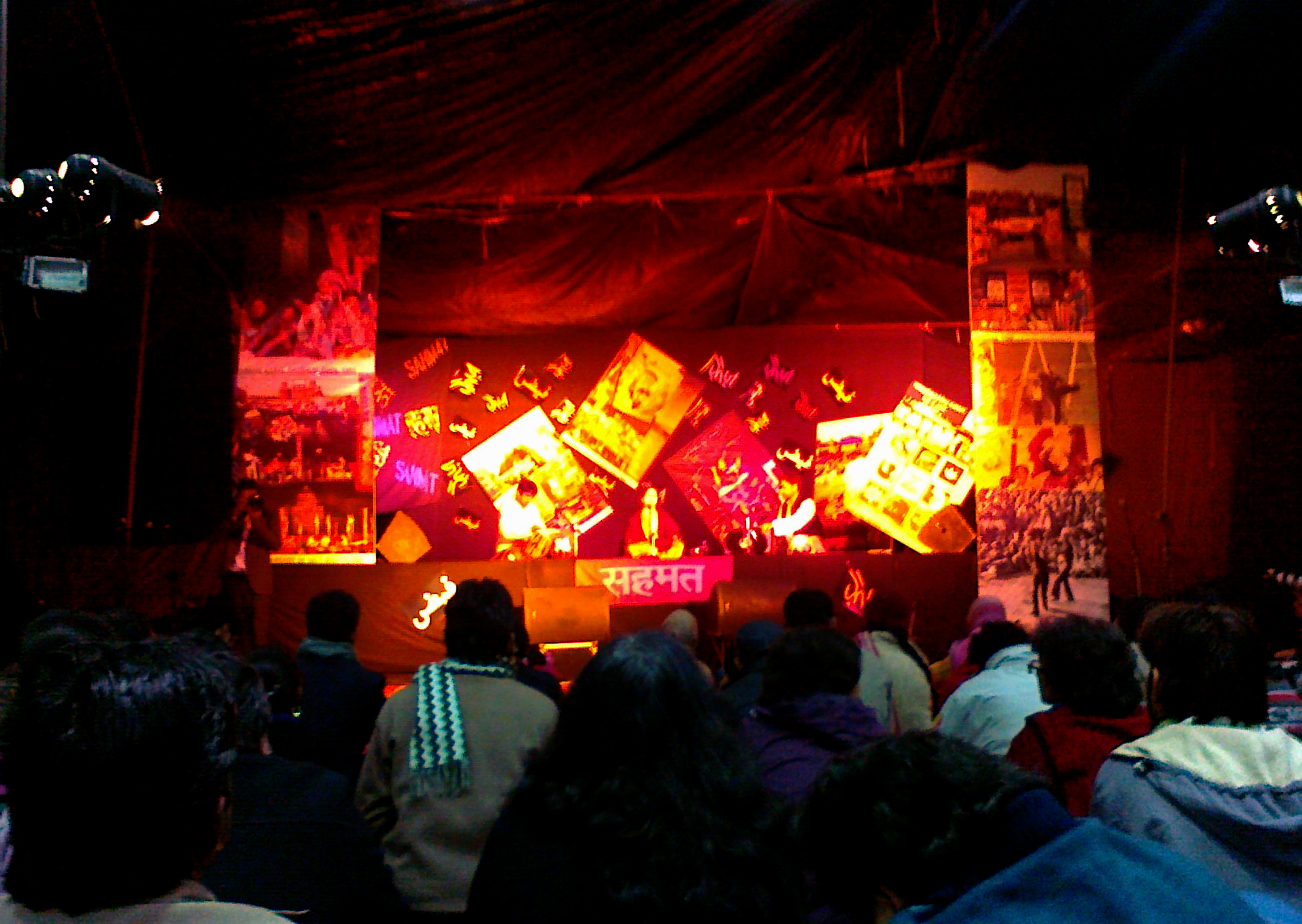
Classical Singer Vidya Shah is Performing for Sahmat. 1 January 2011, New-Delhi.

Hashmi has become a symbol of cultural resistance against authoritarianism for the Indian Left. JANAM continues its theatre work, and on 12 April 2012, Hashmi's birthday, the group inaugurated Studio Safdar, a performance and workshop space located in Shadi Khampur, near Patel Nagar in Central Delhi. The space is next door to a left-wing cafe and bookstore, May Day. The writer Bhisham Sahni, along with many other artists, founded the Safdar Hashmi Memorial Trust (SAHMAT) in February 1989, as an open platform for politically and socially conscious artists. Hashmi's writings were later collected in The Right to Perform: Selected Writings of Safdar Hashmi (New Delhi, 1989).

Each year on 1 January, the Safdar Hashmi Memorial Day is observed as a "Day of Resolve" by SAHMAT, and a daylong cultural congregation, "Jashn-e-Daura", is organised in New Delhi. The day is also commemorated by JANAM, which organises street plays at Jhandapur village, in Sahibabad, where he was killed.

In 1998, Safdar Hashmi Natyasangham was formed in Kozhikode, Kerala, which provides free training to economically backward students.

The 2003 film Anbe Sivam, made by Sundar C, and the 2008 film Halla Bol, made by Rajkumar Santoshi, were inspired by his life. The latter also depicts a scene where a street theatre activist is beaten by men hired by a political party, an incident which turns into a catalyst for a public uprising.

In 1989, the painter M. F. Husain had a painting "Tribute to Hashmi" sold at auction for over $1 million, the first time a painting by an Indian artist reached this valuation.

The 2020 book Halla Bol: The Death and Life of Safdar Hashmi by Sudhanva Deshpande recounts the events leading up to the attack on Jana Natya Manch's performance of the play Halla Bol in Jhandapur on 1 January 1989, in which Safdar sustained fatal injuries. It also discusses Safdar's work.

The Institute for Research and Documentation in Social Sciences (IRDS), a non-governmental organisation from Lucknow, has been awarding the Safdar Hashmi Award for Human Rights in reverence to his contributions to the cause of human rights. A street in Mandi House, New Delhi was named after Safdar Hashmi.
