= Jhandapur =

- village
- Interactive map of Jhandapur
- Country: India
- State: Uttar Pradesh
- District: Kaushambi

Government
  - Body: Gram panchayat

Languages
  - Official: Urdu, Hindi
- Time zone: UTC+5:30 (IST)
- Postal code: 212201

Jhandapur is a village located in the Sirathu Tehsil of Kaushambi District in Uttar Pradesh, India. It is strategically positioned between the main railway line of the Delhi-Howrah route and the Grand Trunk Road. Jhandapur is approximately 1 kilometer from the Shujatpur Railway Station, 10 kilometers from Manjhanpur (the district headquarters of Kaushambi District), around 50 kilometers from the city of Prayagraj(Allahabad), and about 600 kilometers from New Delhi.

== Geography and Location ==
- Block Name: Sirathu
- District: Kaushambi
- State: Uttar Pradesh
- Time Zone: IST (UTC+5:30)

== Demographics ==
According to the 2011 Census, Jhandapur has a total population of 1,560 people residing in 238 houses. The female population makes up 47.6% (743) of the total population. The overall literacy rate in the village is 54.4%, with male literacy being higher than female literacy, which stands at 21.4% (334). The Scheduled Caste population is 19.3% (301) of the total population, while there is no Scheduled Tribe population. The working population comprises 30.1% of the total population. The child population (ages 0-6) in 2011 was 291, with 43.0% (125) being girl children.

=== Census Details ===
Census Parameter	Census Data
Total Population	1,560
Total Number of Houses	238
Female Population %	47.6% (743)
Total Literacy Rate %	54.4% (849)
Female Literacy Rate %	21.4% (334)
Scheduled Tribes Population %	0.0% (0)
Scheduled Caste Population %	19.3% (301)
Working Population %	30.1%
Child (0-6) Population (2011)	291
Girl Child (0-6) Population %	43.0% (125)

The primary languages spoken in Jhandapur are Urdu and Hindi

== Economy ==
The main sources of income for the residents of Jhandapur are farming, business, and employment in Gulf countries. Agriculture plays a significant role in the local economy, supplemented by business ventures and remittances from those working abroad.

== Administration ==
- Current Pradhan: Mohd. Akhtar
- Assembly Constituency: Sirathu
- Assembly MLA: Dr. Pallavi Patel
- Lok Sabha Constituency: Kaushambi
- Parliament MP: Pushpendra Saroj (SP)

== Infrastructure ==
Jhandapur features several key infrastructures that support the local community:

- Ponds: There are four major ponds in Jhandapur, which serve as important water sources for both domestic use and agriculture.
- Masjids: The village is home to five mosques, serving as places of worship and community gathering for the local Muslim population.

== Education ==
Jhandapur and its surrounding areas have several educational institutions that cater to the local population:

=== Schools ===
- Primary School Jhandapur: Located in Jhandapur, Uttar Pradesh 212201, about 0.1 km from Jhandapur.
- BARKATI PUBLIC SCHOOL: Situated in Bamharavli, Uttar Pradesh, approximately 0.8 km from Jhandapur.
- m b o Convent School And College: Located at Tedhimode Sirathu Kaushambi, - Allahabad Highway, Bamharavli, Uttar Pradesh, about 0.8 km away.
- S S A INTERMEDIATE COLLEGE: Situated on Kanpur - Allahabad Highway, Andhawa, Uttar Pradesh, approximately 0.9 km from Jhandapur.
- H.H.A. INTERMEDIATE COLLEGE AND CONVENT: Located at Tedi Mod Andawan, Kaushambi, Uttar Pradesh, about 1.3 km away.

=== Colleges ===
- श्री रणजीत पंडित इंटर कॉलेज शहजादपुर (Shri Ranjeet Pandit Inter College Shahjahanpur): Located on Ranjeet Pandit Inter College Road, Andhawa, Uttar Pradesh, about 4.6 km from Jhandapur.
- DDM College of Nursing and Paramedical Science: Situated in Nauriha Amad Karari, Kaushambi, on NH-2 (G T Road) in Sirathu, approximately 7.5 km away.
- Madhupati Vachaspati Rajaram Arya Inter College: Located in Adarsh Kasiya, Nauriha Amad Karari, Kaushambi, on NH-2 (G T Road) in Sirathu, about 13 km from Jhandapur.

== Transportation ==
Jhandapur is well-connected by road and has several nearby bus stops that facilitate transportation to and from the village:

- SAINI Bus Stand: Located in Saini, Uttar Pradesh, approximately 10.2 km from Jhandapur.
- UPRS Parivahan Nigam Bus Station Saini: Located in Saini, Kaushambi, on NH-2 (G T Road) in Sirathu, about 10.4 km away.
  - Mooratganj Bus Stop: Located on NH2 in Muratganj, Uttar Pradesh, approximately 18.2 km from Jhandapur.
