= Hojang Taret =

Classical Meitei language Greek tragedy

- Original title: Ancient Greek: Φοίνισσαι, romanized: Phoinissai, lit. 'The Phoenician Women'
- Original language: Meitei language (Manipuri language) (Note: It is the original language of the version of a literary adaptation.)
- Written by: Euripides (Note: He's the original author.)
- Based on: Ancient Greek: Φοίνισσαι, romanized: Phoinissai, lit. 'The Phoenician Women'
- Chorus: Phoenician women
- Characters: Jocasta; Eteocles; Polyneices
- Genre: Greek tragedy
- Setting: Before the royal palace of Ancient Thebes (Boeotia)

Premiere
- Date: 16 April 2018
- Place: Imphal, Manipur

Hojang Taret is a classical Meitei language play based on Euripides's ancient Greek tragedy The Phoenician Women. It is directed by Oasis Sougaijam and produced by The Umbilical Theatre in Imphal, Kangleipak (Meitei for 'Manipur'). It depicts the moral ambiguities of conflict between brothers resulting to the ruination of the ancient city of Thebes.

== Plot ==
Before mother Jocasta takes her own life, she has attempted to bring concord between her two sons, Eteocles and Polyneices. The two brothers are having a strong conflict to achieve the throne. Her sons do not listen to any of her words. All her efforts to avoid the occurrence of a tragic loss of the precious lives of her beloved children are futile. Thus, both the princes ended up their lives killing each other. Queen Jocasta's grief knows no bound. Finally, she commits suicide. Immediately afterwards, the city of Thebes witnesses its destruction.

== Overview ==
While the play Hojang Taret was performed in the 13th edition of the Mahindra Excellence Theatre Awards (META), Oasis Sougaijam, the director of Hojang Taret, noted:

“Focus is to blend the physical movement, visual imagery and music into a visual narrative. ... Hojang Taret is a classical Greek tragedy, written by Euripides, relevant even today. The long struggle for our Independence and the division of our country resonated with me. These similarities of the aftermath of war, pertinent even after 2,500 years, induced me to pick this play for a larger audience. The focus of my direction is to blend the physical movement, visual imagery and music into a visual narrative with multimedia element.”

— Oasis Sougaijam, Director, Hojang Taret

Besides the META, the play was presented in the 19th Bharat Rang Mahotsav organized by the Ministry of Culture (India), following a selection process and a screening process for the event.

On 8 March 2018, the play was also performed in the 8th Theatre Olympics 2018, in Bhanja Kala Mandap, BJB Nagar, Bhubaneswar, Odisha.

== See also ==
- Bacchae (Thiyam play)
- Lairembigee Eshei
- The Phoenician Women
- Yamata Amasung Keibu Keioiba
