= Bharat Rang Mahotsav =

Annual theatre festival in India

- Ratan Thiyam and Om Puri at the inauguration of Bharat Rang Mahotsav, 2015
- Genre: Theatre
- Dates: Third week of January
- Location: New Delhi
- Years active: 1999 – present
- Founded: 1999
- Patron: National School of Drama
- Website: Official website

Bharat Rang Mahotsav (BRM) (भारत रंग महोत्सव) or the National Theatre Festival, started in 1999, is the annual theatre festival organised by National School of Drama (NSD), New Delhi. The festival was started to showcase works of Indian theatre practitioners, and it has grown over the years to attract international performers as well. Originally the festival was national in scope, but has gradually become an international one. The 2009 Festival featured 63 productions, out of which 51 were from India and 12 were overseas plays, over a span of 12 days. Today it is acknowledged as the largest theatre festival of Asia, dedicated solely to theatre 15th Bharat Rang Mahotsav The festival is generally held during the second week of January each year at venues in and around NSD campus, and also in a one "showcase city", where a "Satellite Festival" of Bharat Rang Mahotsav is held. For example, in 2009, the venue Lucknow saw 18 productions. In 2010 the venue was Bhopal.

Lairembigee Eshei (Song of the Nymphs), a Meitei language play, directed by Ratan Thiyam, was staged as the closing ceremony on the concluding day of the 21st event of the BRM in Delhi.

== History ==
=== 1999-2009 ===
1st BRM: The first ever all-Indian theatre festival, Bharat Rang Mahotsav 1999, opened on 18 March in New Delhi, with staging of Girish Karnad's play Nagamandala (Hindi) directed by Amal Allana. Held during the tenure Ram Gopal Bajaj as NSD Director, the festival also featured Calcutta-based Nandikar group's solo act Meghnad Badh Kavya (Bengali) written by Michael Madhusudan Dutta, Girish Karnad's Agni aur Barkha (Hindi) directed by Prasanna, Ajneya's Uttar Priyadarshi (Manipuri) directed by Ratan Thiyam and Himmat Mai (Hindi), an adaptation of Brecht's Mother Courage, and plays in several Indian languages, including Tamil, Malayalam, Assamese, Telugu, Kannada, Marathi, Punjabi, Dogri and Bhojpuri. A silent performance of Shakespeare's Othello, with only a few "sounds" in Arabic, directed by Teofik Jebali from Tunisia was only foreign entry.

4th BRM: The 4th Bharat Rang Mahotsav, was inaugurated by Pandit Ravi Shankar on 16 March 2002, and featured 126 dramas in more than 20 languages, and plays from five other countries, including Korea, Bangladesh, Germany, Israel and Mauritius. The focus of the festival was on theatre from West Bengal and the North East, showcased in four productions from Manipur, including Bhoot Amusung (Devil and the Mask) directed by L Dorendra, five from Assam with 'Hamlet' by Dulal Roy and nine plays from West Bengal. Nagaland, showcased its dances, and Nidhali with young dancers under NSD graduate Rabijita Gogoi, as part of an NSD extension programme, finally Mizoram presented Zanriah El Hmain by Siddharth Chakraborty. The plays were staged at eight venues in and around NSD, and the festival concluded on 8 April, with Ratan Thiyam's presentation of Kalidasa's epic poem Ritusamharam.

7th BRM: Seventh Bharat Rang Mahotsav held in January 2005, in New Delhi, was marked by veteran theatre director, Mohan Maharishi's breakthrough Hindi play, "Ho Rahega Kuch Na Kuch" inspired by Marsha Norman's 1983 English play, "'Night, Mother".

8th BRM: Eighth Bharat Rang Mahotsav (2006) showcased 60 plays from all over India, and also from Asia and the Arab world. A three-day international seminar titled "Theatre in Turmoil" was inaugurated by Richard Schechner, a theatre scholar and director, participated by theatre directors, scholars, critics and designers from China, Japan, Lebanon, Iraq, Iran, Pakistan, Bangladesh, Nepal, Sri Lanka, South Korea and India.

9th BRM: Ninth Bharat Rang Mahotsav opened at Siri Fort Auditorium on 6 January 2007 with a performance by Sasha Waltz, the dancer-cum-choreographer from Germany, and featured the 52 performances, 13 from Australia, Bangladesh, China, Pakistan, Germany, Iran, Japan, South Korea, Nepal, Poland, Sri Lanka, Switzerland and Uzbekistan, and 39 Indian productions including tribute production, theatre director Alyque Padamsee's play "Macbeth", and choreographer Narendra Sharma's "Mukhantar and Conference". The International dance theatre showcased works of Leszek Bzdyl, Beatrice Jaccard and Peter Schelling, also Indian dancers and choreographers like Maya Krishna Rao, Padmini Chettur, Geeta Chandran and Veenapani Chawla. The "Satellite Festival" was held at Kolkata, from 12 and 20 January.

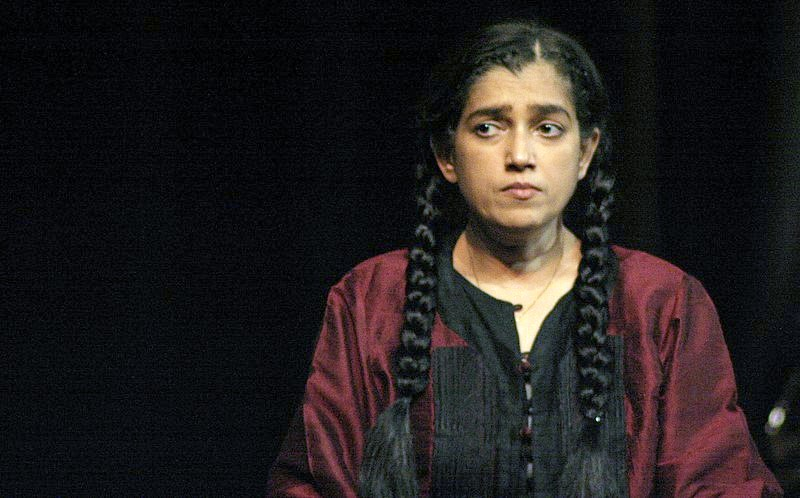
Ratna Pathak during performance at 2008 festival

10th BRM: In 2008, when NSD celebrated its golden jubilee the festival also saw a gathering of its alumni from all over the country, and from Bangladesh, Nepal and Mauritius. The festival was on 3 January inaugurated by Delhi Chief Minister, Sheila Dikshit in the presence of theatre personality, Ebrahim Alkazi at Kamani Auditorium, New Delhi. The opening performance was "Prologue", the first part of Ratan Thiyam's "Manipur Trilogy" and in all the festival featured 76 productions, 57 from India and 19 from abroad stretched over 17 days. 26 productions also travelled to Mumbai for the "Satellite Festival" organised, from 6 to 17 January, as it showcased plays of NSD graduates, including Ratan Thiyam's Prologue, Bansi Kaul (Aranyadhipati Tantiya), Neelam Mansingh Chowdhury (The Suit), Sanjay Upadhyay (Harsingar), Baharul Islam (Akash), Mohan Maharishi (Dear Bapu)) and M K Raina (Stay Yet Awhile).

11th BRM: The 11th Bharat Rang Mahotsav, was inaugurated by Jawhar Sircar, Union Secretary for Culture, on 7 January 2009 at Kamani Auditorium, with theatre personality Zohra Sehgal, as the guest of honour, and opened with the performance of the Marathi play "Awagha Rang Ekachi Zaala". The festival focused on the productions by young directors, thus the included plays are collaborative works, based on texts, adaptations and also plays developed through training and workshops, in all it featured 65 plays, 51 from India and 13 international productions, played across 7 venues.

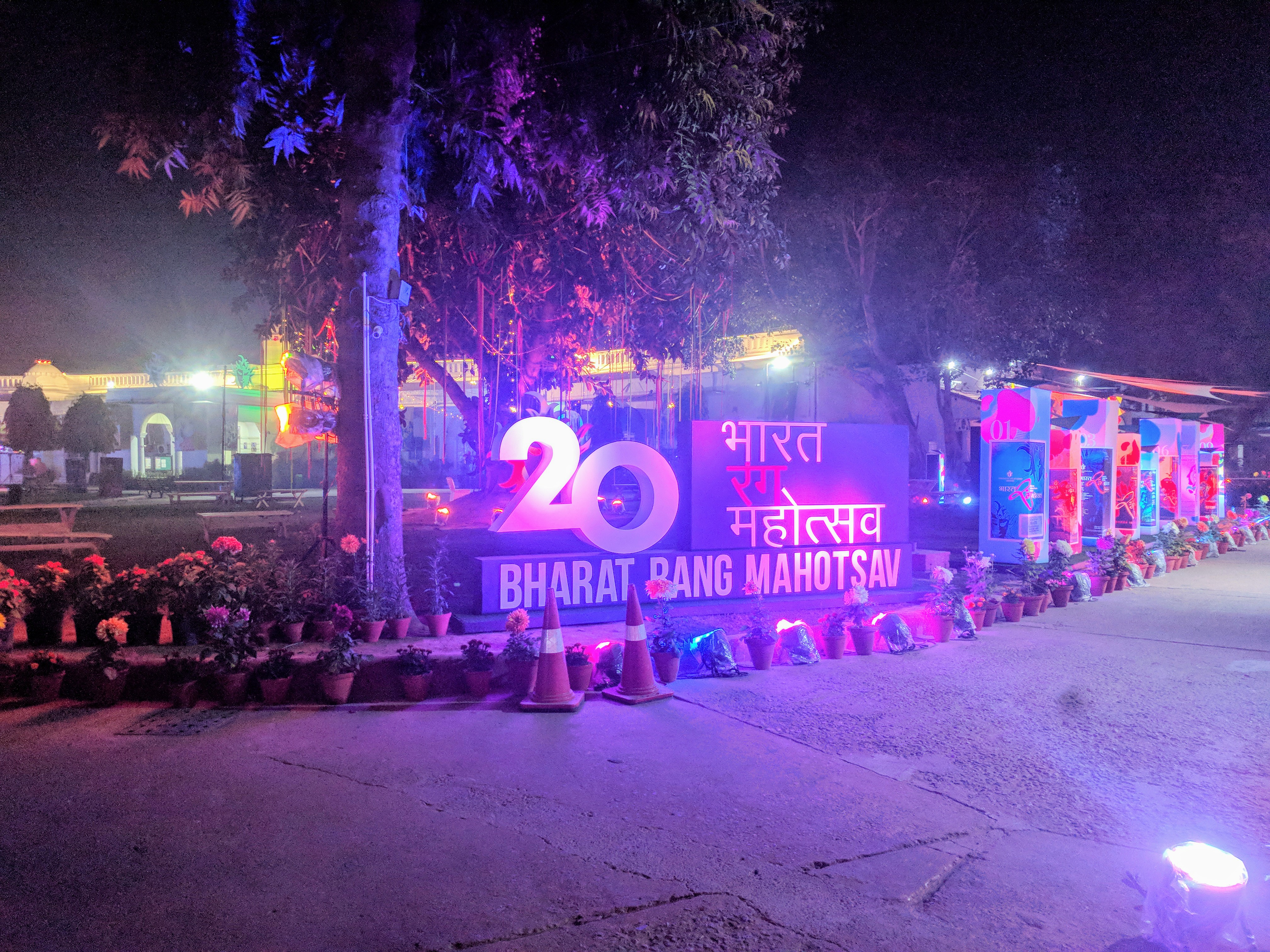
20 Rang Mahotsav in 2019

=== 2010 - present ===
12th BRM: The 2010 Festival, featured close to 90 plays, including 13 international productions, and productions by theatre veterans, Ratan Thiyam's "When we Dead Awaken" and S. Ramanujam's "Veriattam". The festival highlighted the role of music in theatre, through a segment titled Natya Naad, featuring trademark songs of various parts of India and of various theatre personalities, and performances based on the music in the works of B.V. Karanth, Bhaskar Chandavarkar, K. N. Panikkar and IPTA music. It also included Parwaz, a puppet theatre group from Kabul, Afghanistan with 'The Wolf and the Goat' and 'The Hedgehog and the Rabbit', a troupe from Pakistan presenting the Urdu version of Kalidas's epic Sanskrit play Shakuntala, plus from Israel, a clown show titled 'Odysseus Chaoticus'. In 2010, the "showcase city" was Bhopal, the capital of Madhya Pradesh, where a nine-day theatre festival part of the Bharat Rang Mahotsav was inaugurated by the Madhya Pradesh Chief Minister, Shivraj Singh Chouhan, showcasing 15 plays national and international plays in Bengali, Malayalam, Manipuri and Kannada as well as English, French and Nepali languages hosted at Ravindra Bhawan and Bharat Bhawan in Bhopal. With highlight being 'Umrao Jaan', 'Quick Death' and Ibsen's 'A Doll's House' in Nepali, and "The Doorway," performed by Jyoti Dogra, who also performed the play in Delhi Festival as well. Apart from the plays, the festival also hosted a tribute exhibition dedicated to life, works and theatre of B.V. Karanth and Habib Tanvir.

13th BRM: The 2011 festival, showcased 82 plays from across the world, three photographic exhibitions, an Asia-Pacific theatre showcase and new media theatre, from 7 to 22 January. The festival opened with an Assamese adaptation of Habib Tanvir's Charandas Chor directed by Anup Hazarika, a NSD graduate, and a special section on theatre personality Shyamanand Jalan, other plays were Girish Karnad's Bikhre Bimb, Dharamveer Bharti's Suraj ka Satwaan Ghoda and Henrik Ibsen's Lady of the Sea (Sagar Kanya), Alexander Pushkin's Little Big Tragedies and Rabindranath Tagore's Visarjan. 22 foreign productions from 20 countries were also part of the festival, this included Beaumarchais' opera The Barber of Seville, In Viva, a dance piece, a mime performance Silent Words, by Laurent Decol. From Latin America the festival featured Santa Maria de Iquique: Revenge of Ramon, a puppet performance from Pueta Peralta (Chile), En un Sol Amarillo (Bolivia) and Muare (Argentina). Apart from this two live (interactive) video theatre projects were new features in the festival, "The Garbage Project", about garbage problem in cities and "Social Gaming" on the impact of internet on human lives. The Contemporary dance theatre, section of festival had productions by Nora Amin from Egypt, Wendy Jehlen from the US and Min Tanaka and Aki Takahashi from Japan.

The festival was spread across eight venues in the Delhi, also travelled to Chennai 11–19 January.

14th BRM: The 2012 festival also marked the 150th birth anniversary of poet Rabindranath Tagore, thus the festival opened with the performance of Tagore's, The King of Dark Chamber or Raja directed by Ratan Thiyam of Chorus Repertory Theatre from Manipur. This was followed by 14 productions of his works, in all 96 productions including 16 foreign plays, performed across 11 venues in Delhi from 8–22 January 2012. The parallel festival city for the year was Amritsar, Punjab.

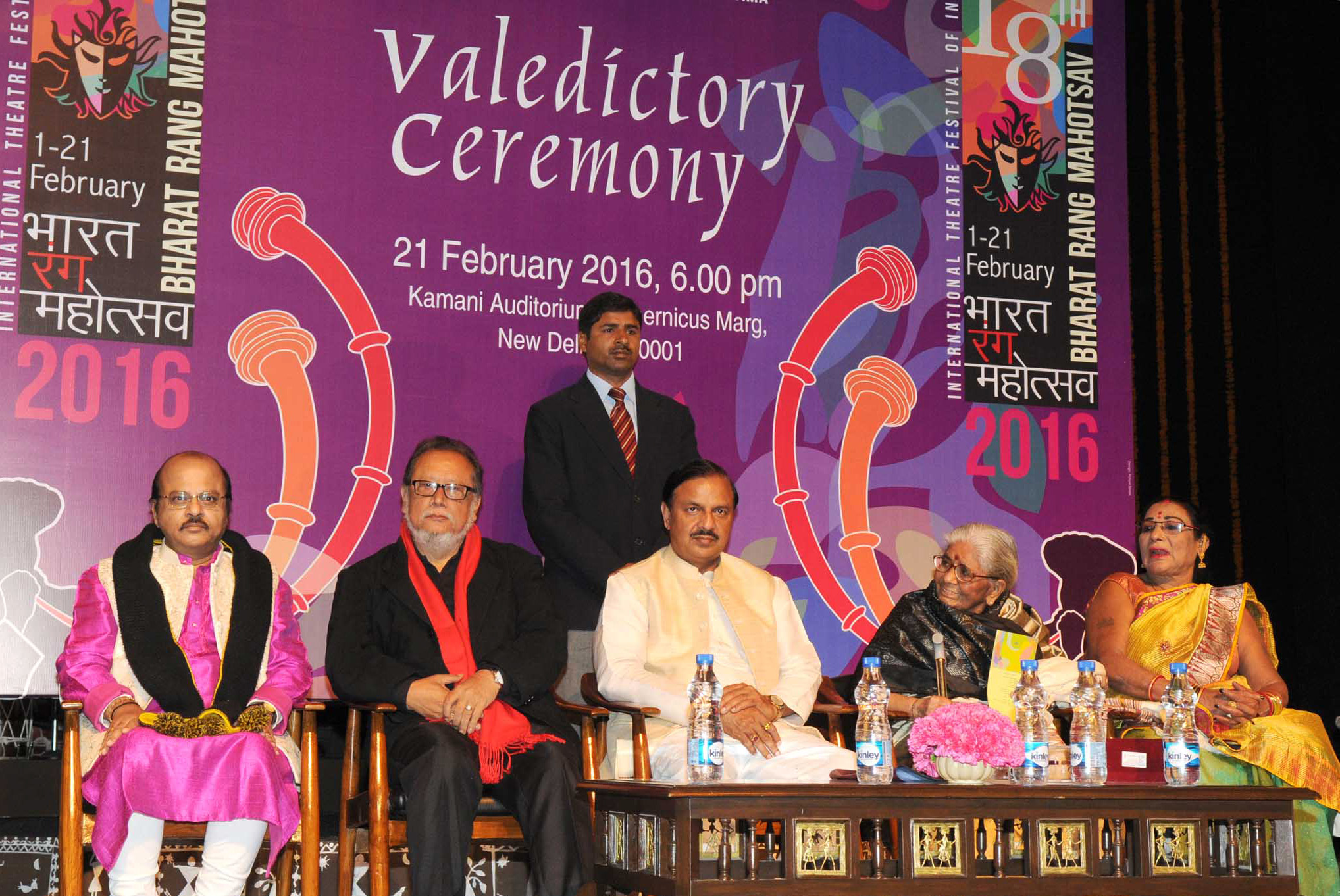
Ratan Thiyam at the “Valedictory Ceremony of Bharat Rang Mahotsav” at Kamani Auditorium, 2016

18th BRM: the 2016 Festival was held in 4 satellite cities apart from Delhi - Jammu, Bhubaneshwar, Trivandrum and Ahmedabad.

=== Silver Jubilee Celebration ===
NSD concluded its BRM@25, Silver Jubilee edition in February 2025. The festival was celebrated in India, Sri Lanka and Nepal, with over 500 performances by recognised industry stalwarts, global theatre practitioners and students of the drama school. Bollywood actor and NSD alumni Rajpal Yadav was nominated as the Rang Doot for BRM@25. There were masterclasses, seminars and talks with notable alumni of the school and industry professionals. Students of the Short Term courses also performed at the festival, with 10 - 30 minutes performances directed by faculty and alumni of the institute.

== Venue ==
Most of the plays during three weeks of the festival, are held at various theatre spaces within the NSD campus, including, Sanmukh, Abhimanch, Bahumukh and Meghdoot Open Air theatre at neighbouring Ravindra Kala Bhawan. Some plays are also held in city's large auditoriums like Kamani Auditorium, Shri Ram Centre and LTG auditorium.
