= Kamani Auditorium =

Performing arts venue in New Delhi, India

- Address: 1, Copernicus Marg
- Location: Mandi House, New Delhi, India
- Owner: Bharatiya Kala Kendra Trust
- Operator: Bharatiya Kala Kendra Trust
- Capacity: 632
- Type: Performing arts venue

Construction
- Opened: 1971

Website
- kamaniauditorium.org

Kamani Auditorium is a performing arts venue in the Mandi House cultural district of New Delhi, India. Opened in 1971, it is owned and operated by the Bharatiya Kala Kendra Trust and forms part of the Shriram Bharatiya Kala Kendra complex. Besides the main proscenium theatre, it also houses a smaller Jhankar Hall and an open-air arena. It is used for theatre, Indian classical dance and music, as well as national and international cultural productions, and has over the decades developed into a cultural landmark of Delhi.

== History ==
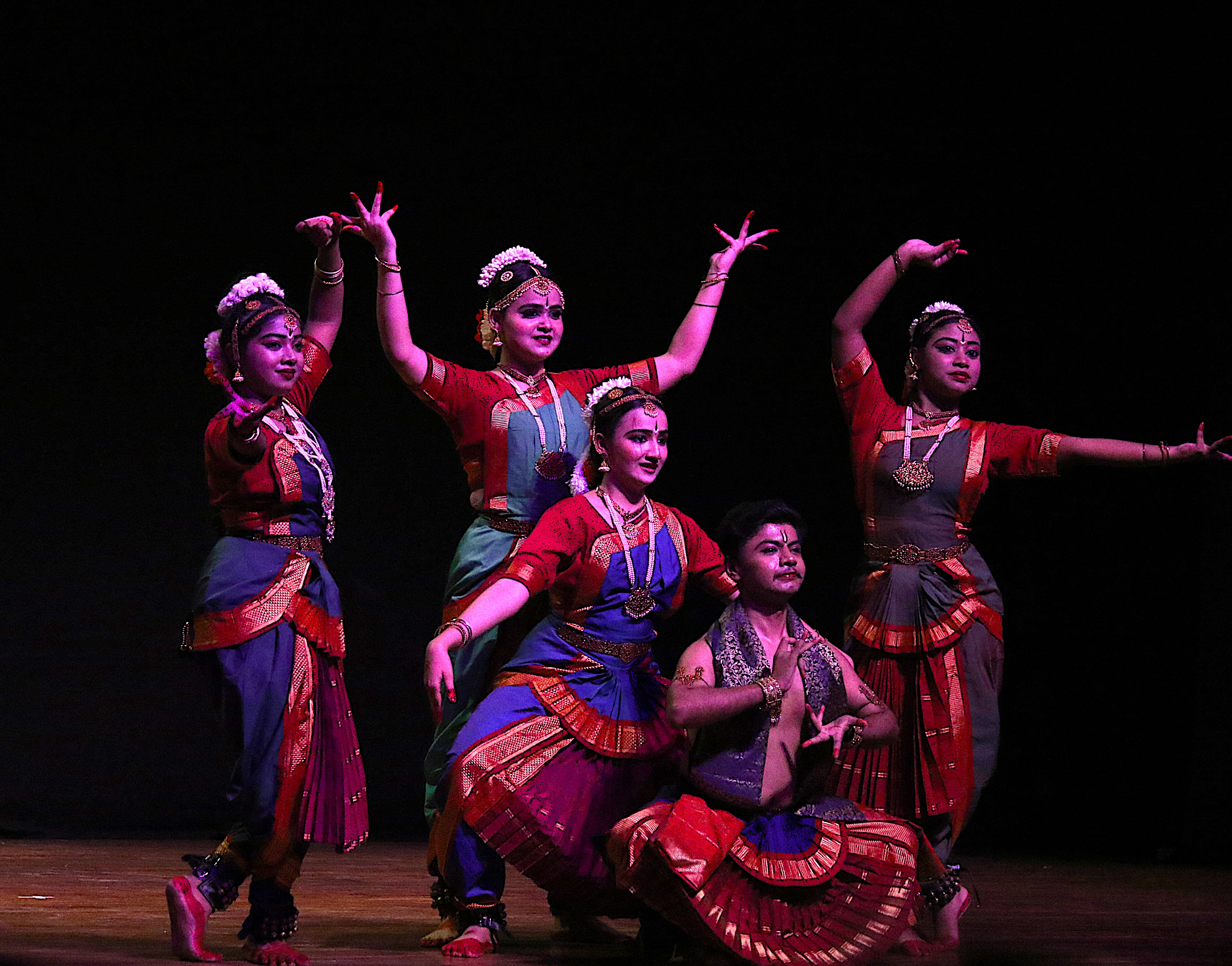
A Bharatanatyam dance at Kamani Auditorium

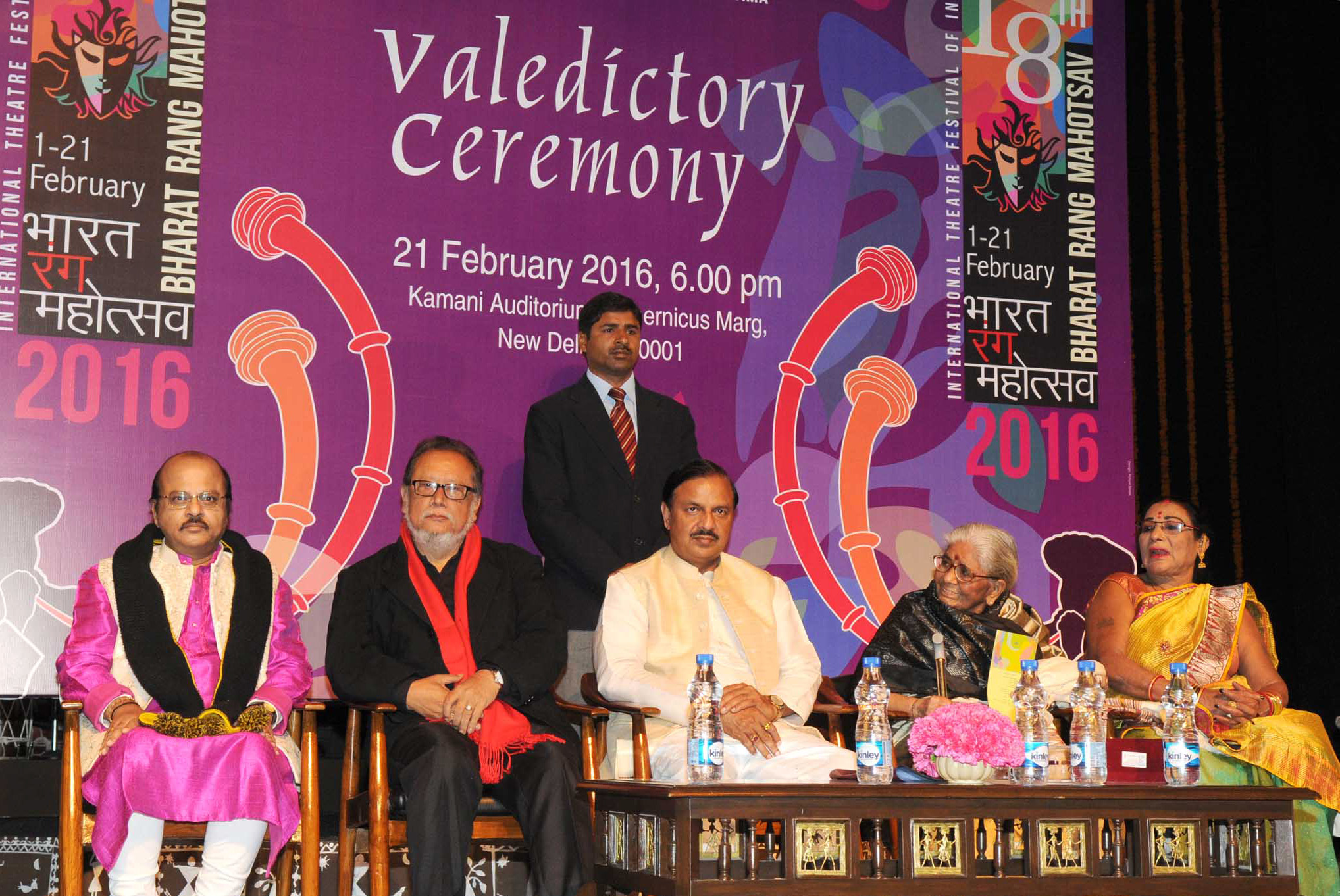
“Valedictory Ceremony of Bharat Rang Mahotsav” with Ratan Thiyam, organised by the National School of Drama, 2016

The auditorium developed as part of the expansion plan of the adjacent Shriram Bharatiya Kala Kendra, which had been founded by Sumitra Charat Ram in 1952. The stage lighting was designed by noted lighting designer Tapas Sen. The auditorium was inaugurated in August 1971 by the then President of India, V. V. Giri., with the inaugural presentation of Gita Govinda in Odissi dance stle was choreographed by Mayadhar Raut, who then headed the Odissi department at Shriram Bharatiya Kala Kendra.

The auditorium quickly became an important venue for classical music and dance in Delhi. When the first ITC Sangeet Sammelan held at Vigyan Bhavan in 1971, Ustad Bismillah Khan, objected to the lack of intimacy in the seating arrangement, as a result the annual festival was shifted to Kamani Auditorium in the following year. A landmark production of Habib Tanvir's Charandas Chor by Naya Theatre took place at Kamani in 1975.

Over the years, it has been venue for performances by Birju Maharaj, Zakir Hussain, Raja and Radha Reddy, Kelucharan Mohapatra, Chandralekha, Daksha Sheth, Maya Krishna Rao (1994) also productions by Sonal Mansingh.

== Cultural significance ==
Kamani Auditorium is one of the principal performance venues of Delhi's Mandi House cultural district, besides Little Theatre Group Auditorium and Shri Ram Centre, which also includes several major cultural institutions, including the National School of Drama, Sangeet Natak Akademi, Lalit Kala Akademi and Triveni Kala Sangam.

It has been a regular venue for major theatre festivals and cultural programmes in Delhi. The National School of Drama has repeatedly used the auditorium for its annual Bharat Rang Mahotsav, with inaugural and closing ceremonies of the festival along with many festival performances. In 2020, Ratan Thiyam's Lairembigee Eshei (The Song of the Nymphs) was performed closing production of the 21st Bharat Rang Mahotsav.It has additionally been used for the "Mahindra Excellence in Theatre Awards" and associated performances.

The auditorium has also hosted international theatre and performances of Indian classical music and dance. Over the decades, it has hosted cultural-exchange perforamances oragnized by the Indian Council for Cultural Relations (ICCR) with countries including Mauritius, South Africa, Slovakia, Kyrgyzstan, Tunisia, Bulgaria, China, Italy and Egypt. In 2011, productions of Dara and Bullha by Lahore-based Ajoka Theatre were staged at Kamani Auditorium as part of an India–Pakistan cultural programme. The The auditorium continues to be used for major classical dance and music programmes, theatre productions and cultural festivals organised by Shriram Bharatiya Kala Kendra and other institutions.

== Transport ==
The nearest Delhi Metro station is Mandi House, served by the Blue Line and Violet Line.

== See also ==
- Shriram Bharatiya Kala Kendra
- Shri Ram Centre for Performing Arts
- National School of Drama
- Mandi House
