= Bacchae (Thiyam play) =

Classical Meitei language Greek tragedy

The Bacchae
- Original title: Ancient Greek: Βάκχαι, romanized: Bakkhai, lit. 'The Bacchae'
- Original language: Meitei language (Manipuri language) (Note: It is the original language of the version of a literary adaptation.)
- Written by: Euripides
- Based on: Ancient Greek: Βάκχαι, romanized: Bakkhai, lit. 'The Bacchae'
- Chorus: Bacchae, female followers of Dionysus
- Characters: Pentheus; Dionysus
- Subject: Greek mythology
- Genre: Greek tragedy

Premiere
- Date: August, 2015
- Place: New Delhi and again in Imphal, Manipur

The Bacchae, also simply known as Bacchae, is a classical Meitei language play, based on an ancient Greek tragedy of the same name, written by Euripides (480-406 B.C.), one of the three tragedians of classical Athens. Directed by Thawai Thiyam, son of Ratan Thiyam, it is based on the story of king Pentheus of Thebes and Olympian god Dionysus.

== Overview ==
The play "Bacchae" was showcased in the "Poorvottar Rashtriya Rang Utsav", a 5-day festival of dramas from the North East Indian states, organised by the National School of Drama (NSD) of the Ministry of Culture (India) in August, 2015.

The play was performed by the Chorus Repertory Theatre, in the Asian Theatre Festival 2015, organised by Ningthoujam Tombi Theatre Manipur (NT Theatre), in Maharaja Chandrakirti Auditorium, Imphal, on 26 November 2015. The festival of dramas was organised during the Sangai Festival as a part of it.

== Plot ==
In the play, it shows the legend of king Pentheus of Thebes and the Olympian god Dionysus. God Dionysus is portrayed as a developed country. It results in globalization on a massive scale. On the other hand, king Pentheus is portrayed as a small community. Its chances of survival are unpredictable and always doubtful.

== See also ==
- Hojang Taret
- Lairembigee Eshei
- Yamata Amasung Keibu Keioiba
