= Hrishikesh Pawar =

Indian Kathak Dancer

- Born: 1983 (age 42–43); Pune, Maharashtra, India
- Occupations: Dancer, choreographer, dance educator
- Known for: Dance for Parkinson's programmes in India; Kathak-contemporary choreography
- Website: hrishikeshpawar.com

Hrishikesh Vithal Pawar (born 1983) is an Indian Kathak and contemporary dancer, choreographer and dance educator based in Pune. He is the founder and artistic director of the Centre of Contemporary Dance, Pune, and of the Prayatna Film and Dance Festival. His practice combines Kathak and contemporary dance and includes long-term community work with people living with Parkinson's disease, through free classes run by his Avartan Dance Foundation that were among the first programmes of their kind in India. In 2024 he was a Berlin Fellow in the performing arts at the Akademie der Künste, Berlin, and for the 2024–25 cycle he received the Bowen Award of the Mark Morris Dance Group's Dance for PD programme.

== Early life and training ==
Pawar was born in Pune in 1983 and grew up in a Marathi family in which dance was not regarded as a profession; he came to dance through school competitions and theatre before training in Kathak. He studied Kathak under Manisha Abhay and later under Rohini Bhate and Sharadhini Gole, and continued his Kathak training under Neelima Adhye.

In 2004 Pawar took part in a summer improvisation workshop in Berlin and performed as a soloist at German venues including the Seebühne on the island of Hiddensee. In 2005 he was invited to the Palucca School of Dance in Dresden as a guest student in its dance-teacher training programme, reportedly as the first Indian invited to the programme, and in 2006 he taught a Kathak course there. He returned to India in 2007 after a period of teaching and performing in Dresden.

== Career ==
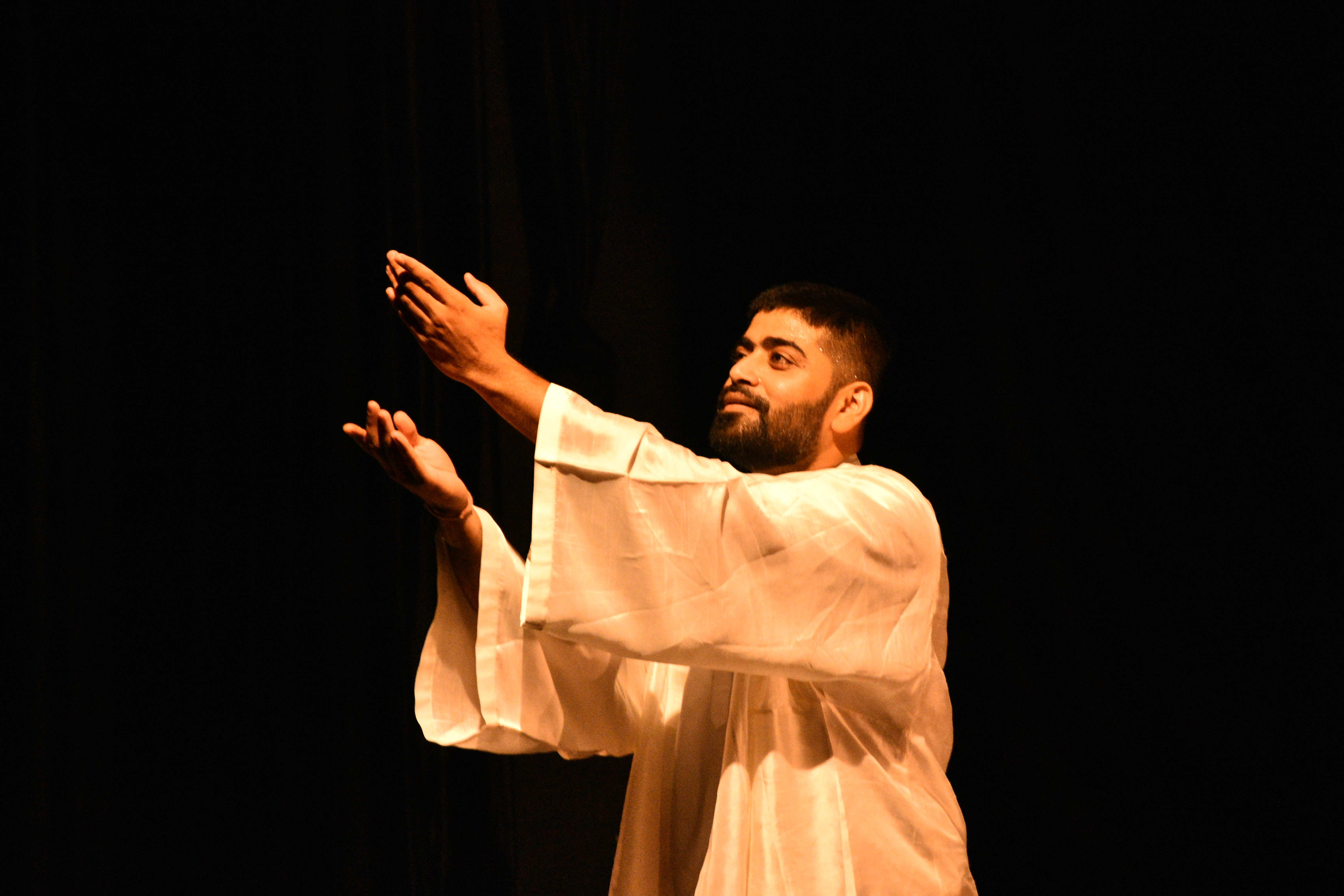
Pawar performing a solo work, 2022

In 2007 Pawar founded the Centre of Contemporary Dance in Pune, where his choreographic work combines Kathak with contemporary dance practice. In 2009 he established the Hrishikesh Dance Company in collaboration with the Max Mueller Bhavan. The same year he founded the Prayatna Film and Dance Festival, an annual festival of dance and dance film in Pune whose editions have been organized in association with the Max Mueller Bhavan; its sixteenth edition was held in April 2025.

In 2014 Pawar collaborated with the Chicago company Clinard Dance Theater, led by Wendy Clinard, setting a work on the company as part of an India–Chicago exchange supported by a grant to Clinard Dance from the John D. and Catherine T. MacArthur Foundation's International Connections Fund; Clinard travelled to Pune in 2015 as part of the same exchange.

In December 2023 Pawar curated and performed as lead dancer in In C in Pune, a staging of the Sasha Waltz & Guests work In C presented with the Goethe-Institut / Max Mueller Bhavan Pune at The Box, Pune; the cast combined professional dancers of his company with schoolchildren and members of his Dance for Parkinson's group.

Dancers of Pawar's company collaborated on the artist Tejal Shah's Landfill Dance, a channel of her five-channel video installation Between the Waves, which premiered at dOCUMENTA (13) in Kassel in 2012. In 2018–19 Pawar performed in Thought is also a Matter, a collateral exhibition of the Kochi-Muziris Biennale curated by Raju Sutar in Fort Kochi. His collaborative work has also been presented at the Fringe Festival in Canada. He has served as visiting faculty at the National Institute of Design in Ahmedabad, where his workshops have included Body & Space, and has lectured at the Inter-University Centre for Dance (HZT) in Berlin. He has also taught at the Film and Television Institute of India.

Pawar has choreographed for theatre, including the puppet-theatre production Rumiyana – A Journey Within (2022), designed and directed by Dadi Pudumjee for the Ishara Puppet Theatre Trust, and Mallika Sarabhai's The Conference of the Birds (2023) for the Darpana Academy of Performing Arts in Ahmedabad. He has also worked in film as a performer and choreographer, including Happy Journey (2014), Cappuccino (2014), Phuntroo (2016), the short film In Search of Happiness (2018) and Chitrakut (2022).

== Dance for Parkinson's ==
Pawar has said he first encountered dance classes for people with Parkinson's in London in 2004. He began classes in Pune in 2009, after a screening of a Mark Morris Dance Group film about its Dance for PD programme at his festival drew interest from members of a local Parkinson's support group. The classes started as a pilot hosted at Pune's Sancheti Hospital with as few as three participants, and later moved to his studio.

The free classes draw on the Dance for PD method and blend elements of ballet, Kathak and jazz, with online sessions that have continued since the COVID-19 pandemic. The programme runs under Pawar's Avartan Dance Foundation and has had more than 1,000 participants in online and in-person classes across India; as of 2025 around 186 people took part in Pune alone, with remote participants elsewhere in India and in Germany, and the foundation works with neurologists to assess participants' progress. In 2025 Pawar received certification from the Mark Morris Dance Group, which developed the Dance for PD programme. He has said his students in these classes dance "only for joy".

== Fellowships and recognition ==
For the 2024–25 cycle Pawar received the Bowen Award, given through the Dance for PD programme of the Mark Morris Dance Group, for the project Rhythms of Resilience.

In 2024 he received the Berlin Fellowship of the JUNGE AKADEMIE at the Akademie der Künste, Berlin, in the performing arts section, with a residency project on the role of memory in contemporary dance. In 2026 his work was included in Vessel & Voyager, an exhibition of the JUNGE AKADEMIE fellows at the Akademie der Künste (13 March – 10 May 2026).
