= Ratan Thiyam =

Indian theatre director (1948–2025)

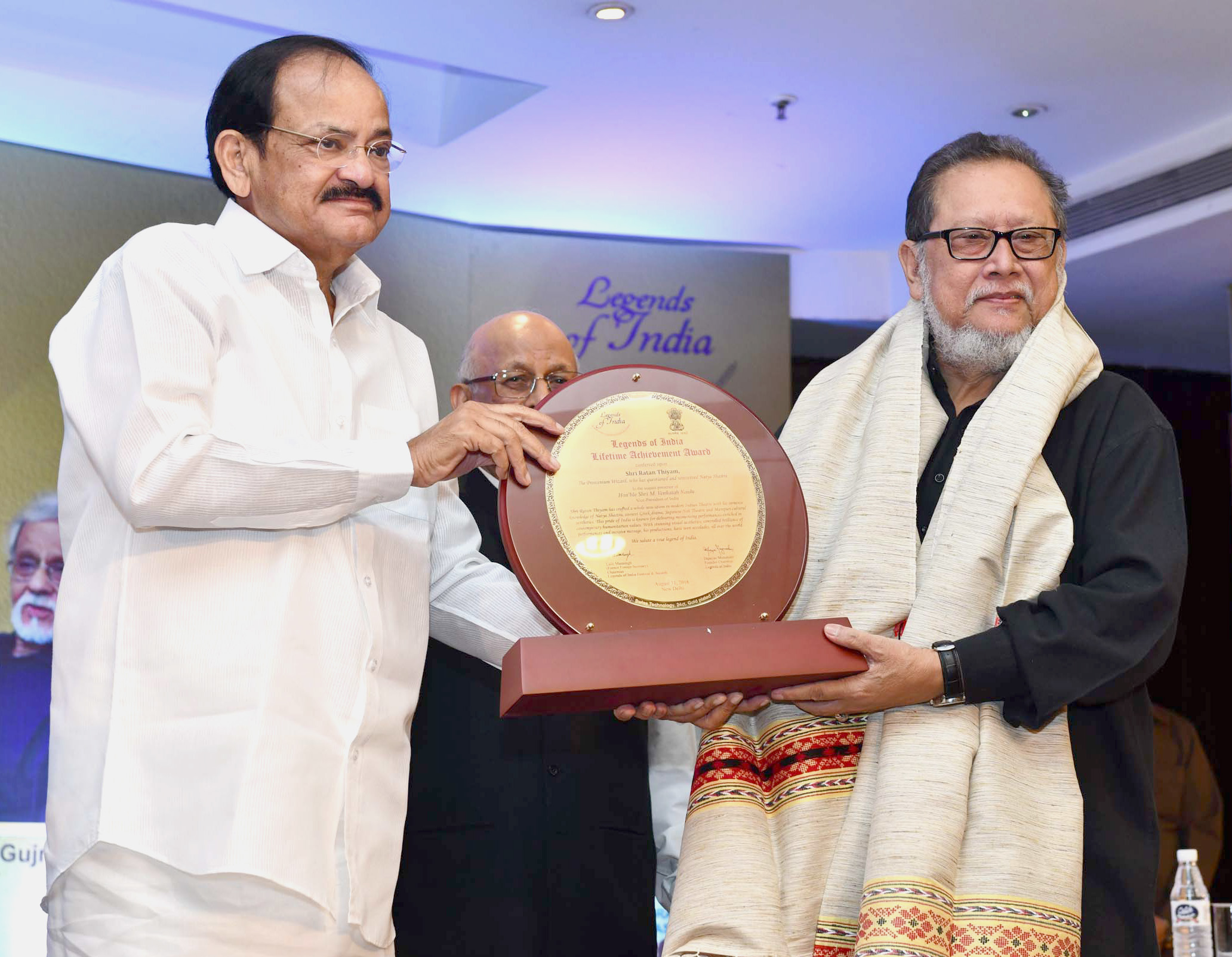
- Thiyam receiving the "Legends of India - Lifetime Achievement Award" from M. Venkaiah Naidu, 2018
- Born: 20 January 1948; Nabadwip, West Bengal, India
- Died: 23 July 2025 (aged 77); Lamphelpat, Imphal, India
- Other name: Oja
- Education: National School of Drama
- Occupations: Playwright, Theatre Director; Founder Chorus Repertory Theatre, 1976
- Years active: 1974–2024
- Organization: Chorus Repertory Theatre
- Awards: Sangeet Natak Akademi Award in Direction, 1987; Padma Shri (1989); Sangeet Natak Akademi Fellowship 2012

Ratan Thiyam (20 January 1948 – 23 July 2025) was an Indian playwright, theatre director and teacher from Manipur. He was a leading figure of the post-independence "Theatre of Roots" movement of decolonisation in Indian theatre, along with stalwarts like KN Panikkar, BV Karanth, Habib Tanvir, Bansi Kaul, and Jabbar Patel. In a career spanning over five decades, he is best known for amalgamating traditional Manipuri performance styles with contemporary theatrical forms to create a new language with plays like Uru Bhangam, Karnabharam, Chakravyuha, Ritusamhara, and Uttar Priyadarshi. This won him critical acclaim in India as well as internationally, through his theatre company, Chorus Repertory Theatre, which was formed in Imphal, Manipur in 1976. it soon became a "national hub for experimental, visually rich, and socially responsible theatre". Also known as Thiyam Nemai and Oja (teacher in Meiti), Ratan Thiyam was known for writing and staging plays that use ancient Indian theatre traditions and forms in a contemporary context. A former painter, and proficient in direction, design, script and music, Thiyam was often considered one of the leading contemporary theatre gurus.

Thiyam was the first graduate of the National School of Drama from Manipur state in 1974, and went on to serve as its chairperson from 2013 to 2017. He had also worked as vice-chairman of Sangeet Natak Akademi before joining NSD. He also worked as Director of the National School of Drama from 1987 to 1989. He was awarded the Sangeet Natak Akademi Award in Direction in 1987, given by Sangeet Natak Akademi, India's National Academy for Music, Dance and Drama, and the Padma Shri given by Government of India in 1989. He was awarded the 2012 Sangeet Natak Akademi Fellowship, the highest honour in the performing arts conferred by the Sangeet Natak Akademi, India's National Academy for Music, Dance and Drama. In the year 2013, Ratan Thiyam received an honorary D.lit. from Assam University, Silchar.

== Early life and education ==
Thiyam parents, Thiyam Tarun Kumar and Bilasini Devi, were noted Manipuri dancers and teachers. It was during a tour in Nabadwip, West Bengal, when Thiyam was born. He grew up in Imphal and often travelled with them in their troupe. He graduated from National School of Drama, New Delhi in 1974, where he trained under theatre doyen Ebrahim Alkazi During this period, he acted in Alkazi’s noted production, Andha Yug, done in kabuki style at the Purana Qila open-air theatre, where he played the role of Yuyutsu.

== Career ==
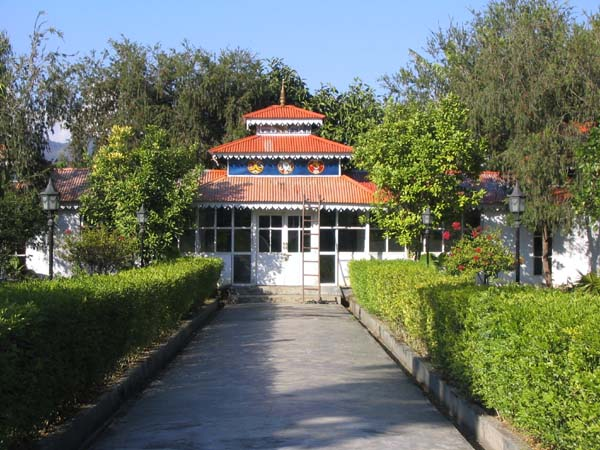
Chorus Repertory Theatre founded by Ratan Thiyam in 1976

He went on to set up a theatre group called Chorus Repertory Theatre in Imphal, Manipur in 1976. He was also briefly the director of National School of Drama (NSD), New Delhi (1987–88).

His play Chakravyuha (1984) got him immediate praise and is now considered a modern classic. His production of Ajneya's Uttar Priyadarshi in Meitei was staged at the 1st Bharat Rang Mahotsav (BRM), the annual theatre festival of National School of Drama (NSD), Delhi in 1999, his presentation of Kalidasa's epic poem Ritusamharam was closing production of 4th BRM in 2002, subsequently the 10th BRM in 2008, which also marked the golden jubilee of NSD, opened at Kamani Auditorium, New Delhi, with a performance was Prologue, the first part of his Manipur Trilogy, when all past alumni have gathered for the festival. The 12th BRM in January 2010 featured Ratan Thiyam's When we Dead Awaken.

== The plays of Ratan Thiyam ==
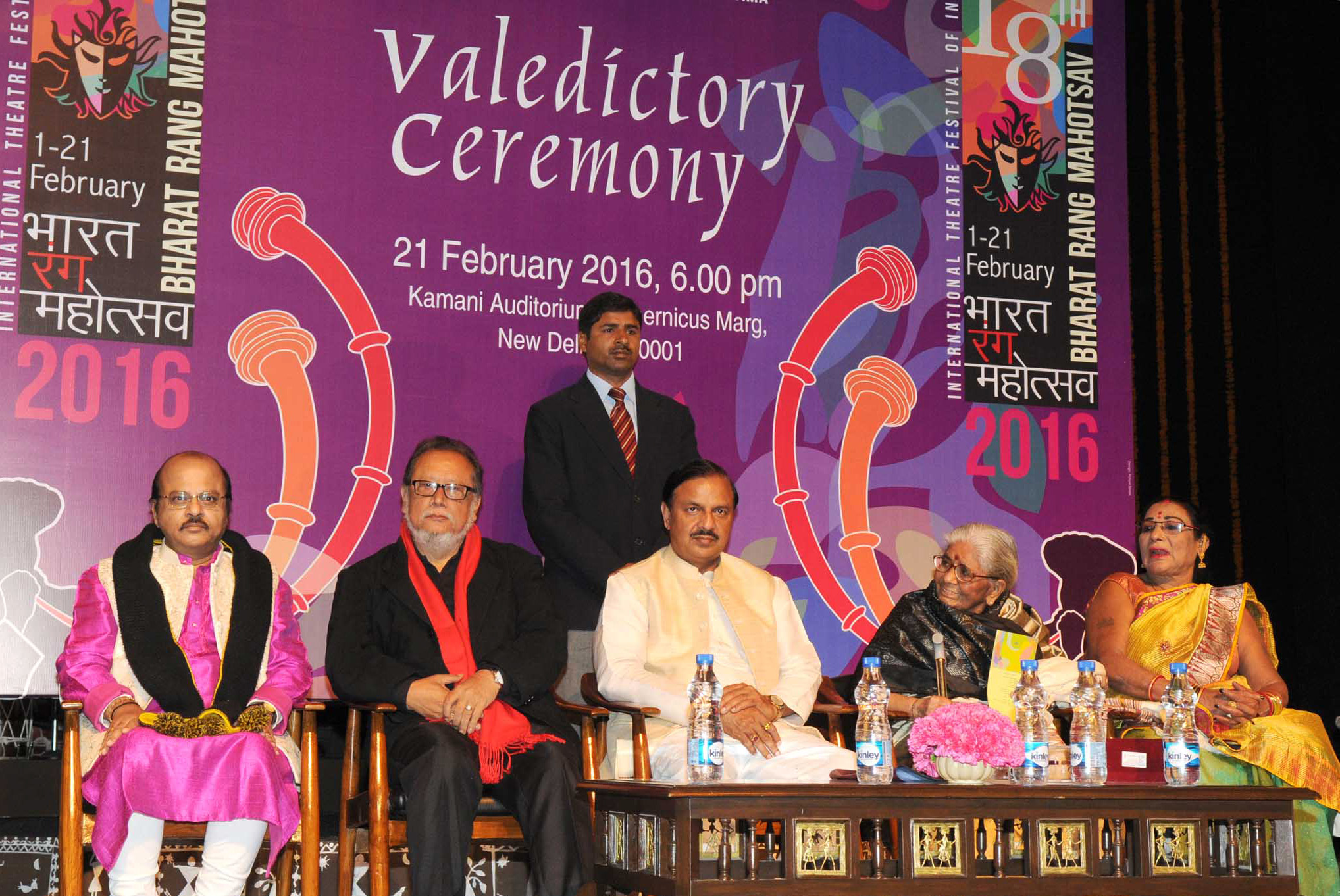
Ratan Thiyam at the “Valedictory Ceremony of Bharat Rang Mahotsav” at Kamani Auditorium, 2016

His works express a deep concern for social welfare and spiritual yearnings amidst the political chaos of the modern world. His plays infuse rationalised and multifaceted analysis of myriad perspectives. Using ingenious theatrical stagecraft, his plays are marked by literary beauty and profound meaning. Most of Ratan Thiyam's plays are thematically Indianized and are profound, with universal appeal. Most of his plays were in his native Manipuri language (Meitei). They incorporated indigenous traditions like the Wari Liba, a Manipuri storytelling form, Thang-Ta, a martial arts style, and Pung, the Manipuri drum. He was also an expert practitioner of Thang-Ta.

His productions are characterised by tightly choreographed movement sequences, visual tableaux, ritualistic repetitions, silence, minimal dialogue, and nuanced lighting designs, creating a meditative and immersive theatrical experience. His works are strongly influenced by Natya Sastra, an Indian theatre style propounded by Bharata during the second century B.C., as also ancient Greek drama, the Noh theatre of Japan and Metei performing arts. His approach to theatre was shaped by years of study under the tutelage of several major exponents of the traditional Meitei performing arts. Thiyam is also known for his use of traditional martial arts, of Thang-Ta in his plays, such as in Urubhangam (Broken Thigh), of Sanskrit playwright Bhāsa itself based on an episode from epic, the Mahabharata, which along with Chakravyuh (Army Formation) is considered one of his finest works. In 1986, he adapted Jean Anouilh's "Antigone" as Lengshonnei, a comment on the personal behaviour of politicians, failing to handle political situation in the state. Uttar Priyadarshi (The Final Beatitude), an adaptation of Hindi verse play by playwright and poet Agyeya in 1996, based on a story of redemption of King Ashoka, a man's struggle against his own inner dark side and a plea for peace, knowing its impact on future generation. The play has since travelled to many parts of the South Asia, Australia and the US.

His play Andha Yug (The Blind Age), known for creating an intense and intimate experience, around the epochal theme, was famously staged in an open-air performance, at Tonga, Japan, on 5 August 1994, a day before the forty-ninth anniversary of Atomic Holocaust in Hiroshima.

His major plays include Ritusamharam: The work seeks solace and sanity amidst the chaos and violence of today's world. In 2014, Thiyam opened a Manipuri adaptation of Macbeth, translocated to a historical Meitei context, with names of characters unchanged. It was the opening act at the 2019 inaugural Bangladesh International Theatre Festival.

== Death ==
Thiyam died at the Regional Institute of Medical Sciences (RIMS), Lamphelpat, Imphal, on 23 July 2025, at the age of 77, after a prolonged illness of post-COVID health complications. Upon his death, the Manipur state government declared a day of state mourning, and in its message called him, "a towering figure in Indian theatre and a cultural icon of Manipur." His son, Thawai Thiyam, is also theatre actor and director, and a part Chorus Repertory Theatre; he has directed plays like Bacchae, a Meitie adaption of Greek tragedy by same name.

== List of plays ==
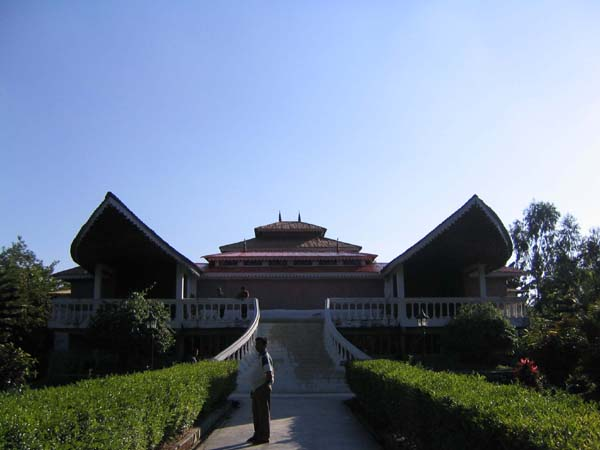
'The Shrine', the main theatre of Ratan Thiyam's Chorus Repertory, Imphal

- Karanabharam (1979) (Karna-bhara: Karna's burden by Sanskrit playwright Bhasa)
- Imphal Imphal (1982)
- Chakravyuha (1984) (Army Formation)
- Lengshonnei (1986) (An adaptation of Jean Anouilh's Antigone)
- Uttar Priyadarshi (The Final Beatitude, by Hindi playwright Agyeya) (1996)
- Chinglon Mapan Tampak Ama (Nine Hills One Valley)
- Ritusamharam (Ritusamharam by Sanskrit playwright Kalidasa)
- Andha Yug (The Blind Age, by Hindi playwright Dharamvir Bharati)
- Wahoudok (Prologue)
- Ashibagee Eshei (based on When We Dead Awaken, by Norwegian playwright Henrik Ibsen) (2008)
- Lairembigee Eshei (Song of the Nymphs)
- The King of Dark Chamber (Raja, 2012), based on a play Raja (1910) by Rabindranath Tagore.

== Awards ==
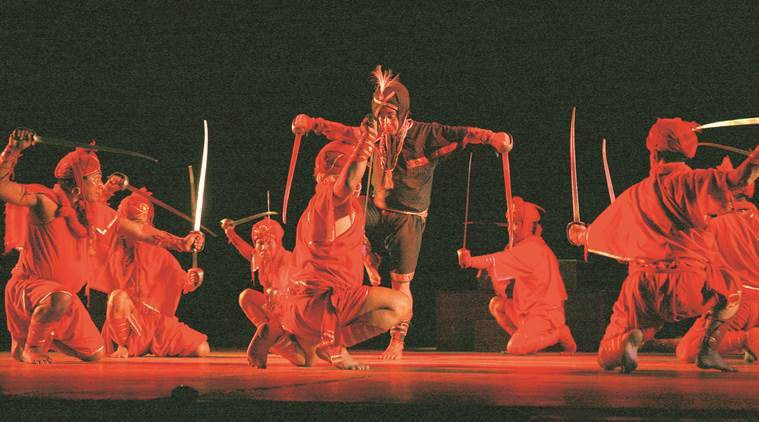
"Ratan Thiyam The Man of Theater" (2022), a play based on the life of Ratan Thiyam

- 1984: Indo-Greek Friendship Award, 1984 (Greece)
- 1987: Sangeet Natak Akademi Award
- 1987: Fringe Firsts Award, from Edinburgh International Festival
- 1989: Padma Shri
- 1990: Diploma of Cervantino International Festival, (Mexico)
- 2005: Kalidas Samman
- 2008: John D. Rockefeller Award
- 2011: Bharat Muni Samman
- 2012: Sangeet Natak Akademi Fellowship (Akademi Ratna)
- 2013: Bhupen Hazarika Foundation Award
- 2016: K.C. Das Commerce College National Achiever Award

== In popular culture ==
Some Roots Grow Upwards a 2003 documentary by Kavita Joshi and Malati Rao, was based on the life and work of Ratan Thiyam, especially his political ideologies, and his use of theatre as medium of political protest.

== Sources ==
- Aparna Bhargava Dharwadker (2005). Theatres of independence: drama, theory, and urban performance in India since 1947. University of Iowa Press. ISBN 0-87745-961-4.
- Gabrielle H. Cody; Evert Sprinchorn (2007). The Columbia encyclopedia of modern drama, Volume 2. Columbia University Press. ISBN 978-0-231-14424-7.
