= Rajinder Nath =

Indian theatre director (1934–2025)

- Born: 17 August 1934; Dalwal, Punjab Province, British India
- Died: 24 July 2025 (aged 90); New Delhi, India
- Education: Kirori Mal College, University of Delhi
- Occupations: Theatre director, educator, actor, editor
- Known for: Founder of Abhiyan theatre group (1967); Director Shri Ram Centre for Performing Arts (1976-1981), (1983-1989)
- Awards: Sangeet Natak Akademi Award (1977)

Rajinder Nath (17 August 1934 – 24 July 2025) was an Indian theatre director, actor, educator and editor who contributed to the development of contemporary Hindi theatre and Group theatre movement in New Delhi. He founded the theatre group Abhiyan in 1967, which became known for staging Hindi translations of plays originally written in other Indian languages, particularly Marathi, Kannada and Bengali. His productions included works by Vijay Tendulkar, Badal Sircar, G. P. Deshpande, Girish Karnad and Mohan Rakesh.

He remained the director of the Shri Ram Centre for Performing Arts (SRCPA) from 1976 to 1981 and again from 1983 to 1989. He established the Shri Ram Centre Repertory Company, Annual theatre festival and basement theatre, a performance space for experimental and amateur theatre groups in Delhi. In 1977, he received the Sangeet Natak Akademi Award for theatre direction in 1977 from Sangeet Natak Akademi, India's National Academy of Performing Arts.

== Early life and education ==
Nath was born in a village Dalwal, in the present-day Chakwal District of Pakistan, then part of British India. His interest in theatre began in childhood when he performed a brief role in a village Ramlila. He later did his M.A. in Engish literature from Kirori Mal College, University of Delhi. During this period, English Professor and theatre practitioner Frank Thakurdas, became his mentor. When Thakurdas established the Kirori Mall college theatre society The Players in 1957, Nath became its founder-president. It later became a noted undergraduate theatre society in Delhi. He later trained in theatre arts in the Asian Theatre Institute, Delhi, which later merged with National School of Drama.

== Career ==
Nath started his career by briefly teaching English literature at Kirori Mal College and as theatre critic with the Hindustan Times, Delhi. Thereafter in 1965, he joined Rajdhani College, University of Delhi, as a lecturer in English literature, where he taught until his retirement in 1994. Throughout his academic career, he remained actively involved in theatre direction and production. In 1967, he founded theatre group Abhiyan, in New Delhi whose founding members included actors Kulbhushan Kharbanda, T. P. Jain and Sudha Chopra. Over the following decades, its productions staged contemporary Indian plays in Hindi, based on works by Indian playwrights, featuring performers including Om Puri, Ram Gopal Bajaj, S. M. Zaheer, Uttara Baokar and Sushma Seth. Abhiyan is credited for its role in the development of contemporary group theatre in northern India, and especially Hindi theatre in Delhi, during the 1960s and 1970s.

Nath served two terms as director of the Shri Ram Centre for Art and Culture, New Delhi, from 1976 to 1981 and from 1983 to 1989. In 1980, he started the SRCPA Repertory Company and also its Annual Theatre Festival. During his tenure, he converted a basement storage area into an intimate performance venue, 'Basement Theatre', which soon got associated with experimental theatre and smaller productions. It contributed to the development of alternative theatrical spaces within Delhi's Mandi House cultural district, and remained active for more than two decades. In 1999, the National School of Drama appointed Nath as editor of its English-language journal Theatre India.

In an era when adaptations of western plays were popular, he especially used plays written in Hindi, or translated from works by leading Indian playwrights. Over the decades, his major productions included, Vijay Tendulkar's Ghashiram Kotwal in the 1970s, with actors including Om Puri, Ram Gopal Bajaj and Vinod Nagpal, and music by Mohan Upreti. This was followed by Jaat Hi Poochho Sadhu Ki (1978), adapted from Tendulkar's Marathi play Pahije Jatiche. First performed at the Shri Ram Centre Basement Theatre, the production continued to be revived over several decades till 2004, retaining the original cast. His other productions included Tendulkar's Kamala, Mitrachi Goshta and Kanyadan; Badal Sircar's Pagla Ghoda and Sari Rat; G. P. Deshpande's Uddhwasth Dharmashala and Andhar Yatra, Girish Karnad's Nagamandala, Mohit Chattopadhyay 's Guinea Pig (Raajrakto), and Mahasweta Devi's, Hajar Churashir Maa, all translated into Hindi.

His productions Panchhi Aise Aate Hain, Guinea Pig and Ghasiram Kotwal were awarded the Best Production of the year by Sahitya Kala Parishad of Delhi. He received the Sangeet Natak Akademi Award for theatre direction in 1977. His longtime associate Subhash Gupta, took over the direction of Abhiyan in 2019.

== Personal life ==
His partner was Santwana Nigam (1933–2019), a writer, teacher and translator who collaborated extensively with Abhiyan, worked as an assistant director on approximately twenty productions. She translated plays from Bengali into Hindi.

Rajinder Nath died at his residence in Press Enclave, New Delhi on 24 July 2025 following age-related illness. He survived by his son and daughter.

== Bibliography ==
- Rajinder Nath (Monogram) by D.K. Basu. Pub. National School of Drama, 2020. ISBN 8181970942
