= Thabaton =

Lady in Meitei folklore

- Lady with seven brothers
- Lady Thabaton and her suitor Keibu Keioiba
- Other names: Thabaaton, Thaba, Thabaa
- Meitei: ꯊꯕꯥꯇꯣꯟ
- Affiliation: Meitei mythology and Meitei folklore
- Gender: female
- Region: Kangleipak (Meitei for 'Manipur')
- Ethnic group: Meitei people

Genealogy
- Siblings: 7 brothers
- Consort: Keibu Keioiba (Note: Some folklorists opined that Thabaton was just a captive of Keibu Keioiba; some opined Thabaton to be Keibu Keioiba's wife; Patricia Monaghan opined that Thabaton is a sex slave of Keibu Keioiba.)

Thabaton, lovingly called as Thaba, is a woman in Meitei mythology and folklore. She has seven older brothers who take care of her at any cost. She is kidnapped by Keibu Keioiba, a tiger-headed man, while her brothers are absent. After being held captive by the beast for some time, she is rescued by her brothers.

The story of Thabaton and Keibu Keioiba is considered a classic example of Meitei folklore.

== Legend ==
Thabaton (Meitei: ꯊꯕꯥꯇꯣꯟ) is the only daughter of her parents, after seven sons. She is the darling sister of her seven elder brothers. One day, all her brothers leave to a distant place for some time, and she is left alone at home. Before leaving, her brothers give her some code words, telling her she should only open the door when she hear the code words. An old woman at a neighboring house also hears the code words.

One night after the brothers leave, Keibu Keioiba (Meitei: ꯀꯩꯕꯨ ꯀꯩꯑꯣꯏꯕ), the tiger headed man, enters into the house of the old woman to eat her. To save herself from being killed, the old lady tells Keibu Keioiba about the young, beautiful and lonely Thabaton. Now curious, Keibu Keioiba attempts to open the door of Thabaton's house. After a failed attempt, the old lady tells him the code words. He recites the words in front of the door, and Thabaton opens the door, thinking one of her brothers has returned. Keibu Keioiba abducts Thabaton, and she is held captive (in his den or cave, depending on the version) in the middle of the thick forest.

After some time ("months" or "years" according to different versions of the story), her brothers return home and find her missing. The old woman informs them of her abduction, and the brothers search for Thabaton. After finding her, Thabaton distracts the beast by giving him a bamboo pipe (bamboo container) (Meitei: ꯎꯇꯣꯡ) to fetch water from the stream. The bamboo pipe has holes on both sides, so Keibu Keioiba can never fully fill the bamboo pipe, thereby endlessly fetching water. After burning down Keibu Keioiba's home, Thabaton and her brothers flee.

== Code words ==
The code words that was instructed to Thabaton by her brothers and later used by Keibu Keioiba to make her open the door is quoted as:

"Sana O, Naril O
Chenga Pellona
Ebung gi Ebema Thabaton
Ebung Lakle
Thong hanglo."

English translation of the code words is as follows:

"Oh! Gold, Oh! Silver,
Put on the door bar,
your brother has come,
open the door."

== Way of abduction ==
Thabaton's abduction by Keibu Keioiba varies by version.

In most versions, Thabaton is tricked by Keibu Keioiba, who recites the code words learned from the neighborhood old woman. Upon hearing the correctly said code words, she believes it is one of her brothers and opens the door.

In some versions, Keibu Keioiba recites the code words correctly, but Thabaton recognizes by his voice that he is not one of her brothers. The old woman intervenes by asking Thabaton to lend her a needle, and persuades her to open the door a crack. Keibu Keioiba, hiding behind the old woman, springs out and forces the door open forcibly open.

== Portrayal analysis ==
Thabaton is described as a woman well known for "her chastity, beauty, loyalty, and obedience to her brothers". She is described as having grown up in a poor family who lived from hand to mouth.

Thabaton is witty, using her wisdom while being abducted by Keibu Keioiba. To leave the tracks of her, she tore her clothes into small pieces and threw them on the way she was taken away so that her brothers could find her later on. In some versions of the story, Thabaton plans to kill Keibu Keioiba and the treacherous old woman. She tells Keibu Keioiba that she wants an old woman's skin. Keibu Keioiba, who dearly loves her, fulfills her wish by killing and skinning the old woman. Later, Thabaton gave Keibu Keioiba a hollow bamboo pipe (or bamboo pole) to fetch water. Keioiba Keioiba, unaware of the hollowness of the container, goes to fetch water in vain. During his absence, Thabaton and her brothers burn down the house of Keibu Keioiba, and put the woman's skin inside the house in such a way that it can be seen from outside. After realizing that the bamboo container is sabotaged, and after a crow tells him of the situation at home, Keibu Keioiba immediately returns home. Seeing the woman's skin burning inside the house, Keibu Keioiba assumes it to be Thabaton. He jumps in the house and dies in the fire. (Note: The way Keibu Keioiba was killed in this version of the story is totally different from the general version of the story.)

In the Encyclopedia of Goddesses and Heroines by Patricia Monaghan, Thabaton is described as a sex slave of Keibu Keioiba.

== Moral ==
The story of Thabaton gives the moral that "Smart person won't open door to stranger."

== Depictions in popular culture ==
- Dr. Iram Babu Singh reproduced a tape-recorded version of the story of "Thabaton" narrated by Tombi Devi, from Keinou village in Manipur in February 1980. The tale was later translated by Dr. Singh.
- In the play Yamata Amasung Keibu Keioiba (Meitei: ꯌꯥꯃꯥꯇꯥ ꯑꯃꯁꯨꯡ ꯀꯩꯕꯨ ꯀꯩꯑꯣꯏꯕ), written and directed by Heisnam Tomba, under the production of the Kalakshetra Manipur, the character of Thabaton (alias Thaba) was played by Thangjam Salini.

=== 2009 film adaption ===
Thabaton
- Keibu Keioiba (Tiger Head) character
- The appearance of the animated film character Thabaton in the 2009 Meitei language animation film "Keibu Keioiba (Tiger Head)"
- First appearance: film; 2009
- Created by: Bhumenjoy Konsam
- Based on: Thabaton
- Designed by: Bhumenjoy Konsam
- Portrayed by: Bhumenjoy Konsam
- Voiced by: Kalpana

In-universe information
- Full name: Thabaton
- Nickname: Thaba
- Species: human being
- Gender: female
- Title: Mabung Taretki Thabaton (Meitei for 'Thabaton of the seven brothers')
- Occupation: sister of 7 brothers, housekeeping
- Family: 7 siblings
- Spouse: Keibu Keioiba
- Significant other: talking crow
- Relatives: seven brothers
- Religion: Meitei religion
- Origin: Kangleipak (Meitei for 'Manipur')

In the 2009 animated film Keibu Keioiba (Meitei: ꯀꯩꯕꯨ ꯀꯩꯑꯣꯏꯕ), Thabaton's character was a challenge for the filmmakers. Her age was assumed to be between 16 and 20 years, and her eldest brother's age was assumed to be around 30. The animators found it difficult to create distinct designs that shared familial similarities for Thabaton and her brothers, all of whom were within a 10-14 year age span.

The making of Thabaton's character was extremely time-consuming in comparison to others, because animator Bhumenjoy was not used to animating women. Observing from the photos of women, artist Bhumenjoy later attempted to draw Thabaton's image. While doing so, he used to remember hairstyles, eyes, height, dresses and everything about the female character. Later on, the innocent looks of lady Thabaton was finally created.

== Similar characters ==
- Kushinada being rescued from the Yamata no Orochi
- Belle, in association with the Beast, in the fairy tale "Beauty and the Beast"
- Andromeda being rescued from the sea monster
- Sita being abducted by Ravana

== See also ==
- Lairembigee Eshei – Meitei language play
- Phouoibi Shayon – 2017 Manipuri language film
- Phou-oibi, the Rice Goddess – 2013 Meitei language ballad opera
