= Eulabeia (mythology) =

Greek mythological spirit

In Greek mythology, Eulabeia (Ancient Greek: Εὐλάβεια) was the spirit and personification of discretion, caution and circumspection. She is mentioned once in Euripides' Phoenician Women, where Eteocles suggests that prayers should be directed to Eulabeia, "the most serviceable of gods", if Thebes are to be saved.

== Sources ==
- Realencyclopädie der Classischen Altertumswissenschaft, Band VI, Halbband 11, Ephoros-Eutychos (1907), s. 1061, u. Eulabeia (German)
