= Mushtaq Kak =

Indian actor and director (1961–2023)

- Born: 1961
- Died: 19 November 2023 (aged 62)
- Occupations: Director, actor

Mushtaq Kak (1961 – 19 November 2023) was an Indian theatre and television director, theatre activist and actor, known for his work on plays such as Andha Yug, Malika, and Pratibimb. Through his career, he directed around 100 plays, acted in two dozen Hindi film, and directed 30 drama series for Doordarshan. He remained the director of Shri Ram Centre for Performing Arts, New Delhi for several years and conducted workshops nation-wide. He received Sangeet Natak Akademi Award in 2015 by Sangeet Natak Akademi (India's National Academy for Performing Arts) for his contribution theatre as director.

== Life and career ==
Kak was born in 1961. His parents were both Muslims from the erstwhile Indian state of Jammu and Kashmir. His father was a Kashmiri Muslim from Srinagar, while his mother was a Dogra Muslim from Jammu.

Kak had been associated with the Shri Ram Centre as an artistic director. He also received the Best Director award for Andha Yug, Malika, and Pratibimb, and in 2015 won the Sangeet Natak Akademi award. Of his plays, Maha Brahmin and Alladad were judged the best plays for the years 1999 and 2000, respectively. His production Andorra with Kartik Chaudhry as Pyder was a big hit. He directed more than 100 plays from different writers, including short stories by Saadat Hasan Manto, Anton Chekhov (The Cherry Orchard), Vijay Tendulkar (Ghashiram Kotwal), Krishan Chander (Gadhe Ke Wapsi, or Return of the Donkey), Sharad Joshi (Alladad), Vasant Kanetkar (Kasturimrug, or "Musk Deer"), Moti Lal Kemmu (Nagar Udaas), and Federico García Lorca (Blood Wedding).

== Death ==
Mushtaq Kak died on 19 November 2023, at the age of 62, after prolonged battle with cancer.

== Filmography ==
- Amal (2007) as Surgeon
- Hijack (2008) Mushtaq
- Sikandar (2009) as Moulvi Allah Baksh
- Shahid (2012)
- Vishwaroopam-I (2013) as Manawar
- Dishoom (2016) as Shopkeeper
- M.S. Dhoni: The Untold Story (2016) as Shopkeeper
- Vishwaroopam II (2018) as Manawar
- Romeo Akbar Walter (2019) as Joker
- The Family Man (2019) as General Khursheed
- Kesari (2019) as Ameer
- Shikara (2020) as Masood Saab
- I Am (2020) as Shopkeeper
- Tejas (2023) as Khatooni
- Fighter (2024) as Masood Abrar

== See also ==
- Shri Ram Centre
