= Bhanumati Rao =

Indian classical dancer and stage actress (1923–2022)

Bhanumati Rao (4 December 1923 – 12 February 2022) (sometimes spelled as Bhanumathi) was an Indian classical dancer, teacher, and stage actress. Specializing in two forms of Indian classical dance, Kathakali and Bharatanatyam, she was also an actress on stage in Malayalam-language theater. She later taught classical dance and music, and in 2019, was the subject of a documentary film about her life, made by director R.V. Ramani.

== Career ==
Rao studied dance as a child, but left India for the United Kingdom at the age of 24 to study library science. While in the United Kingdom, she began her career as a professional dancer, becoming a member of a dance group headed by Indian classical dancer Ram Gopal. As a member of Ram Gopal's troupe, she toured India and Europe in the 1940s, performing Indian classical dance and helping to raise funds for the colonial war effort. Following her marriage to Krishna Rao, she lived in New York in the 1950s, where she continued to perform, especially for visiting Indian diplomats and politicians including India's first prime minister, Jawaharlal Nehru. She was instrumental in introducing Indian classical dance to international audiences, and often innovated with classical techniques, incorporating aspects of other Indian classical and folk dances into her performances.

Rao returned to India after India attained Independence, and lived in New Delhi, where she established a dance school and taught two forms of Indian classical dance; Kathakali and Bharatanatyam. During this time, she also began performing in Malayalam-language theater, and often acted, directed and wrote scripts based on Malayalam literature and stories herself. She was a notable performer, and had transitioned into performing Hindi-language theater as well, memorizing her dialogues after having them written in her native Malayalam language. She was known in particular for her performance in vidhi vesham, or comic roles. Following this, she moved to Bengaluru, where she studied classical Indian Carnatic music. Although she stopped performing dance in the 1990s, she continued to practice dance through her life, into her 90s, and in 2016, a video of Rao dancing classical Bharatanatyam at the age of 92 went viral, leading to a revived interest in her career.

Rao was active in social efforts to establish women's rights, and worked with the All India Women's Conference.

In 2019, she was the subject of a documentary film, Oh That's Bhanu, about her life. It was made by filmmaker R.V. Ramani, and documented her career in dance as well as her later struggles with memory loss. The film later won the Bala Kailasam Memorial Award 2019, and was screened at the Mumbai Academy of the Moving Image festival in 2019.

== Personal life ==
Rao was born in Kozhikode, Kerala in 1923. She met her husband, Krishna Rao, a lawyer, while on tour in the 1940s. They had two daughters, Tara Krishna Rao, and Maya Krishna Rao, who is also a dancer. For a period of ten years, in the 1990s, Rao retreated from public life and lived in an ashram (a Hindu spiritual hermitage) in Himachal Pradesh. She died on 12 February 2022 at the age of 98.
