= Keibu Keioiba =

Half man, half tiger of Meitei folklore

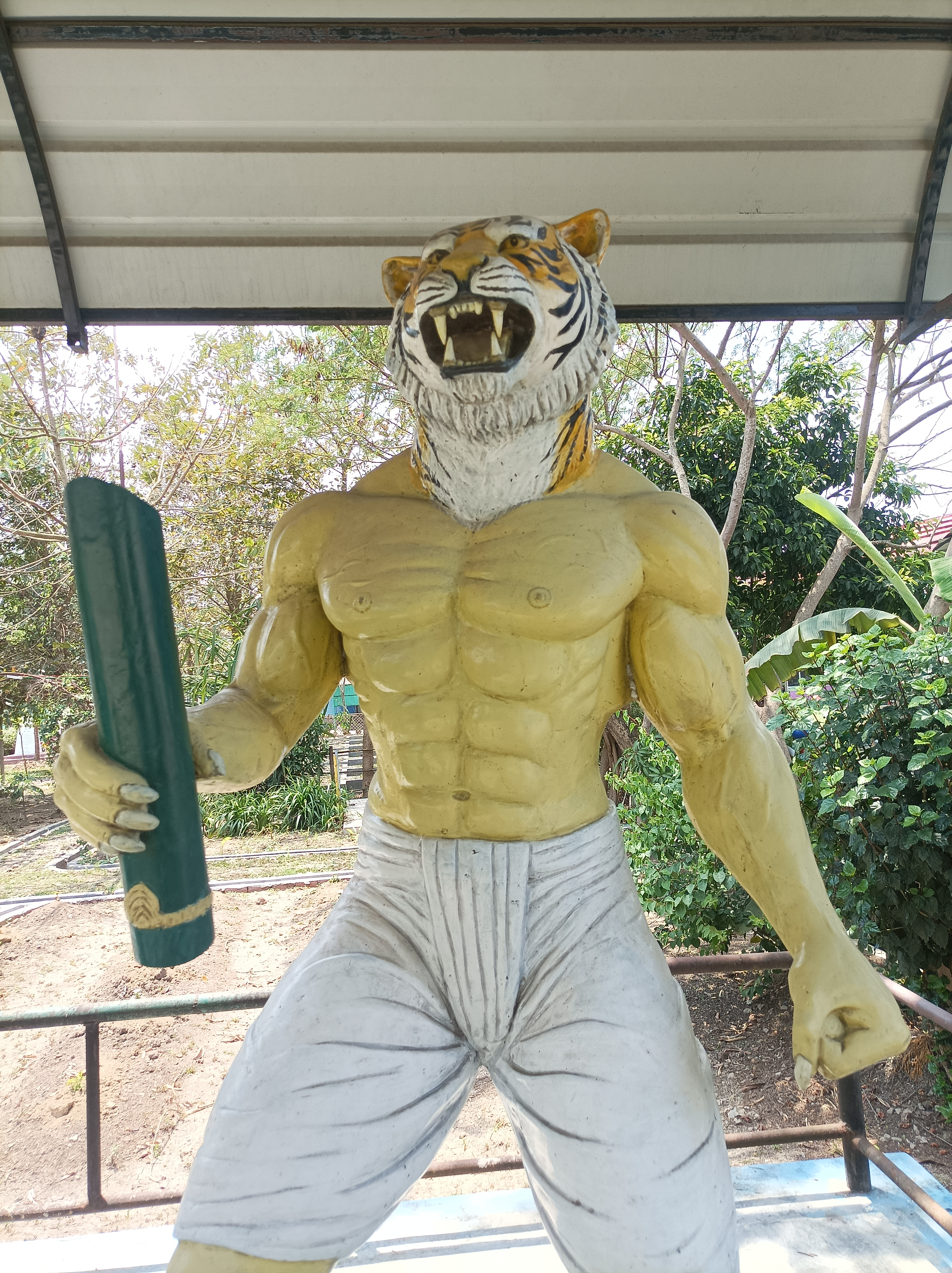
- A life-size statue of Keibu Keioiba in the Menjor Multipurpose Research Centre and Unity Park, Khangabok

Creature information
- Other name: Kabui Salang Maiba
- Grouping: monster
- Similar entities: The Beast of Beauty and the Beast; Ravana, a demon in Hindu mythology; Yamata no Orochi, a beast in Japanese mythology
- Folklore: Meitei folk tale

Origin
- Country: India
- Region: Manipur

Keibu Keioiba
- Keibu Keioiba trying to devour the old woman.
- First appearance: Keibu Keioiba; 2009
- Created by: Bhumenjoy Konsam
- Voiced by: Bishwamittra

In-universe information
- Alias: Kabui Salang Maiba
- Species: man with the head of a tiger
- Spouse: Thabaton
- Origin: Manipur
- Nationality: Indian

Keibu Keioiba, also known as Kabui Keioiba, is a mythical creature with the head of a tiger and the body of a human in the Meitei mythology and folklore of Manipur. According to legend, he was once a skillful priest named Kabui Salang Maiba. He used witchcraft to turn himself into a ferocious tiger. As punishment of his pride, he could not completely turn back to his original human form.

== Story ==
Keibu Keioiba was a human in the daytime and a tiger at night. During night, he prowled around looking for food. One night, he found an older woman's house and planned to devour her. The old woman said that her wrinkled skin would not be tasty and suggested that he eat a beautiful and young woman named Thabaton instead. Thabaton was the only sister in a family with seven brothers. The old woman told Keibu Keioiba that her brothers had gone for a work and that Thabaton was alone. The old woman helps Keibu Keioiba to trick Thabaton into opening the door to her house and succeeded in making Thabaton(?). Keibu Keioba kidnaps Thabaton.

Shortly after this, Thabaton's brothers return home from work and discover that Thabaton is missing. They ask the old woman about their sister, and she tells them about Keibu Keioiba. The seven brothers prepare their weapons and set out in search of their sister. Keibu Keioiba has not eaten Thabaton. Instead, he has forced Thabaton to become his wife, and they live together in the forest. The brothers never stop searching for their sister. One day, they see Thabaton. When they get close to her, they see that she is with a man and has a baby with her. The brothers discreetly signal to Thabaton so that she knows they have arrived. When Keibu Keioiba goes away for a hunt, Thabaton meet her brothers and they plan her escape.

When Keibu Keioiba returns, Thabaton gives him a hollow utong (bamboo pipe) open at both ends. She tells Keibu Keioiba to fetch water from the stream with the utong. In Keibu Keioiba's absence, the brothers burn down Keibu Keioiba's house, kill the baby, and run away with their sister. On the other hand, Keibu Keioiba could not collect water with the utong; when he tried, the water leaked. A crow, observing his activities from a treetop mocked his foolishness. Keibu Keioiba returns home to find his son dead, his wife missing, and his house burnt to the ground. His anger knew no bounds. He charges back to the home of Thabaton and her brothers, who have prepared their weapons. As soon as Keibu Keioiba approaches them, they attack. Finally, Keibu Keioiba dies at the hands of the Thabaton's seven brothers. Thabaton and her seven brothers live happily ever after.

== Film ==
In the 2009 Meitei language animated film, Keibu Keioiba, the character of Keibu-Kei-Oiba was uniquely designed to a humanoid tiger, which had to speak dialogues in human voices. The facial structure of the character was twisted out of the normal shape of a real tiger to a little bit extend. It was done so as to bring adjustment to the human voice and the speaking actions during digitalisation. Artist Bhumenjoy faced great challenges in making the visual character of Keibu Kei-Oiba, as the character is about the combination of a human and a beast. Various faded colours were used by the drawing team to adapt to the story.

== Theatre ==
Yamata Amasung Keibu Keioiba, Yamata-no-Orochi and Keibu Keioiba, is a Meitei-language play that interweaves the stories of the two legendary creatures, Keibu Keioiba and Yamata-no-Orochi of Japanese mythology. The role of Keibu Keioiba was firstly played by Kshetrimayum Priyobrata and then secondly played by Pangambam Tyson Meitei.
