= Keibu Keioiba (film) =

2009 Meitei language animation film

- Meitei: Keibu Keioiba
- Directed by: Bhumenjoy Konsam
- Based on: Keibu Keioiba
- Produced by: Sirish Chanam
- Starring: Bishwamittra; Kalpana; Joseph
- Music by: Sorri Senjam
- Production company: Makok Production Studio
- Distributed by: Shiv VCD & Melody Video
- Release date: 2009
- Running time: 84 minutes
- Country: India
- Language: Meitei

Keibu Keioiba, also known as Kabui Keioiba (English: Tiger Head (Note: "Tiger Head" is the direct English title of the film. But it is not the direct translation of the name "Keibu Keioiba".)), is a 2009 Manipuri animation feature film, directed by Bhumenjoy Konsam. It is the first Manipuri animation film, based on the Meitei folklore. It was screened in the 11th Mumbai International Film Festival (MIFF) in 2010, under the aegis of the Ministry of Information and Broadcasting.

The ideology of producing the story of Keibu Keioiba in the animated cinema was for the preservation of the nearly extinct Meitei folktales of Manipur.

== Plot ==
A priest named Salang Maiba was very proud of his own talents. One night, he asked his wife to cover his body with his cloth when he turned into a ferocious tiger so that he could be transfigured back to his human form. Using his magic, Salang Maiba turned himself into the fearful wild beast. Horrified by the scene, his wife ran into the house and closed the door. He asked her to come out and do what he had asked her to do but she didn't came out. As time passed, the sun was about to rise up. As there was no means to get back to his human form, being in a tiger's form, he felt unsafe to live among the human settlements. So, he departed his home and the human society to live alone in the woods. In the forests, he spent a life, like a pure wild animal, living in a cave, hunting animals for prey and consuming them raw. Now, he became the Keibu Keioiba (half man, half tiger). One day, on a stormy night, Keibu Keioiba sneaked into a village to get some food. He saw a lonely old woman in a dilapidated house. He tried to devour her but she suggested he eat the flesh of a beautiful young lady named Thabaton, living next to her house, who's also living alone as her seven elder brothers had gone for some work a few months ago and were not likely to return home for some time. The old woman told him the secret code words (which she had heard when one of the brothers told Thabaton) to open the door of Thabaton's house. Doing as suggested, he succeeded in opening the door and kidnapped Thabaton. He took her to his cave in the middle of the forest. Upon finding out that Thabaton was a beautiful maiden, the lust of Keibu Keioiba superseded his hunger. Keibu Keioiba made Thabaton his wife. Thabaton had no other way but to stay with him. They lived together in the cave. He brought preys from his hunt and Thabaton cooked meals from them. On the other hand, when the seven brothers returned home, they were shocked to find their lovely sister missing. The old woman from the neighboring house told the brothers that Keibu Keioiba had kidnapped their sister. Getting furious, the seven brothers came in search for Thabaton. After many weeks, they finally found her in the cave. They met her when Keibu Keioiba went away from the cave for his normal daily hunt. The brothers gave Thabaton a hollow bamboo pitcher (bamboo pipe) and told her their plans for escape. The brothers went to hide in a distant place when Keibu Keioiba returned to his cave. As per the plan, Thabaton asked Keioiba Keioiba to fetch water from the stream using the bamboo pitcher (bamboo pipe). Keibu Keioiba took the bamboo pipe from his sweetheart, unaware of the fact that the bamboo pitcher was actually hollow. He fetched some water and got back towards home. On the way, the pitcher got empty as all the water were gone. He went back to fetch some water and the same thing happened on his way back to home. He fetched again and again and everytime, the pitcher got empty. On the other side, the seven brothers burned down the settlement of the beast and ran away with their sister Thabaton back to their house for safety. A crow saw everything that was happening in both sides. The crow flew to the beast and informed him about what had happened to his home. Getting furious, Keibu Keioiba ran to his habitat and found out exactly what the crow had told him happened. Thabaton was then safe at her house, protected by her brothers. But the brothers prepared for a combat to defeat the beast. Keibu Keioiba came to meet the brothers face to face. They had a fierce battle until the beast was finally wounded badly. Keibu Keioiba almost escaped from the human beings when he was about to be killed.

== Cast ==
Artists Bishwamittra, Kalpana, and Joseph played the voice roles of the characters, Keibu Keioiba, Thabaton and the thief (as well as the crow) respectively.

== Release ==
In 2010, Keibu Keioiba (Tiger Head) was screened in the 11th Mumbai International Film Festival, organised by the Ministry of Information and Broadcasting in India. It was also screened in the 2nd Manipur International Documentary, Short and Animation Film Festival, 2010, organised by the Films Division, Mumbai, in collaboration with the Manipur Film Development Corporation (MFDC), in the 2nd Brahmaputra Valley Film Festival in 2014.

Keibu Keioiba (Tiger Head) was screened in the half a month long "Festival of Cinemas of Manipur" event during April 2022.

== See also ==
- List of Meitei-language films
- Yamata Amasung Keibu Keioiba
- Phouoibi Shayon
- Phou-oibi, the Rice Goddess
