= Dadi Pudumjee =

Indian puppeteer awarded the Sangeet Natak Akademi Award

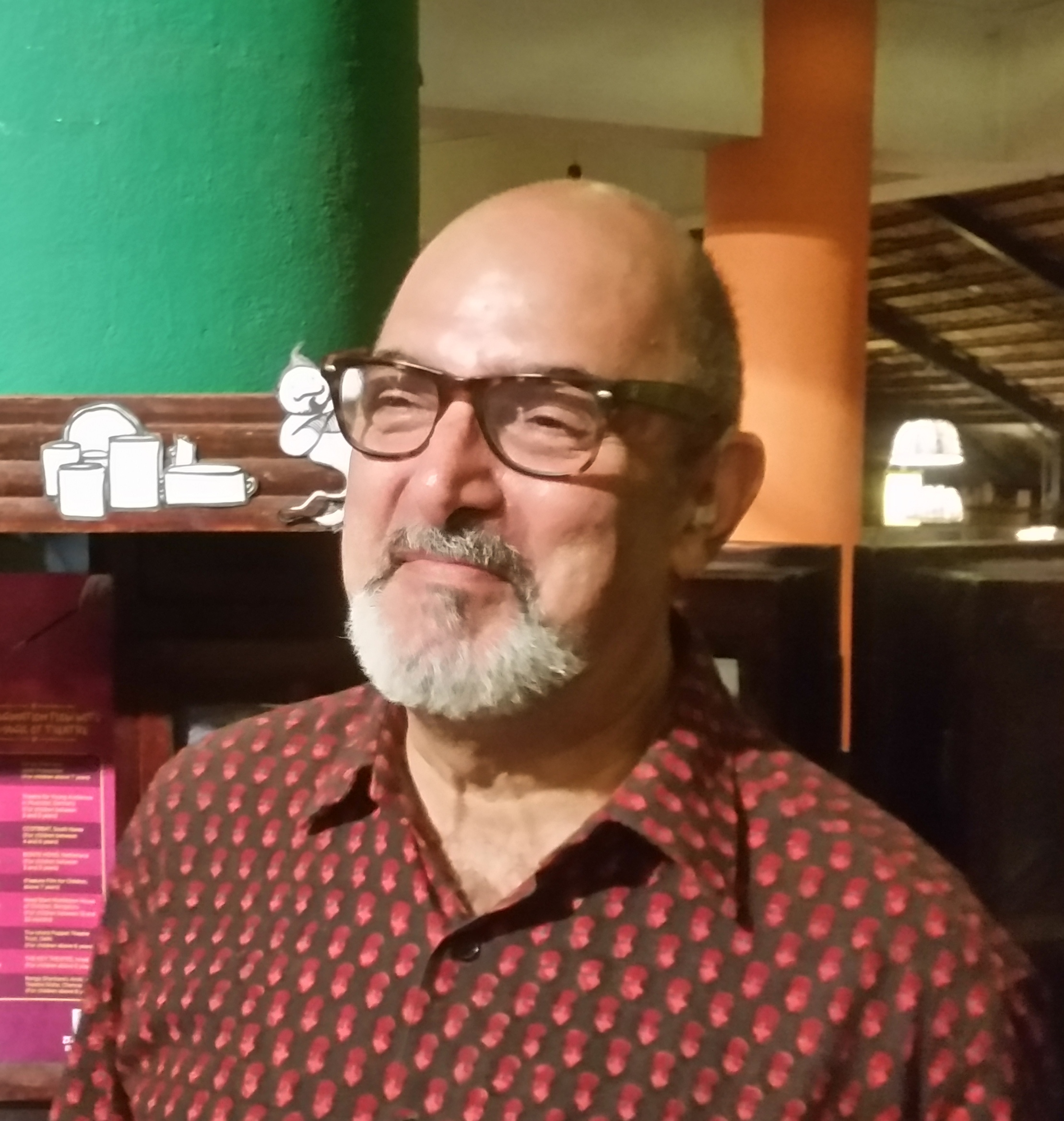
- Pudumjee at AHA! Children's Theatre Festival, Bangalore (2016)
- Born: Dadi Dorab Pudumjee; Pune, Maharashtra, India
- Education: National Institute of Design
- Occupations: Puppeteer, theatre director
- Organization: The Ishara Puppet Theatre Trust
- Known for: Indian contemporary puppetry
- Notable work: Ishara International Puppet Festival
- Awards: Sangeet Natak Akademi Award (1992)

Dadi Pudumjee is a puppeteer in India and he is the founder of The Ishara Puppet Theatre Trust. He was awarded the Sangeet Natak Akademi Award in 1992.

He is the President of UNIMA and past member of the General Council of the Sangeet Natak Akademi.

== Biography ==
=== Education ===
Pudumjee is a Parsi from Pune, where he did his university education was in Pune later at the NID National Institute of Design and Darpana Academy of Performing Arts in Ahmedabad under late Meher Contractor, after which he went to the Marionette Theatre Institute in Stockholm, Sweden, and studied puppetry under Michael Meschke.

=== Career ===
Drama and puppetry pedagogue at Var theatre Medborgahuset Stockholm Sweden, 1979 He was later a guest director at the Puppen Theatre, Berlin, GDR, Jan 1979. He directed and designed a shadow play the double shadow, on a folk tale by Vijaydan Detha.

In 1980, he founded the Sutradhar Puppet Theatre at the puppetry division at the Shri Ram Centre for Performing Arts in New Delhi and was its artistic director until 1986, after which he set up his own puppet company, The Ishara Puppet Theatre Trust.

Pudumjee's puppetry is not restricted to the more common versions of string and hand-puppets. He has also used semi-sculptural puppets that are attached to actors' bodies and carried across stage.

Ishara Puppet Theatre Trust includes a variety of other media and performers: dancers, actors, objects. Many of his performances are designed to appeal to children, but he has also, especially in his work that addresses themes such as HIV/AIDS and substance use, taken up more adult themes. He ranges freely across multiple cultural traditions. Some of his performances are adaptations of material familiar in traditional Indian theatre, like the story of Ram and Sita or his 2004 work based on the adventures of Vikram and Betaal (Vampire Tales), titled Transpositions. He has traveled widely to perform as well as teach in many countries including the U.K., Russia, Japan, Australia, Indonesia, Brazil, U.S.A, Sweden, Singapore, South Africa, Spain. Pudumjee and his troupe performed a version of the Vikram-Betaal myth at New York's La MaMa Theater.

Over the years, he has worked extensively with children, especially street children, including his 2007 project with street children of Salaam Baalak Trust, for UNESCO Paris and the EU on projects on non-formal education that address HIV and substance use. April 2008 he was elected the president of UNIMA for a four-year term - UNIMAs first non-European president in the organisation's 80-year history. He was reelected as UNMA President till 2016. Ishara Puppet Theatre Trust organises the annual Ishara International puppet festival each year in January/February in Delhi, with shows in Chennai, Jaipur and Mumbai in the previous festivals. 2010 will be the 8th season of this popular festival, with both traditional and modern puppet groups from India and abroad taking part. Ishara is known as one of India's leading modern puppet companies, Ishara creates puppet events, conducts workshops, and performances on social awareness themes. Styles range from simple rod puppets to larger than life figures and object puppetry, processional figures, shadow, glove and mixed media.

Ishara conducts workshops for various organisations, schools and NGOs in Delhi and India. 2014 Ishara created puppets for the opera A Flowering Tree directed by Vishal Bhardwaj, at the Theatre du Chatelet Paris, and also puppets for the song sequence Bismil in the film Haider by Vishal Bhardwaj.

The annual Ishara International puppet festival, organised each year in February in Delhi and other cities is in its 16th year in 2018.

== Awards ==
Awarded Padmashree by the President of India 2011

- Sangeet Natak Akademi Award, 1992
- Sanskriti Pratishan Award
- Delhi Natya Sangh Award
- Padma Shri Award
