= Shri Ram Centre for Performing Arts =

Theatre in Delhi, India

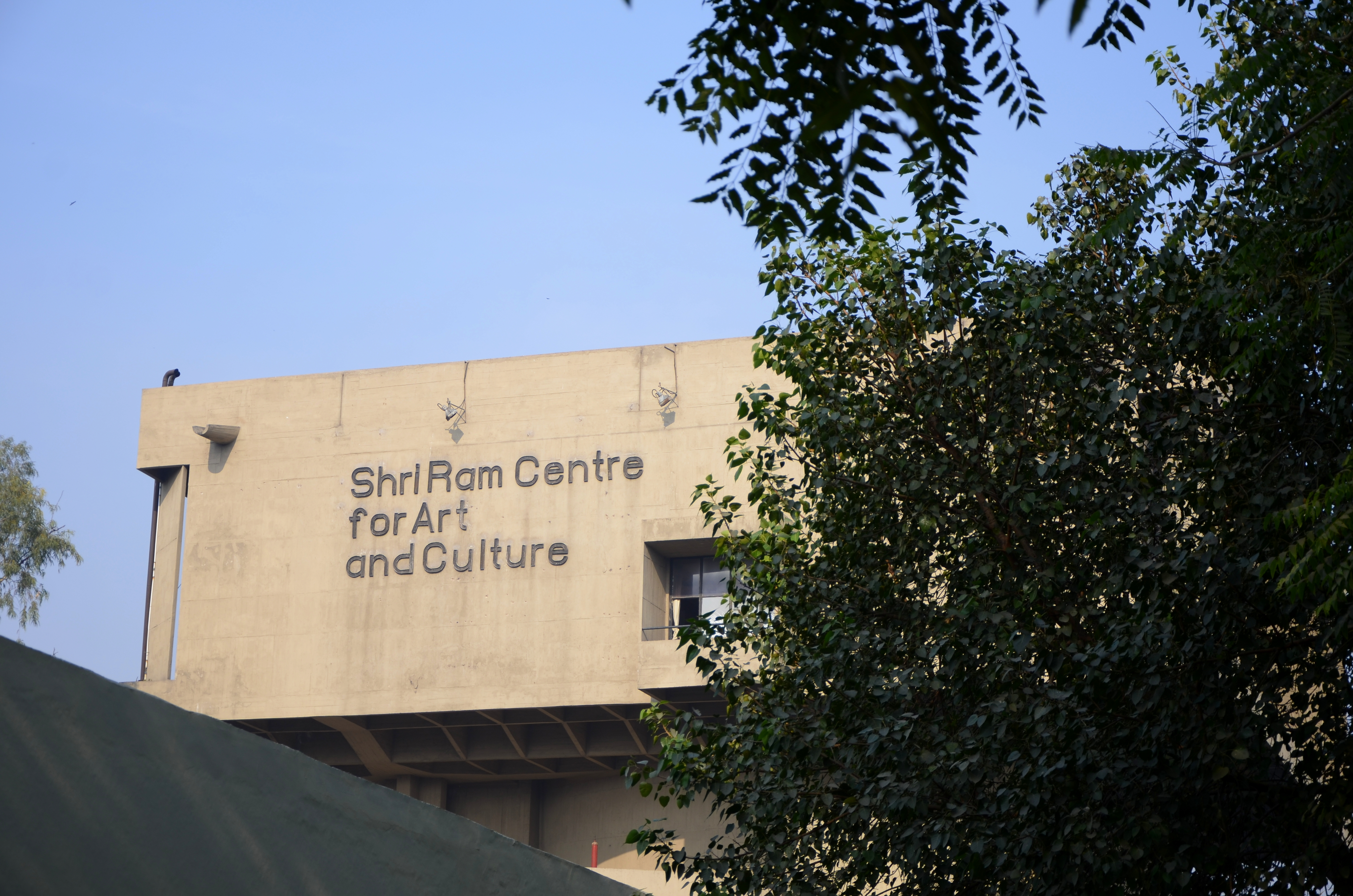
- The Shri Ram Centre for Performing Arts
- Formation: 1958
- Location: 7 Safdar Hashmi Marg, Mandi House, Delhi
- Services: Drama school
- Website: srcpa.in

The Shri Ram Centre for Performing Arts (SRCPA) commonly referred as Shri Ram Centre, is one of Delhi's noted theatre organisation and theatre venues. It is situated at Mandi House on Safdar Hashmi Marg, New Delhi, close to the Shriram Bharatiya Kala Kendra, Kamani Auditorium, Triveni Kala Sangam and the National School of Drama.

It is run by the Indian National Theatre Trust, established in 1958 the promotion of Art and Culture, with people like Sheila Bharat Ram, Kamaladevi Chattopadhyay, Nandita Kriplani and Aditya Srivastava associated with it. The Centre runs a certified two-year-acting-course. The SRCPA Theatre Repertory Company started in 1980 and Puppet Theatre company, which over the years saw the rise of modern puppetry under puppeteer Dadi Padamjee.

== History ==
The present building of the Centre opened in 1971. The Brutalist building, built between 1966 and 1969, was designed by Shiv Nath Prasad and Mahendra Raj with help from theatre doyen, Ebrahim Alkazi, and was constructed under the overall supervision of industrialist Vinay Bharat Ram of Shriram Group (DCM Ltd.), from the industrialist family of Lala Shri Ram. The Shankar Lal Murli Dhar Auditorium is a proscenium theatre with a capacity of 375 people at two levels; 300 in the stall & 75 in the balcony. The building also had basement theatre which closed after a few decades, due to municipality regulations.

Ek Tamasha Achchha Khasa, a Hindi play written and directed by Sai Paranjpye, was the inaugural play at the Centre, staged on 26 February 1971, in which G. P. Deshpande played the lead role of a simpleton king.

Rajinder Nath remained Director of SRCPA from 1976-1981 and again from 1983-1989. In 1980, he started the SRCPA Repertory Company and also its Annual Theatre Festival. He converted a basement storage area into an intimate performance venue, 'Basement Theatre', which soon got associated with experimental theatre and smaller productions. It contributed to the development of alternative theatrical spaces within Delhi's Mandi House cultural district, and remained active for more than two decades.

Since 1980s, each year, it also hold its Annual Summer Theatre Festival, Annual Shiela Bharat Ram Theatre Festival and Annual Panna Bharat Ram Theatre Festival besides being the venue of several theatre festivals, and events.

== Repertory ==
The SRCPA Repertory was set up in 1980 by theatre director Rajinder Nath. Presently, the Repertory is a full-time professional resident theatre company, performing regularly in Delhi and in other parts of the country. The company comprises 14 artists and a resident director namely, Sameep Singh (Chief of Repertory)

Over the years, the SRC Repertory Company has been working with directors like Rajinder Nath (1976-1981, 1983–89), Ranjit Kapoor, B.V. Karanth, Habib Tanveer, B.M. Shah, Bansi Kaul, Piyush Mishra, Suresh Sharma, Roysten Abel, Sanjay Upadhyay, Bapi Bose, Avtaar Sahni, Chittaranjan Tripathi, Urmil Kumar Thapliyal, Mushtaq Kak, Chetan Dattar, Rabijita Gogoi, Aniruddh Khutwad, K. Madvane, K.S. Rajendran, Zafar Sanjari, Sameep Singh, Sohaila Kapur and Niloy Roy.

== See also ==
- Shriram Bharatiya Kala Kendra
