= Raja (play) =

Play by Tagore, also called "The King of the Dark Chamber"

- Written by: Rabindranath Tagore
- Based on: Mahāvastu

Raja (Bengali: রাজা) (also known as The King of the Dark Chamber in the English translation) is a play by Rabindranath Tagore written in 1910. This play is marked as a symbolic play as well as a ‘mystic play’. The story is loosely borrowed from the Buddhist story of King Kush from Mahāvastu. A short stage version of Raja was published under the title of Arupratan in 1920.

The theme of the play is "the secret dealing of God with the human heart."

== Reception ==
Sukumar Sen described Raja as "the first really symbolic drama by Tagore."

The play became one of philosopher Ludwig Wittgenstein's favourite books; he found in it an expression of his own religious ideal.
