= Lairembigee Eshei =

Meitei language play

Lairembigee Eshei English: Song of the Nymphs
- The final scene of the play, showing the seven nymphs climbing on the seven steps, each having a white umbrella held over their heads, signifying that peace leaves an indestructible and unforgettable impression
- Original language: Meitei (officially called Manipuri)
- Written by: Ratan Thiyam
- Based on: Hellois of Meitei mythology and folklore
- Chorus: Meitei
- Characters: Chingaleima Takhengbi; Lanjinleima Piyainu; Hayenkhombi; Shaleima; Uleima; Heibongkhombi; Shananu; Ningthou; Wangban Shaphaba; Meitreng Araba; Thengraiba; Chengheiba
- Subject: Meitei mythology (Manipuri mythology) and Meitei folklore (Manipuri folklore)
- Genre: mythological fiction

Premiere
- Date: 22 February 2020

Lairembigee Eshei (Meitei: /lāi.rem.bi.gi í.səi/, lit. Song of the Goddess (Note: In Meitei language (officially called Manipuri), the word "Lairembi" means "goddess" and "Eshei" (or "Ishei") means "song". "-gi" is a suffix word to denote possession.)), also known as Song of the Nymphs, is a Meitei language play, written and directed by Ratan Thiyam, performed by the "Chorus Repertoire Theatre" of Imphal. It was shown as a closing play at the 21st Bharat Rang Mahotsav at Kamani Hall in Delhi. It was staged on the concluding day of the 9th National Prayas Natya Mela. It was also staged as the concluding event of the three-day State conference on theatre organised by the Network of Artistic Theatre Activists Kerala (NATAK) in Kochi, Kerala.

The play shows the lifestyle of mankind in the 21st century, when globalisation, worldwide mobility, communication and information are at the peak. It also shows the significance of identity, tradition, and preservation of culture even in modern eras. It attempts to remind the audiences about the challenges faced by ancestral rituals and traditions in the society.

== Plot ==
Seven nymphs have been flying around the world to see the changes in nature, environment and human society. The peace of sky, earth, water, trees, men make the nymphs fly towards the era of the 22nd century. The seven nymphs, in purely white dresses, having white lighting, slowly carry large dishes and dance gently, in accordance to the tinkling melodies. The nymphs wave their scarves and made illusions of flying across the sky. When they find out a king who is wailing after destroying nature by himself, they get to know about the importance of the protection of nature. The nymphs are shown in as entering into the underwater world, by covering their faces. At a time, some bird catchers attempt to capture the nymphs, by using their nets. However, they can't succeed and they are laughed at by the nymphs. The nymphs move around gigantic stalks of lotus, lotus leaves and lotus buds, representing the destruction of nature by human beings in metaphorical way. In the final scene, the seven nymphs climb on the seven steps. Each nymph has a white umbrella held over their heads. The umbrellas represent peace leaves an indestructible and unforgettable impression.

== Cast and credits ==
- Indira as Chingaleima Takhengbi
- Russia as Lanjinleima Piyainu
- Taruni as Hayenkhombi
- Anjelina as Shaleima
- Shandhyarani as Uleima
- Jaya as Heibongkhombi
- Rojita as Shananu
- P. Somo as Ningthou
- Ibomcha Sorok as Wangban Shaphaba
- Robindro as Meitreng Araba
- Nongdamba as Thengraiba
- Lokendra as Chengheiba
- Anish / Inaoba as Manai-I
- Ajitkumar as Manai-II
- Nongdamba as Shadanba-I
- Ajitkumar as Shadanba-II
- Lokendra as Shadanba-III
- Robindro as Shadanba-VI
- Stage Management by Robindro
- Set & Props by Nongdamba, Ajitkumar, Anish/ Inaoba
- Costume by Somo, Somorjit, Tarubi, Russia, Rojita, Shandhyarani, Indira
- Music Assistance by L. Tomba, Basanta, Somorjit
- Light Assistance by Thawai Thiyam, Angoutombi, Ibomcha Sorok
- Consultance by N. Amusana Devi, W. Keinatombi Leima
- Production Management by Ibomcha Sorok
- Assistant Direction by Thawai Thiyam
- Script, Music, Design & Direction by Ratan Thiyam

== Reception ==
Padma Shri awardee Indian professor Sunil Kothari commented on the play and the director's performance as follows:

As a director he (Ratan Thiyam) negotiates important issues, complex aesthetics and philosophical challenges. As writer of the play, Ratan uses metaphors, elements of traditional dances, rituals, improvisations and creates what one would call sheer visual poetry. For him the local and indigenous myths and legends continue to be the most effective inspiration for both verbal and non-verbal vehicle of expression and interpretation. Even when the actors deliver dialogues in Meitei language, the angikabhinaya conveys the meaning of what they are saying. It helps the onlooker if he carefully reads the synopsis in advance, as Ratan does not believe in providing subtitles in English.

== See also ==
- Yamata Amasung Keibu Keioiba
