= Mandi House =

Coordinates: 28.624172°N 77.232701°E

- Interactive map of the Mandi House area

General information
- Architectural style: Brutalist architecture
- Location: New Delhi, India
- Year built: 1940s
- Owner: Raja Sir Joginder Sen Bahadur

Design and construction
- Architect: Shiv Nath Prasad

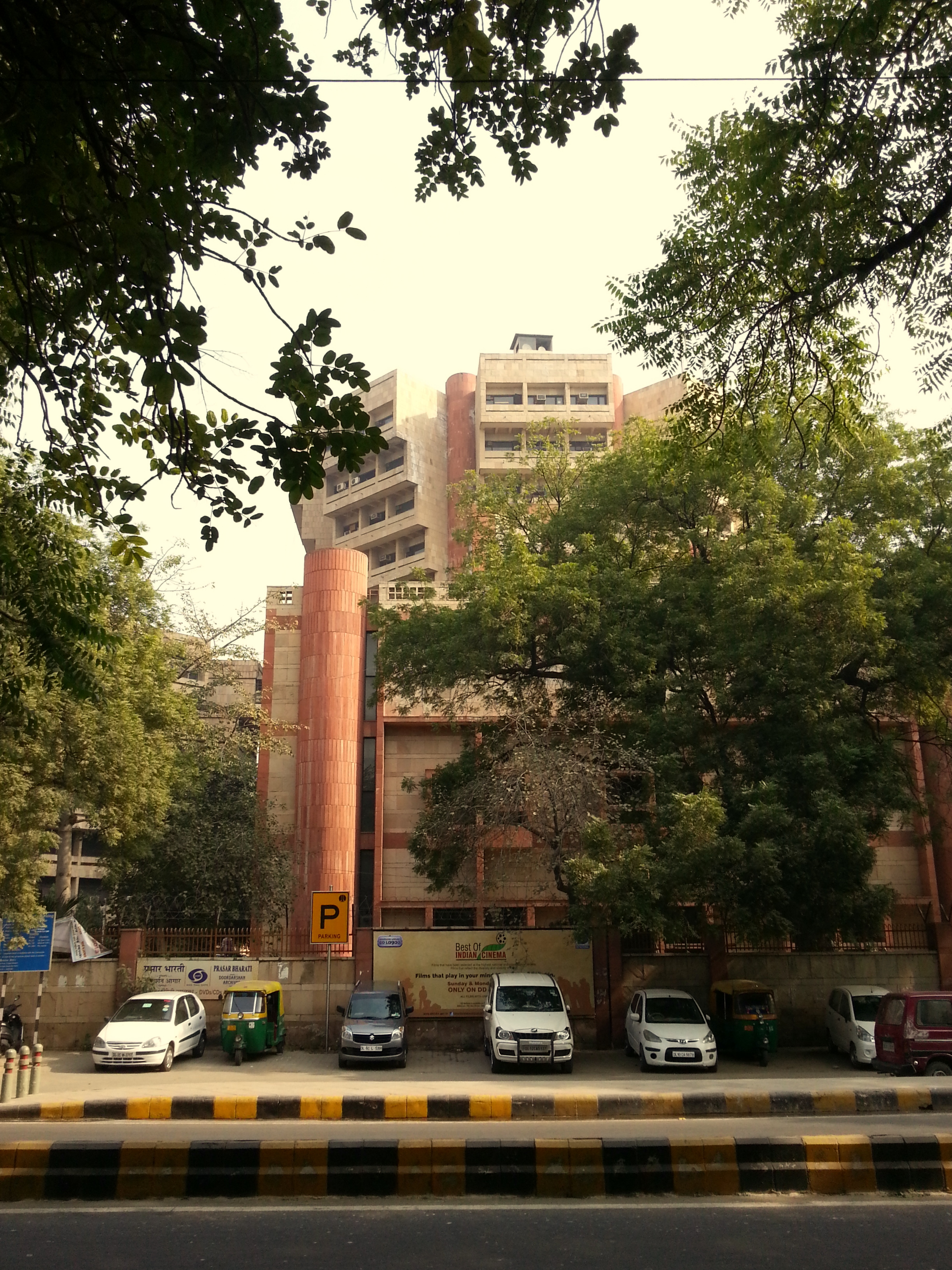
Doordarshan Bhawan, Copernicus Marg, Delhi

Mandi House is a locality in Lutyens' Delhi, India. It was the former residence of the Raja of Mandi in Delhi. It was demolished in the 1970s to make way for modern office complexes. By the 1990s, the site had been redeveloped with large institutional and government buildings, including Doordarshan Bhawan and Himachal Bhawan, anchoring a new administrative precinct. Concurrently, the area evolved into Delhi's premier arts district, centered on the National School of Drama, Shri Ram Centre for Performing Arts, and Triveni Kala Sangam, all established between 1950 and the 1960s.

== History ==
In the 1940s, the 18th Raja of Mandi State, Raja Sir Joginder Sen Bahadur built his residence next to what is now Himachal Bhawan. The estate was later sold and divided in the 1970s. The old palace was demolished to make way for large, modern offices which were constructed in the 1990s. The state house of Himachal Pradesh, Himachal Bhawan, is now located here. The headquarters Doordarshan Bhawan of the national television broadcaster Doordarshan is also located here. Today, the name of the office complex remembers the old royal residence as well the Mandi House metro station. The area gradually became a key arts district, anchored by institutional landmarks: the National School of Drama campus (post-1959), the Shri Ram Centre for Performing Arts (1960s, Shiv Nath Prasad & Ebrahim Alkazi), and the Triveni Kala Sangam (1950), all of which expanded Mandi House's identity as Delhi's cultural hub. The Agrasen ki Baoli well is located near Mandi House.

== Architecture ==
The architecture of Mandi House reflects a layered urban fabric of royal remnant, brutalist civic buildings, and mid-century cultural institutions. The Doordarshan Bhawan, designed by Raj Rewal in the 1970s features massive exposed sandstone and concrete forms, marking a departure from earlier colonial styles. Across the road, the Shri Ram Centre (designed by Shiv Nath Prasad, with input from Alkazi) showcases a cubic massing with a prominent cantilevered roof slab and stark geometric lines, a bold example of 1960s institutional brutalism in New Delhi. The Triveni Kala Sangam blends low-rise, open-plan design with classical colonnades, housing galleries, theaters, and studios around courtyards. It is an elegant fusion of modernist planning with traditional spatial arrangements.
