= Maya Krishna Rao =

Indian theatre artist (Born:1953)

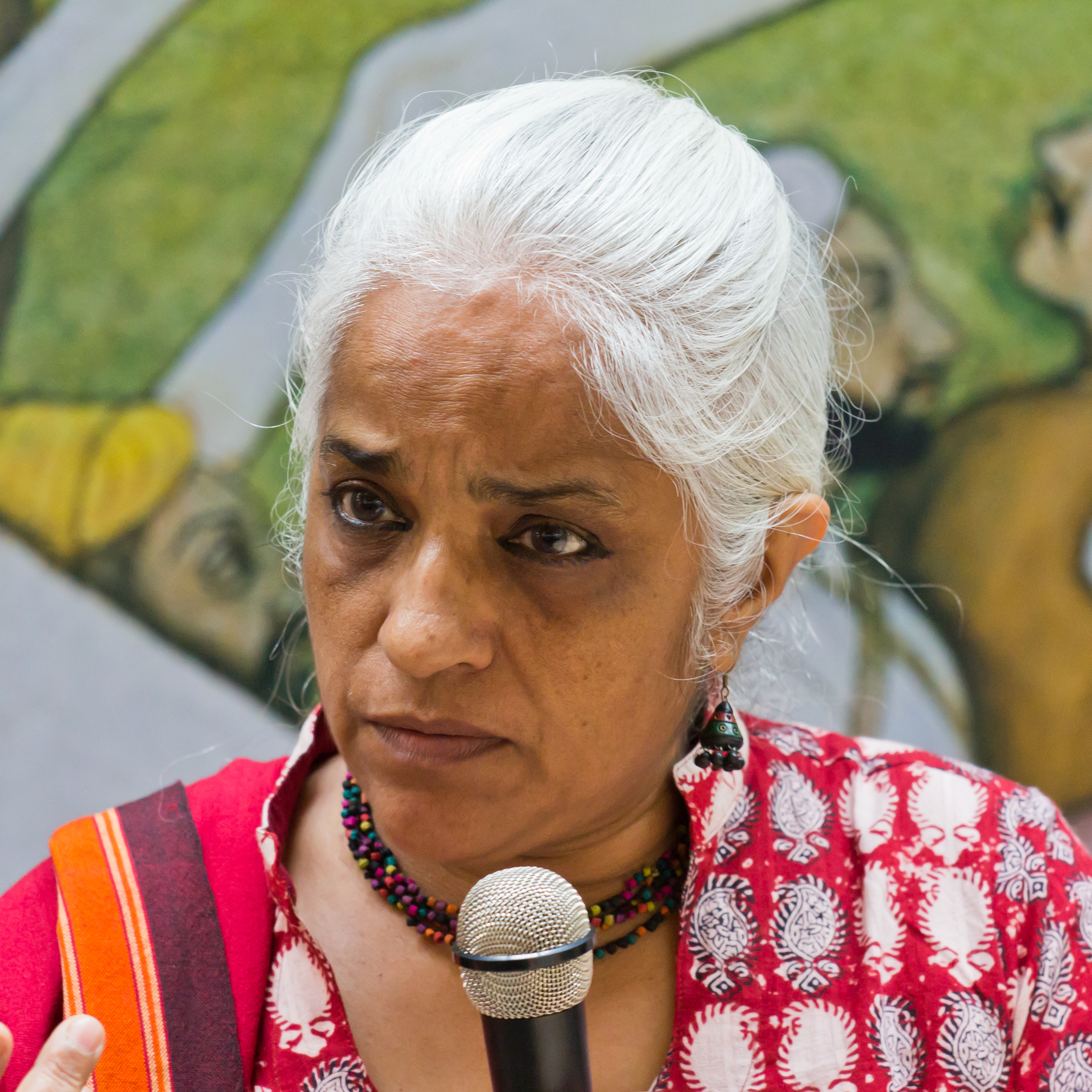
- Rao in 2012
- Born: 1953 (age 72–73); New York City, US
- Occupations: Theatre artist, teacher

Maya Krishna Rao (born 1953) is a solo Indian theatre artist, stand-up comedian and social activist. Her well-known shows include Khol Do', 'A Deep Fried Jam','Ravanama and Heads Are Meant for Walking Into. Her performances cover many genres - dance theatre, comedy, multi-media, and theatre in education. She is a recipient of the Sangeet Natak Akademi Award (2010), which she returned five years later citing growth of intolerance in India.

== Biography ==
Born in 1953 in New York City, Rao moved to India at a young age. Rao studied at Modern School, New Delhi. She completed her bachelor's degree from Miranda House, Delhi and received a Master's degree in political science from the Jawaharlal Nehru University, Delhi. She also has a degree in theatre arts from the University of Leeds. During her stay in the United Kingdom, she was briefly associated with the "Perspectives Theatre Company" in Nottingham and the "Leeds Playhouse Theatre-in-Education Company". She was inspired by her mother Bhanumathi Rao, who was associated with Malayalam theatre in the 1960s

Rao is a trained Kathakali artist; she received her training from Mampuzha Madhava Panicker and Sadanam Balakrishnan.

She is a co-founder of "Theatre Union", a street theatre group. She was Associate Professor in the department of Acting at the National School of Drama, New Delhi, between 1985 and 1990. and continued as visiting faculty thereafter. In 2013 she was appointed professor at the Shiv Nadar University, Delhi where she designed and taught a post graduate Diploma programme, TEST (Theatre for Education and Social Transformation), a first-of-its-kind in any institute of higher education in India. Rao's plays are characterised by sociopolitical themes. Her earliest plays include, Om Swaha, a critique of dowry, and Dafa No. 180, a take on the Indian rape law. Her 2012 play Walk was based on the 2012 Delhi gang rape.

]./ref>

She resides with her family in Bangalore.

== Plays ==
- Loose Woman
- Om Swaha
- Dafa No. 180
- Khol Do
- A Deep Fried Jam
- Heads Are Meant for Walking Into
- Quality Street
- The Non-Stop Feel Good Show
- Hand Over Fist – perspectives on masculinities
- Lady Macbeth Revisited
- Ravanama
- Walk
