= Yamata Amasung Keibu Keioiba =

- Original language: Meitei language (Manipuri language)
- Written by: Heisnam Tomba
- Based on: Yamata-no-Orochi of Japanese mythology and Keibu Keioiba of Meitei mythology (Manipuri mythology)
- Music by: Oinam Prasanjit (Boby) (Sound Designer); Moirangthem Bise (Music Arranger); Moirangthem Prasanta Singh (Music Operator)
- Chorus: Anantakumar Longjam; Lanchingna Laishram
- Genre: Japanese mythology and Meitei mythology

Premiere
- Place: India
- Directed by: Heisnam Tomba; Pangambam Tyson Meitei (Assistant Director)

Yamata Amasung Keibu Keioiba (English: Yamata-no-Orochi and Keibu Keioiba) is a Meitei language play, written and directed by Heisnam Tomba. It was produced by the Kalakshetra Manipur. This play weaves together the folktales of the two legendary creatures, Yamata-no-Orochi of Japan and Keibu Keioiba of Manipur.

== Background ==
Yamata-no-Orochi was a Japanese dragon the size of eight hills, with eight heads and eight tails. He has eaten seven of the beautiful Kushinada's sisters and is about to eat her when she is rescued by the god Susanoo. Meanwhile, Lady Thabaton is kidnapped by Keibu Keioiba, a mythical creature with the head of a tiger and the body of human. Thabaton's seven older brothers kill Keibu Keioiba and rescue her with the help of a wise old woman.

The play shows the qualities of sacrifice and endurance through the mythologies of Japan and Manipur. They are interwoven in such a way that the stories of the two hilltops could be narrated together.

According to Heisnam Tomba, the director of the play, the play attempts to capture the two different cultures and explore every possible interpretation. The play was an intercultural testing of stories, dance, music and performing traditional arts. It shows the modern day meaning of the rich folklore of both Japanese culture and Meitei culture.

== Cast ==
- Yamata-no-Orochi played by Maisnam Momocha
- 1st Keibu Keioiba played by Kshetrimayum Priyobrata
- 2nd Keibu Keioiba played by Pangambam Tyson Meitei
- Susanoo played by Romario Thoudam Paona
- Iben Hanubi (Old Grandmother) played by Kh. Sanjukta
- Mapa (Father) played by Ahanthem Upendro Mangang
- Mama (Mother) played by Huidrom Holina
- Kushinada played by Roslin Akoijam Chanu
- Thaba played by Thangjam Salini
- Mithingai played by Guru Koken

== See also ==
- Keibu Keioiba (Tiger Head)
- Classicism in Meitei civilization
- Intangible cultural heritage of Meitei civilization
- Women in Meitei civilisation
