= Deepak Dobriyal =

Indian actor (born 1975)

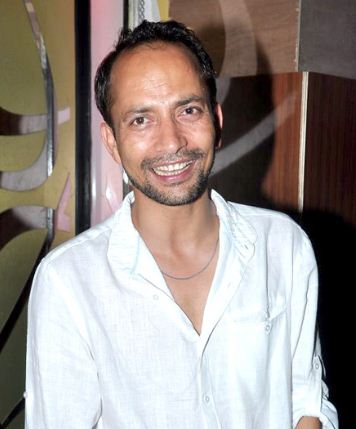
- Dobriyal in 2013
- Born: 1 September 1975 (age 50); Pauri, Uttar Pradesh (now in Uttarakhand), India
- Occupation: Actor
- Years active: 2002–present
- Notable work: Omkara, Tanu Weds Manu, Hindi Medium, Maqbool
- Spouse: Lara Bhalla (m. 2009)

Deepak Dobriyal (born 1 September 1975) is an Indian actor known for his work in several films and theatre productions. He is a recipient of several awards including a Filmfare Award, a Filmfare Award Marathi and a Maharashtra State Film Award.

He has acted in films such as Omkara (2006), Shaurya (2008), Tanu Weds Manu (2011), Dabangg 2 (2012), Chor Chor Super Chor (2013), Tanu Weds Manu Returns (2015), Prem Ratan Dhan Payo (2015), Hindi Medium (2017) and Angrezi Medium (2020).

== Early life and education ==
Deepak Dobriyal was born on 1 September 1975 in Pauri Garhwal district, Uttar Pradesh (now in Uttarakhand). His parents are from Kabra village near Rithakhal and Satpuli village, Pauri Garhwal. Later, his family moved to Delhi when he was 5 years old. There, Deepak completed his studies at Govt. Boys Senior Secondary School Begumpur. In Delhi, he lived in Katwariya Saray. Dobriyal is married to Lara Bhalla.

== Theatre career ==
He started his acting career in 1994 with eminent theatre director Arvind Gaur. His major plays with Gaur are Tughlaq, Andha Yug, Final Solutions, Desire Under the Elms, Rakt Kalyan, Court Martial, Dario Fo's Operation Three Star, The Caucasian Chalk Circle, The Good Person of Szechwan, Neil Simon's The Good Doctor and Ashok Lal's Ek Mamooli Aadmi. After six years with Asmita theatre, he joined Act One with director Pt. N. K. Sharma. He acted in Aao Saathi Sapna Dekhen, Hamaar Baabuji ki chhattri and Aksar Maine Socha Hai.

Deepak Dobriyal also appeared as an extra in the music video for Adnan Sami's song Lift Karadey (Remix) featuring duplicates of several bollywood actors. He is one of the henchmen of Ajit and he appears several times in the video but at 3:17 mark is when he can be clearly recognized standing behind Johnny Lever and Ajit.

Play	Role	Writer-Director
Tughlaq	Aazam	Girish Karnad-Arvind Gaur
Andha Yug	Praheri	Dharamvir Bharati-Arvind Gaur
Final Solutions	Javed	Mahesh Dattani-Arvind Gaur
Court-martial	Bikash Roy	Swadesh Deepak-Arvind Gaur
Desire Under The Elms	Eben	Eugene O Neill-Arvind Gaur
Rakt Kalyan	Jagdeva	Girish Karnad-Arvind Gaur
Accidental Death of an Anarchist	Dario Fo	Arvind Gaur
The Good Person of Szechwan	Raju	Bertolt Brecht-Arvind Gaur
The Good Doctor	Writer-Neil Simon	Arvind Gaur
Ek Mamuli Aadmi	Ishwar Chand Awasthi	Ashok Lal-Arvind Gaur
The Caucasian Chalk Circle	Azdak	Bertolt Brecht-Arvind Gaur
Madhavi	Galav	Bhisham Sahni-Arvind Gaur
Merchant of Venice	Bassanio	William Shakespeare-Arvind Gaur
Julius Caesar	Titinius	William Shakespeare-Arvind Gaur
Qalandar		Arvind Gaur
Aksar Maine Socha hai		N. K. Sharma
Hamaar Babuji Ki Chhatri		N. K. Sharma
Aao Saathi Sapna Dekhen	Behrupiya	Harsh Khurana-N. K. Sharma

== Film career ==
He has received recognition for his role in Omkara as "Rajju" and as a side-kick to the protagonist "Pappi" in Tanu Weds Manu (2011), a role he reprised in 2015 sequel Tanu Weds Manu: Returns and again received critical acclaims.

== Filmography ==
=== Film ===
Year	Film	Role	Notes
2002	Dil Hai Tumhara	Shepherd	
2003	Maqbool	Thapa	
2004	Charas	Afghan militant	
2006	Omkara	Rajju Tiwary	
2007	1971	Flight Lt. Gurtu	
2008	Shaurya	Captain Javed Khan	
2008	Midnight Lost and Found	Arvind	Short film
2009	Delhi-6	Mamdu	
2009	Gulaal	Rajendar Bhati	
2009	13B / Yavarum Nalam	Ashok / Senthil	Bilingual film
2010	Daayen Ya Baayen	Ramesh Majila	
2011	Tanu Weds Manu	Pappi	
2011	Teen Thay Bhai	Harpreet "Happy" Gill	
2011	Not a Love Story	Robin Fernandes	
2012	Dabangg 2	Genda	
2012	Delhi Safari	Hawa Hawaai	Voiceover
2013	Chor Chor Supar Chor	Satbir	
2014	Chal Bhaag	Munna Supari	
2015	Tanu Weds Manu: Returns	Pappi	Nominated – Filmfare Award for Best Supporting Actor
2015	Prem Ratan Dhan Payo	Kanhaiya "Mussorie" Chaturvedi	
2017	Hindi Medium	Shyam Prakash	Nominated – Filmfare Award for Best Supporting Actor
2017	Lucknow Central	Victor Chattopadhyay	
2018	Kaalakaandi	Mafia	
2018	Baaghi 2	Usman Langda	
2018	Kuldip Patwal: I Didn't Do It	Kuldip Patwal	
2019	Baba	Madhav	Marathi film Filmfare Award Marathi Best Actor
2019	Laal Kaptaan	Trecker	
2020	Kaamyaab	Gulati	
2020	Angrezi Medium	Gopi Bansal	Nominated – Filmfare Award for Best Supporting Actor
2020	Kachche Din	Taxi Driver	Short film
2021	Aafat-E-Ishq	Vikram Kamal	ZEE5 Film
2022	Good Luck Jerry	Rinku	Disney Plus Hotstar film
2022	Bhediya	Panda	
2023	Bholaa	Ashwatthama (Aashu)	
2024	Sector 36	Inspector Ram Charan Pandey	
2024	Jugnuma - The Fable	Dev's Manager	
2025	Son of Sardaar 2	Gul	
2026	Ikkis	Jahangir	Cameo
2026	Krishnavataram Part 1: The Heart (Hridayam)	Sudama, Krishna's childhood friend	

=== Television ===
Year	Title	Role	Platform	Notes
2023	Saas, Bahu Aur Flamingo	Aaygo Dao alias 'Monk'	Disney+ Hotstar	

== Awards and nominations ==
Year	Film	Award	Category	Result	Ref.
2007	Omkara	Filmfare Awards	Special Performance Award	Won	
2010	Gulaal	Producers Guild Film Awards	Best Actor in a Negative Role	Nominated	
2012	Tanu Weds Manu	Producers Guild Film Awards	Best Actor in a Comic Role	Won	
2012	Tanu Weds Manu	International Indian Film Academy Awards	Best Performance in a Comic Role	Nominated	
2016	Tanu Weds Manu: Returns	International Indian Film Academy Awards	Best Performance in a Comic Role	Won	
2016	Tanu Weds Manu: Returns	International Indian Film Academy Awards	Best Supporting Actor	Nominated	
2016	Tanu Weds Manu: Returns	BIG Star Entertainment Awards	Most Entertaining Actor in a Comedy Role (Male)	Won	
2016	Tanu Weds Manu: Returns	Filmfare Awards	Best Supporting Actor	Nominated	
2016	Tanu Weds Manu: Returns	Producers Guild Film Awards	Best Supporting Actor	Nominated	
2016	Tanu Weds Manu: Returns	Producers Guild Film Awards	Best Actor in a Comic Role	Won	
2016	Tanu Weds Manu: Returns	Zee Cine Awards	Best Actor in a Supporting Role – Male	Nominated	
2016	Tanu Weds Manu: Returns	Stardust Awards	Best Actor in a Comic Role	Nominated	
2016	Tanu Weds Manu: Returns	Times of India Film Awards	Best Supporting Actor	Nominated	
2016	Tanu Weds Manu: Returns	Times of India Film Awards	Best Actor in a Comic Role	Won	
2016	Tanu Weds Manu: Returns	Screen Awards	Best Supporting Actor	Nominated	
2018	Hindi Medium	Screen Awards	Best Supporting Actor	Nominated	
2018	Hindi Medium	International Indian Film Academy Awards	Best Supporting Actor	Nominated	
2018	Hindi Medium	Zee Cine Awards	Best Actor in a Supporting Role – Male	Nominated	
2018	Hindi Medium	Filmfare Awards	Best Supporting Actor	Nominated	
2020	Baba	Filmfare Award Marathi	Best Actor	Won	
2020	Baba	Maharashtra State Film Awards	Best Actor	Won	
2021	Angrezi Medium	65th Filmfare Awards	Best Supporting Actor	Nominated	
