= Abhinay School of Performing Arts =

- Formation: 2009
- Type: NGO
- Registration no.: 72 253 204 366 (ABN)
- Legal status: Charity
- Purpose: Culture and education related to Indian subcontinental theatre arts
- Location: Sydney, Australia
- Coordinates: 33°57′14.1″S 151°8′16″E
- President: Aishveryaa Nidhi
- Artistic director: Aishveryaa Nidhi
- Chairman: J Mohan
- Treasurer: Raj Dixit
- Website: www.abhinay.com.au
- Formerly called: Abhinay Theatre

Abhinay School of Performing Arts is a nonprofit charity school based in Sydney, Australia which was founded in 2009 to promote art and culture from the Indian subcontinent in Australia. As of 2013 the school reported having trained over 200 people in dance and theatre arts. Abhinay means "the art of performing" in Sanskrit. Playwright Alex Broun has conducted play-writing workshops with the school for the Indian community, and the school takes part in the yearly Short and Sweet festival he is associated with. The school's president and artistic director is Aishveryaa Nidhi.

Acting workshops focus on dialogue delivery, speech analysis, and body language. Abhinay promotes multiculturalism, and has collaborated with the Hurstville City Council to increase community participation. The school also promotes the Hindi language through instructional classes and live performances.

== Performances ==
The school oversees many theater productions written by Indian and non-Indian writers but specialises in promoting and nurturing Hindi language. Each year, the school holds a festival dedicated to 10-minute plays in Hindi to celebrate Hindi Diwas."Indradhanush – Australian collection of Hindi Plays". The festival was created after a playwriting workshop with Broun at the Shopfront Theatre. The collection features student-written plays, which were later translated to Hindi for the festival. The plays allude to contemporary, social, emotional and political issues. From plays written during the workshop, 'Quarantine' written by Neena Badhawar, directed by Arvind Gaur, starring Aishveryaa Nidhi and Ishwak Singh was Abhinay School's first entry as an Independent Theatre Company for the inaugural New Delhi Short and Sweet (festival) in 2010.

Abhinay was one of the performance groups who collaborated with the Sydney Theatre Company to adapt John Birmingham's 1999 book Leviathan to the stage in 2010.
