= Rashi Bunny =

Indian theatre and cinema actress

- Born: Mumbai, India
- Occupation: Actress
- Years active: 1994–present
- Spouse: Parag Bhargava
- Children: Jaadoo (Samagr Sakshi)
- Awards: Colour of Nation award, International Theatre festival, Nizhnevartovsk, Russia · Ruby Lloyd Artistic & academic Excellence award · Chosen as one of the 50 Icons: emerging personality of India in 2005 by Sahara India Group
- Website: https://rashibunny.in

Rashi Bunny is an Indian theatre and cinema actress. She has performed in Bhisham Sahni's Madhavi, Manjula Padmanabhan's Hidden Fires, and Antoine de Saint-Exupéry's The Little Prince with director Arvind Gaur. Rashi Bunny was selected as "one of the 50 Icons: Emerging personality of India" by the Sahara India group with Rahul Gandhi. Rashi Bunny is also known for the "I have a dream" theatre workshop for self-exploration and creative expression.

She worked with Living Theatre Academy under Ebrahim Alkazi. She is guest faculty member at National Institute of Fashion Technology (NIFT) and has lectured widely in schools, colleges, and institutes of repute in India and abroad. Rashi organized theatre workshops for children in schools and worked with NGOs on social issues.

== Education ==
She completed higher secondary studies at Maharani Gayatri Devi School, Jaipur. She further studied at Sri Venkateshwara College, Delhi University and studied theater at University of Alabama and Rutgers University.

=== Theatre training ===
Rashi did a children's theatre workshop at the National School of Drama. She participated in SNA Theatre Workshop, under Kanhai Lal at National Center for Performing Arts, Mumbai. After her graduation, Rashi pursued her training in Theatre Arts and Design at the University of Alabama and Rutgers University, New Jersey, USA. She is a recipient of a Young Artist Scholarship And Junior Fellowship from department of Culture HRD and Ruby Lloyd Artistic and Academic Excellence award and Best International Student Scholarship Award. She acted as lead character in many plays, such as Beth Henley's Abundance and Jules Feiffer's Feiffer's People and worked with directors like Karma Ibsen, Ward Haarbauer, and Anne Carmichael.

== Theatre in India ==
On her return to India, she worked with Arvind Gaur to explore the new language for solo performances. Rashi acted in many plays with Asmita theatre. She received the Young Artist scholarship and worked under Shyamanand Jalan in Kolkata and was part of many productions, like Vijay Tendulkar's Khamosh! Adaalat Jaari Hai (Shantata! Court Chalu Aahe) and Char Sau Karod Bhullakar. Nabh Taaron Se Khandit Pulkit, translated from an American dark comedy, was her directorial debut at Padatik. Under the MHRD fellowship, she has written a thesis on Padmashri Ratan Thiyam's Theatre based in Manipur.

== Acting ==
- Bhisham Sahni's Madhavi, her first solo, directed by Arvind Gaur won accolades all over India and abroad.
- Manjula Padmanabhan's Hidden Fires was Rashi's other solo directed by Arvind Gaur that has been selected by SKP as one of the best plays of year. It was performed for Queen's award project (UK) for Communal harmony.
- Antoine de Saint-Exupéry's The Little Prince (French: Le Petit Prince), solo by Rashi Bunny directed by Arvind Gaur. It is the only solo performance of The Little Prince in the world.
- Walking Through the Rainbow premiered in Chennai and deals with domestic abuse and other NRI issues.
- Mahesh Dattani's Tara and Final Solutions
- Vijay Mishra's Tatt Niranjana
- Swadesh Deepak's Court Martial and Sabse Udas Kavita
- Munshi Premchand's story Moteram ka Satyagrah adapted by Safdar Hashmi & Habib Tanvir
- Rajesh Kumar's Me Gandhi Bolto
- Street play- Teen Kanastar for Asmita theatre group, New Delhi well praised in World Social Forum

== Design and direction ==
Founding director of Banjara Theatre group at IIT Kharagpur, she has designed and directed many plays such as:

- Dharamvir Bharati's Srishti ka Aakhiri Admi
- Sarveshwar Dayal Saxena's Bakri
- Habib Tanvir's Gadhe
- Manjula Padmanabhan's Hidden Fires

She directed many open-air productions like Daldal, Swaha-Swaha, Bandar Kaun, Girgit, Pahle Aap, Teen Apahij, Deewaren Kuchh Kehna Chahti Hain, and Haathi ki Po(n).

For the Children's Theatre Wing of Banjara, she has written and directed musicals like Veer Abhimani, Aazadi Muft Nahin, TunTun TunTun Tana Bana, Education Gives Real Freedom, Gopi Gayan Bagha Bayen and Beda Dekho Ki.

She conducted theatre workshop and directed the children's play Ujla Tota Sabz Pari, In the universe on a magical spree for Nehru Centre, Mumbai, 2007.

Bunny worked with many schools of repute like with Kena Kamal Becha Malamal adapted from Badal Sircar's Bengali play Hathamaler Paar in Sahayadri School, J Krishnamurty Foundation, and Pune.

== Theatre festivals ==
These plays have been performed for theatre festivals, institutions and NGOs in India and abroad such as Bharat Rang Mahotsav, Muktibodh Natya Utsav, Vivechana National Theatre Festival, Fifth National Balaghat Theatre Festival, Mahindra's Old World Theatre Festival, World Dignity Forum, World Social Forum, Mumbai, The Bash-International Day for Elimination of Violence against Women, Chennai, SATTA-Theatre festival on Power politics, Natrani Festival, Darpana Academy, Ahemdabad, Sahitya Kala Parishad Theatre festival of Best productions of the year, National Solo Theatre Festival, Manch Rangmanch, Punjab Naatshala, Amritsar, Nandikar 23rd National Theatre Festival, Kolkata, Chauraha NCPA, Mumbai, Chaiti, Bhanpura, Performance and Written Word, Sangeet Natak Akademi, Jawahar Kala Kendra Theatre Festival, Jaipur.

International festivals include ARMMONO-2 International One Man show festival, Yerevan, Armenia, The North Meetings, International Theatre festival, Niznevartovsk, Russia, ART’ sce`ne, festival international des arts de la sce`ne, France.

== Theatre teaching ==
Rashi has conducted theatre workshops for engineering and management students at IITs, IIM, colleges in Delhi and Mumbai, and for children, youth and adults from all kinds of background and judged many drama competitions all over India. For India Habitat Centre she has conducted theatre workshops and was the coordinator for the Platform theatre. She was guest faculty at NIFT and has lectured widely in schools, colleges, and institutes of repute in India and abroad. She participated in major theatre seminars and conferences all over world.

== Awards ==
- Chosen as one of the 50 Icons: emerging personality of India in 2005 by Sahara India Group with Rahul Gandhi, Sania Mirza, N Karthikeyan, Kiran Majumdar Shaw, Farah Khan and Abhishek Bachchan.
- Special jury award for experimentation with tradition at International Solo Theatre Festival Armenia for Madhavi play
- "Colour of Nation" award at the International Theatre festival in Nizhnevartovsk Theatre Festival, Russia
- Hidden Fires, best play of year selected by Sahitya Kala Parishad
- Best International Student Scholarship Award, USA
- "Ruby Lloyd Aspey Scholarship" for academic and artistic excellence, UAB Theatre Department, Birmingham
- Outstanding participation certificate for Dance under Talent Search, USA
- President's Honor roll for Academic Excellence, UAB, United States
- Best International Student Award Scholarship, UAB, USA
- Alpha Lambda Delta, National Academic Honor Society, USA
- Dean's Honor list, Livingston College, New Jersey, USA
- Award for Best Director for the Children's play “Kitne Taare, Kitne Bulb” at the National Science Drama Competition, Birla Industrial And Technological Museum, East Zonals

== Critics' remarks ==
- It was a delightful solo performance by Rashi Bunny, as she brought to fore a range of human emotions in Bhisham Sahni's MADHAVI... it is an experiment both in its presentation by the director Arvind Gaur and its enactment by the actor Rashi. The set and its use to my mind is indeed creative bordering on the genius. -The Hindu
- The play was among the very rare meaningful theatre we get to watch in our city. Thought provoking, overwhelming, it left so many fighting their tears. Each person present would have identified with the double standards of our society, each person sitting there would have felt guilty of having reduced the existence of a woman to a mere object, a commodity. Each woman would have relived some part of her life. -Hindustan Times
- All women will be able to see a part of themselves in it. The relevance of the issue makes the time setting immaterial. Even though the play is based on mythology, Madhavi. It was a delightful solo performance by Rashi Bunny, as is contemporary in its presentation and style... -India Today
- It's 'an actor's play'... The Kathavachan style has been adopted and the actor Rashi relates to the audience in day to day baat cheet...an intense and intimate theatre experience. -The Pioneer
- The solo performance is an experiment. It's like taking people through a journey. Even the set design is very experimental. There are blank canvasses on the stage and different colours placed in earthen pots, that symbolize the different colours of life. -First City
- The complex story of Madhavi, her trauma, tragedy, and conflicts were portrayed with great sensitivity by Rashi Bunny. The simplicity of set design, use of bamboo structures, canvasses & helped audiences to extend their imagination to grasp the diversity and multi dimensional directorial interpretation of the play. -Navbharat Times

== Cinema ==
- Duvidha (Hindi) The cast includes Manoj Verma and Rashi Bunny; the director was Sharat Kumar.

== Personal ==
Rashi Bunny's mother is an alumnus of National School of Drama. Rashi's husband Dr. Parag Bhargava is a professor at IIT Bombay.

== Also read ==
Rang Prasang, National School of Drama's Theatre Magazine, July–August, 2007, page 30 'Vidusi Abhinatri' Rashi Bunny' by Jaidev Taneja (prominent drama critic)
