= Bhisham Sahni =

Indian playwright and actor (1915–2003)

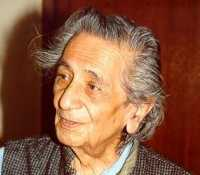
- Sahni in 1985
- Born: 8 August 1915; Rawalpindi, Punjab, British India (present-day Punjab, Pakistan)
- Died: 11 July 2003 (aged 87); Delhi, India
- Occupations: Writer; playwright; actor
- Relatives: Balraj Sahni (brother); Parikshit Sahni (nephew); Anand–Sahni family
- Writing career
- Period: 1955–2003
- Political party: Communist Party of India

Bhisham Sahni (8 August 1915 – 11 July 2003) was an Indian writer, playwright in Hindi and an actor, most famous for his novel Tamas ("Darkness"/'Ignorance") and the television screenplay adaptation of the same name, a powerful and passionate account of the partition of India. He was awarded the Padma Bhushan for literature in 1998, and Sahitya Akademi Fellowship in 2002. He was the younger brother of the noted Hindi film actor, Balraj Sahni.

== Biography ==
Bhisham Sahni was born on 8 August 1915 in Rawalpindi, in undivided Punjab. He earned a master's degree in English literature from Government College in Lahore, and a Ph.D. from Punjab University, Chandigarh in 1958.

He joined the struggle for Indian independence. At the time of partition, he was an active member of the Indian National Congress and organized relief work for the refugees when riots broke out in Rawalpindi in March 1947. In 1948 Bhisham Sahni started working with the Indian People’s Theatre Association (IPTA), an organization with which his brother, Balraj Sahni was already closely associated. He worked both as an actor and a director. At a later stage, he directed a drama Bhoot Gari. This was adapted for the stage by film director, screenwriter, novelist, and journalist Khwaja Ahmed Abbas. As an actor, he appeared in several films, including Saeed Mirza's Mohan Joshi Hazir Ho! (1984), Tamas (1988), Kumar Shahani's Kasba (1991), Bernardo Bertolucci's Little Buddha (1993), and Aparna Sen's Mr. and Mrs. Iyer (2002).

As a result of his association with IPTA, he left the Congress and joined the Communist Party of India. Thereafter, he left Bombay for Punjab where he worked briefly as a lecturer, first in a college at Ambala and then at Khalsa College, Amritsar. At this time he was involved in organizing the Punjab College Teachers’ Union and also continued with IPTA work. In 1952 he moved to Delhi and was appointed Lecturer in English at Delhi College (now Zakir Husain College), University of Delhi.

From 1956 to 1963 he worked as a translator at the Foreign Languages Publishing House in Moscow, and translated some important works into Hindi, including Lev Tolstoy’s short stories and his novel Resurrection. On his return to India, Bhisham Sahni resumed teaching at Delhi College, and also edited the reputed literary magazine Nai Kahaniyan from 1965 to 1967. He retired from service in 1980. Sahni was fluent in Punjabi, English, Urdu, Sanskrit, and Hindi.

Bhisham Sahni was associated with several literary and cultural organizations. He was General Secretary of the All India Progressive Writers Association (1975–85) and Acting General Secretary of the Afro-Asian Writer’ Association and was also associated with the editing of their journal Lotus. He was the founder and chairman of SAHMAT, an organization promoting cross-cultural understanding, founded in memory of the murdered theatre artist and activist Safdar Hashmi.

== Literary works ==
Bhisham Sahni's epic work Tamas (Darkness/Ignorance 1974) is a novel based on the riots of 1947 partition of India which he witnessed at Rawalpindi. Tamas portrays the horrors of senseless communal politics of violence and hatred; and the tragic aftermath – death, destruction, forced migration and the partition of a country. It has been translated to English, French, German, Japanese and many Indian languages including Tamil, Gujarati, Malayalam, Kashmiri, Marathi and Manipuri. Tamas won the 1975 Sahitya Akademi Award for literature and was later made into a television film in 1987 by Govind Nihalani. Two of his masterpiece stories, "Pali" and "Amritsar Aa Gaya Hai", are also based on the partition.

Sahni's prolific career as a writer also included six other Hindi novels: Jharokhe (1967), Kadian (1971), Basanti (1979), Mayyadas Ki Madi (1987), Kunto (1993) and Neeloo, Nilima, Nilofar (2000)., over hundred short stories spread over ten collections of short stories, including Bhagya Rekha (1953), Pahla Patha (1956), Bhatakti Raakh (1966), Patrian (1973), Wang Chu (1978), Shobha Yatra (1981), Nishachar (1983), Pali (1989), and Daayan (1996); five plays including Hanoosh, Kabira Khada Bazar Mein, Madhavi, Muavze, Alamgeer, a collection of children's short stories Gulal Ka Keel. But his novel named Mayyadas Ki Mari (Mayyadas's Castle) was one of his finest literary creations, the backdrop of this narrative is historical and depicts the age when the Khalsa Raj was vanquished in Punjab and the British were taking over. This novel is a saga of changing social order and decadent set of values. He wrote the screenplay for Kumar Shahani's film, Kasba (1991), which is based on Anton Chekhov's story "In the Gully". Although Sahni had been writing stories for a long time, he received recognition as a story writer only after the publication of his story "Chief Ki Daawat" (The Chief’s Party) in the Kahani magazine in 1956.

Bhisham Sahni wrote his autobiography Aaj Ke Ateet (Today's Pasts, Penguin 2016) and the biography of his brother Balraj Sahni, Balraj My Brother (English).

=== Plays ===
- Hanoosh (1977), staged by theatre director Rajindra Nath and Arvind Gaur (1993). it was adapted into Kashmiri as Waqtsaaz by Manzoor Ahmad Mir and was performed by the artists participating in month-long Educational Theatre workshop organized by National School of Drama at Srinagar under the direction of M. K. Raina in the year 2004.
- Kabira Khada Bazar Mein (1981): Many Indian theatre directors like M. K. Raina, Arvind Gaur and Abhijeet Choudhary have performed this play.
- Madhavi (1982): First staged by theatre director Rajindra Nath. Later US-trained actress Rashi Bunny performed Madhavi as a solo play. This solo won many awards in international theatre festivals.
- Muavze (1993): First performed by National School of Drama with Bapi Bose. This is a very popular play among theatre groups; Swatantra Theatre, Pune also performed it various times and received the best play and best actor awards at the Maharashtra state competition awards in 2018.

=== Literary style ===
Bhisham Sahni was one of the most prolific writers of Hindi literature. Krishan Baldev Vaid said, "His voice, both as a writer and a man, was serene and pure and resonant with humane reassurances. His immense popularity was not a result of any pandering to vulgar tastes but a reward for his literary merits—his sharp wit, his gentle irony, his all-pervasive humor, his penetrating insight into character, his mastery as a raconteur, and his profound grasp of the yearnings of the human heart."

Writer Nirmal Verma stated, "If we see a long gallery of unmatched characters in his stories and novels, where each person is present with his class and family; pleasures and pains of his town and district; the whole world of perversions and contradictions; it is because the reservoir of his (Bhisham Sahni's) experience was vast and abundant. At the request of his father – would anyone believe? – he dabbled in business, in which he was a miserable failure. With his high-spirits and passion for life of the common people, he traveled through villages and towns of Punjab with the IPTA theatre group; then began to teach to earn a living; and then lived in the USSR for seven years as a Hindi translator. This sprawling reservoir of experience collected in the hustle-bustle of various occupations ultimately filtered down into his stories and novels, without which, as we realize today, the world of Hindi prose would have been deprived and desolate. The simplicity of his work comes from hard layers of experience, which distinguish and separate it from other works of simplified realism. ... Bhisham Sahni is able to express the terrifying tragedy of Partition with an extraordinary compassion in his stories. "Amritsar Aa Gaya Hai" (We have reached Amritsar) is one such exceptional work where Bhisham gets away from the external reality and points to the bloody fissures etched on people's psyche. This is possible only for a writer who, in the darkness of historic events has seen the sudden 'accidents' that happen inside human hearts from up close. ... After reading his last collection of stories Daayan (Witch), I was amazed that even after so many years there seemed no repetition or staleness in his writing. Each of his stories seemed to bring something sudden from newer directions, which was as new for him as it was unexpected for us. That Bhisham never paused, never halted in such a long creative journey is a big achievement; but what is bigger perhaps is that his life nurtured his work and his work nurtured his life, both nurtured each other continuously."

== Awards and honours ==
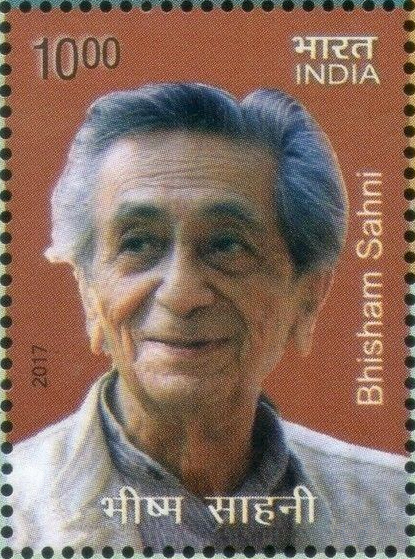
Sahni on a 2017 stamp of India

During his lifetime, Bhisham Sahni won several awards including Shiromani Writers Award,1979, Uttar Pradesh Government Award for Tamas, 1975, Colour of Nation Award at International Theatre Festival, Russia for the play Madhavi (performed by Rashi Bunny), 2004, Madhya Pradesh Kala Sahitya Parishad Award, for his play Hanush, 1975 the Lotus Award from the Afro-Asian Writers' Association, 1981 and the Soviet Land Nehru Award, 1983, and finally the Padma Bhushan for literature in 1998, Shalaka Samman, New Delhi 1999–2000, Maithlisharan Gupta Samman, Madhya Pradesh, 2000–2001, Sangeet Natak Academy Award 2001, Sir Syed National Award for best Hindi Fiction Writer 2002, and India's highest literary award the Sahitya Akademi Fellowship in 2002.

On 31 May 2017, India Post released a commemorative postage stamp to honour Sahni.
