= Desire Under the Elms (opera) =

1978 opera by Edward Thomas

Desire Under the Elms, subtitled "An American Folk Opera in Three Acts", is an opera by Edward Thomas (b. 1924) which premiered in Connecticut in 1978. It is based on Eugene O'Neill's drama Desire Under the Elms, itself based on Hippolytus by Euripides.

== Recordings ==
Thomas : Desire Under the Elms Jerry Hadley, James Morris, Victoria Livengood, Mel Ulrich, Jeffrey Lentz, Darth Meadows. London Symphony Orchestra, George Manahan 2003 Naxos
