= Arvind Gaur =

Indian theatre director

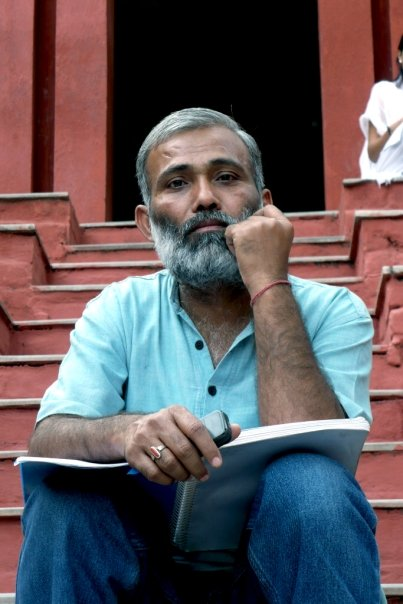

Arvind Gaur is an Indian theatre director, actor trainer, social activist, street theatre worker and story teller. He is known for socially and politically relevant plays in India. Gaur's plays are contemporary and thought-provoking, connecting intimate personal spheres of existence to larger social political issues. His work deals with Internet censorship, communalism, caste issues, feudalism, domestic violence, crimes of state, politics of power, violence, injustice, social discrimination, marginalisation, and racism. Arvind is the founder of Asmita, which is a theatre group in Delhi.

Gaur was the recipient of a research fellowship awarded by the Ministry of Human Resource Development (India) (1997–98). He was on the guest faculty of Delhi University for Theatre in education program for three years. He has conducted many theatre workshops and performed in colleges, institutions, universities and schools in India and abroad.

He organizes theatre workshops for children in schools and slums as well as street theatre performances on socio-political issues. He has directed more than hundreds stage and street plays over 25 years.

== Personal life ==
He was born on 2 February 1963 in Delhi. Arvind's father Late. Shri Shiva Nandan Sharma was a Mathematics scholar and his mother Late. Saraswati Devi was a housewife. His father died on 16 April 2009 and his mother died on 19 September 2019. He has one brother Anil Gaur and three sisters: Shashi Prabha, late Mithlesh and Anita Gaur. He is married to Dr. Sangeeta Gaur. He has twins daughters Kakoli Gaur Nagpal and Saveree Gaur. Prince Nagpal married his daughter Kakoli Gaur.

== Theatre career ==
After completing his schooling from Model School, Delhi, he decided to study engineering in Electronic Communication. He later joined the Delhi Public Library drama group where he acted in and directed plays. Then he worked with slum kids and industrial labourers for some time and conducted workshops for them. His first street play was with Zakir Hussein College, called Videshi Aya. It became very popular and he staged it around 200 schools. After this, his desire to express led him to journalism. He worked with the Navbharat Times newspaper as culture columnist for about four years.

Gaur worked for Press Trust of India (PTI-TV) where he was incharge of research and programming. He was associated with TV serial Tana-Bana. All through his years with street theatre, print and television, Gaur had developed keen interest in direction. Finally, after devoting two years to PTI-TV, he felt the urge to switch to theatre completely.

Arvind's debut play was Bhisham Sahni's Hanoosh (February, 1993). He started his theatre journey with plays like Tughlaq, Andha Yug, Caligula, Julius Caesar, etc.

He performed Girish Karnad's Tughlaq in a small basement theatre (SRC). Tughlaq was selected as "the best play of the year 1994" by Sahitya Kala Parishad.

== Major directions ==
- Girish Karnad's Tughlaq translations by B. V. Karanth, Surekha Sikri & K.K. Nayyar
- Bhisham Sahni's Hanoosh
- Dharamvir Bharati's Andha Yug (The Age of Blindness)
- Swadesh Deepak's Court Martial (450 shows)
- Govind Deshpande's Antim Divas, translated in Hindi by Chandra kant patil
- Albert Camus's Caligula (play), translation by Sharad Chandra
- Girish Karnad's Rakt Kalyan (Taledanda), Hindi Translation by Ram Gopal Bajaj
- Bertolt Brecht's The Caucasian Chalk Circle translated by Kamleshwar
- Mahesh Dattani's Final Solutions, translation by Shahid Anwar
- Eugene O'Neill's Desire Under the Elms translated by Nadira Babbar
- Dario Fo's Operation Three Star, adaptation of Accidental Death of an Anarchist by Amitabh Srivatava
- Dr. Narendra Mohan's Kalandar & Mr.Jinnah
- Samuel Beckett's Waiting For Godot, translation Krishna Bal Dev Vaid
- John Octanasek's Romeo Juliet and the darkness, script by Aishveryaa Nidhi
- Neil Simon's The Good Doctor, Adaptation - Sunil Jasuja, Sadia & Aparna Singh
- Vijay Tendulkar's Ghashiram Kotwal
- Sharad Joshi's Andhon ka Hathi & Ek tha Gadha urf aladat Khan
- Munshi Premchand's Mote ram ka Satyagrah, Adaptation by Habib Tanvir and Safdar Hashmi
- Ashok Lal's Ek Mamooli Aadmi
- Nag Bodas's Amma Tujhe salaam
- Rajesh Kumar's Me Gandhi Bolto
- William Shakespeare's Julius Caesar
- Mahesh Dattani's Tara, translation by Neeraj Mallik
- Vijay Mishra's Tatt Niranjana, translation by Rajendra Prasad Mishra
- Doodnath Singh's Yama Gatha
- Uday Prakash's Warren Hastings ka Saand
- Dr. Harish Naval's Peeli Chht par Kaala Nissan
- Bhisham Sahni's Kabira (Kabir) kheda Bazar Mai
- Mahesh Dattani's 30 Days in September, Hindi translation by Smita Nirula
- Bharatendu Harishchandra's Andher Nagri
- Harsh Mander's Unsuni, script by Mallika Sarabhai
- Rajesh Kumar's Ambedkar Aur Gandhi Nominated for the best play, best direction and best ensemble in the Mahindra Excellence in Theatre Awards-2011
- Mohan Rakesh's Leheron Ke Raj Hans
- Bertolt Brecht's The Good Person of Szechwan 'Ramkali', adaptation by Amitabh Srivastava, starring Mallika Sarabhai and Revanta Sarabhai (34th Vikram Sarabhai International Art Festival)
- Gulzar's Kharaashein, play based on his poetries and stories
- Govind Purushottam Deshpande's Raastey. Hindi translation by Jyoti Subhash
- Mahesh Bhatt's The Last Salute, written by Rajesh Kumar.Play based on Muntadhar al-Zaidi's Book.
- Partition play based on Saadat Hasan Manto's stories
- Dario Fo's 'Chukayenge Nahi' Can't Pay? Won't Pay!, Hindi adaptation by Amitabh Srivastava
- Rajesh Kumar's play 'Trial of Errors'

=== Solo play direction ===
- Bhisham Sahni's Madhavi solo play with Rashi Bunny
- Untitled, solo with Lushin Dubey (Theatre World)
- Manjula Padmanabhan's Hidden Fires, with Rashi Bunny
- Gandhari ... in search of light, solo with Aishveryaa Nidhi
- Sarah Kane's 4.48 Psychosis by Ruth Sheard
- Women in Black, one-woman show written & acted by Bubbles Sabharwal
- Antoine de Saint-Exupéry's The Little Prince, one-woman show by Rashi Bunny
- Pinki Virani's Bitter Chocolate solo by Lushin Dubey
- Walking through the Rainbow, with Rashi Bunny
- Story of the Tiger, with Jaimini Kumar Srivastava
- A Woman Alone, solo with Ruth Sheard in English.
- 'I Will Not Cry', solo with Lushin Dubey
- Aruna's Story solo play with Lushin Dubey based on Pinki Virani's book on Nurse Aruna Shanbaug case

=== Street plays ===
Gaur directed more than 40 street theatre performances on socio-political issues. He has raised voice against socio-political issues that effect the common public. He directed street plays like Corruption, Garbage, Road Rage, and Dastak which is against the issue of eve teasing. His street plays are have been considered thought-provoking. He and his team performs socio-political street plays all across Delhi/NCR and the country. He is regarded as a man with a message who believes that change can start from society, if we wish to start the change.

== Awards ==
Gaur won the Special Honour Award by Delhi International Film festival 2015

== Films/visual media ==
- Acted in Raanjhanaa as Guptaji directed by Aanand L. Rai
- Acted in JD film directed by Shailendra Pandey with Govind Namdev, Aman Verma, Vedita Pratap Singh
- acted in Gurgaon
- acted in Emergency
- Acted in short film "Meri Jeevan ki Abhilasha" directed by Kriti Takkar which won second best fiction film in "Mise-en-Scene", the international student's film festival, 2010.
- Assistant director, docu-film "In search of an ideology", director Prasanna for Doordarshan, Ministry of Information and Broadcasting (India).
- Worked with Press Trust of India (PTI-TV).
- Acted in tele-film Dhabba directed by Green Oscar awardee Mike Pandey, produced by Nafisa Ali.
- Assistant director, docu-film Gokak (V. K. Gokak), director Prasanna for Sahitya Akademi, Delhi.
- Research and scripting for TV serial Taana-Bana (1991–1992), produced by Press Trust of India.

== Translation and Scripting ==
=== Translation ===
He translated Rabindranath Tagore's Visarjan (Sacrifice), which is performed by the Darpana Theatre Group and directed by Ujjwal Dave. Gaur translated Unsuni in Hindi; script and direction by Mallika Sarabhai.

=== Scripts ===
He scripted plays like Untitled, Gandhari...in search of light, I will not Cry, Bitter Chocolate (based on Pinki Virani's book), Madhavi solo play (based on Bhisham Sahni's play) and many street plays for Asmita Theatre.

=== Design ===
Arvind Gaur designs lights for Naya Theatre group's major productions under the direction of Habib Tanvir. Gaur also assisted Habib Tanvir during the Prithvi Theatre Festival. He designs lights for Agra Bazar Nazeer Akbarabadi 's poetry), Charandas Chor (his masterpiece play, Edinburgh Fringe Award), Asghar Wajahat's Jis Lahore Nai Dekhya, Kamdeo ka Apna Basant Ritu ka Sapna (Habib Tanvir's adaptation of Shakespeare's A Midsummer Night's Dream), Canadian-Indian playwright Rahul Varma's Zahreeli Hawa and Gaon ke naon Sasural, mor naon Damand.

=== Major Actors ===
Major cinema and theatre actors who trained under Arvind Gaur are Kangana Ranaut, Deepak Dobriyal, Manu Rishi, Shilpa Shukla, Rashi Bunny, Aishveryaa Nidhi, Tillotama Shome, Imran Zahid, Sheena Chohan, Seema Azmi, Ishwak Singh and Suraj Singh of Veere Di Wedding fame. Sonam Kapoor attended Gaur's acting workshop to learn the nuances of street theatre for her film Raanjhanaa. Other prominent theatre actors who worked with him are Mallika Sarabhai, Piyush Mishra, Lushin Dubey, Bubbles Sabharwal, Ruth Sheard, Jaimini Kumar, etc.
