= Desire Under the Elms =

1924 play written by Eugene O'Neill

- Original language: English
- Written by: Eugene O'Neill
- Genre: Tragedy

Premiere
- Date: November 11, 1924
- Place: Provincetown Playhouse; New York City, New York, United States

Desire Under the Elms is a 1924 play written by Eugene O'Neill. Like Mourning Becomes Electra, Desire Under the Elms signifies an attempt by O'Neill to adapt plot elements and themes of Greek tragedy to a rural New England setting. It was inspired by the myth of Phaedra, Hippolytus, and Theseus. A film version was produced in 1958, and there is an operatic setting by Edward Thomas.

== Characters ==
The following descriptions are taken from the text of the play.

- Eben Cabot – He is twenty-five, tall and sinewy. His face is well-formed, good-looking, but its expression is resentful and defensive. His defiant, dark eyes remind one of a wild animal's in captivity. Each day is a cage in which he finds himself trapped but inwardly unsubdued. There is a fierce, repressed vitality about him. He has black hair, moustache, a thin, curly trace of beard. He is dressed in rough farm clothes.
- Simeon Cabot and Peter Cabot – [They are] tall men, much older than their half-brother [Simeon is thirty-nine and Peter thirty-seven], built on a squarer, simpler model, fleshier in body, more bovine and homelier in face, shrewder and more practical. Their shoulders stoop a bit from years of farm work. They clump heavily along in their clumsy thick-soled boots caked with earth. Their clothes, their faces, hands, bare arms and throats are earth-stained. They smell of dirt.
- Ephraim Cabot – [He] is seventy-five, tall and gaunt, with great, wiry, concentrated power, but stoop-shouldered from toil. His face is as hard as if it were hewn out of a boulder, yet there is a weakness in it, a petty pride in its own narrow strength. His eyes are small, close together, and extremely near-sighted, blinking continually in the effort to focus on objects, their stare having a straining, ingrowing quality. He is dressed in his dismal black Sunday suit.
- Abbie Putnam – [She] is thirty-five, buxom, full of vitality. Her round face is pretty but marred by its rather gross sensuality. There are strength and obstinacy in her jaw, a hard determination in her eyes, and about her whole personality, the same unsettled, untamed, desperate quality so apparent in Eben.
- Young Girl
- Two Farmers
- The Fiddler
- A Sheriff

== Synopsis ==
Act 1, Scene 1

The play opens at the exterior of a farmhouse in New England. It is sunset on an early summer day in 1850. Eben Cabot enters and walks to the edge of the porch. He rings a bell to call in his half-brothers, Simeon and Peter, who emerge soon after Eben goes back inside. The two brothers begin to talk about gold in the west and the risk of leaving everything they have worked for here. Eben sticks his head out the window as the two brothers speculate over their father's disappearance to the west, saying that he hasn't left the farm in 30 years or more. They decide they can't go west until their father dies. Eben reveals himself then by saying he prays his father were dead. With one last look at the setting sun and the promise of the west, the brothers retreat inside for supper.

Act 1, Scene 2

This scene opens at twilight in the kitchen of the farmhouse. As the three brothers eat dinner, Simeon and Peter reprimand Eben for speaking ill of their father. Eben then unloads his hate for his father because Eben blames him for his mother's death. He denounces his father saying he is his mother through and through. Eben also reveals his grudge against his half-brothers for not helping or protecting his mother. He then leaves to visit Min, his local prostitute. As Eben leaves, his brothers remark on how like his father he is.

Act 1, Scene 3

Eben comes home late and wakes his brothers. He informs them that their father has remarried a 35-year-old woman and is on his way home. When Simeon and Peter realise the farm will go to her, they decide to go west. Eben desperately wants the farm because it belonged to his mother and he wishes to honor her memory. He offers to buy his brother's shares of the farm for $300 each. They tell him they will think about it, waiting to decide until they see their father's new wife and can see the money in person. However, as soon as Eben leaves the room, they decide to stop working the farm.

Act 1, Scene 4

The brothers reveal to Eben they won't be working on the farm anymore, so Eben goes to milk the cows while Peter and Simeon get drunk. Eben returns to the house after seeing his father and his new wife on the horizon. Peter and Simeon decide to leave the farm and sign the papers for Eben. They walk outside; taunt their father, Ephraim, and his new wife, Abbie; and then leave for California. Abbie begins to explore the house and runs into Eben. They are attracted to one another but fight over the future possession of the farm. The scene closes with harsh words between Ephraim and Eben.

Act 2, Scene 1

This scene takes place outside the farmhouse two months later. Abbie catches Eben on the way to visit Min, his choice prostitute. She tries to seduce him, but he has only a mind for owning the farm and leaves her. Ephraim enters and is transformed. He is now gentle and is coming around to the idea of Eben owning the farm. Abbie gets upset at possibly losing the farm to Eben and claims he was lusting after her. Ephraim wants to throw Eben off the farm, but Abbie convinces him that Eben is needed to do the farm work. She then suggests they have a son, and Ephraim promises to give her the farm if she does.

Act 2, Scene 2

Ephraim and Abbie sit in their bedroom talking about having a son. Ephraim tells the story of how he made the farm when he was only 20 years old and the terrible loneliness he has experienced with his wives. Abbie has no interest in his story, and he leaves. Abbie then goes to Eben's room and kisses him. He kisses her, but then, confused, pushes her away. However, caught in her power, he agrees to court her in the parlor that has been closed since his mother's death.

Act 2, Scene 3

Eben meets Abbie in the parlor where Eben talks about his mother, beginning to cry. Abbie comforts him, saying that she could be a new mom to him and asks him to kiss her. Eventually Eben gives in and admits he loves her and has since the first hour he met her.

Act 2, Scene 4

Abbie bids Eben goodbye as he heads for work. She makes him re-swear his love and then goes to get some sleep. Eben runs into his father and asks for their feud to be over. He believes his mother's soul is now at rest because he has taken revenge on his father and goes off to work laughing.

Act 3, Scene 1

Ephraim throws a party for the birth of what he considers his new son. Abbie sits in a chair, pale and unmoving. She keeps asking where Eben is. The party guests keep hinting that they know the son is Eben's but neither Abbie nor Ephraim catch on. Abbie goes upstairs and finds Eben, they kiss, and she says the baby looks just like him. Ephraim goes outside for air, and with a feeling that something's not at rest, goes to sleep with the cows.

Act 3, Scene 2

Ephraim runs into Eben later that night and tells him he will not have the farm now that Ephraim has a son. Eben becomes convinced that Abbie has been using him and confronts her about it once Ephraim goes inside and Abbie comes out. He says that he is going to leave, that he doesn't love her, and that she is a lying whore. Hysterical, she asks that if there is any way to prove that she didn't have a son with him to steal the land from him, would he ever love her again? He says yes, but that she isn't God, so there is no way. She promises that there is and Eben goes inside to get drunk.

Act 3, Scene 3

It is the morning after the party and Eben sits in the kitchen with his bag packed. Abbie comes downstairs and tells him what she has done to prove she loves him and wasn't lying. She has killed their son. Enraged, Eben condemns her and runs out to get a sheriff to take her away. Abbie faints.

Act 3, Scene 4

Ephraim wakes up, and Abbie tells him she has murdered the baby and that it wasn't his. He becomes detached and says he is going out to work. Before he leaves, Ephraim says she should have loved him and he would have protected her no matter what. Eben comes back and professes that he still loves her but that he told the sheriff. He demands to take some fault for murder. Abbie doesn't want him to, but he blurts it out the moment the sheriff arrives. The two get taken away together.

== Influences ==
Desire Under the Elms was inspired by plot elements and characters from the Euripides play Hippolytus. In it, Phaedra, Theseus' wife, attempts to seduce his son, chaste Hippolytus. After this fails and Hippolytus threatens to reveal her unfaithfulness, Phaedra commits suicide. Theseus finds a letter that Phaedra carried accusing Hippolytus of raping her. Enraged, Theseus (using one of three wishes that his father Poseidon promised him) curses his son with banishment or death. After Hippolytus is fatally wounded by an encounter with a bull, Artemis arrives to reveal the truth to Theseus, and Hippolytus dies after absolving his father.

The characters Eben, Abbie, and Ephraim roughly correspond with Hippolytus, Phaedra, and Theseus respectively. Both plays are driven by a love triangle between a father, a son, and a stepmother, and the tragedy arises from misguided actions made by the stepmother. In Phaedra's case it is her lust of her husband's son and the falseness of her letter. O'Neill takes this one step further in Desire Under the Elms and makes Abbie's misguided actions the begetting and murder of her child.

In Desire Under the Elms: In the Light of Strindberg's Influence, Murray Hartman also saw strong parallels between Desire Under the Elms and the work of August Strindberg, writing "At any rate, there is hardly a plot element in the play that cannot be traced to one or more sources in Strindberg." He details several elements of O'Neill and Strindberg's biographies that are similar, and how they manifest in Desire Under the Elms, in addition to naming several specific works of Strindberg's, such as The People of Hemsö, The Bridal Crown, and The Son of a Servant. Specifically, he points out very similarly confused relationships with the writers' respective mothers and contentious relationships with their fathers. He also writes, "The basic situation, where the young son has seen his beloved mother worked to death by a hard father and then has had to bear the usurpation of her position by an aggressive stepmother, has its origin in The Son of a Servant." This can be seen in Desire under the Elms through Eben's opinion that Ephraim worked his mother to death and largely drives the plot.

== Production history ==
Provincetown Players (off-Broadway, 1924) – Starring Walter Huston as Ephraim Cabot, Mary Morris as Abbie Putnam and Charles Ellis as Eben Cabot. After two months at the Greenwich Village Theatre, this production transferred to Broadway and played an additional nine months, first at the Earl Carroll Theatre, then at George M. Cohan's Theatre and finally at Daly's 63rd Street Theatre, for a total of 420 performances.

Broadway (1952) – Directed by Harold Clurman, produced by The American National Theater and Academy. Starring Karl Malden as Ephraim Cabot, Douglass Watson as Eben Cabot and Carol Stone as Abbie Putnam, 46 performances.

Academy Festival Theatre (Lake Forest, Illinois, 1974) – Directed by Vinette Carrol, produced by William T. Gardner. Starring Roscoe Lee Browne as Ephraim Cabot, Glynn Turman as Eben Cabot and Cicely Tyson as Abbie Putnam.

Asmita Theatre (India, 1995) – Directed by Arvind Gaur, translated by Nadira Babbar, starring Deepak Dobriyal, Manu Rishi, Deepak Ochani and Arachana Shintre Joshii, 14 performances.

Goodman Theatre (Chicago, 2009) – Directed by Robert Falls, starring Brian Dennehy as Ephraim Cabot, Carla Gugino as Anna Putnam and Pablo Schreiber as Eben Cabot.

Sri Ram Centre Theatre (Mandi House, New Delhi, India, 2010) – A RAS production. Directed by Deepak Ochaney and Gajraj Nagar, starring Mukul Saran Mathur as Ephraim Cabot, Sanjeela Mathur as Anna Putnam, six performances.

Broadway (2009) – Transfer of the Goodman production; opened April 27, 2009 at the St. James Theater, 32 performances.

New Vic Theatre (Newcastle-under-Lyme, Staffordshire, UK, 2010) – Directed by James Dacre, starring Gareth Thomas as Ephraim Cabot, Victoria Lloyd as Anna Putnam, Cary Crankson as Eben Cabot, Owen Oakeshott as Peter Cabot and Timothy Chipping as Simeon Cabot.

Lyric Hammersmith (2012) – Directed by Sean Holmes and designed by Ian MacNeil, starring Morgan Watkins as Eben Cabot, Denise Gough as Anna Putnam and Finbar Lynch as Ephraim Cabot.

This play was adapted by Balwant Gargi (under the name "Balde Tibbe") in Punjabi for the Department of Drama and Dramatics at Jahangirnagar University, Dhaka, Bangladesh, as the second-year final production of 2015. It was held on 26 November 2016 and directed by Reza Arif.

Shaw Festival (2021) - Desire Under the Elms was initially scheduled as a part of the festival's 2020 season, but the season was eventually cancelled due to the COVID-19 pandemic, and the production was moved to the fall of the 2021 season. Directed by Tim Carroll, set by Judith Bowden, lighting by Kevin Lamotte, and costumes by Joyce Padua.

Almeida Theatre, (2026) - Directed by Ebenezer Bamgboye and starring Zackary Momoh.
