= Tara: A Play in Two Acts =

1995 play by Mahesh Dattani

- Author: Mahesh Dattani
- Original title: Tara
- Language: English
- Genre: Gender Discrimination
- Publisher: Orient Blackswan, Ravi Dayal Publishers
- Publication date: 1995
- Publication place: India
- Pages: 61
- ISBN: 978-8-175-30003-3

Tara: A Play in Two Acts is an English play written by Mahesh Dattani. It is the story of Tara, a girl who faced discrimination due to her gender. It was written in 1990 and published in 1995 by Orient Blackswan. It focuses on gender discrimination, sexual marginalisation, familial discord, and communalism.

== Characters ==
- Tara, twin of Chandan
- Chandan (Dan), twin of Tara
- Roopa, new friend to Tara and Chandan
- Dr. Thakkar - Doctor who performed the operation
- Mrs Bharti - Tara's mother
- Mr Patel - Tara's father

== Plot ==
The play opens with Chandan, who is now known as Dan, frantically drafting "Twinke Tara: a Play in Two Acts," a play about his sister Tara, who has long since died, at his London bedsitter. He talks about his memories, his obsessive desire to write them down to honor his twin sister, and how he struggles to come up with writing material. As he talks, a flashback of young Tara and Chandan entering the Patel home appears. They talk about how they were meant to be together from infancy and were compelled to part ways. Their mother, Bharati, arrives and asks Tara and Chandan to unpack since they have moved from Bangalore to Mumbai in order to receive medical attention. Because she is concerned for Tara's health, she expresses a clear preference for her. When she suggests that Patel dislikes everything to do with their Bangalore home and their maternal grandpa and is fonder of Chandan than Tara, he gives up trying to reason with her. While Bharati manipulates Tara into following her orders, Patel tries to bring Chandan to work with him, but Chandan won't go unless Tara does. With a hidden agenda, their fifteen-year-old neighbor Roopa visits them in order to tell her friends about Tara, whom she views as abnormal. She interrupts the twins as they are playing cards and arguing. While the kids play in the alleyway, Patel can be seen conversing with an unseen neighbor and expressing concern for his wife's wellbeing. Tara asserts that because her mother has given her strength, she is capable of facing life head-on.
