= Short+Sweet =

Australian theatre festival

- Genre: Theatre festival
- Frequency: Yearly per each festival.
- Locations: Australia, Asia, Middle East, US, Ireland
- Years active: 2002–present
- Inaugurated: 2002, Sydney, Australia
- Website: www.shortandsweet.org

Short+Sweet is a multi-form arts platform presenting festivals in theatre, dance, music-theatre, comedy and cabaret co-ordinated in multiple counties globally. The unifying feature of all works presented at the festival is they must be no longer than ten-minutes. Their flagship festival is Short+Sweet Theatre Sydney, the largest ten-minute play festival in the world.

== Festivals ==
Short+Sweet Theatre was founded at the Newtown Theatre (now King Street Theatre) in Sydney in January 2002 by Mark Cleary, beginning with the first ever Short+Sweet Theatre festival.

In January 2004, Alex Broun took over as artistic coordinator of Short+Sweet Theatre, Sydney. New elements were introduced during this time, including a strict time-limit, limit of one play per playwright, one play per director and two plays per actor, people's choice voting and the competitive aspect of the festival where plays are chosen from each week to progress to the Gala Final.

Short+Sweet Theatre Sydney is now the largest ten-minute theatre festival in the world, with around 180 new plays being produced every season. Festivals are held in Sydney, Melbourne, Brisbane, Gold Coast, Newcastle, Canberra, Hobart, Rockhampton and Townsville in Australia, as well as Hollywood in the USA, Singapore, Malaysia, Philippines, India, Dubai and New Zealand with plans to expand to China, UK and Saudi Arabia. Short+Sweet Theatre currently receives around 1500 script entries from writers across the world annually.

Short+Sweet Dubai was launched by Australian playwright and director Alex Broun in 2013 at the Dubai Community Theatre and Arts Centre (DUCTAC). He also served as festival director for the first three years. It has since grown into one of the largest and most successful Short+Sweet Festivals in the world.

In Dublin Short+Sweet started in October 2019 at the Sean O'Casey Theatre.

Short+Sweet Dance premiered at the Newtown Theatre in Sydney in 2007 for one week. In 2009 the Sydney season expanded to three weeks and the first ever Short+Sweet Dance Melbourne was held at Chapel Off Chapel under the direction of Alister Smith in June, 2009.

Short+Sweet Song, which comprises ten-minute musical theatre works, began in 2007 at the Seymour Centre and the third Short+Sweet Song was held in October 2009 at the Pilgrom Theatre in Sydney in association with the Australian Institute of Music. The 2009 Festival was led by Festival Director Andrew Threlfall and Musical Director Bev Kennedy.

Short+Sweet Cabaret merges theatre and music.

Short+Sweet Voices debuted in Sydney in 2015 at The Concourse. A minimum of 4 people perform in a choir.

Short+Sweet Bollywood debuted in Sydney in 2015 at The Factory Theatre. It stages Indian dance, which many Indian Short+Sweet festivals such as in Delhi, Mumbai, Chennai, Bangalore and Hyderabad already incorporate into their programs.

Short+Sweet Comedy features stand-up comedy acts.

Short+Sweet Magic premiered at the New Theatre in Sydney in 2016 and was created and led by Festival Director Pete Malicki. The show features short magical acts.

== History ==
Short+Sweet began in Sydney in January 2002, with the first ever Short+Sweet Theatre, at a single venue, the Newtown Theatre, and has steadily gained in popularity and size, now encompassing multiple venues such as Sidetrack Theatre and the Seymour Centre.

The inaugural artistic director was Sam Genocchio. Other former artistic directors include Regina Botros and Alex Broun and Pete Malicki (2012 to 2015 and 2018. Malicki also served as Short+Sweet Theatre International Literary Manager from 2011 to 2020).

Short+Sweet Theatre Melbourne began in December, 2005 at the Arts Centre. It began at the Black Box theatre, moving to the Fairfax Studio in 2006. In 2009, it re-located to Chapel Off Chapel in Prahan, which also hosted the first ever Short+Sweet Dance Melbourne.

The Singapore Festival premiered in June 2007 at Lasalle College of the Arts and the Esplanade Theatres on the Bay. It featured plays in Mandarin as well as English.

Short+Sweet Theatre in Australia is coordinated in Brisbane, Gold Coast and Townsville by Sean Dennehy, Brodie Peace and Nicola Jones and in Canberra by director Kate Gaul.

Founder Mark Cleary is the creative director for Short+Sweet International.

== Spin-offs ==
A number of other projects have been created under the banner of Short+Sweet:

- Shorter+Sweeter is a touring showcase of the best plays from Short+Sweet Theatre. In 2010 the third tour of Shorter+Sweeter toured Australia for five months through support of the Australian Government via Playing Australia, featuring the actors Josephine Clark, Roanna Dempsey, Nicholas Gunn, Sonya Kerr, Charlie Mycroft & Carl J. Sorheim.
- Fast+Fresh is a 10-minute theatre competition for participants under the age of 18. It premiered in Sydney in 2005 under the guidance of Neil Gooding and has also been run in Melbourne.
- Crash Test Drama has an affiliation with Short+Sweet, pioneered by Harry Paternoster and Bearing Your Arts in Melbourne. On the nights of the performances, actors audition and the writers and directors cast their plays. They are rehearsed for an hour or so and then are performed to the public as a moved reading (script in hand). Many winning plays of each season are invited to Short+Sweet. It is currently held in Sydney, Cronulla, Melbourne, Canberra, Bundanoon and Townsville.

== Participants ==
Many notable playwrights, directors, actors and independent theatre companies have participated in Short+Sweet.

=== Playwrights ===
- Alex Broun
- Alan Seymour
- Aishveryaa Nidhi
- Ben Ellis
- Brendan Cowell
- Daniel Henshall
- Elspeth Tilley
- Jeff Locker
- Judy Balan
- Kate Mulvany
- Mathivanan Rajendran
- Naren Weiss
- Nick Enright
- Pete Malicki
- Sam Meikle
- Tom Taylor
- Xavier Samuel

=== Actors ===
- Amanda Bishop
- Anna Lise Phillips
- Ben Mendelsohn
- Ben Oxenbould
- Damian Rice
- Damon Herriman
- Daniel Henshall
- Dasi Ruz
- Ewen Leslie
- Fayssal Bazzi
- Jonny Pasvolsky
- Josh Lawson
- Ken James
- Nicholas Papademetriou
- Nicole da Silva
- Rose Byrne
- Salvatore Coco
- Sam Atwell
- Susie Youssef
- Toby Truslove
- Trilby Glover
- Zoe Tuckwell-Smith

=== Directors ===
- Ben Oxenbould
- Denise Roberts
- Nicholas Papademetriou
- Peter Sumner
- Shannon Murphy
- Terry Serio

=== Independent theatre companies ===
- Abhinay School of Performing Arts
- Red Stitch
- Theatre in Decay
- Stray Factory
- Brymore Productions
