= Samir Kochhar =

Indian actor and television presenter (born 1980)

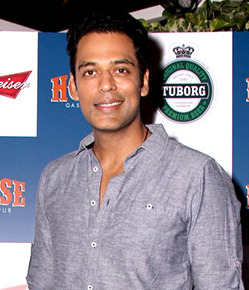
- Kochhar in 2016
- Born: 23 May 1980 (age 45); New Delhi, India
- Occupations: Actor; presenter
- Years active: 2003–present
- Spouse: Radhika Kochhar (m. 2010)
- Children: 2

Samir Kochhar (born 23 May 1980) is an Indian actor and television presenter known for being the host of the pre-match Indian Premier League show, Extraaa Innings T20. He currently stars in Netflix India's Sacred Games.

== Career ==
Kochhar started his career with Doordarshan's AIDS awareness cum travel show Haath Se Haath Mila which he anchored with Sugandha Garg. He made his Bollywood film debut in 2003 with Sumeer Sabharwal's bilingual film Valentine Days.

Kochhar made his television debut with Dangerous, a talk show on sex, which was broadcast on Zoom. He appeared as Rajat Kapur in the soap opera Bade Achhe Lagte Hain. In 2005, he appeared in Mohit Suri's Zeher (2005) and followed it with the thriller Jannat (2008), where he played a police inspector.

Kochhar was part of Island City directed by Ruchika Oberoi, that received rave reviews at the Venice International Film Festival as well as the JIO MAMI Film Festival 2015 in Mumbai. He will also be seen in Mango Dreams, a feature film set in India, directed by American director John Unchurch.

Kochhar is also part of the CCL (Celebrity Cricket League) team Mumbai Heroes.

Kochhar had two commercial releases in 2016 - Sajid Nadiadwala's Housefull 3 with Akshay Kumar and Mango Dreams and Hume Tumse Pyaar Kitna with Karanvir Bohra directed by Lalit Mohan which is set to release in 2018 and after Jannat 3 (2025)

== Personal life ==
Kochhar married his longtime girlfriend Radhika on 9 January 2010. In April 2015, they became parents to a baby boy whom they named Kabir and a baby girl named Sara in October 2017.

== Filmography ==
=== Films ===
Year	Film name	Role	Other notes
2005	Zeher	Sean Verghese	
2006	Bold		
2006	Ek Se Mera Kya Hoga	Bashir	
2008	Jannat	ACP Shekhar Malhotra	
2008	Chintakayala Ravi	Guest appearance	Telugu film
2008	The Mole		British film
2010	Hide & Seek		
2010	Chase	Inspector Siddharth	
2012	Survivor India	Host	
2012	Dangerous Ishhq	Rashid	Durgam Shah's second life
2015	Island City		
2016	Housefull 3	Rishi	
2016	Mango Dreams	Abhi	
2017	Munna Michael	Ramesh	
2019	Hume Tumse Pyaar Kitna	Ranvir Dhillon	
2019	Charlie Chaplin 2		Tamil Film
2020	Adho Andha Paravai Pola		Tamil Film
2022	Qala	Chandan Lal Sanyal	

=== Television ===
Year	Show title	Role	Notes
2003	Haath Se Haath Mila	Himself	Doordarshan + BBC collaboration
2004-05	Full Toss	Himself	Hungama TV
2012–2014	Bade Achhe Lagte Hain	Rajat Kapoor	Sony Entertainment Television
2017	The Test Case	Shivalik Ahuja	ALTBalaji
2018	Jio Dhan Dhana Dhan	Himself	
2018	Sacred Games	SPI Markand	Netflix
2019	Typewriter	Peter Fernandez	Netflix
2020-22	Four More Shots Please!	Shashank Bose	Amazon Prime
2020	The Bid and Win Show	Host	Flipkart Video Originals
2020	Powerplay with Champions	Host	Flipkart Video Originals
2022	Mind the Malhotras	Rishabh Jain	Netflix
2024	Hustlers - Jugaad Ka Khel	Mihir Jain	Prime Video Miniseries
2024	Moonwalk	Maddy	JioCinema
