= Bhargavi Rao =

Telugu novelist, translator, and English professor at Osmania University

Bhargavi Prabhanjan Rao
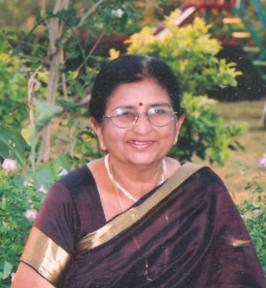
- Born: 14 August 1944; Bellary, Madras Presidency, British India (now in Karnataka, India)
- Died: 23 May 2008 (aged 63); Hyderabad, Andhra Pradesh, India (now in Telangana, India)
- Occupations: Author, Professor, translator, Poet
- Writing career
- Genre: Fiction
- Notable work: Noorella Panta

Bhargavi Prabhanjan Rao (14 August 1944 – 23 May 2008), a Sahitya Akademi awardee, was an eminent translator in Telugu Literature. She was actively involved in translating various works of author and playwright Girish Karnad. Her most famous works include Noorella Panta, a compilation of one hundred short stories by women writers of the twentieth century. She died due to a heart attack on 23 May 2008 in Hyderabad.

== Early life ==
Bhargavi Rao was born to Santhy and Narahari Rao Tagat in Bellary, Karnataka into a Kannadiga family. She was the eldest of 5 siblings, two brothers and two sisters – Venkatesh and Prasad, Gayathri and Padmaja. She also appeared as a child actress in two regional films, and lent her voice to radio as well. She then married Prabhanjan Rao, and continued with her studies in the field of English Literature, before achieving a master's degree from Osmania University. She went on to do her PhD in Osmania University, thus earning the title of Dr. Bhargavi P. Rao. She then taught English at Osmania University (first at Women's College, Koti and then at Nizam College), till her retirement in 2004. After retiring, she was appointed Honorary Professor in the Potti Sriramulu Telugu University in Hyderabad.

== Personal life ==
She married Prabhanjan Rao in June 1960 at Tirupati. She has 3 daughters: Mithravinda, Sharvani, and Sushmitha. She has 6 grandchildren: Vaishnavi, Pradyumna, Maya, Mukund, Vaikunt and Saaketh. She has been living at Santoshnagar, Hyderabad since 1977.

== Literary works ==
Her publications in Telugu include Album and Needala Godalu (Poems), Gundelo thadi, Chukka Navvindi and NaaPeru (short stories), Abhisarika, Thoorpu Gaali (novels), Pranava Ganga (dance ballet), and Saugandhika (monologue);she also co-authored Urvasi, a Kuchipudi dance ballet, with Varanasi Nagalakshmi. Her translations of Girish Karnad's Kannada plays are: Naagamandala, Hayavadana, Taladandam, Tughluq and Agni Varsham. Her other translations are Siri Sampenga and Kathaga Maarina Ammayi. Among her anthologies, other than Noorella Panta, are Mudra (women poets), Nooru Varahalu (short stories), Inkaanaa! Ikapai Saagadu (Dalit stories), Aaha!Oho! (humorous stories). Various of her translated plays, have gone on to become famous within the State of Andhra Pradesh.

Collaborating with Dr. Bhargavi Rao was P Jayalakshmi, they translated and published Seela Subhadra Devi's full-length poem Yudham Oka Gunde Kotha into English as War a Heart's Ravage in March 2003.

Her publications in English include Pebbles on the Sea Shore (short stories), Hiccups (poems), and Meru Kanchana (novel), Colours and Cadences: Poems from the Romantic Age (co-edited with T. Vijay Kumar). She has translated several works into English and also has academic works to her credit. She was also actively involved in contributing to a Literary e-journal, Muse India.

Her last piece of work was "Putra Kameshti" which won the runner-up prize in a contest conducted by Swathi Magazine.

== Awards and recognition ==
Her translation of Girish Karnad's play, Taledanda, won her the Sahitya Akademi Award in 1995. She is also recipient of PS Telugu University Award (1999), Sakhya Sahiti Award (2000) and Grihalakshmi Award (2001). Bhargavi Rao was a member of the Telugu Association of North America (TANA) and Telugu Literary and Cultural Association

== See also ==
- Kannada
- Kannada literature
- Telugu literature
- Women's writing
