= N. K. Sharma =

Indian theatre director

N.K. Sharma
- Born: Narendra Kumar Sharma
- Other name: पंडित जी
- Occupations: Theatre Actor & Director
- Years active: 1978 - present
- Known for: Founder of Act One theatre group
- Notable work: Aksar Maine Socha Hai, Hamaar Babuji Ki Chhatri

N.K. Sharma is an Indian theatre director and acting teacher, and founder of 'Act One' theatre group. Since 1978, he has been a freelance theatre person, working all over India in many languages and with many traditional forms. Sharma has worked with Safdar Hashmi.

== Early life and career ==
He began his theatre career with the Jana Natya Manch (Janam)- to be in association with Communist Party of India (Marxist), he was in the government sector, where no employee was allowed to participate in any political activities. After years with 'Janam' He founded a theatre group 'Act One' in 1990 with Manoj Bajpayee.

" Acting is something that can be learnt, but never taught. You learn from life. A person should be real, true to character,”

— N. K. Sharma on Keeping it real,.

In the 1990s, the group included actors like Piyush Mishra, Manoj Bajpai, Gajraj Rao, Ashish Vidyarthi and Shoojit Sircar.

He has co-written the Hindi play Gagan Damama Bajyo based on the life of freedom fighter Bhagat Singh, with Piyush Mishra.

“You must be interested in people if you want stories. Shakespeare lived before Marx, but he wrote working-class stories. The Panchatantra was all about the triumph of good over evil and the desire to live. Stories are going to come back. Look at (Steven) Spielberg’s last four films. The spotlight will return to the actor,” - He told to The Hindu.

| Play | Writer-Director |
|---|---|
| Aksar Maine Socha hai | N.K.Sharma |
| Hamaar Babuji Ki Chhatri | N.K.Sharma |
| Aao Saathi Sapna Dekhen | Harsh Khurana-N.K.Sharma |
| Movie | Associate/Assistant Director |
| Angaar (1992) | N.K.Sharma |

== Notable students ==
- Manoj Bajpayee
- Deepak Dobriyal
- Huma Qureshi
- Ashish Vidyarthi
- Piyush Mishra
- Darshan Kumar
- Shoojit Sircar
- Dino Morea
