= Aishveryaa Nidhi =

Australian actress

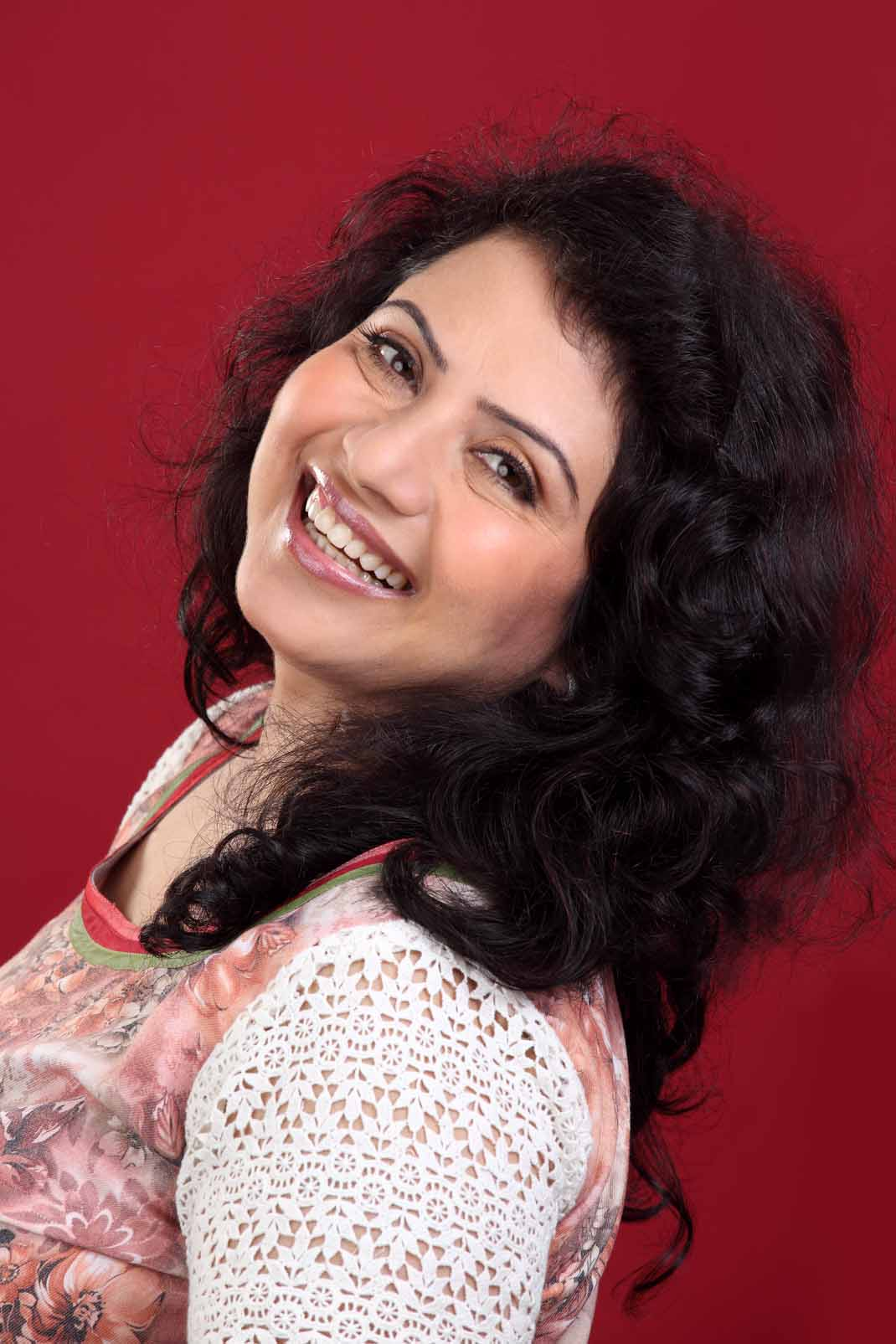
- Aishveryaa Nidhi ऐश्वेर्या निधि
- Born: New Delhi
- Citizenship: Australia
- Occupations: Actress, director, producer, writer

Aishveryaa Nidhi (ऐश्वेर्या निधि) is an Australian actress, director, writer, and theatre personality based in Los Angeles. She has performed with the Short and Sweet festivals, and has worked to start Short and Sweet Bollywood. Other works include Gandhari... In search of light, a play about the character Gandhari from Vyasa's Hindu epic Mahabharata which has toured widely. She is also the president and artistic director of Abhinay School of Performing Arts, in Sydney.

== Personal life ==
She was born and raised in New Delhi, India. She moved with her family to Auckland, New Zealand in 2001, and then to Sydney a year later. Her son, Shourya Nidhi, is an actor and a businessman.

== Theatre and acting ==
She has worked with the Sydney Theatre Company in the 2010 stage adaptation of John Birmingham's novel Leviathan, and the 2013 play The other way, performed in Bankstown Arts Centre and Sydney Theatre Company in 2013. She acted in Abhinay School of Performing Arts production, a one-woman play Gandhari... In search of light, which is the story of Gandhari from the Hindu epic Mahabharata. It was scripted and directed by Arvind Gaur, and premiered at the National Institute of Dramatic Art, Sydney, in 2005. The play was later staged in Delhi, Kurukshetra, Lucknow, Amritsar, Jaipur, Jodhpur, Mumbai Sydney Fringe Festival and also Hollywood Fringe Festival.

Gandhari was also performed in the International One Man Show Festival held by ITI UNESCO. In 2009 she acted in David Sharpe's Mandragora in Short and Sweet Sydney, the largest ten-minute play festival in the world. Mangragora was adjudged first and was invited to be performed in Gala Finals, where Nidhi became the first Indian Australian ever nominated for the 'Best Actress' award at the festival. With her play 'Irish Stew', written by Cary Pepper, she became the first Indian-Australian director, whose play was invited to be performed at People's Choice Showcase at Short+Sweet, Sydney 2014. She is an executive producer and actor in the 2006 independent US film Beyond life. She has also done narration for documentaries radio shows. Nidhi has also consulted for Opera Australia's production of Lakmé, where she was a movement, gestures, and physicality consultant to the cast.
