= Mango Dreams =

- Film poster
- Directed by: John Upchurch
- Written by: Mazahir Rahim; Hamza Rahim
- Story by: John Upchurch
- Produced by: John Upchurch; Mazahir Rahim
- Starring: Ram Gopal Bajaj; Pankaj Tripathi; Samir Kochhar
- Cinematography: Nouman Ahsan
- Edited by: John Upchurch
- Music by: Sunil Kaushik
- Production company: Jack Films
- Release date: April 23, 2016 (Arizona International Film Festival)
- Running time: 93 minutes
- Countries: USA; India
- Language: English

Mango Dreams is a 2016 English-language drama film produced and directed by John Upchurch.

== Plot ==
As a child, Dr. Amit Singh survived the British partition of India. Since then, he has been running forward his whole life, running from the horrors of his past — his family murdered by Muslims and the personal guilt he feels for the death of his brother. Now, with the onset of dementia, Amit must return to his childhood home and confront the memories he has been trying to forget before dementia robs him of his last chance for peace. But before the journey home begins, Amit's son Abhi arrives from America to commit his father to a old age home.

Amit runs away and encounters Salim. Salim is a Muslim auto-rickshaw driver whose wife was raped and burned to death by Hindu rioters. Amit had earlier saved the life of Salim's son. Salim offers to drive the doctor anywhere as a way of repaying his debt. When Amit asks to be taken home, Salim cannot imagine how far he will end up going for the doctor or where the journey will lead them. Along the way, Amit and Salim forge an unforgettable friendship and help each other discover the peace they have been longing for.

== Cast ==
- Ram Gopal Bajaj as Amit
- Pankaj Tripathi as Salim
- Samir Kochhar as Abhi
- Rohini Hattangadi as Padma
- Kamna Pathak as Impatient Passenger
- S M Zaheer as Prashant
- Naseeruddin Shah as Abhay

== Reviews ==
Business Standard gave the movie 1.5 stars and wrote "If the truth be told, "Mango Dreams" is a cinematic equivalent of that nice well-behaved boy in class who wants to be the prefect every time. Utterly bereft of spontaneity and warmth, this could be one of Indie cinema's most shuddery products".

== Accolades ==
- 2016 Arizona International Film Festival - Special Jury Award for Bridging Cultures
- 2016 Cebu International Film Festival - Humanity Award (Merit Award for Best in Content)
- 2017 London Asian Film Festival - Best Script
- 2017 Telly Awards
  - Cinematography: Nouman Ahsan, Amit Singh
  - Directing: John Upchurch
