= Daayen Ya Baayen =

- Promotional poster
- Directed by: Bela Negi
- Written by: Bela Negi
- Produced by: Sunil Doshi
- Starring: Deepak Dobriyal; Manav Kaul
- Cinematography: Amlan Datta
- Edited by: Bela Negi
- Music by: Vivek Philip
- Production companies: Alliance Media & Entertainment Pvt. Ltd.
- Release date: 29 October 2010
- Country: India
- Language: Hindi

Daayen Ya Baayen is a Hindi drama film, directed by Bela Negi and produced by Sunil Doshi. The film was released on 29 October 2010 under the Alliance Media & Entertainment Pvt. Ltd. banner. The film revolves around the life of Ramesh Majila, a schoolteacher in a remote hilly village, who happens to win a luxury car that takes him on an unexpected journey.

== Plot ==
After returning from Mumbai to Kanda in Uttarakhand, Ramesh Majila (Deepak Dobriyal), who lives a poor lifestyle with his mother; wife Hema; son Baju; and sister-in-law Deepa, takes on the job of a school-teacher in a building which is over-run by mice. He decides to canvas the village folk into building a Kala Kendra while his friend, Basant, enters his name in a draw to win a car. To their surprise, he is indeed awarded the car – making him the only one to own one in the entire village – much to the chagrin of local contractor Jwar Singh. Ramesh quickly learns how to drive, however he soon finds out that the car needs maintenance, especially when it gets damaged, and a mechanic has to be called from out of town. He finds out that Basant has borrowed money to repair the car; while Jwar asks him to drive the car at a competition to pay off the debt. Ramesh agrees, but changes his mind at the last moment. His car was then taken over by Jwar's goons for losses incurred, but Sundar and Basant assist Ramesh in locating its whereabouts. The car gets stolen and an enraged Jwar Singh accuses Ramesh of stealing the car and asks him to re-pay the debt, leaving him to ponder who would have stolen the car from Jwar's property.

== Cast ==
- Deepak Dobriyal as Ramesh Majila
- Manav Kaul as Sundar
- Badrul Islam as Basant
- Bharti Bhatt as Hema R. Majila
- Pratyush Sharma as Baju R. Majila
- Girish Tiwari as School Principal
- Jeetendra Bisht as Jwar Singh
- Dhanuli Devi as Mrs. Majila / Amma
- Aarti Dhami as Deepa
- Dhananjay Shah as Hema's brother
- Aditi Beri as Meena
- Dilawar Karki as Jwar's Croon
- Manoj Pathak as Junior artist
