= Elspeth Tilley =

Australian playwright and academic

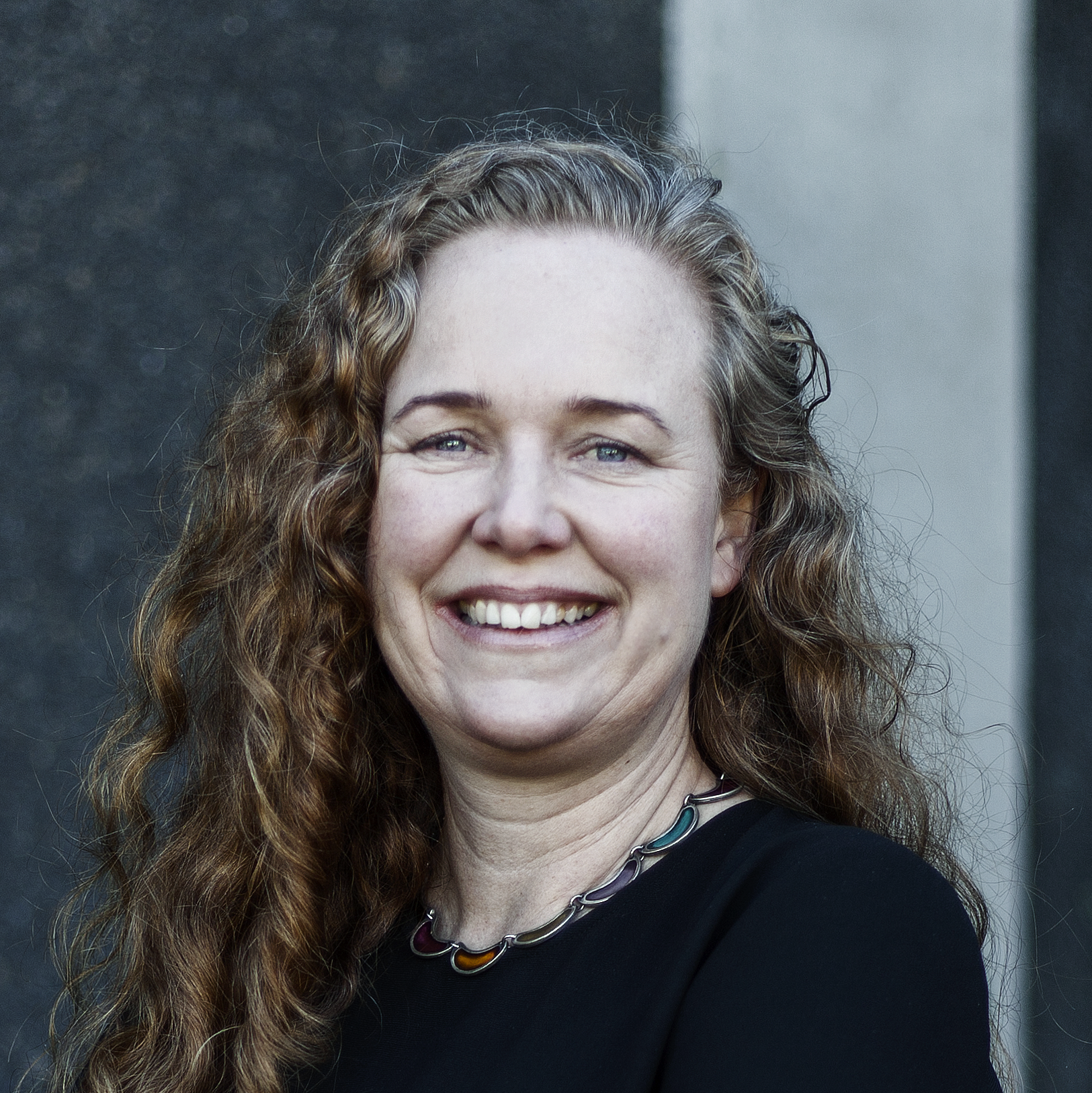
- Tilley in 2016
- Born: Elspeth Nina Tilley

Academic background
- Education: University of Queensland

Elspeth Nina Tilley is an Australian playwright, actor and academic and is a full professor at Massey University in Wellington, New Zealand.

== Academic career ==
Tilley earned a BA(Hons) in 1996 at the University of Queensland with a thesis called More than one and solo: subjectivity in contemporary Australian and Canadian monodrama, which she followed with a PhD in drama and literature in 2007. Her doctoral thesis, also at Queensland, was titled White vanishing: a settler Australian hegemonic textual strategy, 1789-2006. After this Tilley moved to Massey University, where she was promoted to full professor in 2023.

Tilley's research covers theatre, performance, literature, media and public communication, examining ethics and social justice. She has published four books, including White Vanishing and Creative Activism: Research, Pedagogy and Practice.

Tilley's plays have been published in Canada, New Zealand, the US and the UK, produced around the world. Her plays have featured in a variety of festivals including the British Theatre Challenge, Short + Sweet, Pint Sized Plays NZ, Climate Change Theatre Action, Stage-It 2 and have been translated into French, Italian, and Belizean Creole.

== Awards and honours ==
Tilley has won the British Theatre Challenge three times, in 2017, 2018 and 2019. Tilley was an official playwright for Climate Change Theatre Action in 2015, 2017, and 2019. She has also been awarded the Playwrights’ Association of New Zealand Outstanding Achievement Award (2018), three teaching excellence awards, a Peking University Research Fellowship and a Prime Minister's Group Scholarship to Latin America.

== Selected plays ==
- Waiting for Go, 2017 (short play, winner of British Theatre Challenge in 2017)
- Bunnies & Wolves, 2018 (short play, winner of British Theatre Challenge in 2018)
- Fabio the Great, 2019 (short play, winner of British Theatre Challenge in 2019 and awarded ‘Best Play’ by audience vote at Pint Sized Plays New Zealand, 2019)
- World, 2019 (finalist in Fratti-Newman Political Play Contest at Castillo Theatre in New York; equal first place in 2019 Playwrights’ Association of New Zealand Long Play Contest)
- Te Hā Tangata: The breath of the people (verbatim play about houseless people)

== Selected academic works ==
- Elspeth Tilley (2023) Applied theatre as transdisciplinary research: JustUs and the quest for second-order change, Research in Drama Education: The Journal of Applied Theatre and Performance, DOI: 10.1080/13569783.2023.2184682
- Tilley, Elspeth Nina (2005). "The Ethics Pyramid: Making Ethics Unavoidable in the Public Relations Process". Journal of Mass Media Ethics. 20 (4): 305–320. doi:10.1207/s15327728jmme2004_6. Wikidata Q114988782.
- Tilley, Elspeth Nina; John Cokley. "Deconstructing the Discourse of Citizen Journalism: Who Says What and Why It Matters". Pacific Journalism Review. 14 (1): 94–114. ISSN 1023-9499. Wikidata Q117474307.
- Hollings, James; Alan Samson; Tilley, Elspeth Nina; Lealand, Geoffrey Ronald (2007). "The big NZ journalism survey: underpaid, under-trained, under-resourced, unsure about the future-but still idealistic". Pacific Journalism Review. 13 (2): 175–197. ISSN 1023-9499. Wikidata Q117474308.
