= The Train Has Reached Amritsar =

Short story by Bhisham Sahni

- Short story by Bhisham Sahni
- Original title: Amritsar Aa Gaya Hai
- Country: India
- Language: Hindi (original)
- Genre(s): Partition of India literature

Publication

The Train Has Reached Amritsar (Hindi original: Amritsar Aa Gaya Hai) is a short story by Hindi author and playwright, Bhisham Sahni, set during the Partition of India. In the story a group of refugees are travelling from what has now become Pakistan towards Amritsar, the first border town in India, and the horrors and destruction they witness on the journey. Sahni also wrote his epic novel Tamas (Darkness, 1974) around partition, which was later adapted to a television film, by Govind Nihalani.

An English translation by Alok Bhalla, was also part of the anthology, Stories of Partition of India (1994).

== Adaptations ==
It was adapted into a Hindi stage play by theatre director, Vinod Kumar in 2011.

== Translation ==
- We Have Arrived in Amritsar and Other Stories, Tr. by Ashok Bhalla. Stosius Inc/Advent Books Division. ISBN 0-86131-998-2.

== See also ==
- Artistic depictions of the partition of India
