= Ram Gopal Bajaj =

Indian actor and academic (born 1940)

- Born: 1 July 1940 (age 86); Darbhanga, Bihar Province, British India
- Education: National School of Drama, Delhi
- Years active: 1965–present
- Known for: Director of NSD, Delhi
- Height: 5 ft 8 in (173 cm)
- Spouse(s): Sulochna Devi and Chandrakala Khemchand Prakash
- Children: Riju Bajaj, Aseem Bajaj, Shanti Prakash Bajaj
- Relatives: Leena Yadav Deepa Bajaj (daughter-in-law) Ravi prakash Bajaj Kajal Bajaj (Grandchildren)
- Awards: 1996: Sangeet Natak Akademi Award; 2003: Padma Shri; 2017: Kalidas Samman

Ram Gopal Bajaj is an Indian theatre director, academic, and a Hindi film actor. He has also been a faculty member and a former director of National School of Drama, New Delhi (November 1995 – September 2001).

He was awarded the Padma Shri in 2003, Sangeet Natak Akademi Award in 1996 and Life Time Achievement META Award in 2024 for his contribution to theatre.

== Biography ==
Bajaj graduated from the National School of Drama (NSD) in 1965. He became a member of its faculty and eventually its Director (November 1995 – September 2001). During his tenure as the head of NSD he started two theatre festivals, Bharat Rang Mahotsava (National Theatre Festival) and Jashn-e-Bachpan (National Children's Theatre Festival).

Over the years, he directed numerous plays with the NSD Repertory Company, starting with Surya Ki Antim Kiran Se, Surya Ki Pehli Kiran Tak in 1974, Jai Shankar Prasad’s Skand Gupta in 1977, followed by Quaid-E-Hayaat in 1989. His other noted production was Ashadh Ka Ek Din by Mohan Rakesh in 1992. He also was the Chief of the NSD Repertory Company from 1988 to 1994. He translated Girish Karnad's Rakt Kalyan (Taledanda) into Hindi, first directed by Ebrahim Alkazi for NSD and then by Arvind Gaur (1995) for Asmita Theater.

In 2017, he was honoured with Kalidas Samman by the Government of Madhya Pradesh.

== Career ==
Bajaj has been connected with the film industry for over three decades, first as an assistant director in art films like Utsav (1984) and Godhuli (1977), later appearing in character roles in films like, Masoom (1983), Hip Hip Hurray (1984), Mirch Masala (1985), and Chandni (1989). His most noted film roles have been in Parzania and as the Guru, in Jackie Chan starrer, The Myth, both in 2005. He starred as Dr. Amit Singh in Mango Dreams (2016) and in Jolly LLB 2 as Advocate Rizvi Sahab.

He also starred as "Shankar Dayal Bajpai" and Vikramaditya Singh" in the popular StarPlus TV serials, Navya..Naye Dhadkan Naye Sawaal (2011) and Rishton Ka Chakravyuh (2017) respectively. His latest serial was Sufiyana Pyaar Mera that aired in 2019 on Star Bharat, where he played the character of Sayyed Shehriyat "Miajaan" Shah Ghazi.

He will be seen in LSD Pvt Ltd next TV show for zeetv

In July 2025, Bajaj appeared as "Nana ji" (Manju Devi's father) in the critically acclaimed Season 4 of the Amazon Prime Video series Panchayat. His ~10-minute cameo was widely praised for its incisive political commentary and impactful dialogue.

He is a member of the academic council of National School of Drama, New Delhi.

He has mentored actors such as Irrfan Khan, Raghubir Yadav, and Neena Gupta during his time at NSD. Bajaj translated Girish Karnad’s Rakt Kalyan into Hindi; this version was directed by Ebrahim Alkazi (1992) at NSD and by Arvind Gaur (1995) at Asmita Theatre.

== Filmography ==
=== Assistant Director ===
Year	Title	Role
1984	Utsav	Assistant Director
1977	Godhuli	Assistant Director

=== Actor ===
Year	Title	Role
2017	Jolly LLB 2	Rizvi Sahab
2016	Mango Dreams	Dr. Amit Singh
2007	Parzania	Guru
2005	The Myth	
1989	Chandni	
1985	Mirch Masala	
1984	Hip Hip Hurray	
1983	Masoom	

=== Web series ===
Year	Title	Role	Platform	Notes
2019	The Verdict - State vs Nanavati	Bhai Pratap	ALTBalaji and ZEE5	
2025	Panchayat	Manju Devi's Father	Amazon Prime	Season 4

== See also ==
- Theatre in India
