= Alex Broun =

Australian playwright and screenwriter

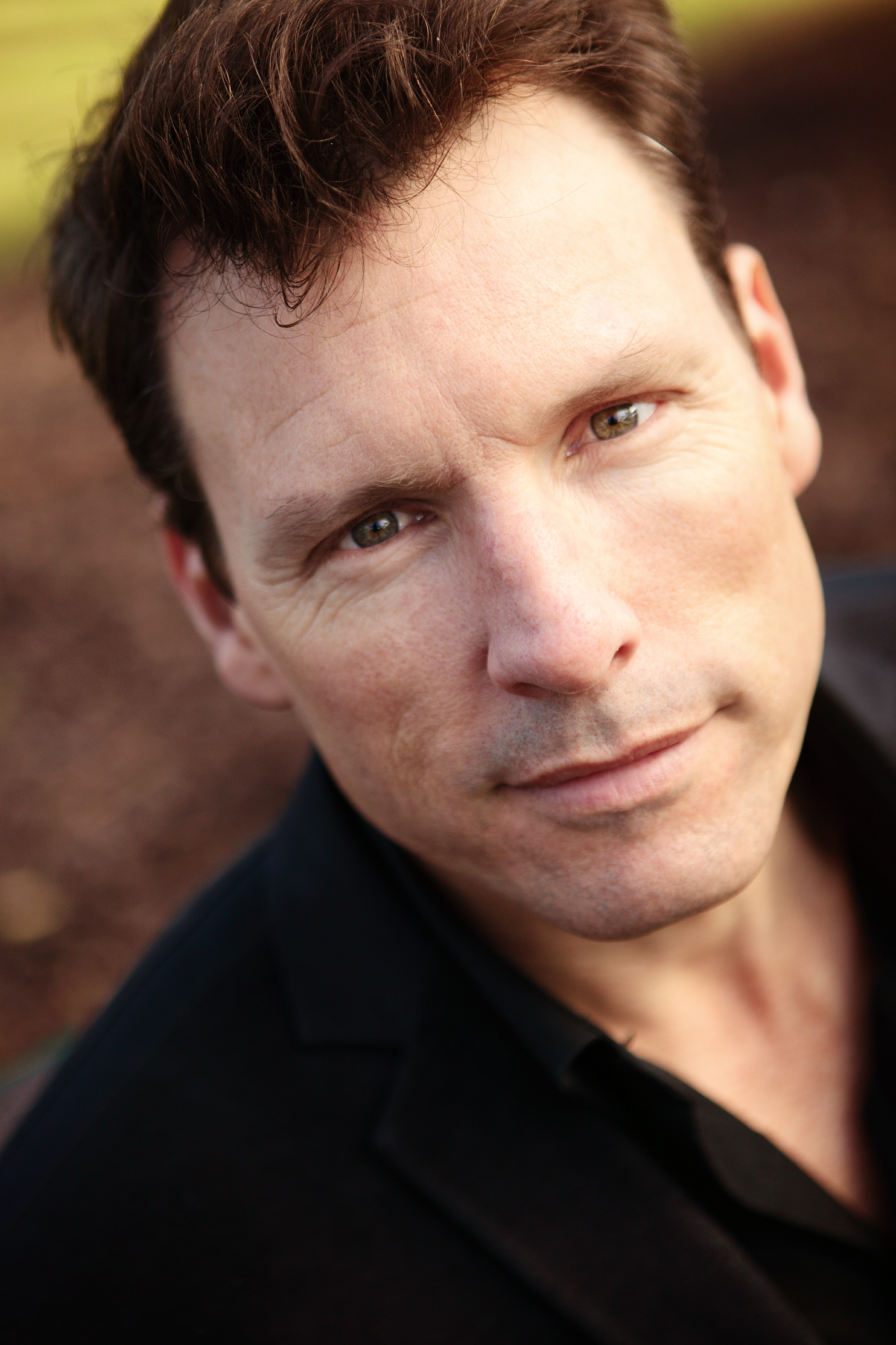
- Born: Alexander Alan Hercules Broun; Sydney, Australia
- Occupations: Playwright, screenwriter, director, rugby journalist, workshop facilitator, festival director
- Years active: 1979–present
- Website: www.alexbroun.com

Alex Broun is an Australian theatre director/producer, playwright and screenwriter, who has worked extensively with Short+Sweet, a series of theatre festivals for productions of ten minutes or less. Born in Sydney, Australia, he has been referred to as "the Shakespeare of short plays". Broun has had over 100 ten-minute plays produced in over 2000 productions in more than 40 countries globally, and his plays have been translated into many languages. He has also worked extensively as a Rugby journalist and served as Media Manager for the Springboks (1997–2000), the British & Irish Lions (2001), and the Melbourne Rebels (2007).

== Theatre history ==
In his early years Broun trained at the Australian Theatre for Young People in Sydney, Australia, acting in plays alongside Nicole Kidman. His work has been performed at the Sydney Festival, Edinburgh Festival and Brighton Festival. Among his performed plays are The Jacaranda Tree, Vicious Streaks, and Just Once.

Half a person – my life as told by The Smiths – a one-man show based on the music of The Smiths – was produced by Fly-on-the-wall Theatre (Directed by Robert Chuter, starring David Foster) at FEAST in Adelaide in 2006 and at the Newtown Theatre in Sydney in September 2007. The play was then re-mounted by Fly-on-the-Wall Theatre at Chapel off Chapel in Melbourne, Australia starring Mark Taylor in May 2010. It then returned for an encore season at the same venue in August the same year before being performed at the Edinburgh Fringe Festival in 2012, directed by Donald Pulford and performed by Joseph Murray. In 2014 this production transferred to the Kings Head Theatre in London.

As a director, he directed Woomera by Josh Wakely at the Old Fitzroy Hotel Theatre in Sydney, Australia, in 2002.

PFV (Potential for Violence) was included in the Premiere Season of 4 one act plays by the Hornsby Ku-ring-gai PCYC Theatre Co., in November 2010

Together, we are Anna, a ten-minute play about anti-corruption campaigner Anna Hazare was published in the Mumbai Mirror in August 2010.

10,000 beers, a full-length play, opened at Darlinghurst Theatre, In September 2011, directed by Lee Lewis with Gus Murray, Matt Zeremes, Andrew William Steele and Anthony Taufa. The play was then remounted by The Blue Room Theatre Summer Nights & Turquoise Theatre in association with PICA as part of Fringeworld in Perth in February 2014. 10,000 beers was nominated for Best Stage Play in the 2012 AWGIE Awards

In October 2013, he wrote and co-directed Oneness-Voice without form , the life of Swami Vivekananda, at the Playhouse of the Sydney Opera House before touring to BMAC in Brisbane. The play was also performed at the American School of Dubai in May 2015.

In 2014, Truth beauty and a picture of you, a musical written with Tim Freedman premiered at the Hayes Theatre Company in Sydney, Australia'. Disappointed at the Sydney critics' response to the show Broun wrote a response on The Australian website. Also in 2014, November Spawned a Monster, the companion piece to Half a person – my life as told by The Smiths was produced at The Old Fitzroy Hotel in Sydney in November, directed by Robert Chuter (director) and starring James Wright.

In November 2016 the inaugural Alex Broun Play Festival was held at The Junction in Dubai. This four-day event featured 44 of Alex's plays performed by over 100 Dubai actors, directors, schools and Theatre groups.

In December 2016 he co-wrote Howzat with actor/producer Asad Raza Khan, the first full-length English play to be set in contemporary UAE, which was performed at The Junction in Dubai. The play returned for a second season at The Junction in May 2017. Alex and Asad were jointly awarded the Best Script for the play at the 2017 Dubai Theatre Awards.

From June 2019 to October 2021 Alex was the Head of Drama at Studio Republik in Dubai, where he established their highly respected drama programme, and in November 2022 he was appointed Head of Performing Arts at Argan Bedaya in Kuwait.

In August 2022, Alex wrote and directed Blind City, a large scale modern adaptation of Inferno by Dante Alighieri with a cast of over 30 actors, at The Junction in Dubai.

In September 2023, Alex produced and directed, "Saudi Sing-along", a large scale musical performance at Ithra, the King Abdulaziz Centre for World Culture, in Dammam, Saudi Arabia. The performance played a key role in the 2023 National Day Celebrations throughout the Kingdom.

In December 2023, Alex produced the sold out show, "Behind the Red Curtain", presented by Music Theatre DXB, at TODA (Theatre of Digital Art), Souk Madinat Jumeirah, Dubai, as part of the NEO Theatre project.

In April 2024 his new play "torn" enjoyed its world premiere at Theatre by QE2 in Dubai, directed by the author, presented by Zara Stars and performed by Osman Aboubakr, Nadine Basiony, Elie Choufani and Liz Pinilla. The premiere was delayed by a week due to the serious Dubai flooding a week earlier.

== Film history ==
Broun received funding from the Australian Film Commission to write a script based on the sinking of the SIEV X in October 2001 when 353 asylum seekers lost their lives. This was the second time he had received funding from the AFC following his fifty-minute feature Clean Time which received Script Development funding.

He has also written and directed several community health videos for Dr Smita Shah: Running Short for the Triple A Asthma Awareness programme and Ryan's Goal for SALSA – Students as Life Style Activists initiative. Recently he adapted Krista Dalby's popular stage play Almost together with his own adaptation A Beautiful Request from his acclaimed play Half A Person both segments feature in the forthcoming film Cuatro directed by Robert Chuter.

As an actor his appearances include The Cowra Breakout (Directed by Phillip Noyce), alongside Kylie Minogue in Neighbours, Home and Away, A Country Practice and the films Watch the Shadows Dance (aka Night Zone) with Nicole Kidman, The Place at the Coast (Directed by George Ogilvie), Breaking Loose and The Boy Who Had Everything. He also appeared in the 1988 Australian television movie, The First Kangaroos.

== Activism ==
Broun has worked extensively as an activist for refugee rights with the Refugee Action Coalition (RAC NSW).

In 2004, he acted as Convenor for Artists Against Howard, a group of artists across Australia who joined together to work with Not Happy John and try to remove Australian Prime Minister John Howard from his Federal seat of Bennelong in Sydney's north.

In 2007 Broun organised the "Your Shout Forums" across Australia for the Shadow Arts Minister Peter Garrett, and co-ordinated the ALP's Federal Arts' Launch for the 2007 Federal Election at the Riverside Theatre Parramatta in Parramatta, Sydney.

In 2012 he became a National Ambassador for Welcome to Australia.

== Rugby history ==
Broun worked as the Media Manager for the South Africa Rugby Football Union and served as Springboks Media Liaison from 1997 to 2000 under coach Nick Mallett. During this time the Springboks equaled the world record for the most consecutive Test victories – 17 – from 1997 to 1998. They still share this record for Tier 1 Nations.

In 2001, Alex acted as Media Liaison for the British and Irish Lions on their tour of Australia. He also served as the Media Manager for the Melbourne Rebels in 2007 in the short-lived Australian Rugby Championship (ARC).

He has also worked for the Australian Rugby Union and has been employed for many years by Bauer Magazines (formally ACP Magazines) working on publications such as Inside Rugby and the Wallabies and NSW Waratahs match day programmes.

== Short+Sweet ==
Broun wrote and directed plays in the first Short+Sweet in Sydney in January 2002.

In January 2004, he took over as Artistic Co-ordinator of Short+Sweet Theatre Sydney, and he introduced many of the elements that have made Short+Sweet so successful – strict time-limit, limit of one play per playwright, one play per director and two plays per actor, people's choice voting and the competitive aspect where plays are chosen from each week to progress to the Gala Final.

He continued as the Artistic co-ordinator of Short+Sweet Sydney until 2006 and from 2005 to the 2008 he was also the Artistic co-ordinator of Melbourne Short+Sweet. In 2007, he was the Artistic Director of the inaugural Short+Sweet Singapore.

He has also served as the inaugural Festival Director of Short+Sweet Brisbane 2009, Short+Sweet Auckland 2010, Short+Sweet Delhi 2010 and 2011, Short+Sweet Bangalore 2012, Short+Sweet Rockhampton 2010 and 2012, Short+Sweet Canberra 2012 and Short+Sweet Sydney from 2009 to 2011.

In 2010 he was also Artistic Director of the national tour of Shorter+Sweeter, the best of Shorter+Sweeter that toured Australia from April to August.

In 2013 he launched the first ever Short+Sweet Dubai and in 2016 the inaugural Short+Sweet Abu Dhabi at New York University Abu Dhabi.

In 2020 he launched the inaugural Short+Sweet Sharjah as part of the Sharjah Fringe at the Masrah Theatre in Al Qasba.

Alex has helped to develop several other writers' careers including Jane Miller, Fiona Clarke, Lisa Eismen, Miles Blackford, Mark Andrew, Sharni Page, Greg Gould, Julia Britton and many others.
