= Madhavi (play) =

- 2008 English edition (publ. Seagull Books)
- Author: Bhisham Sahni
- Language: Hindi
- Genre: Play/drama
- Published: Lokbharti Prakashan (Rajkamal Prakashan) (India), 1982
- Publication place: India
- Media type: Print (hardback & paperback)
- Pages: 68
- ISBN: 9788170462019

Madhavi is an Indian play written in Hindi by Bhisham Sahni. This is a play in three acts which recounts an ancient tale of Madhavi, daughter of king Yayati from Mahabharata.

== Plot ==
The play is based on the story of Madhavi, daughter of King Yayati.

== Performances in theatre ==
The play has been staged in different forms over the years. It was first staged by director Rajendra Nath in 1982. In 2005, Rashi Bunny performed it as a solo play directed by Arvind Gaur.

In 2016, the play was staged in Shilpee theatre in Kathmandu. The play was staged and translated into Nepali by Tanka Chaulagain and starred Yuvraj Ghimire, Jeevan Baral, Archana Panthi, and Pradip Regmi.
