= Golapurab Brahmin =

Golapurab Brahmin (also sometimes called Galav) are a Brahmin community in western Uttar Pradesh and Madhya Pradesh regions of India.

== See also ==
- Golapurva
