= Narendra Mohan (poet) =

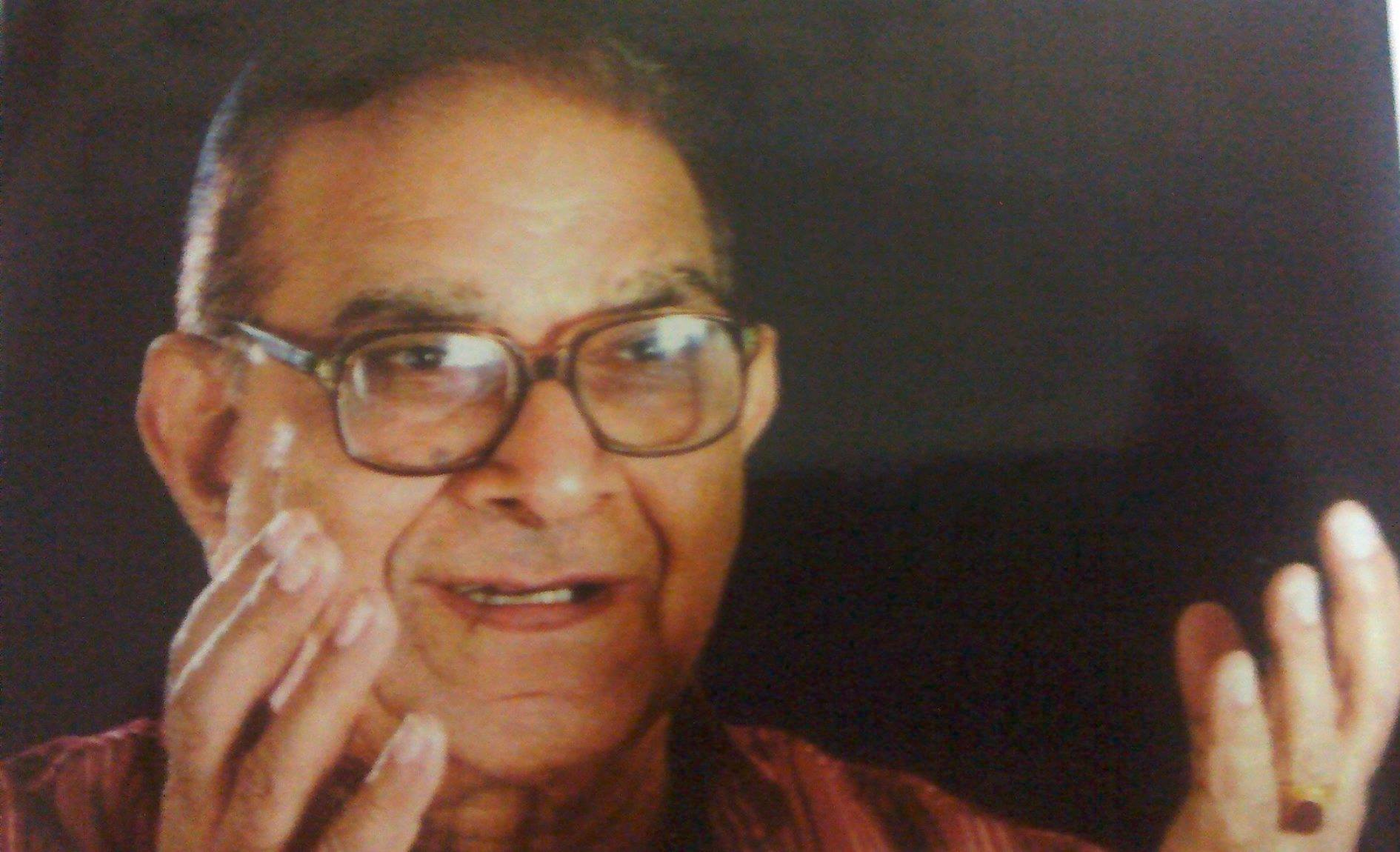
Narendra Mohan

Narendra Mohan (born 30 July 1935, in Lahore) is a Hindi author, poet and playwright.

== Biography ==
He has published twelve collections of poems, Nine plays, Thirteen books of literary criticism, and Twenty edited books on various themes and genres. His poems, plays, and critical articles have been translated into Punjabi, Urdu, Marathi, English, Telugu, Kannada, and other Indian languages.

Mohan got his Ph.D. in Modern Hindi Poetry (Adhunik Hindi Kavita Mein Aprastut Vidhan) at Panjab University in 1966. A number of poems and articles appeared starting in 1954 and by 1960, he was well known in literary circles.
