= Swatantra Theatre =

Indian theatre organization and troupe

- Logo of Swatantra Theatre
- Formation: 15 August 2007; 19 years ago
- Founded at: Pune, Maharashtra, India
- Type: Theatre organisation, performing arts center, and troupe
- Purpose: Theatre production, education and social awareness
- Location: Pune, Maharashtra, India
- Official language: Hindi, Marathi
- Key people: Abhijeet Choudhary; Dhanashree Heblikar; Yuwaraj Shah
- Website: swatantratheater.com

Swatantra Theatre is an Indian theatre organization and troupe based in Pune, India. The troupe produces and performs plays in Hindi language. In addition to theatre productions, the troupe also carries theatre education, training and theatre festival. It has staged productions across India. Swatantra's alumni include Shivankit Singh Parihar, Karan Kishore Parab, Tushar Kawle, Prakhar Singh. Mahadev Singh Lakhawat, Varun Rajput, Prashant Singh, Aarsvi Joshi and Aditya Singhal

Swatantra Theatre was founded by Abhijeet Choudhary, Dhanashree Heblikar and Yuwaraj Shah in 2007. Choudhary serves as a director of the plays, while Heblikar serves as creative director.

== History ==
In 2005, Abhijeet Choudhary, who was working as an actor at Asmita Theatre, and Dhanashree Heblikar, a stage actor, met in Pune and decided to start a theatre group that would produce Hindi-language plays solely, because at that time, the theatre of Pune was dominated by Marathi theatre. The theatre trope was founded on 15 August 2007. As of 2018, the troupe has 55 permanent members.

== Activities ==
Choudhary directs the plays produced by the troupe, and Heblikar serves as creative director and manages aesthetics including music, light, set, costumes. Swatantra organizes Swatantra Rang Hindi Theater Festival, a two or three-days theatre festival, annually. It also organizes Children's Theatre Festival twice in a year, and a virtual theatre festival, Rang-e-Dastaan. It organized workshops twice in a month to give education about on voice modulation, body control and acting.

The theatre presents the Yuwaraj of Theatre (YOTA) of Award annually on its anniversary day.

== Plays ==
Swatantra Theatre produces plays which often deal with the theme of social consciousness. It has also worked in experimental theatre. The troupe often performs plays on mental health awareness. The troupe has performed its plays at various places including Film and Television Institute of India, BHARANGAM-2020 AND BHARANGAM 2024National School of Drama,37th Pune Festival, Vizag Junior Theatre Festival, Kukdukoo Children's Festival[All over India] Deccan Literature Festival, National Defence Academy (NDA)., 37th Pune Festival at Bal Gandharva Ranga Mandir

Year	Play	Ref.
2008	Court Martial	
2008	Aaj Ki Taaza Khabar	
2008	Zindagi Ke Rang	
2008	Andha Yug	
2009	Gagan Damama Bajyo	
2009	Dhool Mein Lipta Sach	
2010	Dayashankar Ki Diary	
2010	Hamlet In My School	
2011	Ajab Sher Ki Gajab Kahani	
2011	Ji Jaisi Aapki Marzi	
2013	Cheaper By The Dozen	
2013	Mashaal Jalao Diye Se	
2014	Dakghar	
2014	Komal Gandhar	
2014	Gharonda	
2015	Chulbule Bulbule	
2016	Jis Lahore Nahi Dekhya wo Jamya Nai	
2016	Taj Mahal ka Tender	
2017	An Evening with Chekhov	
2017	Jhalkiyaan	
2018	Panchi Aise Aate Hain	
2019	Khamosh Adalat Jaari Hain	
2019	Jaag Utha Hai Raigad	
2020	Common Sadness	
2020	Vijeta Kaun	
2020	The Bicycle Girl	
2020	Sheher-e-Naqab	
2020	Bakri	
2020	Ujbak Raja Teen Dacoit	
2021	Sihar Uthi Thi Maut Yahan	
2022	Ashadh Ka Ek Din	
2022	Malgudi Days	
2023	Hamidabai Ki Kothi	

|- |2024 | Chauthi Cigarette | |- |2025 | Aadhe Adhure | |-

== Awards and Felicitations ==
- Maharashtra Rajya Natya Spardha Hindi 2018

Dhanashree Heblikar- Best Actor for Play Mujhe Amrita Chahiye
Rashmi Gupta Received Excellence in Acting for Play Mujhe Amrita Chahiye

- Maharashtra Rajya Natya Spardha Hindi 2019

Won 4th Best Play Tajmahal Ka Tender
Ashwin Sharma Best Actor for Play Tajmahal Ka Tender

- Maharashtra Rajya Natya Spardha Hindi 2020

Won 3rd Best Play Kabira Khada Bazar Mein
Dhanashree Heblikar Received Excellence in Acting for Play Kabira Khada Bazar Mein

- Bharat Rang Mahaotsav of National School Of Drama-2020

 Selected to Perform play "Jaag Utha Hai Raigad"

- Maharashtra Rajya Natya Spardha Hindi 2021

 Krushan Doshi Received Excellence in Acting for Play Jaag Utha Hai Raigad

- Maharashtra Rajya Natya Spardha Hindi 2022

  Sihar Uthi Thi Maut Yahan Received 7 Awards
  Best 2nd Play
  Best Director Abhijeet Choudhary
  Best Actor  Dhanashree Heblikar
              & Prashant Gowda
  Best Set Design Arun Jagtap
  Best Make-up Aayushi
  Excellence in Acting- Chezan Lawyer

- Maharashtra Rajya Natya Spardha Marathi 2022

 Kirti Kadam Received Excellence in Acting for Play "Raigadala Jeva Jaag Yete"

- Vizag Junior Theatre Fest 2023 In Vishakhapatnam

 Invited to Perform  Play "Malgudi Day" in English

- Bharat Rang Mahotsav of National School Of Drama-2024 in Jodhpur

  Selected to Perform Play "Sihar Uthi Thi Maut Yahan"

- Saheed Bhavan Bhopal 2024

 Invited to Perform Play "Sihar Uthi Thi Maut Yahan"

- Maharashtra Rajya Natya Spardha Hindi 2024

  Dhanashree Heblikar and Prashant Gowda Received Excellence in Acting Award for Play Hamida bai Ki Kothi Received

- 63rd Maharashtra Rajya Natya Spardha(1st Round) 2025, the Marathi play "Hamidabai Chi Kothi" received multiple awards

 2nd Best Play
 Best Acting- Dhanashree Heblikar and Prashant Gowda
 Best Direction- Abhijeet Choudhary
 Best Costumes and Makeup - Ankita Choudhary

- 63rd Maharashtra Rajya Natya Spardha Marathi (Final Round)-2025

 Aswhin Sharma Received Best Actor Awards from all over Maharashtra

- Maharashtra Rajya Natya Spardha Hindi 2025

 Rajeev Bhardwaj Received Exlcellnce in Acting Award for Play CHAUTHI CIGARRETE.

- Selected to Perform in 10th Aashirwaad National Theatre Festival 2025 at Dinkar Bhawan- Begusarai, Bihar -Play Hamidabai Ki Kothi.
