= Taledanda =

1990 Kannada-language play by Girish Karnad

Taledanda (Kannada: ತಲೆದಂಡ, Hindi: रक्त कल्याण, literally: Death by Beheading) is a 1990 Kannada-language play written by Girish Karnad, an eminent person in Kannada literature, about the rise of the radical protest and reform movement, Lingayatism, in 12th-century Karnataka. Karnad was awarded the Karnataka Sahitya Academy Award (1993) and the Sahitya Akademi Award in the Kannada language for the play in 1994, and later awarded the Jnanpith Award for his literature work in 1998.

== About the play ==
Written in 1989 in the backdrop of mandir-mandal conflict, the drama draws parallels between the Socio-Religious Political and Economic conditions of existing times and southern India in the 12th century A.D. during the Bhakti Movement. Eight hundred years ago in the city of Kalyan, a man called Basavanna assembled a congregation of poets, mystics, social revolutionaries and philosophers, unmatched for their creativity and social commitment in the history of Karnataka, even perhaps of India itself.

They opposed idolatry, rejected temple worship, upheld the equality of sexes, and condemned the caste system. Basavanna was leading the movement to remove gender inequality and the caste system. But the event took a violent turn when they acted on their beliefs and a Brahmin girl married a cobbler's son, so-called a 'low caste' boy. The movement ended in bloodshed so did the hopes of Basavanna die in despair. People too forgot the movement.

Rakt Kalyan (Tale-Danda) deals with a few weeks during which a vibrant, prosperous society plunged into anarchy and terror. In Hindi it is known as Rakt-Kalyan translated by Ram Gopal Bajaj, first directed by Ebrahim Alkazi for National School of Drama and remarkable production by Arvind Gaur (1995-2008, still running) for Asmita Theater Telugu translation of the play, by Bhargavi Rao won her the Sahitya Akademi Award Translation Award in 1995, given by Sahitya Akademi, India's National Academy of Letters.

== Translations ==
- Taledanda hindi, Ravi Dayal, 1993. ISBN 0-86311-529-2.
