= Mahesh Dattani =

Indian director, actor, and writer (born 1958)

- Born: 7 August 1958 (age 68); Bangalore, Mysore State (now Bengaluru, Karnataka), India
- Awards: Sahitya Akademi Award

Mahesh Dattani (born 7 August 1958) is an Indian director, actor, playwright, and writer. He has written several plays, including Final Solutions, Dance Like a Man, Bravely Fought the Queen, On a Muggy Night in Mumbai, Tara, Thirty Days in September and The Big Fat City.

He is the first English playwright to be awarded the Sahitya Akademi Award. Several noted directors, including Arvind Gaur, Alyque Padamsee, and Lillete Dubey, have directed his plays. Dattani's work addresses gender discrimination and deep-rooted stereotypes in society.

== Early life and background ==
Dattani was born in Bangalore to Gujarati parents. He attended Baldwin Boys High School and later joined St. Joseph's College, Bangalore. He studied history, economics, and political science, and holds a postgraduate diploma in Marketing and Advertising Management because he wanted to become a copywriter. He worked with the Bangalore Little Theatre, where he first appeared in Utpal Dutt's Surya Shikhar. After reading Edward Albee's play Who's Afraid of Virginia Woolf? early in his life, he became interested in writing. He was also influenced by Gujarati playwright Madhu Rye's Kumarni Agashi and developed an interest in playwriting.

== Career ==
Mahesh Dattani began his career as a copywriter in an advertising firm. In 1986, he wrote his first full-length play, Where There's a Will, and has worked as a full-time theatre professional since 1995. He has also worked with his father in the family business. Dattani's directorial debut was with the movie Mango Souffle, adapted from one of his plays. Later, he wrote and directed Morning Raaga.

== Plays ==
- Where There's a Will (1988)
- Dance Like a Man (1989)
- Tara: A Play in Two Acts (1990)
- Bravely Fought the Queen (1991)
- Final Solutions (1993)
- Do The Needful
- On a Muggy Night in Mumbai (1998)
- Seven Circles Round The Fire (Radio play for BBC) (Seven Steps around the Fire) (1998)
- 30 Days in September (2001)
- The Girl Who Touched the Stars (2007)
- Brief Candle (2009)
- Where Did I Leave My Purdah (2012)
- The Big Fat City (2012)

== Filmography ==
=== Director ===
- Mango Souffle
- Ek Alag Mausam
- Morning Raga
- Dance Like a Man

== Awards ==
- Dance Like a Man has won the award for the Best Picture in English awarded by the National Panorama in 1998
- Sahitya Academy award for his book of plays Final Solutions and Other Plays
- Sahitya Kala Parishad selected Final Solutions (1993), Tara (2000) and 30 Days in September (2007) as best productions of the year, directed by Arvind Gaur.
