= List of Hyderabadi-language films =

This is a list of the Deccani film industry's movies filmed in Hyderabadi Urdu and based on Hyderabadi culture. The movie does not need to be produced in Hyderabad. Films produced about Hyderabad should include words that are typically spoken by Hyderabadi working-class people. Going by this rule, one of Shyam Benegal's 2009 comedy classic Well Done Abba can also be called a film in 'Hyderabadi Urdu' and deserves a mention here although not listed below.

Title	Director	Cast	Genre	Release
2005
The Angrez	Kuntaa Nikkil	Kuntaa Nikkil, Mast Ali, Aziz Naser, Dheer Charan Srivastav	Comedy	02-10-2005
2006
Hyderabad Nawabs	Lakshmikanth Chenna	Mast Ali, Aziz Naser, Dheer Charan Srivastav	Comedy	01-01-2006
2007
Kal Ka Nawaab	Srinivas Gundreddy	Toyajakshi, Zakir, Siva, Saif, Dhanraj, Manjusri	Comedy	06-07-2007
Hungama in Dubai	Masood Ali	Mast Ali, Aziz Naser, Dheer Charan Srivastav	Comedy	07-09-2007
FM Fun Aur Masti	Sekhar Surya	Adnan Sajid Khan, Aziz Naser, R.K.	Comedy	11-11-2007
2008
Hyderabadi Bakra	Masood Ali	Mast Ali, Aziz Naser, Dheer Charan Srivastav, Shweta Khanduri	Comedy	04-01-2008
Thriller	Aziz Naser	Aziz Naser, Adnan Sajid	Horror	DD-MM-2008
Salam Hyderabad	K Anand	Ali, Aditya Om, Mukthar, Manisna Khelkar, Sheetal Phathak	Comedy	DD-MM-2008
Aadab Hyderabad	Sanjay Punjabi	Hyder Ali, Mujtaba, Meera, Razak Khan, Karuna Pande	Comedy	DD-MM-2008
2010
Gullu Dada Returns	Aziz Naser, Anil Boyidapu	Aziz Naser, Shagufta Zareen, Adnan Sajid Khan	Comedy	DD-MM-2010
Berozgaar	Aziz Naser, Anil Boyidapu	Abdulla, Afroz, Abdul Aleemuddin	Comedy	DD-MM-2010
2011
Inki Toh Aisi Ki Thaisi	Secundder	Altaf Hyder		
Family Pack	Anil	Altaf Hyder, R.K. Mama, Zarine Ali	Comedy	DD-MM-2011
Zabardast	Aziz Naser	Mast Ali, Aziz Naser, Adnan Sajid Khan	Comedy	DD-MM-2011
Faltu Company	Vicky	Altaf Hyder, Pushpa, Md Ali, Syed Mustafa, Sunny	Comedy	DD-MM-2011
Thriller				
Sab Ki Bolti Band				
Ja Bhai Ja				
Take Away				
2012
Gullu Dada Thiree	Abrar Khan	Adnan Sajid Khan, Aziz Naser, Akbar Bin Tabar	Comedy	28-12-2012
Sab Ki Boltee Band	Aleka Chowdary	Mast Ali, Altaf Hyder, Adnan Sajid Khan, Monalisa	Comedy	DD-MM-2012
2013
Ek Tha Sardaar	Secunnder	Adnan Sajid Khan, Md Taufeeq, Aziz Naser, Mukesh Rishi	Drama	18-10-2013
2014
Stepney	Aziz Naser	Adnan Sajid Khan, Aziz Naser	Comedy	
2015
The Angrez 2	Kuntaa Nikkil	Mast Ali, Aziz Naser, Dheer Charan Srivastav, Kuntaa Nikkil, Zeq McCoy	Comedy	15-05-2015
Gangs of Hyderabad	Saradh Reddy	Dheer Charan Srivastav, Adnan Sajid Khan, Farukh Khan	Comedy	18-09-2015
2016
Dawat E Shaadi	Syed Hussain	Adnan Sajid Khan, Mast Ali, Aziz Naser	Comedy	04-03-2016
Dubai Return	Aziz Naser	Aziz Naser, Adnan Sajid Khan	Comedy	06-07-2016
Badmash Pottey				
Hero Hyderabadi				
Best of Luck	Sanjay Punjabi	Adnan Sajid Khan, Preeti Nigam, Altaf Hyder		14-10-2016
Badi Chowdi	Manish Jain	Mudassir Khan, Ishika Singh		16-12-2016
2017
Salaam Zindagi	Syed Hussain	Mast Ali, Aziz Naser	Comedy	DD-MM-2017
Stepney 2	Saradh Reddy	Adnan Sajid Khan, Akbar bin Tabar	Comedy	17-02-2017
Gullu Dada 5				
127B	Seshu KMR	Mast Ali, Aziz Naser, Dheer Charan Srivastav		08-12-2017
2018
Inspector Gullu	Aziz Naser	Adnan Sajid Khan, Aziz Naser		16-02-2018
Bhoot Bhaijaan	Habib Naseer	Aziz Naser, Adnan Sajid Khan		15-06-2018
08 November Croadpati	Saradh Reddy	Adnan Sajid Khan, Aziz Naser, Akbar bin Tabar	Comedy	03-08-2018
Colour Photo	Aziz Naser	Adnan Sajid Khan, Aziz Naser	Comedy	23-11-2018
2019
Hyderabad Nawabs 2	Aziz Naser, R. K.	Adnan Sajid Khan, Aziz Naser, Ali Reza, R.K. Farha Khan	Comedy	19-07-2019
2021
Bolo Hau	Tarun Dhanrajgir	Adnan Sajid Khan, Jahnavi Dhanrajgir, Preeti Nigam, Ankit Rathi	Romance	15-01-2021
