= Deccani Masnavi =

Indian poem

Deccani Masnavi (Deccani: دکنی مثنوی; dakkʰinī mat̲h̲nawī) is the name of the poem written in rhyming couplets in Deccani Urdu. It originated during the Bahmani Sultanate of Deccan (now South India) in the early 14th century. The use of grammar and meter are similar with Masnavi of Urdu language.

== List of Deccani Masnavi ==
Following are the collection of available Deccani Masnavi of the 14th century.

- Kadam Rao Padam Rao, 4000 lines first recorded Deccani Masnavi composed by Fakhruddin Nizami of Bidar during 1421-1434 AD.
- Laila Majnun, composed by Shaikh Ahmed Gujrati in between 1580-1588 AD.
- Yousuf Zulaikha, composed by Shaikh Ahmed Gujrati in between 1580-1588 AD.
- Qutb Mushtar, composed by Mullah Wajhi in 1608 AD.
- PhulBan, composed by Muhammad Mazharuddin Ibn Nishati in 1656 AD.
