= Deccani literature =

Literature produced in Deccani Urdu

Deccani literature (Urdu: ادبیات دكهنى, “Adbiyāt-i-Dakhni Urdū”) is the literature produced in the Deccani language. The earliest forms of Deccani literature are in the form of Sufi and Bhakti texts with poetic genres. The timeline of Deccani literature is divided into two periods: medieval (1300–1800) and modern (after 1800). Though Medieval Deccani literature consists of Mathnawi it also has various genres, including works of "Fakhruddin Nizami" Kadam Rao Padam Rao (1434 AD), Deccani Masnavi originated during the Bahmani Sultanate of the Deccan in the early 14th and 15th century; they are written in rhyming couplets in Deccani, the use of grammar and meter similar with Masnavi of Urdu language.

In the late 15th and early 16th century, after the Bahmani Sultanate disintegrated into the Deccan Sultanates, the Deccani literary tradition was largely developed and became concentrated at Golconda and Bijapur. Numerous Deccani poets were patronized during this time. According to Shaheen and Shahid, Golconda was the literary home of Asadullah Wajhi (author of Sab Ras), ibn-e-Nishati (Phulban), and Ghwasi (Tutinama). Bijapur played host to Hashmi Bijapuri, San‘ati, and Mohammed Nusrati over the years. The rulers themselves participated in these cultural developments. Muhammad Quli Qutb Shah of the Golconda Sultanate wrote poetry in Deccani, which was compiled into a Kulliyat. It is widely considered to be the earliest Deccani Urdu poetry of a secular nature. and Lazzat Un Nisa, a book compiled in the 16th century at Qutb Shahi courts contains secret medicines and stimulants in the eastern form of ancient sexual arts. Ibrahim Adil Shah II of the Bijapur Sultanate produced Kitab-e-Navras (Book of the Nine Rasas), a work of musical poetry written entirely in Deccani. In 18the century a collection of Urdu Ghazal poetry, named Gulzar-e-Mahlaqa, authored by Mah Laqa Bai—the first female Urdu poet to produce a Diwan—was published in Hyderabad.

== Bibliography ==
- Dua, Hans R. (2012), "Hindi-Urdu as a pluricentric language", in Michael Clyne (ed.), Pluricentric Languages: Differing Norms in Different Nations, Walter de Gruyter, ISBN 978-3-11-088814-0
- Rahman, Tariq (2011), From Hindi to Urdu: A Social and Political History (PDF), Oxford University Press, ISBN 978-0-19-906313-0, archived from the original (PDF) on 10 October 2014
- Mustafa, K.S (2008), "Dakkhni", in Prakāśaṃ, Vennelakaṇṭi (ed.), Encyclopaedia of the Linguistic Sciences: Issues and Theories, Allied Publishers, pp. 185–186, ISBN 978-1139465502
- Shaheen, Shagufta; Shahid, Sajjad (2018), "The Unique Literary Traditions of Dakhnī", in Azam, Kousar J (ed.), Languages and Literary Cultures in Hyderabad, Routledge, ISBN 9781351393997
- Matthews, David J. (1976). Dakani Language and Literature (Thesis). SOAS University of London.
