= Biryani Aur Haleem =

2012 Indian comedy play

- Original language: Hyderabadi Urdu
- Written by: Team Sutradhar
- Characters: Salim and Javed; Pasha Bi; Ismail bhai
- Genre: Comedy
- Setting: Hyderabad Old City

Premiere
- Date: November 2011
- Place: Hyderabad, India

Biryani Aur Haleem is a slapstick comedy play written by Team Sutradhar, directed by Deepti Girotra and Mohit Jaiswal. is based on the English play, The Pie and The Tart by Hugh Chesterman, an English play with French setting. It was produced by a theatre group called Sutradhar.

It is a 45-minute play, on the life two beggars, Salim and Javed, set in old Hyderabad city and its unique Hyderabadi language. Deepti, the director, also did the popular role of Pasha Bi in the play with her Deccani lehja.

== Plot ==
The play starts with a monologue by Javed, one of the two beggars and quickly takes the form of a dialogue with the entry of his partner in mischief, Salim. The two beggars meet on the street. They meet at a place and go over the happenings with each other. On that day, Salim goes begging to the home of well-known cook, Ismail Bhai (Rahim Aamir Ali Lalani). And also meet his wife, Pasha Bi (Deepti Girotra) and get a good thrashing from her.

Ismail is invited by a Nawaab to demonstrate his culinary skills and make the best Hyderabadi biryani and haleem and bring it over. He is desperate for money and out to impress the Nawaab, he prepares a special Biryani and haleem and tells his wife, Pasha Bi, to hand it over to the delivery boy he would send. She is told that he recites a poem (sher) for her to recognize him. The delivery plan is overheard by Salim, the beggar, who is outside the cook's home. He calls over Javed and gives him new clothes and tells him to go as the delivery boy and recite the sher to Pasha Bi, to get the biryani and haleem pack. The plan works and successfully dupe Pasha Bi and eat the entire Biryani meant to be delivered to the Nawaab. The cook realises and catches the beggars.

The play ends with the dialogue, Gaye the Bheek Maangne Javed aur Saleem, lekhar aagaye Biryani aur Haleem.

The popular segment in the play is Pasha Bi's 2-minute, non-stop dialogue scolding the beggar, Salim, in Hyderabadi Urdu is loved by the audiences.

== Cast ==
- Deepti Girotra as Pasha Bi. The director of the play, enacted this role and critically acclaimed.
- Rahim Aamir Ali Lalani as Ismail bhai
- Sattya Bhagat Reddy as Salim (beggar)
- Ahmed Quraishi as Javed (beggar)

The caption of the play reads Pasha Bi ka kudkudaana, Ismail bhai ka chidchidaana, Salim ka joote Khaana, Javed ka topi pinaana

== Reception ==
The play was received overwhelmingly by the audience and critically acclaimed by the critics. It is staged at Chowmahalla Palace and regularly several times in film festivals and other centers across India.

The roles played with a typical Hyderabadi behaviour and language is well received by the audience. It also had subtle dialogues on social, political issues are a hit among the audience.

- Deccan Chronicle described the play as "The laugh-a-minute" play highly entertains the audience who are in splits throughout..."
- The Times of India wrote "The laughter is evoked from the audience stayed on till the end of the evening..."
- The Hindu reviewed "Their comic timing was impeccable which was evident when the audience was in splits every few seconds..."
