= Aziz Naser =

Indian actor

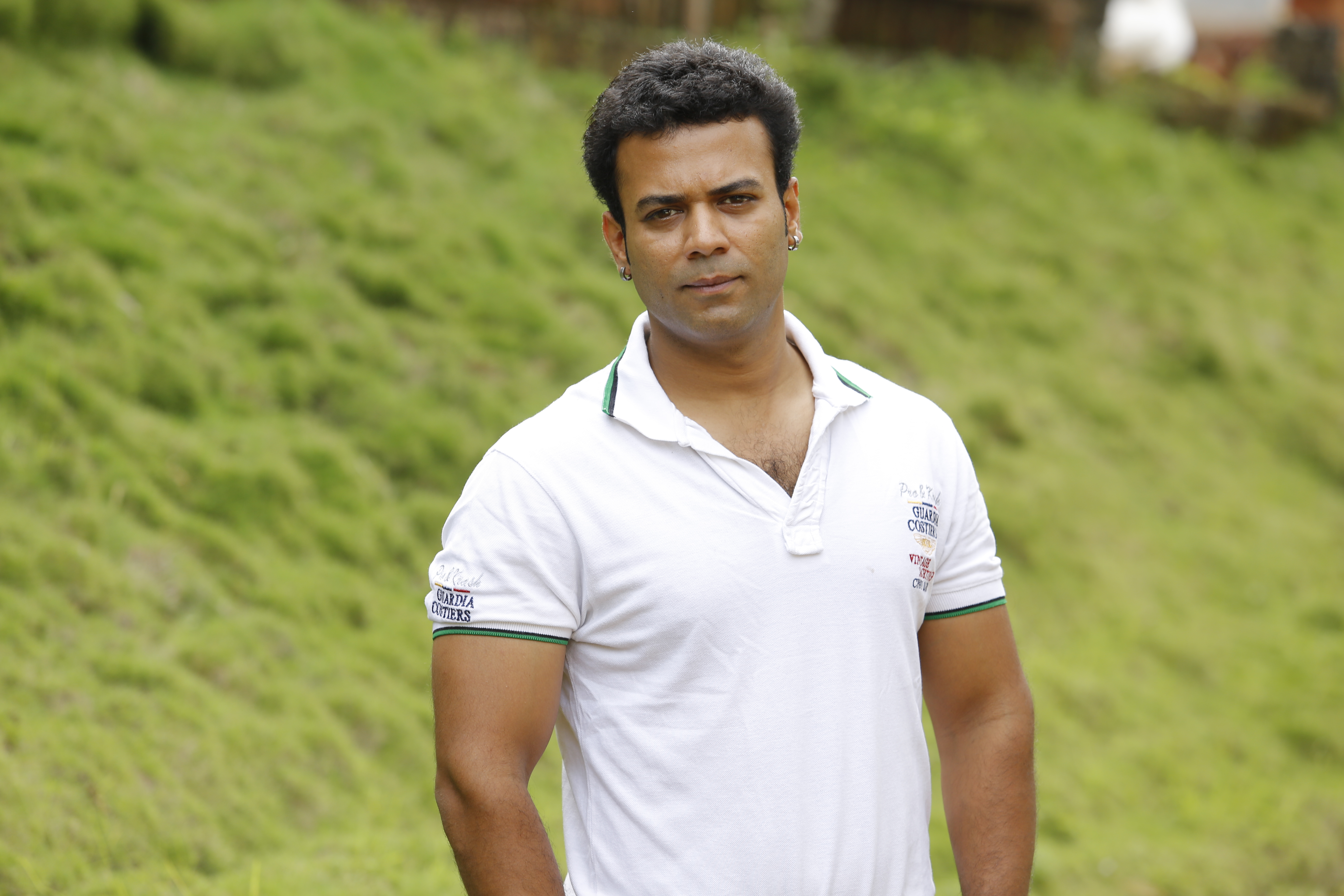
- Born: 23 December 1980 (age 45)
- Occupations: Actor; Voice Artist; screenwriter

Aziz Naser (born Aziz Janbaz) is an Indian actor, writer and a voice artist who works in Deccani and Telugu films. He worked in Hyderabadi films such as The Angrez and Hyderabad Nawabs. As a dubbing artist, he lent his voice for Sonu Sood, Nana Patekar, Kelly Dorjee, Aditya Pancholi, Rahul Dev and other Hindi film actors who featured in Telugu films.

== Career ==
Aziz Naser left his job in Dubai to pursue a career in films starting with The Angrez (2005).

He has worked in more than 40 films in Deccani, Hindi, Telugu and Marathi. In 2015 he made his Telugu debut in movie Jyothi Lakshmi. In 2022, he made his debut in Marathi with the movie Stepney-Tumchaakde aahe na..? as an actor, writer and director.

== Filmography ==
=== Deccani films ===
Year	Title	Role	Notes
2005	The Angrez	Jahangir	Also asst director, Hindi dialogues
2006	Hyderabad Nawabs	Pappu	Also dialogue and story Writer
2007	Hungama in Dubai	Mujju	
2007	FM Fun Aur Masti	Johnny	Also dialogue writer
2008	Thriller – The Movie	Sanju	Also writer and director
2010	Gullu Dada Returns: No Compromise.. Only Fight...!	Aziz / Ajju	Also additional dialogue and director
2010	Berozgaar	Nawab	Also writer and director
2011	Zabardast	Ajju	Also writer and director
2011	Ja Bhai Ja		Cameo
2013	Gullu Dada 3	Amir	
2013	Ek tha Sardar	Ghafoor	
2013	Gullu Dada 4	Sajid	
2014	Stepney – Everyone needs one	Aziz	Also writer and director
2016	Dawat E Shaadi	Abbas	Also dialogue writer
2016	Dubai Return	Feroz	Also dialogue writer and director
2017	Salaam Zindagi	Irfan	Also writer
2017	127B	Eddie	
2018	Inspector Gullu	Ajju	Also writer and director
2018	Colour Photo	Arif Aurangabadi	Also writer and director
2019	Hyderabad Nawabs 2	Pappu	Also dialogue writer and co-director

=== Telugu films ===
Year	Title	Role	Notes
2015	Jyothi Lakshmi	Pandu	
2016	Premikudu	Satya	
2019	iSmart Shankar	CM'S man	
2021	Dirty Hari	CI Aziz	
2021	Check	Jailguard Katamayya	
2021	Wild Dog	Car Driver	Cameo appearance
2021	Romantic	Inspector Badani	
2022	Tees Maar Khan	SI	
2023	Prema Vimanam	Ajju	
2023	Malli Pelli	C.I	
2024	Viswam	Massod	
2024	Zebra	RP	
2025	Paanch Minar	Contract Killer	
2026	Cheekatilo	Irfan	

=== Hindi films ===
Year	Title	Role	Notes
2012	Siyaah	Cop	Also writer and director
2013	Calapor	Kishan (Jailguard)	
2016	Tiger Sultan	C.I Jani	
2017	Shaadi Express	Raj	
2018	Bhoot Bhaijaan	Rohit Sharma	
2018	08 November Roadpati	Mukhtar	

=== Other language films ===
Year	Title	Role	Language	Notes
2016	Killing Veerappan	Shashi	Kannada	
2022	Stepney - Tumchaakde aahe na..?	Deva	Marathi	Also story writer and director

== As a dubbing artist ==
Year	Title	Artist	Notes
2003	Ong-Bak	Theatrical Trailer	in English/Hindi
2009	Siddham	Mukul Dev	Dubbed character: Bilal Khan
2009	Ek Niranjan	Makarand Deshpande	Also theatrical trailer voiceover in English
2010	Vedam	Manoj Bajpai	Dubbed character: Rahimuddin Qureshi
2010	Golimaar	Shawar Ali	Dubbed character: Talwar
2010	Rakta Charitra	Sudeep	Telugu version
2010	Adhurs	Mukul Dev	Dubbed character: Rasool
2011	Badrinath	Kelly Dorjee	Dubbed character: Sarkar
2011	Shakti	Sonu Sood	Dubbed character: Mukthar
2011	Dookudu	Sonu Sood	Dubbed character: Nayak
2011	Nenu Naa Rakshasi	Abhimanyu Singh, Mukhtar Khan	Dubbed character: Ratna
2011	Oosaravelli	Vidyut Jamwal	Dubbed character: Irfan
2012	Dammu	Rahul Dev	Dubbed for an unnamed police officer
2012	Nippu	Mukul Dev	Dubbed character: Shankar Kaka
2012	Daruvu	Sushant Singh	Dubbed character: Harbour Babu
2013	Naayak	Rahul Dev, Dev Gill, Ajaz Khan	Dubbed trio: Babji, Badwel, and Taxi Seth
2013	Baadshah	Kelly Dorjee	Dubbed character: Sadhu Bhai
2013	Shadow	Aditya Pancholi	Dubbed character: Nana Bhai
2013	The Attacks of 26/11	Nana Patekar	Telugu dubbed version
2013	Dalam	Abhimanyu Singh	Dubbed character: Ladda
2013	Iddarammayilatho	Shawar Ali	Dubbed character: Shawar Ali
2014	Heart Attack	Vikramjeet Virk	Dubbed character: Makarand Kamati
2014	Loukyam	Rahul Dev	Dubbed character: Sathya
2014	1: Nenokkadine	Kelly Dorjee	Dubbed character: Anthony Rosario
2015	Rey	Arpit Ranka	Dubbed character: Dange
2015	Jadoogadu	Zakir Hussain	Dubbed character: Srisailam
2015	Pandaga Chesko	Abhimanyu Singh	Dubbed character: Shankar
2016	Attack	Abhimanyu Singh	Dubbed character: Satthu
2016	Eedo Rakam Aado Rakam	Abhimanyu Singh	Dubbed character: Gajendra alias Gaja
2016	Shankara	John Vijay	Dubbed character: ACP Prasad
2017	Khaidi No. 150	Tarun Arora	Dubbed character: Agarwal
2017	Katamarayudu	Tarun Arora	Dubbed character: Yelasari Bhanu
2017	Oxygen	Abhimanyu Singh	Dubbed character: Chalapathi
2017	Jai Lava Kusa	Ronit Roy	Dubbed character: Sarkar
2018	Inttelligent	Rahul Dev, Dev Gill	Dubbed characters: Vicky Bhai, Dina
2018	Touch Chesi Chudu	Shahbaz Khan, Freddy Daruwala	Dubbed characters: Irfan, Rauf
2018	Naa Peru Surya	Thakur Anoop Singh	Dubbed character: Adi
2018	Devadas	Kunal Kapoor	Dubbed character: David
2018	The Villain	Sudeep	Telugu dubbed version
2018	Amar Akbar Anthony	Abhimanyu Singh	Dubbed character: Balwant Kharge
2018	Maari 2	Tovino Thomas	Telugu dubbed version
2019	Vinaya Vidheya Rama	Mahesh Manjrekar	Dubbed character: Prabhunath
2019	Saaho	Chunky Pandey, Arun Vijay	Telugu version
2019	Sye Raa Narasimha Reddy	Oscar Skagerberg	Dubbed character: Jackson
2019	Chanakya	Upen Patel	Dubbed character: Sohail Qureshi
2019	Sita	Abhimanyu Singh	Dubbed character: Mukesh Murari
2020	Kanulu Kanulanu Dochayante	Gautham Vasudev Menon	Telugu dubbed version
2020	Nishabdham	R. Madhavan	Dubbed character: Anthony Gonsalves
2021	Check	Rohit Pathak	Dubbed character: Trigger
2021	Wild Dog	Bilal Hossein	Dubbed character: Khalid Bhatkal
2021	Romantic	Makarand Deshpande, Ravi Awana	Dubbed characters: Samson, Aziz Nazir
2021	Seetimaarr	Tarun Arora	Dubbed character: CI Makhan Singh
2021	Ghani	Sunil Shetty	Dubbed character: Vijayendra Sinha
2021	Money Heist	Pedro Alonso	for Berlin; Telugu dubbed version
2022	Hero	Ravi Kishan	Dubbed character: Salim Savyasachi
2022	Godfather	Nawab Shah	Dubbed character: Abdul
2022	Sita Ramam	Jisshu Sengupta	Dubbed character: Akbar
2023	Agent	Denzel Smith	Dubbed character: Abhijeet Mehta
2023	Ugram	Nawab Shah	Dubbed character: Bhatia
2023	Spy	Makarand Deshpande, Jisshu Sengupta	Dubbed characters: Shastri, Abdul Rahman
2023	Bhola Shankar	Tarun Arora, Shawar Ali	Dubbed characters: Alexander, Charles
2023	Devil: The British Secret Agent	Mark Bennington	Dubbed character: Bracken
2023	Ramabanam	Tarun Arora	Dubbed character: GK
2023	Kranti	Tarun Arora	Telugu dubbed version
2024	Eagle	Nitin Mehta	Dubbed character: Rajesh Rumani
2024	Raajadhani Files	Vishal Patni	Dubbed character: Unnamed CM
2024	Operation Valentine	Vaibhav Tatwawadi	Telugu version
2024	Razakar	Makarand Deshpande	Dubbed character: Usman Ali Khan
2024	Kalki 2898 AD		
2024	Double iSmart	Makarand Deshpande	Dubbed character: Thomas
2024	Tiragabadara Saami	Makarand Deshpande	Dubbed character: Kondareddy
2025	Sankranthiki Vasthunam	Mahesh Balaraj	Dubbed character: Bijju Pandey
2025	Chhaava	Akshaye Khanna	Telugu dubbed version
2025	Hari Hara Veera Mallu	Bobby Deol	Dubbed character: Aurangzeb

== See also ==
- Mast Ali
