= Adrak Ke Punjey =

Indian satirical play by Babban Khan

- Original language: Hyderabadi (Dakhani) Dakhini
- Written by: Babban Khan
- Characters: Rumsu, BeePasha, Nawab Saheb, Gowli (milkman) and others
- Genre: Comedy

Premiere
- Date: 22nd of September 1965
- Place: Hyderabad, India

Adrak Ke Punjey is an Indian satirical play written by Babban Khan that ran from 1965 to 2001. The Guinness Book of World Records mentioned it in 1984 as the world's longest-running one man show. The play is a mixture of Urdu and Dakhani.

== Synopsis ==
The protagonist is Ramsu, a Hyderabadi with a wife and several children, trying to make ends meet and incurring heavy debts while doing so. Ramsu is played by the author himself. The comedy revolves around how Rumsu deals with friends and acquaintances from whom he has borrowed small sums of money to manage his family. Ramsu's wife is Bipasha who is troubled with her husband's low income and often complains about not being able to manage household and demands for either food grains or a saree for herself. The response from Ramsu earns chuckles. The drama ends with a message to follow family planning and have minimum children. It promotes "small family happy family" concept "chota parivar sukhi parivar" of the family planning department.

== History ==
Babban Khan is from a middle-class family. Although a graduate, he was jobless. He faced heavy challenges to make both ends meet. Oldies in Hyderabad still remember his bad times very fondly "ek piyali chai pe bechara ek lateefa sunata tha bhai" he used to tell a joke and would accept a cup of tea. One day he scripted Adrak Ke Panje sitting under a lamppost and staged the very first show on 22 September 1965. To meet the theatre and advertisement expenses Khan had to sell his mother's "laccha" (a gold ornament worn by only married Indian women) for rupees 275. Out of which he paid 200 rupees to Ravindra Bharathi (the theatre), paid 35 rupees to print tickets for the show and gave the rest to this mother for "ration".

Before Adrak Ke Panje happened, Babban was a normal man on the street trying to eke out an existence for himself and his siblings. Adrak Ke Panje got written under the streetlights of Hyderabad in Agapura. In fact his life almost reads like a film story: Here was a man with no money who writes a comedy under the streetlights and then pawns his mother's mangalsutra to rent a hall and put up the play. On 22 September 1965, Adrak Ke Panje was staged for the first time. It was a massive flop, but a good samaritan came backstage later and gave him Rs 500 to continue with the show. The play was a resounding success and won accolades from all.

The story of Adrak is borne out of the story of Babban. His parents were unaware of family planning. The result was that three brothers and four sisters died due to malnutrition and lack of proper medical care. In fact, Babban's parents refused to name him till he was 10 just in case he died too!. Written way back in 1965, Adrak is based on the theme of family planning. It is in the form of a one-man piece enacted by Babban himself. What makes the play popular was the comic note which transcends all barriers of time and place

== Longest running one-man show ==
Adrak ke Panje is also the longest running one-man show, entered the Guinness Book of World Records in 1984, by then the drama had already completed 10 thousand shows. The play has been seen by an estimated 3 crore (30 million) people across 60 countries and in 27 different languages across the globe. The drama has surpassed Agatha Christie's The Mousetrap and Chorus Line having around 7-8 thousand shows The show was played from 22 September 1965 to 11 February 2001.

Besides a mention in the Guinness Book of World Records in 1984 for the longest one-man show, this play has been seen by an estimated three crore people, staged in 60 countries around the globe, 25 cities in USA and 65 cities and towns in India. This has been the first play in the country to be computerised and translated into 27 foreign languages. What's more, this one-man show has run parallel to Dustin Hoffman's in New York and Khan's autographs have appeared in the Washington auditorium along with Michael Jackson and Frank Sinatra. The one-man show has travelled to over 60 countries in a span of 35 years. But after all these awe-inspiring statistics, Adrak Ke Panje and its creator Babban Khan have decided to ring down the curtains on the play.

== Etymology ==
Adrak means Ginger and Panje means its offshoot. As ginger has many irregular offshoots, so does Rumsu's (Babban Khan) children in the drama—without any family planning.

== Early life ==
Babban Khan's parents refused to name him till he was 10, fearing his death as his brothers and sisters had died earlier out of malnutrition—a result of penury running in the family. He hails from Aghapura. Attained wealth, fame and recognition through hard work and commitment and a strong zeal to succeed in life. The man is known to be very humble and now lives in Shanti Nager area of Hyderabad.

== Babban Khan Acting Academy ==
Babban khan now runs acting academy in Hyderabad, India and admits only 8 students per year. He trains them personally and awards them a certificate of acting from Babban Khan's Academy

== The last show ==
The last show of Adrak Ke Panje was on 11 February 2001, completing 10,180 shows in a span of 35 years.

== Next Show ==
Babban Khan, who grew up in penury and scripted Adrak-ke-Panje under a streetlight, presently is also busy giving final touches to a sequel to the hugely popular serial. Then there is a new play Gumbad-ke-Kabutar, which is almost ready to hit the stage. Poking fun at corruption in the day-to-day life, Gumbad-ke-Kabutar is scheduled to make a debut around June. He refuses to reveal details about the play except adding with a wink, "just wait for the show. You will enjoy it".

== Snippets ==
(1) Audience clap for continuously 16 minutes in New York (2) The sherwani used in the drama is still the same, stitched by his tailor in exchange of two free tickets for the very first show!

Babban Khan's drama has preserved a part of life existing in Hyderabad in 1960's, with no options to secure a government job educated youth used to wander in search of a livelihood day in day out. The drama clearly portrays characters that were existing in Hyderabad in those days, such as Nawab Saab his house owner, who comes to collect his 8 months rent which is due on Ramsu. While arguing for money, Nawab Saab boasts of having an unani formula that would earn him a handsome money he calls it Khamira Gouzubaa a popular tonic for enhancing mental capabilities or memory. The drama is full of punches in typical Hyderabadi Urdu.
