= Pem Nem =

16th-century Bijapur manuscript

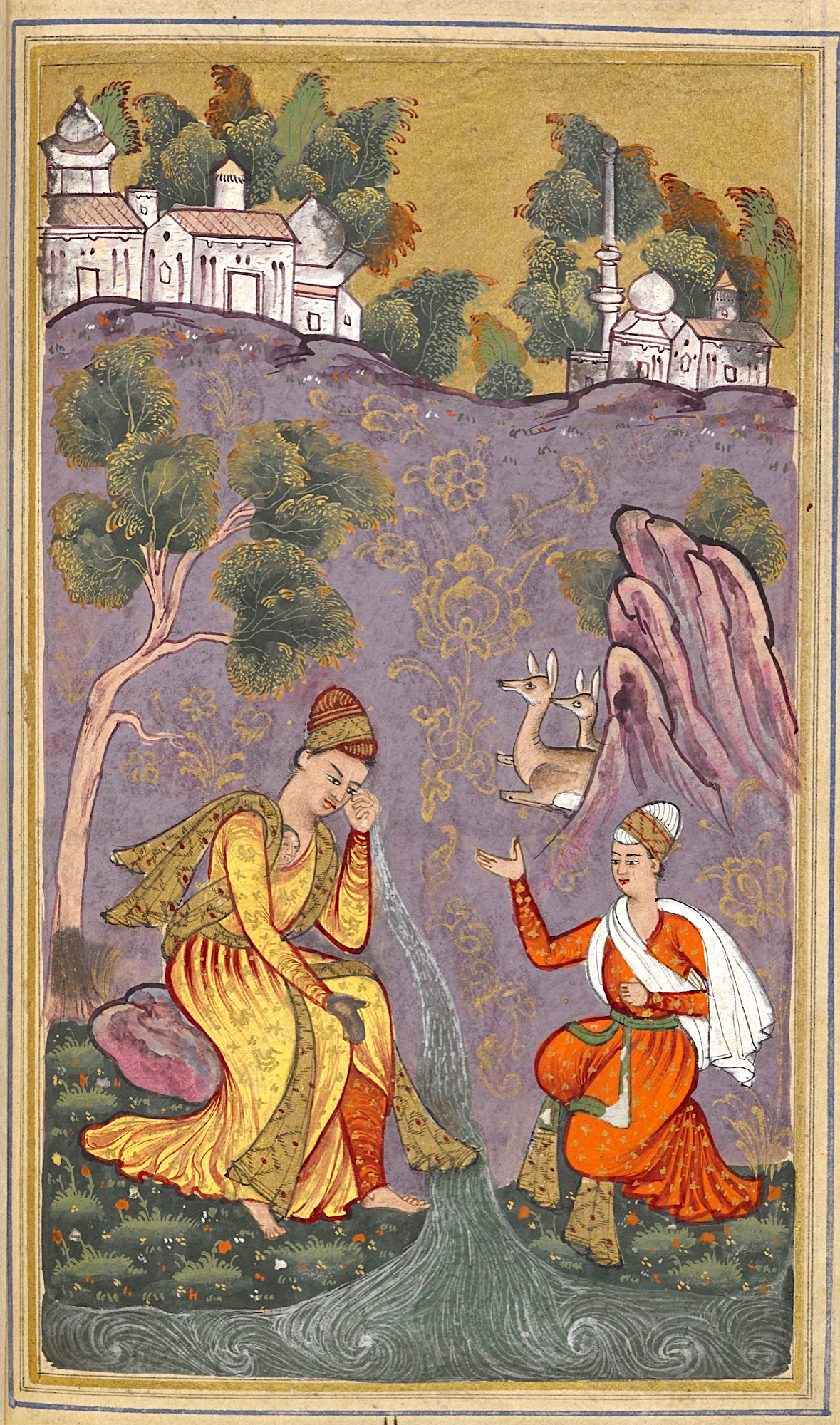
Convinced that Mah Ji is only a reflection of the image in his heart, he weeps a stream of tears

Pem Nem (lit. 'The Rules of Love') is a 16th-century manuscript commissioned at the court of the Bijapur Sultanate. It belongs to the Prem Marg genre of Sufi literature, where a love story forms a metaphor representing the quest for the union with God. Written in an early form of Dakhni, it is a mathnawi, a long narrative poem written in rhyming couplets.

The only surviving copy of the manuscript, containing 239 folios, is situated in the British Library. It is richly illustrated, with thirty-four paintings in the Bijapur school of Deccan art.

== Background ==
The author is Hasan Manju Khalji, bearing the pen name of Hans. While he does not explicitly name his patron, the sections dedicated to praises of Ibrahim Adil Shah II and the city of Bijapur make its provenance clear.

The author gives the date of the compilation as 999 Hijri. However, this date is likely inaccurate, and may have been chosen for its numeric symbology. In the introduction, the suburb of Nauraspur is mentioned, which was established in 1599. Furthermore, the mention of Ibrahim's musical talents and achievements also points to a later date, since he would have been only nineteen years old in 1590.

== Plot ==
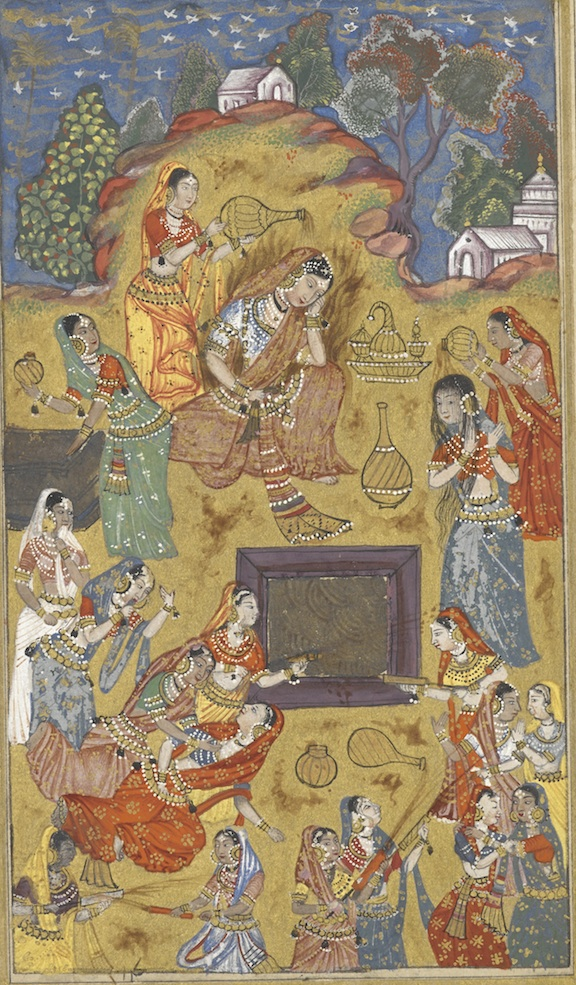
Flames of unrequited passion arise from Mahji as she mourns for her lost beloved

The lovers in the story are Shah Ji, the prince of Kuldip, and Mah Ji, the princess of an island called Sangaldip. They fall in love after a turtle reveals to them each other's images. Shah Ji leaves his kingdom and undertakes an arduous journey, travelling across the ocean in search of his beloved.

Upon reaching the island of Sangaldip, he meets with the king, who happens to be his paternal uncle. He faints when the princess is brought in front of him. However, Shah Ji has begun to regard the image of Mah Ji that he carries around in his heart as the reality and the princess herself as an illusion. Thus, he leaves the palace, in search of the truth through contemplation. This contemplation lasts for one year, and Mah Ji is left pining for her lover.

After a year, Shah Ji realizes that Mah Ji was not a reflection, and returns to the island. He meets with the king, and the lovers reunite, the union of the lovers serving as a metaphor for the union of the soul with God. Finally, they are married.

== Illustrations ==
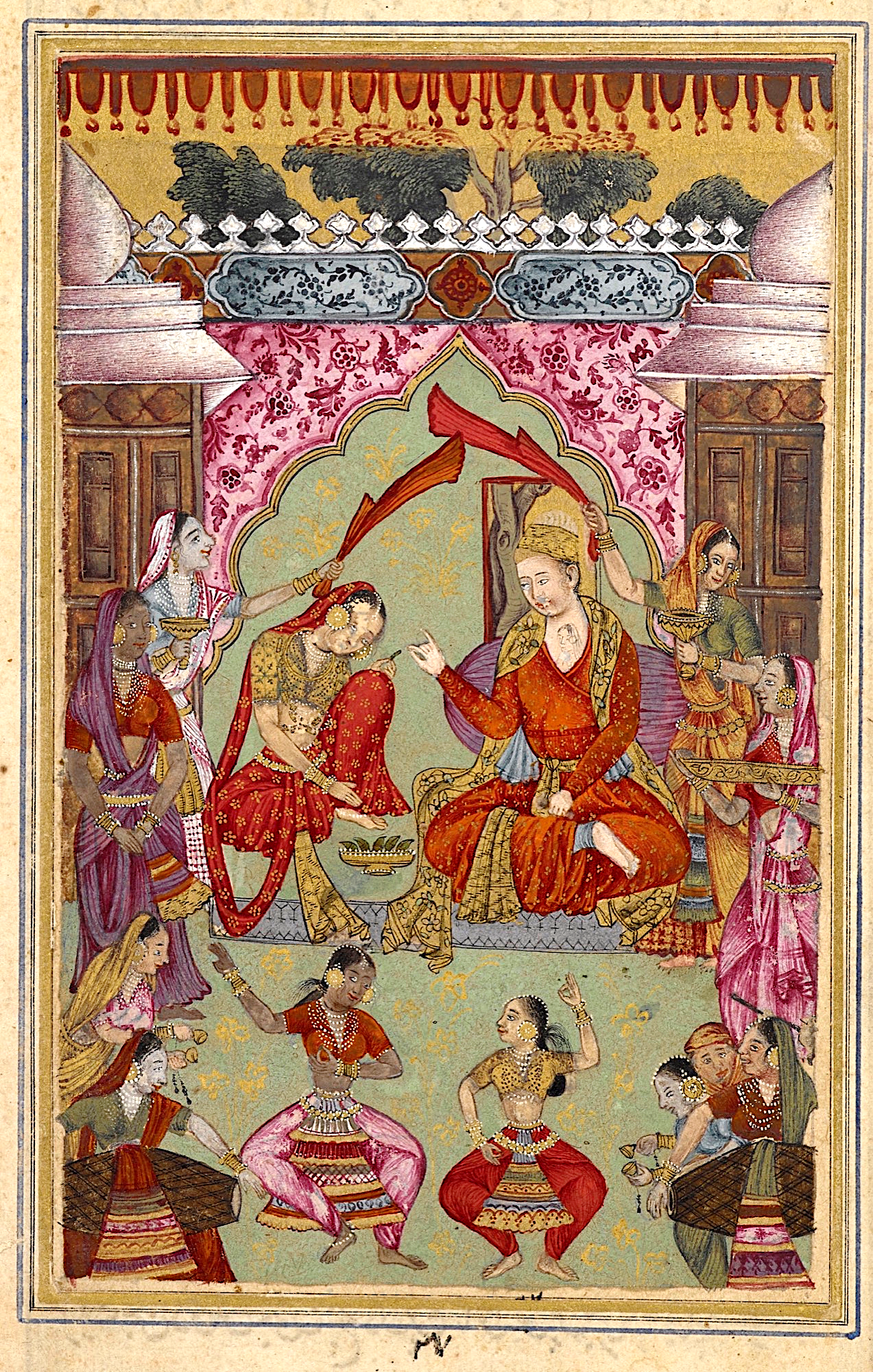
8 Hand A (The Dublin Painter). The lovers are now united in marriage, and Mah Ji offers Shah Ji paan. Pem Nem, Hasan Manju Khalji 1591(BL Add.16680, f. 232r)

There are thirty-four illustrations, mostly full-page, done by three different artists. These were not painted directly onto the folios of the manuscript; rather, they were painted on separate pieces of paper and then pasted onto the folios.

The most obvious visual metaphor is the depiction of Mah Ji's image on Shah Ji's chest, meant to convey that she has become a part of him. It is a representation of dhikr.

In most modern scholarship, the three artists are referred to as hand A, hand B, and hand C respectively. The first two have painted fifteen illustrations each, while only four are attributed to hand C.

== Bibliography ==
- Hutton, Deborah (2011). "The Pem Nem: A Sixteenth Century Illustrated Romance from Bijapur". Sultans of the South: Arts of India's Deccan Courts, 1323-1687. Metropolitan Museum of Art. pp. 44–63. ISBN 978-1-58839-438-5.
- Hashmi, Arshad Masood (2020). پیم نیم: سولہویں صدی کی ایک غیر مطبوع بیجاپوری مثنوی [Pem Nem: An unpublished 16th-century Bijapuri mathnawi]. Fikr-O-Tahqeeq (in Urdu). 23 (3). National Council for promotion of Urdu language.
- Munshi, Neha. A journey of longing - the art of courtly romance in Bijapur.
- Matthews, David. "Pem Nem: A 16th Century Dakani Manuscript". From Cairo to Kabul: Afghan and Islamic Studies presented to Ralph Pinder-Wilson.
