= FM Fun Aur Masti =

- Poster
- Directed by: Sekhar Surya
- Screenplay by: Sekhar Surya
- Dialogues by: Aziz Naser; Salman Hyder
- Story by: RK; Sekhar Surya
- Produced by: RK; Dorai Swamy
- Starring: Aziz Naser; Payal Sarkar; Kautilya; Monica Nouva; RK; Adnan Sajid Khan
- Cinematography: Parthipan G.
- Edited by: Nandamuri Hari
- Music by: Sheikh Elani
- Production companies: Touchstone Productions; Utopia Entertainers
- Release date: 16 November 2007
- Country: India
- Language: Dakhini

FM (Fun Aur Masti) is a 2007 Indian Hyderabadi-language comedy film directed by Sekhar Surya and starring Aziz Naser, Payel Sarkar, Adnan Sajid Khan (in his debut), Kautilya, Monica Nouva and RK. The character Gullu Dada was well received and Adnan Sajid Khan went on to play the character in other films.

== Cast ==
- Aziz Naser as Johnny
- Payel Sarkar as Rosy
- Kautilya as Hussain
- Monica Nouva as Neha
- RK as David
- Satya Krishnan as David's wife
- Mumaith Khan in an item number in "Ee Jalwa"
- Adnan Sajid Khan as Gullu Dada
- Ayesha Jaleel as Johnny's mother
- Chitram Basha as Thief
- Venu Yeldandi as beggar
- Akbar Bin Tabar
- Dhanraj Koranani as tea stall owner
- Azam Shafi as Anwar
- Ambati Srinivas as Auto Driver (uncredited)

== Reception ==
A critic from Sify wrote that "Smeared with its peculiar Hindi dialect mixed with Urdu, the film holds out decent comedy for its target audience".

== See also ==
- Deccani cinema
