= Mast Ali =

Indian actor and dialogue writer (born 1980)

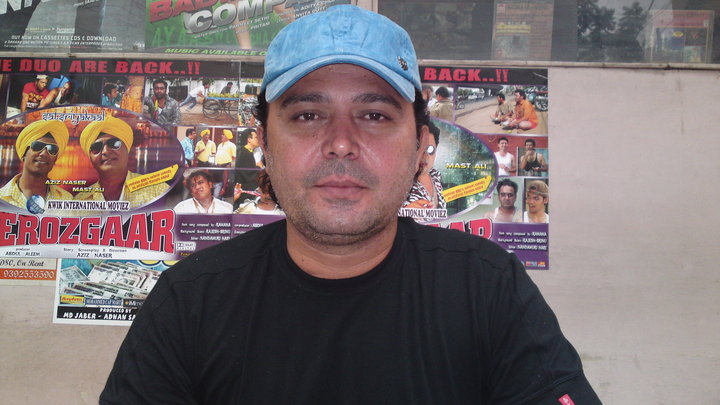
- Born: Ali Asghar Tayabi; 1970 (age 55–56); Hyderabad, Andhra Pradesh (now in Telangana), India
- Occupations: Actor, dialogue writer
- Years active: 2001–present

Mast Ali (born 1970) is an Indian actor who works primarily in Telugu and Deccani films. He is best known for his works in The Angrez (2005), Hyderabad Nawabs (2006), Hungama in Dubai (2007) and Surya vs Surya (2015)

== Filmography ==
| Year | Title | Role | Language | Notes |
|---|---|---|---|---|
| 2001 | Kushi | Roadside Romeo | Telugu | Uncredited role |
| 2005 | The Angrez | Saleem Pheku | Deccani | |
| 2006 | Hyderabad Nawabs | Munna | Deccani | |
| 2007 | Hungama in Dubai | Ajju | Deccani | |
| 2008 | Hyderabadi Bakra | | Deccani | |
| 2009 | Kirkit | | Deccani | Lyricist |
| 2009 | Half Fry | Sahil | Deccani | |
| 2010 | Berozgaar | Baba | Deccani | |
| 2011 | Zabardast | Laddoo | Deccani | |
| 2011 | Mogudu | | Telugu | |
| 2013 | Pusthakamlo Konni Pageelu Missing | Saleem | Telugu | |
| 2013 | Paisa Potti Problem | Saleem | Deccani | |
| 2014 | Santray | Saleem | Deccani | |
| 2015 | Surya vs Surya | Zin Zuber | Telugu | |
| 2015 | Subramanyam for Sale | Asgar | Telugu | |
| 2015 | The Angrez 2 | Saleem Pheku | Deccani | |
| 2015 | Ram Robert Raheem | Robert / Raheem Khan / Sairam | Deccani | Triple role |
| 2016 | Apna Hyderabad | | Deccani | |
| 2016 | Dawat E Shaadi | Mastan | Deccani | |
| 2016 | Hyderabadi Pheku | Amjad Khan | Deccani | |
| 2016 | Babu Bangaram | Thief | Telugu | Cameo appearance |
| 2016 | Tiger Sultan | Sallu | Deccani | |
| 2017 | 127B | Lakhan Singh "Lucky" | Deccani | |
| 2017 | Salaam Zindagi | | Deccani | |
| 2017 | Shaadi Express | | Deccani | |
| 2019 | Jai Veeru | Veeru | Bhojpuri | |
| 2020 | Eureka | Kareem | Telugu | |
| 2021 | Jathi Ratnalu | Bawarchi | Telugu | |
| 2023 | Narakasura | Constable Ali | Telugu | |
| 2024 | Vicky Vidya Ka Woh Wala Video | Badshah | Hindi | |
| 2024 | Ramnagar Bunny | | Telugu | |
| 2025 | Chaurya Paatham | Bablu Kumar | Telugu | |
| 2025 | Jigris | Bilal | Telugu | |

== See also ==
- Aziz Naser
