= Hungama in Dubai =

- Directed by: Masood Ali
- Written by: Masood Ali
- Produced by: Masood Ali
- Starring: Aziz Naser; Dheer Charan Srivastav; Mast Ali
- Music by: Premkumar S
- Release date: September 7, 2007 (India)
- Country: India
- Language: Deccani Urdu

Hungama in Dubai is a 2007 Indian Deccani comedy film directed by Masood Ali and starring Aziz Naser, Dheer Charan Srivastav, and Mast Ali in part of a series of movies based on the Hyderabadi lingo theme that followed The Angrez and Hyderabad Nawabs.

== Cast ==
- Aziz Naser as Mujju
- Dheer Charan Srivastav as Nawab Sahab
- Mast Ali as Ajju
- Matten Khan
- Sweta Khanduri as Nisha
- Hena as Sonia

== Reception ==
The Hindu reviewer praised the film, writing "Hungama In Dubai is the most entertaining comedy, I’ve ever seen. I might sound pompous and perhaps a bit hasty to make that judgement, but this film went beyond my expectations".
