= R. K. =

Indian actor

- Occupation: Actor
- Years active: 2002–present

Veeramachineni Ramakrishna, known professionally as R. K., is an Indian director, producer, screenwriter and actor who works in Deccan and Telugu cinema.

== Career ==
After making his debut with a minor role in the Telugu film Takkari Donga (2002), RK played the role of Mama in the Deccani film The Angrez (2005), which he also co-produced. He also worked as a producer for Hyderabad Nawabs (2006). He turned director with Hyderabad Nawabs 2 (2019).

== Filmography ==
Year	Film	Role	Language	Notes
2002	Takkari Donga		Telugu	Uncredited role
2004	Athade Oka Sainyam	Prakash Rao's goon	Telugu	
2005	The Angrez	Mama	Deccani	Also producer
2006	Hyderabad Nawabs	Gopal Yadav alias Mama	Deccani	Also producer
2007	FM Fun Aur Masti	David	Deccani	Also writer and producer
2008	Mallepuvvu	Construction site worker	Telugu	
2010	Andari Bandhuvaya	Jangaiah	Telugu	
2011	Inki Toh Aisi Ki Thaisi	Inspector	Deccani	
2011	Family Pack	Sarpanch	Deccani	
2011	Zabardast	Inspector	Deccani	
2011	Nuvvila	Thief	Telugu	
2012	Eega	Sudeep's colleague	Telugu; Tamil	Bilingual film
2013	Ek Tha Sardaar	Inspector	Deccani	
2014	Run Raja Run	CI Vasudev Sharma	Telugu	
2015	Thanu Nenu		Telugu	
2018	Inspector Gullu	Police Commissioner	Deccani	
2018	Inthalo Yennenni Vintalo		Telugu	
2019	Jai Veeru		Bhojpuri	
2019	Hyderabad Nawabs 2	Mama	Deccani	Also director, writer and producer
2019	Pyaar Karle	Inspector	Hindi	
2022	Virgin Story	Inspector	Hindi	
2023	Michael		Telugu	
2023	Slum Dog Husband	Inspector Balaram	Telugu	
2025	Solo Boy		Telugu	

=== Television ===
Year	Title	Role	Platform	Notes
2024	Save the Tigers	Pittala Srisailam	Disney+ Hotstar	season 2
