= Ghatikachalam =

2025 Indian Telugu-language film

- Theatrical release poster
- Directed by: Amar Kamepalli
- Screenplay by: Amar Kamepalli
- Story by: MC Raju
- Produced by: MC Raju
- Starring: Nikhil Devadula; Prabhakar Podakandla; Jogi Naidu; Aarvika Gupta; Samyuktha Kanumareddy
- Cinematography: SS Manoj
- Edited by: Srinivas Bainaboyina
- Music by: Flavio G. Cuccurullo
- Production company: Oasis Entertainment
- Release date: 31 May 2025
- Running time: 118 minutes
- Country: India
- Language: Telugu

Ghatikachalam is a 2025 Indian Telugu-language psychological horror film co-written and directed by Amar Kamepalli. It stars Nikhil Devadula, Prabhakar Podakandla, Jogi Naidu, Aarvika Gupta and Samyuktha Kanumareddy in important roles.

The film was released on 31 May 2025.

== Cast ==
- Nikhil Devadula as Kaushik
- Prabhakar Podakandla as Parashuram
- Jogi Naidu as Sudivelu
- Aarvika Gupta as Dr. Shraddha
- Samyuktha Kanumareddy as Samyu
- Devi as Ramadevi
- Tanmai as Eesha
- Arjun Vihaan as George
- Shan Kakkar as Panigrahi
- Rangadham as Ghatikachalam

== Music ==
The background score and soundtrack were composed by Flavio G. Cuccurullo.

Track listing
No.	Title	Lyrics	Singer(s)	Length
1.	"Prisoner Of Fate"	Flavio G. Cuccurullo	Ekaterina Shelehova	3:10

== Release and reception ==
Ghatikachalam was released on 31 May 2025. It was later released on Aha and Amazon Prime Video on 20 June 2025.

Bhargav Chaganti of NTV rated the film 2.5 out of 5 and appreciated Nikhil Devadula's performance. Aditya Devulapally of Cinema Express rated the film 2 out 5 and was critical towards poor editing, weak screenplay and narration.
