= Hyderabad Nawabs 2 =

Hyderabadi Nawabs 2
- Release poster
- Directed by: R.K.
- Written by: R.K. Aziz Naser (dialogues)
- Produced by: R.K.
- Starring: Ali Reza; Aziz Naser; R.K.
- Cinematography: Vasu
- Edited by: NTR
- Music by: Rajesh SS
- Release date: 19 July 2019
- Country: India
- Languages: Urdu; Telugu

Hyderabad Nawabs 2: estraight Dil Se.. is a 2019 Indian Hyderabadi-language film directed by R.K. and starring Aziz Naser, Ali Reza, and R.K. The film is a sequel to Hyderabad Nawabs (2006).

== Cast ==
- Ali Reza as Munna. This role was played by Mast Ali in the first film.
- Aziz Naser as Pappu
- R.K. as Mama
- Farah Khan as Reshma, Munna's girlfriend
- Gullu Dada and Hussain Bakhali as the duo Sajid-Wajid
- Raghu Karumanchi as Ramesh

== Production ==
Dheer Charan Srivatsav and Mast Ali did not star in the film since they had parted ways.

== Soundtrack ==
Music by Rajesh SS.

- "Zaati Thikana Chahiye (Title Song)" - Hussain Raza
- "You Are My Dulhaniyan" - Hussain Raza
- "Mama Ki Party" - Hussain Raza
- "Telangana" - Bhargavi Pillai
- "Dum Ki Biryani" - Hussain Raza, Neha Uma

== Release ==
Suhas Yellapantula of The Times of India gave the film a rating of three out of five stars and opined that "Hyderabad Nawabs 2 doesn't always live up to its billing as a laugh riot but does have moments that shine and make you laugh out loud whenever you think of them". The film received positive-word-of-mouth upon release despite facing stiff competition from other Telugu films such as iSmart Shankar.
