= Hyderabadi Urdu =

Variety of Urdu

- حیدرآبادی اردو
- Native to: Telangana, Marathwada region of Maharashtra and Kalyana-Karnataka region of Karnataka
- Region: Deccan
- Ethnicity: Deccanis (Hyderabadi Muslims)
- Language family: Indo-European: Indo-Iranian; Indo-Aryan; Central Zone; Western Hindi; Hindustani; Urdu; Deccani Urdu; Hyderabadi Urdu
- Writing system: Perso-Arabic (Urdu alphabet)

Language codes
- ISO 639-3: –
- Glottolog: dakh1244
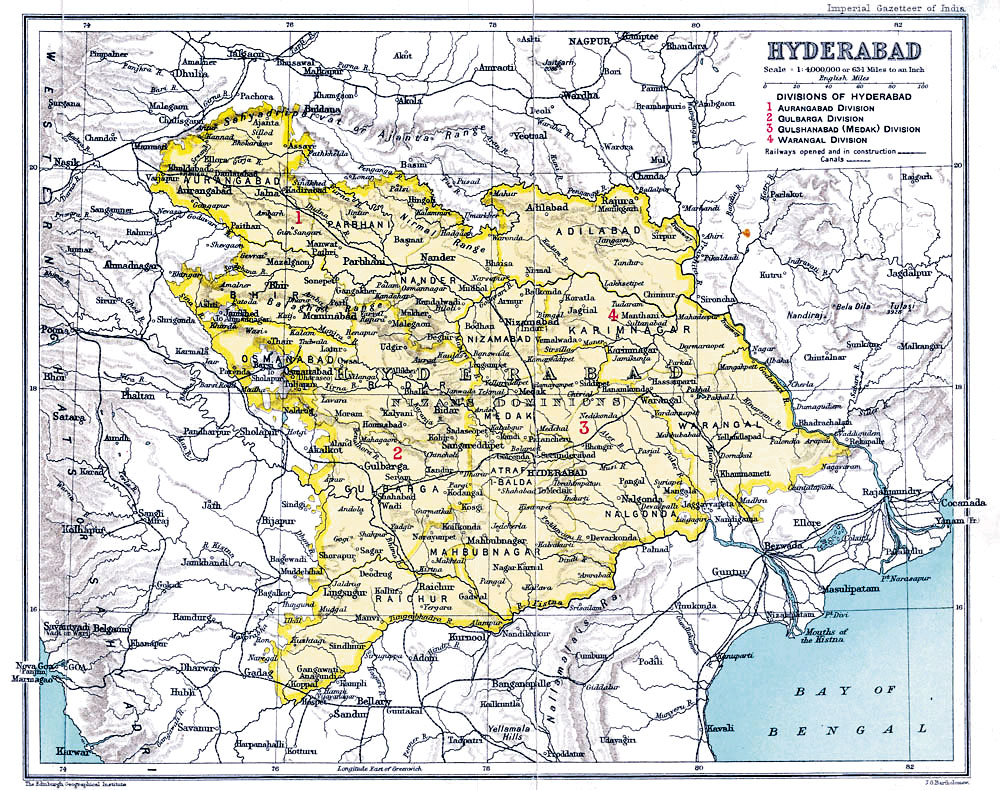

Hyderabadi Urdu (Urdu: حیدرآبادی اردو) is a variety of Dakhini Urdu, spoken in areas of the former Hyderabad State, corresponding to the Indian state of Telangana, the Marathwada region of Maharashtra and the Kalyana-Karnataka region of Karnataka.

It is natively spoken by the Hyderabadi Muslims and their diaspora. It contains loan words from Indian languages like Marathi, Telugu, Kannada and foreign languages like Arabic, Turkic and Persian. Hyderabadi is considered to be a northern variety of Dakhini.

== Distinctive features ==
Hyderabadi is mutually intelligible with most Hindi/Urdu speakers but has distinctive features from interaction with local Indian Languages such as Marathi, Telugu, and Kannada.

=== Phonology ===
The letter ق (qāf) is pronounced as an unvoiced velar fricative /x/ with the same pronunciation as خ (khe) whereas in Standard Hindustani dialects the ق is pronounced as a velar plosive /k/ with the same pronunciation as ک (kāf), or in more educated settings as /q/. For example, the word 'qabar' (grave) is pronounced almost identical as 'khabar' (news).

=== Lexical features ===
Distinct vocabulary unique to Hyderabadis:

- Āra'en آرئیں - (is) coming; "Ā rahe hain" "آرہے ہیں" in standard Urdu
- Čindiyān kardiya چِندیاں کر دیا - Nailed it
- Čupke to bī / čupkaič چُپکے تو بی / چُپکَیچ - No reason
- Hona ہونا - to want, instead of "čāhna" چاہنا in Orthodox Urdu (instead of "mujhē woh čāhi'ē" "مجھے وہ چاہیے" in Orthodox Urdu, Hyderabadi Urdu would use "mērēku woh hona." "میرے کو وہ ہونا")
- Hao ہَؤ - for yes, instead of "Hān" "ہاں".
- Hallu ہلُّو - Slow
- Haula ہَولا - foolish, crazy person
- Hota ki nai ki ہوتا کی نئیں کی - May or may not happen
- Jāndo جاندو - let it go
- Jāra'un جارؤں - I am leaving
- Jāra'en جارئیں - (is) going; جارہے ہیں "jā rahe hain" in standard Urdu
- Kačča(i) (ی)کچا- wet; in standard Urdu, wet would be گیلا "gīla". کچا "kacha" in standard Urdu means "raw".
- Kaīkū کئيکو - why; کیوں "kyūn" or کس لئے "kis li'ē" in standard Urdu.
- Kaīkū ki کئيکو کی - wonder why, who knows why
- Katey کَتے - it is often used when a person mentions something told by someone else. It could be translated as "it seems". Usage: "Kal unay bahar jaara katey" means "It seems he is going outside tomorrow".
- Kxayāli pulāo خیالی پُلاؤ - Wishful thinking
- Kunjī کنجی - keys; in standard Urdu, keys would be chābī چابی.
- Kya toh bī hora کیا تو بی ہو را - what the hell is happening
- Lāiṭ liyo لائٹ لِیو - take it easy
- Mērēku میرے کو - my, instead of "mujhe" مجھے or "mujhko" مجھکو in standard Urdu
- Miyān میاں - fellow (i.e. "Chalo miyan "چلو میاں" means "Let's go, man.")
- Nakko نکو - an alternate (and informal) negative, generally indicating "no", "no thanks" or "don't". It can be (and is often) used in place of نہیں "nahīn", نہ "nā" and مت "mat" (from traditional Urdu) are used where نکو "nakko" is inappropriate for the context or in polite situations.
- Parsūn پرسُوں - literally it means the day before yesterday or the day after tomorrow, but it is widely used for any time in the recent past.
- Phugat پُھگٹ - for free, without cost; یہ کھانا پُھگٹ ہے۔ ("this food is free")
- Poṭṭī پوٹی - derogatory term for girl
- Poṭṭā پوٹا - derogatory term for boy
- Paintābē پَینتابے - socks; in standard Urdu it would be مَوزے "mauzē".
- Tumārē ku تمارے کو - you, instead of tumhen تمہیں or tumko تمکو in standard Urdu
- Tērē ku تیرے کو (informal slang) - you, instead of tujhe or tujhko in standard Urdu
- Uney اُنے - he/she, instead of woh in standard Urdu.
- Zyāda nakko kar زیادہ نکو کر - don't act over smart
- The word اِچ "ič" is often added after a noun or verb to express the confidence of the action. In standard Urdu, ہی "hī" would be used. For example: "Biryāni'ič lāraun mēn" "بریانی اِچ لا رَؤں میں". In standard Urdu this would be "Biryāni hī lā rahā hūn main" "بریانی ہی لا رہا ہوں میں".
- The Urdu word ہے "hai" (be) is often dropped. For example, Urdu "Mujhē mālūm hai" "مجھے معلوم ہے" (I know it) would be "Mērē ku mālum" "میرے کو معلُم".
- Aisich اَیسِچ - No reason/without any reason (casually) as in "ایسچ کرا" "I did it without any reason"
- Huššār حُشّار- Awake, usually used when asking someone if they are awake, in the way "Huššār Hai kyā" "حُشّار ہے کیا؟" meaning "Are you Awake?". It can also mean " intelligent ", replacing the standard "Hošiyār" ہوشیار. This may also be pronounced as "Uššār" اُشّار depending on the part of the city.

== Peculiar features ==
The suffix "ān" is often used to mark plurality. The letter 'n' is an almost silent nasal stop. For example, Log لوگ (people) would become Logān لوگاں, Bāt بات (talk) would become Bātān باتاں, Ādmi آدمی (men) pronounced as Admi ادمی would become Admiyān ادمیاں, etc. in the Hyderabadi dialect.

While talking, many long a's (as in "father") are pronounced "uh" as in "hut." For example, instead of "ādmi" آدمی (man) or "rāsta" راستہ (path) in Orthodox Urdu, Hyderabadi would use "admi" ادمی and "rasta" رستہ. Similarly "bhūl" بھول (to forget), "ṭūṭ" ٹوٹ (to break) and "čūṛi'ān" چوڑیاں (bangles) is "bhul" بُھل, "ṭuṭ" ٹُٹ and "čuṛiyān" چُڑیاں in Hyderabadi.

== Popularity and usage ==
In the early sixties, film star Mehmood popularised another dialect in Indian films, Dakhni slang, which originates from former Mysore State.

A very famous Guinness record holder drama /stage comedy written in Dakhani is Adrak Ke Punjey. Many Urdu poets also write in the Hyderabadi dialect of Dakhani, including Pagal Adilabadi, Khamakha Hyderabadi and Nukko Hyderabadi (of Chicago, Illinois).

Hyderabadi gained sudden prominence and recognition in 2006 after the success of the comedy film The Angrez that adopted the dialect. The film's success sparked several other Hyderabadi dialect films including: Kal Ka Nawaab, Hyderabad Nawaabs, Aadab Hyderabad, Gullu Dada, Gullu Dada Returns, Berozgaar, Hungama In Dubai, Daawat-e-Ishq.

== See also ==
- Deccani language
- Dakhini
- Pagal Adilabadi - Famous Hyderabadi Urdu poet
- List of Urdu-language poets
- Deccani film industry and List of Hyderabadi-language films
- Sushmita Sen - Miss Universe 1994, Biwi No. 1, Sirf Tum, Hindustan Ki Kasam, Aaghaaz, Tumko Na Bhool Payenge, Filhaal, Vaastu Shastra, Main Hoon Na, Maine Pyaar Kyun Kiya?, Main Aisa Hi Hoon and Chingaari famed Bollywood actress was born in Hyderabad
- Dia Mirza - Miss Asia Pacific International 2000, Rehnaa Hai Terre Dil Mein, Tumko Na Bhool Payenge, Dum, Tehzeeb, Kyun! Ho Gaya Na..., Tumsa Nahin Dekha: A Love Story, Blackmail and Koi Mere Dil Mein Hai famed Bollywood actress is originally from Hyderabad
- Aditi Rao Hydari - Member of Tyabji-Hydari family, trained Bharatnatyam dancer; Delhi-6, Yeh Saali Zindagi, LPNY, Murder 3, Boss, Bhoomi, Padmaavat and Heeramandi famed Bollywood actress is also originally from Hyderabad
- Vijay Varma - Pink, Mirzapur, Gully Boy and Lust Stories 2 famed Bollywood actor was also born in Hyderabad
