= Harikatha (TV series) =

Indian television series

- Release poster
- Genre: Crime; Thriller
- Written by: Suresh Jai
- Directed by: Maggi
- Starring: Rajendra Prasad; Sriram; Divi Vadthya; Arjun Ambati; Suman Jha
- Music by: Suresh Bobbili
- Country of origin: India
- Original language: Telugu
- No. of seasons: 1
- No. of episodes: 6

Production
- Executive producer: Sasikiran Narayana
- Producers: T. G. Vishwa Prasad; Vivek Kuchibotla
- Cinematography: Vijay Ulaganath
- Editor: Junaid Siddiqui
- Running time: 30 minutes
- Production company: People Media Factory

Original release
- Network: Disney+ Hotstar
- Release: 13 December 2024

Harikatha is an Indian Telugu-language crime thriller television series directed by Maggi and written by Suresh Jai. Produced by People Media Factory it stars Rajendra Prasad, Sriram, Divi Vadthya, Arjun Ambati and Suman Jha in important roles.

It was released on 13 December 2024 on Disney+ Hotstar.

== Cast ==
- Rajendra Prasad as Rangachari
- Sriram as Virat, an ex Sub-Inspector
- Divi Vadthya as Chamanthi
- Pujita Ponnada as Lisa, a journalist
- Shriya Kontham as Dr.Vaidehi, Rangachari's grand daughter.
- Teja Kakumanu as Kesava, the main antagonist
- Arjun Ambati as SI Bharath, Virat's best friend
- Suman Jha as Hari
- MS Vikram Savyasachi as Marthanda
- Mounika Reddy as Anjali, Virat's wife (cameo appearance)
- Ruchira Saadineni as Swathi, Bharath's fiance
- Usha Shree as Eeramma
- Surabhi Vasudev Rao
- Jai Chandra
- Nukaraju
- Gagan Vihari
- Preeti Nigam

== Episodes ==
No.	Title	Directed by	Written by	Original release date
1	"Beginning of the End"	Maggi	Suresh Jai	13 December 2024
2	"Unsleeping Forest"	Maggi	Suresh Jai	13 December 2024
3	"Vamana's Third Step"	Maggi	Suresh Jai	13 December 2024
4	"Dark Hours"	Maggi	Suresh Jai	13 December 2024
5	"Aham Bramhasmi"	Maggi	Suresh Jai	13 December 2024
6	"Kalki"	Maggi	Suresh Jai	13 December 2024

== Reception ==
Avad Mohammad of OTTPlay gave a rating of 2 out of 5 and stated that "Harikatha is a half-baked thriller that is rushed, lacks engaging thrills, and suffers from poor characterization. Only Rajendra Prasad’s performance stands out in this series, which has a predictable premise and little to offer in terms of novelty". 123Telugu also had a similar opinion saying "Harikatha is a routine and average revenge drama. The core theme of God himself being linked to the killings is interesting, and the suspense elements evoke curiosity to an extent. However, the revenge plot feels quite mundane". Eenadu also gave a mixed review appreciating the pre-climax scenes and the performance of Rajendra Prasad.

== See also ==
- List of Disney+ Hotstar original programming
