= Pagal Adilabadi =

Indian poet

Ahmed Shareef
- Born: 19 May 1941; Nizamabad, Andhra Pradesh (now in Telangana), India
- Died: c.2007 (aged 65–66)
- Occupation: Poet
- Writing career
- Pen name: Pagal Adilabadi
- Subjects: Humour, Love

Ahmed Shareef (Urdu: احمد شريف), (19 May 1941 – c.2007), popularly known as Pagal Adilabadi (Urdu: احمد شريف پاگل عادل آبادى), was an Urdu poet from Adilabad, India. He wrote mazahiya shayari or humorous poetry in his native dialect of Hyderabadi Urdu. His pen name, "Pagal", means "crazy" in Urdu.

== Early life ==
Pagal Adilabadi was born 19 May 1941 in Nizamabad district. He was a teacher in a government school in Adilabad, hence the name.

== Career ==
Pagal Adilabadi wrote humorous poems, shayari in Urdu.

The book Khusur Phusr collects his life work. In the initial stage of his life he never published his works. He was busy working as a teacher, but after retiring from his job, he started writing the books.

Ahmed Sherif died at the age of 66 while working on his book Bagare Baingan.

== Bibliography ==
- Khusur Phusr - Goonj publications (Nizamabad).
