= Prachi Thaker =

Indian actress

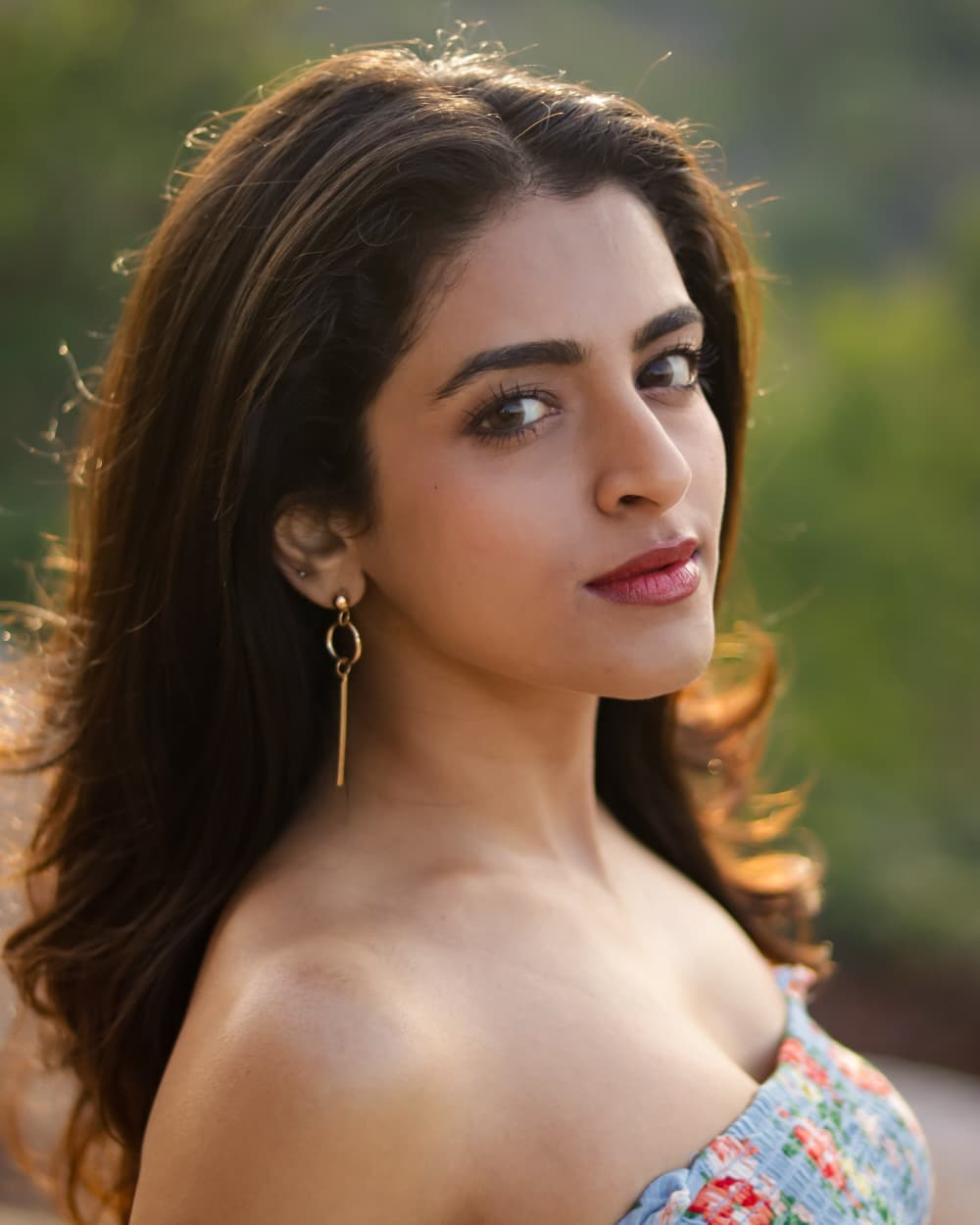
- Born: Ahmedabad
- Education: NIFT, Hyderabad
- Occupation: Actress
- Years active: 2014–present

Prachi Thaker is an Indian actress who primarily works in Telugu and Gujarati cinema.

== Early life and education ==
Prachi Thaker was born in Ahmedabad, Gujarat. She studied at the National Institute of Fashion Technology, Hyderabad. During her student years, she participated in beauty and fashion competitions, including Miss University Gujarat and Miss Spectrum NIFT Hyderabad.

== Filmography ==
=== Film ===
Year	Title	Role	Language	Notes	Ref
2015	Pataas	Kavya	Telugu		
2022	Raado	Shaily	Gujarati		
2022	Virgin story	Ruchi	Telugu		
2023	Love you too	Sushma	Telugu		
2023	Rajugari Kodipulao	Candy	Telugu		
2023	Perfume	Leela	Telugu		
2024	Ajay Gadu	Roopa	Telugu		
2026	Kaano	Krishna	Gujarati		
2026	Maaran	Urmi	Gujarati		

=== Web series ===
Year	Title	Role	Language	Platform	Ref
2020	Vitamin she	Vaidhehi	Telugu	Amazon Prime Video	
2023	Taari Maari Mulakatho	Janvi	Gujarati	Shemaroo Me	

=== Short films ===
Year	Title	Role	Language	Notes	Ref
2014	Silent Melody	Swetha	Telugu	Directed by Prashanth Varma	

== Awards ==
Year	Film	Award	Category	Result	Ref
2015	Pataas	IIFA Utsavam - 2015	Performance in a Supporting Role – Female	Nominated	
