= Adnan Sajid Khan =

Indian comedian and actor

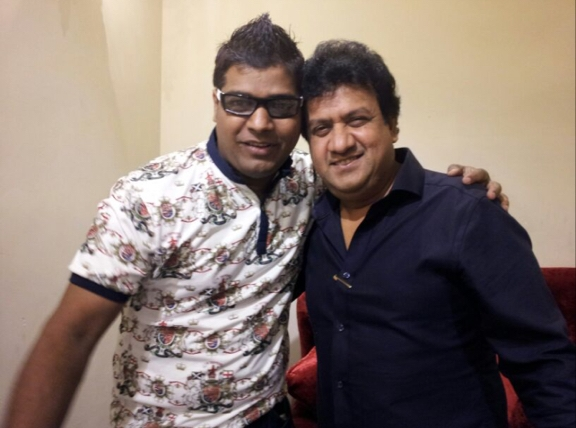
- Adnan Khan (right)
- Born: 20 July 1965 (age 61); Hyderabad, Andhra Pradesh (now in Telangana), India
- Occupations: Actor; comedian; singer; producer; dialogue writer; Screenplay Writer
- Years active: 2007–present

Adnan Sajid Khan, is an Indian comedian and actor, popularly known by his stage names Gullu Dada and Gullu Bhai.

== Career ==
He initially started as a stage singer in the 1990s, and became an actor in 2007. He is one of the most popular faces in the Deccani film industry.

He got his first break as an actor in the RK Mama production FM Fun Aur Masti in which he played the role of a local don, Gullu Dada. He eventually got fame through the role. He is most notable for the Bollywood movie Saajan Chale Sasural 2, directed by N.N Siddiqui.

He has been a part of more than 20 movies in the Hyderabadi language, with most of them completing 50 days in theatres in the Nizam circuit.

He is known for his catchphrase "Aaainn!"

== Restaurant ==
In 2019, Gullu Dada opened a biryani restaurant. It serves many varieties, most notably zafrani (saffron) biryani.

The franchise has since expanded to four branches:

- Masabtank, opposite MS College
- Attapur, at Pillar No. 121
- Shaikhpet, beside D-Mart Aaaien
- Abids, beside State Bank of India

== Filmography ==
Year	Title	Role(s)	Notes
2007	FM Fun Aur Masti	Gullu Dada	
2010	Gullu Dada Returns	Gullu Dada	
2011	Zabardast	Tillu Terror	
2011	Thriller	Rambo	
2011	Sab Ki Bolti Band	Baba	
2011	Ja Bhai Ja		
2011	Family Pack	Sultan / Akbar	Dual role
2011	Take Away		
2012	Gullu Dada 3	Gullu Dada	
2013	Gullu Dada 4	Gullu Dada	
2014	Ek Tha Sardaar	Baba Bhai	
2014	Stepney	Adnan	
2015	Gangs of Hyderabad	Gullu	
2016	Dawat E Shaadi	Gore Bhai	
2016	Dubai Return	Aslam Khan	
2016	Badmash Pottey		
2016	Hero Hyderabadi		
2017	Stepney 2		
2017	Gullu Dada 5	Gullu Dada	
2017	Inspector Gullu	Inspector Gullu	
2018	Colour Photo	Khuddus Tubewala	
2018	Bhoot Bhaijaan	Sameer	
2018	08 November Croadpati	Sikander	
2019	Hyderabad Nawabs 2	Sajid	
2019	Maa Ka Laadla	Ali Bhai	
2021	Bolo Hau	Khursheed	
