= Ruthuragalu =

Telugu television series (1997–2000)

- Genre: Drama
- Story by: Yaddanapudi Sulochana Rani
- Directed by: Manjula Naidu; Sudhakar Pallamala
- Starring: Roopa Devi; Rajeev Kanakala; Sameer; Prabhakar; Preeti Nigam; Vinod Bala; Maharshi Raghava; Raja; Singampalli Sruthi; Dilip Kumar Salvadi
- Theme music composer: Bunty-Ramesh
- Opening theme: "Vasantha Sameeram la" sung by Bunty and Alakananda
- Country of origin: India
- Original language: Telugu
- No. of seasons: 1
- No. of episodes: 582

Production
- Producer: Manjula Naidu
- Production locations: Hyderabad, India
- Running time: 17–20 minutes
- Production company: Sashank Televisions

Original release
- Network: DD Saptagiri
- Release: 1997 – 2000

Ruthuragalu is the first Indian Telugu-language drama television series that aired on DD 8 (now DD Saptagiri) from 1997 to 2000, with a total of 582 episodes. Directed by Manjula Naidu and Sudhakar Pallamala, and produced by Manjula Naidu, the series was based on a story by Yaddanapudi Sulochana Rani. It is regarded as one of the earliest daily soap operas in Telugu television, airing on weekdays at 4:30 PM. A sequel name Ruthugeetham (Ruthuragaalu 2) aired in ETV (Telugu) on weekdays at same time slot from 2017 to 2018 focussing on second generation with a total of 303 episodes.

The series revolves around the interconnected lives of several families, highlighting their relationships, struggles, and moral conflicts. The show received recognition for its narrative and character development and achieved significant viewership during its run. The title song, "Vasantha Sameeram la," gained popularity. It also provided a platform for actors like Rajeev Kanakala, Preeti Nigam, and ETV Prabhakar, who later gained prominence. The show contributed to establishing Manjula Naidu as a leading figure in Telugu television.

== Premise ==
The show portrays the lives of multiple interconnected families, highlighting their relationships, personal challenges, and moral conflicts. It addresses themes such as love, betrayal, and redemption, set within the context of familial and societal tensions. The storyline unfolds through various dramatic developments, focusing on the complexities of human relationships and their resilience in the face of adversity.

== Cast ==
- Roopa Devi as Saradha
- Rajeev Kanakala as Prudhvi
- Sameer as Vamsi Krishna (episodes 341-582)
- Prabhakar as Kamalakar
- Vinod Bala
- Maharshi Raghava as Srinivas
- Raja
- Singampalli Sruthi as Swapna
- Ayesha Jaleel
- Preeti Nigam as Haritha
- Harishchandra Rayala
- Meka Ramakrishna as Sridhar
- Manchala Suryanarayana
- Harsha Vardhan as Harish
- Hema
- Vallabhaneni Janardhan
- Nagesh Karra as Harish
- Madhusudhan Rao
- Sri Divya (child actress)
- Dilip Kumar Salvadi (child actor) as Vardhan
- Sri Ramya (child actress)
- Ravi Teja in a guest appearance

== Production ==
The series was directed by Manjula Naidu and Sudhakar Pallamala, with Sashank Televisions serving as the production house. Roopa Devi, known for her roles in acclaimed art films like Daasi (1988), played a lead character in the serial.

Ravi Teja, who later rose to prominence as a major film star, reportedly appeared in the series during the early stages of his career in an episodic role.

Sri Divya made her first appearance on camera at the age of three in Ruthuragalu. She was discovered by director Manjula Naidu at a dance performance by her elder sister. Initially, Sri Divya was set to appear in only a few episodes, but her role was extended due to the positive audience response.

== Music ==
The opening theme song, "Vasantha Sameeram la", was composed by Bunty-Ramesh, with vocals by Bunty and Sunitha. The lyrics were written by Balabhadrapatruni Madhu. The serial is noted for its title song, which was frequently heard during its evening telecasts.

== Release ==
Ruthuragalu premiered on 15 December 1997, airing Monday to Friday at 4:30 PM. The series ran until September 2000, completing a total of 582 episodes. Initially, it was re-telecast at 8:30 PM on the same day, although this re-broadcast was discontinued after some time.

== Reception ==
Ruthuragalu received audience and critical acclaim for its narrative and well-defined characters. The show attracted a significant audience during its run.

== Awards ==
Year	Name of Organization
2001	Millennium Awards
2000	Osmania University Cultural Association
2000	Vasavi Vartha
2000	Kalanilayam
2000	Supraja Kala Bharati
2000	Tirupathi Chamber Award
2000	AP Film Cine Circle Amarajeevita Award
1999	Akasavani TV awards
1999	Vartha - Vasavi TV Award

== Legacy ==
Ruthuragalu is regarded as a notable show in Telugu television history, being one of the first daily soap operas in the language and introducing a new format of storytelling. The show's narrative and characters were well-received and contributed to the evolution of daily serials in Telugu television, showcasing the potential of regional television as a medium for storytelling.

The serial also served as a career breakthrough for several actors, including Rajeev Kanakala, Roopa Devi, Preeti Nigam, Prabhakar, and Singampalli Sruthi. Preeti Nigam, who portrayed Haritha, later married her co-star Nagesh Karra, who played Harish in the series. Similarly, Singampalli Sruthi married her co-star Madhusudhan, who also appeared in the show. Both Nigam and Prabhakar acknowledged the serial's role in shaping their professional journeys.
