= Dheer Charan Srivastav =

Indian actor

- Born: 9 August 1967 (age 59); Hyderabad, Andhra Pradesh (now in Telangana), India
- Education: Osmania University
- Occupation: Actor
- Years active: 2005 – present
- Relatives: Tanmaye Shrivastav (Daughter)

Dheer Charan Srivastav also known as D. C. Srivastav (born 9 August 1967), is an Indian character actor, comedian and dialogue writer from Hyderabad, Telangana, who mostly appears in Hyderabad Deccani Urdu, Telugu and Hindi Films. He is most notable for his role as Ismail Bhai in comedy films, The Angrez (2006), Hyderabad Nawabs (2006) and Hungama in Dubai (2007). He is also known for his Hyderabadi dialect humor.

== Early life and education ==
Srivastav was born and brought up in Hyderabad. He grew up at Himaytnagar locality, and studied at Daffodils School, where his mother Pushpa Srivastav taught Hindi. He completed his intermediate from St. Anthony's High School, Hyderabad in 1985. Later he graduated from Osmania University in 1995.

== Career ==
Prior to films, he was a Network Techno Marketing Manager in Hyderabad. He is quite adept in comedy and character roles. He holds the Best Hyderabadi Deccani Urdu Comedian Award for acting in The Angrez. He acted in Bollywood movie with the Indian Film Director Ram Gopal Varma's (RGV) Department.

== Filmography ==
=== As actor ===
- Note that Hindi may refer to the Deccani film industry.

Year	Film	Role	Language
2005	The Angrez	Ismail Bhai	Hindi
2006	Hyderabad Nawaabs	Hanif Bhai	Hindi
2007	Stalemate..Its your name	Father	Hindi
2007	Hungama in Dubai	Nawaab Saab	Hindi
2009	Manorama	Anna	Telugu
2009	Sontha Ooru	Mechanic	Telugu
2010	Golimaar	Pimp	Telugu
2011	Ayyappa Sakshi	Village man	Telugu
2011	Inki toh Aisi Ki Tasi	Sheik Chilli	Hindi
2012	Department	Shukla	Hindi
2012	Login	Medical Shop Owner	Hindi
2013	Himmatwala	Village Man	Hindi
2013	Paisa Potti Problem	Chunnu Bhai	Hindi
2013	Do Nawab Hyderabad ke	Pasha Bhai	Hindi
2014	Anaamika	Hotel Manager	Telugu/Tamil
2014	Paisa	Prakash's friend	Telugu
2015	The Angrez 2	Ismail Bhai	Hindi
2015	Gangs Of Hyderabad	Ismail Bhai	Hindi
2016	Sardaar Gabbar Singh	Hakeem	Telugu
2016	Tiger Sultan	Faizal	Hindi
2017	127B	Chand Miyan Ittarwala	Hindi
2019	Mallesham	Abdul	Telugu
2024	Zebra		Telugu
2025	Mithra Mandali	cameo role	Telugu
