= ETV Prabhakar =

Indian actor, producer, and director

- Born: Prabhakar Podakandla
- Occupations: Actor; producer; director
- Years active: 1990s–present
- Known for: Ruthuragalu; Muddu Bidda
- Spouse: Malayaja
- Children: 2

ETV Prabhakar is an Indian actor, producer, and director who works in Telugu television and films.

== Early life and career ==
Originally from Khammam, Prabhakar became a home guard for the police department after finishing his tenth standard. He then graduated in theatre at Nizam College, where he was awarded a gold medal by C Rangarajan, the governor at the time. He made his debut with the Doordarshan serial Chanakya after a chance meeting with his friend turned into an accidental debut. His turning point in his career came with the serial Ruthuragalu. Afterwards, he worked as a dubbing artist for actors like Uday Kiran, Prabhu Deva, Aryan Rajesh, Abbas, apart from sixty newcomers.

He later became the creative manager of ETV and produced shows like Yahoo, Star War, and Smile Raja Smile. He later left ETV and acted in Muddu Bidda, which gained him recognition. He later produced Anna Chellelu and Moodu Mulla Bandham.

In 2017, he made his directorial debut through Next Nuvve before directing Brand Babu the following year. He made his lead film debut through Rajugari Kodipulao (2023).

== Personal life ==
He is married to Malayaja and has a son and a daughter. His daughter acted in Anna Chellelu and won a Nandi Award.

== Filmography ==
=== Films ===
As director

Year	Film	Ref.
2017	Next Nuvve	
2018	Brand Babu	

As actor

Year	Film	Role	Ref.
2007	Maisamma IPS		
2008	Hare Ram	Rajeev	
2008	Homam	Potti Sathi	
2023	Rajugari Kodipulao		
2024	Music Shop Murthy		
2024	Ramnagar Bunny		Also producer
2025	Brahma Anandam	Brahma’s uncle	
2025	Ghatikachalam	Parashuram	
2026	Hyy Chikitha		

=== Television ===
Year	Title	Role	Network	Notes	Ref.
1990s	Chanakya		DD Saptagiri		
1990s	Ruthuragalu		DD Saptagiri		
2009–2025	Muddu Bidda		Zee Telugu	Also director and producer	
2018	Ganga Manga	—N/a	Zee Telugu	As director	
2021	Vadinamma		Star Maa	Also producer	
2024	Love Sex & Death		YouTube	Web series released on Shiva Kona's channel	
2026	Illu Illalu Pillalu		Star Maa		
