= Preeti Nigam =

Indian actress

- Occupation: Actress
- Years active: 1996-present

Preeti Nigam is an Indian television actress, known for her performances in Telugu-language serials. She has had a career spanning over two decades, with notable roles in both positive and negative characters. Her acting career began in the 1990s, and she is recognized for her roles in several successful serials such as Ruthuragalu, Kasturi, and Chandramukhi.

== Early life and background ==
Preeti Nigam was born and raised in Hyderabad in a Kayastha family with roots in Uttar Pradesh. Her ancestors migrated from Uttar Pradesh to the Nizam's dominions and settled in Hyderabad several years ago. She spent her early years in the Sultan Bazar area and initially did not know Telugu. Coming from a family with a strong background in the arts, Preeti received training in classical dance forms such as Kathak and Kuchipudi. During her school years, she gave her first stage performance at the Birla Mandir.

== Career ==
Despite her interest in acting, Preeti's entry into the industry was met with resistance from her father, who questioned the necessity of acting for girls. However, her mother encouraged her passion. Preeti initially faced challenges due to her lack of proficiency in Telugu. Her acting debut came in 1989 in a dance-based documentary film, where she delivered a small dialogue. Her first notable role was in the Doordarshan serial Aaradhana, where she was initially hired as a choreographer but was later asked to act. Unable to speak Telugu at the time, she played a mute character, relying solely on her expressive eyes.

Preeti initially struggled with Telugu but learned the language to advance her career. She gained recognition for her performance in Ruthuragalu (1996–1999), a popular serial where she portrayed the character of Haritha. The serial’s title song became immensely popular, and Preeti's portrayal earned her widespread acclaim. She continued to rise to fame with other notable roles in serials like Kasturi, Adadhi, Endamavulu, Kavyanjali, and Santhi Nivasam. Her career further soared when she portrayed negative roles, particularly in Chandramukhi. She has also appeared in serials like Swati Chinukulu, America Ammayi, and Sravana Sameeralu, balancing both positive and negative shades of characters.

In addition to her extensive television career, Preeti has acted in several Telugu and Hindi films. She featured in films such as Student No: 1, Sai, Chakali Ailamma, Jai Telangana, and Tripura. She played supporting roles in several films including the Hindi films Welcome to Sajjanpur (2008) and Well Done Abba (2009) before portraying the lead role of the revolutionary Chakali Ilamma in the film of the same name in 2013.

== Personal life ==
Preeti is married to Nagesh Karra, whom she met during the shooting of Ruthuragalu. They have two children, Adithi Sri and Aryan. Their son Aryan was selected to represent India in the World Roller Games in Barcelona (Spain) in 2019.

== Filmography ==
=== Films ===
Year	Film	Role	Language	Notes
2001	Student No: 1		Telugu	
2002	Santosham	Rani	Telugu	
2002	Avunu Valliddaru Ista Paddaru!	Nookaraju's wife	Telugu	
2003	Ee Abbai Chala Manchodu	Vivekananda's step-mother	Telugu	
2003	Kabaddi Kabaddi	Nagendra's wife	Telugu	
2003	Back Pocket		Telugu	
2004	Sye	Prudhvi's mother	Telugu	
2004	Kaani	Lakshmini	Telugu	
2005	Meenakshi		Telugu	
2006	Asadhyudu	Ram's wife	Telugu	
2008	Welcome to Sajjanpur	Jamuna Bai	Hindi	
2008	Ready	Pooja's mother	Telugu	
2009	Well Done Abba	Sakina's mother	Hindi	
2010	Shoebite		Hindi	Unreleased
2013	Chakali Ailamma	Chakali Ailamma	Telugu	
2015	Tripura	Tripura's servant	Telugu	
2014	Stepney	Sameena	Deccani	
2016	Best of Luck		Deccani	
2019	Hulchul	Rudra's mother	Telugu	
2021	Bolo Hau	Rukhsar's mother	Deccani	

=== Television ===
- All television shows are in Telugu, unless otherwise noted.

Year	Title	Role	Channel	Notes
1996 -1999	Ruthuragalu	Haritha	DD-8	
	Kasturi	Sunila		
	Anubhandhalu			
	Devadasu			
2003 - 2008	Chakravakam		Gemini TV	
2007 - 2013	Chandramukhi	Yashodhara	ETV Telugu	
2011	Sundarakanda	Bhanumathi Devi	Gemini TV	
2012 - 2014	Kanchana Ganga		Star Maa	
2013 - 2016	Sravana Sameeralu		Gemini TV	
2013 - 2020	Swathi Chinukulu	Sunanda	ETV Telugu	
2015 - 2018	America Ammayi	Jayanthi Vajrapati	Zee Telugu	
2017 - 2018	Ruthu Geetham		ETV Telugu	
2017 - 2018	Uyyala Jampala	Neeraja	Star Maa	
2018 - 2019	Kante Kurtune Kanali	Bhramarambika Devi	Star Maa	
2020 - 2021	Deeparadhana	Muneeswari	Gemini TV	
2020-2021	Intinti Gruhalakshmi	Anjali	Star Maa	Extended Cameo
2021-present	Paape Maa Jeevanajyothi	Hymavathi	Star Maa	
2021	Swarna Palace	Rangamma	Zee Telugu	
2021	Ishmart Jodi 2	Contestant	Star Maa	Participated with her husband Nagesh
2023-present	Kalisundam Raa	Shakti	ETV Telugu	
2024	Harikatha		Disney+ Hotstar	
