= PhulBan =

PhulBan پھول بن
- Author: Muhammad Mazharuddin Ibn Nashati
- Language: Deccani language (Urdu)
- Subject: Romance and adventures
- Genre: Romance and adventures
- Publication date: 1656
- Publication place: India

Muhammad Mazharuddin Ibn Nashati also known as "Ibn Nashati" was a 17th century Deccani language court poet of Golconda Sultan Abdullah Qutb Shah. His Masnavi PhulBan-"Flower garden" composed in 1656 into Dakhini Urdu from Persian masnavi Basatin of 14th Century.

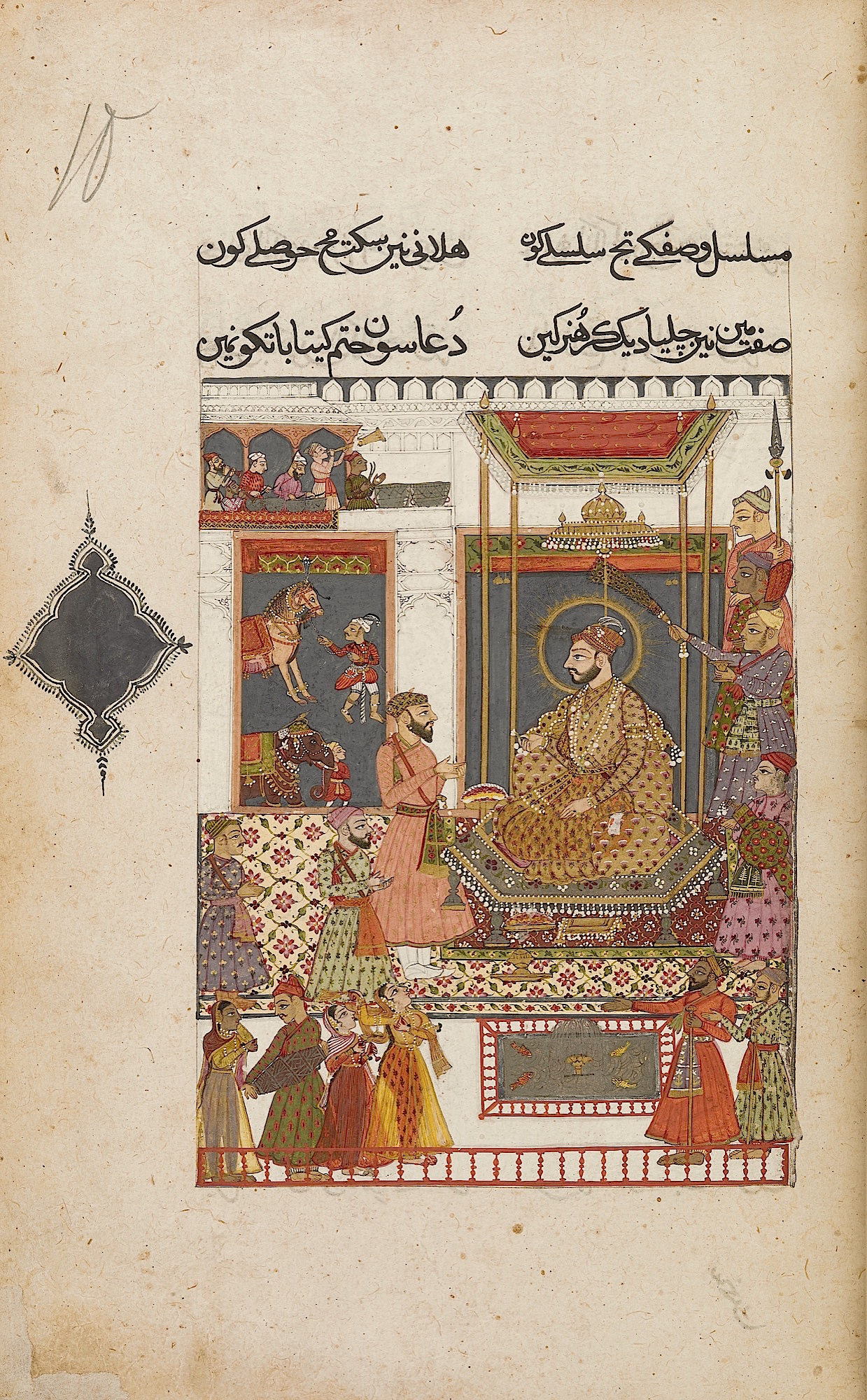
Illustrated page from ibn-e-Nishati's "Phulban" (Flower Garden), a Deccani Urdu rendition of a Persian work, Basatin. Written by "Ibn Nishati" under the patronage of Abdullah Qutb Shah, depicted here seated on a throne.

== PhulBan ==
The composition genre of PhulBan is a blend of romance and adventures, with 3500 lines and 2000 couplets it is a collection of anecdote leading to each other, the opening element of the book is a tale narrated by a Dervish to the king of the mythical city of gold. Further stories consist of fabled Chinese merchants, illustrious kings, fictitious princes and princesses, fairy-tales, mythical birds and mendicant Dervish's and Yogis.

As claimed by the author Ibn Nishati, the composition is a Dakhini Urdu translation of Persian language work Basatin-(Gardens) by Ahmad Zubairi written in the reign of the 14th century Delhi sultan Muhammad bin Tughluq.

According to Sunil Sharma-(Professor of Persian and Comparative Literature at Boston University)-an article published by British Library on 22 December 2017; "This Persian Basatin has generally been considered as a reference to a lost work, but it is most likely the 15th-century Indo-Persian prose romance, Basatin al-uns (Garden of companionship) written by Muhammad ibn Sadr Taj ‘Abdusi Akhsitan Dihlavi, a work that had a moderate degree of readership in the early modern period."
