= Rajugari Kodipulao =

- Directed by: Shiva Kona
- Written by: Shiva Kona
- Produced by: Anil Moduga; Shiva Kona
- Starring: Shiva Kona; Prabhakar Podakandla; Neha Deshpande; Prachi Thaker; Abhilash Bhandari; Jabardast Naveen; Kunal Kaushik; Ramya Dinesh; Sri Sudha Bhimireddy
- Cinematography: Pavan Guntuku
- Edited by: Basava; Shiva Kona
- Music by: Pravin Mani
- Release date: 4 August 2023
- Running time: 140 minutes
- Country: India
- Language: Telugu

Rajugari Kodipulao is a 2023 Indian Telugu forest adventure film directed by Shiva Kona. The movie stars Shiva Kona and Prabhakar Podakandla along with Prachi Thaker, and Neha Deshpande. The supporting cast includes Jabardast Naveen, Abhilash Bhandari, Sri Sudha Bhimireddy, Kunal Kaushik, and Ramya Dinesh. The movie was released theatrically on 4 August 2023, to positive reviews from critics.

== Plot ==
Three couples—Farooq and Esha, Chaitanya (nicknamed Candy) and Danny, and Badri and Akansha—go on a road trip. Farooq, Candy, Badri, and Akansha were classmates in college and have remained close friends. Esha is a workaholic who spends little time with her family. Badri and Akansha have a troubled marriage, while Akansha and Farooq are secretly having an affair.

While driving through a remote jungle with no mobile signal, their car breaks down. As their destination, a resort, is only 10 kilometers away and there may be dangerous wild animals in the area, they decide to leave the car behind and walk the rest of the way. During the journey, however, their malfunctioning compass causes them to lose their way in the jungle.

Candy later dies after eating poisonous leaves. After carrying her body for some time and still being unable to find the resort, the group, exhausted, decides to leave her body behind and return with help from the resort staff later. As night falls, they are forced to spend the night in the jungle. The following morning, Esha is missing. The group searches for her but finds only her shoes and bloodstained pieces of clothing, leading them to believe that she has been attacked. Farooq and Danny argue fiercely after Danny suggests abandoning the search and finding the resort first before returning with help.

Suspicion begins to grow within the group, with each member fearing that one of the others may be responsible for their predicament. Farooq privately suspects Danny because of his suspicious behavior. Danny showed little emotion after Candy's apparent death, and despite claiming to be a doctor, he possesses almost no medical knowledge.

The next morning, Danny is missing, while Farooq is found with blood on his hands. Farooq claims that he discovered the blood on the ground and has no idea what happened to Danny. Badri privately tells Akansha that he suspects Farooq, believing that Farooq may be using the situation to eliminate Esha and any witnesses so that he can be with the woman with whom he is having an affair. The accusation terrifies Akansha, as she does not know whether Badri is aware that she is Farooq's lover. Meanwhile, Farooq privately accuses Badri, believing that Badri has discovered the affair and is seeking revenge.

The group later discovers an isolated house in the jungle and takes shelter inside. Soon afterward, they find that the owner has been murdered shortly before their arrival. Panicked, Akansha realizes that someone has deliberately orchestrated the entire situation but cannot determine who is responsible. Meanwhile, Farooq's desperate attempts to find Esha make Akansha jealous, prompting her to reconcile with Badri.

The following morning, Farooq is found dead. Danny and Candy are then revealed to be the killers. They tie up Badri and Akansha and explain their actions:

Candy grew up in a dysfunctional family in which neither of her parents showed her any affection. Her disabled father constantly mistreated both Candy and her mother. Believing that his death would free them, Candy killed him when no one else was at home. Shortly afterward, however, she discovered her mother having an affair with a truck driver, confirming the accusations her father had always made. Candy came to believe that her mother's infidelity was the root cause of her family's suffering and ultimately killed her as well. Since then, Candy has developed a deep hatred of unfaithful people. Over the years, she has murdered several people whom she knew were cheating on their partners, including her own cousin and Akansha's former boyfriend.

After learning about the affair between Akansha and Farooq, and after Badri attempted to flirt with her, Candy and her boyfriend Danny, a gangster, devised a plan to kill all three of them. They sabotaged the car and tampered with the compass to strand the group in the jungle. Candy later faked her own death so that she could secretly carry out the murders without arousing suspicion.

Candy and Danny reveal that they also murdered Esha after she witnessed Farooq's killing. They further reveal that they have already called the police and intend to frame Badri for all of the murders once the authorities arrive.

Candy then prepares to kill Badri and Akansha, but unexpectedly shoots Danny instead, explaining that he knows too much about her past. At that moment, Badri manages to free himself and fights Candy. He seizes her gun and shoots her in the leg, incapacitating her. The police later arrive and arrest Candy.

== Cast ==
- Shiva Kona
- Prabhakar Podakandla
- Neha Deshpande
- Prachi Thaker
- Ramya Dinesh
- Abhilash Bhandari
- Jabardast Naveen
- Kunal Kaushik
- Sri Sudha Bhimireddy

== Soundtrack ==
The lyrical video "Tsunami" featured vocal artists from Canada.

Rajugari Kodipulao

Soundtrack album by Pravin Mani, Sashank Tirupathi
- Released: 2023
- Recorded: 2023
- Genre: Feature film soundtrack
- Language: Telugu
- Label: Aditya Music
- Producer: Pravin Mani

All music is composed by Pravin Mani.

Tracklist
No.	Title	Lyrics	Singer(s)	Length
1.	"Tsunami"	Mallika Vallabha Pitla	NC Karunya, Vaishali Sri Prathap	3:19

== Reception ==
Rajugari Kodipulao received positive reviews from critics.

Deccan Chronicle wrote that it impresses with its skillful direction, captivating visuals, meaningful music, and a significant social message.

The Hans India acclaimed Kona's directorial debut as a masterpiece, commending the blend of suspense, entertainment, narrative, twists, and thrilling sequences.

Sakshi Post found it to be an entertaining thriller and a good watch.
