= Bolo Hau =

- Directed by: Tarun Dhanrajgir
- Written by: Tarun Dhanrajgir
- Screenplay by: Abid Shah
- Produced by: Tarun Dhanrajgir
- Starring: Adnan Sajid Khan; Jahnavi Dhanrajgir
- Release date: 15 January 2021
- Running time: 94 minutes
- Country: India
- Language: Dakhini

Bolo Hau (transl. Say yes) is a 2021 Indian Dakhini-language romantic drama film directed and produced by Tarun Dhanrajgir. The film's main cast is Adnan Sajid Khan and Jahnavi Dhanrajgir.

== Cast ==
- Adnan Sajid Khan as Khursheed
- Jahnavi Dhanrajgir as Rukhsar
- Preeti Nigam as Rukhsar's mother
- Ankit Rathi as Salman
