= Khamakha Hyderabadi =

Urdu language poet from Hyderabad, India

- Born: Ghouse Moiuddin Ahmed; 1929; Hyderabad
- Died: 2017
- Occupation: Urdu poet
- Writing career
- Genres: Ghazal, Nazm
- Subjects: Humour, satire

Khamakha Hyderabadi (1929–2017) His real name was Syed Ghouse Mohiuddin, but he became famous under the pen name “Khamakha Hyderabadi” (which literally means “Without reason, from Hyderabad”). He was an Urdu language poet from Hyderabad in the Indian state of Telangana. He was known for his poems and was a regular at Mazahiya Mushairas. He wrote in his native Dakhni dialect, specializing in humour and satire.

== Bibliography ==
He authored three books:

- Harf-e-Mukarrar (A Story Retold)
- Ba-Fard-e-Muhal
- Kagaz ke Tishey
