= Deccani cinema =

Deccani and Hyderabadi Urdu-language film industry

The Deccani film industry, also known as Dollywood, is the Deccani and Hyderabadi Urdu-language film industry based in Hyderabad, India. The films have gained popularity not only in the Deccan region of India, but as well as other Hindi-Urdu speaking areas of the world. The films are produced in the Deccani language, an Indo-Aryan language spoken in the Deccan region of southern India, and more specifically, in Hyderabadi Urdu, while some films incorporate standard Urdu dialogues as well, especially in its music.

Originally labelled as "Hindi" films by the Central Board of Film Certification, the industry now has its own language tag of Dakhini.

== List of Deccani films ==
| Film | Year |
|---|---|
| The Angrez | 2005 |
| Hyderabad Nawabs | 2006 |
| Hungama in Dubai | 2007 |
| FM Fun Aur Masti | 2007 |
| Stepney | 2014 |
| The Angrez 2 | 2015 |
| Dawat-E-Shaadi | 2016 |
| Dubai Return | 2016 |
| Stepney 2 Returns | 2017 |
| Hyderabad Nawabs 2 | 2019 |
| Bolo Hau | 2021 |

== Films featuring Deccani ==
=== Hindi films ===
- Ankur (1974)
- Nishant (1975)
- Bazaar (1982)
- Nikaah (1982)
- Mandi (1983)
- Hero Hiralal (1988)
- Meenaxi: A Tale of Three Cities (2004)
- Well Done Abba (2010)
- Daawat-e-Ishq (2014)
- Bobby Jasoos (2014)
- Lust Stories 3 (2026)

=== English films ===
- Hyderabad Blues (1998)
- Hyderabad Blues 2 (2004)
- Deccani Souls (2012)
