= Hyderabad Nawabs =

- Directed by: Lakshmikanth Chenna
- Produced by: R.K.
- Starring: Mast Ali; Vandana Gupta; Stuti Misra; Aziz Naser; Dheer Charan Srivastav; Raju Srivastav
- Cinematography: Joshi
- Music by: Vishwa
- Release date: 2006
- Country: India
- Language: Deccani Urdu

Hyderabad Nawabs is a 2006 Indian Hyderabadi-language comedy film. The plot revolves around four groups of people in the city of Hyderabad.

== Plot ==
It all starts out in Old City, Hyderabad. In an alley, Suri, Ajju Tehzab's right-hand man, is selling drugs to a "party", in Mama's territory. One of Mama's men, is eating while taking guard of Mama's territory while Mama is away. He sees Suri and walks over to him. They both start fighting, when Mama enters. Mama starts beating up Suri, and he runs away.

Once back in Mangalat, Suri tells Ajju Tehzab that Mama and his men beat him up, slightly exaggerating to make it seem worse. Ajju Tehzab replies, while playing Carom, that he will take care of Mama.

Hanif Bhai is introduced in the movie. Rumors say that before he was a store owner, he used to be a chicken thief. While cutting chicken, his friend, Sajid Bhai comes along. While talking with Sajid Bhai, Hanif Bhai asks about his sons. Sajid Bhai replies that his sons, Arif and Anwar, are returning soon after five years of studying in America. Hanif Bhai, interested, asks when he is getting his sons married, and Sajid Bhai replies that he is getting them married if he finds good matches for them, and tells Hanif Bhai to inform him is he has any matches in mind.

Munna is introduced now, sitting in front of a girls college. Some of the first comedy is introduced in this scene, when Munna teases a girl, and the girl calls him a name, and Munna says a funny comeback. After that, a prank takes place. This prank goes through the whole movie. One of Munna's classmates come to him and tells him that he teased his girl. Munna remembers and asks for the classmate's phone saying that his is out of battery. His classmate lends him the phone, and Munna dials a random number, and says "Is Farha there," knowing that the man on the other side of the line will get irritated because of the random calls. The man on the other line swears every word he says. Munna cuts the line and gives it to his classmate and says that connection is bad. Later on while Munna is driving away on his bike, someone calls the classmates phone, and when the classmate, naturally confused, picks up the phone, he hears all these swears being yelled at him.

After Munna, his friend, Pappu is introduced. Pappu is a ticket blacker in front of a very busy theater. He doesn't just want to sell the two tickets he has, he wants to sell them to girls more than boys, so that he and Munna can sit on the two seats next to them. When two men come seeking two tickets, he says he will sell for 120 rupees. The two men ask if they can buy it in 100 rupees, because they don't they have 50 rupees, and no change. Pappu tells them that he won't sell and that they look like royal beggars. Later on, two ladies come to buy the same tickets, and Pappu asks for the 120 rupees. They also say the same thing as the men, and Pappu gives them the tickets for 100 rupees. The two previous men are watching, and go to deal with Pappu. Again, Pappu insults them and tells them to leave, when Munna comes. Munna and Pappu both go to the theaters.

There is a small introduction for Hanif Bhai's two daughters, Reshma and Najma. Reshma is shown stealing money from the pocket of her own dad. Nazma is shown reading a Filmfare magazine and eating chips, when her mom calls her to do some work. Najma's reply is that she is to busy working on "college reports" and she complains about all the work she has to do. Hanif Bhai wants his daughters to marry rich NRI Indians, but Reshma and Najma love Munna and Pappu, and their dad doesn't know that.

Munna loves Reshma and Reshma loves Munna. Pappu loves Najma, but Pappu doesn't know if Najma feels the same about him. In front of the same girl's college, Pappu tells Najma how he feels about her and that he loves her, and runs away. Later on, you see Najma kiss the rose that Pappu handed her, indicating that she loves him too.

== Cast ==
- Mast Ali as Munna
- Aziz Naser as Pappu
- Dheer Charan Shrivastav as Hanif Bhai
- Vandana Gupta as Reshma
- Stuti Misra as Nazma
- Hari as Ajju Tehzab
- Raghu Karumanchi as Arif
- Basha as Anwar
- Baba Khan as Sajid Bhai
- RK as Gopal Yadav alias Mama
- Kota Srinivasa Rao as Das Anna (cameo)
- Nikhil Siddhartha as college boy (cameo)
- Alka as Hanif's wife
- Anupama Varma (item song)

== Box office ==
The movie was the second biggest Hyderabadi movie after The Angrez, as the genre was new and clicked with the audience.

== See also ==
- List of Hyderabadi-language films
- Hyderabad Nawabs 2
