= Kadam Rao Padam Rao =

Kadam Rao Padam Rao is the earliest available Urdu manuscript. An example of Deccani masnavi, it is composed of 4000 lines, written during 1421-1434 AD, by Fakhruddin Nizami of Bidar.

It contains a Sufi tale designed to describe the soul's present state and its liberation, in the form of an exciting story: King Kadam Rao wants to learn yoga. But the shrewd yogi bans the king's soul into a parrot, slips into the king's body and rules in his place. The vizier Padam Rao notices it, searches for the King, and finally finds and frees him.
