= The Angrez =

- Directed by: Kuntaa Nikkil
- Written by: Kuntaa Nikkil
- Produced by: M. Sridhar Rao
- Starring: See Cast
- Cinematography: Anji
- Music by: Mallinath Maruth
- Release date: 2 October 2005
- Running time: 110 minutes
- Country: India
- Languages: Dakhini; English

The Angrez (transl. 'The Englander') is a 2005 Indian Hyderabadi-language comedy film written and directed by Kuntaa Nikkil, who co-stars in the film alongside an ensemble cast. In this film, the word "Angrez" refers to Englanders and non-resident Indians. The film was a trend-setter at that time, as it was one of the first to effectively and humorously, often resorting to the slapstick kind, portray the dialect of the Old City, Hyderabad and the Hyderabadi tongue. The film also portrays the fascination for American materialism, the hype around the IT industry and the lifestyle and culture it has spawned.

== Plot ==
The movie revolves around three sets of people.

1. The Angrez – Two guys who come from the United States to serve in an IT company.
2. Ismail ‘Bhai’ & gang – A bunch of locals from the Old City Area
3. Mama a.k.a. Annaa & gang – Local gangsters

Two NRIs, Pranay and Rochak, come to Hyderabad from New Jersey to take up jobs in their friend's company and settle in Hyderabad. Based in the old city, Ismail bhai (Dheer Charan Srivastav) and the gang meet up near Charminar and start their daily routine with gossips, babble and talks of bravery. Ismail bhai is apparently the gang leader and his gang comprises Saleem ‘Pheku’ (Mast Ali) - a habitual liar, Jahangir – a self claimed hardcore gangster, Gafoor and Chaus who all follow Ismail Bhai throughout the film.

While visiting the old city, Pranay and Rochak meet Ismail's gang at a hotel in the old city. Ismail's gang gets into a spat with Pranay and Rochak. Rochak and Pranay are guided to safety by their guide as they are chased by the Ismail bhai gang. Pranay and Rochak are dating their office co-workers, while Ismail bhai and his gang keep planning a strategy to seek their revenge.

Meanwhile, Ramesh, Pranay's cousin (who is also their butler) colludes with Mama, the typical gangster of the Hyderabadi underworld, to kidnap Pranay for ransom. Mama and his goons take up the assignment and the plan is set in motion.

Ismail Bhai is still enraged as he believes that the harmless spat is now a matter worth dying for and is a matter of his izzat (honour). On the other side of the town, Mama and his gang enter the residence of the NRIs, at the same time the Ismail bhai gang after sniffing out their whereabouts go into the NRI's house at night to seek their revenge and restore Ismail bhai's image. Mama and gang mistakenly kidnap Rochak. Ismail Bhai and gang return from their mission failing as usual. Rochak finds out the mastermind behind the kidnapping and bribes the guard and warns Pranai of his cousin's intentions.

Ismail Bhai and Mama gang have a brush against each other. Pranay and Rochak succeed in making the two gangs fight against each other and manage their escape. As Mama and his gang is nabbed by the Hyderabad Police, Ismail bhai and gang returns to Charminar after being heavily assaulted by Mama and his goons. And life, in Hyderabadi style, goes on as usual for the Ismail Bhai's gang.

== Cast ==
- Kuntaa Nikkil as Pranay Nerella
- Ganesh Venkatraman as Rochak Suddala
- Mast Ali as Saleem Pheku
- Dheer Charan Srivastav as Ismail Bhai
- Aziz Naser as Jahangir
- RK as Mama
- Raghu Karumanchi as Nerella Ramesh, Pranay's cousin
- Tara D'Souza as Sheetal
- Soumya Bollapragada as Tanya
- Shehnaz as Lotus
- Jeevan Shekhar Reddy as Prasad, Pranai and Rochak's guide cum colleague
- Azam Shafi as Azam, Ismail Bhai's gang member
- Chaush as Chaush, Ismail Bhai's gang member

Uncredited

- Kranthi Kiran Kamaraju as Prakash
- Srikanth Iyengar as Raju, software company owner
- Jayalakshmi as Lakshmi, Sheetal and Tanya's office colleague

== Production ==
The basic idea for The Angrez came from a real life situation that Nikkil and 2 other friends encountered in Old City, Hyderabad. When a half-hour promo was shot on DV camera nobody was willing to produce the movie. Then Sreedhar Rao stepped forward and decided to produce the movie since he felt that the movie had highlighted the core culture of the city.

== Release and reception ==
The film was first released at a single screening at Rama Krishna theater in Hyderabad. The producer petitioned the Department of Tourism to promote the film to raise interest in the Hyderabad area. The directors and producers believe that this movie covers the entire Hyderabadi culture, right from bonalu to baraat, from biryani to the pub life. The five-minute rap song 'Hyderabadi Biryani' was shot in 77 different locations of Hyderabad like the Chudi Bazaar, Taramati Baradari and Tank Bund. The producers had to do a lot of running about since there were only a few takers. Released with just two prints, the film gradually headed for the fifth week and then was all set for a country wide opening.

== Influence ==
Though the movie failed to attract the mainstream film industry, it started off the infectious trend of making comedy movies based on the Hyderabadi culture. In a matter of a year and a half, there were about a half a dozen releases, but none of them quite succeeded in creating the effect and the charm of the original, though these movies were popular among the Old City residents. The success of The Angrez can be attributed to the spontaneity of the humour whereas in the movies that followed, the humour looks forced. The film not only gained popularity in Andhra Pradesh and the other parts of India but also among the large diaspora in the Middle-East and the US, attributed to the Internet and availability of original as well as unlicensed DVDs. With unauthorized DVDs being released in huge numbers, several raids were conducted and lakhs of illicit copies were recovered.

== Sequel ==
A sequel to the movie The Angrez 2 was released in the year 2015.

== See also ==
- List of Hyderabadi-language films
