= The Angrez 2 =

- Directed by: Kuntaa Nikkil
- Written by: Kuntaa Nikkil
- Produced by: Kuntaa Nikkil; M. Sridhar Rao
- Starring: Kuntaa Nikkil; Izeqiel McCoy; Dheer Charan Srivastav; Mast Ali
- Music by: Mallinath
- Release date: 15 May 2015 (Hyderabad)
- Running time: 101 minutes
- Country: India
- Languages: Hyderabadi Urdu; Telugu; English; Hindi

The Angrez 2 is a 2015 Indian slapstick comedy film written and directed by Kuntaa Nikkil. It is a sequel to his 2005 film The Angrez. Several actors including Dheer Charan Srivastav and Mast Ali reprise their roles from the earlier film.

== Plot ==
In a sequel to The Angrez, the events brought out in that first film continue. The Angrez (Pranai and Peter) is being chased by the Hyderabadi old city guys to take revenge on Ismail Bhai. Hyderabadi guys kidnap one of the foreign ladies instead of Pranai (Kuntaa Nikkil) and how the events proceed forms the rest of the story of the movie.

== Cast ==
- Kuntaa Nikkil as Pranay Nerella
- Izeqiel McCoy as Peter Wilson (credited as Zeq McCoy)
- Dheer Charan Srivastav as Ismail Bhai
- Mast Ali as Salim Pheku
- Raghu Karumanchi as Nerella Ramesh, Pranay's cousin brother
- Tanuja as Melody
- Anu Varma as Sulochana
- Jeevan Shekhar Reddy as Prasad
- Munna as Dubai Pasha
- Logo as Lobo
- Chaush as Chaush
- Azam as Azam
- Venu as Charminar Anna

== Production ==
In 2012, Nikkil got arrested for borrowing Rs 50 lakh and failing to repay it.
