= Mathnawi =

Poetic genre

Mathnawi (/ˌmæθnəˈwiː/ MATH-nə-WEE), (Note: Arabic: مثنوي, romanized: manawiyy maṯnawiyy, Arabic pronunciation: [mæθnæwijː]) also spelled masnavi, (Note: Persian: مثنوی, romanized: maṯnawī, mas̱nawi, Early New Persian pronunciation [maθ.na.ˈwiː], Classical (as well as Dari) Persian pronunciation [mas.na.ˈwiː], Iranian Persian pronunciation: [mæs.næ.viː]) mesnevi (Note: Turkish: mesnevi, Turkish pronunciation: [mesneˈʋi]) or masnawi, (Note: Hindi: मसनवी, Urdu: مثنوی, romanized: mas̱navi, Hindustani pronunciation: [məsnəˈʋiː]) is a kind of poem written in rhyming couplets, or more specifically "a poem based on independent, internally rhyming lines". Most mathnawi poems follow a meter of eleven, or occasionally ten, syllables, but have no limit in their length. Typical mathnawi poems consist of an indefinite number of couplets, with the rhyme scheme aa/bb/cc.

Mathnawi poems have been written in Arabic, Persian, Turkish, Kurdish and Urdu cultures. Certain Persian mathnawi poems, such as Rumi's Masnavi, have had a special religious significance in Sufism. Other influential writings include the poems of Ghazali and ibn Arabi. Mathnawis are closely tied to Islamic theology, philosophy, and legends, and cannot be understood properly without knowledge of it.

== Arabic mathnawi ==
Arabic mathnawi poetry, also known as muzdawij (Arabic: مزدوج, romanized: muzdawij, lit. 'doubled', referring to the internal rhyme scheme of the lines), was popularized during the Abbasid era. Unlike the older poetic styles in Arabic, mathnawi verses are not monorhymes. Instead, they include an internal rhyme scheme within each verse (or Arabic: بيت, romanized: bayt) with an extensive use of alliteration and follow a specific meter. Arabic mathnawi poetry is similar to the Persian, Kurdish, Urdu and Turkish equivalents, though with one major difference: most muzdawij poems follow an aaa/bbb/ccc pattern, while the other mathnawi poems follow an aa/bb/cc pattern.

== Persian masnavi ==
Persian masnavi poems strictly adhere to a meter of 11 syllables (occasionally ten). While the length of a masnavi is not prescribed and is therefore unlimited, most of the better known masnavi are within a range of 2,000–9,000 verses. The first known masnavi poem was written during the Samanid period (4th–10th centuries). Despite certain dates indicating a possibility otherwise, modern scholars believe that it is a continuation of an Iranian verse form, not of its Arabic counterpart. (Note: There is some debate, as the word "mathnawi" is derived from Arabic, but most scholars believe that the Persians coined the word themselves.)

Masnavi are usually associated with the didactic and romantic genres, but are not limited to them. There is a great variety among Persian masnavi, but there are several conventions that can help a reader recognize a masnavi poem. Most masnavi have a distinction between the introductory and body paragraphs (although it is not always easy to determine where that is), praise of the one God and prayers, a eulogy of the Prophet, reflections on the value of poetry, and occasionally a description of an object as a significant symbol.

Certain Persian masnavis have had a special religious significance in Sufism, such as Rumi's Masnawi-i Ma'nawi, which consists of 6 books/25,000 verses and has been used in prayer among many Sufis, such as the Whirling Dervishes. While some Islamic legalists find the practice unconscionable, the Sufi scholar and jurist Abu Hamid al-Ghazali supported the use of poetry as worship.

In the 21st century, Ahmad NikTalab has been one of the expert poets of Persian masnavi.

== Turkish mesnevi ==
Turkish mesnevi developed during the 8th to 14th centuries. Persian masnavi influenced Turkish authors, as many Turkish mesnevis were, at first, creative translations and adaptations of Persian masnavi. The oldest known Turkish mesnevi is a didactic poem called Kutadgu Bilig.

Turkish mesnevi are strongly driven by their plot, and are usually categorized into three genres: mutaqarib (heroic), ramal (religio-didactic), and hazaj (romantic). Some mesnevi were written with an understanding that the audience would appreciate the importance of the subject of the poem, but some were also written purely for entertainment purposes.

Mesnevi remained prominent in Turkish literature until the end of the Ottoman Empire, when it began to transform into more conversational and rhetorical literature. Few Turkish mesnevis have been translated into other modern languages.

== Urdu masnawi ==
Urdu masnawi are usually divided into three categories: early, middle, and late.

Early Urdu masnawi began during the 11th to 17th centuries. In the beginning of this period, many masnawi were religious in nature, but then grew to include romantic, heroic, and even secular stories. Early Urdu masnawi were influenced by Dakhini literature, as well as Persian masnavi. Because of this influence, many early Urdu masnawi were translations of Persian masnavi, although there are some original early Urdu masnawis.

Middle Urdu masnawi became prominent during the 12th to 18th centuries, when Urdu literature broke away from the Dakhini tradition. During the 12th to 18th centuries, romantic masnawi became very popular. Another new convention that appeared in middle Urdu masnawi was authors using their own personal experiences as a subject for their poems.

Modern Urdu masnawi began during the 13th to 19th centuries, during a time of literary reform. Masnawi as a whole became much shorter, and the traditional meters stopped being observed. These masnawis deal more with everyday subjects, as well as providing a medium for children's poetry. A well-known masnawi writer in Urdu in recent times was Allama Dr. Syed Ali Imam Zaidi Gauhar Lakhnavi (great-grandson of Mir Babar Ali Anees).

== See also ==
- Diwan (poetry)

== Literature ==
- Bruijn, J.T.P. de; Flemming, B.; Rahman, Munibur (8 April 2010). "Mathnawī". In Bearman, P.; Bianquis, Th.; Bosworth, C. E.; Donzel, E. van; Heinrichs, W. P. (eds.). Encyclopaedia of Islam (2nd ed.). Brill Online.
