= Deccani language =

Indo-Aryan language spoken in India

Deccani
- دکنی
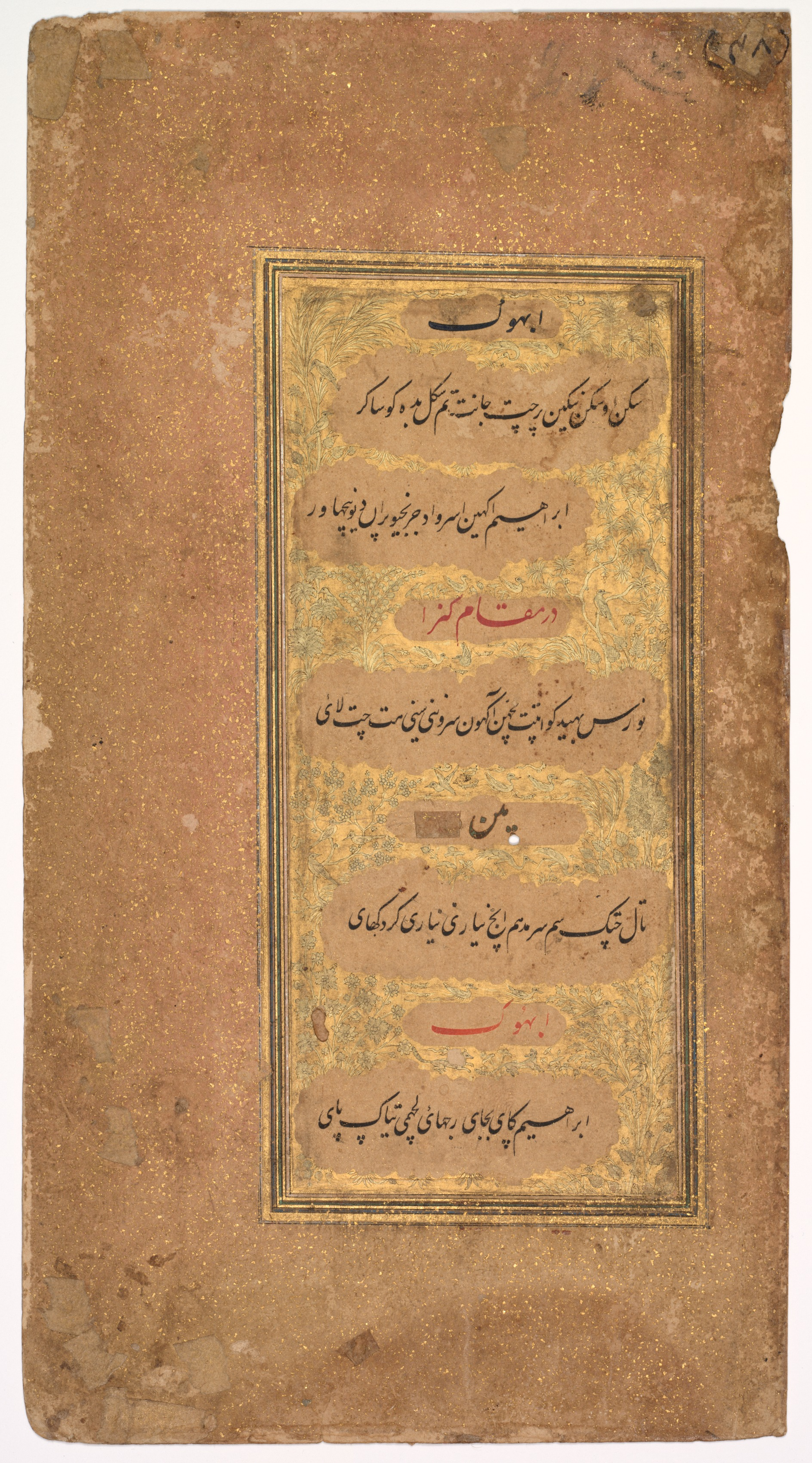
- A folio from the Kitab-i-Navras, a collection of Deccani poetry attributed to the Adil Shahi king Ibrahim Adil Shah II (16th-17th centuries)
- Native to: India
- Region: Deccan (Maharashtra, Karnataka, Telangana, Andhra Pradesh, Tamil Nadu, Goa)
- Ethnicity: Deccanis
- Language family: Indo-European: Indo-Iranian; Indo-Aryan; Central Zone; Western Hindi; Hindustani; Deccani
- Standard forms: Standard Urdu
- Dialects: Hyderabadi; Bangalori; Chennai; Aurangabadi
- Writing system: Perso-Arabic script

Language codes
- ISO 639-3: –
- Glottolog: dakh1244

Deccani (دکنی dakanī) (Note: Deccani is spelled variously as Dakni, Dakani, Dakhni, Dakhani, Dakhini, Dakkhani, Dakkhini and Dakkani) also known as Deccani Urdu, Deccani Hindi, or Deccani Hindustani is an Indo-Aryan language variety based on a form of Hindustani spoken in the Deccan region of western, central, and southern India and is the native language of the Deccani people. The historical form of Deccani sparked the development of Urdu literature during the late-Mughal period. Deccani arose as a lingua franca under the Delhi Sultanate and Bahmani Sultanates, as trade and migration from the north introduced Hindustani to the Deccan. It later developed a literary tradition under the patronage of the Deccan Sultanates. Deccani itself came to influence standard Urdu and later modern standard Hindi.

Deccani has an Indo-Aryan core vocabulary, though it incorporated loanwords from Persian, which was the official language of the Deccan Sultanates. Additionally, Deccani differs from northern Hindustani sociolects due to archaisms retained from the medieval era, as well as a convergence with and loanwords from the Deccan's regional languages like Marathi, Kannada, Telugu, Tamil spoken in the states of Maharashtra, Karnataka, Andhra Pradesh, Telangana, and Tamil Nadu. Deccani has been increasingly influenced by Standard Urdu, which serves as its formal register.

There are four primary dialects of Deccani spoken today: Hyderabadi, Bangalori Deccani, Aurangabadi Deccani, and Chennai Deccani.

The term "Deccani" and its variants are often used in two different contexts: a historical one, referring to the medieval-era literary predecessor of Hindi-Urdu; and an oral one, referring to the various Deccani dialects spoken in many parts of the Deccan today. Both contexts have intricate historical ties.

== History ==
=== Origin ===
As a predecessor of modern Hindustani, Deccani has its origins in the contact dialect spoken around Delhi then known as Dehlavi and now called Old Hindi. In the early 14th century, this dialect was introduced in the Deccan region through the military exploits of Alauddin Khalji. In 1327 AD, Muhammad bin Tughluq shifted his Sultanate's capital from Delhi to Daulatabad (near present-day Aurangabad, Maharashtra), causing a mass migration; governors, soldiers and common people moved south, bringing the dialect with them. At this time (and for the next few centuries) the cultural centres of the northern Indian subcontinent were under Persian linguistic hegemony.

The Bahmani Sultanate was formed in 1347 AD with Daulatabad as its capital. This was later moved to Gulbarga and once again, in 1430, to Bidar. By this time, the dialect had acquired the name Dakhni, from the name of the region itself, and had become a lingua franca for the linguistically diverse people of the region, primarily where the Muslims had settled permanently. The Bahmanids greatly promoted Persian, and did not show any notable patronage for Deccani. However, their 150-year rule saw the burgeoning of a local Deccani literary culture outside the court, as religious texts were made in the language. The Sufis in the region (such as Shah Miranji) were an important vehicle of Deccani; they used it in their preachings since regional languages were more accessible (than Persian) to the general population. This era also saw production of the masnavi Kadam Rao Padam Rao by Fakhruddin Nizami in the region around Bidar. It is the earliest available manuscript of the Hindavi/Dehlavi/Deccani language, and contains loanwords from local languages such as Telugu and Marathi. Digby suggests that it was not produced in courtly settings.

=== Growth ===
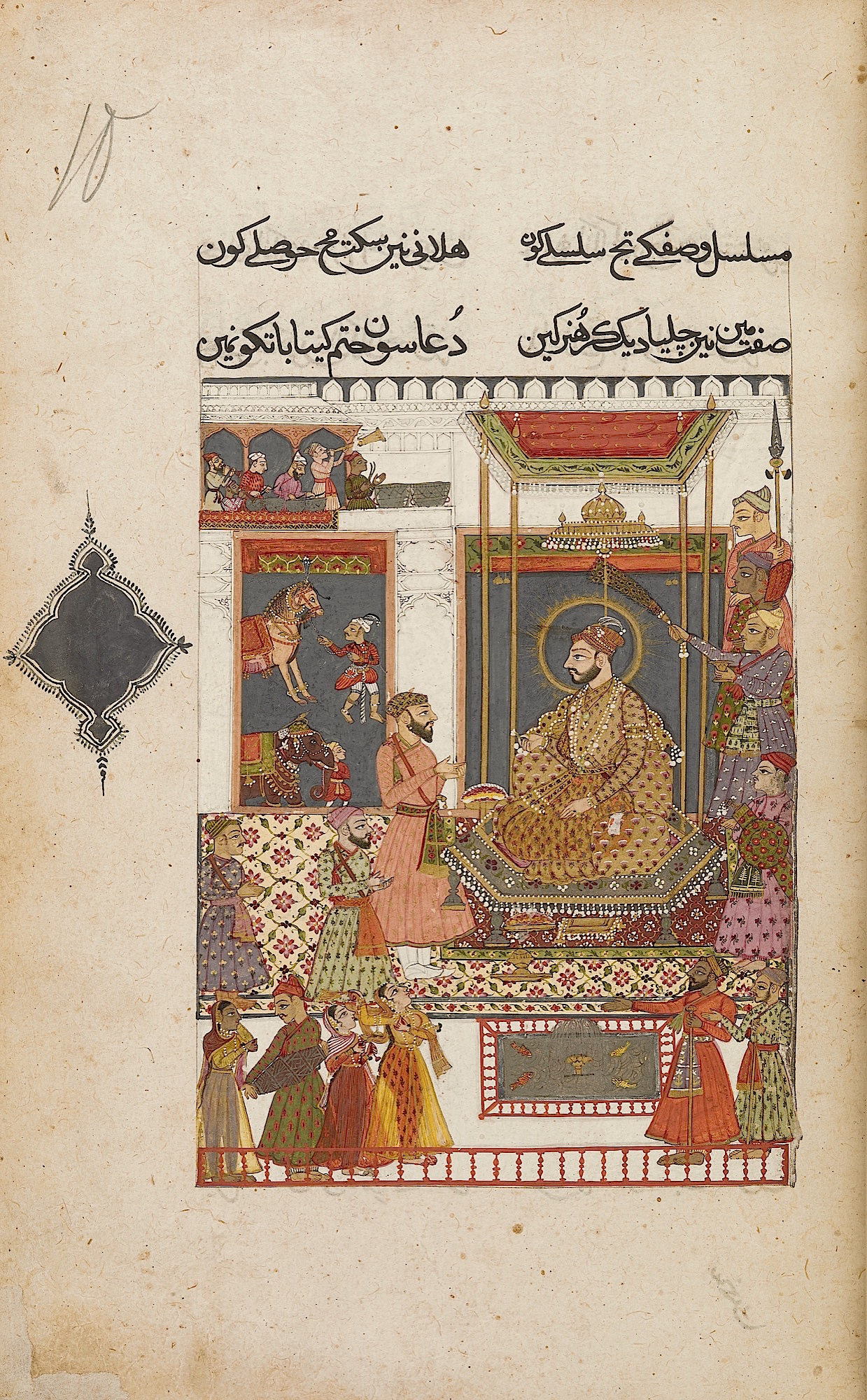
Illustrated page from ibn-e-Nishati's "Phulban" (Flower Garden), a Deccani rendition of an unknown Persian work. Written under the patronage of Abdullah Qutb Shah, depicted here seated on a throne.

In the early 16th century, the Bahmani Sultanate splintered into more assimilated Deccan Sultanates such as the Golconda and Bijapur Sultanates, which sponsored, blended and developed humanistic disciplines of local languages into Indo-Persian culture. According to Shaheen and Shahid, Golconda was the literary home of Asadullah Wajhi (author of Sab Ras), ibn-e-Nishati (Phulban), and Ghwasi (Tutinama). Bijapur played host to Hashmi Bijapuri, San‘ati, and Mohammed Nusrati over the years.

The rulers themselves participated in these cultural developments. Muhammad Quli Qutb Shah of the Golconda Sultanate wrote poetry in Deccani, which was compiled into a kulliyyāt. It is widely considered to be the earliest Urdu poetry of a secular nature. Ibrahim Adil Shah II of the Bijapur Sultanate produced Kitab-e-Navras (Book of the Nine Rasas), a work of musical poetry written entirely in Deccani. The mathnawi Pem Nem was also compiled during his reign.

Although the poets of this era were well-versed in Persian, they were characterised by a preference for indigenous cultures, and a drive to stay independent of esoteric language. As a result, the language they cultivated emphasised the Sanskritic roots of Deccani without overshadowing it, and borrowed from neighbouring languages (especially Marathi; Matthews states that Dravidian influence was much less). In this regard, Shaheen and Shahid note that literary Deccani has historically been very close to spoken Deccani, unlike the northern tradition that has always exhibited diglossia. Poet San'ati is a particular example of such conscious efforts to retain simplicity:

rakhiyā kam sanskrit ke is me bōl,
adīk bōlne te rakhiyā hũ amōl;

jise fārsī kā na kuch gyān he
sō dakhnī zabān us kō āsān he

Translation:

I have restricted the use of Sanskrit words,
And made it free of unnecessary talk.

Those who have no knowledge of Persian;
For them Dakhnī is a readily understood language.

As the language of court and culture, Persian nevertheless served as the model for poetic forms, and a good amount of Persian and Arabic vocabulary was present in the works of these writers. Hence Deccani attempted to strike a balance between Indian and Persian influences, though it did always retain mutual intelligibility with the northern Dehlavi. This contributed to the cultivation of a distinct Deccani identity, separate from the rulers from the north; many poets proudly extolled the Deccan region and its culture.

Hence, Deccani experienced cultivation into a literary language under the Sultanates, alongside its usage as a common vernacular. It also continued to be used by saints and Sufis for preaching. However, the Sultanates did not use Deccani for official purposes, preferring the prestige language Persian as well as regional languages like Marathi, Kannada, and Telugu.

=== Decline ===
The Mughal conquest of the Deccan by Aurangzeb in the 17th century connected the southern regions of the subcontinent to the north, and introduced a hegemony of northern tastes. This began the decline of Deccani poetry, as literary patronage in the region decreased. The sociopolitical context of the period is reflected in Hashmi Bijapuri's poem, composed two years after the fall of Bijapur, in a time when many southern poets were pressured to change their language and style for patronage:

tuje chākrī kya tu apnīch bōl,
terā shēr dakhnī hai dakhnīch bōl

Translation:

Why bother about patrons, in your own words do state;
Your poetry is Dakhni, and only in it should you narrate

The literary centres of the Deccan had been replaced by the capital of the Mughals, so poets migrated to Delhi for better opportunities. A notable example is that of Wali Deccani (1667–1707), who adapted his Deccani sensibilities to the northern style and produced a divan in this variety. His work inspired the Persianate poets of the north to compose in the local dialect, which in their hands became an intermediate predecessor of Hindustani known as Rekhta. This accelerated the downfall of Deccani literature, as Rekhta came to dominate the competing dialects of Mughal Hindustan. The advent of the Asaf Jahis slowed this down, but despite their patronage of regional culture, Deccani’s literary tradition died. However, the spoken variety has lived on in the Deccani Muslims, retaining some of its historical features and continuing to be influenced by the neighbouring Dravidian languages.

== Phonology ==
=== Consonants ===
		Labial	Dental/ Alveolar	Retroflex	Post-alv./ Palatal	Velar	Glottal
Nasal	voiced	m	n	ɳ		ŋ	
Nasal	breathy	mʱ	nʱ				
Stop/ Affricate	voiceless	p	t	ʈ	tʃ	k	
Stop/ Affricate	aspirated	pʰ	tʰ	ʈʰ	tʃʰ	kʰ	
Stop/ Affricate	voiced	b	d	ɖ	dʒ	ɡ	
Stop/ Affricate	breathy	bʱ	dʱ	ɖʱ	dʒʱ	ɡʱ	
Fricative	voiceless	f	s		ʃ	x	h
Fricative	voiced		z			ɣ	h
Trill/Tap	voiced		r	ɽ			
Trill/Tap	breathy		rʱ				
Approximant	voiced	ʋ	l	ɭ	j		
Approximant	breathy	ʋʱ	lʱ		jʱ		

- /h/ can be heard as either voiceless [h] or voiced [ɦ] across dialects.
- The /q/ of Urdu is merged with /x/.

=== Vowels ===
	Front	Central	Back
High	iː		uː
High	ɪ		ʊ
Mid	e	ə	o
Low		aː	

- /e, o/ can have lax allophones of [ɛ, ɔ] when preceding consonants in medial position.
- Diphthong sounds include /əi, əe, əu, əo/.
- /əi/ can be heard as [æ] after /h/.
- /əu/ can be heard as [ɔː] in initial positions.

== Modern era ==
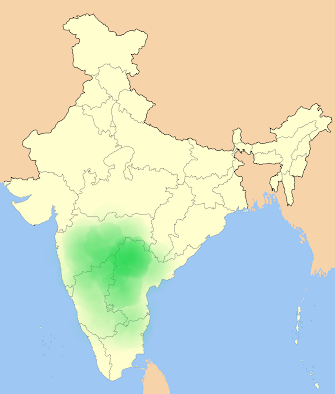
Areas where Deccani is spoken.

Deccani today is spoken natively by many Muslims from Karnataka, Telangana, Andhra Pradesh, and Maharashtra (who are known as the Deccanis). It is considered to be the modern, spoken variety of the historical Deccani, and inherits many features from it. The demise of the literary tradition has meant that Deccani uses standard Urdu as its formal register (i.e. for writing, news, education etc).

=== Geographical distribution ===
Deccani is spoken in many urban areas of the Deccan region, especially those with large Muslim populations such as Mumbai, Hyderabad, Bangalore, Aurangabad, Bijapur, Solapur Amravati, Gulbarga, Vijayawada, and Mysore. In addition to members of the Deccani community, some Hindu Rajputs and Marathas in the Deccan speak Deccani as well.

=== Features ===
Deccani retains some features of medieval Hindustani that have disappeared in contemporary Hindi-Urdu. It is also distinguished by grammar and vocabulary influences from Marathi, Kannada, and Telugu, due to its prolonged use as a lingua franca in the Deccan. Below is a non-exhaustive list of its unique features, with standard Urdu equivalents:

Deccani	Standard Urdu equivalent	Notes
mai, tu (southern dialects)	ma͠i, tū	First and second person singular pronouns
hame, tume (southern dialects)	ham, āp	First and second person plural pronouns
kane, kan	pās	Possessive marker
un, in, une, ine	us, is	Third person singular pronouns
uno, uno logã, unõ	un, un lōg, woh log	Third person plural pronouns
"sabaan"(southern dialects)	"kal"	For the word "tomorrow", northern dialects use the same word as Standard Urdu
mer(e)kū, ter(e)kū (northern dialects)	mujhe, tujhe	First and second person possessive pronouns often used with postpositions (mera + ku, tera + ku)
suffix -ã [ãː] (logã, mardã)	-õ, -ẽ	Plural marker
ap(p)an	āp lōg	Third person plural pronoun, often used in first person as well
suffix -ich [it͡ʃʰ] (mai idharich hũ)	hī (mẽ idhar hī hũ)	Emphasis marker, Matthews comments that this is "probably from Marathi"
kaiku, ki	kyũ	'why'
po (southern dialects)	par, pē	'on' or 'at' (postposition)
suffix -ĩgā (kal jaĩgā, ab karĩgā)	-ẽge (kal jāyẽge, ab karẽge)	Plural future tense marker
sangāt	ke sātʰ	'with', both are used in Deccani
nakko	mat/na (imperative), nahĩ cāhiye (first person negative)	From Marathi
kate	lagta hē	'it seems' or 'apparently'
sō	sō	Common to Deccani and Urdu but largely restricted to classic literature and rarely used in the standard spoken registers of the latter Still commonly used in Deccani, roughly meaning 'that', 'which', or 'hence'
suffix -ko (jāko, dʰōko, āko)	suffix -kē or -kar (jākē/jākar, dʰōkē/dʰōkar/, ākē/ākar)	Conjunctive participle, all three are used in Deccani
kh ( خ) [x/χ]	( ق) [q]	Deccani speakers have fully merged q with kh
ai (ـَے) [aɪ], au (ـَو) [aʊ] (southern dialects)	ai (ـَے) [əe~ɛː], au (ـَو) [ɔː]	Southern dialects of Deccani preserve diphthongs where northern dialects and standard Urdu have shifted to open-mid vowels

These features are used to different degrees among speakers, as there tends to be regional variation. Mustafa names some varieties of Deccani as "Telugu Dakkhni, Kannada Dakkhni, and Tamil Dakkhni", based on their influence from the dominant Dravidian language in the spoken region. He further divides Telugu Deccani into two linguistic categories, corresponding to Andhra Pradesh, which he says has more Telugu influence; and Telangana, with more influence from standard Urdu. The latter is seen especially in Hyderabad.

Deccani's use of Urdu as a standard register, and contact with Hindustani (widespread in India), has led to some of its distinctive features disappearing.

=== Culture ===
Deccani finds a cultural core in and around Hyderabad. Deccani in Hyderabad has found a vehicle of expression through humour and wit, which manifests in events called "Mazahiya Mushaira", poetic symposiums with comedic themes. An example of Deccani, spoken in such a context at Hyderabad:

buzdil hai woh jo jīte jī marne se ḍar gayā
ek mai-ich thā jo kām hī kuch aur kar gayā
jab maut āko mereku karne lagī salām
maĩ walaikum salām bola aur mar gayā.

— Ghouse Khamakha
Translation:

It's a coward who fears death while still alive,
It was but me who did something different altogether
When Death came to me and said "salam",
I said "walaikum salam" and died

Additionally, the Deccani film industry (also called Dollywood) is based in Hyderabad and produces movies in Deccani, especially the Hyderabadi dialect.

== Legacy ==
=== Urdu ===
Deccani is often considered a predecessor of Urdu. The Deccani literary tradition is largely responsible for the development of modern Urdu since contact with southern poets led to a shift in northern tastes and the development of Urdu as a literary language. Deccani also imparted the practice of writing the local vernacular in the Perso-Arabic script, which eventually became the standard practice for Urdu all over the Indian subcontinent.

== See also ==
- Hyderabadi Urdu
- Urdu in Aurangabad
- Nawayathi (Kumta, Honnavar, Bhatkal)
- Deccani Muslims
- Deccani film industry
- Deccani Marathi, a dialect of Marathi-Konkani which goes by the same name

== Bibliography ==
- Dua, Hans R. (2012), "Hindi-Urdu as a pluricentric language", in Michael Clyne (ed.), Pluricentric Languages: Differing Norms in Different Nations, Walter de Gruyter, ISBN 978-3-11-088814-0
- Rahman, Tariq (2011), From Hindi to Urdu: A Social and Political History (PDF), Oxford University Press, ISBN 978-0-19-906313-0, archived from the original (PDF) on 10 October 2014
- Mustafa, K.S (2008), "Dakkhni", in Prakāśaṃ, Vennelakaṇṭi (ed.), Encyclopaedia of the Linguistic Sciences: Issues and Theories, Allied Publishers, pp. 185–186, ISBN 978-1139465502
- Shaheen, Shagufta; Shahid, Sajjad (2018), "The Unique Literary Traditions of Dakhnī", in Azam, Kousar J (ed.), Languages and Literary Cultures in Hyderabad, Routledge, ISBN 9781351393997
- Sharma, Ram (1964), दक्खिनी हिन्दी का उद्भव और विकास (PDF) (in Hindi), Allahabad: Hindi Sahitya Sammelan
- Matthews, David J. (1976). Dakani Language and Literature (Thesis). SOAS University of London.
