= PK (soundtrack) =

Soundtrack album by Shantanu Moitra, Ajay–Atul and Ankit Tiwari
- Released: 5 November 2014
- Recorded: 2014
- Genre: Feature film soundtrack
- Length: 30:17
- Language: Hindi
- Label: T-Series

Shantanu Moitra chronology
Mardaani (2014)	PK (2014)	Wazir (2016)

Ajay–Atul chronology
Lai Bhaari (2014)	PK (2014)	Brothers (2015)

Ankit Tiwari chronology
Singham Returns (2014)	PK (2014)	Alone (2015)

Singles from PK
- 1. "Tharki Chokro" Released: 24 October 2014; 2. "Love Is a Waste of Time" Released: 31 October 2014; 3. "Nanga Punga Dost" Released: 1 November 2014; 4. "Chaar Kadam" Released: 2 November 2014

PK is the soundtrack to the 2014 film of the same name directed by Rajkumar Hirani. The soundtrack featured seven tracks—four songs and a theme music composed by Shantanu Moitra, and one song each composed by Ajay–Atul and Ankit Tiwari. Swanand Kirkire penned four songs, while Manoj Muntashir and Amitabh Varma penned one song each. The soundtrack was released on 5 November 2014, preceded by four singles: "Tharki Chokro," "Love Is a Waste of Time", "Nanga Punga Dost," and "Chaar Kadam".

== Background ==
PK's music is contributed by Shantanu Moitra, who had regularly collaborated with Hirani since Lage Raho Munna Bhai (2006) and 3 Idiots (2009). Moitra composed four tracks including a theme music, while Ajay–Atul and Ankit Tiwari contributed one track each. According to Moitra, all of his compositions in the film were "quirky" and "melodious".

The track "Nanga Punga Dost" was conceptualized even before the first look poster, in which Aamir is posing nude with a strategically placed vintage boombox. The track was particularly based on the aforementioned sequence, which Moitra described it as "amazing, crazy and wild". The track had two different lyrics, the first verse was featured in the introductory scene of Anushka Sharma, while the original version of the song was used in the end credits.

"Chaar Kadam" is a romantic number picturised on Sushant Singh Rajput and Anushka Sharma and was shot in Bruges, Belgium, within 2–3 days. Moitra described the song's picturization is similar to the romantic songs of yesteryear Hindi films, citing Silsila (1981) as an example. The song was recorded by Shaan and Shreya Ghoshal in May 2013. "Bhagawan Hai Kahan Re Tu" is a semi-classical number performed by Sonu Nigam, picturized on the search of God.

== Release ==
"Tharki Chokro" was the first single to be released from the album on 24 October 2014. It was preceded at an event held at Delhi, with the presence of Khan, Hirani, Ajay–Atul. The second song "Love Is a Waste of Time" was released on 31 October 2014. The music videos for "Nanga Punga Dost" and "Chaar Kadam" were released on 1 and 2 November, respectively, whereas the full-length versions of those songs released along with the album on 5 November 2014.

== Track listing ==
No.	Title	Lyrics	Music	Singer(s)	Length
1.	"Tharki Chokro"	Swanand Kirkire	Ajay–Atul	Swaroop Khan	4:55
2.	"Love Is a Waste of Time"	Amitabh Varma	Shantanu Moitra	Sonu Nigam, Shreya Ghoshal	4:30
3.	"Nanga Punga Dost"	Swanand Kirkire	Shantanu Moitra	Shreya Ghoshal	4:46
4.	"Chaar Kadam"	Swanand Kirkire	Shantanu Moitra	Shaan, Shreya Ghoshal	4:20
5.	"Bhagwan Hai Kahan Re Tu"	Swanand Kirkire	Shantanu Moitra	Sonu Nigam	5:12
6.	"Dil Darbadar"	Manoj Muntashir	Ankit Tiwari	Ankit Tiwari	5:31
7.	"PK Dance Theme"	—	Shantanu Moitra	Instrumental	2:23
8.	"Khuda"	Shiraz Uppal	Shatanu Moirta	Hareem Farooq and Shiraz Uppal	7:50
Total length:					30:17

== Reception ==
Rajiv Vijayakar of Bollywood Hungama described it as a "competent and neat album" from the Hirani–Moitra collaboration.

Devesh Sharma of Filmfare in a three-and-a-half-star review said that "Chaar Kadam and Tharki chokro are your takeaways from this largely situational album." Critic based at The Indian Express complimented the music being a "refreshing change compared to the rap and hip hop beats we hear today." Joginder Tuteja of Rediff.com wrote "PK's music starts and ends well, but the middle portion is barely passable" and gave two stars to the album. Swapnil Raje of IBNLive wrote "PK is a score that has its moments but it's not the score of the year."
