= PK3 =

PK3 may refer to:

- PK3 (file extension), a file extension in the id Tech 3 game engine
- PK3 Paris, a clothing brand made by French footballer Presnel Kimpembe
- "PK3" (song), an alternative name for the Hindi song Nanga Punga Dost in the 2014 Bollywood film PK

== See also ==
- PK-3 Plus (ISS experiment), a joint Russian-German laboratory
- PK-35 (disambiguation)
- PK (disambiguation)
