= List of shipwrecks in August 1945 =

The list of shipwrecks in August 1945 includes ships sunk, foundered, grounded, or otherwise lost during August 1945.

== 1 August ==
List of shipwrecks: 2 August 1945
Ship	State	Description
Gyoraitei No. 102	Imperial Japanese Navy	World War II: The Gyoraitei No. 102/TM 4-class motor torpedo boat was sunk or heavily damaged by Consolidated B-24 Liberator aircraft at Nagasaki, Japan.
Unidentified coastal trading vessel	Unknown	World War II: The coaster was shelled and sunk in the Strait of Malacca off the Jumpul Bank (03°06′N 99°58′E) by HMS Seadog and HMS Shalimar (both Royal Navy). Shalimar picked up survivors including her captain.

== 2 August ==
List of shipwrecks: 2 August 1945
Ship	State	Description
Ajudante	Brazil	The passenger river steamer sank quickly after being cut in two in collision with the gunboat ARC Cartagena (Colombian National Navy) in Brazilian waters on the Amazon River, near to Leticia, Colombia. Of 101 people on board, 57 died.
Ariel	United Kingdom	The 108.5-foot (33.1 m), 174-ton trawler was sunk in a collision with Benledi (United Kingdom) in thick fog southwest of Chicken Rock Lighthouse, Calf of Man. Benledi rescued her crew.
HMS LCV 802	Royal Navy	The landing craft vehicle (8/11 t, 1943) was lost.
Tencho Maru	Imperial Japanese Army	World War II: The Tencho Maru-class transport ship (a.k.a. Tentyo Maru) was torpedoed and sunk off Billiton Island in the Java Sea (05°07′N 106°05′E) by HMS Tiptoe and HMS Trump (both Royal Navy). 107 military passengers, 2 gunners and 12 crewmen were killed.
Unknown barge	Unknown	World War II: The barge was shelled and sunk in the Strait of Malacca near the mouth of the Burnam River in shallow water by HMS Seadog and HMS Shalimar (both Royal Navy).
Unidentified cargo ship	Japan	World War II: Carrying a cargo of coffee, the 20-gross register ton coastal cargo ship was sunk by gunfire in the Gulf of Siam by the submarine USS Bugara (United States Navy) after Bugara removed her crew. Bugara later released her crew.
Unidentified cargo ship	Unidentified	World War II: The 18-gross register ton coastal cargo ship was sunk by gunfire in the Gulf of Siam by the submarine USS Bugara (United States Navy).
Unidentified schooner	Unidentified	World War II: During a voyage to Singapore carrying a cargo of miscellaneous gear, the 211-gross register ton schooner was sunk by gunfire in the Gulf of Siam by the submarine USS Bugara (United States Navy) after Bugara removed her crew. Bugara later released her crew.
Unidentified schooner	Imperial Japanese Navy	World War II: On a voyage from Singapore, the 180-gross register ton schooner was sunk by gunfire in the Gulf of Siam by the submarine USS Bugara (United States Navy).
Unidentified schooner	Unidentified	World War II: The 117-gross register ton schooner was sunk by gunfire in the Gulf of Siam by the submarine USS Bugara (United States Navy).
Unidentified schooner	Japan	World War II: The 150-gross register ton schooner was sunk by gunfire in the Gulf of Siam by the submarine USS Bugara (United States Navy).
Unidentified tugboat	Flag unknown	World War II: The tug was shelled and sunk in the Strait of Malacca near the mouth of the Burnam River in shallow water by HMS Seadog and HMS Shalimar (both Royal Navy).
Various boats	Unidentified	World War II: Various boats carrying pirates were destroyed by gunfire in the Gulf of Siam by the submarine USS Bugara (United States Navy) when they approached Bugara in pursuit of six large Malayan canoes fleeing from them. Bugara had stopped the canoes to inspect them.

== 3 August ==
List of shipwrecks: 3 August 1945
Ship	State	Description
Blush Rose	United Kingdom	The coaster (645 GRT, 1913) collided with Glaucus (United Kingdom) off Holyhead, Anglesey and sank. All 15 crew were rescued by Glaucus.
CH-42	Imperial Japanese Navy	World War II: The submarine chaser was torpedoed and sunk in the Pacific Ocean east of Honshu by USS Gato (United States Navy).
Junk No. 2218	Imperial Japanese Navy	World War II: The 100-gross register ton junk was sunk by gunfire in the Gulf of Siam by the submarine USS Bugara (United States Navy) after Bugara removed her crew.
Pa-109	Imperial Japanese Navy	World War II: The patrol boat was torpedoed and sunk in the Java Sea by HMS Tiptoe and HMS Trump (both Royal Navy).
Tencho Maru	Japan	World War II: The transport was torpedoed and sunk in the South China Sea off Billiton Island (03°07′N 107°02′E) by HMS Tiptoe (Royal Navy).
Unidentified barge	Imperial Japanese Navy	World War II: The armed Daihatsu barge was sunk by HMAS Stawell (Royal Australian Navy) in the Molucca Islands area.
Unidentified cargo ship	Unidentified	World War II: The 56-gross register ton small cargo ship, known to the Americans as a "sea truck," was sunk by gunfire in the Gulf of Siam by the submarine USS Bugara (United States Navy) after Bugara removed her crew.

== 4 August ==
List of shipwrecks: 4 August 1945
Ship	State	Description
CHa-178	Imperial Japanese Navy	World War II: The CHa-1-class submarine chaser was damaged in Shimonoseki Straits by a mine and was beached.
T-152	Imperial Japanese Navy	The No. 103-class landing ship sank in heavy weather south of the Bonin Islands, north east of Ogasawara Minami.
Unidentified cargo ship	Unidentified	World War II: The 50-gross register ton coastal cargo ship was sunk by gunfire in the Gulf of Siam by the submarine USS Bugara (United States Navy).
Unidentified junk	Unidentified	World War II: The 300-gross register ton junk was sunk by gunfire in the Gulf of Siam by the submarine USS Bugara (United States Navy).
Unidentified schooner	Unidentified	World War II: Carrying a cargo of copra and coconut oil, the 450-gross register ton schooner was sunk by gunfire in the Gulf of Siam by the submarine USS Bugara (United States Navy).
William J. Palmer	United States	World War II: The Liberty ship struck a mine and sank in the Adriatic Sea off Trieste, Friuli-Venezia Giulia, Italy. The wreck was raised in 1949 and scrapped.

== 5 August ==
List of shipwrecks: 5 August 1945
Ship	State	Description
Hino Maru No. 25 GO	Imperial Japanese Navy	The auxiliary submarine chaser ran aground and sank in Bungo Suido off Himosaki Light.
Kori Maru	Japan	World War II: The cargo ship was torpedoed and sunk in the Yellow Sea by USS Billfish (United States Navy).
Kotohirasan Maru	Japan	World War II: The cargo ship was torpedoed and sunk in the Inland Sea of Japan by USS Pogy (United States Navy).
Unidentified junk	Unidentified	World War II: The 75-gross register ton junk was sunk by gunfire in the Gulf of Siam by the submarine USS Bugara (United States Navy).
Unidentified junk	Unidentified	World War II: Pursued by the submarine USS Bugara (United States Navy), the 20-gross register ton junk beached herself at Lem Chong Pra in the Gulf of Siam, and her crew fled. Bugara then hit her amidships with a single 5-inch (127 mm) shell and left her to sink.
Unidentified schooner	Unidentified	World War II: Heavily loaded with coffee, sugar, sewing machines, and other gear, the 200-gross register ton schooner was sunk by gunfire in the Gulf of Siam by the submarine USS Bugara (United States Navy).
Unidentified schooner	Unidentified	World War II: After her crew abandoned ship while she was at anchor behind the island of Koh Khai in the Gulf of Siam, the 64-gross register ton schooner was sunk by gunfire by the submarine USS Bugara (United States Navy).
Unknown	Unknown	World War II: The coaster was shelled and sunk in the Strait of Malacca near Malacca by HMS Seadog and HMS Shalimar (both Royal Navy).
Unknown junk	Unknown	World War II: The junk was captured and sunk with demolition charges in the Strait of Malacca near Malacca by HMS Seadog (Royal Navy).

== 6 August ==
List of shipwrecks: 6 August 1945
Ship	State	Description
USS Bullhead	United States Navy	World War II: The Balao-class submarine was sunk off Bali, Netherlands East Indies by depth charges dropped by an Imperial Japanese Army Air Service Mitsubishi Ki-51 (Allied reporting name "Sonia") bomber. All hands were lost. She was the last American warship lost during the war.
Lucien B. Maxwell	United States	The Liberty ship ran aground in the River Seine, France. She broke in two and sank, a total loss.
Unidentified cargo ship	Unidentified	World War II: The 16.6-gross register ton coastal cargo ship was sunk by gunfire in the Gulf of Siam by the submarine USS Bugara (United States Navy). Bugara estimated her actual capacity at 30 gross register tons.
Unidentified junk	Unidentified	World War II: During a voyage from Singapore to Bangkok, Thailand, the 125-gross register ton junk was sunk by gunfire in the Gulf of Siam by the submarine USS Bugara (United States Navy) after Bugara removed her crew.
Unidentified junk	Japan	World War II: The 26-gross register ton junk was sunk by gunfire in the Gulf of Siam by the submarine USS Bugara (United States Navy).
Unidentified junk	Unidentified	World War II: The 60-gross register ton junk was sunk by gunfire in the Gulf of Siam by the submarine USS Bugara (United States Navy) after her crew abandoned ship. Bugara captured and later released her crew.
Four unidentified junks	Unidentified	World War II: The four junks were sunk by gunfire in the Gulf of Siam by the submarine USS Bugara (United States Navy).
Unidentified schooner	Unidentified	World War II: Carrying a cargo of aviation gasoline, the 75-gross register ton schooner was set ablaze and sunk by gunfire in the Gulf of Siam by the submarine USS Bugara (United States Navy).
USS YF-777	United States Navy	The self-propelled covered lighter sank at Eniwetok.

== 7 August ==
List of shipwrecks: 7 August 1945
Ship	State	Description
Argos Hill	United Kingdom	The cargo ship (7,178 GRT, 1922) caught fire off St. John's, Dominion of Newfoundland (41°35′N 54°54′W). She was towed into Bay Bulls on 13 August; declared a constructive total loss.
CD-39	Imperial Japanese Navy	World War II: The Type C escort ship was bombed and sunk in the Sea of Japan off Kyosai Island, Korea (34°55′N 128°44′E) by North American B-25 Mitchell aircraft of the United States Fifth Air Force. Thirty-three crewmen were killed.
CHa-66	Imperial Japanese Navy	World War II: The CHa-1-class submarine chaser was sunk at Truk (07°23′N 151°53′E) by Boeing B-29 Superfortress aircraft of the United States Twentieth Air Force.
Kibitsu Maru	Imperial Japanese Army	World War II: The Kibitsu Maru-class landing craft depot ship was mined near Kobe (34°37′N 135°04′E) and beached to prevent sinking. Scrapped 1947.
Nanki Maru No. 9	Japan	World War II: The tanker was bombed and sunk in the Sea of Japan (34°55′N 128°44′E) off Kyosai Island, Korea by North American B-25 Mitchell aircraft of the United States Fifth Air Force.
Unidentified cargo ship	Imperial Japanese Navy	World War II: The 26.5-gross register ton coastal cargo ship was sunk by gunfire in the Gulf of Siam by the submarine USS Bugara (United States Navy).
Unidentified cargo ship	Unidentified	World War II: During a voyage to Singapore with a cargo of rice, the 28-gross register ton coastal cargo ship was sunk by gunfire in the Gulf of Siam by the submarine USS Bugara (United States Navy).

== 8 August ==
List of shipwrecks: 8 August 1945
Ship	State	Description
Argos Hill	United Kingdom	The cargo ship caught fire in the Atlantic Ocean 385 nautical miles (713 km) off Halifax, Nova Scotia, Canada. Her 40 crew were rescued by the Liberty ship Noah Brown and the Victory ship Montclair Victory (both United States).
Geiyo Maru	Imperial Japanese Navy	The auxiliary submarine chaser was sunk.
Nanjin Maru	Japan	World War II: The cargo ship was torpedoed and sunk in the Inland Sea of Japan by USS Pargo (United States Navy).
Rashin Maru	Japan	World War II: The cargo liner was torpedoed and sunk in the Sea of Japan by USS Pargo (United States Navy). Eight hundred troops and 35 crewmen were killed.
SS-22	Imperial Japanese Navy	World War II: The SS-class landing ship was sunk by US carrier aircraft near Aomori, Aomori.

== 9 August ==
List of shipwrecks: 9 August 1945
Ship	State	Description
Amakusa	Imperial Japanese Navy	World War II: The Etorofu-class escort ship was bombed and sunk in shallow water in Onagawa Bay (38°26′N 141°30′E) by Vought F4U Corsair aircraft from HMS Formidable (Royal Navy). Seventy-one crewmen were killed. She was scrapped in 1948.
CH-42	Imperial Japanese Navy	World War II: The CH-28-class submarine chaser was bombed and beached in Onagawa Bay (38°24′N 141°15′E) by F4U Corsair aircraft from HMS Formidable (Royal Navy).
Daito Maru	Japan	World War II: The Type 2A Standard cargo ship, a converted Standard Type 2AT tanker, was torpedoed by Soviet Ilyushin DB-3 aircraft 24 kilometres (15 miles) south southeast of Chongjin, Korea and was beached. She sank later in the day.
Ikara	Imperial Japanese Navy	World War II: The Ukuru-class escort ship was damaged by a mine in Nanau Bay on 1 August. A crewman was killed. On 9 August she struck a mine in the Koguchi Channel and was beached. Refloated and sunk as a breakwater somewhere in Japan sometime in spring 1946.
Ikutsu Maru	Japan	World War II: The cargo ship was sunk by Soviet aircraft.
Inagi	Imperial Japanese Navy	World War II: The Ukuru-class escort ship was bombed and sunk in shallow water in Onagawa Bay (38°26′N 141°30′E) by Vought F4U Corsair aircraft from HMS Formidable (Royal Navy). Twenty-nine crewmen were killed, 35 were wounded. She was scrapped in 1947.
Juko Maru	Imperial Japanese Navy	World War II: The oiler was bombed and sunk in shallow water in Onagawa Bay off Hamada (39°30′N 142°04′E) by United States Navy aircraft.
Kasato Maru	Japan	World War II: The cargo ship was bombed and sunk at Utka by Soviet bomber aircraft.
Melbourne Maru	Imperial Japanese Army	World War II: Convoy No. 726: The Sydney Maru-class auxiliary transport (5,651 GRT) was bombed and sunk at Rajin, Chosen by Soviet bomber aircraft. 25 crew were killed, 35 survived.
Ohama	Imperial Japanese Navy	World War II: The escort ship was bombed and sunk in shallow water in Onagawa Bay (38°26′N 141°30′E) by Vought F4U Corsair aircraft from HMS Formidable (Royal Navy). Twenty-nine crewmen were killed, 35 were wounded.
T-21	Imperial Japanese Navy	World War II: The transport ship was bombed and damaged off the Kutsuna Islands in the Inland Sea by Republic P-47 Thunderbolt aircraft of the United States Far East Air Force's 20th Air Force's 318th Fighter Group. She was purposely beached at Tsuwaji-jima. There were 60 killed and around 100 wounded. On 10 August the ship capsized and sank in shallow water (39°09′N 132°31′E). The wreck was raised and scrapped in 1948.
Tahei Maru No. 6 GO	Imperial Japanese Navy	The auxiliary submarine chaser was lost on this date.
Tokiwa	Imperial Japanese Navy	The wreck of Tokiwa World War II: The minelayer, a former Asama-class armored cruiser, was severely damaged in Mutsu Bay at Ōminato, Japan, in a raid by aircraft of Task Force 38 (United States Navy) and was beached by her crew to prevent her from sinking. 109 sailors were killed and 82 wounded. She was refloated on 5 April 1947 and scrapped.
Tuma Maru No. 6 GO	Imperial Japanese Navy	The auxiliary submarine chaser was lost on this date.
Unknown schooner	Japan	World War II: The fishing schooner was captured by Soviet motor torpedo boats and sunk or abandoned to sink.
Unknown steamers	Manchukuo	World War II: Two unidentified steamers were sunk by Soviet Border Guard gunboats in the Amur River near Huma.
W-1	Imperial Japanese Navy	World War II: The No.1-class minesweeper was bombed and sunk in Yamada Bay (38°26′N 141°30′E) by United States Navy aircraft.
W-33	Imperial Japanese Navy	World War II: The No.19-class minesweeper was bombed and sunk in shallow water in Onagawa Bay (38°26′N 141°30′E) by Vought F4U Corsair aircraft from HMS Formidable (Royal Navy).
Zao Maru No. 8 GO	Imperial Japanese Navy	The auxiliary submarine chaser was lost on this date.

== 10 August ==
List of shipwrecks: 10 August 1945
Ship	State	Description
Awagawa Maru	Japan	World War II: The Standard Type 2A cargo ship (a.k.a. Awakawa Maru) was torpedoed and sunk in the Sea of Japan (41°26′N 129°49′E) off Seisin, Korea by Soviet Ilyushin DB-3 aircraft.
CD-63	Imperial Japanese Navy	World War II: The Type C escort ship struck a mine that blew her bow off in Nanao Bay. She was beached to prevent sinking.
CD-75	Imperial Japanese Navy	World War II: The Type C escort ship ran aground and was scuttled by her crew off Nō, Niigata. She may have hit a mine.
CD-82	Imperial Japanese Navy	World War II: The Type D escort ship was torpedoed in the Sea of Japan 7 nautical miles (13 km) south south west of Kunsudan, Korea (41°21′N 131°12′E) by a Soviet Ilyushin Il-4 torpedo bomber. The torpedo detonated her depth charges, sinking the ship. One hundred and seventeen crewmen were killed. Ninety-three survivors were rescued by Hyuga Maru (Japan).
Horai Maru No. 14	Japan	World War II: The tanker was damaged by Soviet aircraft and beached in Panova Bay. Possibly recovered by Metel (Soviet Navy) on 20 August.
Ikutso Maru	Japan	World War II: The cargo ship was strafed, set on fire, burned out and sunk by Soviet motor torpedo boats at Rajin, Korea.
Issin Maru	Japan	World War II: The cargo ship was torpedoed and sunk by Soviet Ilyushin DB-3 aircraft.
Kari Go	Japan	World War II: The cargo ship was torpedoed and sunk by TK-534, TK-562, and TK-573 (all Soviet Navy) at Rajin, Korea.
Kongo Maru No. 2 GO	Imperial Japanese Navy	World War II: The auxiliary minesweeper was sunk off Onogawa, Japan (38°30′N 141°29′E) by aircraft from Task Force 38.
Ohama	Imperial Japanese Navy	World War II: The Ohama-class escort was sunk by US and Royal Navy carrier aircraft in the Onagawa area.
Shintohoku Maru	Imperial Japanese Navy	The auxiliary minesweeper was lost on this date.
Shuan An	Manchukuo Imperial Navy	World War II: The Shuan An-class patrol craft was sunk by BK-28, BK-29, and two other patrol boats (all Soviet Navy) in Lake Khanka after being partially scuttled by her crew.
Shuan Kai	Manchukuo Imperial Navy	World War II: The Shuan An-class patrol craft was sunk by BK-28, BK-29, and two other patrol boats (all Soviet Navy) in Lake Khanka after being run aground.
Shun Tsu	Manchukuo Imperial Navy	World War II: The Shun Tsu-class patrol craft was sunk by BK-28, BK-29, and two other patrol boats (all Soviet Navy) in Lake Khanka after being partially scuttled by her crew.
Taishun Maru	Japan	World War II: The cargo ship was torpedoed and damaged by Soviet motor torpedo boats at Seisin, Korea. Sank later under tow.
Takunan Maru No. 6 GO	Imperial Japanese Navy	World War II: The auxiliary submarine chaser was sunk by United States carrier aircraft off Onagawa.
Unknown	Manchukuo	World War II: Eleven unidentified fishing vessels were sunk by BK-28, BK-29, and two other patrol boats (all Soviet Navy) in Lake Khanka.
Unknown	Manchukuo	World War II: Two police boats and four scows were sunk by BK-45, BK-46, BK-55, BK-56, BK-71, BK-73, BK-74, BK-75, and other units (all Soviet Navy) in the Amur River at Sakhalyansky.
Wei Ming	Manchukuo Imperial Navy	The Wei Ming-class patrol boat was lost on this date.
Yang Chun	Manchukuo Imperial Navy	The Hsin Chun-class armored river motor gunboat was lost on this date.

== 11 August ==
List of shipwrecks: 11 August 1945
Ship	State	Description
Edamitsu Maru	Japan	World War II: The cargo ship torpedoed and was sunk by TK-550 and TK-563 (both Soviet Navy) at Rajin, Korea.
Enpo Maru	Japan	World War II: The cargo ship was torpedoed and sunk by TK-550 and TK-563 (both Soviet Navy) at Rajin, Korea.
Teihoku Maru	Japan	World War II: The cargo ship was torpedoed and sunk in the Sea of Japan (38°06′N 130°20′E) east of Sokcho, Korea, north of Utsuryo Island, in 859 metres (2,818 ft) of water by USS Jallao (United States Navy). Her captain and 26 crew were killed.
Tensho Maru	Japan	World War II: The cargo ship was torpedoed and sunk by TK-549 and four other motor torpedo boats (all Soviet Navy) at Rajin, Korea.

== 12 August ==
List of shipwrecks: 12 August 1945
Ship	State	Description
Hozugawa Maru	Japan	World War II: The cargo ship was wrecked at Seisin, Korea while trying to evade Soviet motor torpedo boats. The wreck was torpedoed by TK-589 (Soviet Navy) on 13 August.
Pa-166	Imperial Japanese Navy	World War II: The Pa-1-class patrol ship was sunk at Urasaki by American aircraft.
Palange	Netherlands East Indies	World War II: The schooner was scuttled in the Java Sea by HMS Thorough (Royal Navy).
Wairuna	United Kingdom	The storeship was severely damaged by fire at Greenock, Renfrewshire.
Yu 1001	Imperial Japanese Army	World War II: The Yu 1001-class Type 3 submergence transport vehicle was sunk by U.S. aircraft at Shimoda, Japan.

== 13 August ==
List of shipwrecks: 13 August 1945
Ship	State	Description
Bandai Maru No. 3 GO	Imperial Japanese Navy	The auxiliary submarine chaser was sunk on this date.
CD-6	Imperial Japanese Navy	World War II: The Type D escort ship was torpedoed and sunk in the Pacific Ocean off Hokkaido between Cape Erimo and Muroran (42°16′N 142°12′E) by USS Atule (United States Navy). Lost with all 196 hands.
Kaiho Maru	Japan	World War II: The cargo ship was torpedoed and sunk in the Inland Sea of Japan by USS Torsk (United States Navy).
Ruth	United States	The 6-gross register ton, 29.2-foot (8.9 m) fishing vessel was wrecked in Wrangell Narrows in the Alexander Archipelago in Southeast Alaska.
Tahei Maru No. 7 GO	Imperial Japanese Navy	The auxiliary submarine chaser was lost on this date.
Tsushima Maru	Japan	World War II: The cargo ship was scuttled to prevent capture.

== 14 August ==
List of shipwrecks: 14 August 1945
Ship	State	Description
CD-13	Imperial Japanese Navy	World War II: The Type C escort ship was torpedoed and sunk in the Sea of Japan off Kamicho Bight near Maizuru (35°41′N 134°35′E) by USS Torsk (United States Navy). Twenty-eight crewmen were killed.
CD-47	Imperial Japanese Navy	World War II: The Type C escort ship was torpedoed and sunk in the Sea of Japan off Kamicho Bight near Maizuru (35°42′N 134°36′E) by USS Torsk (United States Navy).
Hirota Maru	Imperial Japanese Navy	World War II: The Hirota Maru-class transport (2,922 GRT 1940) was sunk about three nautical miles (5.6 km; 3.5 mi) north northeast of Mutsure Island, Japan (34°00′N 130°52′E) by an aerial mine laid by a USAAF 20th Air Force Boeing B-29 Superfortress aircraft with the loss of seven crewmen and one gunner.
I-373	Imperial Japanese Navy	World War II: The Type D2 submarine was torpedoed and sunk in the East China Sea 190 nautical miles (350 km; 220 mi) south east of Shanghai, China (29°02′N 123°53′E) by USS Spikefish (United States Navy). Eighty-four crewmen were killed. A survivor was rescued by USS Spikefish.

== 15 August ==
List of shipwrecks: 15 August 1945
Ship	State	Description
Bernlef	Allied-occupied Germany	The cargo ship, laden with bombs and mines, exploded and sank in the North Sea (56°10′01″N 17°07′01″E), killing all on board.
CHa-167	Imperial Japanese Navy	The CHa-1-class submarine chaser was sunk by accident at Kure.
Kanju	Imperial Japanese Navy	World War II: The Etorofu-class escort ship struck a mine off Wonsan, Korea and was scuttled (39°10′N 127°27′E). Three crewmen were killed and 50 were wounded. Survivors were rescued by Hodaka (Imperial Japanese Navy).

== 16 August ==
List of shipwrecks: 16 August 1945
Ship	State	Description
23 Shin'yō suicide motorboats	Imperial Japanese Navy	The Shin'yō suicide motorboats were destroyed when one caught fire setting off warheads of the boats in a chain reaction. 111 base workers, 23 crewmen, and 3 squadron officers are killed.
Unidentified schooner	Imperial Japanese Navy	World War II: The motor schooner was shelled and sunk by Metel (Soviet Navy) near Seisin, Korea.

== 17 August ==
List of shipwrecks: 17 August 1945
Ship	State	Description
CD-46	Imperial Japanese Navy	World War II: The Type D escort ship struck a mine and sank in the Yellow Sea off Mokpo, Korea (34°51′N 126°02′E).
Gustaf Lagerbjelke	Sweden	The cargo ship ran aground off Strängnäs. She sank on 19 August.
Hikawa Maru No. 2	Imperial Japanese Navy	( Red Cross): World War II: The illegally captured Netherlands hospital ship was scuttled in Wakasa Bay.
HMS LCA 1591	Royal Navy	The landing craft assault (8.5/11.5 t, 1944) was lost on this date.
HMML 230	Royal Navy	The Fairmile B motor launch (76/86 t, 1941) sank in the Netherlands East Indies in a collision.
Stanforth	United Kingdom	The cargo ship (1,817 GRT, 1915) ran aground on the Grundkallegrund. She broke in two and was a total loss.

== 18 August ==
List of shipwrecks: 18 August 1945
Ship	State	Description
CD-213	Imperial Japanese Navy	World War II: The Type C escort ship struck a mine, or was torpedoed and sunk by Soviet aircraft, in the South China Sea off Pusan, Korea (35°10′N 129°00′E).
DS-1	Soviet Navy	World War II: Battle of Shumshu: The LCI(L)-1-class landing ship was destroyed by Japanese artillery during the Soviet landings on Shumshu, Kuril Islands.
DS-5	Soviet Navy	World War II: Battle of Shumshu: The LCI(L)-1-class landing ship was destroyed by Japanese artillery during the Soviet landings on Shumshu.
DS-9	Soviet Navy	World War II: Battle of Shumshu: The LCI(L)-1-class landing ship was destroyed by Japanese artillery during the Soviet landings on Shumshu.
DS-43	Soviet Navy	World War II: Battle of Shumshu: The LCI(L)-1-class landing ship was destroyed by Japanese artillery during the Soviet landings on Shumshu.
DS-47	Soviet Navy	World War II: Battle of Shumshu: The LCI(L)-1-class landing ship was destroyed by Japanese artillery during the Soviet landings on Shumshu.
Ha-209	Imperial Japanese Navy	World War II: The Type STS submarine was deliberately run aground by her crew off Ganryū-jima in the Shimonoseki Strait. The wreck was blown up by a United States Navy demolition team in November 1945, then refloated in November 1947 and scrapped.
Hakusan Maru	Imperial Japanese Army	World War II: The Hakusan Maru-class prisoner of war relief supply ship (4,351 GRT 1941) struck a mine and sank off Hagi, Yamaguchi prefecture, Japan. The vessel was raised, repaired and returned to service in 1946.
T-152	Soviet Navy	World War II: Battle of Shumshu: The minesweeper was lost in the Kuril Islands.
TK-565	Soviet Navy	The A-1 (Vosper 72-foot)-class motor torpedo boat was lost on this date.
Unknown vessels	Manchukuo Imperial Navy	World War II: An unidentified armed ship was sunk by Soviet gunboats in the Sungari River at Sanxin, along with three barges.

== 19 August ==
List of shipwrecks: 19 August 1945
Ship	State	Description
PK-35	Soviet Navy	World War II: The MO-4-class patrol ship ran aground off Moaka and was shelled and damaged by Zarnitsa (Soviet Navy). She was towed off by BO-302 (Soviet Navy).
Unidentified schooner	Japan	World War II: The schooner was shelled and sunk by PK-31 (Soviet Navy) (operated by the NKVD) off Moaka.

== 20 August ==
List of shipwrecks: 20 August 1945
Ship	State	Description
Kamui Maru No. 9 GO	Imperial Japanese Navy	The auxiliary submarine chaser was lost on this date.
Partizan	Soviet Navy	World War II: The guard ship was mined and sunk off Gensan, Korea.

== 21 August ==
List of shipwrecks: 21 August 1945
Ship	State	Description
Chasseur 116	French Navy	World War II: The submarine chaser was sunk by a mine off Marseille, Bouches-du-Rhône. Five crew were killed and about ten wounded.
Keizan Maru No. 6 GO	Imperial Japanese Navy	The auxiliary submarine chaser was lost on this date.
Unknown motorboat	Japan	World War II: The motorboat was shelled and sunk by ShCh-126 (Soviet Navy).

== 22 August ==
List of shipwrecks: 22 August 1945
Ship	State	Description
Asagao	Imperial Japanese Navy	World War II: The Wakatake-class destroyer was heavily damaged by a mine in the Kanmon Strait off the Mutsure Lighthouse, she was beached and abandoned. Scrapped 1947–1948.
Daito Maru No. 49	Japan	World War II: The cargo ship was torpedoed and sunk in the Pacific Ocean off Abashiri, Hokkaido, by L-13 (Soviet Navy).
Notoro Maru	Japan	World War II: The cargo ship was torpedoed and sunk by Soviet Ilyushin DB-3 aircraft.
Ogasawara Maru	Japan	World War II: The cable layer was shelled and sunk in the Pacific Ocean off Rumon, Hokkaido by L-12 (Soviet Navy). 641 killed.
Pa-163	Imperial Japanese Navy	World War II: The Pa-1-class patrol ship was sunk by a mine in Nano Bay.
Taito Maru	Japan	World War II: The coaster was torpedoed and sunk in the Pacific Ocean off Rumon by L-19 (Soviet Navy). 553 or 667 killed.
Tetsugo Maru	Japan	World War II: The cargo ship was torpedoed and sunk in the Pacific Ocean by L-19 (Soviet Navy).

== 23 August ==
List of shipwrecks: 23 August 1945
Ship	State	Description
Alice H. Rice	United States	The Liberty ship was driven ashore in Subic Bay.
CD-75	Imperial Japanese Navy	World War II: The Type C escort ship struck a mine and sank in the Pacific Ocean off Hokkaido.
CHa-49	Imperial Japanese Navy	World War II: The submarine chaser struck a mine and sank at Niigata.
Tetsugo Maru	Japan	World War II: The cargo ship was torpedoed and sunk off Rumoi, Hokkaido (44°08′N 141°30′E) by L-19 (Soviet Navy).

== 24 August ==
List of shipwrecks: 24 August 1945
Ship	State	Description
Giso Maru No. 40 GO	Imperial Japanese Navy	The auxiliary submarine chaser was sunk on this date.
USCGC Magnolia	United States Coast Guard	The lighthouse tender sank in collision with Marguerite Le Hand (United States) 1 nautical mile (1.9 km) south south west of the Mobile Point Light Tower off the mouth of Mobile Bay, Alabama (30°12′N 88°02′W) with her funnel above water. A crewman was killed.
PB 104	Imperial Japanese Navy	World War II: The patrol boat was sunk in the Shimonoseki Strait off Nishiyama by a mine.
Saint George II	United States	The 26-gross register ton, 40.5-foot (12.3 m) fishing vessel was lost at the Kasilof River off Cook Inlet on the Kenai Peninsula in the Territory of Alaska.
Ukishima Maru	Imperial Japanese Navy	World War II: The Ukishima Maru-class auxiliary transport ship struck a magnetic mine in Maizuru Bay, off Jajima Island, breaking in two and was sunk. 524 of the 3,725 Koreans aboard (forced laborers and their families being repatriated) and 25 of the 255 Japanese crew were killed. The ship's stern was refloated on 7 January 1954 and later scrapped.

== 25 August ==
List of shipwrecks: 25 August 1945
Ship	State	Description
Ha-206	Imperial Japanese Navy	The abandoned, incomplete Type STS submarine sank at Kawasaki Shipbuilding Corporationʼs Sesnhu Yard at Tanagawa, Osaka Prefecture, Japan, during a typhoon. Her wreck was refloated in April 1946.

== 26 August ==
List of shipwrecks: 26 August 1945
Ship	State	Description
Christiaan Huygens	Netherlands	The passenger ship struck a mine in the Scheldt and was beached. She broke in two on 5 September and was declared a total loss.
HMMTB 261	Royal Navy	The Elco 70' PT boat sank at Alexandria, Egypt.

== 28 August ==
List of shipwrecks: 28 August 1945
Ship	State	Description
CHa-77	Imperial Japanese Navy	World War II: The CHa-1-class submarine chaser was sunk off Paramushiro (by American aircraft?).

== 30 August ==
List of shipwrecks: 30 August 1945
Ship	State	Description
Two Shin'yō suicide motorboats	Imperial Japanese Navy	World War II: The two disarmed Maru-Ni suicide boats were attacked by British carrier aircraft from HMS Indomitable and HMS Venerable (both Royal Navy) in the shipping channel in Lamma Bay, Hong Kong. One was sunk, one beached. The British thought they might be attacking.

== 31 August ==
List of shipwrecks: 31 August 1945
Ship	State	Description
Charles C. Randleman	United States	The Liberty ship ran aground on the Apo Reef, Philippines and was wrecked.
Fukugawa Maru No. 7 GO	Imperial Japanese Navy	The auxiliary submarine chaser was lost on this date.

== Unknown date ==
List of shipwrecks: Unknown date 1945
Ship	State	Description
Basil	United Kingdom	The cargo ship (4,913 GRT, 1928) ran aground in the Amazon. Refloated, arrived at Pará, Brazil on 19 August.
CHa-204	Imperial Japanese Navy	The CHa-1-class submarine chaser was wrecked sometime in August in unknown location.
Hokkai Maru	Japan	World War II: The cargo ship was bombed and sunk off Surabaya, Netherlands East Indies/Indonesia by Allied aircraft.
L-19	Soviet Navy	World War II: The Leninets-class submarine was sunk by a mine on or after 24 August, probably in or near the La Pérouse Strait with all 64 hands.
Pa-54, Pa-165 and Pa-180	Imperial Japanese Navy	The Pa-1-class patrol ships sank from leaks at Yokosuka sometime in August.
Pa-90	Imperial Japanese Navy	The Pa-1-class patrol ship was sunk off Sataka sometime in August or September.
Peter White	United States	World War II: The Liberty ship struck a mine and was damaged in the Philippine Sea off Leyte, Philippines (14°25′N 123°45′E). She was declared a constructive total loss.
Spirala	Japan	World War II: The cargo ship was scuttled at Singapore. She was refloated in April 1953 and scrapped.
SS-13	Imperial Japanese Navy	The SS-class landing ship was wrecked in August.
