= Peekay =

Peekay may refer to:

- Peekay (The Power of One), main character of the novel The Power of One
- Peekay (film), or PK, 2014 Indian film

== See also ==
- PK (disambiguation)
- Pique (disambiguation)
