= PK-35 =

PK-35 or PK 35 may refer to:

- PK-35 (men), a Finnish football club based in Helsinki
- PK-35 (women), a Finnish football club based in Helsinki
- PK-35 Vantaa (women), a Finnish football club based in Vantaa
- PK-35 Vantaa (men), a former Finnish football team based in Vantaa
- Constituency PK-35 (Swabi-V), Khyber Pakhtunkhwa Assembly, Pakistan
- Soviet patrol ship PK-35, an MO-4-class patrol ship wrecked in August 1945
- PK 35, the Wentzelplatz station of the Hamburg Police
- PK 35, the Mountboy point on the Briare Canal
- PK 35, the Lys River point on the Canal de la Deûle
- PK 35, the Pargny-Filain point on the Canal de l'Oise à l'Aisne
