= PK =

PK or pk may refer to:

== Arts and entertainment ==
=== Gaming ===
- Probability of kill (P_{k}), in computer games, simulations, models, and operations research
- Disney's PK: Out of the Shadows, a 2002 video game
- Player killing, player versus player conflict in MMORPGs and MUDs

=== Other media ===
- PK (film), a 2014 Indian film directed by Rajkumar Hirani and starring Aamir Khan
  - PK (soundtrack), its soundtrack by Shantanu Moitra, Ajay–Atul and Ankit Tiwari
- Paperinik, a cartoon character
- Peacekeepers (Farscape), in the Farscape television show

== Organisations ==
- Pakistan International Airlines (IATA airline code)
- Polyteknikkojen Kuoro, a Finnish academic male choir
- Promise Keepers, a Christian men's organization
- Swedish Publicists' Association (Swedish: Publicistklubben), Swedish journalist organization

== People ==
- Prashant Kishor (born 1977), Indian political strategist turned politician
- P.K (producer), of the South Korean music production duo Future Bounce
- P. K. van der Byl (1923–1999), Rhodesian politician
- P. K. Subban (born 1989), hockey player
- Paul Kalkbrenner (born 1977), electronic musician
- Pawan Kalyan (born 1971), Indian film actor and politician
- Phil Katz (1962–2000), creator of the PKZIP file compression software
- Philip K. Wrigley (1894–1977), American chewing gum manufacturer
- Paul Kagame (born 1957), President of Rwanda
- Patricia Karvelas, Australian radio presenter, current affairs journalist and political correspondent

== Places ==
- PK, or Busan–Gyeongnam Area, a metropolitan area in South Korea
- Pakistan (ISO country code)
- Possum Kingdom Lake, Texas, US
- Pickering, Ontario, Canada
- Peking, old name of Beijing

== Science and technology ==
=== Chemistry and pharmacology ===
- pK, negative logarithm of the dissociation constant K (-logK)
- Pharmacokinetics, a branch of pharmacology dedicated to determining the fate of substances administered to a living organism

=== Computing ===
- Primary key, a unique attribute within the relational model of databases
- PK, a magic number commonly used in the Zip file format
- .pk, the country code top level domain (ccTLD) for Pakistan
- Port knocking, a method of externally opening ports on a firewall
- Public-key cryptography

=== Other uses in science and technology ===
- PK machine gun, a Soviet weapon, abbreviated from Pulemyot Kalashnikova (Kalashnikov machine gun)
- Horsepower (Dutch abbreviation paardenkracht)
- Pentax K-mount, a camera lens mount
- Catalogue of galactic planetary nebulae (Perek-Kohoutek), in astronomy
- Renault PK, a car made by Pars Khodro between 2000 and 2005
- PK screws, self-tapping screws (Parker-Kalon) for sheet metal

== Sports ==
- Parkour, the activity or sport of moving rapidly through an area, typically urban, negotiating obstacles by running, jumping, and climbing
- Penalty kick (association football)
- Penalty kill, in ice hockey
- Placekicker, in American football

== Other uses ==
- Point kilométrique (English: Kilometric point), a measurement of distance travelled
- Preacher's kid, a child of a pastor
- SAS President Kruger (F150), a former ship of the South African Navy
- Psychokinesis, an alleged psychic ability allowing a person to influence objects without physical interaction
- Pre-kindergarten
- Indonesia (aircraft registration prefix PK)
- PK, in List of chewing gum brands

== See also ==
- Piquet, a trick-taking card game for two players
