= Gulzar In Conversation With Tagore =

Gulzar in conversation with Tagore

Studio album by Gulzar, Shantanu Moitra, Shaan, Shreya Ghoshal
- Released: 18 October 2016
- Venue: Mumbai
- Length: 46:20
- Language: Hindi, Bengali
- Label: Saregama

Music Videos
- "Gulzar In Conversation with Tagore Audio Jukebox" on YouTube
- "Singaar Ko Rahne Do" on YouTube
- "Main Ghoomta Hoon" on YouTube
- "Bhuj Gaya Tha Kyu Diya" on YouTube

Gulzar in conversation with Tagore is a 2016 album of Rabindranath Tagore's 6 poems and 1 song translated into Hindi by Gulzar with music by Shantanu Moitra and sung by Shaan and Shreya Ghoshal.

== Track listing ==
All lyrics are written by Rabindranath Tagore; all music is composed by Shantanu Moitra.

Gulzar In Conversation With Tagore
No.	Title	Artist(s)	Length
1.	"Singaar Ko Rehne Do"	Shreya Ghoshal, Gulzar	06:56
2.	"Main Wahi Hoon"	Shreya Ghoshal, Gulzar	06:54
3.	"Main Ghoomta Hun"	Shaan, Gulzar	06:48
4.	"O Sakhi Sun"	Shreya Ghoshal, Gulzar	06:44
5.	"Bhuj Gaya Tha Kyun Diya"	Shreya Ghoshal, Shaan, Gulzar	06:15
6.	"Maine To Kuch"	Shreya Ghoshal, Gulzar	06:36
7.	"Dono Behne"	Shaan, Gulzar	06:00
Total length:			46:20
