= Chaar Kadam =

- Picture sleeve with actors Sushant Singh Rajput and Anushka Sharma

Song by Shaan and Shreya Ghoshal

from the album PK
- Language: Hindi
- English title: "Four Steps"
- Released: 5 November 2014
- Genre: Filmi, classic pop
- Length: 4:20
- Label: T-Series
- Composer: Shantanu Moitra
- Lyricist: Swanand Kirkire
- Producer: Rajkumar Hirani

Music video
- "Chaar Kadam" on YouTube

"Chaar Kadam" (transl. Four steps) is a Hindi song from the 2014 Hindi film, PK. Composed by Shantanu Moitra, the song is sung by Shaan and Shreya Ghoshal, with lyrics penned by Swanand Kirkire. The music video of the track features actors Sushant Singh Rajput and Anushka Sharma. The music is inspired from Ian Hughes - Valse Parisienne. The music is also inspired by Tchaikovsky - Waltz from Sleeping Beauty Op. 66.

== Background ==
On 23 May 2013, Shaan confirmed through Twitter that he recorded the song for the film PK along with Shreya Ghoshal. The song was composed by Shantanu Moitra, while the lyrics was penned by Swanand Kirkire. The song is based on one of Kirkire's poems. In an interview, Moitra stated: "It is actually the love song from the album and it is shot exactly the way romantic numbers were shot once upon a time in Bollywood. The visuals will remind you of Silsila, that iconic moment where the camera gently captures the love brewing between Amitabh Bachchan and Rekha. There were no fast camera movement or loud shots. This is one of my favorite tracks from the album".

Rajkumar Hirani wanted to shoot this track in a new and unique place. He basically looked for three locations, canal, town hall and cobbled streets of Europe. Hence, the crew travelled 3,500 kilometres to search for it before finalising Bruges in Belgium. Prior to that, the crew looked for other major European cities like Paris, Venice and Prague. Shooting of the song was completed within two to three days.

The whole song was shot in the Belgian city of Bruges. It was the first Hindi song to be shot in this city. Talking about the location of the song, Hirani stated, "I was spellbound by the picturesque architecture, landscapes, the strong historical background and clean refreshing environs. I decided that this is just the right place to shoot a part of the movie as it fitted in beautifully with the storyline". The song captures some of the landmark places like the Market Square, Howest Campus, Sint-Jorisstraat, the Beguinage and several streets and canals. The song is choreographed by Stanley D'Costa.

== Release and success ==
The music video of the song was released on 2 November 2014. The video of the music is the fourth song released from the film, after "Tharki Chokro", "Love is Waste of Time" and "Nanga Punga Dost". The audio of the song was officially released on 5 November 2014, through the YouTube channel of T-Series. It was available on music-streaming platforms and for digital download on the same day along with the other tracks from the album.

The song received praise and positive feedback on the pairing of the two actors, Sushant Singh Rajput and Anushka Sharma. In an interview, Sharma picked the song as her favourite track from the album.

== Critical reception ==
The song received mixed response from critics. Though reviewers praised the singing of Shaan and Shreya Ghoshal, many of them criticised the composition for having a heard-before feel to it. The song seems to draw inspiration from the romantic song "Waltz for a night" by Julie Delpy from the movie Before Sunset.

Surabhi Redkar from Koimoi felt the song "has its own charm and is expected to become popular and high on likeability quotient" and he stated it "is quite sweet to the ears, though there is a clichéd and repetitive tune to it". Devesh Sharma reviewing from Filmfare stated "Shaan brings all the romance in his voice to belt out a breezy love duet in the able company of Shreya".

Joginder Tuteja from Rediff.com found the song boring and commented "The start sounds dated. It also has a nursery rhyme feel to it, but it's not memorable even after listening to it several times".

== Accolades ==
Year	Award	Category	Nominee	Result	Ref
2015	Guild Awards	Best Female Playback Singer	Shreya Ghoshal	Nominated	
2015	Guild Awards	Best Male Playback Singer	Shaan	Nominated	
2015	Global Indian Music Academy Awards	Best Lyricist	Swanand Kirkire	Nominated	
