= Nanga Punga Dost =

- Cover of the song featuring actors Aamir Khan

Song by Shreya Ghoshal

from the album PK
- Released: 1 November 2014
- Genre: Filmi
- Length: 4:46
- Label: T-Series
- Composer: Shantanu Moitra
- Lyricist: Swanand Kirkire

PK track listing
- 1. "Tharki Chokro"; 2. "Nanga Punga Dost"; 3. "Chaar Kadam"; 4. "Love Is a Waste of Time"; 5. "Bhagwan Hai Kahan Re Tu"; 6. "PK Dance Theme"; 7. "Dil Darbadar"

Music video
- "Nanga Punga Dost" on YouTube

"Nanga Punga Dost" (transl. Naked friend) is a Hindi song from the 2014 Hindi film PK. Composed by Shantanu Moitra, the song is sung by Shreya Ghoshal, with lyrics penned by Swanand Kirkire. The music video features actors Aamir Khan and Anushka Sharma.

== Background ==
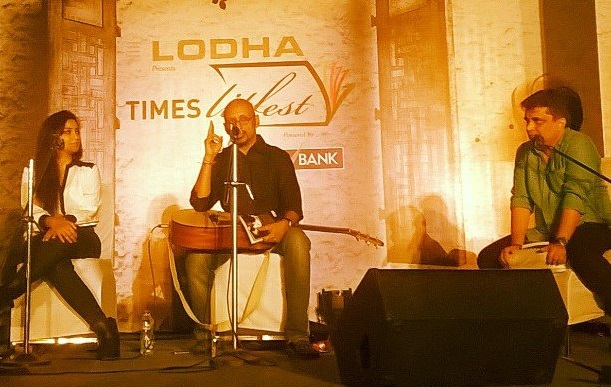
Shreya Ghoshal (left) reading and singing Shantanu Moitra's memoirs at Times Litfest event along with Swanand Kirkire (right) on 6 December 2014. The song is composed by Moitra, sung by Ghoshal and written by Kirkire.

The idea of the song was presented by the film's director, Rajkumar Hirani, to composer Shantanu Moitra. The song was conceptualised well before the release of the film's first poster, which famously features Aamir posing nude with a strategically placed vintage boombox. On 14 November 2014, reports suggested that a song would be released, based on Aamir Khan's naked sequence in the film. Moitra confirmed the news: "Nanga Punga is an amazing, crazy and wild song, crooned by Shreya Ghoshal. It is based on Aamir's nude sequence in the film."

Regarding the vocals by Ghoshal in the song, Moitra stated: "Shreya has sung this quirky number beautifully and it shows her prowess as a singer". The crew of the song, Hirani, Moitra, Ghoshal, Kirikire along with Khan, had previously worked in the song "Zoobi Doobi" from 3 Idiots (2009). The first verse of the song with a different lyrics, was used in the film, in the introductory scene of Anushka Sharma, while the original version of the song was used in the end credits.

Music and Composition

The song starts with a guitar riff and incorporates violin in the middle. It blends orchestral elements with Indian flavors. The lyrics of the song were penned by Swanand Kirkire. In an interview, Khan stated that the song does not "come in the bracket of item songs and when I talk about the lyrics by themselves would project bad things. When you listen to the songs while watching the film you will get the real meaning of them".

== Release ==
The music video of the song was officially released on 1 November 2014, through the YouTube channel of T-Series. The music video of the song, was the third song released from the album, after the two singles, "Tharki Chokro" and "Love is Waste of Time". The song was released on 5 November 2014, along with other tracks in the album.

=== Chart performance ===
On 14 November 2014, the song debuted at position 81 in iTunes India Chart Top 100. It was ranked at position 20 on 20 December 2014, before jumping to its peak position, 4, on 28 December 2014. On 27 December 2014, the song entered 91.9 Friends FM Bollywood Top 20 at position 17. On 2 January 2015, the song had a direct entry at position 14 in The Times of India Mirchi Top 20 Chart. The song also made its debut at No. 33 position in the Top 40 Asian Download Charts on 3 January 2015.

Year	Chart	Peak position	Ref.
2014	iTunes Indian Charts	4	
2014	91.9 Friends FM Bollywood Top 20	17	
2015	The Times of India Mirchi Top 20 Chart	14	
2015	Top Asian Download Charts	33	

== Critical reception ==
The song received mixed response from music critics. The use of guitar and violin in the composition of the song, along with vocals by Shreya Ghoshal were appreciated. The Indian Express reviewed the song as "one of the most uniquely composed numbers". They also mentioned the rendition by Ghoshal: "Known for her honeyed voice, the singer has further proved her versatility with this song".

Filmfare's Devesh Sharma praised the composition of the song and commented: "Sung with just the right amount of mischief by Shreya Ghoshal, the song is the "Behti Hawa Sa Tha Woh" quotient for PK, describing Aamir's mannerisms and antics". Bollywood Hungama's Rajiv Vijayakar commented: "Exquisitely sung, it is a piquant if outdated composition with good orchestration and a steady infectious beat". Swapnil Raje from IBNLive predicted that the catch phrase "Nanga Punga Dost" might gain a fan-following of its own. Rafat from Glamsham.com described the song as a "very lively and cute song that thrives on its superb rhythm".

Surabhi Redkar from Koimoi felt the song may not gain much popularity but it could sound much better in the film's frame since it is more connected to the film's story line. He further stated "The lyrics are extremely cute, that totally give you the friendly feel". Joginder Tuteja from Rediff.com described the song as a situational nursery rhyme and felt the song could get popular with kids due to its picturisation but "as a stand-alone number, it is just about average".
