= Dhritiman Mukherjee =

Indian professional photographer

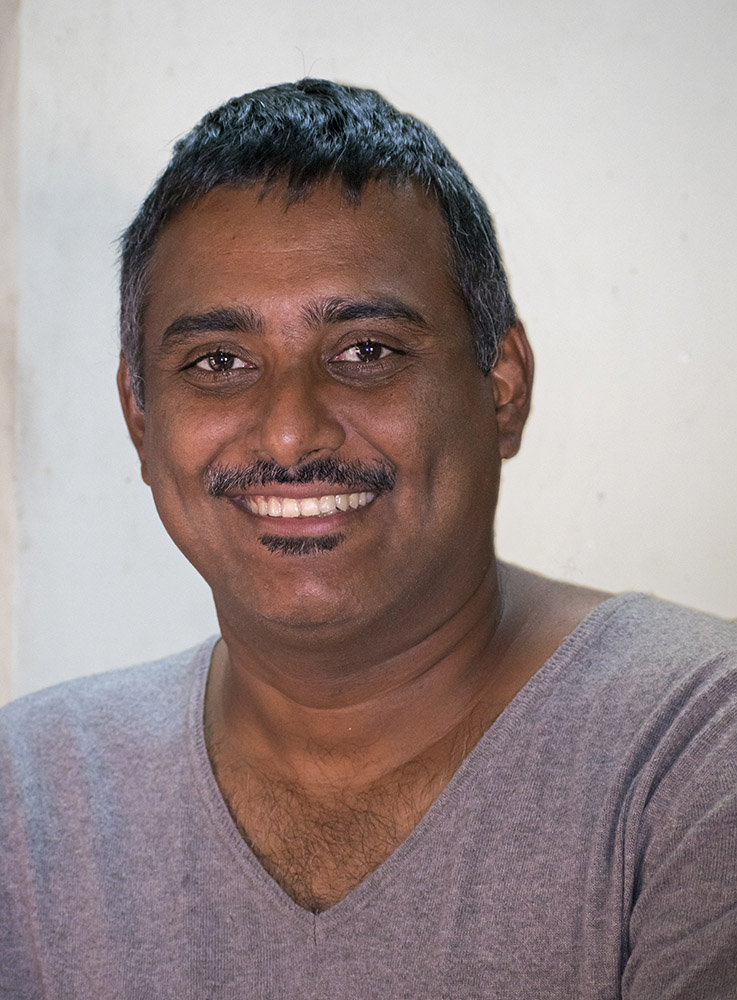
- Born: 1 January 1975 (age 51)
- Occupations: Nature, wildlife and conservation photographer

Dhritiman Mukherjee is an Indian professional nature, wildlife and conservation photographer. He is a certified advance open water diver, certified ice-diver and certified mountaineer.

His works have been published in several national and international prints and digital media including BBC, National Geographic, New York Times, Lonely Planet, WWF, London Geographic, Outlook Traveler, Telegraph, and The Guardian.

He is an ambassador of Roundglass and the founder of Saevus Magazine. He was appointed by Sony India as a Sony Explorer on 28 August 2019. He was also one of jury members of the professional category in the 6th National Award Photography Awards hosted by the Government of India.

== Career ==
Dhritiman started his career in nature, wildlife and conservation photography in 2000. Since then, he's spent the majority of each year in the field and has travelled extensively to cover wildlife across India and the world. Photographers in India, at that time, largely focused on larger mammals. However, he photographed rare and lesser-known species in India such as the Bengal Florican, Lesser Florican, Tragopans, Orange Bullfinch and Narcondam hornbill. His philosophy is to contribute to science and create awareness on conservation of wildlife, natural resource management and environment protection through his work.

In 2010, a team of eight people including Dhritiman traveled within the Great Himalayan National Park to observe rare peasants and the brown bear. On this expedition Dhritiman captured an image of the Western Tragopan, making him one of the first wildlife photographers to capture this species in the wild.

He has traveled to Svalbard and Greenland, where he captured detailed wildlife and aquatic activity, such as Crab-eater Seals, Orcas, and Penguins. He dove in Baikal lake to capture the elusive Nerpa seals. He has dived with Anacondas in the swamps of Brazil. He has shot all the five sharks that are considered most dangerous in terms of human casualties — the Great White Shark, the Tiger Shark, the Bull Shark, the Oceanic White Tip and the Hammerhead. His photograph of an Orange Bullfinch taken at Dachigam National Park is the only clear photo taken of the species. He has shot Mountain gorillas and Orcas and captured the American crocodiles in Banco Chinchorro off the Mexican coastline.

He has also captured some of the first pictures of Snow Leopards in Spiti Valley and in Ladakh, without using a camera trap.

Dhritiman undertook a 100-day journey across the Himalayas in 2016 along with Shantanu Moitra which was documented and published on YouTube called "100 days in Himalayas" produced by Roundglass. He has given invited talks to several policy makers, students, wildlife enthusiasts and photographers in institutes like Institute for Scientific and Engineering Research, Wildlife Institute of India, University of Pittsburgh.

== Personal life ==
Dhritiman was born in Barasat, suburban Kolkata, to Sadhan Mukherjee, an employee of Government of West Bengal, and Sandhya Mukherjee. His father was also a social worker and a humanitarian. Dhritiman has accredited his humility towards his work to his father's humanitarian work. He has two older sisters i.e., Nandini Mukherjee and Malini Chakraborty and is the youngest of three siblings. His parents have been a constant source of inspiration since his childhood, so much so that, quite unlikely for his time and upbringing, he was left to himself to choose his career or, rather, follow his passion. A reflection of his parents support reflected when they sold off a portion of their family home to help Dhritiman buy his first camera.

Apart from his parents, Dhritiman has also accredited Moushumi Ghosh, who has been a guardian and second mother and largely instrumental in him becoming a successful nature, wildlife and conservation photographer.

Dhritiman's formative years in developing his interest in wildlife also took place from to his association with Climbers Circle - an institute where he learnt his mountaineering skills and with Prakriti Samsad - a council of nature observers and research activities.

== Education ==
Dhritiman completed his higher secondary from Barasat Peary Charan Sarkar Government High School. He went on to graduate in Bachelor of Science from Barasat Government College. He has had no formal education in photography and is a self-taught photographer.

== Awards ==
Across the course of his 20 (twenty) years in wildlife and nature photography, Dhritiman has collected several awards and accolades. Some of the essential awards are as mentioned hereunder:

Year	Award	Category	Territory
2020	Wildlife Photographer Of The Year	Highly Commended	London
2020	BBC Wildlife Photographer of the Year	Highly Commended	London
2018	Siena Drone Awards - Runner up	Runner up - Wildlife category	Italy
2015	Kirloskar Vasundhara Mitra Award	Winner- Conservation	India
2014	Natures Best Windland Smith Rice International Awards competition	Winner - Wildlife category	USA
2014	Royal Bank of Scotland Earth Heroes Award	Winner - Inspire category	India
2013	Carl Zeiss Conservation Award	Winner - Wildlife category	India
2012	DJ Memorial Photography Contest	Winner - Nature category	India

== Publications ==
Dhritiman has co-authored a book with Dr. Asad R. Rahmani called Magical Biodiversity of India. The book takes the readers through a journey of 15 Indian landscapes. The book represents the biodiversity present in India from larger species to smaller species. Dhritiman's work has also been covered across several known platforms across the globe. Some of the publishers of his works include National Geographic, The Indian Express, The Guardian, The Times, and New Scientist.
