= Earth Heroes Award =

Awards instituted by Royal Bank of Scotland in association with WAZA in 2011

Earth Heroes Awards are awards instituted by Royal Bank of Scotland in association with World Association of Zoos and Aquariums (WAZA) in 2011.

== Award ==
=== Categories ===
There are several award categories include:-

- RBS Earth Hero Award (Felicitation) Individual
- RBS Earth Guardian Award (INR 1,50,000) – Institution
- RBS Save The Species Award (INR 1,50,000)– 2 Individuals
- RBS Inspire Award – (INR 1,50,000) Individual or Institutional
- RBS Green Warrior Award – (INR 1,50,000 each) 2 individuals

=== Selection Process ===
The finalist for each award would be selected by jury of experts from the field of conservation, bio-diversity, science, government, media, The Royal Bank of Scotland N.V, National Biodiversity Authority and the Bombay Natural History Society.

== Earth Heroes Awards 2014 ==
The RBS Earth Heroes Awards 2014 was announced at awards function held on 4 November at Indira Gandhi National Centre for Arts (IGNCA) in New Delhi.

=== Winners ===
- RBS Earth Hero Award - Dr. Erach Bharucha
- RBS Earth Guardian Award - Kenneth Anderson Nature Society (KANS)
- RBS Save The Species Award - Pangti Village Council & Dr. Goutam Narayan
- RBS Inspire Award - Mr. Dhritiman Mukherjee
- RBS Green Warrior Award - Mr. Sujoy Banerjee & Shri. P. S. Somashekhar

Special Mention during 'Earth Heroes Awards' has been addressed to Padmaja Naidu Himalayan Zoological Park or Darjeeling Zoo, India's largest high altitude zoo, established on 14 August 1958.
