= HMS Shalimar =

S-class submarine for the Royal Navy

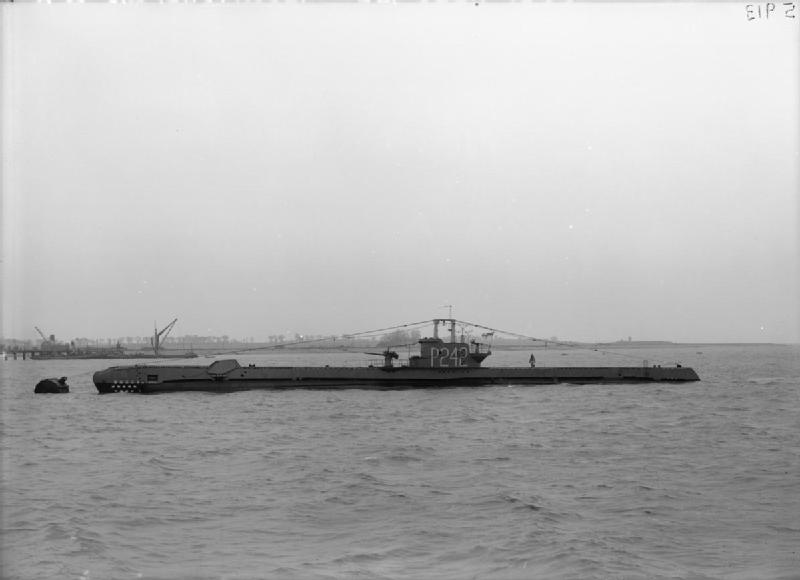
- HMS Shalimar

History

United Kingdom
- Name: HMS Shalimar
- Ordered: 3 August 1941
- Builder: Chatham Dockyard
- Laid down: 17 April 1942
- Launched: 22 April 1943
- Commissioned: 22 April 1944
- Fate: Sold for breaking up July 1950
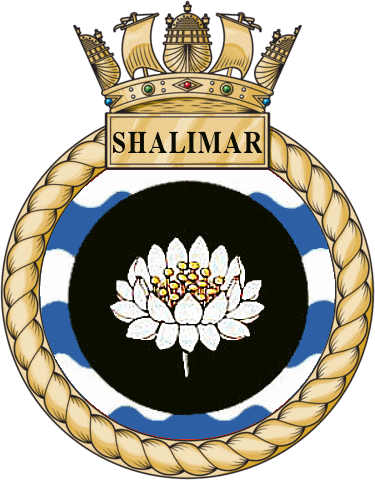
- Badge

General characteristics
- Class & type: S-class submarine
- Displacement: 842 long tons (856 t) surfaced; 990 long tons (1,010 t) submerged
- Length: 217 ft (66.1 m)
- Beam: 23 ft 9 in (7.2 m)
- Draught: 14 ft 8 in (4.5 m)
- Installed power: 1,900 bhp (1,400 kW) (diesel); 1,300 hp (970 kW) (electric)
- Propulsion: 2 × diesel engines; 2 × electric motors
- Speed: 15 knots (28 km/h; 17 mph) surfaced; 10 knots (19 km/h; 12 mph) submerged
- Range: 6,000 nmi (11,000 km; 6,900 mi) at 10 knots (19 km/h; 12 mph) surface; 120 nmi (220 km; 140 mi) at 3 knots (5.6 km/h; 3.5 mph) submerged
- Test depth: 300 feet (91.4 m)
- Complement: 48
- Armament: 7 × 21 in (533 mm) torpedo tubes (6 bow, 1 stern); 1 × 3-inch (76 mm) deck gun

HMS Shalimar (P242) was a third-batch S-class submarine built for the Royal Navy during World War II. Completed in April 1944, she conducted one war patrol off the Orkney Islands, then was assigned to the Pacific theater, arriving there in September. The submarine conducted one war patrol off the Nicobar Islands, destroying several small ships with gunfire. During her next three patrols in the Strait of Malacca, Shalimar sank twelve sailing vessels, eleven landing craft, four coasters, three lighters, three tugboats, and one minesweeper. After the war ended, the boat was sent back to England, placed in reserve, then sold for scrap in July 1950.

== Design and description ==
The third batch was slightly enlarged and improved over the preceding second batch of the S-class. The submarines had a length of 217 feet (66.1 m) overall, a beam of 23 feet 9 inches (7.2 m) and a draught of 14 feet 8 inches (4.5 m). They displaced 842 long tons (856 t) on the surface and 990 long tons (1,010 t) submerged. The S-class submarines had a crew of 48 officers and ratings. They had a diving depth of 300 feet (91.4 m).

For surface running, the boats were powered by two 950-brake-horsepower (708 kW) diesel engines, each driving one propeller shaft. When submerged each propeller was driven by a 650-horsepower (485 kW) electric motor. They could reach 15 knots (28 km/h; 17 mph) on the surface and 10 knots (19 km/h; 12 mph) underwater. On the surface, the third batch boats had a range of 6,000 nautical miles (11,000 km; 6,900 mi) at 10 knots (19 km/h; 12 mph) and 120 nmi (220 km; 140 mi) at 3 knots (5.6 km/h; 3.5 mph) submerged.

The boats were armed with seven 21-inch (533 mm) torpedo tubes. A half-dozen of these were in the bow and there was one external tube in the stern. They carried six reload torpedoes for the bow tubes for a grand total of thirteen torpedoes. Twelve mines could be carried in lieu of the internally stowed torpedoes. They were also armed with a 3-inch (76 mm) deck gun.

== Construction and career ==
HMS Shalimar was a third-batch S-class submarine and was ordered by the British Admiralty on 3 August 1941. She was laid down in the Chatham Dockyard in Kent on 17 April 1942 and was launched on 22 April 1943. On 22 April 1944, Shalimar, under the command of Lieutenant William G. Meeke, was commissioned into the Royal Navy in Holy Loch. The submarine was named after Shalimar Bagh, a mughal garden in India; thus far, she has been the only ship to bear the name "Shalimar".

After going through speed, gunnery, and torpedo firing exercises, Shalimar departed Holy Loch on 8 July 1944 for her first war patrol, east of the Orkney Islands on an anti-submarine patrol. She returned on 27 July, without having sighted any targets. The boat was then assigned to the Pacific theater, fighting against Imperial Japan. Passing through Gibraltar and Suez, she arrived in Trincomalee on 28 September.

On 15 October, Shalimar departed port to patrol south of the Nicobar Islands; on the 26th, she attempted to torpedo a merchant ship leaving Port Blair, but was spotted, depth charged, and forced to dive. Three days later, the submarine fired six torpedoes at another merchant, but again missed. On 2 November, she met better luck and destroyed five Japanese landing craft, several small vessels, and a jetty with gunfire from her main 3-inch (76mm) deck gun. She then ended her patrol on the 6th.

The boat commenced her next patrol on 29 November 1944, this time in the Strait of Malacca; on 4 December she sank a sailing vessel with gunfire, then sank three more the following day. On 6 December, the boat fired three torpedoes at a coaster and a landing craft; they were observed to run under the targets, so she surfaced to use her deck gun. However, radar soon picked up an enemy aircraft, and Shalimar was forced to disengage. On the 10th and 11th, she sank two sailing vessels with gunfire, then on 14 December torpedoed and sank the Japanese minesweeper Choun Maru No.7. The next day, she sank a Japanese tugboat and two lighters, then returned to Trincomalee six day later.

On 12 January 1945, Shalimar left port, again tasked with patrolling the Strait of Malacca; on the 17th, she destroyed five Japanese landing craft with gunfire. The next day, she sank three sailing vessels, then two days later sank a coaster with gunfire. On the 21st the boat attacked a Japanese submarine with a full volley of six torpedoes, plus the rear one, but one torpedo detonated prematurely and the target turned away. Having expended all her ammo, Shalimar sank another coaster with star shells and Oerlikon 20mm fire on the 27th and on the 31st damaged a coaster with her 20mm and Vickers machine gun, after which the submarine fired two torpedoes, but both hit the bottom and the attack was abandoned. The submarine ended her patrol on 5 February, then sailed to Colombo for repairs and refitting.

On 18 July 1945, the submarine departed on another patrol in the Strait of Malacca, together with HMS Seadog. On 27 July they sank a Japanese tank landing craft, then on 1 August, Shalimar sank a sailing vessel with demolition charges and a lugger with gunfire. The following day, the pair sank a tug and a lighter, then went on to sink another tug and a barge the next day, after which the submarine was bombed by an aircraft but sustained only light damage. On 5 August, Shalimar and Seadog sank a coaster, then separated to deal with different targets; Shalimar sank two sailing vessels, then sank a coaster two days later. The submarine ended her last war patrol on 12 August, then departed for Britain, arriving in Portsmouth on 23 October. The boat was placed in reserve at Harwich a week later, then was sold in July 1950 to be broken up at Troon, Scotland.
