= HMS Seadog =

Submarine

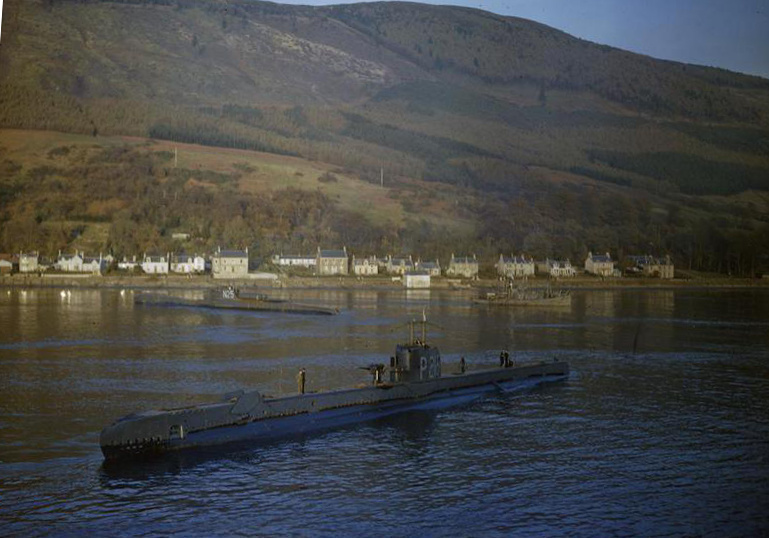
- Seadog in Holy Loch (1942), in the background is Thunderbolt

History

United Kingdom
- Name: Seadog
- Ordered: 2 April 1940
- Builder: Cammell Laird, Birkenhead
- Laid down: 31 December 1940
- Launched: 11 June 1942
- Completed: 22 September 1942
- Commissioned: 24 September 1942
- Identification: Pennant number 216
- Fate: Broken up, August 1948

General characteristics
- Class & type: S-class submarine
- Displacement: 865 long tons (879 t) (surfaced); 990 long tons (1,010 t) (submerged)
- Length: 217 ft (66.1 m)
- Beam: 23 ft 9 in (7.2 m)
- Draught: 14 ft 8 in (4.5 m)
- Installed power: 1,900 bhp (1,400 kW) (diesel); 1,300 hp (970 kW) (electric)
- Propulsion: 2 × diesel engines; 2 × electric motors
- Speed: 15 kn (28 km/h; 17 mph) (surfaced); 10 kn (19 km/h; 12 mph) (submerged)
- Range: 6,000 nmi (11,000 km; 6,900 mi) at 10 knots (19 km/h; 12 mph) (surfaced); 120 nmi (220 km; 140 mi) at 3 knots (5.6 km/h; 3.5 mph) (submerged)
- Test depth: 300 ft (91.4 m)
- Complement: 48
- Sensors & processing systems: Type 129AR or 138 ASDIC; Type 291 early-warning radar
- Armament: 7 × 21 in (533 mm) torpedo tubes (6 × bow, 1 × stern); 1 × 3 in (76 mm) deck gun; 1 × 20 mm (0.8 in) AA gun (added later)

HMS Seadog was a third-batch S-class submarine built for the Royal Navy during World War II. Completed in September 1942, she spent most of her career in Arctic waters, off Norway, but sank only one German ship in 13 patrols. In January 1945, she was redeployed to the Far East, meeting more success. On her first patrol in the area, the submarine rescued four American airmen. After two patrols, she and her sister ship HMS Shalimar sank five sailing vessels, two coasters, a barge, a tugboat and a Japanese tank landing ship. After the war ended, Seadog was sent back to England, placed in reserve, then sold for scrap in December 1947. She was ultimately broken up in August 1948.

== Design and description ==
The S-class submarines were designed to patrol the restricted waters of the North Sea and the Mediterranean Sea. The third batch was slightly enlarged and improved over the preceding second batch of the S class. The submarines had a length of 217 feet (66.1 m) overall, a beam of 23 feet 9 inches (7.2 m) and a draught of 14 feet 8 inches (4.5 m). They displaced 865 long tons (879 t) on the surface and 990 long tons (1,010 t) submerged. The S-class submarines had a crew of 48 officers and ratings. They had a diving depth of 300 feet (91.4 m).

For surface running, the boats were powered by two 950-brake-horsepower (708 kW) diesel engines, each driving one propeller shaft. When submerged each propeller was driven by a 650-horsepower (485 kW) electric motor. They could reach 15 knots (28 km/h; 17 mph) on the surface and 10 knots (19 km/h; 12 mph) underwater. On the surface, the third batch boats had a range of 6,000 nautical miles (11,000 km; 6,900 mi) at 10 knots (19 km/h; 12 mph) and 120 nmi (220 km; 140 mi) at 3 knots (5.6 km/h; 3.5 mph) submerged.

The boats were armed with seven 21-inch (533 mm) torpedo tubes. A half-dozen of these were in the bow and there was one external tube in the stern. They carried six reload torpedoes for the bow tubes for a grand total of thirteen torpedoes. Twelve mines could be carried in lieu of the internally stowed torpedoes. They were also armed with a 3-inch (76 mm) deck gun. The third-batch S-class boats were fitted with either a Type 129AR or 138 ASDIC system and a Type 291 or 291W early-warning radar.

== Construction and career ==
HMS Seadog was a third-batch S-class submarine and was ordered by the British Admiralty on 2 April 1940. She was laid down in the Cammell Laird shipyard in Birkenhead on 31 December 1940 and was launched on 11 June 1942. On 22 September 1942, Seadog, under the command of Lieutenant Anthony Daniell, sailed to Holy Loch, where she was commissioned into the Royal Navy two days later. The submarine was named after a term for old seasoned sailors; thus far, she has been the only ship to bear the name "Seadog".

Between November 1942 and February 1943, Seadog conducted three patrols off Norway, protecting Arctic convoys to and from Northern Russia, but did not sight any potential targets. After her first patrol, the boat was commanded by Desmond Martin. Returning from these operations, the submarine docked in Ardrossan to have a 20-millimetre (0.8 in) Oerlikon light anti-aircraft gun added aft of the conning tower and additional equipment installed.

After her refit, Seadog departed port on 2 June 1943 on an anti-submarine patrol in Arctic waters, off Norway. After four days at sea, she sighted a Type IX submarine, probably the German submarine U-536, but it dived before torpedoes could be launched. On 10 June, Seadog obtained an ASDIC contact with a U-boat and blindly launched a torpedo in its direction, but missed; it may have been the German submarine U-417, which was sunk the next day by aircraft. Seadog returned from patrol on 18 June.

The submarine conducted another patrol in the Arctic, taking part in Operation Corncrake, picking up Norwegian commandos on the island of Spitsbergen, and missed another German U-boat. Seadog commenced another anti-submarine patrol on 3 August, this time in the Bay of Biscay. On 13 August, the submarine stopped and boarded the small French fishing vessel St. Moquet, interrogated its crew, and examined its papers. They then released the ship and were given 12 tunas, which "made a nice meal". The submarine then returned to England on 17 August.

Between mid-September and early December 1943, Seadog conducted three patrols off Norway, but was unsuccessful in spotting targets; during her first, she landed a relief force on Spitsbergen. The submarine departed on another patrol on 24 December, operating off Stadlandet, Norway, meeting more luck—after four days at sea, she sank the German transport Oldenburg with a full salvo of six torpedoes; a depth charge counter-attack by the ship's escort followed, but did not cause damage. Seadog later attacked two other convoys, but missed. Out of torpedoes, the boat returned to Lerwick, on 4 January 1944.

=== Far East ===
After two more patrols in the North, Seadog was redeployed to the Far East, passing through Gibraltar, Malta, and the Suez Canal. She arrived at Trincomalee, Ceylon on 17 January 1945, after which she briefly underwent training. A month later, the boat departed for a patrol in the Gulf of Bengal; on 26 February, she rescued four US airmen in the Bay of Bengal, and rendezvoused with a Consolidated PBY Catalina to transfer them. Seadog then damaged with gunfire and possibly destroyed a Japanese coastal trading vessel on 6 March, before returning to port on 12 March.

On her next patrol, the submarine sank a coaster with torpedoes off Ulèë Lheuë, Sumatra, and a sailing vessel near Sigli. After an uneventful patrol in the Strait of Malacca, Seadog started another patrol in the area, together with HMS Shalimar, on 18 July. On the 24 and 26 July, she sank two Japanese sailing vessels, and the next day she attacked and destroyed a Japanese tank landing craft with Shalimar. There is also a report of Seadog sinking the Japanese minelayer Kuroshio No. 1 on 27 July, but this is not mentioned in the submarine's log book. After sinking another sailing vessel in the evening, the two submarines went on to sink two coasters, a barge, two sailing vessels, and a tugboat, all with their deck guns, before returning to port on 12 August. Three days later, Imperial Japan announced it would surrender, and Seadog was sent back to Great Britain, passing through Suez and Gibraltar, and arriving on 18 October.

After the war, Seadog was placed in reserve, then was sold for scrap metal on 24 December 1947. She was broken up at Troon, Scotland, in August 1948.

== Career Summary ==
During her service with the Royal Navy, Seadog sank 13 ships for a confirmed total of 8,537 gross register tons (GRT), plus an estimated 870 GRT of small Japanese ships.

Date	Name of ship	Tonnage	Nationality	Fate and location
28 December 1943	Oldenburg	8,537	Germany	Torpedoed and sunk at 62°15′N 05°09′E
18 May 1945	unidentified	~300	Japan	Torpedoed and sunk off Ulèë Lheuë, Sumatra
20 May 1945	unidentified	-	Japan	Sunk with gunfire off Sigli, Sumatra
24 July 1945	unidentified	~50	Japan	Sunk with gunfire at 03°39′N 100°37′E
26 July 1945	unidentified	-	Japan	Sunk with demolition charges off Cape Rachado, Malaya
27 July 1945	unidentified tank landing ship	-	Imperial Japanese Navy	Sunk with gunfire at 2°22′N 101°51′E, in conjunction with HMS Shalimar
27 July 1945	unidentified	~20	Japan	Sunk with gunfire off Cape Rachado, Malaya
29 July 1945	unidentified	~80	Japan	Sunk with demolition charges near the mouth of the Malacca River
1 August 1945	unidentified	-	Japan	Sunk with gunfire near 03°06′N 99°58′E, in conjunction with Shalimar
2 August 1945	unidentified	-	Japan	Sunk with gunfire near the Malacca River, in conjunction with Shalimar
2 August 1945	unidentified	-	Japan	Sunk with gunfire near the Malacca River, in conjunction with Shalimar
5 August 1945	unidentified	~300	Japan	Sunk with gunfire near Malacca
5 August 1945	unidentified	~120	Japan	Sunk with gunfire near Malacca
