= No.1-class patrol boat (1945) =

Ship of the Imperial Japanese Navy

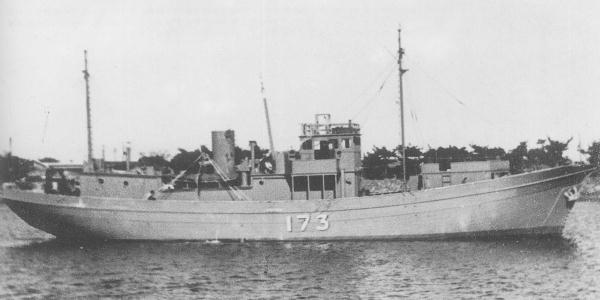
- Auxiliary Patrol Boat No.173 on 10 January 1945

Class overview
- Name: No.1 class
- Builders: Hull; Ichikawa Shipyard; Gōriki Shipyard; Koyanagi Shipyard; Saga Iron Works; Shikoku Dock Company; Jinen Iron Works; Tokushima Limited Sipyard; Nishii Shipyard; Hayashikane Heavy Industries; Fukuoka Iron Works; Fukushima Iron Works; Funaya Iron Works; Miho Shipyard; Murakami Shipyard; Yamanishi Iron Works; Yonago Shipyard; Fitted with armaments; Kure Naval Arsenal; Maizuru Naval Arsenal; Sasebo Naval Arsenal; Yokosuka Naval Arsenal
- Operators: Imperial Japanese Navy; Japan Maritime Safety Agency; Japan Coastal Safety Force; Government of Japan
- Built: 1944–1945
- In commission: 1945 (IJN)
- Planned: 280
- Completed: 27 (IJN)
- Canceled: 223
- Lost: 5 (wartime)
- Retired: 22 (IJN)

General characteristics
- Type: Patrol boat
- Displacement: 238 long tons (242 t) standard
- Length: 28.50 m (93 ft 6 in) overall
- Beam: 6.14 m (20 ft 2 in)
- Draught: 2.35 m (7 ft 9 in)
- Propulsion: 1 × intermediate diesel; shingle shaft, 400 bhp
- Speed: 9.0 knots (16.7 km/h; 10.4 mph)
- Range: 4,000 nmi (7,400 km; 4,600 mi) at 8.0 kn (14.8 km/h; 9.2 mph)
- Complement: 34
- Armament: 4 × Type 96 25 mm AA guns; 12 × depth charges; 1 × Mk.13 early warning radar; 1 × Type 3 active sonar

The No.1-class patrol boat (第一号型哨戒特務艇,, Dai Ichi Gō-gata Shōkai-Tokumutei) was a class of auxiliary patrol boat (picket boat) of the Imperial Japanese Navy (IJN), serving during World War II. 280 vessels were planned under the Maru Sen Programme (Ship # 2121–2400), however, only 27 vessels were completed before the end of the war.

== Background ==
- During the war, Japan commandeered a large number of fishing boats for picket boat duty, with the primary duty of observing the sea to the east of the mainland. Their primary duty was to provide early warning of any U.S. Task Force attempting to close the Japan mainland. Some of the picket trawlers accomplished their duties, but this was typically by means of failing to respond to hails after encountering the enemy. the IJN decided to build a specialized picket boat to replace the large number of vessels lost in the course of duty.
- The IJN intended to build 280 picket boats, however, the IJN was not able to procure sufficient wood to build the full number. The IJN built only 27 vessels before the end of the war. Those that survived war played an active part in the post-war minesweeping effort (primarily of magnetic mines) in company with the No.1-class auxiliary submarine chasers.

== Ships in class ==
- Auxiliary Patrol Boat No.1, completed on 28 March 1945, survived war.
- Auxiliary Patrol Boat No.2, completed on 20 May 1945, survived war.
- Auxiliary Patrol Boat No.3, completed on 5 August 1945, survived war.
- Auxiliary Patrol Boat No.4, incomplete, rebuilt to fishing boat in postwar.
- Ship No.2125 to No.2144, cancelled in 1945.
- Auxiliary Patrol Boat No.25, completed on 27 April 1945, survived war, sunk by rough weather on 18 September 1945.
- Auxiliary Patrol Boat No.26, completed on 2 August 1945, survived war, rebuilt to fishing boat in postwar.
- Auxiliary Patrol Boat No.27, incomplete, scrapped in postwar.
- Ship No.2148 to No.2150, cancelled in 1945.
- Auxiliary Patrol Boat No.31, completed on 29 July 1945, survived war, transferred to Japan Maritime Safety Agency and renamed MS 18 on 1 May 1948.
- Auxiliary Patrol Boat No.32, incomplete, rebuilt to fishing boat in postwar.
- Auxiliary Patrol Boat No.33, 90% complete, rebuilt to fishing boat in postwar.
- Auxiliary Patrol Boat No.34, 80% complete, rebuilt to fishing boat in postwar.
- Ship No.2155 and 2156, cancelled in 1945.
- Auxiliary Patrol Boat No.37, completed on 2 June 1945, sunk by air raid on 18 July 1945 at Yokosuka.
- Auxiliary Patrol Boat No.38, 90% complete, scrapped in postwar.
- Ship No.2159 to No.2173, cancelled in 1945.
- Auxiliary Patrol Boat No.54, completed on 5 August, survived war, filled and sunk in postwar.
- Auxiliary Patrol Boat No.55, 95% complete.
- Ship No.2176 to No.2183, cancelled in 1945.
- Auxiliary Patrol Boat No.64, incomplete, rebuilt to fishing boat in postwar.
- Auxiliary Patrol Boat No.65, 90% complete, rebuilt to fishing boat in postwar.
- Auxiliary Patrol Boat No.66, 80% complete.
- Ship No.2187 to No.2203, cancelled in 1945.
- Auxiliary Patrol Boat No.84, completed on 7 June 1945, survived war, transferred to Japan Maritime Safety Agency and renamed MS 19 on 1 May 1948.
- Auxiliary Patrol Boat No.85, 95% complete, rebuilt to fishing boat in postwar.
- Auxiliary Patrol Boat No.86, 70% complete.
- Ship No.2207 to No.2209, cancelled in 1945.
- Auxiliary Patrol Boat No.90, completed on 11 April 1945, survived war, struck a naval mine and sunk in postwar.
- Auxiliary Patrol Boat No.91, 99% complete.
- Auxiliary Patrol Boat No.92, 95% complete.
- Auxiliary Patrol Boat No.93, 80% complete.
- Ship No.2214 to No.2229, cancelled in 1945.
- Auxiliary Patrol Boat No.110, incomplete, sunk by air raid on 18 July 1945 at Yokosuka.
- Auxiliary Patrol Boat No.111, 99% complete.
- Ship No.2232 to No.2241, cancelled in 1945.
- Auxiliary Patrol Boat No.122, incomplete, sunk by air raid on 18 July 1945 at Yokosuka.
- Auxiliary Patrol Boat No.123, incomplete.
- Ship No.2244 to No.2252, cancelled in 1945.
- Auxiliary Patrol Boat No.134, completed on 26 February 1945, survived war, transferred to Japan Maritime Safety Agency and renamed MS 20 on 1 May 1948.
- Auxiliary Patrol Boat No.135, completed on 23 May 1945, survived war, transferred to Japan Maritime Safety Agency and renamed MS 21 on 1 May 1948.
- Auxiliary Patrol Boat No.136, completed on 5 June 1945, survived war, transferred to Japan Maritime Safety Agency and renamed MS 22 on 1 May 1948.
- Auxiliary Patrol Boat No.137, completed on 15 July 1945, survived war, sunk by rough weather on 18 April 1946.
- Auxiliary Patrol Boat No.138, completed on 11 August 1945, survived war, transferred to Japan Maritime Safety Agency and renamed MS 23 on 1 May 1948.
- Auxiliary Patrol Boat No.139, incomplete, transferred to Japan Maritime Safety Agency and renamed MS 24 on 1 May 1948.
- Auxiliary Patrol Boat No.140, 90% complete.
- Ship No.2261 to No.2271, cancelled in 1945.
- Auxiliary Patrol Boat No.152, completed on 23 May 1945, survived war, transferred to Japan Maritime Safety Agency and renamed MS 25 on 1 May 1948.
- Auxiliary Patrol Boat No.153, completed on 23 July 1945, survived war, transferred to Japan Maritime Safety Agency and renamed MS 26 on 1 May 1948.
- Auxiliary Patrol Boat No.154, incomplete, transferred to Japan Maritime Safety Agency and renamed MS 27 on 1 May 1948.
- Auxiliary Patrol Boat No.155, 90% complete.
- Auxiliary Patrol Boat No.156, incomplete.
- Ship No.2277 to No.2282, cancelled in 1945.
- Auxiliary Patrol Boat No.163, completed on 10 February 1945, survived war, struck a naval mine and sunk on 22 August 1945.
- Auxiliary Patrol Boat No.164, completed on 2 March 1945, agrounded on 30 May 1945, later scrapped.
- Auxiliary Patrol Boat No.165, completed on 15 May 1945, survived war, filled and sunk in postwar.
- Auxiliary Patrol Boat No.166, completed on 23 July 1945, sunk by air raid on 12 August 1945 off Onomichi.
- Ship No.2287 to No.2292, cancelled in 1945.
- Auxiliary Patrol Boat No.173, completed on 26 March 1945, struck a naval mine and sunk on 29 March 1945, later refloated and scrapped.
- Auxiliary Patrol Boat No.174, completed on 10 May 1945, survived war.
- Auxiliary Patrol Boat No.175, completed on 23 June 1945, survived war, transferred to Japan Maritime Safety Agency and renamed MS 28 on 1 May 1948.
- Auxiliary Patrol Boat No.176, incomplete, sunk by rough weather on 18 April 1946.
- Auxiliary Patrol Boat No.177, incomplete, burned by air raid on 4 July 1945.
- Auxiliary Patrol Boat No.178, incomplete, burned by air raid on 4 July 1945.
- Auxiliary Patrol Boat No.179, completed on 20 May 1945, survived war, transferred to Japan Maritime Safety Agency and renamed MS 29 on 1 May 1948.
- Auxiliary Patrol Boat No.180, incomplete, filled and sunk in postwar.
- Auxiliary Patrol Boat No.181, incomplete.
- Ship No.2302 to No.2310, cancelled in 1945.
- Auxiliary Patrol Boat No.191, completed on 27 March 1945, survived war, transferred to Japan Maritime Safety Agency and renamed MS 30 on 1 May 1948.
- Auxiliary Patrol Boat No.192, completed on 27 July 1945, agrounded on 27 October 1945, later scrapped.
- Auxiliary Patrol Boat No.193, 70% complete, sunk by typhoon on 18 September 1945.
- Ship No.2314 to No.2400, cancelled in 1945.

== See also ==
- Radar picket
- Maritime Safety Agency
- Second Bureau of the Demobilization Ministry

== Bibliography ==
- "Rekishi Gunzō"., History of Pacific War Vol.37, Support vessels of the Imperial Japanese Forces, Gakken (Japan), June 2002, ISBN 4-05-602780-3
- Ships of the World special issue Vol.45, Escort Vessels of the Imperial Japanese Navy, Kaijinsha, (Japan), February 1996
- Model Art Extra No.340, Drawings of Imperial Japanese Naval Vessels Part-1, Model Art Co. Ltd. (Japan), October 1989
- The Maru Special, Japanese Naval Vessels No.49, Japanese submarine chasers, Ushio Shobō (Japan), March 1981
