= Shantanu Moitra =

Indian composer (born 1968)

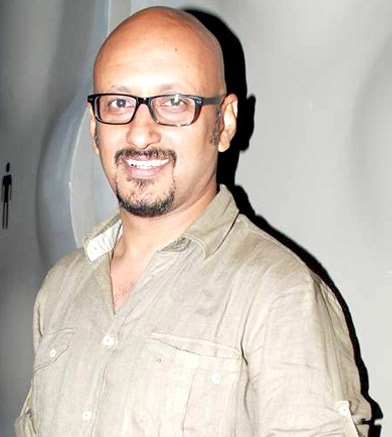

Background information
- Born: 22 January 1968 (age 58); Lucknow, Uttar Pradesh, India
- Occupations: Pianist, Composer
- Instruments: Piano; guitar; bass; leads; keyboard; vocals
- Years active: Since 1995-present
- Website: www.shantanumoitra.in

Shantanu Moitra (born 22 January 1968) is an Indian pianist, score composer and musician who has composed songs for the Hindi film industry, and is most known for his scores in the films Parineeta (2005), Hazaaron Khwaishein Aisi (2005), Lage Raho Munnabhai (2006) and 3 Idiots (2009), and private albums, Mann ke Manjeere and Ab ke Saawan sung by Shubha Mudgal. In 2014, he received the National Film Award for Best Music Direction (Background Score) for Na Bangaaru Talli.

== Early life and education ==
Shantanu was born in Lucknow, where his father came from a Bengali Brahmin musical family. He was very young when he moved to Delhi with his family, where initially he lived in Patel Nagar in West Delhi, and studied at Springdales School, Pusa Road. There, he was the leader and singer of a band, and in 1982, the band hosted the school's first rock show. "What was even better was receiving an award in school for my contribution to music at a time when my school, Springdales in Delhi, didn't usually give awards for music. When I look back now, I think the award instilled huge confidence in me," he said.

They also received musical training from urban-folk singer, Sushmit Bose, a Springdales alumnus, who would occasionally drop in and teach them. Later he moved to Chittaranjan Park in South Delhi.

He studied at Deshbandhu College, Kalkaji, Delhi University and has a degree in Economics.

== Career ==
Moitra started his career as a client servicing executive at an ad agency, while music remained a hobby. He started composing music for advertising jingles accidentally, when he was asked to compose a jingle at the last minute by Pradeep Sarkar, then the Creative Head of the agency. The jingle was "Bole mere lips. I love Uncle Chipps" for the chips brand Uncle Chipps, which became an instant hit. He later composed several jingles for Pradeep Sarkar, and several advertising brands.

This led to composing music for Indipop albums that were hits including Ab ke Saawan, Mann ke Manjeere: an album of women's dreams for Breakthrough, and Sapna Dekha Hai Maine (2003) for Shubha Mudgal.

Moitra moved to Mumbai in 2002, when he started working for Sudhir Mishra's Hazaaron Khwaishein Aisi, his first signed film. He soon formed a team with lyricist Swanand Kirkire, starting with the song "Bawara Mann..". Even before Parineeta was made, he had created a song called Raath Hamari To, sung by Chitra, which Vidhu Vinod Chopra the producer of Parineeta heard, and subsequently on his recommendation, he went on do his first Bollywood project- Parineeta (2005), directed by Pradeep Sarkar.

Moitra gained recognition with his music in Parineeta (2005). His music was critically acclaimed and he received a nomination for the Filmfare Best Music Director Award. That same year he won the Filmfare RD Burman Award for New Music Talent. In 2009, he composed the score for his first Bengali film, Antaheen.

He was also a judge for two seasons of Sa Re Ga Ma Pa Bangla, a regional spinoff of the show Sa Re Ga Ma Pa.

He also wrote the book Ferari Mon - Memories by Santanu Moitra in Bengali, published by Sudhangshu Sekhar Dey, Dey's Publishing.

Shantanu also undertook a 100-day journey across the Himalayas in 2016 along with Dhritiman Mukherjee which was documented and published on YouTube called “100 days in Himalayas” produced by Roundglass.

== Discography ==
=== As a music director ===
Year	Film	Notes
2002	Pyaar Ki Dhun	
2002	Leela	
2005	Hazaaron Khwaishein Aisi	
2005	Parineeta	Filmfare RD Burman Award for New Music Talent
2005	Yahaan	
2005	7½ Phere	
2005	Kal: Yesterday and Tomorrow	
2006	Lage Raho Munna Bhai	
2007	Khoya Khoya Chand	
2007	Eklavya: The Royal Guard	
2007	Laaga Chunari Mein Daag	
2008	Welcome to Sajjanpur	
2009	Antaheen	Bengali film
2009	Phir Kabhi	
2009	3 Idiots	
2010	Well Done Abba	
2010	Raajneeti	One song, "Ishq Barse"
2012	Coke Studio 2	Season 2 Episode 7
2012	Chakravyuh	
2012	Krishna Aur Kans	
2012	Shoebite	
2012	Paanch Adhyay	Bengali film
2012	Aparajita Tumi	Bengali film
2013	Inkaar	
2013	Madras Cafe	
2013	Naa Bangaaru Talli	Bilingual film (Telugu and Malayalam)
2014	Buno Haansh	Bengali film
2014	Bobby Jasoos	
2014	PK	
2016	Wazir	
2016	Pink	
2016	Gulzar in conversation with Tagore	Hindi music album
2018	October	
2019	Aadhar	
2020	Gulabo Sitabo	One song, "Kanjoos"
2021	Kaadan	Trilingual film (Hindi, Tamil, and Telugu)
2021	Sardar Udham	
2022	Sherdil	All Songs
2023	Lost	
2023	12th Fail	
2023	Kadak Singh	
2023	Pradhan	Bengali film
2026	Keu Bole Biplobi Keu Bole Dakat †	All Songs

=== As a playback singer ===
Year	Film	Song	Composer	Notes
2009	3 Idiots	"Behti Hawa Sa Tha Woh"	Shantanu Moitra	
2013	Inkaar	"Maula Tu Malik Hai"	Shantanu Moitra	

=== As a background score composer ===
Year	Film	Notes
2009	3 Idiots	With Sanjay Wanderkar & Atul Raninga; Won IIFA Award for Best Background Score
2013	Ente	Malayalam Film
2013	Na Bangaaru Talli	Won National Film Award for Best Music Direction (Best Background Score)
2018	October	
2020	Gulabo Sitabo	
2021	Sardar Udham	
2023	Lost	
2023	12th Fail	

== Awards ==
National Film Awards

- National Film Award for Best Music Direction (Background Score) -Na Bangaaru Talli (2013)

Filmfare Awards

- Filmfare RD Burman Award for New Music Talent – Parineeta(2006)
- Filmfare Award for Best Background Score - Sardar Udham (2022)

Filmfare Awards Bangla

- Best Music Director- Projapoti Biskut (2018)
- Best Music Director- Prem Tame (2022)

Mirchi Music Awards

- Background Score of the Year - Madras Cafe (2013)

International Indian Film Academy Awards

- Background Score of the Year - 3 Idiots (2009)
