= PK (film) =

2014 Indian film by Rajkumar Hirani

- Theatrical release poster
- Directed by: Rajkumar Hirani
- Written by: Rajkumar Hirani; Abhijat Joshi
- Produced by: Vidhu Vinod Chopra; Rajkumar Hirani
- Starring: Aamir Khan; Anushka Sharma; Sushant Singh Rajput; Boman Irani; Saurabh Shukla; Sanjay Dutt
- Cinematography: C. K. Muraleedharan
- Edited by: Rajkumar Hirani
- Music by: Songs: Shantanu Moitra; Guest Composers: Ajay–Atul; Ankit Tiwari; Background Score: Sanjay Wandrekar; Atul Raninga
- Production companies: Vinod Chopra Films; Rajkumar Hirani Films
- Distributed by: UTV Motion Pictures
- Release date: 19 December 2014
- Running time: 152 minutes
- Country: India
- Language: Hindi
- Budget: ₹122 crore
- Box office: ₹769.89 crore

PK (Tipsy) is a 2014 Indian Hindi-language science-fiction comedy-drama film edited and directed by Rajkumar Hirani and written by Hirani and Abhijat Joshi and jointly produced by Hirani and Vidhu Vinod Chopra under the production banners of Rajkumar Hirani Films and Vinod Chopra Films, respectively. A religious satire addressing superstition and pseudoprophets, the film stars an ensemble cast of Aamir Khan (as the title character), Anushka Sharma, Sushant Singh Rajput, Boman Irani, Saurabh Shukla and Sanjay Dutt. Khan plays a humanoid alien who was sent to Earth on a research mission. After losing the remote with which he contacts his spaceship, he is told by the people of Earth to seek God's help - leading him to start a national movement which questions organised religion as a whole.

After the success of 3 Idiots (2009), Hirani and Joshi began scripting their next project; finding similarities with the plot of Inception (2010), they scrapped the film. It was later rewritten with a different angle and tone. During production, the film was initially titled Talli and later Ek Tha Talli before being changed to PK as the latter title was found to be too similar to Ek Tha Tiger (2012). The film's soundtrack was composed by Shantanu Moitra, Ajay–Atul and Ankit Tiwari with lyrics written by Swanand Kirkire, Amitabh Varma and Manoj Muntashir. UTV Motion Pictures acquired the distribution rights of the film. PK was the first Bollywood film to be shot in Belgium.

PK was released on 19 December 2014. Upon release, it received critical acclaim, with praise directed towards Khan's performance and the film's humour. The film received 8 nominations at the 60th Filmfare Awards, including Best Actor for Khan, Best Film, and Best Director for Hirani, winning two. Additionally, it won five Producers Guild Film Awards, and two Screen Awards. PK garnered the Telstra People's Choice Award at the Indian Film Festival of Melbourne. Produced on a budget of ₹1.22 billion, PK was the first Indian film to gross more than ₹7 billion and US$100 million worldwide. At the time of its release, it emerged as the highest-grossing Indian film of all time. The film's final worldwide gross was ₹769.89 crore (US$118.92 million). It currently ranks as the eleventh highest-grossing Hindi film of all-time.

== Plot ==
A humanoid alien lands in Rajasthan, India, on a research mission but is stranded when a thief steals his spaceship's remote-control amulet. Meanwhile, in Bruges, Belgium, Indian journalism student Jagat "Jaggu" Janani Sahni falls in love with Pakistani student Sarfaraz Yousuf. Her devout father, a follower of fraudulent Hindu godman Tapasvi Maharaj, opposes their interfaith relationship. After Tapasvi predicts Sarfaraz will betray her, Jaggu proposes an immediate registry marriage. At the chapel, however, she receives an unsigned letter calling off the wedding and returns to India heartbroken.

Now a television journalist in Delhi, Jaggu encounters the stranded alien, who distributes pamphlets seeking a "missing" God. After witnessing his arrest for attempting to recover money from a temple donation box as compensation for "broken promises", she secures his release. The alien explains that he survived by stealing clothes from couples, befriended Rajasthani brass bandmaster Bhairon Singh, and learned fluent Bhojpuri by absorbing memories through touch. His attempts to recover the amulet from various places of worship earned him the nickname "PK" (meaning "drunk").

PK explores Hinduism, Sikhism, Christianity, and Islam after being told only God can find his device, but none helps. He eventually discovers that Tapasvi possesses the amulet and falsely presents it as a divine relic from the Himalayas. After confirming PK's extraterrestrial nature, Jaggu agrees to help him retrieve it through her media platform.

PK concludes that religious intermediaries are effectively using a metaphorical "wrong number" to mislead humanity through fabricated dogmas and rituals. His campaign, supported by Jaggu's television network, becomes a nationwide movement exposing religious exploitation and threatening Tapasvi's influence. Meanwhile, Bhairon locates the thief, who admits selling the amulet to Tapasvi, but both are killed in a retaliatory terrorist bombing before they can testify.

Tapasvi challenges PK to a live televised debate. He cites his prediction of Sarfaraz's betrayal as proof of his foresight, but PK, having absorbed Jaggu's memories, recognises inconsistencies in the chapel incident. He deduces that the unsigned letter was delivered to the wrong pew and intended for another bride. Jaggu contacts the Pakistani Embassy in Belgium, which confirms that Sarfaraz found the same letter elsewhere and mistakenly believed Jaggu had rejected him. The broadcast exposes Tapasvi's deception, prompting Jaggu's disillusioned father to demand the remote control's return.

PK retrieves the device and prepares to leave Earth. Although he has fallen in love with Jaggu, he suppresses his feelings out of respect for her relationship with Sarfaraz, keeping recordings of her voice as a memento. Jaggu discovers his love notes but lets him leave, later publishing a bestselling book about his experiences.

One year later, PK returns to Earth with a new expedition from his species to continue studying human nature.

== Cast ==
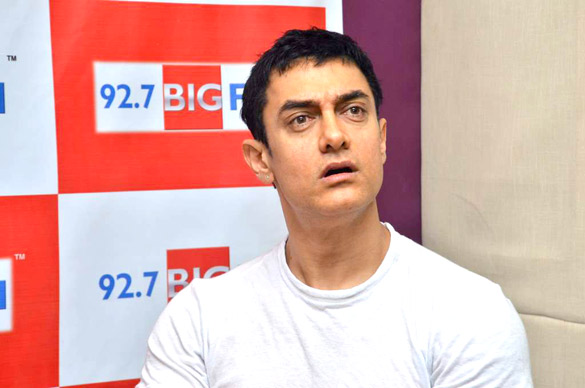
Aamir Khan at the Radio Station 92.7's studio in Mumbai

- Aamir Khan as PK; a humanoid alien
- Anushka Sharma as Jagat Janini "Jaggu" Sahni; a journalist and Sarfaraz's girlfriend and later his wife
- Sushant Singh Rajput as Sarfaraz Yousuf; Jaggu's boyfriend and later her husband
- Boman Irani as Cherry Bajwa; Jaggu's employer
- Saurabh Shukla as Tapasvi Maharaj; a self-proclaimed godman
- Sanjay Dutt as Bhairon “Bhaia” Singh; a bandmaster in Rajasthan and PK's friend
- Parikshit Sahni as Jayprakash Sahni; Jaggu's father
- Amardeep Jha as Mrs. Sahni; Jaggu's mother
- Ram Sethi as the old man in Belgium who tricked Sarfaraz and Jaggu
- Rajinder Sharma Nanu as the thief who stole PK's remote
- Sai Gundewar as the Ticket Seller of the Bachchan show in Belgium
- Rohitashv Gour as Mr. Pandey; a police constable
- Reema Debnath as Phuljhadiya; a prostitute
- Sachin Parikh as Tapasvi's manager
- Arun Bali as the old Sikh man in a restaurant
- Kamlesh Gill as the old woman in a restaurant
- Michael Pekala as Bystander in the train station
- Rukhsaar Rehman as the Receptionist at Pakistani Embassy in Belgium
- Plabita Borthakur as Jaggu's younger sister
- Anil Mange as a man dressed as Lord Shiva
- Brijendra Kala as an idol seller at a Delhi temple
- Alok Pandey as a reporter
- Rajeev Gupta as a police inspector
- Monali Thakur as a Kashmiri girl
- Maanvi Gagroo as Meetu Singh; Jaggu's colleague
- Shaji Choudhary as Tapasvi's bodyguard
- Hetal Puniwala as a maternity hospital doctor
- Vijay Crishna as an entrepreneur at the interview
- Ranbir Kapoor in a cameo appearance as a fellow alien from PK's home planet

== Production ==
=== Development ===
"PK" was the only film which began with a desire to say something. I can't say what that thing is. The battle was the other way round—how do you say such a serious thing in an entertaining way? For many years, we were struggling, until we finally found a way, where it will be entertaining, won't be offensive—will hit the right notes, basically.

— Rajkumar Hirani, director of pk, in an interview to India Insight.

After the success of 3 Idiots, director Rajkumar Hirani and writer Abhijat Joshi started work for their next project. They had written a story about a character who had the ability to get into another person's mind to make that person a better human being. They spent one year to write a story, but it turned out to be similar to Inception (2010). After watching Inception, Hirani and Joshi were shocked by the similarities. Eventually, they decided to scrap the film, then Hirani and Joshi reworked on the script, changing the entire tone and angle. It took three years to write it.

In PK, Khan played nine avatars (costume changes) and, during the course of the film, the actor had to chew over 10,000 betelnut preparations called paan. Betelnut is a psychoactive stimulant used throughout Asia and characterised by its ability to stain users' mouths red. "In real life paan is not a habit, I have it once in a while but for this film I chew paan for every scene. I would at times eat about 100 paans in a day. We had a paanwala [a paan maker] on the sets," said Khan in the report. For every take, Khan had to eat a fresh paan to fill his mouth. Before beginning the shoot, he would eat at least 10–15 paans to get the right color inside his mouth and on his lips.

Viral Thakkar was the visual effects supervisor. The visual effects company was Riva Digital at a point employing 100 artists working on the film.

=== Casting ===
In 2011, Aamir Khan and Anushka Sharma signed on for the film. Khan's nephew Imran Khan and Ranbir Kapoor were considered for a role which eventually went to Sushant Singh Rajput before the release of his debut movie Kai Po Che (2013). Earlier reports said that Rajkumar Hirani had signed Arshad Warsi for the film when it was reported that Arshad will be playing an important role. In 2013, Warsi said in an interview "I couldn't have worked out on dates. I wouldn't refuse Raju for anything. In fact, when he offered me the film, I did not even ask for the script, I was like I am ready to come on whenever you want. So that is the connection I share with Raju." Before Rajput and Warsi were signed on, R. Madhavan and Sharman Joshi were said to be cast in the film. Junaid Khan, son of Aamir Khan worked as an assistant director in this film.

=== Characters ===
- PK: The titular character was written to be a Chaplinesque, bumbling alien and meant to provide an outside view to the quirks and hypocrisies of the Indian society. To further accentuate the alien look, Khan developed a distinct appearance and mannerisms including wearing green contact lenses and not blinking while talking. Khan learned Bhojpuri for the role with the help of the language expert Shanti Bhushan. Rajkumar Hirani said in an interview, "When we write a script we usually visualize the characters in the film. How they look, talk and walk. But PK is one such character which was very difficult to visualize. We didn't have a reference point. PK was one such character, who didn't have a reference point. A character like him wasn't there in any book, nor did we meet someone like him in real life. We only knew that we wanted the character to be innocent and child-like. Now the question was, who is that actor who could look like a child. Someone who is perfect for the role of PK. The answer was obvious – Aamir Khan."
- Jagat "Jaggu" Janani: PK's friend and confidante, Jaggu is a television news reporter and is instrumental in spreading PK's message. She was envisioned as a fun-loving yet mature and independent woman. The producers wanted a distinct look for Jaggu and ended up trying several options over a few days before settling on one. Sharma said in an interview "Raju Sir wanted me to look happy, chirpy and peppy in PK. Keeping his brief in mind, the team came up with this look." She revealed that she was not required to cut her hair by remarking, "I have long hair, so hair stylists just wrapped my hair and tucked inside the wig".
- Bhairon Singh: Makers wanted somebody tall and sturdy for the role of Bhairon Singh and that's why Sanjay came in the picture. Vidhu Vinod Chopra shared, "The character Bhairon Singh is shown to be PK's good friend. The idea was that since PK is a tiny person, we wanted someone who in contrast is very huge. Such that, when Bhairon hugs PK, it looks funny as the tiny man would go completely unnoticed in Bhairon's arms."

=== Title ===
In 2011, in its initial scripting stage, Hirani named the film Talli, then changed it to Ek Tha Talli which he loved, but later on came to know that Ek Tha Tiger was already in production (released in 2012). He dropped the idea and, after many titles, he came up with a title that only had initials, PK. After starting the film, Hirani felt PK was not a good enough title. He decided to change the title to Talli. But after a few weeks of shooting, Hirani decided to go back to the original title.

=== Themes ===
Firstpost compared PK to Hirani and Khan's previous collaboration 3 Idiots, as they both involve "A socially awkward and 'different' young man—who walks and talks in a strange, enthusiastic childlike manner—observes the system, questions it, asks you to look at the many ludicrous things that inform it, and eventually brings about a minor revolution." In an interview, Rajkumar Hirani revealed that initially, the plot involved the alien protagonist falling in love with a girl early on, which led him to question religious divisions when he encountered her father’s prejudice. He used his powers to change the father's mindset. However, after watching Inception, Hirani realised the concept was too similar and scrapped the original second half. The filmmakers also decided against a storyline involving a case against God, as it closely resembled the play Kanji Viruddh Kanji, which was being adapted into a film (OMG Oh My God) written by Joshi's playwright brother Saumya. Ultimately, PK focused on promoting communal harmony, with both films exploring similar themes but through different approaches.

=== Filming ===
According to Hirani, PK is a "satire on Hindu gods and their godmen". The co-director Khan began looking for shooting locations in July 2012. Second unit filming was set to begin in late 2012, which was stalled after the rumoured departure of three department heads for the film and bad weather stalling initial shoots. Hirani denied rumours that the film would be delayed, stating that principal filming had always been intended to begin in mid-January 2013 in Delhi and Rajasthan to "capture the winter of Delhi".

Shooting officially began on 1 February 2013, with the filming scheduled to occur over a 45-day period. A one-week schedule of shooting of PK was in June 2013 in Bruges, Belgium. A 26-day schedule of shooting of PK started in Delhi from 27 September 2013.

== Marketing ==
The film was marketed by a Mumbai Based company named Spice PR owned by Prabhat Choudhary.

The makers released a teaser trailer on 23 October 2014. It achieved 3.4 million views on YouTube within five days, subsequently receiving 12 million views. It was regarded as the most viewed movie trailers on YouTube. The teaser was attached with the film Happy New Year (2014).

In August, the makers found a new promotional strategy to interact with the audiences by introducing talking standees. This was the first time a Bollywood film used a talking standee at varied locations as a part of its promotions. The standee had Khan talking to people in a prominent places in popular theatres and multiplexes.

On 7 December 2014, Khan began the city tour for promotions with Patna. The character he plays speaks in Bhojpuri which is the main language used for communication in Bihar. Aamir said at the event "I have decided to launch the promotional campaign of my film PK from Bihar to connect with the language. My character speaks Bhojpuri in the film." Hence, the actor decided to start his promotional schedule from Bihar. Although he wanted to visit Bhojpur, which is 60 kilometres from Bihar, he could not because of security issues. In Bihar he visited a litti chokha stall. The visit resulted in a surge of customers to the shop, and the shop owner put up pictures of Khan eating the local delicacy. Then the crew proceeded to Varanasi where they had a screening of their film 3 Idiots and interacted with the people. Khan made an impromptu visit to Krishana Paan shop to savour a Banarasi pan. The actor specially removed time from his schedule to visit this place. He enjoyed a "mitha banarasi paan" there. After the crew visited Delhi, Ahemdabad, Raipur, Jaipur, Hyderabad, Indore, Bangalore and other locations in India. Aamir and makers also promoted the film in Dubai.

=== PK: The Game ===
Indiagames, a part of Disney India's Interactive business, announced the launch of the official mobile game 'PK' based on the film. On 14 December 2014, Aamir Khan, Anushka Sharma, Rajkumar Hirani, Vidhu Vinod Chopra, Siddharth Roy Kapur, managing director of Disney India and Sameer Ganapathy, VP and head, Interactive of Disney India launched the game at the Reliance Digital Store in Juhu amidst much fanfare. The game was developed for both feature phones and smartphones. It was launched on Google Play, iOS App Store and Windows platform. In the game, the player gets to don many avatars of Aamir Khan as seen in the movie, along with a special avatar of Anushka Sharma, as he embarks upon an exciting endless running adventure. Set against an Indian background, the gamer runs amidst the by-lanes of Delhi, railway tracks in a desert (as seen in the movie), and collect a maximum number of paans (as PK is seen enjoying eating paan in the movie). The gamer has to avoid a number of obstacles on the way, which include cows, buses, Delhi trains, rickshaws, traffic jams, and more. The backdrops in the game give the player the feel of the movie.

== Release ==
PK was earlier scheduled to release on 6 June 2014. The director (who is also editor of the film), Rajkumar Hirani, wanted to spend more time editing. Besides, some portions with Sanjay Dutt were yet to be shot. Also, the second season of Satyamev Jayate was to kick off from March. So Aamir Khan was not sure if he would be able to promote PK in June. Hence the makers settled for a December release.

PK was released on 19 December 2014, as the 200th Bollywood release in 2014. The release was later expanded to 6000 screens worldwide, which included 5200 screens in India and 844 screens overseas.

PK was initially released in 4844 screens worldwide. PK has been made tax-free in Uttar Pradesh and Bihar. PK is the widest Indian movie released in the UK (198 screens), Pakistan (over 70 screens), Australia (35 screens) and outside of India (844 screens in over 40 overseas markets). PK was released theatrically in China on 22 May 2015 across 4,600 screens. It had a dubbed Mandarin Chinese version, with Wang Baoqiang voicing Khan's role. The film was released in South Korea and Hong Kong on 3 September 2015, and in Japan on 29 October 2016.

=== Distribution ===
The music rights were sold for ₹150 million (US$2.46 million). DNA reported, "Being the first film to use Rentrak, Khan has taken the first initiative to bring in a paradigm shift from the usual norms followed in Bollywood. He had clearly enforced the idea of Rentrak to be brought in to bring more accuracy when it comes to box office figures."

== Soundtrack ==
The soundtrack is composed by Shantanu Moitra, Ajay–Atul and Ankit Tiwari with lyrics written by Swanand Kirkire, Amitabh Varma and Manoj Muntashir. The song "Tharki Chokro" is the first single, released on 24 October 2014. The video focuses on Aamir Khan and Sanjay Dutt, with the song sung by Swaroop Khan and composed by Ajay–Atul with lyrics penned by Swanand Kirkire. The second single, "Love Is a Waste of Time", which pictured Aamir Khan and Anushka Sharma, was released on 31 October 2014 on YouTube. The song is sung by Sonu Nigam and Shreya Ghoshal, composed by Shantanu Moitra with the lyrics of Amitabh Varma. "Chaar Kadam" was released on 2 November 2014 on the T-Series YouTube. The song is sung by Shaan and Shreya Ghoshal, composed by Shantanu Moitra with lyrics by Swanand Kirkire. The full soundtrack was released on 5 November 2014.

== Reception ==
Srijana Mitra Das of The Times of India gave the movie 4 stars out of 5. Rajeev Masand of CNN-IBN gave 3.5 stars quoting "It's a courageous film that sticks to Hirani's well-oiled formula". NDTV gave 5 stars calling it "PK is a winner all the way, a film that Raj Kapoor, Bimal Roy and Guru Dutt would have been proud of had they been alive. Hirani is without a doubt their most worthy standard-bearer." Bollywood Hungama described it as "a solid entertainer that will surely entertain the masses and classes alike" and gave 4.5 out of 5 stars. Raja Sen of Rediff.com gave PK 4 out of 5 stars and called it "a triumph" and argued that Khan "soars high". However, Sukanya Verma of the same publication called the film "a mixed bag of spunk and sentimentality", while still giving it 3.5 out of 5 stars. Rohit Vats of Hindustan Times gave 4 out of 5 stars and said "Khan steals the show with his performance". Rohit Khilnani of India Today gave 4.5 stars, and said "Go watch the film & watch it ASAP!" Edmund Lee of South China Morning Post gave PK 3.5 stars. In Japan, Yuri Wakabayashi of Eiga gave the film a positive review in 2016.

In 2019, Film Companion ranked Khan's performance among the 100 best in Indian film for the past decade.

=== Box office ===
PK had its box office figures tracked by Rentrak, a United States–based company that specialises in audience measurements. PK became the first Bollywood film to earn ₹1 billion (US$16.39 million) net from online bookings. PK grossed ₹183.09 crore (US$28.955 million) worldwide in its first week. It became the highest-grossing Indian film, in both domestic as well as international markets. The film's final worldwide gross was ₹753.36 crore (US$118.92 million). It was the 71st highest-grossing film of 2014. PK was the first Indian film to gross more than ₹7 billion and US$100 million worldwide.

PK worldwide collections breakdown
Territories	Collections breakdown
India	₹448.74 (US$70,930,600)
Domestic gross	₹448.74 crore
Domestic net	₹340.8 crore
Distributor share	₹165 crore
Entertainment tax	₹107.94 crore
Overseas	US$47,988,400 (₹304.52 crore)
China	¥119 million—US$19,650,000 (₹124.83 crore)
United States and Canada	US$10,616,104 million (₹67.16 crore)
South Korea	US$296,315 (₹1.96 crore)
Arab states of the Persian Gulf	US$4,955,752 (₹31.35 crore)
United Kingdom	£2,386,569 (US$3,704,164)
Australia	A$2,108,655 (US$1,712,959)
Hong Kong	HK$6,732,481 (US869,591)
New Zealand	NZ$568,336 (US$443,482)
Taiwan	US$289,000 (₹1.86 crore)
Worldwide	₹769.89 crore (US$118,919,000)

=== Domestic ===
PK earned ₹266.3 million net on its opening day. It showed growth on its second day, earning around ₹303.4 million net. On its third day, the film brought in ₹384.4 million net, bringing its weekend take to ₹954.1 million net.

PK had the highest collections for a Hindi film on its first Monday, earning around ₹212.2 million net. Over the next two days it grossed ₹193.6 million and ₹195.5 million net respectively, taking its total to ₹1,555.4 million. On Christmas Day the film earned ₹275.5 million net, taking its first week total to ₹1.831 billion net.

On its second Friday, PK brought in around ₹144.8 million net. The film kept growing in its second weekend, earning ₹171.6 million on Saturday and ₹218.5 million on Sunday, taking the weekend total to ₹534.9 million net. It earned ₹100.8 million on its second Monday, ₹91.1 million on Tuesday and ₹90.5 million on Wednesday. With this, the film took its total to around ₹2,648.2 million net and became the highest-grossing film in India in just 13 days. The film set a record second week figure of ₹957.8 million, taking its total to ₹2,788.7 million net. PK made an all-time record in the Mumbai circuit by grossing there more than ₹1 billion net.

The film netted around ₹267.5 million in its third weekend, reaching ₹3.0562 billion net in seventeen days. PK went on to net ₹3.175 billion in India and grossed ₹1.53 billion overseas for a worldwide gross of ₹5.77 billion in three weeks. The film earned a final domestic gross of ₹448.74 crore (US$73.53 million), including a domestic net of ₹3.408 billion.

=== International ===
The film opened in 22 international markets during its opening weekend (19–21 December) and grossed $28.7 million, placing it at No. 3 at the worldwide box office behind The Hobbit: The Battle of the Five Armies and Gone with the Bullets. In North America, it set an opening weekend record for an Indian film collecting $3.75 million and placing at No. 10 at the box office. PK is the first Indian film to gross US$10 million in North America (US and Canada). The international gross was US$47.99 million (₹304.52 crore)—at the time, the highest-grossing Bollywood film of all time in international markets. In Pakistan, PK grossed Rs. 18 crore (US$640,000) as of 10 January 2015.

==== East Asia ====
PK had a second phase of overseas release in East Asia, most prominently in China. It became an instant hit, grossing US$5.14–5.3 million in first three days of release due to good word-of-mouth—a record for an Indian film (previously held by Dhoom 3), debuting at second place at the Chinese box office behind Avengers: Age of Ultron. PK became the highest-grossing Indian film in China in just 72 hours and grossed US$19.5 million (Rs 1.22 billion) in China. It became the first Indian film to pass the 100 million yuan ($16.11 million) threshold, which is considered rare for a non-Hollywood foreign film.

The film grossed ¥119 million (US$20 million) in China. In addition, it grossed US$0.3 million in South Korea, US$870,000 in Hong Kong, and US$289,000 in Taiwan. PK was also a hit in Japan when it was released there in 2016, particularly in Tokyo; in Shinjuku, for example, it was the year's second highest-earning film at Cinema Qualite.

=== Records ===
Box office records set by PK
Box office record	Record details	Previous record holder	Ref.
Number of screens (Domestic)	5,200 screens	Dhoom 3 (2013, 4,500 screens)	
Lifetime gross (India)	₹4.4874 billion	Dhoom 3 (2013, ₹3.72 billion)	
Lifetime net (India)	₹3.408 billion	Dhoom 3 (2013, ₹2.61 billion)	
Overseas gross	₹3.0452 billion	Dhoom 3 (2013, US$31 million)	
Worldwide gross	₹753.36 billion	Dhoom 3 (2013, ₹5.4 billion)	
Highest gross (North America)	US$10.616 million	Dhoom 3 (2013, $8,031,955)	
Highest gross (Australia)	A$2.11 million	Dhoom 3 (2013, A$1,752,845)	
Highest gross (New Zealand)	NZ$568,336	Dhoom 3 (2013, NZ$530,911)	
Highest gross (China)	¥119 million (US$20 million)	Dhoom 3 (2013, US$3.17 million)	
Highest gross in a single territory outside India	US$20 million (China); US$11 million (North America)	Dhoom 3 (2013, $8,031,955, North America)	

== Awards and nominations ==
Awards	Category	Recipients and nominees	Results
Apsara Film Producers Guild Awards	Best Film	Vidhu Vinod Chopra, Rajkumar Hirani	Won
Apsara Film Producers Guild Awards	Best Actor	Aamir Khan	Nominated
Apsara Film Producers Guild Awards	Best Actress	Anushka Sharma	Nominated
International Indian Film Academy Awards	Best Director	Rajkumar Hirani	Won
International Indian Film Academy Awards	Best Dialogue	Rajkumar Hirani, Abhijat Joshi	Won
International Indian Film Academy Awards	Best Actor	Aamir Khan	Nominated
International Indian Film Academy Awards	Best Actress	Anushka Sharma	Nominated
Bollywood Hungama Surfers' Choice Movie Awards	Best Film	PK	Won
Bollywood Hungama Surfers' Choice Movie Awards	Best Marketed Film	PK	Won
Bollywood Hungama Surfers' Choice Movie Awards	Best Director	Rajkumar Hirani	Won
Bollywood Hungama Surfers' Choice Movie Awards	Best Actor	Aamir Khan	Won
Bollywood Hungama Surfers' Choice Movie Awards	Best Supporting Actor	Sanjay Dutt	Nominated
Bollywood Hungama Surfers' Choice Movie Awards	Best Comedian	Boman Irani	Nominated
ETC Bollywood Business Awards	Highest-Grossing Film	PK	Won
Filmfare Awards	Best Screenplay	Abhijat Joshi, Rajkumar Hirani	Won
Filmfare Awards	Best Dialogue	Abhijat Joshi, Rajkumar Hirani	Won
Filmfare Awards	Best Story	Abhijat Joshi, Rajkumar Hirani	Nominated
Filmfare Awards	Best Film	Rajkumar Hirani, Vidhu Vinod Chopra	Nominated
Filmfare Awards	Best Director	Rajkumar Hirani	Nominated
Filmfare Awards	Best Editing	Rajkumar Hirani	Nominated
Filmfare Awards	Best Actor	Aamir Khan	Nominated
Filmfare Awards	Best Costume Design	Manoshi Nath, Rushi Sharma	Nominated
GQ Awards	Director of the Year	Rajkumar Hirani	Won
Screen Awards	Best Film	PK	Nominated
Screen Awards	Best Director	Rajkumar Hirani	Nominated
Screen Awards	Best Actor	Aamir Khan	Nominated
Screen Awards	Best Dialogue	Rajkumar Hirani, Abhijat Joshi	Won
Screen Awards	Best Costume Design	Manoshi Nath, Rushi Sharma	Won

== Sequel ==
Director Hirani has confirmed that a sequel will be made starring Khan and Ranbir Kapoor. He said, "We will make the sequel. We had shown Ranbir [Kapoor's character landing on the planet] towards the end of the film, so there is a story to tell. But Abhijat Joshi (the writer of the film) has not written it yet. The day he writes it, we will make it."

== Controversies ==
When the shoot was going on in Chandni Chowk area of Delhi, an FIR was lodged against the makers of the film for allegedly hurting religious sentiments in October 2013. The objection was regarding a scene where a man dressed as the Hindu deity Shiva, pulls the rickshaw with two burqa clad women as passengers.

In July 2014, the film's poster sparked a controversy as it featured Aamir Khan posing almost nude with only a radio cassette recorder covering his genitals. Although the Central Board of Film Certification had cleared the film, a PIL was filed in the court by the All India Human Rights and Social Justice Front to ban its release saying it promoted nudity and vulgarity. The Supreme Court of India dismissed the plea and gave the film a green signal. A case was lodged against Aamir Khan and Rajkumar Hirani under section 295A in Rajasthan.

Activists of pro-Hindu organisations Vishwa Hindu Parishad and Bajrang Dal protested against certain scenes in the film, which they considered to be hurtful to the religious sentiments of the Hindu community as it showed Aamir Khan running behind Shiva. Subsequently, some theatres were vandalised by those activists, who demanded a ban on the movie and a Public Interest Litigation was filed against PK for the same. Amish Tripathi of Hindustan Times and Madhu Kishwar of Firstpost took issue with the film for mocking idolatry.

Swaroopanand Saraswati in January 2015 raised questions with the Censor Board about the film, demanding that the CBI investigate how the film received its certification from the Censor Board despite several members of the Board requesting that the film be reviewed again, but with no action taken.

The Sunni clerics of the All India Muslim Personal Law Board demanded the removal of some scenes of the movie which they believed were hurting religious sentiments.

Government officials, such as the Uttar Pradesh chief minister Akhilesh Yadav and the then–chief minister of Bihar Jitan Ram Manjhi, exempted the film from entertainment tax to encourage wider viewership.

== See also ==
- List of highest-grossing Indian films
- List of films featuring extraterrestrials
