= List of people from Hyderabad =

This is a list of notable people from Hyderabad, the capital of Telangana State of India. A person from Hyderabad is called a Hyderabadi. People born in Hyderabad, of Hyderabadi descent, or those who have spent a large part of their career in Hyderabad are included.

== Academics ==
- Rafi Ahmed, Indo-American virologist and immunologist
- Saleh Muhammad Alladin, astronomer
- Muhammad Hamidullah
- Zakir Hussain
- Ali Yavar Jung, former vice chancellor of Osmania University and Aligarh University
- Mohammed Vizarat Rasool Khan, founder of Shadan Group of Institutions
- Yousuf Hussain Khan, pro-vice-chancellor, Aligarh University
- Mangala Mani, ISRO scientist

== Advocates ==
- J. Sai Deepak
- Menaka Guruswamy
- Cara Elizabeth Yar Khan

== Cinema, music and visual arts ==
- Mast Ali, actor
- Rashid Ali, singer
- Ali Asgar, actor and comedian
- Talat Aziz (1956–), ghazal singer
- Mohammad Ali Baig, producer-director, head of the Hyderabad-based Qadir Ali Baig Theatre Foundation
- Shyam Benegal (1934–), director and screenwriter
- Naga Chaitanya, actor
- Sreerama Chandra, singer
- Sherlyn Chopra (1984–), model, actor, singer
- Rana Daggubati (1984–), actor, producer
- Anand Deverakonda, actor
- Vijay Deverakonda, actor
- Gifton Elias (1987–), composer, conductor
- Farah (1968–), Bollywood actor
- Diana Hayden (1973–), Miss World
- Vedala Hemachandra, singer
- Aditi Rao Hydari, actress
- Hyderabad Brothers (D. Raghavachari and D. Seshachari), carnatic music duo
- Mohammed Irfan, playback singer
- N. C. Karunya (1986–), singer
- Ajit Khan (1922–98), actor, filmmaker
- Ateeq Hussain Khan (1980–), qawwali, musician
- Kabir Khan, film director
- Razak Khan (1958–2016), actor, comedian, director
- Rohit Khandelwal (1989–), actor, Mr. World
- Anjali Parvati Koda, playwright, stand-up comedian
- Nagesh Kukunoor (1967–), filmmaker, screenwriter
- Gopichand Lagadapati, actor, writer, director, producer
- Tejaswi Madivada, model
- Vennu Mallesh, singer
- Anwar Maqsood, Pakistani actor, playwright, lyricist, satirist
- Asmita Marwa, fashion designer
- Dia Mirza (1981–), model, actor, Miss Asia Pacific International
- Aziz Naser (1980–), actor
- Nani, Telugu Actor
- Vivek Oberoi, Actor
- Shashi Preetam (1970–), music director
- Priyadarshi Pulikonda, actor
- Bairu Raghuram (1949–), painter
- Radhika Rao (1976–), writer, director, filmmaker
- Vithal Rao (1929–2015), ghazal singer
- Rathna Shekar Reddy (1908–), theatre and film actor, founder of Samahaara
- Rishikanth, actor
- Payal Rohatgi (1980 or 1984–), actor
- Sushmita Sen (1975–), actor, Miss Universe
- Mani Shankar (1957–), filmmaker
- Tabu, actress
- Manasa Varanasi, Miss India World 2021
- Vinay Varma, theatre, film and voice actor, scriptwriter, casting director, founder of Sutradhar
- Warsi Brothers, qawwali group

== Business ==
- Fazal Nawaz Jung (c. 1894–1964), financier and politician
- Ravi Kailas, businessman
- Mehboob Alam Khan, restaurateur
- Shah Alam Khan (1921–2017)
- Prem Watsa, CEO of Fairfax Financial Holdings (1950–present)

== Civil servants and diplomats ==
- Syed Akbaruddin
- Abid Hussain (1926–2012), diplomat
- Idris Hasan Latif, former Indian ambassador to France
- Ausaf Sayeed, diplomat, former ambassador of India to Saudi Arabia and Yemen

== Information technology ==
- Satya Nadella, CEO of Microsoft Corporation
- Shantanu Narayen, CEO and president of Adobe Systems

== Literature ==
- Indira Devi Dhanrajgir (1929–), poet
- Amjad Hyderabadi (1878–1961), Urdu poet
- Khamakha Hyderabadi (1929–2017), poet and writer
- Jwalamukhi (1938 – 2008), poet, novelist, essayist and political activist
- Sarojini Naidu (1879 – 1949), poet and political activist
- Jameela Nishat (1955), Urdu poet, feminist and social activist
- Maharaja Sir Kishen Pershad (pen name: Shad) (1864–1940), scholar of Urdu, Arabic and Persian
- Sayyid Ahmedullah Qadri (1909–1985), poet, journalist, writer, translator, literary critic, educationist and politician
- Sayyid Shamsullah Qadri (1885–1953), historian
- Ali Haider Tabatabai or Syed Ali Hyder Nazm Tabatabai (1854–1933), poet and translator
- Naseer Turabi (1945–2021), Urdu poet
- Mohiuddin Qadri Zore (1905–1962), poet, literary critic and historian

== Media and television ==
- Baseer Ali, reality TV star
- Harsha Bhogle, cricket commentator and journalist
- Rajiv Chilaka, creator and director of animated TV and film
- Anees Jung (b. 1944), author and journalist

== Military ==
- S. M. Ahsan (1910-1989), fourth commander-in-chief of the Pakistan Navy from 1966 to 1969, Distinguished Service Cross recipient
- Mateen Ansari (1916–1943), George Cross recipient
- Syed Ahmed El Edroos (1899–1962), veteran of both World Wars; last commander-in-chief of the Hyderabad State Army
- Idris Hasan Latif (1923–2018), former chief of Air Staff of the Indian Air Force
- Mohammad Ahmed Zaki, former lieutenant general and Vir Chakra recipient

== Sports ==
=== Badminton ===
- Pullela Gopichand, All England badminton winner; coach of Indian badminton team
- Jwala Gutta, doubles player, quarterfinalist in 2012 Olympics
- Parupalli Kashyap, Olympian, won gold medal at 2014 Commonwealth Games
- Srikanth Kidambi, Indonesia open winner
- Shruti Kurien, former doubles player
- Saina Nehwal, former world no. 1
- Ashwini Ponnappa, 2011 world badminton championship bronze medalist
- B. Sai Praneeth, Swiss grand prix open 2018
- P. V. Sindhu, won a silver medal at 2016 Rio Olympics

=== Cricket ===
- Ghulam Ahmed, test player
- Syed Abid Ali, former cricketer
- Arshad Ayub (1987–1990)
- Mohammad Azharuddin, former captain of Indian Cricket Team
- Abbas Ali Baig
- Noel David, former cricketer
- Syed Mohammad Hadi, nicknamed Indian Rainbow Hadi
- M. L. Jaisimha, known as 'cultivated stylist' in cricket team
- V. V. S. Laxman, former Indian cricketer
- C. K. Nayudu (1895–1967), first captain of the Indian test cricket team
- Pragyan Ojha, former Indian cricketer
- Mithali Raj, Indian cricket team captain
- Venkatapathy Raju, former Indian cricketer
- Ambati Rayudu, Indian professional cricket player
- Mohammed Siraj, Indian cricketer
- Gouher Sultana, Indian cricketer
- Shivlal Yadav (1979–1987), former Indian cricketer

=== Football ===
- Shabbir Ali
- Yousuf Khan
- Syed Nayeemuddin, former captain of the Indian football team
- Syed Abdul Rahim, former India national football coach

=== Hockey ===
- Mukesh Kumar, former Indian hockey player

=== Tennis ===
- Syed Mohammad Hadi
- Sania Mirza

=== Bodybuilding ===
- Mir Mohtesham Ali Khan, Mr. World 2007 (silver)
- Esa Misri
- Osman Misri

=== Others ===
- Abdul Basith, volleyball
- Naina Ashwin Kumar, table tennis
- Rahul Srivatshav Peddi, chess grandmaster

== Politics ==
- Ghazala Hashmi, politician
- Zakir Husain (1897–1969), 3rd president of India
- Mohammad Majid Hussain, former mayor of Hyderabad
- Amanullah Khan, politician
- Mohammed Vizarat Rasool Khan, former MLA
- Idris Hasan Latif (1923–2018), former governor of Maharashtra
- Aruna Miller, politician
- Danam Nagender, former MLA and Minister of Labour
- Akbaruddin Owaisi, MLA, present MLA and Managing Director of Owaisi Hospital
- Asaduddin Owaisi, MP, present MP of Hyderabad and chairman of Dar-us-salaam Trust
- Sultan Salahuddin Owaisi, former MLA and president of AIMIM
- Syed Ahmed Pasha Quadri, MLA and general secretary of AIMIM
- G. Sanjeeva Reddy, president INTUC, former MP and Minister of Labour
- Kiran Kumar Reddy, former Chief Minister of Andhra Pradesh
- Mohammed Ali Shabbir, politician
- T. Raja Singh, popular Hindu leader

== Recipients of national awards ==
=== Bharat Ratna ===
- Zakir Husain, former president of India
- P. V. Narasimha Rao, former prime minister of India

=== Padma Vibhushan ===
- Zakir Husain, former president of India
- Ali Yavar Jung, former governor of Maharashtra

=== Padma Bhushan ===
- Abid Hussain, diplomat
- Yousuf Hussain, educationist
- Ali Yavar Jung, former governor of Maharashtra
- Sania Mirza, tennis player
- Saina Nehwal, badminton player

=== Padma Shri ===
- Mohammad Azharuddin
- Mohan Babu, film actor and producer
- Mohammad Ali Baig, theatre activist
- Mujtaba Hussain
- Bilkees Latif, social worker
- Sayyid Ahmedullah Qadri, poet, journalist, writer, translator, literary critic, educationist and politician
- Shantha Sinha, anti-child labour activist
- Mohammad Ahmed Zaki, former lieutenant general

== Nizams of Hyderabad ==
- Qamar-ud-din Khan, Asif Jah I
- Nizam Ali Khan, Asaf Jah II
- Mir Akbar Ali Khan, Asaf Jah III
- Nasir-ud-dawlah, Asaf Jah IV
- Afzal ad-Dawlah, Asaf Jah V
- Mahbub Ali Khan, Asaf Jah VI
- Osman Ali Khan, Asaf Jah VII

== See also ==
- List of notable Hyderabadi Muslims
