= Raktham – The Blood =

- Directed by: Rajesh Touchriver
- Written by: Narasimha Kumar
- Screenplay by: Rajesh Touchriver
- Story by: Rajesh Touchriver
- Based on: The Just Assassins by Albert Camus
- Produced by: Sunitha Krishnan
- Starring: Maganti Banarjee; Madhu Shalini; Lennon Gopin; Rayala Harischandra; John Kottoly; Sanju Sivram
- Cinematography: J. D. Rama Thulasi
- Edited by: K. Sasi Kumar
- Music by: V. K. Vivek
- Production company: Sun Touch Productions
- Release date: 25 December 2019
- Country: India
- Language: Telugu

Raktham – The Blood is a 2019 Indian Telugu language political thriller film, written, and directed by Rajesh Touchriver, starring Maganti Banarjee, Madhu Shalini, and Sanju Sivaram in pivotal roles. Upon release, the film was featured at the All Lights India International Film Festival.

== Premise ==
Raktham is inspired by Albert Camus's 1949 Play, The Just Assassins. Raktham explores Indian guerrillas, and Naxalite–Maoist insurgency in the interiors of Andhra Pradesh and Telangana.

== Cast ==
- Maganti Banarjee
- Madhu Shalini as a maoist
- Lennon Gopin
- Rayala Harischandra
- John Kottoly
- Sanju Sivram as Anand
