= Pani Pani Re =

- Directed by: Tawseef Quazi
- Written by: Tawseef Quazi
- Produced by: Tajalli Productions
- Release date: 19 May 2016
- Running time: 14 minutes
- Country: India
- Language: Hindi-Deccani

Pani Pani Re is a 2016 Hindi-Deccani satire short film produced by Tajalli Productions, written and directed by debutant director Tawseef Quazi. It shows the plight the world would be in, if water isn't conserved. The short film originally released on 19 May 2016, was screened at Lamakaan, Hyderabad. The short is 14 minutes long.

== Plot ==
The story revolves around the family of Nawab Haroon Ali Khan, a rich Nawab who is struggling to find water for his daughter's marriage.

== Cast ==
- Mayanand Thakur as Nawab Haroon Ali Khan
- Kabeer as Khan Sahab
- Rajnish Songara as Rashed
- Iqbal Razvi as Rashed's Uncle
- Niteesh Malang as Poor man
- Akhilesh Washikar as Jafar
- Ali Ahmed as Rashed's Friend
- Vinay as Nawab's Manager
