= Geoffrey Lyons (disambiguation) =

Geoffrey Lyons is a politician.

Geoffrey Lyons may also refer to:

- Geoffrey Lyons, High Sheriff of King's County in 1693
- Geoffrey Lyons, character in The Hound of the Baskervilles (1983 film)
- Jeffrey S. Lyons (1939 or 1940–2015), Toronto lawyer, lobbyist, and community activist.
- Jeffrey Lyons (1944), American television and film critic
- Tahir Faridi Qawwal, leader of Canadian-American Qawwali band Fanna-Fi-Allah, who changed his name from Geoffrey Lyons upon converting to Islam
