= Mehboob Alam Khan =

Indian food connoisseur

- Born: Mehboob Alam Khan; Hyderabad, India

Nawab Mehboob Alam Khan is an Indian food connoisseur and culinary expert of Hyderabadi cuisine. He has restored many lost recipes of the Hyderabadi tradition.

== Early life ==
Mehboob Alam Khan was born in Hyderabad in a noble family. He did his schooling at St. George's Grammar School. His father, Shah Alam Khan, was the son in law of the founder of the Hyderabad Deccan Cigarette Factory, as well as an educationist eminent personality of Hyderabad.

== Career ==
Mehboob Alam Khan's family owns Hyderabad Deccan Cigarette Factory in Hyderabad. He is the director of Anwar-uloom educational society.

=== Culinary interests ===
Mehboob Alam Khan researched on the Hyderabadi cuisine for many years. He works as a consultant for Taj Group of Hotels. He also works with the government for their state dinners, and he is the stake holder in Taj holdings.

He also has a chain of restaurants, which serves authentic Hyderabadi food. His nephew, Qutub Alam Khan, owns Chicha's, another Hyderabadi restaurant at Lakdi ka pul.

=== MAY 2026 Controversy and Arrest ===
Nawab Mahboob Alam Khan and his son, former Telangana Congress vice-president Mujahid Alam Khan, were arrested by the Hyderabad City Police for their alleged roles as main planners in the high-profile contract killing of senior advocate and Waqf Board activist Khaja Moizuddin.The case, which was initially reported as a tragic hit-and-run, unfolded into a meticulously planned criminal conspiracy.
