= Rathna Shekar Reddy =

Indian actor

- Born: 21 October 1980 (age 45); Hyderabad, Andhra Pradesh, India
- Occupations: Dramatist; Actor; Director
- Years active: 2004–present

Rathna Shekar Reddy is an Indian actor. He is the co-founder of the prominent Hyderabad-based theatre group Samahaara, along with writer-director Anjali Parvati Koda. He starred in Telugu films such as the National Award-winning Telugu film, Naa Bangaaru Talli (Ente in Malayalam).

== Career ==
Reddy is a Hyderabadi theatre and Telugu film actor and an alumnus of the Lee Strasberg Theatre and Film Institute. He is best known for his critically acclaimed theatre productions like Purushotham, Dominic Wesley, Last Wish Baby, Gregor Samsa and others, and his work in movies like Ishq (Telugu) and Ente (Malayalam). His body of work includes The Imaginary Invalid, Fiddler on the Roof, Purushotham, Wait Until Dark, and The Last Wish Baby.

Reddy conducts theatre workshops, produces and directs plays for both Samahaara and outside institutions like schools, colleges, corporations and others. His movies include Mana Kuralle, in which he plays a negative lead, Antha Scene Ledu, lead in the award-winning Naa Bangaaru Thalli, Yuddham Sharanam and others. His TV show Wow Emi Ruchi, for which he was the host for more than a 100 episodes, gained him tremendous popularity on the small screen.

=== Samahaara ===
Rathna Shekar began with touring their maiden production The Crest of the Peacock, an educational play on mathematics across the twin cities to schools and colleges, staging more than 50 shows. Their plays, Purushotham-He, the Victim of Spiders and Pressure Cookers have gotten critical acclaim. They have worked on many productions since including another original play, Dominic Wesley, written by Koda, directed by UK-based Stu Denison, Unlucky (based on Samuel Beckett's plays) also directed by Denison, Rabindranath Tagore's Post Office, Woody Allen's God, Athol Fugard's The Island and many workshop productions.

The group Samahaara under the guidance of Rathna Shekar Reddy is credited with making theatre popular and involving the young crowd in Hyderabad. Their most significant contribution to the Theatre of India, apart from their original productions, has been organizing four editions of The Hyderabad Theatre Festival, namely The Hyderabad Theatre Festival 2009, The Hyderabad Theatre and Short-Film Festival 2010. the Samahaara Hyderabad Theatre and Rock Music Festival 2011, and the Hyderabad Theatre Festival 2012. The festival has been instrumental in bringing together the various amateur and professional theatre groups in Hyderabad and improving the quality and scale of the plays. The platform of HTF as it is abbreviated has been a great boost for theatre groups in Hyderabad.

Many of Samahaara's stand-alone productions are performed at various auditoriums across the city, including the open-cultural center Lamakaan, the iconic Ravindra Bharathi, Telugu University and Bharatiya Vidya Bhavan. HTF 2009 was held in June 2009 at Bharatiya Vidya Bhavan, HTF 2010 was conducted at Ravindra Bharathi in July 2010 for 7 days, and HTF 2011 was conducted in December 2011 at three venues: Bharatiya Vidya Bhavan, Ravindra Bharathi and Taramati Baradari.

Another project, the Samahaara Theatre Cooperative, involves selecting a group of actors, providing them with training, and offering opportunities to perform on stage over the course of a year.

With his performances and mentorship, he has touched hearts throughout the city and can be cited as largely responsible for the increasing interest in theatre in Hyderabad visible in the last few years. Youngsters in Hyderabad are now able to find a mentor to learn from, and Reddy has created a platform for them to develop and display their talent. Other theatre groups in the city have recognized the contribution of Samahaara and Rathna Shekar by crediting a surge in audience interest to him and to Samahaara's annual Hyderabad Theatre Festival. Also the continued efforts in educating and training people in theatre has seen a dramatic rise in interest from the audience.

=== Theatre workshops ===
After returning from New York, Shekar started to freelance by conducting workshops, directing plays and figuring out ways to build a career in theatre, as Hyderabad did not have an established scene. Samahaara has organised more than 150 theatre workshops for both beginners and professionals by theatre personalities like Reddy himself, Mike Daisey, Theatre MXT from USA (in association with the US Consulate General Hyderabad), Stu Denison from the UK and David Zinder from Israel. The workshops help promote theatre awareness and increase professional approach and scope in the city. His workshops offer a mix of outdoor theatre activities, reading, analysis, discussion and performances. He has recently completed one hundred workshops, while Samahaara has hosted double that.

== Theatre ==
- The Importance of Being Earnest by Oscar Wilde (English) (Actor-Director)
- Court Martial by Swadesh Deepak (Hindi) (Actor-Director)
- The Bear by Anton Chekhov (English) (Actor-Director)
- The Proposal by Anton Chekhov (English) (Actor-Director)
- Hamlet by William Shakespeare (English) (Actor-Director)
- Dominic Wesley by Anjali Parvati Koda (English) (Actor-Director)
- The Zoo Story by Edward Albee (English) (Actor)
- Purushotham by Anjali Parvati Koda (English) (Actor-Director)
- The Crest of the Peacock by Sarada Devi (English) (Actor)
- Maranoparanth by Surendra Varma (Hindi) (Actor)
- Urubhangam by Bhasa (Telugu) (Actor)
- Pranam Khareedu by A.S.Rao (Telugu) (Actor-Director)
- Bhagavat Ajjukiyam by Bhavabhuthi (Telugu) (Actor)
- Nagamandala by Girish Karnad (Telugu) (Actor)
- Prajanayakudu Prakasham by Prof. M.N.Sharma (Telugu) (Actor)
- Amballa Banda by Bhoopal Reddy (Telugu) (Actor)
- Dongatakam by Vishwanatha Kaviraju (Telugu) (Actor)
- Taj Mahal Ka Tender by Ajay Shukla (Hindi) (Director)
- Karna by Anjali Parvati Koda (English) (Director)
- Beauty and the Beast (Musical) by Gabrielle-Suzanne Barbot de Villeneuve (English) (Director)
- A Distant Plateau by Paul Skye (English) (Director)
- 12 Angry Men by Reginald Rose (English) (Director)
- Jungle Book (Musical) by Rudyard Kipling (English) (Director)
- Gregor Samsa by Anjali Parvati Koda (English) (Director)
- The Good Doctor by Neil Simon (English) (Director)
- The Wizard of Oz (Musical) by L Frank Baum (English) (Director)
- Sound of Music (Musical) by Earnest Lehman (English) (Director)
- Farewell by Team Samahaara (Multilingual) (Director)
- Princess and the frog by The Brothers Grimm (English) (Director)
- Charlie’s Aunt by Brandon Thomas (English) (Director)
- The Last wish Baby Adapted by Anjali Parvati Koda and Team Samahaara (Multilingual) (Director)
- Beyond the land of Hattamala by Badal Sarkar (English) (Director)
- Wait until dark by Frederick Knott (English) (Director)
- Fiddler on the roof (Musical) by Joseph Stein (English) (Director)
- And Then There Were None by Agatha Christie (English) (Director)
- Imaginary Invalid by Molière (English) (Director)
- Isosceles Triangle by C H Phansalkar (Director)

== Filmography ==
| Year | Title | Role | Language | Notes |
|---|---|---|---|---|
| 2011 | Virodhi | Police officer | Telugu | |
| 2012 | Ishq | Raza | Telugu | |
| 2012 | Yamudiki Mogudu | Varuna Deva | Telugu | |
| 2014 | Ente | Vijay | Malayalam | |
| 2014 | Na Bangaaru Talli | Vijay | Telugu | |
| 2014 | Gutthi-the Riddle | Anand Rajan | Hindi | Short film |
| 2014 | Mana Kurralle | | Telugu | |
| 2017 | Yuddham Sharanam | | Telugu | |
| 2023 | The Great Indian Suicide | Nirmal Maharaj | Telugu | |
| 2025 | Mirai | Kyza | Telugu | |

=== Television ===
Rathna Shekar Reddy hosted a TV Show Wow Emi Ruchi for more than 100 shows.
