= Samahaara =

Indian theatre group

- Formation: 2004
- Type: Theatre group
- Purpose: Theatre
- Members: Rathna Shekar Reddy and Anjali Parvati Koda
- Website: Official website

Samahaara is an Indian theatre group based in Hyderabad. It was founded by two young theatre personalities, the actor-director Rathna Shekar Reddy and the playwright Anjali Parvati Koda. The group began with touring its maiden production, The Crest of the Peacock, an educational play on mathematics across the twin cities to schools and colleges, staging more than 50 shows. Their play Purushotham-He, the Victim of Spiders and Pressure Cookers written by Anjali Parvati Koda has received critical acclaim. The productions include the original plays, Dominic Wesley, written by Koda and directed by the UK-based Stu Denison, Gregor Samsa, Karna and The Last Wish Baby.Unlucky (based on Samuel Beckett's plays) also directed by Denison, Rabindranath Tagore's Post Office, Woody Allen's God, Athol Fugard's The Island, “Acharya Tartuffe”, Hindi adaptation of Moliere’s controversial play ‘Le Tartuffe’, Edward Albee's Zoo Story. The army courtroom Hindi drama Court Martial by Swadesh Deepak has been performed and toured all over India by the group with Rathna Shekar essaying the role of Bikas Rai and has been cited as "gripping","engrossing and pathbreaking" and powerful. Oscar Wilde's The Importance of Being Earnest was staged by the group and the actors received positive reviews about their "great comic timing".

== The Hyderabad Theatre Festival ==
Samahaara is credited with making theatre popular and involving the young in Hyderabad. Its most significant contribution to the theatre of India, apart from the original productions, has been organizing theatre festivals, namely The Hyderabad Theatre Festival 2009, The Hyderabad Theatre and Short-Film Festival 2010 and the Samahaara Hyderabad Theatre and Rock Music Festival 2011. and Hyderabad Theatre Festival 2012. The Hyderabad Theatre Festivals (HTF) have been instrumental in bringing together the various amateur and professional theatre groups in Hyderabad and improving the quality and scale of the plays. They have been a great boost for theatre groups in Hyderabad.

Many of Samahaara's stand-alone productions are performed at auditoriums across the city, including the open-cultural center Lamakaan, the iconic Ravindra Bharathi, Telugu University and Bharatiya Vidya Bhavan. HTF 2009 was held in June 2009 at Bharatiya Vidya Bhavan, HTF 2010 was held at Ravindra Bharathi for 7 days in July 2010 and HTF 2011 was held in December 2011 at three venues: Bharatiya Vidya Bhavan, Ravindra Bharathi and Taramati Baradari. HTF 2012 was held in December at Bharatiya Vidya Bhavan.

== Founders ==
Rathna Shekar Reddy Reddy is a Hyderabadi theatre and Telugu film actor and an alumnus of the Lee Strasberg Theatre and Film Institute. He is best known for his critically acclaimed theatre productions like Purushotham, Dominic Wesley, Last Wish Baby, Gregor Samsa and others and his work in movies like Ishq (Telugu) and Ente (Malayalam). His body of work includes The Imaginary Invalid, Fiddler on the Roof, Purushotham, Wait Until Dark, The Last Wish Baby.

Reddy conducts theatre workshops which run full, trains actors for both stage and cinema and produces and directs plays for both Samahaara and outside institutions like schools, colleges, corporates and others. His upcoming releases are Mana Kuralle in which he plays a negative lead, Antha Scene Ledu, lead in the award-winning Naa Bangaaru Thalli, Yuddham Sharanam and others. His TV show Wow Emi Ruchi for which he was the host for more than a 100 episodes gained him tremendous popularity on the small screen.

He has been involved in theatre in Hyderabad, where he has provided mentorship and created opportunities for young performers to develop and showcase their talent.

Anjali Parvati Koda is a critically acclaimed playwright and writer in films. Her father is filmmaker Mohan Koda and brother Rahul Koda is a screenwriter in Telugu who co-wrote Telugu movies including Anaganaga O Dheerudu, Panjaa. She wrote her first play Purushotham-He, the Victim of Spiders and Pressure Cookers at 18, and later on penned Dominic Wesley, directed by Stu Denison, which received rave reviews including "well-written and witty". She co-wrote the adaptation of Samahaara's hit production 'The Last Wish Baby', a satirical comedy which is one of Hyderabad's most popular plays with reviews calling it a "laugh riot" and a "must watch". Her next play was Gregor Samsa, a stage adaptation of Franz Kafka's Metamorphosis which was critically acclaimed with reviews citing "at once horrific and comic, thanks to the deft adaptation and impressive performances". Her first play Purushotham, He the Victim of Spiders and Pressure Cookers was included in the syllabus for prestigious universities abroad including for Rutgers, State University of New Jersey

Her next play Karna was funded by National School of Drama, and it "deviates from the traditional portrayals" and is inspired by the great Indian epic Mahabharata and interprets it from Karna's point of view.

She is also a standup comedian. She has directed short films and web series. She was honoured by Alliance Francaise, Hyderabad which hosted a group art exhibition, ‘NavDevi’ celebrating diversity of talent and creativity in women by putting up an exhibit with quotes from her plays and her photographs. She has written dialogue for Telugu films. She has acted in plays such as Hamlet and Anton Chekov's The Bear.

== Theatre workshops ==
Samahaara is one of the most active theatre groups in India, with a number of theatre workshops for both beginners and professionals by theatre personalities like Rathna Shekar Reddy, Mike Daisey, Theatre MXT from USA (in association with the US Consulate General Hyderabad), Stu Denison from the UK and David Zinder from Israel. Samahaara runs weekday Production Oriented Theatre Workshops which end in productions by the participants and weekend theatre workshops for beginners. The workshops help promote theatre awareness and increase professional approach and scope in the city. Rathna Shekar designs all the workshops by Samahaara and has mentored thousands of people in acting and theatre. He has recently completed a hundred workshops on his own, while Samahaara has done more than 175 workshops so far.
