= Rajesh Touchriver =

Indian film director

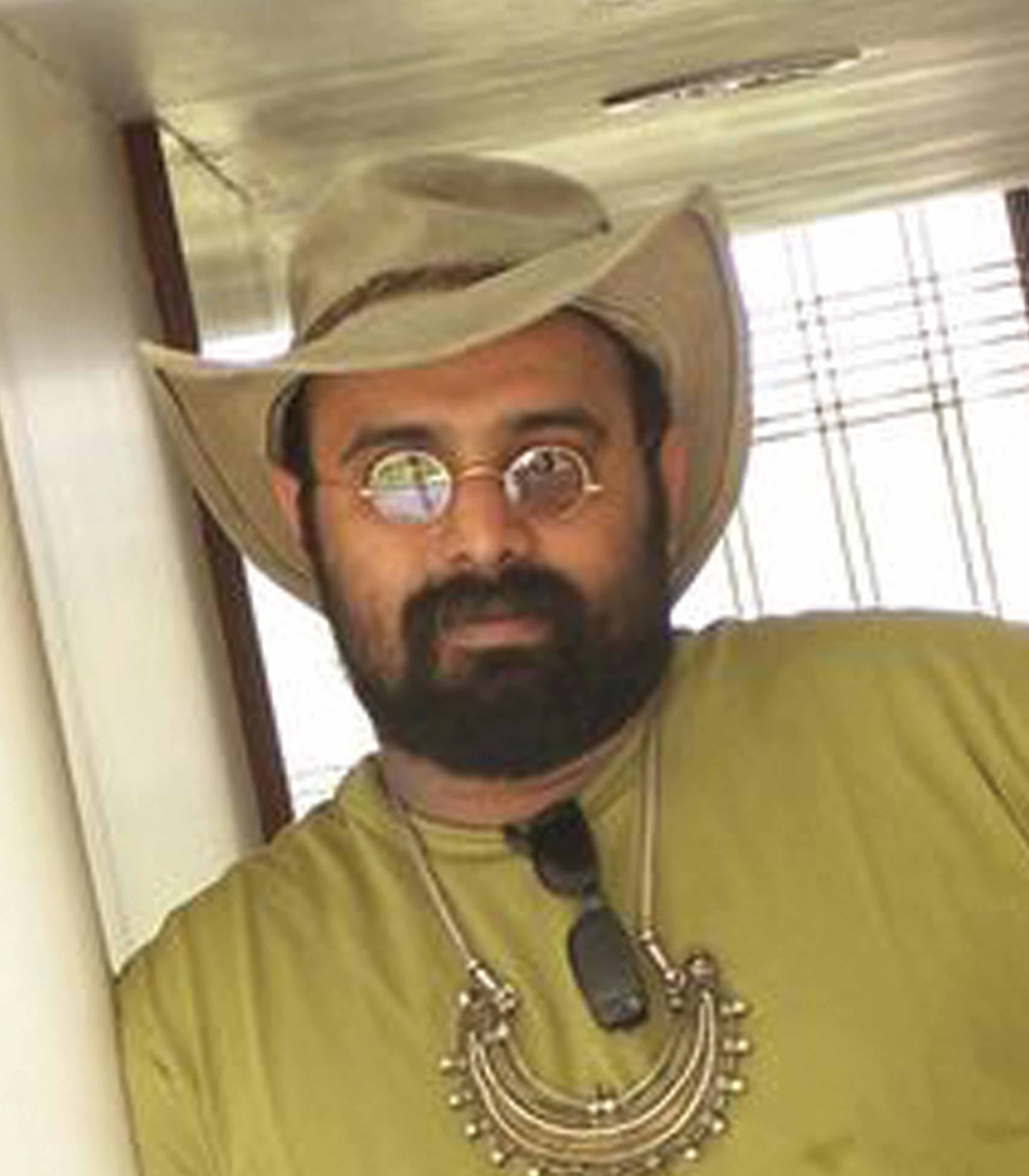
- Born: M. S. Rajesh; Arakulam, Idukki, Kerala, India
- Occupations: Film Director, Producer, Designer, Writer
- Years active: 1992 – present
- Spouse: Sunitha Krishnan
- Website: www.rajeshtouchriver.com

Rajesh Touchriver (born M. S. Rajesh) is an Indian film director, screenwriter, and producer known for his works in English, Malayalam, Telugu, and Hindi language films. He received various National and International honors for his works. In 2002 he directed In the Name of Buddha which was later screened in the Spotlight on India section at the 2003 Cannes Film Festival. In 2013, he scripted, and directed the social problem film Naa Bangaaru Talli which won five International honours, the National Film Award for Best Feature Film in Telugu, and four state Nandi awards including Second Best Feature Film.

== Early life ==
M. S. Rajesh was born in Arakulam, Idukki district, Kerala, India as the youngest son of Siva Sankaran Nair and Rukmini Amma. He had some early training in Kalaripayattu. He took his bachelor's degree in Design and Direction from the School of Drama and Fine Arts in 1992, Thrissur, Kerala.

== Early career ==
He worked with the National School of Drama, New Delhi as a designer in 1995. By the year 1998, he had directed more than 30 plays in Malayalam, English and Telugu languages. Rajesh won the Charles Wallace Trust Award in 2001 and pursued his master's degree in visual language/scenography and direction from the Wimbledon College of Art, London. He worked in the art department of Bavagaru Bagunnara! (1998).

Rajesh's debut film In the Name of Buddha (2002) was premiered at the Oslo International Film Festival and won critical acclaim. Controversial in theme, the film is a treatment of the ethnic conflict then raging in Sri Lanka. The film was screened at international film festivals in 2003 and won the Best Foreign Film award at the Beverly Hills International Film Festival, the Newport Beach International Film Festival and at the Wine Country International Film Festival in the same year. Rajesh directed two Telugu films in the interim: 10 the Strangers and Alex, the Blue Fox.

== Filmography ==
Year	Title	Language	Notes			
Year	Title	Language	Notes	2002	In the Name of Buddha	English; Tamil; Sinhala; Hindi
2004	Premayanamaha	Telugu	Art director			
2005	10-The Strangers	Telugu				
2005	Alex-The Blue Fox	Telugu				
2013	Ente	Malayalam; Telugu	Also producer Titled as Naa Bangaaru Talli in Telugu			
2019	Raktham – The Blood	Telugu				
2023	MINDGAME	ODIA	Writer & Director			
2023	Dahini - The Witch	Hindi				

== Other work ==
=== Documentaries and short films ===
Rajesh has made several short films and documentaries on human trafficking, HIV/AIDS and communal riots that support the media advocacy initiatives of the United Nations and NGOs, national and international. His film for the United Nations, One Life, No Price for social sensitisation against human trafficking was well received by civil society organisations internationally.

Anamika, the Nameless on a similar theme which was shot in the red light areas of India in Mumbai, Kolkata, Pune and Delhi, won the AC award under the "Best Foreign Award – Documentary Short Film" category and the Best Documentary Film Award at the Hyderabad International Film Festival. The film has been included in the curriculum of National Police Academy and National Judicial Academy.

The Sacred Face, a short film on child sexual abuse, sent the audience back home unsettled at its screening in Hyderabad. Following the success of in the Name of Buddha, Rajesh directed the music video for "Sunshowers" for Maya Arulpragasam (M.I.A.).

=== Music videos – screenplay, direction ===
- "Sunshowers" for MIA XL Recording, London, UK (3 mins, English, Super 16 mm, 2004)
- "Hire Fire" for Prajwala (music album containing six 4 mins songs against human trafficking, Hindi/Telugu, DV, 2004)

== Awards ==
National Film Awards

- Best Feature Film in Telugu – Na Bangaaru Talli (2013)

Nandi Awards

- Second Best Feature Film - Na Bangaaru Talli (2013)

== Other honors ==
- Best Director (Regional cinema) Rajasthan International Film Festival 2018
- Best Foreign Feature Film Award – Crossing The Screen International Film Festival 2017.
- Award of Excellence from IFFCRM, Indonesia – 2013
- Best Filmmaker of the Year Award IFFCRM, Jakarta, Indonesia – 2013
- Award of Excellence from IFFCRM, Indonesia – 2013
- Best Feature Film Award Trinity International Film Festival – 2013
- Best Documentary Film Award Hyderabad International Film Festival – 2008
- Best Editing Award Festival De Cine De Granada – 2007
- Best Foreign Documentary film Award Action Cut International Film Festival 2006
- Outstanding Alumnus Award – School of Drama- 2003
- Best Film Award Wine country International Film Festival- 2003
- Best Film Award New port Beach International Film Festival – 2003
- Best Foreign Film Award - Beverly Hills International Film Festival- 2003
- The Charles Wallace India Trust Award.- 2001
- Indie International Best Foreign Feature Film – Raktham – The Blood
- Indie International Best Overall Feature Film – Peoples Choice – Raktham – The Blood
