= Manch Theatre =

Indian theatre group

- Formation: 2004
- Type: Theatre group
- Location: Hyderabad, India

Manch Theatre is an Indian theatre group based in Hyderabad. Manch was formed as a hobby club at Infosys in 2004. Since 2009 the group has produced and staged several acclaimed plays in English, Hindi and Telugu.

== Background ==
Manch Theatre was formed in Infosys Hyderabad as a hobby club for theatre enthusiasts. For the first few years it remained the same staging occasional plays for internal events. It was not until the Samahaara Hyderabad Theatre festival, 2010, Manch started to become a known name in the Hyderabad theatre circuits. Manch staged Deepak Morris' comedy caper Business is War for the festival. Later Manch went on producing several critically acclaimed plays in English, Hindi and Telugu like John Patrick Shanley's Doubt: A Parable, Yasmina Reza's God of Carnage, Tennessee Williams' The Glass Menagerie and Nadira Babbar's Ji, Jaisi Aapki Marzi.

Manch Theatre Participated in Vijayawada's 18th Hasya Natikala potilu organized in the memory of Jandhyala Garu, where it won second Best Play prize and Sirisha from the team won the Best Actress award. Later in the 20th Hasya Natikala potilu conducted in 2015 July, Manch presented its original play Arangetram, written and directed by Srikanth Banala. In 2016, Again MANCH presented its original comic play "Chai Edi Bey?", written and directed by Srikanth Banala in NANDI NAATAKOTSAVAM (2016), Organized by Andhra Pradesh. In 2017, NANDI NAATAKOTSAVAM, a patriotic Telugu Play "ADUGU", written and directed by Harsha Chakilam received accolodes and appreciations from Theatre Professionals.

== Productions ==
- 12 Angry Men (First Performed on 31 March 2011)
- Business is War! (First Performed on 13 April 2011)
- Ji, Jaisi Aapki Marzi (First Performed on 8 Nov 2011)
- Doubt: A Parable (First Performed on 3 March 2012)
- Who Let the Dogs Out! (First Performed on 14 March 2012)
- Sleuth (First Performed on 21 March 2012)
- God of Carnage (First Performed on 23 June 2012)
- Thaali: A Plateful of Plays (Performed on 6 October 2012)
- Cocktail - Love Lust & Lies (Performed on 5 January 2013)
- The Debut (Performed on 26 February 2013)
- The Glass Menagerie (First Performed on 24 March 2013)
- Don't Worry, Be Happy (First performed on 18 June 2013)
- Happily Ever After (Performed on 13 July 2013)
- Fireworks
- Darpan 29 Nov 2014
- Sarada Sayanthram 5 Jan 2015
- Arangetram 10 July, 26 July (Vijayawada)
- Shakti Nelone Undhi 21 OCT 2015,
- Navvula Muvvalu 10 Dec 2015,
- Laaga Chunri Mein Daag 16 Dec 2015
- Mee Sammatham (Performed on Jan 30,31st 2016)
- Premante? (Performed on 14 Feb 2016)
- AB Chubhti Hai Ye Khamoshi - A Street play on Women's Day (Performed on 8 Mar 2016)
- Gaardhabaandam - Written by Tanikella Bharani (27 May 2016)
- Swamy Kalyanam
- LOOT- Independence Day Street Play
- Nuvvu Chavali
- Goonj
- Shakti
- Chai Edi Bey?
- Rab Ke Bande - Hindi Street play
- Adugu
- Apraadh
- Spoorthi
- Mana Kala
- Oo Prema Oo Donga
- Bhavitha
- Theerpu
- Dippam
- Aa antey?
- Aakhari Swayamvaram
- Paanch laakh ka hawai jahaj
- Dusari Pari
- Jal Jangal Jameen
- Panditlo Pelli Vantintlo Lolli
- Pedanayana
- William Shakespeare's THE TEMPEST
- William Shakespeare's HAMLET
- Sipahi ki Maa
- Dhoka
- Kirayedaar
- Honeymoon
