= Ente (film) =

Ente Naa Bangaaru Talli
- Poster in Malayalam
- Directed by: Rajesh Touchriver
- Written by: Rajesh Touchriver
- Produced by: Sunitha Krishnan; Rajesh Touchriver
- Starring: Siddique; Anjali Patil; Lakshmi Menon; Neena Kurup; Rathna Shekar
- Cinematography: Rama Thulasi
- Edited by: Don Max
- Music by: Songs: Sharreth; Shantanu Moitra; Background Score: Shantanu Moitra
- Production companies: Sun Touch Productions; Prajwala
- Release dates: 4 January 2013 (Malayalam); November 2013 (Indonesian Film Festival); 21 November 2014 (Telugu)
- Country: India
- Languages: Malayalam; Telugu

Poster of the Telugu version of the film, Naa Bangaaru Talli.

Ente (transl. Mine) is a 2013 Indian social problem film written and directed by Rajesh Touchriver. Based on a real-life story, the film stars Siddique, Anjali Patil, Lakshmi Menon, Neena Kurup, and Rathna Shekar. The film is co-produced by Rajesh Touchriver and Sunitha Krishnan, an internationally known anti-trafficking crusader. It explores the consequences of sex trafficking, testing the vulnerability of trust in human relations. The film was simultaneously produced in Malayalam and Telugu, with the latter version titled Naa Bangaaru Talli (transl. My golden girl).

The film was first released in Malayalam. The Telugu version of the film was released on 21 November 2014 with public funding. It received highly positive reviews, winning awards such as Best Film at the Trinity International Film Festival in Detroit. At the 61st National Film Awards, Na Bangaaru Talli won three awards including the award for Best Feature Film in Telugu.

== Plot ==
Srinivas is a social worker from Amalapuram. His daughter Durga is a studious girl who performs well in her academics. She is also active in protesting the atrocities against women. Srinivas is proud of his daughter. He frequently visits Hyderabad on the pretext of work, but nobody knows what he does. After completing her Intermediate with flying colors, Durga wishes to go to Hyderabad for her further education. Srinivas initially opposes her decision, claiming that Hyderabad is unsafe, and tries to convince her to study in a nearby town, but when she persists, he reluctantly agrees.

Srinivas travels to Hyderabad with his daughter, and they stay at a hotel. Srinivas receives a phone call and immediately leaves after cautioning his daughter. It is revealed that Srinivas is actually a broker who lures innocent girls into the flesh trade. A woman whom Srinivas once deceived wants revenge, and so she kidnaps his daughter. Srinivas returns to the hotel and is shocked to find Durga missing. He frantically searches for her, but his efforts are in vain.

Durga tries to escape, but is forced into prostitution. One day, she is taken to an expensive resort for a wealthy businessman. There, she attacks the businessman, and the same woman who kidnapped her helps her run away. Coincidentally, Durga is spotted by her fiancé, who, even without knowing anything, helps her escape and takes her back to their village. A dejected Srinivas returns home without his daughter. Disgusted by the fact that her father is a pimp, Durga spits on his face. Feeling ashamed, Srinivas commits suicide.

== Cast ==
- Siddique as Srinivas
- Anjali Patil as Durga
- Lakshmi Menon as Padma
- Neena Kurup as Manjula, Durga's mother
- Rathna Shekar Reddy as Vijay, Durga's fiancé
- Anoop Aravindan as Mohan Reddy
- Anuradha as Chandini
- Harika as Neelima
- Shravani as Shalini
- Warren Joseph as Murugan

== Production ==
The film was initially titled Prathyayam in Telugu.

== Music ==
Telugu

No	Song	Singer(s)	Composer(s)	Writer(s)
2	"Paavunai Oka"	Shreya Ghoshal	Shantanu Moitra	Ananta Sriram
4	"Paavunai Oka" (Unplugged)	Shreya Ghoshal	Shantanu Moitra	Ananta Sriram
6	"Paavunai Oka" (Humming)	Shreya Ghoshal	Shantanu Moitra	Ananta Sriram
	"Paavunai Oka Paavunai" (Karaoke)	Shantanu Moitra	Shantanu Moitra	Ananta Sriram
3	"Ee Raagala Poomalvo"	Jeevan Padmakumar, Seena	Sharreth	Garlapati Venkata Raju
1	"Chiru Chilake"	Ranjini Jose	Sharreth	Garlapati Venkata Raju
5	"Lokale Neekosam"	Sharreth	Sharreth	Garlapati Venkata Raju
8	"Chiru Chinuke" (Karaoke)	Sharreth	Sharreth	Garlapati Venkata Raju

== Reception ==
Jabir Mushthari of The Hindu wrote, "All said, ending a film at the right place, in the right way is so crucial for its overall fineness. Mr. Rajesh has done it precisely and brilliantly. Just to experience the poignancy of its ending, one can buy a ticket for Ente".

== Awards (Note: For the Telugu version) ==
National Film Awards (2014)

- Best Feature Film in Telugu - Na Bangaaru Talli
- Best Background Score - Shantanu Moitra
- Special Mention - Anjali Patil

Nandi Awards (2013)

- Nandi Award for Best Feature Film (silver) - Sunitha Krishnan
- Nandi Award for Best Actress - Anjali Patil
- Nandi Special Jury Award - Siddique

Trinity International Film Festival (2013)

- Best Feature Film - Naa Bangaaru Talli

== Official selections ==
- Indonesian Film Festival (2013)
- Beijing International Film Festival (2014)
- Myrtle Beach International Film Festival (2014)
- Asia Pacific Screen Awards (2014)
- Indian Film Festival of Ireland (2014)
- 20th Kolkata International Film Festival (2014)
