= In the Name of Buddha =

- Directed by: Rajesh Touchriver
- Written by: Raja Chandrasekhar (dialogues)
- Screenplay by: Rajesh Touchriver
- Story by: Sai George
- Produced by: K. Shanmughathas; Sai George
- Starring: Shiju; Sonia; Sunil Kudavattoor; Jyothilal
- Cinematography: Jain Joseph; Raja Ratnam
- Edited by: Ranjan Abraham
- Music by: C Rajamani
- Production companies: Da'Sai Films International; Sai Ann Films
- Release date: 2002
- Running time: 137 minutes
- Countries: United Kingdom; Sri Lanka
- Languages: English; Tamil; Sinhala; Hindi

In the Name of Buddha is a 2002 multilingual survival drama film directed by Rajesh Touchriver and produced by K. Shanmughathas and Sai George. Starting Shiju and Sonia, the film tells the story of a Sri Lankan Tamil doctor Siva, which is based on a true story heard by the producer.

After its world premiere at the Oslo International Film Festival, the film proved controversial but garnered critical acclaim for its subject matter and was banned in Sri Lanka. It won the Best Foreign Film at the Beverly Hills Film Festival and the Audience Award at the Newport Beach Film Festival.

== Cast ==
- Shiju as Dr. Shiva / Buddha
- Sonia
- Sunil Kudavattoor
- Jyothilal

== Production ==
In London, Rajesh Touchriver met Sai George, who narrated the story of a man in his final year of his MBBS studies in Colombo abandoned his studies and came as a refugee to England. Touchriver developed the story into a film, which was shot in 52 days in India as the director felt that some parts of Tamil Nadu and Kerala resembled Sri Lanka.
