= Tajalli Productions =

- Founded: 2016; 10 years ago
- Founder: Jamaat-e-Islami Hind, Telangana chapter
- Headquarters: Hyderabad
- Key people: Syed Faqruddin Ali Ahmed; Zayeemuddin Ahmed; Shaik Abdul Ghani; Syed Anas Razvi
- Products: Short Films; Talk Shows

Tajalli Productions is an online digital infotainment channel, which produces short films, talk shows, interviews, social experiments, lectures on various social, political, and Islamic issues.

== Web series ==
- Busting Myths about Muslims (2019)
- Desh Badal Raha Hai (2018)
- Lessons from Surah Yusuf (2018)
- Daily Quranic Summary (2017)
- Baat Mein Baat (2016–present)
- Glimpses from the Qur'an (2016)
- Manazir-e-Qurani (2016)

== Short films ==
- Pani Pani Re
- Clean Eid-ul-Adha
- Talaq - In the name of women's welfare.
- Shukr Alhamdulilah (2025)
- Taare Bikhar Gaye (2025)

== Content ==
=== Shukr Alhamdulillah (2025) ===
Shukr Alhamdulillah is an Indian short film produced by Deccan Media House and Tajalli Productions, centered on the theme of gratitude and moral values in everyday life. The film explores the lives of four individuals in a bustling urban setting, each grappling with personal challenges while holding on to the unifying power of faith and thankfulness. Conceptualized by Zayeemuddin Ahmed and directed by Mohd Raheem, the film features Faheem ul Haq in a pivotal role, alongside Jameel Shah, Azad Khan, Muhammad Arfat Khan, and Jamal Khan. The film's poignant message is enhanced by the cinematographic and editing work of Syed Saif Uddin, Musaib Hussain, and Waliullah Farhan.

=== Taare Bikhar Gaye (2025) ===
Taare Bikhar Gaye (2025) is an Indian short film that focuses on the tumultuous aftermath of a sudden tragedy befalling a happy family. The storyline centers on how silence gives way to turmoil as suppressed emotions surface, bonds are tested, and invisible wounds speak louder than words. Directed and written by Mohd Raheem, with a story by Zayeemuddin Ahmed, the film employs minimal dialogue to convey its deeply emotional narrative. The visual tone is shaped by cinematographer Imtiyaz Qureshi, while Saif Uddin and Musaib Hussain oversaw the editing. Sound design including foley, music, and background score was handled by Max Productions, and color grading (D.I.) was managed by Waliullah Farhan, Nayab Abdul Kareem, and Tanu Garg. Manohar Bagde served as the chief assistant director. The film is widely recognized for its evocative visual style, emotional resonance, and the powerful storytelling achieved through silence and visual nuance.
