= Kris Chetan Ramlu =

Chetan Ramlu
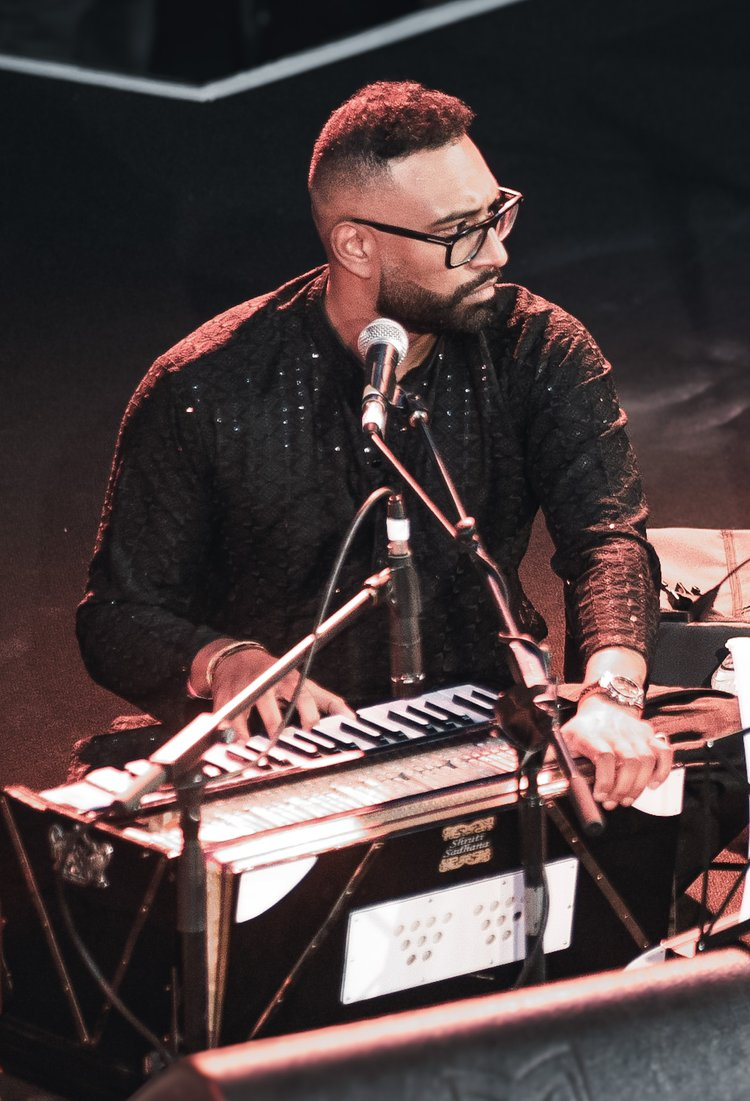

Background information
- Born: Kris Chetan Ramlu; 15 September 1989 (age 36)
- Origin: Wellington, New Zealand
- Genres: Qawwali, Classical, fusion
- Instruments: Tabla, percussion, harmonium
- Years active: 2003–present

Kris 'Chetan' Ramlu (Hindi: चेतन रामलु) is a New Zealand musician of Fijian-Indian descent, recognized for his skills as a multi-instrumentalist, singer, and music producer. Chetan embarked on his musical journey at a young age, eventually gaining opportunities to collaborate with acclaimed artists from around the globe.

== Early life ==
Chetan, born and raised in New Zealand, hails from Fijian-Indian ancestry. He was introduced to the world of music at the age of 10, initially focusing on the tabla, a pair of tuned hand drums from India. Under the guidance of his father and later his ustaad, Muhammad Sardar Khan of Hyderabad, Chetan honed his skills as a tabla player and began performing at concerts by the age of 12. While learning tabla, Chetan also studied the art of Hindustani Classical singing with ghazal maestro Pandit Vithal Rao.

His passion for music extended beyond traditional Indian genres, as he expressed interest in Western music, particularly in instruments such as the piano, drums, and vocals. Chetan continued to explore his musical horizons during his education at St. Patrick's College, Wellington, where he actively participated in various musical groups, including Con Anima, the Jazz Band and the Chappel Band.

Chetan pursued higher education at Victoria University of Wellington, studying Law and Commerce, all the while dedicating time to cultivate his musical skills. He captained the Victoria University Senior Reserve cricket team and is a winner of the 'Tyler McKnight Cup' for bowling figures of 8 for 27 while playing for the Eastern Suburbs Cricket Club.

== Career ==
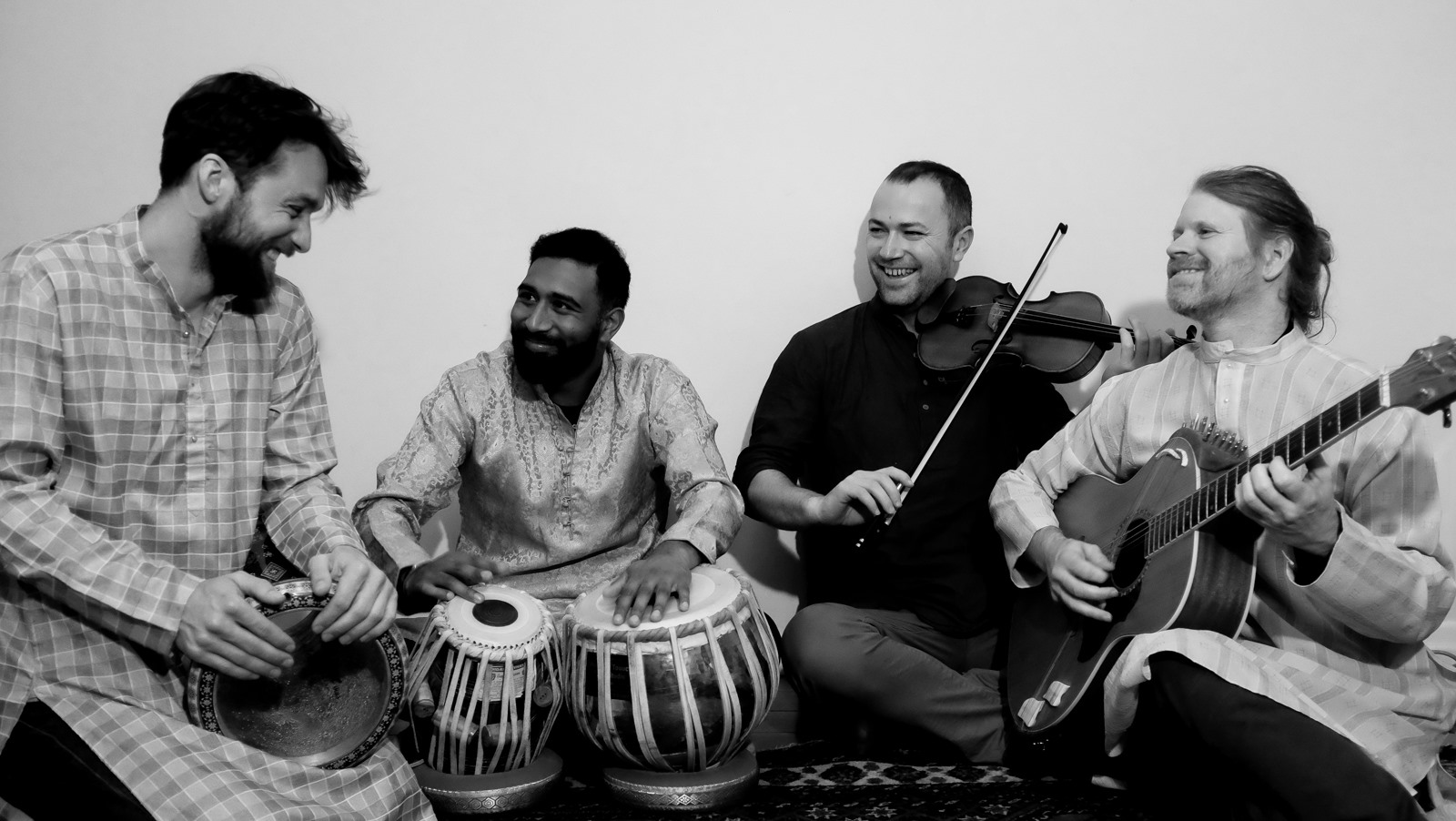
Chetan with Shades of Shakti, 2020

Chetan joined the Indo-Fusion band Moksha (later renamed Doosra), where he showcased his prowess as a tabla player between 2002 and 2011. However, his journey didn't confine him to a single genre or instrument, as he constantly evolved as a musician. In 2007, Chetan began performing with singer-songwriter Raashi Malik, known for her role as vocalist in the Wellington super-dub band Rhombus (band).

In 2016, Chetan embarked on a new chapter by joining Tahir Qawwal and Party, immersing himself in the mystical world of Qawwali. His collaboration with Tahir Qawwal and Party lasted until 2019 when Tahir relocated to Bali.

In recent years, Chetan has delved into various musical collaborations, bridging the gap between Eastern and Western musical traditions. Notably, he collaborated with Wellington musicians Justin 'Firefly' Clarke, Tristan Carter, and Thomas Friggens in the tribute band 'Shades of Shakti', dedicated to paying homage to the influential fusion group, Shakti (band). This collaboration led to a memorable performance at the New Zealand Festival of the Arts, where they received a standing ovation. This performance marked a poignant moment as it occurred just before New Zealand faced lockdown due to the COVID-19 pandemic.

During the pandemic, Chetan embarked on the 'Lockdown Gharana' project, leveraging the power of social media, particularly Facebook. He brought together musicians from around the world, spreading joy and harmony through music during challenging times.

Chetan continued to thrive musically through collaborations with a variety of Western and Indian artists, including Hans Raj Hans, Papon, Sajjad Ali, Vaishali Samant, Rhian Sheehan, Aaradhna, Zain-Zohaib and others.

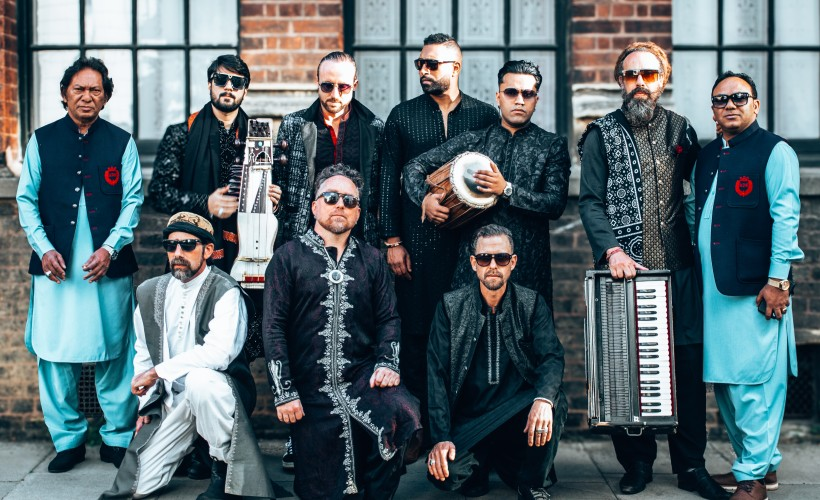
Chetan with Fanna-Fi-Allah outside Union Chappell in 2024, featuring Dildar Hussain.

In 2024, Chetan reunited with Tahir Qawwal, this time as a vocalist and harmonium player, joining 'Fanna-Fi-Allah' for their United States/Canada and United Kingdom/Europe tours.

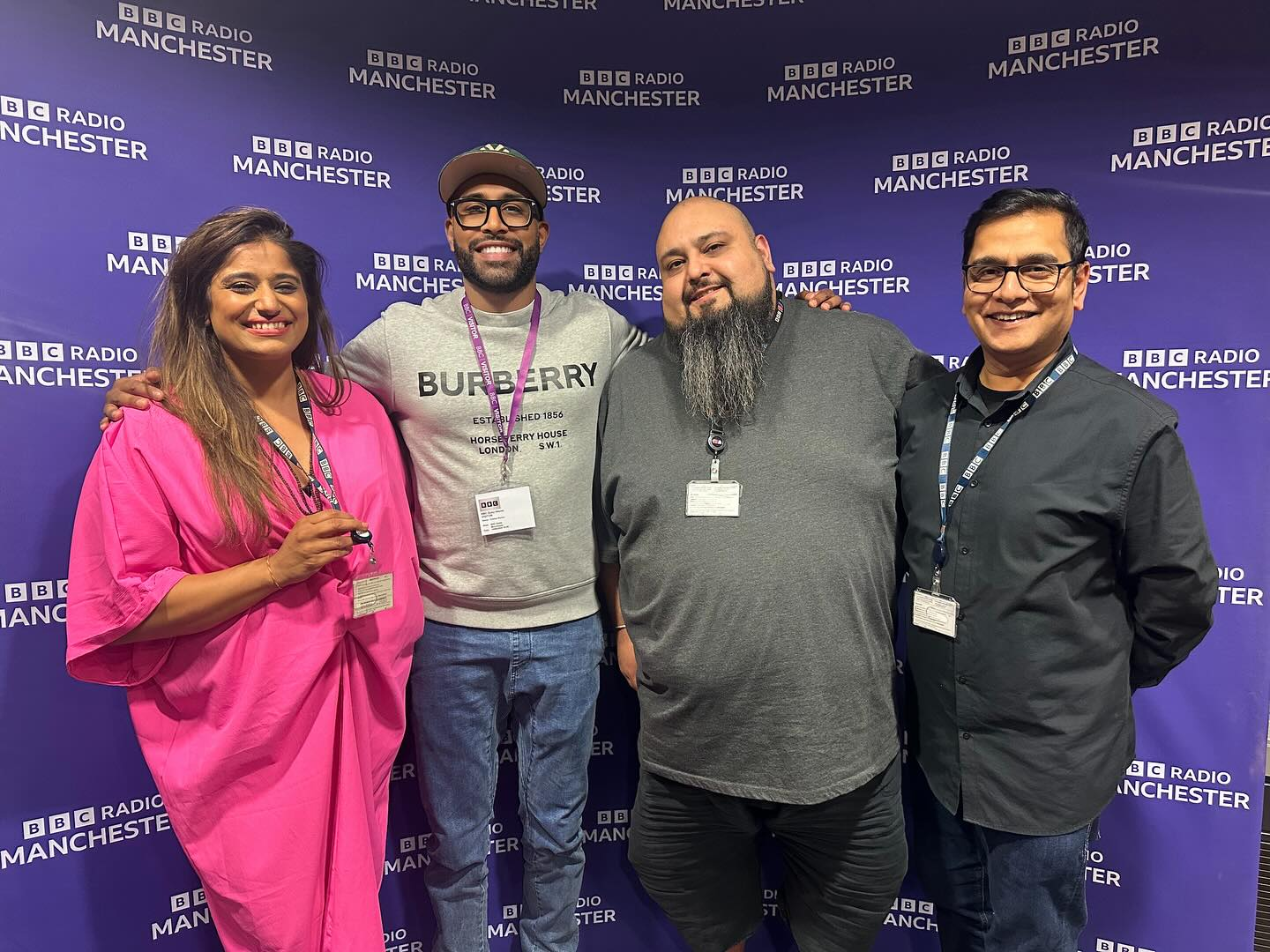
Chetan with Raees Khan at BBC Manchester.

In a BBC Manchester interview, Chetan revealed that his childhood hero was Ustad Dildar Hussain, the tabla player for Ustad Nusrat Fateh Ali Khan. Their first performance together took place at Birmingham Town Hall in 2024, marking a significant milestone for Chetan. It's a full circle experience for him, as his journey into Nusrat Fateh Ali Khan's music began with the album Nusrat Fateh Ali Khan & Party - Birmingham Town Hall UK Concert 1993, Vol. 142.

Chetan was profiled in The Fiji Times article "Beating to His Own Rhythm," published on 29 May 2025, in which he discussed his Fijian-Indian heritage, musical background, and both current and upcoming projects.

== Discography ==
Chetan's contributions to the world of music extend beyond his performances and collaborations, including notable features on various singles and albums. Among his notable appearances is his feature on Aaradhna's 2023 single, "She". He also features on Tyson Smith's 2009 album, There's Nothing We Can't Pretend.

== Personal life ==
Chetan now resides in Australia, where he has transitioned his professional focus to the field of finance. Despite his career, Chetan's passion for music remains undiminished, and he continues to pursue his musical endeavors alongside his professional commitments.
