= Naina Ashwin Kumar =

Naina Ashwin Kumar, also known as Naina Wonderkid, is an Indian table tennis player. She was born in Hyderabad, the capital of the Indian state Andhra Pradesh, on 22 March 2000.

== Academic studies ==
Under an international General Certificate of Secondary Education, this ambidextrous young lady appeared for the Grade 10 exam at the age of eight. Completing the examination, conducted by the Cambridge International Examinations CIE Board, she became the youngest Asian girl to pass that level of testing. At the end of Ms. Kumar's tenth year, she also completed Grades 11 and 12 from Andhra Pradesh Board of Intermediate Education. At age 12, she had already began her sophomore year toward a B.A. in Mass Communication at St. Mary's College.

At age seven, she recorded a music album. The CD includes her singing Ramayana: The Epic.

She translated the Bhagavad Gita into English. Naina learned the basics of English, Hindi and her region's primary language between 5 and 7 of age.

== Table tennis ==
In Table Tennis, Naina Ashwin Kumar became a national champion, winning the bronze medal in the sub-junior girls category. Kumar achieved quarter-finalist status in the junior girls competition. In team events, Naina won gold in the under twelve, fourteen, and sixteen age brackets in 2010. In Jammu and Kashmir she took first place in the sub-junior singles. She was awarded bronze in Bolpur and won the south zone title in Bangalore in 2012. She also won the team bronze medal during the youth girls nationals competition. All of this makes her 'state topper' in under twelve, fourteen, and sixteen age brackets. She was ranked number one in sub-junior girls for table tennis in India.

Outside of India, Naina participated in an international table tennis tournament, which was held in Austria, and achieved 6th seed. She represented India at a training camp in China. With that group, she participated in an Asian junior championship in New Delhi. She also played at the India Junior & Cadet Open in Dehradun and won team gold in cadets and bronze in the individuals competition.
