= Osman Misri =

Indian bodybuilder (born 1997)

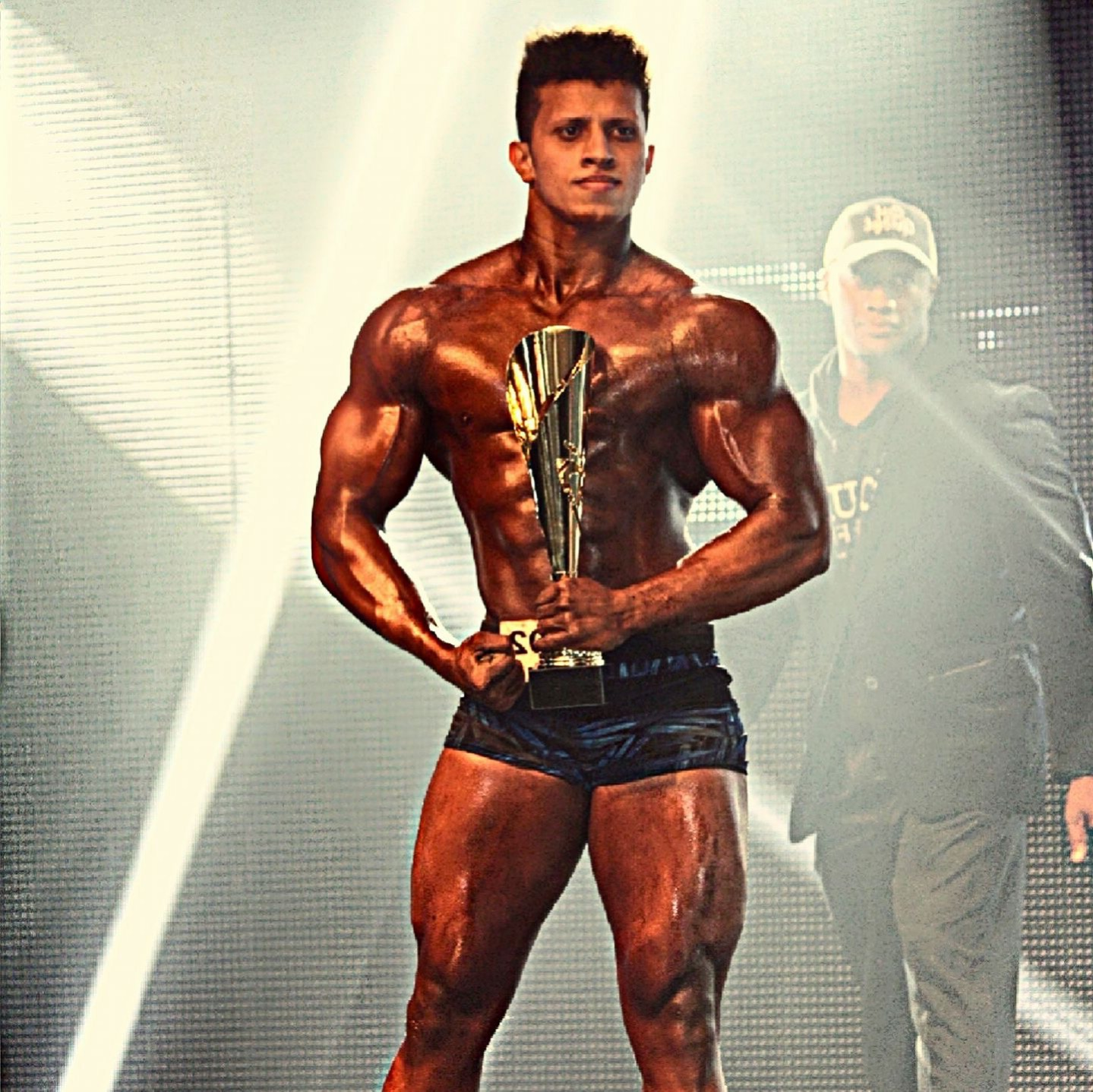
- Born: 27 September 1997 (age 27); Hyderabad, Telangana, India
- Known for: Mr. Musclemania Universe 2016, Mr Musclemania America 2017

Osman Misri (born 27 September 1997) is an Indian professional bodybuilder from Hyderabad, Telangana State, India, who won multiple titles in both national and international championships. The highest title he won was the Silver medallist at the 2017 Mr Musclemania America Championship in the junior category.

== Titles ==
- Mr. Musclemania Universe (2016)
- Mr. Musclemania America (2017)

== Early life and education ==
Born in Hyderabad, India, to Esa Bin Obaid Misri and Farhana Begum, Osman Misri was student of Mukarram Jah High School.

Osman Misri said: "The president of Muscle Mania Zuvik was inspired by me at Musclemania India competition and invited me to the United States Musclemania Universe Championship."
