= Mangala Mani =

Indian scientist

- Born: India
- Organization: Indian Space Research Organisation (ISRO)

Mangala Mani is an Indian scientist. She is the first ISRO female scientist to live more than a year in Antarctica. Mani was chosen for the BBC's 100 Women Challenge for their Women in Science series.

== Early life and education ==
Mani was the eldest among the six children. She completed her school from the Holy Mary Girls High School, Saifabad. She inspired to join a space organisation after reading a NASA newspaper article about Mars. She obtained her Model Diploma for Technicians-Radio Apparatus (MDT-RA) from Masab Tank Government Polytechnic in Hyderabad. Mani was the only female in the class of 80.

== Career ==
Mani began her apprenticeship with HAL in Balanagar shortly after receiving her diploma. She was summoned to the interview with ISRO. She received an appointment order to join the ISRO within three weeks after the interview. A team of ISRO scientists finished a 403-day expedition at Bharathi, India's Antarctic research station, in December 2018. Mani, who aged 56 at that time was the sole female on this team. She was part of a 23-person expedition crew. She ran and maintained the ground station from which 10 of the 14 orbits would be visible from Bharathi.
