= Shah Alam Khan =

Indian industrialist

Nawab Shah Alam Khan
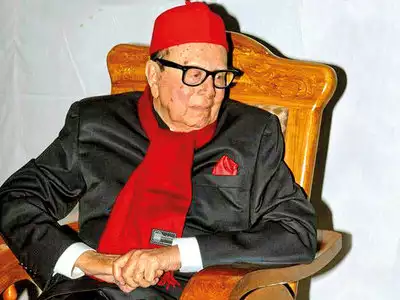
- Picture of Nawab Shah Alam Khan
- Occupations: Industrialist, Educationist
- Children: Seven sons, including Mehboob Alam Khan

Nawab Shah Alam Khan (1921-2017) was an Indian industrialist, educationist and cultural connoisseur from Hyderabad, India. The main commercial venture he ran was the Hyderabad Deccan Cigarette Factory. He was also the chairman of the Sultan ul Uloom Educational Society.

== Background and family ==
Shah Alam Khan was the son of Mir Khan (also known as Nawab Zabardast Khan) and belonged to an affluent Muslim family of Hyderabad state. Born in 1921, he grew up in an environment of wealth and privilege. However, he lost his father when he was a child, and his mother died when he was a teenager. His maternal uncle played a large role in raising him after the death of his father. At a young age, while he was still a college student, Shah Alam was married to Abida Khatoon, daughter of Mohammad Abdus Sattar, a successful tradesman turned industrialist who had founded the Hyderabad Deccan Cigarette Factory in 1921. Abdus Sattar had already died, and Abida, his only child and heir, was barely into her teens when they were married. Shah Alam Khan was favored by Abida's mother because he was well-educated and hailed from a respectable Nawabi family, but had little money or immediate family. The match was arranged by their families in the usual Hyderabadi way, and the marriage, which lasted all their lives, was harmonious. The couple had seven children, all boys, including Mehboob Alam Khan, who runs the Hyderabad Deccan Cigarette Factory and is a food connoisseur.

Not long after their wedding, Shah Alam Khan and Abida Khatoon had to adjust to change on a grand scale. The end of the British Raj, the extinguishing of the State of Hyderabad and the partition of India changed the society in which they lived.

== Career ==
Shah Alam Khan soon took charge of the cigarette factory, which had been faltering after the death of his father-in-law. Despite a challenging social situation, he nurtured the factory to unprecedented heights of success. The "Golconda" brand of cigarette was popular in India for several decades. It became a major money-spinner, and Shah Alam Khan, who was a sensible and even canny businessman despite his gentlemanly deportment, made intelligent investments in urban real estate, agricultural lands, a dairy farm and so on. Nevertheless, by the mid-1970s, the cigarette business was again faltering for several reasons. The tax regime was very unfavorable; cigarettes were now strongly discouraged by government and society alike. More importantly, multinational companies run by foreign-trained MBAs had changed the entire marketing paradigm of cigarettes and other consumer goods.

== Other interests ==
Shah Alam Khan was the chairman of the Sultan ul Uloom Educational Society. He was also a member of Board of Management and Academic Senate of Osmania University. He had other interests as well. He was the founder member of Hyderabad Rose Society and was known for his intimate knowledge about cultivation of roses. He had won many awards both nationally and internationally for his rose cultivars.

== Death ==
Shah Alam Khan died on 23 October 2017 aged 96. His mortal remains were laid to rest at the Masjid-e-Salima Khatoon in Himayatnagar at 5 pm the same day. He was survived by his wife, seven sons, and many grandchildren.
