= Fanna-Fi-Allah =

Canadian–American Qawwali group

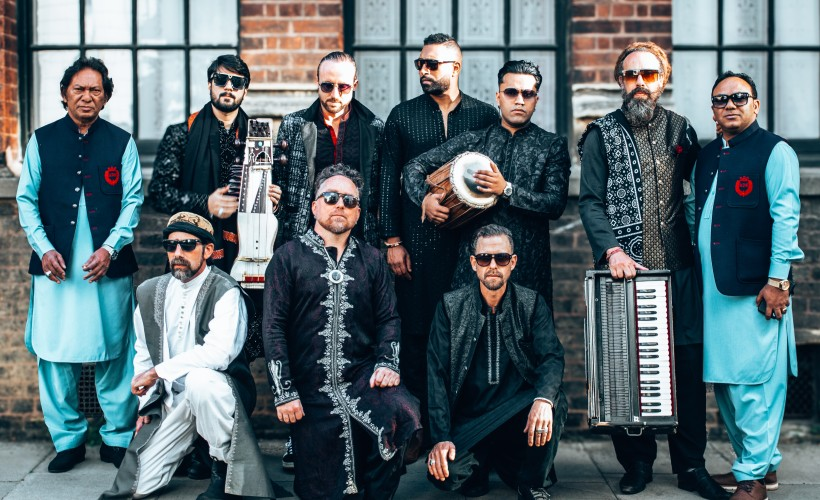
- Fanna-Fi-Allah Sufi Qawwali

Background information
- Origin: Canada; United States
- Genres: Qawwali; Sufi
- Years active: 1996–present
- Members: Tahir Faridi Qawwal; Kash Qalandar; Laali Qalandar; Salim Chishti; Ali Shan; Abrar Hussain; Chetan Ramlu
- Past members: Aminah Chishti Qawwal; Jahangir Baba
- Website: www.fanna-fi-allah.com

Fanna-Fi-Allah (Urdu: فنا فی الله) is a Canadian–American group which plays Qawwali, a form of Sufi devotional music popular in South Asia. Formed over two decades ago, the ensemble is recognized for its commitment to maintaining the authentic practices of Qawwali.

Through its performances, Fanna-Fi-Allah serves as a cultural bridge, sharing the spiritual and musical traditions of Sufi Qawwali with global audiences. The ensemble promotes themes of universal tolerance and spiritual connection, resonating with diverse audiences across different cultures.

Fanna-Fi-Allah has performed at notable international festivals and concert venues, with engagements in countries including the United States, Canada, Pakistan, China, Russia, various European nations, Australia, Indonesia, India, and parts of Africa. The group has played a significant role in introducing Qawwali music to a wider, international audience, fostering an appreciation for its rich cultural and spiritual significance.

== Origins ==
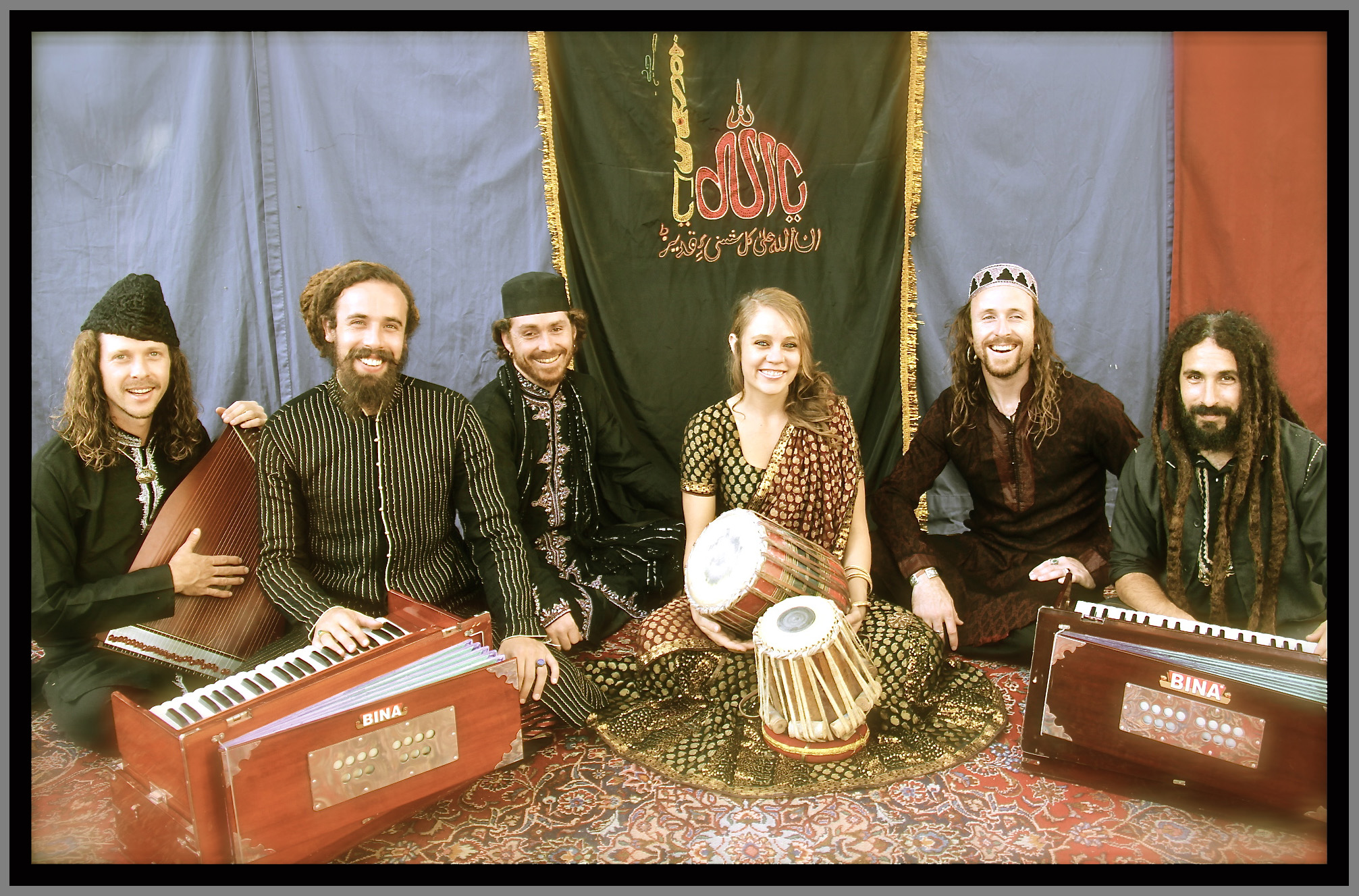
Fanna-Fi-Allah in its most iconic configuration (Ft. Aminah Chishti)

Group leader Tahir Faridi Qawwal (formerly Geoffrey Lyons), originally from Nova Scotia, studied Indian classical music with the tabla maestro Harjeet Sen Singh in India as a teenager. At 17, he converted to Islam and studied under qawwali masters Rahat Fateh Ali Khan, Pashupatinath Mishra, Sher Ali Khan and Muazzam Mujahid Ali Khan in Pakistan.

Aminah Chishti, also known as Jessica Ripper, hails from Ashland, Oregon. She is a student of renowned musicians Rahat Fateh Ali Khan, successor to Nusrat Fateh Ali Khan, and Ustad Dildar Hussain, who played with Nusrat for over 28 years. In 2003, she became the first female tabla player to be initiated into the Qawwali tradition. Her groundbreaking achievement challenged social norms and paved the way for women in the field of traditional South Asian music.

Qawwal and Chishti started Fanna-Fi-Allah Sufi Qawwali Ensemble in 2001.

== Recent ==
In 2022, Fanna-Fi-Allah and tabla player Aminah Chishti parted ways due to irreconcilable differences. Following this separation, Kash Qalandar (born Parkash Pal), a London-based musician and student of Ustad Tari Khan, joined Fanna-Fi-Allah as the new tabla nawaz. In addition to his tabla playing, Qalandar is also a vocalist in the group, contributing with his alaaps and giras.

After the COVID-19 pandemic, Fanna-Fi-Allah embarked on a World Tour in 2023, followed by successful tours across the USA, Canada, and the UK/Europe, bringing their unique Sufi Qawwali performances to global audiences.

In 2024, Chetan Ramlu, of Fijian Indian descent and born and raised in New Zealand, joined Fanna-Fi-Allah as the second harmonium player and vocalist, adding his unique cultural background and musical talents to the ensemble.

Ustad Dildar Hussain performed as both a vocalist and tabla player in several concerts with Fanna-Fi-Allah during their UK tour in June 2024. The tour culminated in an epic dhamaal (tabla solo) at the Union Chapel in London, showcasing his exceptional artistry alongside the ensemble.

== Members ==
- Tahir Faridi Qawwal – Vocals, Harmonium, Tabla
- Aminah Chishti Qawwal – Tabla, Vocals (former)
- Kash Qalandar
- Laali Qalandar – Vocals, Clapping
- Salim Chishti – Vocals, Clapping
- Ali Shan – Vocals, Clapping
- Jahangir Baba – Harmonium, Vocals (former)
- Chetan Ramlu - Harmonium, Vocals
- Abrar Hussain – Tabla, Vocals, Clapping
- Aziz Abbatiello – Whirling

== Discography ==
- Fanna-Fi-Allah (2018) Muraqaba (Released by Buda Musique France Recorded at Woodshed Studios Malibu courtesy of Chris Martin (Coldplay))
- Fanna-Fi-Allah (2017) – Live @ Great American Music Hall (Vinyl)
- Fanna-Fi-Allah Sufi Qawwali (2015)
- Fanna_Fi-Allah Sufi Qawwali tracks:
  - Man Kunto Maula (2014)
  - Mehfil-e-Sama Vol. 3 (2014)
  - Naubat Nagare (2013)
  - Ya Mustafa Nur-Ul-Khuda (2012)
- Fanna-Fi-Allah Sufi Qawwali Party
  - Mehfil-e-Sama Vol. 2 (2012)
  - Damahama Dam Ali Ali (2011)
  - Mehfil-e-Sama Vol. 1 (2008)
  - Baba Farid (2007)
  - Annihilation Into the Infinite (2005)
- Rizwan Muazzam
  - Amad (2014)
  - Araj Sun Li Jo Mori (2014)
  - Sufi Sama (2007)
- Rizwan Muazzam Qawwali
  - Karlo Ganj-e-Shakar (2011)
- Sher Ali Mehr Ali
  - Hamare Khwaja (2013)
- Tahir Qawwal
  - Alif Allah, Pt. 1 (2013)
  - Alif Allah, Pt. 2 (2013)
  - Alif Allah, Pt. 3 (2013)
  - Bhairavi Thumri (Ras Ke Bare Tore Nain) (2013)
- Temple Step
  - Alif Allah (Remix) (2014)
- Various Artists
  - Dayar-e-Ishq: Abode of Divine Love (2013)
