= Hyderabad Deccan Cigarette Factory =

Indian cigarette manufacturer

- Type: Private
- Industry: Tobacco
- Founded: 1930
- Founder: Janab Mohammad Abdus Sattar
- Brands: Golconda, Amar

Hyderabad Deccan Cigarette Factory is an Indian company which produces cigarettes. The factory is also known as Golconda Factory. The factory used to manufacture the popular Golconda brand and Amar brand of cigarettes. The road junction near the factory is called the Golconda X Roads.

== History ==
In 1930, Janab Mohammad Abdus Sattar, after leaving Vazir Sultan Tobacco Company, established the factory at Musheerabad.

In 1935, after Sattar died, his father-in-law took over the business and Begum Abeeda Khatoon, Sattar's only child, became the owner of the factory. She married Nawab Shah Alam Khan who joined the business in 1946 and ran it till his death in 2017.

The factory in its present form as a privately held company was incorporated in September 1972.

Since 1980s, the company has been a contract manufacturer of cigarettes for ITC Limited. Due to low sales, the company has been trying to diversify into other business areas such as real estate.
