= Lamakaan =

Cultural center in Banjara Hills, Hyderabad, India

Lamakaan (لامکاں)
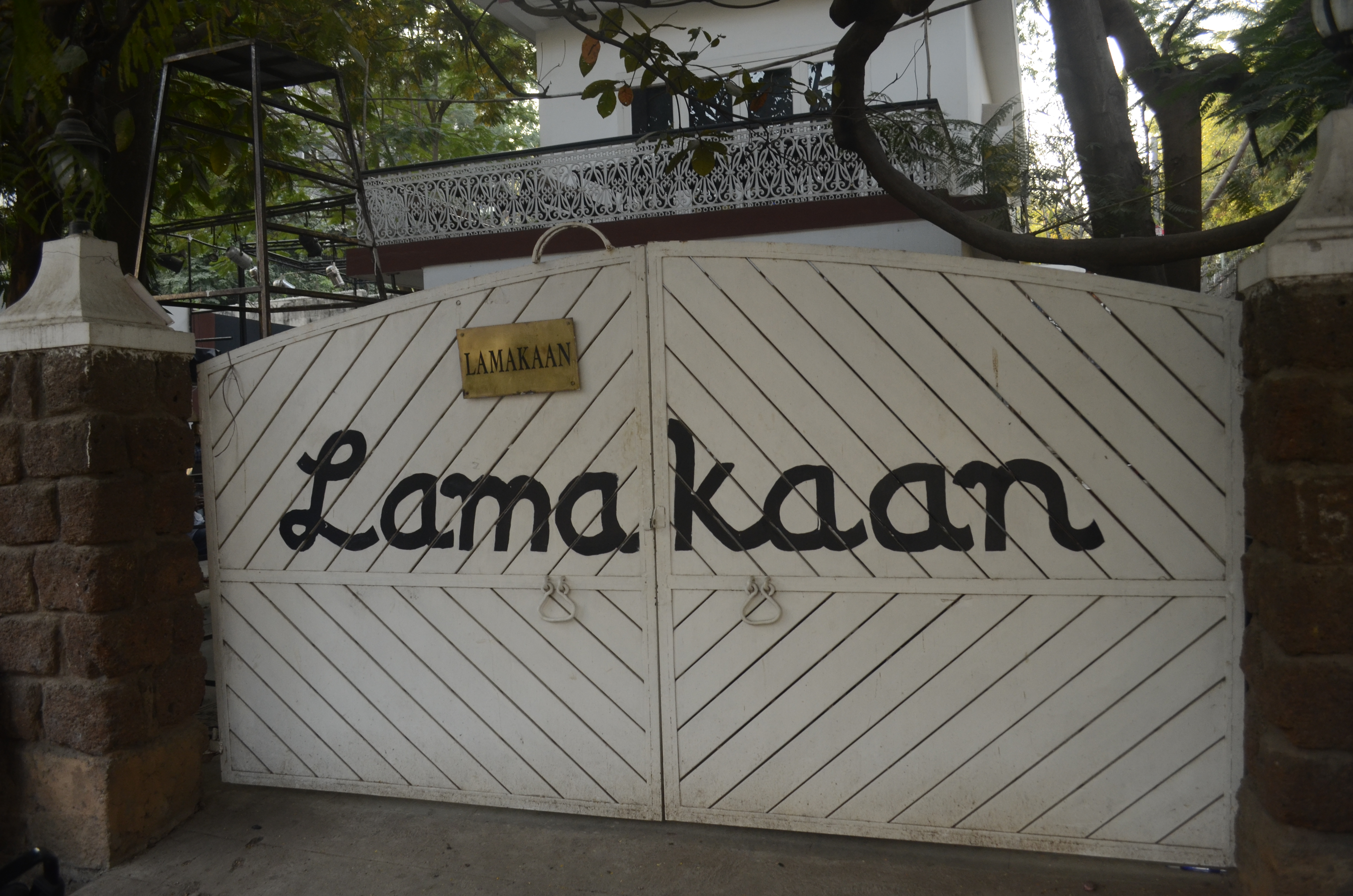
- Founded: March 2010
- Type: Cultural center
- Location: Road No. 1 Banjara Hills, Hyderabad, India
- Region served: Hyderabad
- Website: http://www.lamakaan.com/

Lamakaan (Urdu: لامکاں) is an open cultural center in Banjara Hills, Hyderabad, India. The non-profit organisation provides space for events such as arts, literature, theater, music, and debates.

== History ==
Lamakaan started hosting events in March 2010. It was founded by Ashhar Farhan, Humera Ahmed, Biju Mathew, and Elahe Hiptoola.

== The center ==
Vithal Rao performing at Lamakaan

Lamakaan hosts Pecha Kucha, concerts of famous artists like Warsi Brothers, Vittal Rao, Ateeq Hussain Khan among others. It conducts book releases, plays and seminars. It hosts events like Wikipedia Meetups. Theatre groups have performed at Lamakaan including Samahaara, Sutradhar, Manch Theatre, Nishumbita, Evam, Shudrka, Taher Ali Baig Productions and others.

== Closure threat ==
On 23 December 2015, a notice was issued to Lamakaan by the GHMC to shut down in three days, citing "creating nuisance to the surrounding residents and general public" as the reason. After notice, Lamakaan gave a reply to the civic body that was 'not satisfactory', to which the civic body responded by issuing a closure notice on 23 December. P. Mahender, the GHMC Deputy Commissioner (Circle 10), when contacted, said that there were traffic problems every Sunday in the lane but did not mention anything about the nuisance. One certain complaint was regarding women smoking on the premises.

The notice was withdrawn soon. Due to an uproar in the number of people protesting against shutting down Lamakaan and the signing of around 3,000 people on the online petitioning site change.org demanding the withdrawal of the notice, the attention of then-IT Minister K. T. Rama Rao was drawn. The issue was resolved after P. Mahender spoke with the owner of the place. The notice did not specify what was the cause of the nuisance but instead talked about the place running without a license. It was decided that the parking space of Jalagam Vengalarao Park would be used for four-wheeler parking.
