= Vithal Rao =

Pandit Vithal Rao
- Born: 1929
- Origin: Hyderabad, Telangana, India
- Died: 25 June 2015 (aged 85–86) Hyderabad
- Genre: Ghazals
- Occupation: singer
- Years active: 1920s – 2015

Vithal Rao Aatmaram Shivpurkar also known as Pandit Vithal Rao (1929 – 25 June 2015) was an Indian classical vocalist. He is considered to have been one of the last few maestros of 'Ghazals' and was the last court singer of the Last Nizam of Hyderabad. He is popular for singing ghazals written by Hyderabad writers, Urdu as well as Hindi ghazals.

== Early life ==
Vithal Rao Aatmaram Shivpurkar popularly known as Vithal Rao or Guruji was born in 1929 in Hyderabad, India.

== Performing career ==
Vithal Rao performing at Lamakaan, Hyderabad

Vithal Rao was a court musician of the Last Nizam of Hyderabad. He is popular with the noble families of Hyderabad. Among his notable accompanists include Ustad Sardar Khan (tabla).

Some of his notable disciples include Kiran Ahluwalia, playback and folk singer Rahul Sipligunj, and ghazal and qawwali singer Chetan Ramlu.

== Discography ==
Some his popular ghazals are:

- Ek chamele ke mandve tale
- Maine teri aaakho mein pada, sab bhool gaya bus yaad raha sirf Allah hi Allah (Sufiana Kalam)
- Aye mere ham nasheen
- Nindiya Na Aaye
- O Sitamgar Tera Muskurana Kaam Aane Ke Qabil Nahin Hai
- Zehal-e miskin makun taghaful, duraye naina banaye batiyan
- Ghazals of Janab Sayeed Shaheedi
