= Bairu Raghuram =

Indian painter (born 1949)

- Born: 1949 (age 76–77); Hyderabad, India
- Known for: Painting

Bairu Raghuram (born 1949) is an Indian painter. His depictions are simple, rural life and woman in their daily life. He is mostly inspired by the tranquillity of rural Telangana.

== Early life ==
Bairu Raghuram was born in Hyderabad, India.

He did his Bachelor of Arts from Osmania University and then continued to finish his Diploma in Drawing and Painting from I.F.A.I. Gulbarga, Karnataka.

== Career ==
Bairu Raghuram worked as a freelancer for weekly and monthly magazines.

He travels to districts like Karimnagar, Warangal and Nizamabad to paint.

== Awards ==
- Bharat Kala Parishad (1981 & 1985)
- Gold medal from Hyderabad Art Society (1983,1987 & 1996)
- National Academi Award (1997)
