= Sunitha Krishnan =

Indian social activist

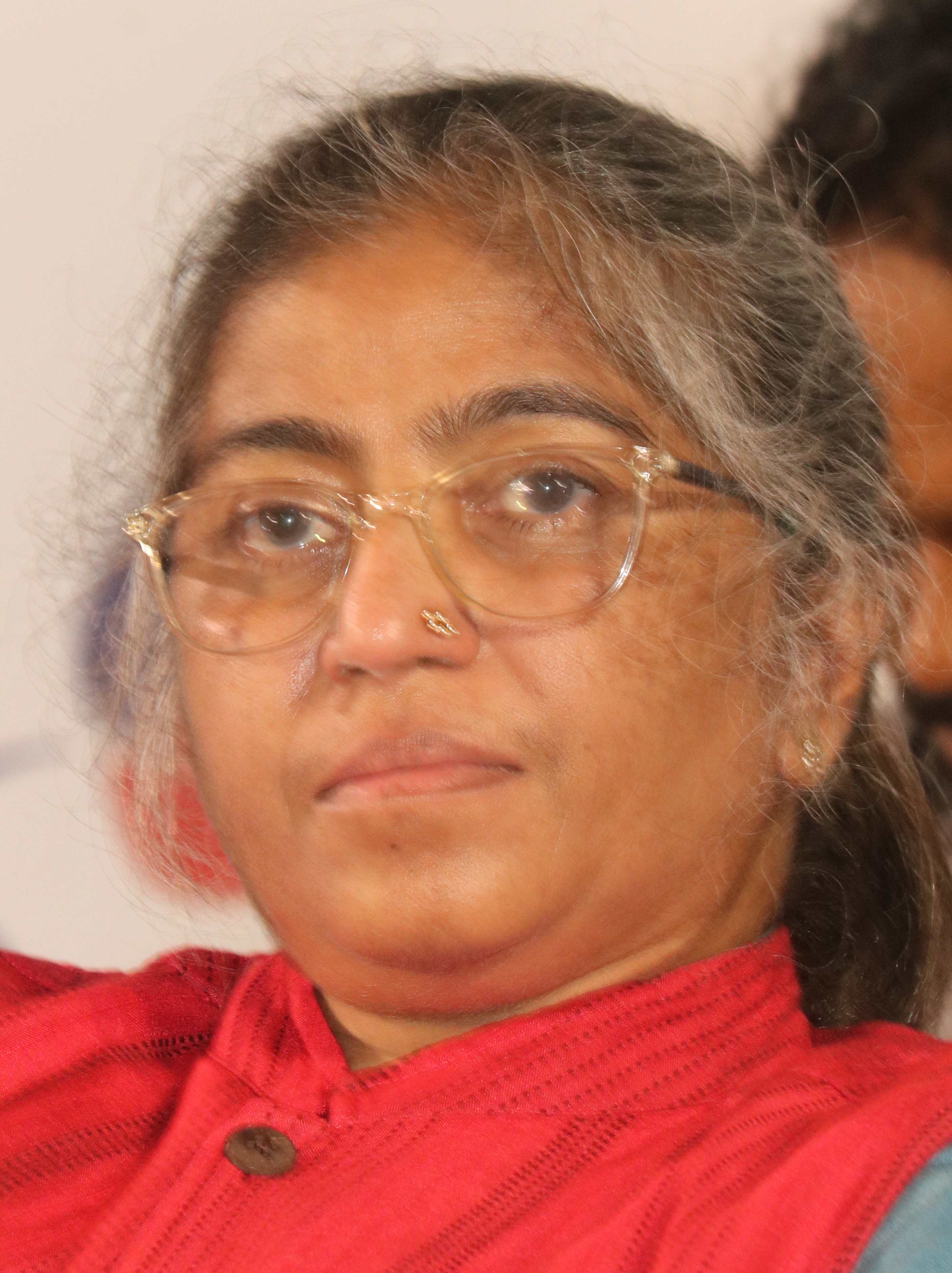
- Krishnan in 2025
- Born: 1972 (age 53–54); Bangalore, India
- Education: St. Joseph's College, Bangalore, Roshini Nilaya
- Occupations: Founder of Prajwala, Hyderabad
- Known for: Social activism
- Spouse: Rajesh Touchriver

Sunitha Krishnan (born 1972) is an Indian social activist and chief functionary and co-founder of Prajwala, a non-governmental organization that rescues, rehabilitates and reintegrates sex-trafficked victims into society. She was awarded India's fourth highest civilian award the Padma Shri in 2016.

== Early life ==
Krishnan was born in Bangalore, to Palakkad Malayali parents Raju Krishnan and Nalini Krishnan. She saw most of the country early on while traveling from one place to another with her father, who worked with the Department of Survey which makes maps for the entire country.

Krishnan's passion for social work became manifested when, at the age of eight years, she started teaching dance to mentally challenged children. By the age of twelve, she was running schools in slums for underprivileged children. At the age of fifteen, while working on a neo-literacy campaign for the Dalit community, Krishnan was gang raped by eight men. They did not like that a woman was interfering with what they claimed as “man’s society.” They beat her so badly that she is partially deaf in one ear. This incident served as the impetus for what she does today.

Krishnan studied in Central Government Schools in Bangalore and Bhutan. After obtaining a bachelor's degree in environmental sciences from St. Joseph's College in Bangalore, Krishnan completed her MSW (medical and psychiatric) at the School of Social Work Roshni Nilaya, Mangalore.

== Career ==
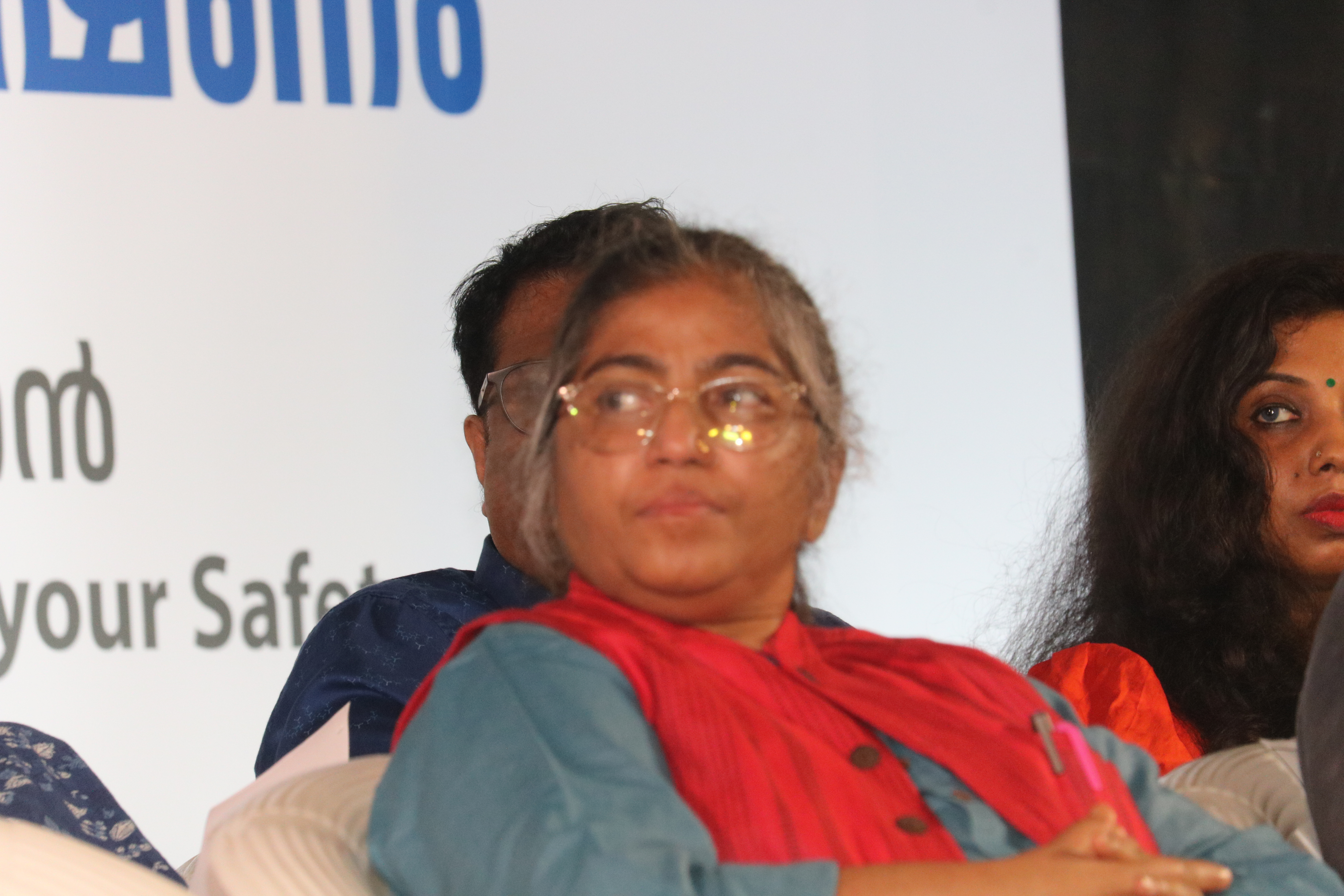
Sunitha Krishnan attending DC books 51st Anniversary at Kollam 2025

Krishnan decided to move to Hyderabad, to join PIN as the Coordinator for the program for young women. Krishnan soon became involved with the housing problems of slum dwellers. When the homes of people living by the city's Musi River were slated to be bulldozed for a "beautification" project, she joined the housing rights campaign of PIN, organized protests and stalled the scheme.It was in Hyderabad that she met Brother Jose Vetticatil, who was then Director of Boys’ Town, a Catholic Institution run by the Montfort Brothers of St. Gabriel, that rehabilitated and trained young people at risk by providing them vocational skills that fetched them handsome jobs in India and abroad This was in 1996.

=== Prajwala ===
In 1996, sex workers living in Mehboob ki Mehandi, a red light area in Hyderabad, were evacuated. As a result, thousands of women, who were caught in the clutches of prostitution, were left homeless. Having found a like-minded person in Brother Jose Vetticatil, a missionary, Krishnan started a transition school at the vacated brothel to prevent the second generation from being trafficked. In its early years, Krishnan had to sell her jewelry and even most of her household utensils to make ends meet at Prajwala.

Today, Prajwala stands upon five pillars: prevention, rescue, rehabilitation, reintegration and advocacy. The organization extends moral, financial, legal and social support to victims and ensures that perpetrators are brought to justice. To date, Prajwala has rescued, rehabilitated, or served over 28,600 survivors of sex trafficking, and the scale of their operations makes them the largest anti-trafficking shelter in the world.

The warehouse of energy and optimism that she is, Ms. Krishnan's enthusiasm easily rubs off on those around her as well. As a former co-worker, says, "Working with Sunitha is like a constant learning experience, with her constantly throwing challenges, urging staff to tap their potential. She not only monitors but also mentors her staff in all spheres of work and life. Her undying hope, passion, relentless struggle to reach goals set for herself and for Prajwala (actually synonymous) inspires the team to stay focused on the cause too."

The organization's "second-generation" prevention program operates in 17 transition centers and has helped prevent thousands of children of prostituted mothers from entering the flesh trade. Prajwala also operates a shelter home for rescued children and adult victims of sex trafficking, many of whom are HIV positive. Krishnan not only leads these interventions, but has also spearheaded an economic rehabilitation program which trains survivors in carpentry, welding, printing, masonry and housekeeping.

Prajwala has over 200 employees, but Krishnan runs the organization as a full-time volunteer—a decision she took very early in her life. She supports herself, with help from her husband, by writing books and giving speeches and seminars on trafficking worldwide. She is married to Mr. Rajesh Touchriver, an Indian filmmaker, art director and scriptwriter, who has made several films in collaboration with Prajwala. One of the films, Anamika, is now a part of the curricula of the National Police Academy, while another Naa Bangaaru Talli won 3 National Awards in 2014.

=== Social policy ===
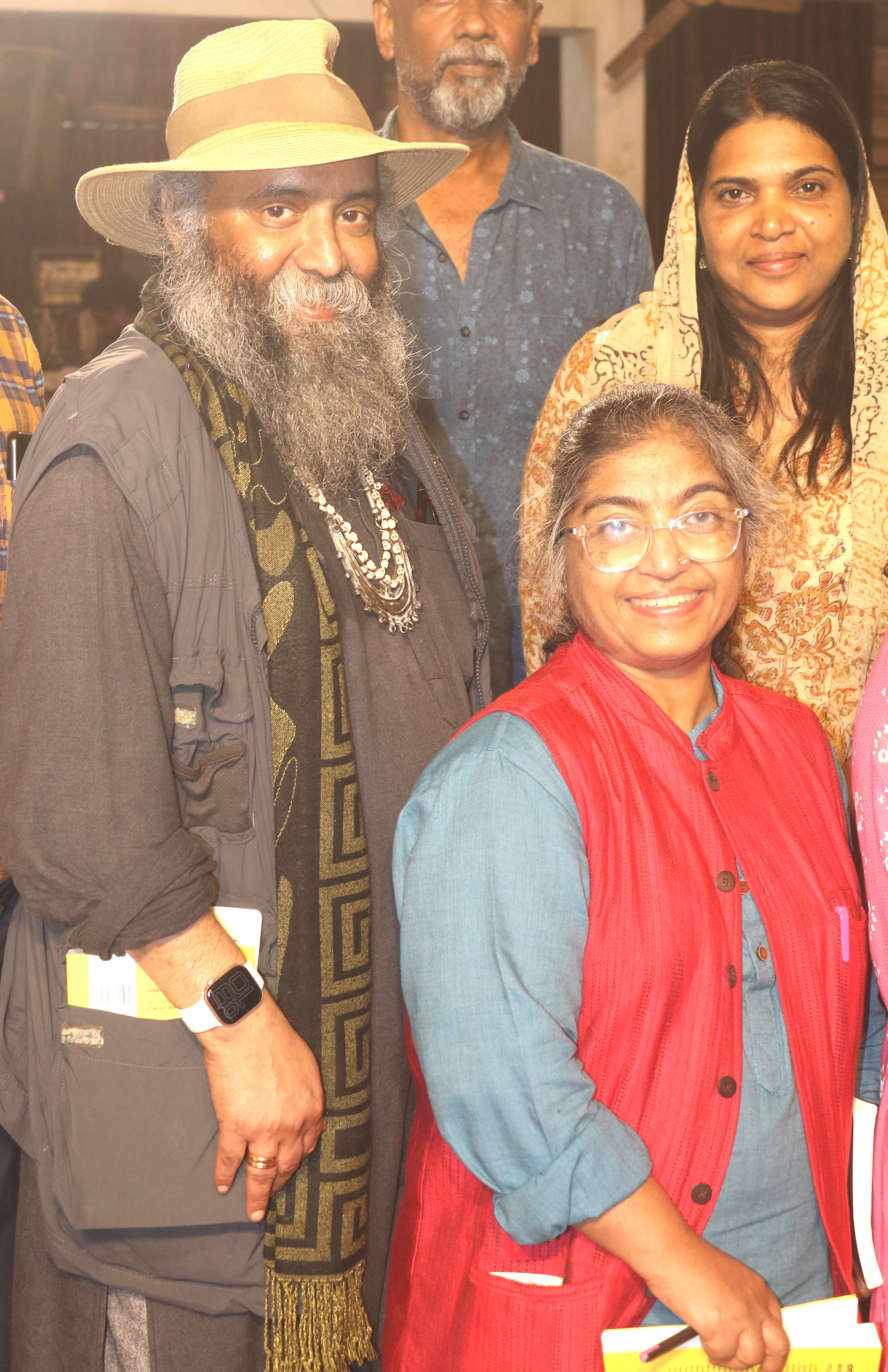
Sunitha Krishnan and Husband, Rajesh Touchriver

In 2003, Krishnan drafted recommendations for rehabilitation of victims of sex trafficking in Andhra Pradesh, which were passed by the State Government as a Policy for Rescue & Rehabilitation of Victims of Trafficking for commercial sexual exploitation vide GO MS 1.

Ms. Krishnan was appointed as advisor for the Government of Kerala's Nirbhaya policy for Women and Children to fight sexual violence and trafficking in 2011. The scheme, which was originally drafted by Krishnan, is coordinated by various government departments like social welfare, SC/ST, police, health, labor and local self-government in collaboration with NGOs. However, she resigned from this advisory position on 4 August 2014, expressing anguish and frustration at the lack of political will to implement the Nirbhaya policy. In March 2015, in a "move of repentance" the government re-inducted Sunitha Krishnan back to its Nirbhaya scheme by giving her more decision-making power through the role of Honorary Director.

In the United States, Ms. Krishnan has met auditoriums full of students in order to raise awareness, warn them against getting involved in the industry and inspire new activism. Not only did she spearhead the first ever Statewide Campaign against Sex Trafficking targeting adolescent girls in collaboration with the State government and various international funding agencies, but she also launched the Men Against Demand campaign with the slogan "Real Men Don’t Buy Sex" which has reached 1.8 billion people worldwide.

She was also appointed as a member of the Andhra Pradesh State Women's Commission and contributed to India's new Bill on Rape, which was passed in Parliament in 2013 to increase punitive measures for sexual violence and assault.

=== Legal advocacy ===
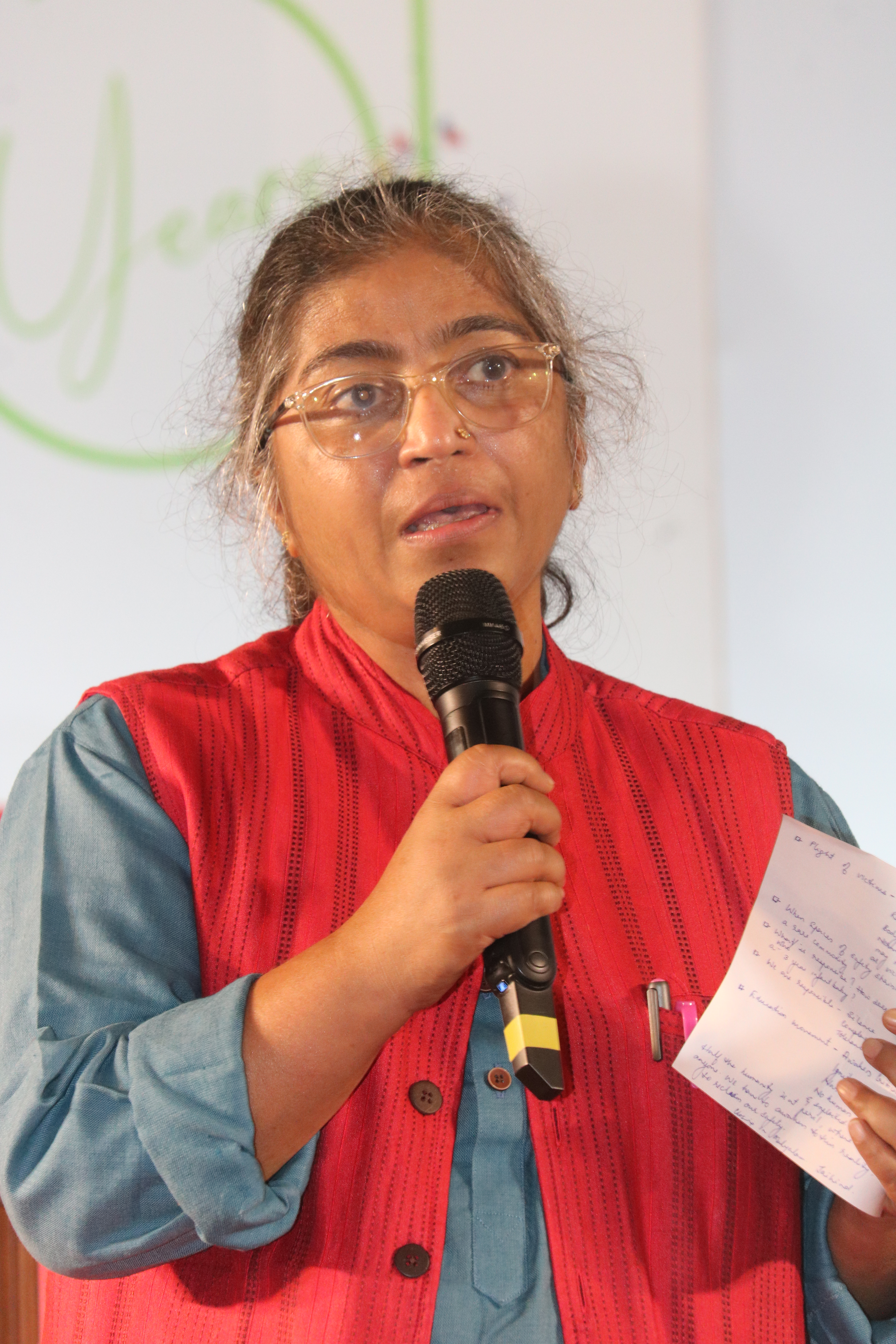

With personal experience in many raids, Krishnan has realized that without a meaningful state policy, no amount of social work or activism at the micro-level is enough to be helpful. She therefore goes about her task forging partnerships with various police departments, especially Women Protection Cell, the Anti Human Trafficking Unit. Krishnan started the first ever Crises Counseling Centre in Afzalgunj Police Station–a pilot project for Police-NGO collaboration to intercept sex trafficking. She has persuaded the Andhra Pradesh government to work with her in cracking down on this organized crime and helped secure the conviction of more than 150 traffickers.

Krishnan has also conducted sensitization workshops for thousands of senior police officers, judges, prosecutors and Child Welfare Committee members to equip them with the requisite understanding and skills to effectively handle cases of human trafficking and advocate for child-friendly courts. As a result, police personnel ranking from Superintendents to Sub Inspectors have been trained on how to combat the crime and address the psycho-social needs of victims during and after rescue.

In 2015, after the #ShameTheRapist campaign, the landlord gave an ultimatum to shift her Falaknuma, Hyderabad-based Economic Rehabilitation Unit. With limited time and resources available, Krishnan chose to crowdfund the funding gap required to relocate to her new facility. She crowdfunded over $225000 on crowdfunding platform called goCrowdera.com to bridge the funding gap and to build an Emergency Shelter for the rescued victims.

=== Media outreach ===
In 2009, Krishnan gave a speech during an official TED India conference about the cause of human trafficking at Infosys Campus, Mysore, which has since inspired over 2.5 million viewers globally.

"She brought the house down in Mysore today. And by that, I mean that she broke hearts and moved people to action. The audience listened painfully to some of the stories of the more than 3,200 girls she has rescued, girls who had endured unimaginable torture and yet, somehow, nevertheless found the will to heal and thrive… Her strong voice and powerful body language ensured that no one could claim to have misunderstood her points."

Her July 2012 appearance on Aamir Khan’s television show Satyamev Jayate was instrumental in not only garnering huge funds but also networking with business owners willing to provide job placements for survivors. She also appeared on test open at Open Heart with RK which reached out to millions of Telugu viewers across the world. In addition, Krishnan sensitized over 3,000 corporate houses through the INK and The Indus Entrepreneurs (TiE) conferences, which made a deep impact on the attendees.

=== Film making ===
Early in her career, Krishnan forayed into film making as a tool for advocacy. She conceptualized and scripted 14 documentary films on socially relevant issues such as youth and HIV/AIDS, Sheikh marriages, incest, prostitution, sex trafficking, communal riots, among others. Some of the films she has helped develop and co-produce include:

- Mein Aur Meri Sanchaien (Hindi)
- Needalu: An Insider’s view into the World’s Largest Criminal Enterprise
- The Man, His Mission (20 mins, Hindi)
- Bhagnagar (10 mins, Hindi)
- On Freedom and Fear (30 mins, Telugu, English)
- The Sacred Face
- Me & Us (23 mins, English)
- Astha – An Ode to Life (25 mins, English)
- A Chance to Live (25 mins, English)
- Anamika–The Nameless (28 mins, Telugu, Hindi)
- Building Bridges
- Aparajita
- Naa Bangaaru Talli (4 National awards)

The 2005 documentary Anamika—The Nameless won the AC award under "Best Foreign Award" category, Best Editing from Festival Cine de Granada and Best Documentary Film Award at the HIFF. Prajwala's shockingly vivid film The Sacred Face also broke the silence about the horrors of incest among high-level officials in Hyderabad.

In January 2013, Ms. Krishnan in collaboration with Suntouch Productions launched a bilingual feature film on sex trafficking titled Ente in Malayalam and Naa Bangaaru Talli in Telugu. Naa Bangaru Talli has won 5 international awards in 2013, including Best Feature Film Award at Trinity International Film Festival, USA and Award of Excellence from IFFCRM, Indonesia. It then won 3 awards at the 61st National Film awards in New Delhi and was screened at the 4th Beijing International Film Festival, 2014.

=== Research and publications ===
In 2002, Krishnan and Bro Jose Vetticatil conducted an action research and publication of a document entitled The Shattered Innocence on inter-state trafficking from Andhra Pradesh to other states, revealing the reality and magnitude of the crime along with a demographic profile of vulnerable communities. Upon submitting this report to the government, a state-level consultation on the need for a multi-sectoral approach to address the issue emerged.

Other books she has published include:

- Caregiver's Manual on Sex Trafficking: A guide to creating a healing space to restore dignity for victims
- From Despair to Hope: A Handbook for HIV/AIDS Counselors
- Living Positively: A series of 8 resource guides for barefoot HIV counselors on community-based care & support
- Handbook for Anti-Trafficking Partners of Andhra Pradesh: A State Resource Directory of Service Providers

== Threats and attacks ==
Krishnan has been physically assaulted 14 times and she receives regular death threats. She says that a Sumo van once deliberately rammed her auto rickshaw, but she escaped serious injury. She was again fortunate to escape injury when acid was once flung at her. Good fortune saved her a third time when she was the target of a poisoning attempt. Krishnan says that these assaults have only steeled her resolve to carry on her crusade against human trafficking.

In 2012, an RTI activist led an attack on one of Prajwala's transition centers in Kalapather. A mob of young Muslims with posters and printouts of Prajwala's website staged a dharna in front of its school. The media picked up the story, presenting one-sided information, insinuating that Prajwala had been defaming Muslim women in order to access foreign funds. Hundreds of Muslims came to attack the centre with swords, chains and stones. Their leader declared loudly that he would kill Krishnan and "cut her into pieces". He also threatened to close all her other centers.

== Awards and honors ==
=== 2016–2018 ===
- India Times listed Krishnan as one of the 11 Human Rights Activists Whose Life Mission Is To Provide Others With A Dignified Life
- Padma Shri in the field of Social Work, 2016.
- Inaugural Sri Sathya Sai Award for Human Excellence, 2016.
- Tallberg Global Leadership Prize
- Franco-German Award For Human Rights & Rule of law

=== 2013-2015 ===
- 24th Yudhvir Foundation Memorial Award, 2015.
- Mother Teresa Awards for Social Justice, 2014.
- CIVICUS Innovation Award, 2014.
- Kairali Ananthapuri Award, Muscat, 2014.
- People of the Year award from LIMCA Book of Records, 2014.
- Woman of Substance Award, Rotary Club Mumbai, 2014.
- Anita Parekh Award For Women's Empowerment, Rotary Club Mumbai, 2013.
- Rotary Social Consciousness Award & Paul Harris Fellowship, Rotary Club Mumbai, 2013.
- Godfrey Phillips National Amodini Award, 2013.
- Living Legends Award from Human Symphony Foundation, 2013.
- Mahila Thilakam Award, Government of Kerala, 2013.
- DVF Exemplary Woman Award, Dianne Von Furstenberg Foundation, 2013.
- Outstanding Woman Award, National Commission for Women, 2013.

=== 2011–2012 ===
- Akrithi Woman of the Year, Rotary Club Coimbatore, 2012.
- IRDS Safdar Hashmi award for Human Rights, 2012.
- Women in Excellence Award, SHE Foundation, 2012.
- Outstanding Social Work Award, Government of Kerala, 2012.
- John Jay College of Criminal Justice International Leadership Award, New York, 2011.
- N Joseph Mundaserry Award for Outstanding Social Work, Qatar, 2011.
- Aakruthi Woman of the Year Award, Rotary International, 2011.
- G8 Woman Award, Colors TV, 2011.
- Indiavision Person of the Year Award, Indiavision TV Channel, 2011.
- Human Rights Award, Vital Voices Global Partnership, Washington DC, 2011.
- Garshom Pravasi Vanitha Award 2011, Kuwait

=== 2002–2010 ===
- Tejaswini Award, FICCI, 2010.
- Kelvinator Woman Power Award, Colors TV, 2010.
- Gangadhar Humanitarian Award, Kerala, 2010.
- Vanitha Women of the Year, Manorama Publications, 2009.
- Trafficking in Persons (TIP) Report Heroes from US Department of State, 2009.
- CNN-IBN Real Hero Award, Reliance Foundation, 2008.
- Perdita Huston International Award for Human Rights, United Nations of Capital Hill, Washington DC, 2006.
- Citation from Governor of Andhra Pradesh for Contribution to Women's Empowerment, 2004.
- Stree Shakti Puraskar, Government of India, 2003.
- Ashoka Fellowship, 2002.

Malayalam movie director Vineeth Sreenivasan was inspired by her life while developing the story of his latest movie Thira.
