= Anjali Parvati Koda =

Indian writer

== Biography ==
Anjali Parvati Koda is a playwright, a writer-director in Telugu films, and a stand-up comedian. She has acted in plays such as Hamlet and Anton Chekov's The Bear.

Anjali Parvati Koda
- Born: Hyderabad, Telangana, India
- Occupations: Director, Writer, Playwright
- Years active: 2004–Present

== Theatre ==
- The Importance of Being Earnest by Oscar Wilde (English) (Producer)
- Court Martial by Swadesh Deepak (Hindi) (Producer)
- The Bear by Anton Chekhov (English) (Actor)
- The Proposal by Anton Chekhov (English) (Producer)
- Hamlet by William Shakespeare (English) (Actor)
- Dominic Wesley by Anjali Parvati Koda (English) (Writer)
- The Zoo Story by Edward Albee (English) (Producer)
- Purushotham by Anjali Parvati Koda (English) (Writer)
- The Crest of the Peacock by Sarada Devi (English) (Actor-Dancer)
- Maranoparanth by Surendra Varma (Hindi) (Actor)
- Taj Mahal Ka Tender by Ajay Shukla (Hindi) (Producer)
- Karna by Anjali Parvati Koda (English) (Writer)
- 12 Angry Men by Reginald Rose (English) (Producer)
- Gregor Samsa by Anjali Parvati Koda (English) (Writer)
- The Good Doctor by Neil Simon (English) (Producer)
- Farewell by Team Samahaara (Multilingual) (Producer)
- The Last Wish Baby Adapted by Anjali Parvati Koda and Team Samahaara (Multilingual) (Writer-Editor)
