= List of shipwrecks in July 1945 =

The list of shipwrecks in July 1945 includes ships sunk, foundered, grounded, or otherwise lost during July 1945.

== 1 July ==
List of shipwrecks: 1 July 1945
Ship	State	Description
CD-72	Imperial Japanese Navy	World War II: The Type D escort ship was torpedoed and sunk in the Yellow Sea west of the Changshan Islands (38°08′N 124°38′E) by USS Haddo (United States Navy).
Konri Maru	Japan	World War II: The cargo ship (a.k.a. Konri Go) was torpedoed and sunk in the Yellow Sea west of the Changshan Islands (38°08′N 124°38′E) by USS Haddo (United States Navy). Six passengers, eight guards and seventeen crew were killed.
R-224	Germany	The Type R-218 minesweeper was sunk by an explosion in the Kattegat.
Taiun Maru No.1	Japan	World War II: The cargo ship (a.k.a. Daiun Maru No.1) was torpedoed and sunk in the Yellow Sea west of the Changshan Islands (38°08′N 124°38′E) by USS Haddo (United States Navy). Eight crew were killed.
Taiun Maru No.2	Japan	World War II: The cargo ship (a.k.a. Daiun Maru No.2 and Shinneisho Go) was torpedoed and sunk in the Yellow Sea west of the Changshan Islands (38°08′N 124°38′E) by USS Haddo (United States Navy). Two crew were killed.

== 2 July ==
List of shipwrecks: 2 July 1945
Ship	State	Description
CHa-188	Imperial Japanese Navy	World War II: The CHa-1-class auxiliary submarine chaser was sunk off Mutsure Island by mines.
Emeraude	Belgium	The cargo ship struck the submerged wreck of Empire Path (United Kingdom) and sank in the English Channel, 8 nautical miles (15 km) off Ostend, West Flanders, Belgium. The wreck was dispersed in 1960.
Empire Fal	United Kingdom	The cargo ship (4,806 GRT, 1914) was scuttled in the Atlantic Ocean (58°00′09″N 11°00′00″W) with a cargo of Italian gas bombs.

== 3 July ==
List of shipwrecks: 3 July 1945
Ship	State	Description
Hoei Maru	Japan	World War II: The cargo ship was sunk by naval mine dropped by aircraft near Jindo Island (34°22′N 126°25′E). Eight crew and 280 passengers were killed. Another source says there were around 40 survivors of the more than 500 people aboard.

== 4 July ==
List of shipwrecks: 4 July 1945
Ship	State	Description
Bahia	Brazilian Navy	The Bahia-class cruiser was accidentally sunk during gunnery practice when her own guns hit depth charges at the stern of the ship with the loss of most of her crew.
HMS Elizabeth Therese	Royal Navy	The naval drifter (156 GRT, 1934) was lost on this date.
Koshe Maru	Imperial Japanese Navy	World War II: The patrol boat was torpedoed and sunk in the Pacific Ocean west of Kyushu by USS Tirante (United States Navy).
Mashuye Maru	Imperial Japanese Navy	World War II: The patrol boat was torpedoed and sunk in the Pacific Ocean west of Kyushu by USS Tirante (United States Navy).
Pa-177 and Pa-178	Japan	World War II: The incomplete Pa-1-class patrol ships were bombed and destroyed while under construction at Tokushima.
Toshin Maru No. 5 Go	Imperial Japanese Navy	World War II: The auxiliary minesweeper was sunk off Haha Jima, by aircraft from Task Force 38.

== 5 July ==
List of shipwrecks: 5 July 1945
Ship	State	Description
CHa-37	Imperial Japanese Navy	World War II: The CHa-1-class auxiliary submarine chaser was sunk in the Bali Sea off Bali, Netherlands East Indies (08°10′S 114°50′E) by USS Lizardfish (United States Navy).
Sapporo Maru No. 11	Japan	World War II: The cargo ship was torpedoed and sunk in the Pacific Ocean off the Kuril Islands by USS Barb (United States Navy). Four crewmen were killed.
Toyokawa Maru	Imperial Japanese Navy	World War II: The Toyokawa Maru-class auxiliary transport was sunk off Shimonoseki, near Mutsure Jima, Japan (33°56′N 130°53′E) by an aerial mine dropped by United States Boeing B-29 Superfortress heavy bomber aircraft. Three crewmen and 84 passengers were killed.
V 5311 Seeotter	Deutscher Minenräumdienst	World War II: The Polarstern-class Vorpostenboot struck a mine and sank off "Gejta", Norway with the loss of 23 of her crew.

== 6 July ==
List of shipwrecks: 6 July 1945
Ship	State	Description
Annette Fritzen	Japan	World War II: The cargo ship struck a mine off Pusan, Korea (35°N 128°E), and sank.
CHa-153	Imperial Japanese Navy	World War II: The CHa-1-class auxiliary submarine chaser was sunk off Niigata Harbour by mines.
Toyo Maru	Japan	World War II: The merchant cable ship was sunk by a naval mine 73 miles (117 km) northeast of Tobigasuhana, Japan. Five crew were killed.

== 7 July ==
List of shipwrecks: 7 July 1945
Ship	State	Description
CHa-59	Imperial Japanese Navy	World War II: The CHa-1-class auxiliary submarine chaser was sunk off Singapore.
Koun Maru No.2	Japan	World War II: The merchant cargo ship was torpedoed and sunk by USS Tirante (United States Navy) east of Japan (42°21′N 141°28′E). 17 crew were killed.

== 8 July ==
List of shipwrecks: 8 July 1945
Ship	State	Description
CHa-50	Imperial Japanese Navy	World War II: The CHa-1-class auxiliary submarine chaser was torpedoed and sunk east of Singapore by the submarine USS Bluefish (United States Navy).
CHa-85	Imperial Japanese Navy	World War II: The CHa-1-class auxiliary submarine chaser was sunk in Shaisu Strait, Korea (33°50′N 126°42′E) by the submarine USS Sea Robin (United States Navy).
Koun Maru No. 2	Japan	World War II: The coaster was torpedoed and sunk in the Pacific Ocean south of Honshu by the submarine USS Trepang (United States Navy).
HMS La Nantaise	Royal Navy	The naval trawler (399 or 359 GRT, 1933) collided with Helen Crest (United Kingdom) and sank in the North Sea near the Goodwin Lightship (United Kingdom) off the coast of Kent with the loss of 11 of her 25 crew. The tug Empire Henchman (United Kingdom) rescued the survivors.
HNLMS O 19	Royal Netherlands Navy	O 19 aground World War II: The O 19-class submarine ran aground on Ladd Reef in the South China Sea (08°40′N 111°40′E). On 10 July, she was scuttled by her crew with scuttling charges, and shelled and torpedoed by USS Cod (United States Navy) to prevent her capture by the Japanese. USS Cod took her crew to Australia.
Saitsu Maru	Japan	World War II: The cargo ship was torpedoed and sunk in the Pacific Ocean west of Honshu by the submarine USS Tirante (United States Navy).

== 9 July ==
List of shipwrecks: 9 July 1945
Ship	State	Description
CHa-50	Imperial Japanese Navy	World War II: The CHa-1-class auxiliary submarine chaser was sunk east of Malaya (02°13′N 105°03′E) by USS Bluefish (United States Navy).
USS YMS-84	United States Navy	World War II: Battle of Balikpapan: The YMS-1-class minesweeper struck a mine and sank off Balikpapan, Borneo (1°19′S 116°48′E).

== 10 July ==
List of shipwrecks: 10 July 1945
Ship	State	Description
Fanny	Norway	World War II: The fishing vessel struck a mine and sank in Varangerfjord, Norway with the loss of two crew.
Fumi Maru No. 6	Japan	World War II: The whaler was torpedoed and sunk in the Pacific Ocean east of Honshu by USS Moray (United States Navy).
HMT Kurd	Royal Navy	World War II: The naval trawler (352 GRT, 1930) struck a mine and sank in the English Channel off The Lizard, Cornwall with the loss of 15 crew and her Captain. Eleven survivors rescued by HMT Almandine (Royal Navy).
Nanmei Maru No. 5	Japan	World War II: The coastal tanker was torpedoed and sunk in the Gulf of Thailand by USS Hammerhead (United States Navy).
Sakura Maru	Japan	World War II: The coastal tanker was torpedoed and sunk in the Gulf of Thailand by USS Hammerhead (United States Navy).
USS SC-521	United States Navy	The SC-497-class submarine chaser foundered in the Coral Sea off the Santa Cruz Islands (11°03′S 164°50′E).
Shikishima Maru	Japan	World War II: The cargo ship was torpedoed and sunk in the Yellow Sea by USS Sea Robin (United States Navy).
Toyo Maru	Japan	World War II: The cargo ship was torpedoed and sunk in the Pacific Ocean off the Kuril Islands by USS Barb (United States Navy).
W-27	Imperial Japanese Navy	World War II: The W-19-class minesweeper was torpedoed and sunk off Yamada Bay, Honshu (39°20′N 142°07′E) by USS Runner (United States Navy).
Wakamiya Maru	Imperial Japanese Navy	World War II: The Wakamiya Maru-class auxiliary netlayer was sunk, possibly while still stranded, by Allied aircraft near Qian Lu lighthouse off Kirun, Taiwan with the loss of two crewmen.

== 11 July ==
List of shipwrecks: 11 July 1945
Ship	State	Description
Inari Maru	Japan	World War II: The fishing vessel was sunk in the Pacific Ocean east of Honshu by USS Kingsfish (United States Navy).
Sakura	Imperial Japanese Navy	World War II: The Matsu-class destroyer struck a mine in Osaka Harbour (39°20′N 142°07′E) detonating the aft magazine, severing the stern, and sinking her. One hundred and thirty crew, including her captain, were killed.
Seiho Maru No. 15	Imperial Japanese Navy	World War II: The guard boat was sunk in the Pacific Ocean off Hokkaido (44°03′N 146°30′E) by USS Barb (United States Navy).
Takechi Maru No. 3	Japan	World War II: The cargo ship struck a mine near Shodo Jima and sank.
Typhoon	United States	The 8-gross register ton, 31-foot (9.4 m) motor vessel was wrecked in South Inian Pass (58°13′30″N 136°10′00″W) in Southeast Alaska.
Unknown	Empire of Japan	World War II: A diesel commercial sampan was sunk in the Pacific Ocean off Hokkaido (44°03′N 146°30′E) by USS Barb (United States Navy).

== 12 July ==
List of shipwrecks: 12 July 1945
Ship	State	Description
Gibel Kebir	United Kingdom	The cargo ship (551 GRT, 1887) sank whilst under repair at Port Said, Egypt. She was later raised and scrapped.
Mitu Maru	Japan	World War II: The tanker struck a mine and sank in the Pacific Ocean (33°38′N 135°03′E).

== 13 July ==
List of shipwrecks: 13 July 1945
Ship	State	Description
CD-219	Imperial Japanese Navy	World War II: The Type C escort ship was torpedoed and sunk near Kamaishi (39°20′N 142°18′E) by USS Carp (United States Navy) with all hands.

== 14 July ==
List of shipwrecks: 14 July 1945
Ship	State	Description
Awa Maru	Japan	World War II: The cargo ship was torpedoed and sunk in Sendai Bay (40°56′N 141°52′E by United States Navy carrier-based aircraft.
CD-65	Imperial Japanese Navy	World War II: The Type C escort ship was bombed and sunk off Kamaishi (42°21′N 140°59′E) by aircraft from Task Force 38, United States Navy.
CD-74	Imperial Japanese Navy	World War II: The Type D escort ship was bombed and sunk off Kamaishi (42°21′N 140°59′E) by aircraft from Task Force 38, United States Navy.
CH-48	Imperial Japanese Navy	World War II: The CH-28-class submarine chaser was bombed and sunk off Kamaishi (39°20′N 141°58′E) by aircraft from Task Force 38, United States Navy.
No.2 Choyo Maru	Imperial Japanese Navy	World War II: The auxiliary minesweeper was sunk off Kikonai (41°38′N 140°35′E) by aircraft from Task Force 38, United States Navy.
Hakuhō Maru	Imperial Japanese Navy	World War II: The auxiliary minesweeper was bombed and sunk by United States Navy aircraft off the east coast of Hokkaido.
Hokoku Maru	Imperial Japanese Navy	World War II: The Hiyoshi Maru No. 2 Go-class auxiliary transport/tanker was sunk off Oma-saki, Tsugaru-kaikyo (41°33′N 141°08′E) by aircraft from Task Force 38, United States Navy. There were 135 dead and only 3 survivors.
3 Keijin Maru	Imperial Japanese Navy	World War II: The auxiliary minesweeper was sunk northeast of Shiriyasaki (41°30′N 141°30′E) by aircraft from Task Force 38, United States Navy.
Sonobe Maru	Imperial Japanese Navy	World War II: The auxiliary minesweeper was sunk off Hiroo, Hokkaidō (42°11′N 143°36′E) by aircraft from Task Force 38, United States Navy.
HMCS St. Francis	Royal Canadian Navy	While under tow to Boston, Massachusetts, for scrapping, the decommissioned Clemson-class destroyer collided in fog with the collier Windward Gulf (United States) and sank in 60 feet (18 m) of water on the Inner Mayo Ledge — a reef in Buzzards Bay — off Westport, Massachusetts, at 41°27′42″N 071°06′20″W. Her wreck later was demolished with explosives and flattened. Divers often incorrectly call it "HMCS St. Clair."
Tachibana	Imperial Japanese Navy	World War II: The Matsu-class destroyer was bombed and sunk in Hakodate Bay (41°48′N 141°41′E) by aircraft from Task Force 38, United States Navy. One hundred and thirty-five crew were killed.
Tamazono Maru No. 2 GO	Imperial Japanese Navy	World War II: The auxiliary minesweeper was sunk at the Kuishiro Pier, Hokkaido by aircraft from Task Force 38, United States Navy.

== 15 July ==
List of shipwrecks: 15 July 1945
Ship	State	Description
Francis Preston Blair	United States	The Liberty ship ran aground on the Saumarez Reefs, Queensland, Australia (21°49′S 153°39′E) and was wrecked.
I-351	Imperial Japanese Navy	World War II: The I-351-class submarine was torpedoed and sunk in the South China Sea (4°30′N 110°00′E) 100 nautical miles (190 km) northeast of Natuna Besar by the submarine USS Bluefish (United States Navy) with the loss of 110 lives. Bluefish rescued her three survivors.
HMS LCV(P) 1167	Royal Navy	The landing craft vehicle and personnel (8/11 t, 1943) was lost on this date.
HMS Ludlow	Royal Navy	The decommissioned Town-class destroyer was grounded in the Firth of Forth off Yellowcraigs beach, Fidra, Dirleton, East Lothian, Scotland, for use as a rocket target by Royal Air Force aircraft.
HMS Maori	Royal Navy	The wreck of Maori The refloated Tribal-class destroyer was scuttled in the Mediterranean Sea off Valletta, Malta, after she sank at her moorings in the Grand Harbour on 12 February 1942.
W-24	Imperial Japanese Navy	World War II: The No.19-class minesweeper was bombed and sunk off Kamaishi (41°38′N 141°00′E) by United States Navy aircraft.
Walter L M Russ	United Kingdom	The cargo ship (1,538 GRT, 1927) ran aground on Grassholm, Pembrokeshire. and was wrecked. She was on a voyage from Methil, Fife to Cardiff, Glamorgan. Nine crew were rescued by the Angle Lifeboat.

== 16 July ==
List of shipwrecks: 16 July 1945
Ship	State	Description
Byoritsu Maru	Imperial Japanese Navy	World War II: The auxiliary submarine chaser was sunk by a naval mine off the entrance to Chongjin Bay.
Gamble	United States	End of World War II: Damaged beyond repair, the decommissioned destroyer-minelayer, a former Wickes-class destroyer, was scuttled in the Pacific Ocean off Apra Harbor, Guam.
I-13	Imperial Japanese Navy	World War II: The Type AM submarine was depth charged and sunk in the Pacific Ocean (34°28′N 150°55′E) by USS Lawrence C. Taylor (United States Navy). Lost with all 140 crew.
Kari	Imperial Japanese Navy	World War II: The Ōtori-class torpedo boat was torpedoed and sunk in the Java Sea (05°48′S 115°53′E) 220 nautical miles (410 km) west south west of Makassar, Netherlands East Indies by USS Baya (United States Navy).
Maruko Maru	Japan	World War II: The cargo ship was sunk by a mine about four miles (6.4 km) from Woosung, China.
Nanjin Maru	Japan	World War II: The cargo ship was sunk by a mine off Wakamatsu, Japan.
Nankai	Imperial Japanese Navy	World War II: The gunboat, a former Regulus-class auxiliary minelayer, was torpedoed and sunk in the Java Sea (05°26′S 110°33′E) west of Surabaya, Netherlands East Indies, by USS Blenny (United States Navy).
Nannei Maru	Japan	World War II: The cargo ship struck a mine and sank in the South China Sea (33°56′N 130°52′E).
Nissho Maru	Japan	World War II: The cargo ship was sunk by a mine off Mutsure.
Rijo Maru	Japan	World War II: The cargo ship was sunk by a mine off Ube, Yamaguchi.
Taikosan Maru	Japan	World War II: The cargo ship was sunk by a mine off Motoyama-misaki..
Tangang 33	Greece	World War II: The tug was sunk by a mine in the Gulf of Patras off Missolonghi, Greece. Two crew were killed.

== 17 July ==
List of shipwrecks: 17 July 1945
Ship	State	Description
HMS Athlete	Royal Navy	World War II: The Favourite-class tugboat (570 GRT, 1943) struck a mine and sank off Livorno, Italy.
Hamonic	Canada	The steamer (5,265 GRT, 1909) burned at dock at Point Edward, Ontario, or Sarnia, Ontario, a total loss.
S-90	Germany	The Type 1939/40 schnellboot was beached on Bru Island.

== 18 July ==
List of shipwrecks: 18 July 1945
Ship	State	Description
CD-112	Imperial Japanese Navy	World War II: The Type D escort ship was torpedoed and sunk off Karafuto (46°04′N 142°16′E) by USS Barb (United States Navy) when she deliberately intercepted a torpedo fired at passenger ferry Soya Maru (Japan) carrying 600 passengers, mostly women and children. Soya Maru escaped unharmed. Two hundred crew, including her captain, were killed; four survivors were rescued.
CHa-211	Imperial Japanese Navy	World War II: Attack on Yokosuka: The CHa-1-class auxiliary submarine chaser was damaged at Yokosuka by American aircraft and was beached.
CHa-224	Imperial Japanese Navy	World War II: Attack on Yokosuka: The CHa-1-class auxiliary submarine chaser was sunk at Yokosuka by American aircraft.
CHa-225	Imperial Japanese Navy	World War II: Attack on Yokosuka: The CHa-1-class auxiliary submarine chaser was sunk at Yokosuka by American aircraft.
Chishima Maru	Japan	World War II: The cargo ship was bombed and sunk by Allied aircraft at 34°36′N 125°00′E.
Decommissioned Destroyer No. 18	Imperial Japanese Navy	World War II: Attack on Yokosuka: The training hulk, a former Urakaze-class destroyer, was sunk at Yokosuka by Allied aircraft.
Gyoraitei 28	Imperial Japanese Navy	World War II: Attack on Yokosuka: The torpedo boat was sunk at Yokosuka by aircraft based on USS Yorktown (United States Navy).
Harushima	Imperial Japanese Navy	World War II: Attack on Yokosuka: The cable layer, the former United States Army mine planter Col. George F. E. Harrison, was bombed and sunk at Yokosuka by aircraft based on USS Yorktown (United States Navy).
I-372	Imperial Japanese Navy	World War II: Attack on Yokosuka: The I-361-class submarine was sunk by damage from a near miss at Yokosuka by aircraft based on USS Yorktown (United States Navy).
Kasuga	Imperial Japanese Navy	World War II: Attack on Yokosuka: The training ship, a former Kasuga-class armored cruiser, was sunk at her mooring at Yokosuka by aircraft based on USS Yorktown (United States Navy).
MRS-25	Germany	World War II: The depot ship struck a mine and sank off Ballstad, Norway.
Pa-37	Imperial Japanese Navy	World War II: Attack on Yokosuka: The auxiliary patrol boat was bombed and sunk at Yokosuka by aircraft based on USS Yorktown (United States Navy).
Pa-110	Imperial Japanese Navy	World War II: Attack on Yokosuka: The auxiliary patrol boat was bombed and sunk at Yokosuka by aircraft based on USS Yorktown (United States Navy).
Pa-122	Imperial Japanese Navy	World War II: Attack on Yokosuka: The auxiliary patrol boat was bombed and sunk at Yokosuka by aircraft based on USS Yorktown (United States Navy).
Yaezakura	Imperial Japanese Navy	World War II: Attack on Yokosuka: The Matsu-class destroyer was bombed and sunk at Yokosuka by aircraft based on USS Yorktown (United States Navy). She was only 60% complete.
Yakaze	Imperial Japanese Navy	World War II: Attack on Yokosuka: The target ship/patrol boat, a former Minekaze-class destroyer, was damaged by near misses and flying debris from other ships bombed at Yokosuka by aircraft based on USS Yorktown (United States Navy). She was towed to Nagaura and placed in No. 2 drydock, eventually sinking due to lack of repairmen. Scrapped 1947.

== 19 July ==
List of shipwrecks: 19 July 1945
Ship	State	Description
Teal	United States	The 20-gross register ton, 44.8-foot (13.7 m) motor vessel sank 350 yards (320 m) below Graveyard Creek at the mouth of the Kvichak River on the Territory of Alaska's coast along Bristol Bay.

== 20 July ==
List of shipwrecks: 20 July 1945
Ship	State	Description
Kazuura Maru	Imperial Japanese Army	World War II: The Akiura Maru-class hospital ship struck a mine and was grounded on a reef off Pusan, Korea (35°05′N 129°10′E). Salvaged in 1945 and put in South Korean Navy service as a minesweeper.
Kiyokawa Maru	Imperial Japanese Navy	World War II: The Kamikawa Maru-class seaplane tender was bombed by United States Navy aircraft and was beached off Shida Beach, north of Kamioseki. She sank on 22 November. Raised in December 1948; later repaired and put in Japanese civilian passenger service.
Kyoei Maru No. 3	Japan	World War II: The tanker was torpedoed and sunk in the Gulf of Siam near Ha Tien, French Indochina (8°8′N 103°40′E) by USS Bumper (United States Navy). Forty-four crew killed.
Kyoraku Maru No. 3	Imperial Japanese Navy	World War II: The auxiliary guard boat was sunk in the Gulf of Siam by USS Bumper (United States Navy).
W-39	Imperial Japanese Navy	World War II: The W-19-class minesweeper was torpedoed and sunk in the Yellow Sea off Saishu Island (35°01′N 125°42′E) by USS Threadfin (United States Navy).

== 22 July ==
List of shipwrecks: 22 July 1945
Ship	State	Description
Choyo Maru	Japan	World War II: The cargo ship struck a mine off Rashin, Korea, and was beached.
Kiri Maru No. 2	Imperial Japanese Navy	World War II: The auxiliary guard boat was torpedoed and sunk in the Pacific Ocean east of Honshu by USS Sea Poacher (United States Navy).
Toshi Maru No. 7 GO	Imperial Japanese Navy	The auxiliary minesweeper was wrecked off Sata-Misaki, Japan (31°00′N 130°40′E).

== 23 July ==
List of shipwrecks: 23 July 1945
Ship	State	Description
CHa-117	Imperial Japanese Navy	World War II: The auxiliary submarine chaser, the former Dutch Alor-class auxiliary minesweeper Bantam, was sunk 23 nautical miles (43 km; 26 mi) south south east of Bali, Netherlands East Indies (08°10′S 115°29′E) by USS Hardhead (United States Navy).
FS-151	United States Army	The Design 330 coastal freighter ran aground on the east side of Helen Reef, six miles (9.7 km) from Helen Island (02°52′N 131°40′E). She was pulled off.
Senko Maru	Imperial Japanese Navy	World War II: The Senko Maru-class transport was bombed in Boengos Bay by British aircraft and beached. Refloated sometime in August and towed to Emma Haven, Padang, Netherlands East Indies.
Taisho Maru No. 2 GO	Imperial Japanese Navy	World War II: The auxiliary guard ship was sunk by mines off Chinhae, Korea.
Yamadori Maru	Japan	World War II: The cargo ship struck a mine outside Wakamatsu Harbor and was beached. Refloated post-War, repaired and returned to service.

== 24 July ==
List of shipwrecks: 24 July 1945
Ship	State	Description
Aoba	Imperial Japanese Navy	Aoba World War II: The stationary anti-aircraft platform, a former Aoba-class cruiser, was bombed and sunk at Kure (34°14′N 132°30′E) by American aircraft of Task Force 38. She was again bombed and further damaged on 28 July by Consolidated B-24 Liberator aircraft of the United States Seventh Air Force. Raised and scrapped November 1946.
Amagi	Imperial Japanese Navy	Amagi World War II: The Unryū-class aircraft carrier was bombed and sunk at Kure by American aircraft of Task Force 38. She was further bombed and damaged on 28 July, capsizing the next day. The wreck was refloated on 31 July 1946 and subsequently scrapped.
CHa-98	Imperial Japanese Navy	World War II: The CHa-1-class submarine chaser was sunk at Moji by American aircraft.
Gozo	United Kingdom	World War II: The 108.4-foot (33.0 m) trawler (172 GRT, 1902) was sunk by a mine 25 miles (40 km) south southwest of Old Head of Kinsale, Ireland. The crew were all saved by the trawler Phoebe (United Kingdom).
Hiap Seng Maru	Japan	World War II: During a voyage to Singapore carrying a cargo of sugar and sewing machines, the 120-gross register ton junk was sunk by gunfire in the Gulf of Siam by the submarine USS Bugara (United States Navy) after Bugara removed her crew. Bugara later released her crew.
Hyūga	Imperial Japanese Navy	Hyūga World War II: Bombing of Kure: The Ise-class battleship was bombed and heavily damaged at Kure by aircraft based on USS Bataan, USS Bennington, USS Essex, USS Hancock, USS Monterey, USS Randolph and USS Ticonderoga (all United States Navy), with 200 crew killed and 600 wounded. Her stern settled in very shallow water on 25 July (34°10′N 132°33′E), and the rest of her hull settled on the bottom on 26 July. Her remaining crew abandoned her on 1 August.
Iwate	Imperial Japanese Navy	World War II: Bombing of Kure: The training ship, a former Izumo-class cruiser, was heavily damaged by near misses when bombed at Kure by United States Navy aircraft of Task Force 38. She capsized and sank off Eta Jima (34°14′N 132°30′E) on 25 July due to damage sustained. Raised and scrapped in 1946–1947.
Kaiyō	Imperial Japanese Navy	World War II: The escort carrier struck a mine and was bombed by United States Navy aircraft in Kizuki Bay. She was towed to Beppu Bay and beached off Hinode on 25 July. Sank further on 28 July (33°20′N 131°32′E). On 9 August she was further damaged by United States Fifth Air Force North American B-25 Mitchell aircraft and partially capsized. Her crew abandoned her on 10 August. Scrapped post war.
Settsu	Imperial Japanese Navy	World War II: Bombing of Kure: The target ship, a former Kawachi-class battleship was bombed by United States Navy aircraft of Task Force 38 and beached at Etajima. Two crew were killed and two wounded. She slowly flooded, sinking on an even keel on 26 July. The wreck was abandoned on 29 July. Between June 1946 and August 1947 she was raised and towed to Harima's shipyard at Kure where the vessel was scrapped.
HMS Squirrel	Royal Navy	World War II: The Algerine-class minesweeper (940/1,225 t, 1944) struck a mine and was damaged, then caught fire. After 30 minutes the flames were beyond control and she was abandoned. Survivors were rescued by HMIS Punjab (Royal Indian Navy) in the Andaman Sea off Phuket Island, Thailand with the loss of seven crew. She was later scuttled.
USS Underhill	United States Navy	World War II: The Buckley-class destroyer escort was sunk in the Pacific Ocean (19°20′N 126°42′E) by a kaiten manned torpedo with the loss of 112 of her 234 crew.
Unidentified junk	Unknown	World War II: The junk was shelled and sunk in the Strait of Malacca (03°39′N 100°37′E) by HMS Seadog (Royal Navy).
Unidentified schooner	Unidentified	World War II: During a voyage to Singapore carrying a 10-ton cargo of airplane wheels and tires, 15 cases of airplane parts, and metal stock and sugar, the schooner was sunk by gunfire in the Gulf of Siam by the submarine USS Bugara (United States Navy) after Bugara removed her crew. Bugara later released her crew.
Unidentified whaler	Japan	World War II: The whaler was demolished by a bomb strike on the target ship Settsu (Imperial Japanese Navy) at Etajima.

== 25 July ==
List of shipwrecks: 25 July 1945
Ship	State	Description
Antofagasta	Chile	The cargo ship was driven ashore and sank at Punta Tucapel.
Arab	United States	The 8-gross register ton, 43.4-foot (13.2 m) motor towing vessel was destroyed by fire at Petersburg, Territory of Alaska.
CD-4	Imperial Japanese Navy	World War II: The Type D escort ship was bombed by United States Navy aircraft, detonating her depth charges, causing her to be run aground in Ise Bay off Toba (34°43′N 136°43′E). She was sunk on 28 July by aircraft from HMS Formidable (Royal Navy). Five crew were killed.
CHa-98	Imperial Japanese Navy	World War II: The CHa-1-class auxiliary submarine chaser was sunk at Moji by American aircraft.
Daikoku Maru No. 10 GO	Imperial Japanese Navy	The auxiliary guard ship was sunk on this date.
Eian Maru	Imperial Japanese Navy	World War II: The ship was sunk in the Pacific Ocean by American aircraft.
Esbjerg	Denmark	World War II: The passenger ship struck a mine and sank whilst on a voyage from Lübeck, Germany to Copenhagen, Denmark. All crew were rescued.
Fukuei Maru No. 10	Imperial Japanese Navy	World War II: The requisitioned Fukuei Maru No. 10-class transport was sunk in an air attack in the Bungo Strait in the Inland Sea area (33°00′N 132°10′E) by US Navy carrier aircraft.
Hitora Maru	Japan	World War II: The cargo ship was attacked by American aircraft at Innoshima and was set afire. She was beached. She was salvaged in 1950, repaired and returned to Panamanian service as Ramona.
Hoshi Maru	Japan	World War II: The government-chartered Hoshi Maru-class prisoner of war relief supply ship struck a mine and sank in Maizuru Bay (34°35′N 135°21′E).
Joo Lee Maru	Japan	World War II: After her Japanese crew abandoned her in the Gulf of Siam during a voyage from Singapore with a cargo of sugar and general stores, the 125-gross register ton schooner, flying the Rising Sun flag, was sunk by gunfire by the submarine USS Bugara (United States Navy).
Kaisoku Maru	Imperial Japanese Army	World War II: The Kaisoku Maru-class auxiliary oiler was bombed and sunk off north east Shimokamagiri Jima, near Hiro (07°07′S 115°40′E) by United States Navy aircraft.
Kian Huat	Unidentified	World War II: After her Japanese crew of four abandoned her in the Gulf of Siam during a voyage from Singapore to Champon, Thailand, with a cargo of sugar and coffee, the 50-gross register ton junk was sunk by gunfire by the submarine USS Bugara (United States Navy). The crew's fate was not recorded.
Kotobuki Maru	Imperial Japanese Navy	World War II: The troopship was bombed and beached at Maizuru. The wreck was refloated on 13 June 1949 and scrapping began.
Nichinan Maru	Imperial Japanese Army	World War II: The Standard Peacetime Type TM oiler was bombed and damaged in the Inland Sea of Japan off Iwai Shima by United States Navy aircraft and beached on Miura Beach, Iwai Shima. She was refloated, repaired and returned to service post-war.
PB-2	Imperial Japanese Navy	World War II: The patrol boat, a converted former Minekaze-class destroyer, was torpedoed and sunk in the Lombok Strait (07°07′S 115°40′E) by HMS Stubborn (Royal Navy).
HTMS Sarasin	Royal Thai Navy	World War II: The patrol boat was attacked and sunk at Phuket by British aircraft.
Unidentified cargo ship	Unidentified	World War II: After her Japanese crew abandoned the 20-gross register ton coastal cargo ship in the Gulf of Siam, a raiding party from the submarine USS Bugara (United States Navy) boarded her. After Bugara sank three other vessels, she returned to destroy the cargo ship as well.
Unidentified junk	Unidentified	World War II: During a voyage from Singapore carrying a cargo of sugar and matches, the 25-gross register ton junk was sunk by gunfire in the Gulf of Siam by the submarine USS Bugara (United States Navy) after Bugara removed her crew. Bugara later released her crew.
Unidentified schooner	Unidentified	World War II: During a voyage to Singapore carrying a cargo of 50 tons of rice, the 75-gross register ton schooner was sunk by gunfire in the Gulf of Siam by the submarine USS Bugara (United States Navy) after Bugara removed her crew.
Unidentified schooner	Unidentified	World War II: After her crew abandoned her in the Gulf of Siam during a voyage from Singapore carrying a cargo of sugar and coffee, the 51-gross register ton schooner was sunk by gunfire in the Gulf of Siam by the submarine USS Bugara (United States Navy).

== 26 July ==
List of shipwrecks: 26 July 1945
Ship	State	Description
Chit Ming Ho Maru	Unidentified	World War II: Bound for Singapore with a cargo of 75 tons of rice, the 144-gross register ton junk was sunk by gunfire in the Gulf of Siam by the submarine USS Bugara (United States Navy) after Bugara removed her crew. Bugara later released her crew.
Hinode Maru No. 18 Go	Imperial Japanese Navy	World War II: The auxiliary minesweeper was sunk off Haeju-Wan, Korea (37°58′N 126°40′E) by U.S. aircraft.
Rikuze Maru	Imperial Japanese Navy	World War II: The auxiliary minesweeper was sunk off Haeju-Wan, Korea (37°58′N 125°40′E) by US aircraft.
Unidentified cargo ship	Unidentified	World War II: Loaded with drums of aviation gasoline, the 50-gross register ton cargo ship was destroyed by fire in the Gulf of Siam after the submarine USS Bugara (United States Navy) opened gunfire on her and scored two 5-inch (130 mm) shell hits. Bugara's crew last saw the vessel′s Japanese crew jumping overboard and swimming quickly away from her.
Unidentified junk	Unknown	World War II: The junk was captured and sunk with a demolition charge in the Strait of Malacca off Cape Rachado, Malaya by HMS Seadog (Royal Navy).
Unidentified schooner	Unidentified	World War II: Bound for Singapore with a cargo of 50 tons of rice, the 75-gross register ton schooner was sunk by gunfire in the Gulf of Siam by the submarine USS Bugara (United States Navy).
Unidentified schooner	Unidentified	World War II: Bound for Singapore with a cargo of ten cases of cholera antiserum, other medical supplies, scrap iron, and rice, the 150-gross register ton schooner was sunk by gunfire in the Gulf of Siam by the submarine USS Bugara (United States Navy).
Unidentified terengganu	Japan	World War II: The 20-gross register ton terengganu (junk-rigged schooner) was sunk by gunfire in the Gulf of Siam by the submarine USS Bugara (United States Navy).
HMS Vestal	Royal Navy	World War II: The Algerine-class minesweeper (940/1,225 t, 1943) was struck by a kamikaze aircraft in the Andaman Sea off Phuket Island, Thailand with the loss of 20 crew. She was later scuttled.
Yusen Maru No. 41 GO	Imperial Japanese Navy	The auxiliary submarine chaser was sunk.

== 27 July ==
List of shipwrecks: 27 July 1945
Ship	State	Description
Chikuzen Maru	Japan	World War II: The cargo ship was torpedoed and sunk in the Yellow Sea by USS Pogy (United States Navy).
Doshi Maru	Imperial Japanese Army	World War II: The Dogo Maru-class auxiliary transport was bombed and damaged off Nishitomari, Tsushima Island by aircraft. Later sinks in shoal water. Scrapped in 1951 (unclear if repaired post war).
Giso Maru No. 40 GO	Imperial Japanese Navy	The auxiliary submarine chaser was sunk on this date.
Komahashi	Imperial Japanese Navy	World War II: The Komahashi-class submarine tender, being used as a tender for explosive motorboats, midget submarines and Kaiten manned torpedoes, was bombed by United States Navy aircraft on 25 July and grounded, bombed and sunk in shallow water at the Owase Submarine Base on 27 July. Raised and scrapped in 1949.
Kuroshio Maru No. 1	Imperial Japanese Navy	World War II: The communications ship, a converted No. 103-class landing ship, was shelled and sunk in shallow water, or beached, off Kuala Linggi, Malaya in the Strait of Malacca (02°21′N 102°01′E) by HMS Seadog and HMS Shalimar (both Royal Navy). Refloated in August and taken to Singapore.
USS LCT-1050	United States Navy	World War II: The Mk 5 landing craft tank was sunk by blast damage while tied up alongside Pratt Victory (United States) when the Victory ship was torpedoed and damaged by a Japanese aircraft at Ie-jima. She was later salvaged.
Unidentified junk	Unknown	World War II: The junk was captured and sunk with demolition charges in the Strait of Malacca by HMS Seadog (Royal Navy).
Unidentified schooner	Japan	World War II: Carrying a cargo of miscellaneous gear, the 20-gross register ton schooner was sunk by gunfire in the Gulf of Siam by the submarine USS Bugara (United States Navy) after Bugara removed her crew. Bugara later released her crew.
Unidentified schooner	Unidentified	World War II: Sailing from Singapore so overloaded with a cargo of 50 tons of sugar that her deck was almost awash, the 75-gross register ton schooner was sunk by gunfire in the Gulf of Siam by the submarine USS Bugara (United States Navy) after Bugara removed her crew. Bugara later released her crew.
Unidentified schooner	Unidentified	World War II: Bound for Singapore with a cargo of 150 tons of rice, the 200-gross register ton schooner was sunk by gunfire in the Gulf of Siam by the submarine USS Bugara (United States Navy) after Bugara removed her crew. Bugara later released her crew.

== 28 July ==
List of shipwrecks: 28 July 1945
Ship	State	Description
Banshu Maru No. 18 GO	Imperial Japanese Navy	World War II: The auxiliary minesweeper was sunk at the Kure Naval Base by aircraft from Task Force 38.
CD-30	Imperial Japanese Navy	World War II: The Type D escort ship was strafed by North American P-51 Mustang aircraft of the United States Army's 15th Fighter Group and beached in Yura Bay, then bombed and sunk at 34°20′N 135°00′E by United States Navy aircraft. Ninety-eight crew were killed, 51 were wounded.
CD-45	Imperial Japanese Navy	World War II: The Type C escort ship was rocketed and bombed by United States Navy aircraft and run aground in shallow water in Owase Bay (34°05′N 136°15′E) and abandoned by her crew. Thirty crew were killed. Her captain and 18 crewmen were wounded.
CH-14	Imperial Japanese Navy	World War II: The CH-13-class submarine chaser was damaged by United States Navy aircraft and run aground in shallow water in Owase Bay (34°05′N 136°15′E). She was still aground at the end of the war.
USS Callaghan	United States Navy	World War II: The Fletcher-class destroyer was sunk in an attack by a Japanese Yokosuka K5Y Willow kamikaze aircraft in the Pacific Ocean off Okinawa, Japan.
Hagikawa Maru	Japan	World War II: The cargo ship was torpedoed and sunk in the Inland Sea of Japan by USS Sennet (United States Navy).
Hakuei Maru	Japan	World War II: The cargo ship was torpedoed and sunk in the Inland Sea of Japan by USS Sennet (United States Navy).
Haruna	Imperial Japanese Navy	Haruna World War II: The Kongō-class battleship was bombed and sunk at Kure Naval Base by aircraft based on USS Shangri-La (United States Navy) with the loss of 65 of her 1,360 crew. The wreck was raised and scrapped in 1946.
I-404	Japan	World War II: The incomplete I-400-class submarine was bombed and sunk at Kure.
Ise	Imperial Japanese Navy	World War II: The Ise-class battleship was bombed and sunk at Ondo Seto, Hiroshima (34°15′N 132°31′E) by Vought F4U Corsair aircraft based on USS Hancock (United States Navy) and other American aircraft.
Izumo	Imperial Japanese Navy	World War II: Bombing of Kure: The training/guard ship, a former Izumo-class cruiser, was heavily damaged by near misses when bombed at Kure, Hiroshima by United States Navy aircraft of Task Force 38. She capsized and sank from damage to her seams and rivets in Koyo Bight off Eta Jima (34°14′N 132°30′E). Three crewmen were killed. The wreck was raised and scrapped in 1947.
Kiat Ann	Japan	World War II: Carrying a cargo of sugar from Singapore to Bangkok, Thailand, the 75-gross register ton schooner was sunk by gunfire in the Gulf of Siam by the submarine USS Bugara (United States Navy) after Bugara removed her crew. Bugara later released her crew.
Koryu Maru	Imperial Japanese Navy	World War II: The Koryu Maru-class auxiliary minelayer, originally built as a Type 2E standard merchant ship, was bombed and sunk at the Hitachi Zosen shipyard, Innoshima, by United States Navy aircraft.
Moose	United Kingdom	The tug collided with Kawartha Park (Canada) and sank in the River Mersey at Birkenhead, Cheshire with the loss of six of her nine crew.
Nashi	Imperial Japanese Navy	World War II: Bombing of Kure: The Matsu-class destroyer was bombed at Kure, Hiroshima (34°40′N 132°30′E) by United States Navy aircraft of Task Force 38. Seventeen crew were killed. She was raised and repaired 1954–1955. Recommissioned in the Japanese Self-Defence Forces 31 May 1956 as Wakaba (Japan Maritime Self-Defense Force), the only Imperial Japanese Navy warship to serve in Japan's new navy.
Ōyodo	Imperial Japanese Navy	Ōyodo World War II: The Ōyodo-class cruiser was bombed and damaged at Kure Naval Base by aircraft based on USS Shangri-La (United States Navy). She was towed to Etijima, Hiroshima and beached, capsizing with the loss of about 300 of her 911 crew. The wreck was raised in 1947 and scrapped in 1948.
Ramon Maru	Imperial Japanese Navy	World War II: The USSB Type 1023/Ramon Maru-class auxiliary gunboat was bombed, beached, burned out, and partially sunk at Innoshima. Salvaged post war, repaired and returned to merchant service in 1951 as Valles.
Seria Maru	Imperial Japanese Army	World War II: The Type 2TL Wartime Standard Merchant tanker was bombed by United States Navy aircraft in the Inland Sea of Japan near Aioi (34°01′N 131°25′E) and beached. Refloated, repaired and put back in service post-war.
Teiritsu Maru	Japan	World War II: The transport struck a mine in Wakasa Bay (35°32′N 135°20′E) and was beached off Maizuru. She was raised on 18 August 1948, repaired and returned to French service as Leconde de Lisle in December 1950.
Tone	Imperial Japanese Navy	World War II: Bombing of Kure: The Tone-class cruiser was bombed and damaged at Kure by United States Navy aircraft of Task Force 38. The cruiser sank the next day. Fifty-nine crew were killed and 28 were reported missing. The ship's superstructure and turrets were removed beginning on 7 April 1947. The wreck was refloated on 4 May 1948 for scrapping. Scrapping was completed on 30 September 1948.
Unidentified cargo ship	Unidentified	World War II: Bound for Singapore with a cargo of rice, the 50-gross register ton coastal cargo ship was sunk by gunfire in the Gulf of Siam by the submarine USS Bugara (United States Navy) after Bugara ordered her crew to abandon ship.
Unidentified cargo ship	Unidentified	World War II: After her crew abandoned ship, the 50-gross register ton coastal cargo ship was sunk by gunfire in the Gulf of Siam by the submarine USS Bugara (United States Navy).
Unidentified junk	Unidentified	World War II: The 25-gross register ton junk was sunk by gunfire in the Gulf of Siam by the submarine USS Bugara (United States Navy) after Bugara removed her crew. Bugara later released her crew.
Unidentified schooner	Unidentified	World War II: After her crew abandoned ship, the 300-gross register ton three-masted schooner was sunk by gunfire in the Gulf of Siam by the submarine USS Bugara (United States Navy). She came to rest on the sea bed in 24 feet (7.3 m) of water with all three of her masts protruding straight out of the water.
Unkai Maru No. 15	Japan	World War II: The cargo ship was torpedoed and sunk in the Inland Sea of Japan by USS Sennet (United States Navy).

== 29 July ==
List of shipwrecks: 29 July 1945
Ship	State	Description
Ayame	Unidentified	World War II: Bound for Singapore with a cargo of rice, the 112-gross register ton junk was sunk by gunfire in the Gulf of Siam by the submarine USS Bugara (United States Navy). Ayame came to rest in 60 feet (18 m) of water with 20 feet (6.1 m) of mast protruding above the surface.
Unidentified auxiliary ship	Imperial Japanese Navy	World War II: After her crew abandoned ship, the Imperial Japanese Navy 400-gross register ton auxiliary ship, flying the flag of the Republic of China during a voyage to Shōnan, Japan, with a cargo of cocoa beans, was sunk by gunfire in the Gulf of Siam by the submarine USS Bugara (United States Navy).
Unidentified schooner	Japan	World War II: Carrying 200 tons of sorghum molasses, the 200-gross register ton schooner was sunk by gunfire in the Gulf of Siam by the submarine USS Bugara (United States Navy) after Bugara removed her crew. Bugara later released her crew.
Unidentified schooner	Thailand	World War II: Bound for Singapore with a cargo of rice, the 50-gross register ton schooner was sunk by gunfire in the Gulf of Siam by the submarine USS Bugara (United States Navy) after Bugara removed her crew. Bugara later released her crew.

== 30 July ==
List of shipwrecks: 30 July 1945
Ship	State	Description
Banshu Maru No. 53 GO	Imperial Japanese Navy	World War II: The auxiliary submarine chaser was sunk off Obama, Japan, by carrier aircraft from Task Force 38.
CD-2	Imperial Japanese Navy	World War II: The escort ship was bombed and sunk at Kobe, Nagoya, or Maizuru, by American carrier-based aircraft.
CH-26	Imperial Japanese Navy	World War II: The CH-13-class submarine chaser was bombed and sunk in the Korea Strait off Chinkai, Korea (34°47′N 128°27′E) by United States Navy aircraft.
Hatsushimo	Imperial Japanese Navy	World War II: The Hatsuharu-class destroyer struck a mine and sank in Miyazu Bay (35°33′N 135°12′E) with the loss of seventeen of her 200 crew.
USS Indianapolis	United States Navy	World War II: The Portland-class cruiser was torpedoed and sunk in the Philippine Sea by I-58 (Imperial Japanese Navy) with the loss of 879 of her 1,196 crew. The wreck was located in August 2017.
Matsuura Maru	Japan	World War II: The cargo ship was grounded in Panova Bay. Possibly recovered by Metel (Soviet Navy) on 20 August.
Okinawa	Imperial Japanese Navy	World War II: The Ukuru-class escort ship struck a mine and sank in shallow water 6 nautical miles (11 km) north north west of Maizuru (35°30′N 135°21′E) while under attack by aircraft from USS Independence (United States Navy). One crewman was killed, two were wounded. She was scrapped in 1948.
Tatsumiya Maru	Imperial Japanese Navy	World War II: The Tatsuwa Maru-class auxiliary cargo ship crew accommodation barracks vessel was bombed and damaged in Maizuru Bay (35°33′N 135°31′E) by United States Navy carrier aircraft from Task Force 38. Sunk at some point. Raised on 19 April 1946 and repairs finished on 16 December 1947. The vessel was put in commercial service.
Taruyasu Maru	Imperial Japanese Navy	World War II: The cargo ship bombed and sunk in Maizuru Bay by United States Navy carrier aircraft from Task Force 38.
Toshima	Imperial Japanese Navy	World War II: The minelayer was bombed and sunk in Maizuru Bay by United States Navy carrier aircraft from Task Force 38.
Twako	Japan	World War II: On a voyage from Singapore with a cargo of sugar, the 29-gross register ton schooner was sunk by gunfire in the Gulf of Siam by the submarine USS Bugara (United States Navy).
Unidentified cargo ship	Unidentified	World War II: Sailing from Singapore with a cargo of rice on her maiden voyage, the 30-gross register ton coastal cargo ship was sunk by gunfire in the Gulf of Siam by the submarine USS Bugara (United States Navy) after Bugara removed her Chinese crew of eight, who cheered as Bugara sank their ship. Bugara later released them.
Unidentified cargo ship	Unidentified	World War II: Bound for Singapore with a cargo of rice, the 50-gross register ton small cargo ship, known to the Americans as a "sea truck," was sunk by gunfire in the Gulf of Siam by the submarine USS Bugara (United States Navy) after Bugara removed her crew of 10. Bugara later released them.
Yuzan Maru	Japan	World War II: The cargo ship was torpedoed and sunk in the Inland Sea of Japan by USS Sennet (United States Navy).

== 31 July ==
List of shipwrecks: 31 July 1945
Ship	State	Description
Asahi Maru	Imperial Japanese Navy	The auxiliary guard ship was sunk.
Unidentified cargo ship	Unidentified	World War II: Bound for Singapore, the 32-gross register ton cargo ship was sunk by gunfire in the Gulf of Siam by the submarine USS Bugara (United States Navy) after Bugara removed her crew. Bugara later released the crew.
Unidentified cargo ship	Imperial Japanese Navy	World War II: After her crew abandoned ship, the 37-gross register ton coastal cargo ship, on a voyage from Singapore to Champon, Thailand, with a cargo of sugar, was sunk by gunfire in the Gulf of Siam by the submarine USS Bugara (United States Navy).
Unidentified cargo ship	Imperial Japanese Navy	World War II: The 33-gross register ton coastal cargo ship was sunk by gunfire in the Gulf of Siam by the submarine USS Bugara (United States Navy).
Unidentified schooner	Imperial Japanese Navy	World War II: The 40-gross register ton schooner was sunk by gunfire in the Gulf of Siam by the submarine USS Bugara (United States Navy) after Bugara removed her crew. Bugara later released the crew.
Unidentified schooner	Unidentified	World War II: Bound for Bali with a cargo of rice and salt, the 100-gross register ton schooner was sunk by gunfire in the Gulf of Siam by the submarine USS Bugara (United States Navy) after Bugara removed her crew of 10. Bugara later released the cfrew.

== Unknown date ==
List of shipwrecks: Unknown date 1945
Ship	State	Description
HMS LCM 1185	Royal Navy	The landing craft medium was lost sometime in July.
HMS LCP(R) 965	Royal Navy	The landing craft personnel (ramped) was lost sometime in July.
HMS MTB 242	Royal Navy	The Vosper 72'-class motor torpedo boat sank while under tow off Malta.
Teiritsu Maru	Japan	World War II: The transport ship struck a naval mine and sank off the Maizuru Naval Arsenal. Refloated in August 1948, repaired and returned to her pre-war owners. Returned to service as Leconte de Lisle.
