= W150 =

W150 may refer to:

- HMS Athlete (W 150), Royal Navy tugboat
- Dodge W150, American pickup truck
- DSC-W150, model of camera manufactured by Sony
- Mercedes-Benz W150, German luxury car
- Perodua Alza (W150), Malaysian MPV
