= USS Currier =

Buckley-class destroyer escort

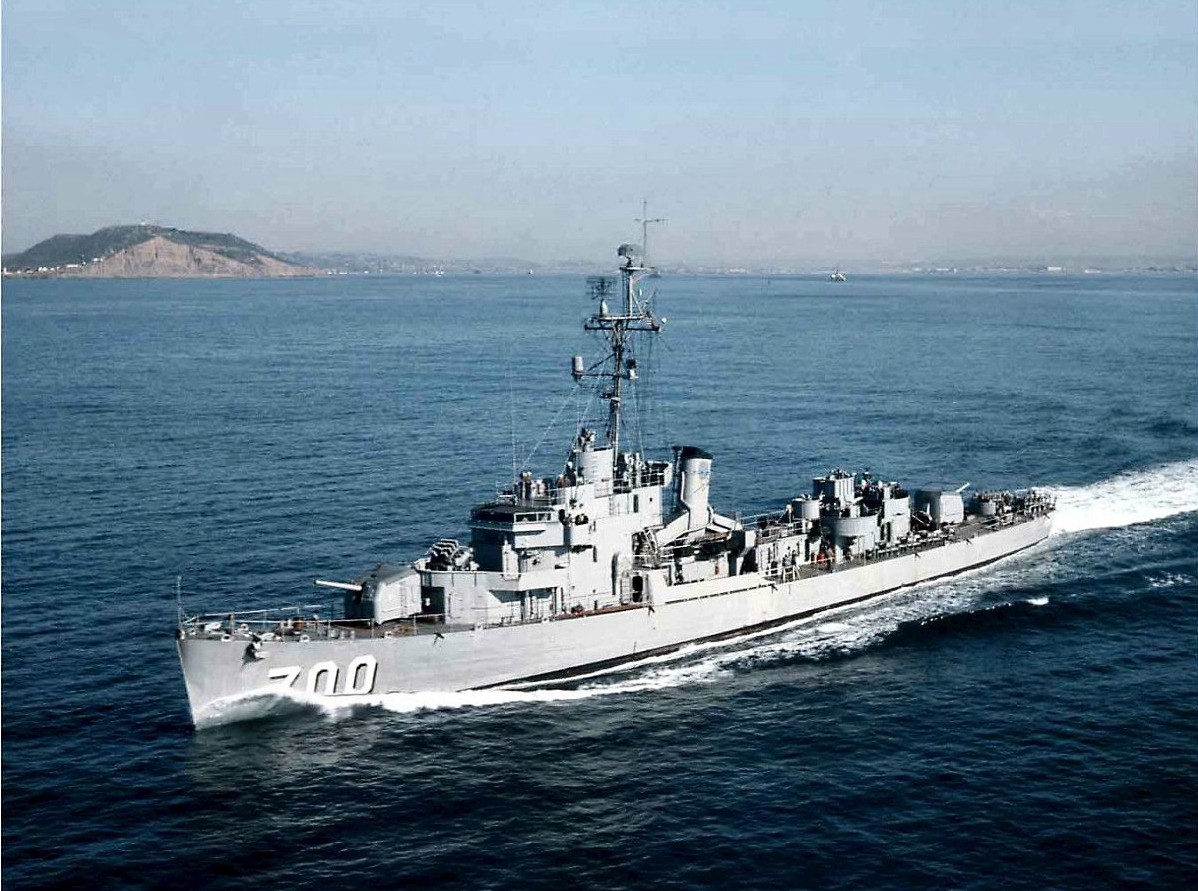
- USS Currier (DE-700) in 1959

History

United States
- Name: USS Currier
- Ordered: 1942
- Builder: Defoe Shipbuilding Co.
- Laid down: 1943
- Launched: 14 October 1943
- Commissioned: 1 February 1944
- Decommissioned: 4 April 1960
- Stricken: 1 December 1966
- Fate: Sunk as target 11 July 1967

General characteristics
- Class & type: Buckley-class destroyer escort
- Displacement: 1,400 tons standard; 1,740 tons full load
- Length: 306 ft (93 m)
- Beam: 37 ft (11 m)
- Draft: 9.5 ft (2.9 m)
- Propulsion: 2 boilers, General Electric Turbo-electric drive; 2 solid manganese-bronze 3600 lb 3-bladed propellers, 8.5 ft (2.6 m) diameter, 7 ft 7 in (2.31 m) pitch; 12,000 hp (8.9 MW); 2 rudders
- Speed: 23 knots (43 km/h)
- Range: 359 tons oil; 3,700 nautical miles (6,900 km) at 15 knots (28 km/h); 6,000 nautical miles (11,000 km) at 12 knots (22 km/h)
- Complement: 15 officers, 210 men
- Armament: 3 × 3 in (76 mm) cal. guns (76.2 mm) (3x1); 4 × 1.1"/75 caliber gun Anti-Aircraft guns (1x4); 8 × 20 mm (8x1); 3 × 21 inch (533 mm) torpedo tubes (1x3); 1 × hedgehog projector; 8 × K-gun depth charge projectors; 2 × depth charge tracks

USS Currier (DE-700) was a Buckley-class destroyer escort in service with the United States Navy from 1944 to 1960. She was sunk as a target in 1967.

== History ==
Currier was named after Lieutenant Roger Noon Currier. Currier was born in Portland, Oregon on 20 April 1913 and graduated from the United States Naval Academy on 3 June 1937. Embarked in USS Atlanta (CL-51), he was killed during the Naval Battle of Guadalcanal on the night of 13 November 1942.

=== World War II ===
Currier was launched on 14 October 1943 at the Defoe Shipbuilding Company, Bay City, Michigan. The ship was sponsored by Mrs. R. N. Currier, widow of Lieutenant Currier; and commissioned on 1 February 1944.

After a voyage on convoy escort duty to Casablanca from 28 May to 17 June 1944, Currier returned to Oran on 10 July to escort convoys passing from Oran to Naples, Bizerte, Palermo, and Gibraltar. On 12 August, she cleared Salerno with a convoy of 112 LCI(L)'s and 28 other escorts carrying troops of the 45th Infantry Regiment, for the assault landings on southern France on 14 August 1944. Currier screened the transports during the landings, then guarded convoys from Oran to the beachheads from 20 August to 4 September. Between 10 and 20 September, she was escort commander of the "Naples Shuttle", providing supplies to the invading troops. After returning to Oran, she left on 28 September for the west coast of the United States, arriving at San Diego, California on 27 October.

Currier departed San Francisco on 23 November 1944 for Saipan, arriving on 28 December for radar picket duty, patrol, and to escort convoys to Eniwetok, Ulithi, Guam, and Iwo Jima. From 29 July 1945 until the end of the war, she voyaged between Guam and Okinawa on escort duty. On 28 August she joined USS Osmus (DE-701) to accept the surrender of the Japanese garrison on Rota, then inspected the island.

=== Cold War ===
Currier departed Eniwetok on 19 September 1945 for overhaul at San Pedro. In March 1946, she was back in the Far East transporting Japanese prisoners of war from Hong Kong and Shanghai. After calling at Chinese ports, she patrolled along the Korean and northern China coast investigating small craft and taking the crew of six of these into custody for trial. She called at Manila, Philippines for a visit in February 1947, then returned to San Diego, arriving there on 2 March 1947. Between 1948 and 1952, Currier was on the west coast and in the Hawaiian Islands, concentrating on anti-submarine warfare training. On 19 April 1952, she sailed from San Diego for duty in the Western Pacific, patrolling off the east coast of Korea and in the Taiwan Straits, and participating in hunter-killer exercises in Japanese waters. Returning to San Diego on 6 September, she served as sonar school training ship until 20 May 1954 when she began her fourth Far Eastern cruise. Currier returned to San Diego on 7 September 1954 to resume local operations, primarily with the Fleet Sonar School, until being placed out of commission in reserve at San Francisco on 4 April 1960.

== Disposal ==
Currier was struck from the Naval Vessel Register on 1 December 1966. The submarine USS Bugara (SS-331) sank her as a target with a Mark 14 Mod 5 torpedo in the Pacific Ocean off California on 11 July 1967.

== Awards ==
- American Campaign Medal
- European–African–Middle Eastern Campaign Medal with one battle star for World War II service
- Asiatic-Pacific Campaign Medal with one battle star for World War II service
- World War II Victory Medal
- National Defense Service Medal
- Korean Service Medal with one service star for Korean War service
- United Nations Korea Medal (United Nations)
- Korean War Service Medal (Republic of Korea)
