= USS Bugara =

Submarine of the United States

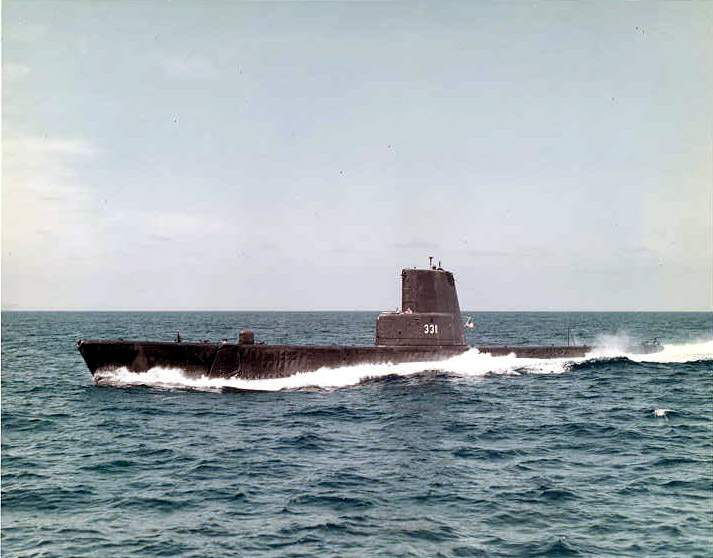
- USS Bugara (SS-331), circa 1969.

History

United States
- Name: USS Bugara (SS-331)
- Namesake: Bugara
- Builder: Electric Boat Company, Groton, Connecticut
- Laid down: 21 October 1943
- Launched: 2 July 1944
- Commissioned: 15 November 1944
- Decommissioned: 1 October 1970
- Stricken: 1 October 1970
- Fate: Foundered while under tow off Cape Flattery, Washington, 1 June 1971

General characteristics
- Class & type: Balao class diesel-electric submarine
- Displacement: 1,526 tons (1,550 t) surfaced; 2,424 tons (2,463 t) submerged
- Length: 311 ft 9 in (95.02 m)
- Beam: 27 ft 3 in (8.31 m)
- Draft: 16 ft 10 in (5.13 m) maximum
- Propulsion: 4 × General Motors Model 16-278A V16 diesel engines driving electrical generators; 2 × 126-cell Sargo batteries; 4 × high-speed General Electric electric motors with reduction gears; 2 × propellers; 5,400 shp (4.0 MW) surfaced; 2,740 shp (2.0 MW) submerged
- Speed: 20.25 knots (38 km/h) surfaced; 8.75 knots (16 km/h) submerged
- Range: 11,000 nautical miles (20,000 km) surfaced at 10 knots (19 km/h)
- Endurance: 48 hours at 2 knots (3.7 km/h) submerged; 75 days on patrol
- Test depth: 400 ft (120 m)
- Complement: 10 officers, 70–71 enlisted
- Armament: 10 × 21-inch (533 mm) torpedo tubes; 6 forward, 4 aft; 24 torpedoes; 1 × 5-inch (127 mm) / 25 caliber deck gun; Bofors 40 mm and Oerlikon 20 mm cannon

USS Bugara (SS-331), a Balao-class submarine in commission from 1944 to 1970, was a boat of the United States Navy named for the bugara, a multicolored fish found along the coast of California.

Bugara's World War II operations extended from 21 February to 17 August 1945, during which she completed three war patrols in the Flores Sea, Java Sea, South China Sea and Gulf of Siam. While the first two patrols proved uneventful, her third war patrol might be classified as one of the most colorful to be made during the war. This patrol in the Gulf of Siam was highlighted by a series of excellently conducted gun attacks which disposed of 57 small ships totaling 5,284 gross register tons. All except two of these vessels were boarded and their native crews put safely ashore with their personal belongings. One of the many interesting incidents of this patrol was an encounter with a Japanese ship manned by a Chinese crew being attacked by Malay pirates. Bugara rescued the Chinese, sank the Japanese ship, and then disposed of the pirates.

Bugara later served in the Korean War and the Vietnam War.

== Construction and commissioning ==
Bugara was laid down on 21 October 1943 by the Electric Boat Company at Groton, Connecticut. She was launched 2 July 1944, sponsored by Mrs. Anna A. Perry, wife of Captain Lyman S. Perry, and commissioned on 15 November 1944 with Commander Arnold F. Schade — a veteran of eight war patrols and recipient of the Navy Cross and the Silver Star — in command.

== Service history ==
=== World War II ===
==== November 1944–February 1945 ====
Bugara fitted out for service, conducted her shakedown, then departed on 25 December 1944 bound for the Panama Canal Zone. She conducted five days of additional training in the Panama Canal Zone, then pushed on for Pearl Harbor, Hawaii, where Schade put his crew through two more weeks of intensive training.

==== First war patrol ====
Bugara departed Pearl Harbor on 21 February 1945 to begin her first war patrol and proceeded directly to Saipan in the Mariana Islands, meeting her escort, the motor minesweeper USS YMS-151, on 5 March 1945 before reaching Saipan. On 8 March 1945, she got underway from Saipan in company with the submarines USS Spot (SS-413) and USS Sea Fox (SS-402) and an escort, the submarine chaser USS SC-775. One day out of port, on 9 March 1945, Bugara’s cook sustained a severe head laceration when the storeroom hatch fell on him, but Bugara′s pharmacist's mate was able to sew up the cut, and Bugara continued her voyage to her patrol area in the Luzon Strait. On 25 March 1945 she left the Luzon Strait and proceeded to a new patrol area in the South China Sea between Hainan Island and Formosa.

On 27 March 1945, Buugara′s lookouts spotted a ship bearing 118° north at a range of 18,000 yards (16,000 m). She closed to attack but abruptly broke it off upon identifying the markings as those of a Japanese hospital ship. On 4 April 1945, she concluded her patrol in the Hainan and Taiwan area not having encountered any other Japanese air or surface contacts and proceeded to her next patrol area in the Java Sea, north of Soemba, which she reached on 11 April 1945. At 08:15 on 18 April she exchanged recognition signals with the submarine USS Perch (SS-313) and that same day at 19:30 with the submarine USS Besugo (SS-321). On 21 April 1945 she met her escort and proceeded to Fremantle, Australia, where she ended her patrol and began a regular refit, which included the installation of a second 5-inch (127 mm)/25-caliber gun.

With Japanese shipping becoming scarce in the last months of World War II, Bugara made contact with only five ships during her entire 59-day patrol, during which she had spent 35 days in her patrol areas. Four of the vessels proved to be Japanese hospital ships, immune from attack, and the fifth an unidentified submarine Bugara first had detected by screw noises, but which turned out to be an unidentified Allied submarine.

==== Second war patrol ====
On 16 May 1945, Bugara set out on her second war patrol, bound for a patrol area in the South China Sea off the South China coast. Most of her time was spent on life guard stations looking for downed Allied airmen. She ended her patrol with her arrival on 20 June 1945 at Subic Bay on Luzon in the Philippine Islands, where she underwent a refit alongside the submarine tender USS Howard W. Gilmore (AS-16).

==== Third war patrol ====
===== Convoy action =====
Bugara stood out of Subic Bay on 16 July 1945 for her third war patrol, operating as part of a coordinated attack group under the overall command of the commanding officer of the submarine USS Brill (SS-330), Commander Harry B. Dodge. She rendezvoused with Brill on 19 July 1945, and Dodge ordered her to conduct a retiring search to her northward position in the attack group.

At 15:40 on 19 July 1945, Bugara′s lookouts sighted a mast on the horizon and closed with it at full speed but lost the contact. However, 20 minutes later, her lookouts again sighted masts, this time of ships making up a convoy, as well as what Bugara identified as a Japanese periscope at a range of 800 yards (730 m). Schade ordered Bugara to dive in order to reverse course and then surface at flank speed. The supposed Japanese periscope turned out to be that of Brill, also chasing the convoy. Schade tried to ascertain Brill′s attack position so that the two submarines could coordinate their attack, but could not get Brill to answer Bugara′s challenge, so the submarines began separate approaches to the convoy without a set plan of attack. At 22:05, Bugara picked up several contacts on radar at a range of 18,000 yards (16,500 m) and went ahead at full speed at 17 knots (31 km/h; 20 mph). At nearly the same time, Bugara received information from Dodge that the submarines USS Cod (SS-224) and USS Bumper (SS-333) were on her port flank, with Brill and Bugara on the starboard. Dodge announced that Brill was going in to attack, and Schade radioed back that Bugara would follow Brill in.

Bugara fired nine torpedoes into the Japanese convoy, including two at a small engines-aft tanker at a range of 850 yards (780 m), two at a second small engines-aft tanker at a range of 950 yards (870 m), two at a small cargo ship (known to the Americans as a "sea truck") at a range of 1,500 yards (1,400 m), one at an escorting patrol craft at a range of 900 yards (820 m), and two at a large trawler (which Bugara assumed was an escort), at a range of 700 yards (640 m). Brill also attacked the convoy, but none of Bugara′s or Brill′s torpedoes hit. Both Schade and Dodge concluded that their torpedoes ran normally but had passed underneath their targets. The Japanese did not counterattack the submarines.

===== 20 July =====
At 14:45 on 20 July 1945, Bugara′s lookouts sighted a junk and closed to get alongside. After taking off the junk's crew of six natives, Bugara sent a boarding party aboard the junk for inspection. The boarding party found that the junk was carrying bags of sugar from Singapore to Bangkok, Thailand, both Japanese-controlled ports. The junk′s crew claimed that the junk's cargo was destined for China, not the Japanese. Although unconvinced, Bugara′s crew kept all of the junk crew's papers for later analysis by intelligence personnel and let them go after 90 minutes alongside the junk.

At 16:30 on 20 July 1945, Bugara boarded another large junk which had departed Bangkok with a cargo hold full of bagged rice. The junk's crew claimed the cargo was destined for China, not the Japanese, and Bugara confiscated the junk's logbook and released the crew. At 20:30, Bugara inspected a third junk, whose crew told a similar story of transporting the vessel's cargo of rice to China and not to Japanese troops. Schade subsequently sent a message to Commander, Task Force 71, requesting approval his of actions of letting supplies go through.

===== 23–24 July =====
On 23 July 1945, after diving to avoid an Imperial Japanese Navy Kawanishi H8K Type 2 (Allied reporting name "Emily") flying boat headed out from the beach off the coast of Lem Chong Pra, Schade ordered a commando party ashore heavily armed with demolition equipment. After six hours, Bugara picked up the commandos at 04:00 on 24 July 1945. Highly embarrassed, they reported that the jungle was so thick they had not been able get off the beach.

At 13:35 on 24 July 1945, Bugara examined a Singapore-bound schooner carrying a 10-ton military cargo of airplane wheels and tires, 15 cases of airplane parts, and metal stock and sugar. She removed the schooner's crew and sank the vessel with gunfire. At 14:25, she stopped the 120-gross register ton Japanese junk Hiap Seng Maru, which was carrying a cargo of sugar and sewing machines to Singapore. After boarding and examining Hiap Seng Maru, Bugara sank her with gunfire. With the schooner's and Hiap Seng Maru′s crews and their boats on her deck, Bugara moved to a point 5 nautical miles (9.3 km; 5.8 mi) off shore, gave the crew members bread, and released them.

===== 25 July =====
On 25 July at 14:05, Bugara′s crew boarded a 75-gross register ton schooner bound for Singapore with a cargo of 50 tons of rice and sank her with gunfire after taking off her crew. At 15:35, Bugara halted a 25-gross register ton junk sailing from Singapore carrying a Japanese cargo of sugar and matches . Although most of Bugara′s crew thought the junk's crew were Japanese, their nationality could not be proven, so Bugara released them and sank their ship with gunfire. At 16:24, Bugara′s raiding party boarded an empty 20-gross register ton coastal cargo ship left abandoned by her Japanese crew, and Bugara left it, planning to return and sink it later.

At 16:50, Bugara halted and boarded her ninth contact in just a day, a brand-new 51-gross register ton schooner sailing from Singapore with a cargo of sugar and coffee. The schooner's crew abandoned ship and Bugara sank her with gunfire, not bothering to capture her crew. Bugara made her next contact at 17:30 when her raiding party boarded the 50-gross register ton junk Kian Huat, which was carrying sugar and coffee from Singapore to Champon, Thailand. Kian Huat′s Japanese crew of four abandoned ship, their later fate unknown, and Bugara sank her with gunfire. One hour later, the Japanese crew of the 125-gross register ton schooner Joo Lee Maru, flying the Japanese Rising Sun flag and loaded with a cargo of sugar and miscellaneous stores from Singapore, abandoned ship when Bugara stopped them, and Bugara sank the schooner with gunfire. Bugara then returned to the abandoned coastal cargo ship she had boarded earlier and destroyed it with gunfire.

===== 26 July =====
On 26 July 1945, lookouts on board Bugara sighted three terengganus (junk-rigged schooners) at 03:00, and boarded them all. Two were native vessels from Japanese-occupied British Malaya and carrying cargo of no military value, so Bugara let them go. The other was a 20-gross register ton vessel under Japanese registry, and Bugara sank her, Bugara′s crew noting that the Malayan native crews of the other two terengganus "seemed almost happy to get rid of this one.” At 08:45 that morning, Bugara searched the 144-gross register ton junk Chit Ming Ho Maru, which was bound for Singapore with a cargo of 75 tons of rice, and sank her with gunfire, letting her crew go. At 15:50, Bugara boarded a brand-new 50-gross register ton "sea truck" loaded with drums of aviation gasoline, then set her ablaze with two 5-inch (127 mm) shell hits, destroying her; Bugara′s crew last saw the "sea truck′s" Japanese crew jumping overboard and swimming quickly away from her.

Bugara next sank a 75-gross register ton schooner loaded with 50 tons of rice and headed for Singapore. At 17:40, she moved into waters as shallow as 7 fathoms (42 ft; 13 m) to stop and sink a 150-gross register ton schooner loaded with 10 cases of cholera antiserum), other medical supplies, scrap iron, and rice. The next small craft Bugara′s crew boarded was an empty 50-gross register ton schooner and, unable to determine her destination, Schade let her pass. At 20:30, Bugara went alongside the two Malayan native terengganus she had passed earlier in the day and, according to Schade, “got a big cheer.”

===== 27 July =====
On 27 July 1945 at 08:10, Bugara came alongside a native Thai lugger whose “very friendly" crew tried to give Bugara their cargo of live chickens" and urged Bugara to "go get some Nippon." At 09:50, Bugara boarded an empty 300-gross register ton schooner manned by a native crew that denied any Japanese connections. Although Bugara′s crew doubted the Japanese would not be using such a large vessel, they let the schooner go. One hour later, Bugara′s raiding party boarded a 20-ton schooner flying the Japanese flag and carrying a load of miscellaneous gear, removed her crew, and sank her with gunfire. The crew was friendly, expressed a desire to remain with Bugara and repeatedly said that the Japanese had lost the war and they were glad they would no longer have to work for the Japanese. Bugara′s galley fed them, and one received medical treatment for an unlisted ailment.

At 13:40, Bugara′s lookouts spotted a Japanese Kawanishi H8K (Allied reporting name "Emily") flying boat, so Bugara quickly backed full, put the natives over the side in their lifeboat, then went ahead full and dived to 10 fathoms (60 ft; 18 m). Schade reported that he last saw the natives headed for shore in their boat, apparently safe. The Japanese flying boat gave no indication that it had spotted either Bugara or the natives headed to shore and departed the area. Only 15 minutes later, Bugara surfaced to chase a loaded 75-gross register ton schooner, and nearly an hour later, at 14:45, she was only 3,000 yards (2,700 m) from the schooner at gun action stations when the flying boat reappeared, so Bugara dived once more to 10 fathoms (60 ft; 18 m). At 15:05, after the flying boat departed, Bugara surfaced alongside the schooner, which was sailing from Singapore loaded with 50 tons of sugar and so full that her decks were almost awash. After removing the crew, Bugara sank the schooner by gunfire.

At 20:50, Bugara spotted a mast at a range of about 24,000 yards (21,900 m) with darkness falling quickly on a moonless night. Bugara closed at full speed and at a range of 8,000 yards (7,300 m) identified her quarry as a probable schooner. Bugara′s crew went to gun action stations. Coming alongside, Bugara found the vessel to be a 200-gross register ton schooner loaded with at least 150 tons of rice bound for Singapore. Bugara removed the schooner′s crew before sinking her with gunfire.

===== 28 July =====
On 28 July 1945, Bugara began the day at 09:45 boarding a 50-gross register ton coastal cargo ship loaded with rice and bound for Singapore. The crew was ordered off before Bugara′s gunners made short work of the ship and sank her. At 10:44, Bugara made her 25th contact of her war patrol, when a second 50-ton coastal cargo ship made for the edge of a minefield with Bugara in pursuit. While Bugara was alongside the vessel, an Imperial Japanese Navy Mitsubishi F1M Type 0 (Allied reporting name "Pete") observation floatplane approached from shore. With the crew of the cargo ship having abandoned ship and clear of their vessel, Bugara′s gunners opened fire and sank the small vessel just as the floatplane turned around and headed back toward shore. Three hours later, Bugara′s lookouts spotted a 300-gross register ton three-masted schooner close to shore. Schade decided sinking the large schooner was worth the risk of entering shallow water near shore, and ordered Bugara in at flank speed. The schooner′s Japanese crew apparently had abandoned ship early, so Schade ordered Bugara to open gunfire on the schooner without bothering to first board her and ascertain her cargo. The schooner sank in 24 feet (7.3 m) of water with all three of her masts sticking straight out of the water. Bugara then retired to deeper water at high speed.

At 16:35, a boarding party from Bugara descended upon the 75-gross register ton schooner Kiat Ann. Papers found on board listed a cargo of sugar from Singapore to Bangkok, but an adamant crew claimed the cargo was rice, bound for Singapore. Although Kiat Ann was registered to the Japanese and Bugara′s crew was almost certain that four members of her crew were Japanese, Bugara removed and released the entire crew, then sank Kiat Ann with gunfire.

At 21:25, Bugara went alongside a Chusan-type junk of 25 gross register tons. The seven-man crew, all Canton Chinese, seemed friendly, but freely admitted they had just returned from carrying a load of rice to Singapore, and had returned for a second load. The crew of the junk was brought on board Bugara before their craft was destroyed by gunfire. Schade agreed to keep what he described as “one intelligent volunteer as interpreter.” The man was cleaned up, given a physical examination, and dressed up in dungarees. The rest of the junk crew complained that their lifeboat no longer was seaworthy, so Schade ordered Bugara to make a long haul around the minefield, approach the 4-fathom (24 ft; 7.3 m) curve, and put the junk crew over the side in their lifeboat. He then decided, since it was now late, to instead allow the junk crew spend the night aboard Bugara, sleeping on empty torpedo skids, and put them aboard the first sailboat Bugara found as she continued her patrol.

===== 29 July =====
On 29 July 1945, Schade noted the toll that the continuous operations had taken on his men and submarine, observing that crew members were tired, the guns needed cleaning, and the diesel engines needed routine maintenance after operating a full speed so much of the time while Bugara pursued targets. He decided to withdraw from shore, give the crew a rest day, and allow the crew to watch a movie for the first time during the war patrol. Shipping activity soon interfered with his plans. At 09:05, Bugara sank a large 200-gross register ton schooner carrying 200 barrels of sorghum molasses and flying the Japanese flag. At 13:25, Bugara boarded a 400-gross register ton Imperial Japanese Navy auxiliary flying the flag of the Republic of China. The vessel had a certificate stating that her cargo of cocoa beans was for the Imperial Japanese Navy and that she was bound for Shōnan, Japan. After the vessel's crew abandoned ship, Bugara′s gunners sank her.

At 14:10, Bugara intercepted the 112-gross register ton junk Ayame, loaded with rice and headed toward Singapore. Bugara′s boarding party found that Ayame′s cargo did not agree with her Japanese manifest, which listed "machinery" as the cargo. After Bugara sank her with gunfire, Ayame came to rest on the bottom in 60 feet (18 m) of water with 20 feet (6 m) of mast showing above the surface. At 14:42, Bugara halted and searched a 50-gross register ton schooner flying the Thai flag and loaded with rice bound for Singapore, then sank her by gunfire. At 16:00, Bugara′s lookouts sighted a Kawanishi H8K (Allied reporting name "Emily") flying boat flying over the water at a very low altitude, but the big flying boat′s crew did not seem to spot Bugara.

Schade decided to put the native crew of the schooner ashore at dark, and looked over the coast of Koh Tan in order to find a safe-looking place to do so. Upon spotting what Schade described as a "smart-looking village which we thought looked like Jap[anese] barracks,” Schade consulted with the interpreter and approved the site. Bugara put a four-man-sized rubber boat into the sea with one of Bugara′s officers and all seven natives aboard along with some food and clothing for the natives. At 22:20, the native crewmen expressed great sorrow at leaving Bugara and shook hands with "almost everyone." Closing within 400 yards (370 m) of the beach and in only 5 fathoms (30 ft; 9 m) of water, Bugara dropped off the Thai sailors at the agreed-upon site, and by 23:40, the officer and the rubber boat were back on board Bugara.

===== 30 July =====
At 09:40 on 30 July 1945, Bugara examined a 30-gross register ton coastal cargo ship on her maiden voyage, manned by a Chinese crew of eight and proceeding from Singapore carrying sugar. The ship's crew was delighted when Bugara′s boarding party came aboard, explained they had hoped a U.S. ship would find them, and then begged to stay aboard Bugara, one of them even making a special trip back aboard their ship to get a Japanese flag for Bugara′s crew. Schade made one of the Chinese, who had graduated from a university in England, his interpreter, and Bugara′s crew dubbed him "Charlie Wong." All of the Chinese sailors cheered when Bugara′s gunners sank their ship by gunfire. At 10:40, Bugara sighted a plane flying toward her, and Schade quickly sent the Chinese crew below and dived. At 11:05, Bugara surfaced, and her crew recovered the Chinese sailors’ lifeboat and lashed it to the deck.

Nearly two hours later, at 13:00, Bugara′s boarding party raided the 29-gross register ton schooner Twako, flying the Rising Sun flag and carrying sugar from Singapore. Bugara′s gun crews sank Twako. By now, Bugara needed to conserve ammunition, and her 5-inch (127 mm) guns were allowed to fire only two rounds to sink each target.

Several hours later, at 18:40, Bugara went alongside a seaworthy fishing boat and transferred her passengers with all of their gear to the smaller craft. Schade noted that the fishermen “were completely bewildered, but all seemed happy.” “Charlie Wong” performed introductions between the foreign crews and the American submariners.

Bugara next chased a 50-gross register ton "sea truck" which almost made it to the protective cover of the minefield before Bugara overtook and came alongside her. The vessel was loaded with rice and bound for Singapore. The 10 men aboard the vessel told "Charlie Wong" that pirates had taken their clothes, papers and lifeboat. Distrusting them, Bugara′s crew rigged a canvas from the aft 5-inch (127 mm) gun so that they could shelter on Bugara′s deck for the night under guard by a Bugara sailor. Bugara then sank the "sea truck" with gunfire.

===== 31 July =====
In the predawn darkness of 31 July 1945, Bugara sighted and made radar contact on an unidentified ship. She tailed the vessel until dawn and then closed in for the kill. The ship she stalked turned out to be a 32-gross register ton coastal cargo ship bound for Singapore. At 08:11, after taking the crew and their lifeboat on deck, Bugara sank her with gunfire. At 09:05, five Japanese fighter planes, identified as Imperial Japanese Navy Mitsubishi J2M Raiden ("Thunderbolt") interceptor fighters (Allied reporting name "Jack") flew in low at Bugara. Despite having her own crew at gun action stations and 17 natives, whatever they had brought with them from their sunken ships, and one of their lifeboats on deck, Bugara succeeded in getting everyone below and diving, although she lost the lifeboat in the process. Twenty minutes later, she surfaced, and her crew returned to gun stations. Bugara sighted three Japanese twin-engine aircraft but did not dive, and the Japanese planes drew away.

At 09:46, Bugara′s raiding party overtook a 40-gross register ton schooner flying the Imperial Japanese Navy flag. Her crew was brought on board Bugara, which sank her with the allotted two rounds of 5-inch (127 mm) gunfire. Another contact popped up on radar, and Bugara gave chase. At 10:20, Bugara sighted a single-engine fighter at a range of 12 nautical miles (22 km; 14 mi) but did not submerge. The fighter flew down Bugara′s starboard side but did not engage her. Fifteen minutes later a twin-engined floatplane also flew past on Bugara′ starboard side. Schade ordered Bugara to resume her pursuit of the vessel, and the raiding party boarded what turned out to be a 100-gross register ton schooner bound for Bali in the Japanese-occupied Netherlands East Indies carrying a cargo of rice and salt. All of the schooner's papers had been lost, but the captured crew admitted the cargo was intended for Japanese use. Two 5-inch (127 mm) rounds quickly sank the schooner.

At 11:10, Bugara′s lookouts spotted two Aichi E13A Type 0 reconnaissance seaplanes (Allied reporting name "Jake") that closed on her fast just as she dived. The presence of Japanese aircraft in her operating area led Schade to worry that it might be difficult to release safely the 25 captured crewmen she now had aboard.

At 14:10, Bugara sank a brand-new 37-gross register ton coastal cargo ship flying the Rising Sun flag after its crew abandoned ship. It had been carrying sugar from Singapore to Champon, Thailand. The boarding party then moved on to contact number 40 of Bugara′s war patrol, a 33-ton coastal cargo ship also flying the Imperial Japanese Navy ensign, and Bugara′s gunners sank her. At 14:32, Bugara closed the coast, where her lookouts spotted a number of fishing boats. Stopping alongside one of the larger ones, Bugara transferred the 25 captured crewmen she had aboard to it.

Moving on at 15:00, Bugara received word of a downed United States Army Air Forces B-24 Liberator bomber 125 nautical miles (232 km; 144 mi) to the north, and set off at full speed to search for its crew, Schade hoping that other submarines could join Bugara so that they could mount a coordinated search. The submarine USS Lamprey (SS-372) joined Bugara at 22:00, but the submarines were forced to wait until dawn to begin their search, as it was too dangerous to conduct a rescue in hostile waters at night.

===== 1–4 August =====
At 03:15 on 1 August 1945, the submarine USS Cobia (SS-245) joined Bugara and Lamprey, and at dawn the three submarines formed a scouting line and began a coordinated search for the missing B-24′s crew. At 15:30, Bugara received orders to halt the search. She passed these orders to the commanding officers of Cobia and Lamprey and parted company with the other two submarines. At 16:00, Bugara returned to her patrol station.

On 2 August 1945, after sighting a large schooner, Bugara closed with and boarded her. The 211-gross register ton schooner carried a cargo from Singapore of what her manifest called "miscellaneous gear," but Bugara′s boarding party was unable to make a good search in the dark, so Bugara took off the schooner′s crew and two lifeboats and sank her with gunfire. Soon after, one of the lifeboats sank. The other was too heavy to haul on deck, so Bugara towed it behind her. At 04:00, that lifeboat also sank after it became caught in the port screw, damaging it.

At 08:09 on 2 August 1945, Bugara boarded a 20-gross register ton Malaccan coastal cargo ship carrying coffee. Because she was flying the Japanese flag, Bugara removed her crew and sank her with gunfire. Bugara next made the 43rd contact of her war patrol, which proved to be a new 180-gross register ton schooner on a voyage from Singapore flying the Rising Sun flag. Bugara searched and sank her as well. Bugara subsequently boarded, examined, and sank an 18-gross register ton coastal cargo ship, a 117-gross register ton schooner, and a new Japanese 150-gross register ton schooner. While Bugara′s gunners sank the latter schooner, six large Malayan canoes manned by with a Chinese crew carrying rice arrived on the scene. Pirates, who already had killed two members of the Chinese crew, were pursuing the canoes, which Bugara brought on board. The pirates tried to flee, but Bugara opened gunfire on them and destroyed their boats, much to the pleasure of the Chinese crew. Bugara then put the Chinese ashore.

Bugara sank two more vessels on 3 August 1945, a 56-gross register ton "sea truck" loaded with rice and the 100-gross register ton Imperial Japanese Navy Junk No. 2218. A Bugara boarding party removed the crews from both craft before Bugara′s gunners sank them with the standard allotment of two 5-inch (127 mm) rounds each. On 4 August 1945, Bugara sank three more vessels: a 50-gross register ton coastal cargo ship, a 300-gross register ton junk, and a 450-gross register ton schooner carrying copra and coconut oil. Later that day, Bugara′s lookouts noted two Imperial Japanese Navy Kawanishi H8K (Allied reporting name "Emily") flying boats, the first at a range of 8 nautical miles (15 km; 9.2 mi) and the second searching in the area where she sank all three vessels. This second Japanese plane flew so close to Bugara that her crew could see its markings clearly.

===== 5–12 August =====
At 07:40 on 5 August 1945, Bugara boarded, searched, and sank a 200-gross register ton schooner heavily loaded with coffee, sugar, sewing machines, and other gear. Bugara next sank a 75-gross register ton junk. Bugara then chased a small 20-gross register ton junk which beached herself at Lem Chong Pra. The crew fled before Bugara could capture them, so Bugara′s gun crews hit the junk amidships with one 5-inch (127 mm) shell and Bugara left her to sink. At 17:10 the submarine USS Ray (SS-271) surfaced nearby, and Bugara went alongside Ray to exchange information. Later that evening, at 19:30, Bugara spotted two vessels behind the island of Koh Khai. Bugara allowed herself to be seen patrolling the seaward side of the island as both vessels hid behind it. At sunset, Bugara closed with them. The crew of the first vessel, a 64-gross register ton schooner at anchor, quickly abandoned ship as Bugara closed in, and Bugara′s gunners sank her. It had become too dark for Bugara to find the second vessel, so she cleared the area.

On 6 August 1945, Bugara took station in the narrows of Samui Strait in the hope of finding more targets. Having misjudged the fathom curve by a few nautical miles and finding herself in shallow water, she headed back to safe water and soon found her first target of the day, a 125-gross register ton junk bound from Singapore for Bangkok with a cargo of rice. The captain of the junk proved reluctant to part with his Japanese flag, but was eventually persuaded to relinquish it. Bugara took off the junk's crew and sank her with gunfire. After also sinking a brand new coastal cargo ship with a gross register tonnage Bugara estimated at 30 — although the ship's papers gave it as 16.6 — and four more junks, Bugara sighted a submarine at 20:03 which turned out to be the British HMS Sleuth, a Royal Navy submarine also operating in the Gulf of Siam and investigating the four junks. Bugara decided to assist Sleuth in her search-and-destroy efforts and boarded and sank with gunfire two more vessels, a 26-gross register ton junk flying the Japanese flag and a 75-gross register ton schooner loaded with aviation gasoline which Bugara′s gunners set ablaze.

After exchanging information with Sleuth′s crew, Bugara made a radar contact at 22:46 which came into sight. Bugara closed in on the vessel, a 60-gross register ton junk, firing a burst of 20-millimeter fire to grab her attention. The junk′s crew abandoned ship, leaving her with her sails up with a stiff wind blowing and making it difficult for Bugara to go alongside her. Despite this, Bugara brought her crew aboard, sent the junk to the bottom with the usual two 5-inch (127 mm) shots, and then released the junk's crew near shore.

===== 7–15 August 1945 =====
Bugara sank two more coastal cargo ships on 7 August 1945. She sank the first, a new 26.5-gross register ton vessel flying the Imperial Japanese Navy ensign, at 07:50. The second, a slightly larger 28-gross register ton vessel loaded with rice bound for Singapore, became Bugara′s last victim of World War II. At 15:50, Bugara passed through floating wreckage, finding many large cases and gasoline drums. She salvaged a case and found it full of Imperial Japanese Army mess kits. Bugara′s gunners opened fire on the drums and cases with .50 and .30-caliber machine guns, and in a matter of minutes many gasoline fires had started all around Bugara.

After sighting two Japanese aircraft, Bugara dived. After she surfaced, she sighted four possible medium junks and two sailing vessels close to shore between Hilly Cape and Patani Roads at 19:40. Suddenly, she sighted a periscope at a distance of only 4,000 yards (3,700 m). Schade reported that "It was so large and steady we did not believe it was a scope and passed it close aboard." He decided to ignore the periscope and close with the other vessels. The sailboats were native-owned and carrying tapioca, so Bugara let them go on their way. The remaining vessels were beached, and Schade decided not to close any further as darkness prevented him from determining what was in the vicinity close to shore. HMS Sleuth suddenly surfaced 4 nautical miles (7.4 km; 4.6 mi) astern of Bugara, and Schade noted it had been Sleuth′s periscope that Bugara sighted earlier. At 24:00, Bugara departed the area in accordance with her operation order to conclude her patrol.

Bugara started a southbound transit of Lombok Strait at 19:00 on 12 August 1945, clearing the passage three hours later. She then set course for Fremantle, Australia. During her passage through the Indian Ocean from Lombok Strait to Fremantle, hostilities with Japan ended on 15 August 1945.

Schade received a Bronze Star Medal for his command of Bugara during her highly successful third patrol, one he remembered as "one of the most colorful to be made during the war." During the patrol, Bugara sank 57 small ships with an aggregate gross register tonnage of 5,284. Her victims included 12 junks totaling 1,162 gross register tons, 24 schooners totaling 3,057 gross register tons, 16 coastal cargo ships totaling 489 gross register tons, three "sea trucks" totaling 156 gross register tons, a 400-gross register ton naval auxiliary, and a 20-gross register ton terengganu. Bugara and her crew received the Submarine Combat Patrol insignia for the patrol.

=== 1945–1950 ===
On 17 August 1945 Bugara arrived at Fremantle, Australia, concluding her final war patrol. After a few days, she proceeded to Subic Bay on Luzon in the Philippine Islands, joining the other submarines of her squadron there. She operated from Subic Bay until January 1946, when she received orders to proceed to Pearl Harbor and then continue on to San Diego, California. She reached San Diego in February 1946, and her crew took leave in groups until mid-March 1946. After intensive daily training underway, Bugara proceeded to Pearl Harbor, her new home port, in May 1946 and reported for duty with Submarine Squadron 5.

On 28 May 1946, Bugara took part in training off Oahu during which she sank the captured Japanese submarine I-14 as a torpedo target to keep I-14′s technology out of Soviet hands as relations with the Soviet Union deteriorated prior to the onset of the Cold War. On 21 June 1946, Bugara began an overhaul at Pearl Harbor Naval Shipyard. After completion of the overhaul, she made a training cruise into the Bering Sea and port visits to Seattle, Washington, and Portland, Oregon, before returning to Pearl Harbor.

Through all of 1947, Bugara pursued an intensive training and operations schedule. During the summer of 1947, she put to sea in company with the submarines USS Bergall (SS-320) and USS Brill (SS-330) for a coordinated attack exercise against the battleship USS Iowa (BB-61) in the Hawaiian Islands. Taking up a position in the Alenuihaha Channel, the submarines attempted to intercept the battleship as she made a high-speed run between Maui and the island of Hawaii. Although Iowa enjoyed land-based air cover and tried to throw off her pursuers by several radical course changes, the submarines still achieved four "successful" mock attacks against the battleship. Bugara participated in Navy Day exercises at Stockton, California, in October 1947. In November 1947, she took part in fleet exercises off Southern California under Commander, First Task Fleet. On 14 November 1947, during a submerged practice attack against the destroyer USS Orleck (DD-886), Bugara collided with Orleck, suffering a jammed periscope and radar but able to proceed without assistance. Investigation of the damage soon thereafter revealed the periscope shears bent 10 degrees, with the lower periscope jammed in the lower position. Bugara underwent repairs and an overhaul at Hunters Point Naval Shipyard in San Francisco, California, between 20 November 1947 and 19 March 1948.

Bugara departed San Francisco on 27 March 1948 and made for Pearl Harbor, where she reported for duty with Submarine Squadron 5 on 7 April 1948. She spent the next six weeks in training, often rendering services to other U.S. Navy units, as well as conducting a short United States Naval Reserve training cruise in the Hawaiian Islands from Pearl Harbor to Kauai from 30 April to 2 May 1948.

On 21 May 1948, Bugara departed Pearl Harbor for Melbourne, Australia. During her voyage, one of her crewmen fell ill, and she diverted on 29 May 1948 to make an unscheduled stop at Pago Pago on Tutuila in American Samoa, where she transferred the sailor ashore on 30 May 1948 for treatment at the U.S. Naval Dispensary at Pago Pago. On 31 May 1948, Bugara departed Pago Pago and resumed her voyage to Melbourne, where she arrived on 9 June 1948. She departed for Perth in Western Australia on 11 June, arriving there on 18 June 1948. After a four-day stay, she put to sea once again on 22 June 1948 bound for Guam in the Mariana Islands. She arrived at Guam on 4 July 1948, where she underwent repairs. After their completion, she rendered services to surface ships and aircraft in the Guam area from 16 to 22 July 1948, then departed for Pagan in the Mariana Islands, where she conducted shore bombardment exercises and landed stores and passengers for United States Marine Corps forces stationed there. Her next port of call was Yokosuka, Japan, where she arrived on 27 July 1948. she also made stops at Tsingtao, China, and Buckner Bay on Okinawa in the Ryukyu Islands.

Bugara was conducting antisubmarine warfare exercises off Okinawa on 9 August 1948 when Tropical Storm Chris struck with winds as high as 95 kilometers per hour (59 miles per hour; 51 knots). In company with ships of Destroyer Squadron 1, which formed an evasion group, Bugara proceeded south to avoid the tropical storm. On 10 August 1948, having gotten off the track of the storm, Bugara set course for Midway Atoll in the Northwestern Hawaiian Islands, arriving there on 19 August 1948. After a brief stay, she set course for Pearl Harbor, which she reached on 24 August 1948. Throughout the remainder of 1948 and until August 1949, Bugara engaged in local operations in Hawaiian waters from Pearl Harbor, providing services to many ships and aircraft in the area and engaging in training of her own crew.

On 13 August 1949 Bugara departed Pearl Harbor for overhaul at Mare Island Naval Shipyard in Vallejo, California. She returned to Pearl Harbor on 3 January 1950 and subsequently engaged in local operations in Hawaiian waters.

=== Korean War ===
While Bugara was in Hawaii, the Korean War broke out on 25 June 1950 when North Korean forces invaded South Korea. In September 1950, she departed Pearl Harbor for the Far East, where she supported United Nations forces fighting on the Korean Peninsula. She suffered damage while in Japan, and had to cut her tour short to return to Pearl Harbor for repairs. After completion of her repairs and the end of the Christmas holiday season in late December 1950, Bugara once more departed for the Far East, where she again supported United Nations forces in Korea from January to June 1951.

=== 1951–1954 ===
On 27 June 1951, Bugara returned to Pearl Harbor to enter the Pearl Harbor Naval Shipyard for her fourth overhaul. During this overhaul, she was converted for submarine snorkel operations and had a new, streamlined conning tower fairwater installed, the first time the Pearl Harbor Naval Shipyard undertook such work. Bugara completed her overhaul on 15 November 1951 and resumed local operations in Hawaiian waters. In May 1952, she departed Pearl Harbor for a cruise to Port Angeles, Washington; Seattle, Washington; Portland, Oregon; and Esquimalt, British Columbia, Canada. On 28 June 1952, she returned to Pearl Harbor and resumed operations off Oahu.

During an antisubmarine warfare exercise south of Barbers Point, Oahu, on 3 August 1952, Bugara came to periscope depth and saw a bow with the number "634" painted on it very close and approaching fast at 15 knots (28 km/h; 17 mph). It was the destroyer escort USS Whitehurst (DE-634), which collided with Bugara, damaging her upper sail and periscopes. Bugara returned to Pearl Harbor for repairs to her conning tower. According to Rick Farris, a former crew member on motor watch aboard Bugara during the collision, “The impact caused the boat to roll severely, take a steep down angle, and plunge deeper, giving every indication a forward compartment had flooded and we were headed to the bottom.” Damage control efforts stopped the flooding and Bugara managed to surface. “Damage was fairly serious,” Farris claimed. “The small pump room flooded, both [peri]scopes required replacement, the upper half of the sail and [periscope] shears needed extensive repairs…We were in the [ship]yard [for] several weeks and the cost was, I'm sure, substantial.”

After completing her repairs and conducting work-ups and local operations in Hawaiian waters from Pearl Harbor, Bugara visited Hilo, Hawaii, then entered the Pearl Harbor Naval Shipyard for an overhaul on 22 June 1953. After its completion, she departed Pearl Harbor on 23 October 1953 bound for Puget Sound in Washington, where she remained for the next two months. She then returned to Pearl Harbor, arriving there on 23 December 1953. Bugara departed Pearl Harbor on 6 April 1954, for her fifth deployment to the western Pacific. She returned to Pearl Harbor on 8 October 1954, and resumed the routine of rendering services to other types of naval units in Hawaiian waters. On 7 December 1954, she departed Pearl Harbor for San Diego, where she arrived on 15 December 1954.

=== 1955–1959 ===
On 26 May 1955, Bugara entered the Pearl Harbor Naval Shipyard for her sixth regular overhaul. The shipyard made extensive changes to provide improved habitability for the crew. Following the overhaul, her home port changed to San Diego on 1 August 1955, and she reported for duty there as a unit of Submarine Squadron 3. Throughout 1956, she rendered services in the San Diego area and participated in several special fleet exercises along the United States West Coast.

Bugara departed San Diego on 1 February 1957 for her sixth cruise to the western Pacific and took part in various exercises with the United States Seventh Fleet before returning to San Diego. She moved to San Francisco and began her seventh overhaul there. It lasted from 5 September 1957 to 19 March 1958. Upon its completion, she returned to San Diego and resumed local operations. In August 1958 she made another cruise to the Puget Sound area to operate in support of Naval Torpedo Station Keyport. Washington, and spend a weekend in Seattle during the local Seafair celebration.

On 7 January 1959, Bugara departed San Diego for her seventh cruise to the Western Pacific. During this six-month deployment, she visited several ports, including Buckner Bay and Naha on Okinawa; Subic Bay and Manila on Luzon in the Philippines; Hong Kong; and Yokosuka, Japan. Upon completion of the deployment, Bugara returned to San Diego on 2 July 1959. From 14 to 16 August 1959, she visited Long Beach, California, for submarine U.S. Naval Reserve submarine training cruises, then called at San Francisco from 24 to 25 October 1959.

=== 1960–1964 ===
On 11 April 1960, Bugara proceeded from San Diego to Puget Sound in Washington for a two-month deployment and operated with U.S. Navy units from Naval Air Station Whidbey Island on Whidbey Island, United States Coast Guard forces, and the Canadian Armed Forces. She also provided training services to U.S. Naval Reserve submarine units from Portland, Oregon, and Tacoma and Seattle, Washington, and she made port visits at Seattle, Tacoma, and Everett, Washington, and Victoria and Vancouver, British Columbia, Canada. On 25 May 1960, she departed Puget Sound en route San Francisco, where she made a two-day visit. She returned to San Diego on 12 June 1960.

From San Diego, Bugara resumed local operations. During most of July 1960, she participated in Exercise Meadowlark and Exercise Uppercut. On 24 September 1960, she proceeded to Hunters Point Naval Shipyard in San Francisco for an overhaul.

With her overhaul complete, Bugara made for Naval Torpedo Station, Keyport, Washington, on 2 February 1961 for a shakedown cruise and fire-control system checks. While in the Puget Sound area, she made recreational visits to Port Angeles, Washington, and Vancouver, British Columbia, Canada. On 13 February 1961, she departed Vancouver bound for San Diego, and after arriving there on 17 February 1961 she commenced refresher training. After the completion of refresher training in early March 1961, she began preparations for a Far East cruise and operations with the U.S. Seventh Fleet. During that cruise, she took part in three hunter-killer exercises, two fleet exercises, one antisubmarine warfare exercise with Republic of China Navy units, and one Republic of China Marine Corps landing exercise. She also made port calls at Yokosuka, Sasebo, and Hakodate, Japan; Kaohsiung on Taiwan; Manila and Subic Bay on Luzon in the Philippine Islands; Naha on Okinawa; Hong Kong; Midway Atoll in the Northwestern Hawaiian Islands; and Pearl Harbor. Bugara was awarded the Battle Efficiency "E" award as the outstanding ship in Submarine Division 31 for fiscal year 1961, which ran from 1 July 1960 to 30 June 1961. On 17 December 1961, she returned to San Diego.

From 1 January to 26 April 1962, Bugara participated in operations off San Diego. On 30 April 1962 she arrived in Seattle for a five-day stay to participate in the Century 21 Exposition, also known as the Seattle World′s Fair, and to allow her crew to enjoy shore leave. On 5 May 1962, she got underway for San Diego, where she conducted local operations until 29 May 1962. From 30 May to 18 June 1962, she was in interim drydocking at San Diego, and for the remainder of 1962 operated just off San Diego except for a three-week trip to Pearl Harbor during November. For the second consecutive year, Bugara was awarded the Battle “E” as the outstanding submarine in Submarine Division 31 during the fiscal year 1962, which ran from1 July 1961 to 30 June 1962. She was also twice awarded the Fire Control Efficiency Award, presented for excellence in fire control and weapon performance during fiscal year 1962.

On 29 December 1962, Bugara departed San Diego for a seven-week operation in the Puget Sound area. She returned to San Diego on 20 February 1963. Following three weeks of upkeep, her crew painted a white hash mark on her sail signifying her third consecutive Battle “E” award, and she continued workups and other duties in the San Diego area. Her next overhaul period began at the Puget Sound Naval Shipyard in Bremerton, Washington, on 22 July 1963 and lasted until 11 February 1964.

After a brief workup and training period in the Pacific Ocean, Bugara was assigned duty with the U.S. Seventh Fleet for another deployment to the Western Pacific beginning on 16 April 1964. She stopped at Pearl Harbor to have main generators 1 and 2 replaced and reported back for duty with the Seventh Fleet on 26 May 1964. During her deployment, she provided services to aircraft and surface ships of the U.S. Navy, Republic of China Navy, and Philippine Navy.

=== Vietnam War ===
During Bugara′s Western Pacific deployment, the Gulf of Tonkin Incident of 2 and 4 August 1964 brought the United States into direct involvement in the Vietnam War. As a result of the incident, Bugara was assigned to Task Force 77 for operations in the South China Sea between 8 August and 4 September 1964. She arrived at San Diego on 22 October 1964, having traveled 24,000 nautical miles (44,400 km; 27,600 mi) during her deployment, making port calls at Cebu City on Cebu Island in the Visayas in the Philippines; Hong Kong; Subic Bay on Luzon in the Philippines, and Yokosuka, Japan. After returning to San Diego, Bugara commenced local operations until she entered Hunters Point Naval Shipyard and San Francisco for a battery renewal in June 1965. With it complete, she returned to San Diego.

Bugara left San Diego on 18 October 1965 for another cruise in support of U.S. Seventh Fleet operations off Vietnam. While en route, she stopped at Pearl Harbor, where she was completely outfitted with the Steinke hood device for escape from a disabled submarine. During her deployment, she also made port calls at Yokosuka, Japan; Buckner Bay, Okinawa; and Subic Bay in the Philippines. On 15 November 1965, she celebrated the 21st anniversary of her commissioning by making her 6,000th dive. By the end of 1965, she was at Subic Bay with the U.S. Seventh Fleet and during her deployment she conducted operations and training with units of the U.S., Philippine Navy, Japanese Maritime Self-Defense Force, and Republic of China Navy. On 1 May 1966, while transiting the Lombok Strait southbound to the Indian Ocean, Bugara honored her sister ship USS Bullhead (SS-332), lost on 6 August 1945 during World War II, with a wreath-laying ceremony. Bugara then made her first port visit to Fremantle, Australia, since August 1945, returning as the U.S. Pacific Fleet Submarine Force representative for the annual commemoration of Australia's celebration of the anniversary of the Battle of the Coral Sea, which had occurred during World War II from 4 to 8 May 1942. During her return voyage to the United States, Bugara crosseed the junction of the equator and International Date Line on 17 May 1966. She traveled 29,000 nautical miles (53,700 km; 33,400 mi) during her deployment.

Bugara began an overhaul at San Francisco's Hunter's Point Naval Shipyard in October 1966. After its completion on 25 April 1967, she conducted successful post-overhaul sea trials and shakedown from then until 20 May 1967. Immediately after shakedown, and until 15 June 1967, she visited the Dabob Bay Torpedo Testing Facility in Puget Sound for fire-control system checks and calibrations. From 15 June to 1 October 1967, she provided services to Eastern Pacific units assigned to Commander, United States First Fleet. During this training, she sank the decommissioned destroyer escort USS Currier (DE-700) as a target with a Mark 14 Mod. 5 torpedo in a war shot test. She also received the Battle “E” award again during this period. She then immediately began preparations for her own deployment to the Western Pacific with the U.S. Seventh Fleet.

From 17 October to 31 December 1967, Bugara was assigned to the Seventh Fleet. During her deployment, her eleventh to the Western Pacific, and before the end of 1967, she visited Pearl Harbor; Midway Atoll; Buckner Bay, Okinawa; Keelung, Taiwan; and Manila and Subic Bay in the Philippines. She also rendered services to the Japanese Self-Defense Force, the Republic of China Navy, and anti-submarine warfare aircraft of the U.S. Navy.

The beginning of 1968 found Bugara in Subic Bay, halfway through her deployment. As her deployment continued into 1968, she visited Bangkok, Thailand; Keelung and Kaohsiung, Taiwan; Hong Kong; and Yokosuka, Japan. During January 1968, she hosted several newsmen while operating in the Gulf of Tonkin off North Vietnam and was featured on American television in an episode of The Huntley–Brinkley Report on NBC. On 1 February 1968, her crew participated in a people-to-people program with the inhabitants of the island of Ko Samui, Thailand. During the visit the submariners distributed books, toys, vitamins, and athletic equipment and, in conjunction with the Royal Thai Navy, constructed basketball backboards and ping-pong tables. They concluded the one-day goodwill visit with a joint picnic and Hollywood movies for the islanders. While at Yokosuka, Japan, from 10 to 20 April 1968, Bugara hosted the crew of the British submarine HMS Rorqual. On 27 April 1968, Bugara departed Yokosuka, made a half-day stopover at Pearl Harbor, and proceeded to San Diego, which she reached on 16 May 1968.

From 16 May to 18 June 1968, Bugara underwent upkeep at San Diego. From 19 June to 1 August 1968 she provided services to Commander, Naval Air Forces, Pacific, and Commander Training Command, Pacific, and conducted individual ship exercises and additional underway training. On 2 August 1968, she conducted a dependents cruise for families and friends of her crew. A demonstration cruise followed for PACNARMID on 12–13 August. From 14 to 21 August 1968, Bugara participated in Strike Ex-68, a major fleet exercise off the coast of Southern California, and Commander, U.S. First Fleet, and Commander, Submarine Flotilla 1, both commended her for her performance during the exercise. She spent 22 August–16 September 1968 in port, engaged in submarine crew training, and providing services for Fleet Marine Force, Pacific. From 17 September to 10 October 1968, she underwent repairs at Campbell Machine Company in San Diego, with post-repair sea trials conducted on 10 October. From 22 to 25 October 1968, she provided services for the submarine USS Gurnard (SSN-662) off San Francisco, followed by a one-day visit to San Francisco. On 30 October 1968, she conducted a demonstration cruise for Pacific Southwest Airlines employees at San Diego. From 6 to 7 November 1968, she again provided services for Gurnard off San Francisco. She spent the remainder of 1968 in port except for seven days of training and individual ship's exercises at sea.

From 1 to 26 January 1969, Bugara conducted workups off Southern California, in preparation for another deployment to the Western Pacific. Underway from 27 January to 26 February 1969, en route from San Diego, she proceeded to Pearl Harbor before passing through San Bernardino Strait in the Philippines for a port visit at Subic Bay on Luzon. Other ports she visited during her cruise included Manila; Hong Kong; Bangkok and Sattahip, Thailand; and Kaoshiung, Taiwan. From 19 February to 20 July 1969 she was assigned as a unit of the U.S. Seventh Fleet. This period was highlighted by 33 days of services on Yankee Station, including participation in the Southeast Asia Treaty Organization (SEATO) exercise Sea Spirit with units of the U.S. Navy, Royal Australian Navy, Royal New Zealand Navy, British Royal Navy, Philippine Navy, and Royal Thai Navy. She also provided services for the Seventh Fleet off the coast of Vietnam. On 1 July 1969, Bugara was reclassified as an auxiliary submarine with the new hull classification symbol AGSS-331 for the period she served on Yankee Station.

On 20 July 1969, Bugara receuved orders to proceed to Yokosuka, Japan, and then to San Diego, where she arrived on 4 August 1969. From 5 August to 14 November 1969, she participated in Fleet Exercise StrikeEx 4-69 and provided services to various units of the U.S. First Fleet. On 1 October, her hull classification symbol reverted to SS-331. On 2 October 1969, she departed San Diego for the Puget Sound area to render services to the submarine USS Blueback (SS-581). While in the vicinity, she also provided assistance to Canadian air and surface units from 7 to 9 October 1969.

Bugara entered the Mare Island Naval Shipyard on 14 November 1969 and celebrated her 25th anniversary of commissioning on 15 November while preparing for interim drydocking. At the shipyard, she accomplished a battery renewal that was completed on 3 December 1969. She then returned to San Diego for Christmas holiday leave and upkeep.

== Decommissioning ==
During 1970, the U.S. Navy deemed the five remaining Fleet Snorkel submarines — Bugara, USS Carbonero (SS-337), USS Medregal (SS-480), USS Sabalo (SS-302), and USS Segundo (SS-398) — "far below the standards of a Guppy III submarine" and prohibitively expensive to modernize. The Board of Inspection and Survey found Bugara unfit for further naval service and recommended she be stricken from the Naval Vessel Register.

Bugara was decommissioned on 1 October 1970 and stricken from the Naval Vessel Register the same day. She was transferred from the custody of Commander, Submarine Group, San Francisco Bay Area, to that of Commanding Officer, Inactive Ship Facility, Mare Island Naval Shipyard. She was selected for sinking as a target along with the decommissioned attack cargo ships USS Warrick (AKA-89) and USS Whiteside (AKA-90) in tests of the Mark 48 torpedo off the coast of Washington. The testing schedule originally called for the submarine USS Trigger (SS-564) to sink Bugara sometime during the week of 23 May 1971, but at the beginning of June 1971 the test had not yet been carried out and Bugara remained afloat.

== Loss ==
On 1 June 1971, Bugara, with no crew aboard, was under tow by the fleet tug USS Cree (ATF-84) to Bangor Naval Ammunition Depot at Bangor, Washington, when Cree′s crew noticed Bugara′s trim change rapidly. Cree slowed to heave a tow line at a distance of 1,750 feet (533 m), and although her towing detail was fully manned at the time, the wire towing Bugara slipped out of the brake. Suddenly, Bugara′s bow rose sharply at 13:58 and she sank rapidly, disappearing beneath the surface at 14:00 in 165 fathoms (990 ft; 302 m) of water near Cape Flattery, Washington. At risk of being pulled down with Bugara, Cree cut the steel hawser tow cable.

== Wreck ==
The wreck of Bugara lies under about 800 feet (240 m) of water in the Olympic Coast National Marine Sanctuary. The remotely operated underwater vehicle Hercules, deployed by the research vessel EV Nautilus, used an underwater camera system to take photos of the wreck during an archaeological survey of it in 2007.

== Honors and awards ==
- Asiatic-Pacific Campaign Medal with three battle stars for World War II service
- World War II Victory Medal
- Navy Occupation Service Medal with "ASIA" clasp
- Korean Service Medal with two service stars for Korean War service
- Vietnam Service Medal with seven service stars for Vietnam War service
- Armed Forces Expeditionary Medal
