= USS Sennet =

Balao-class submarine

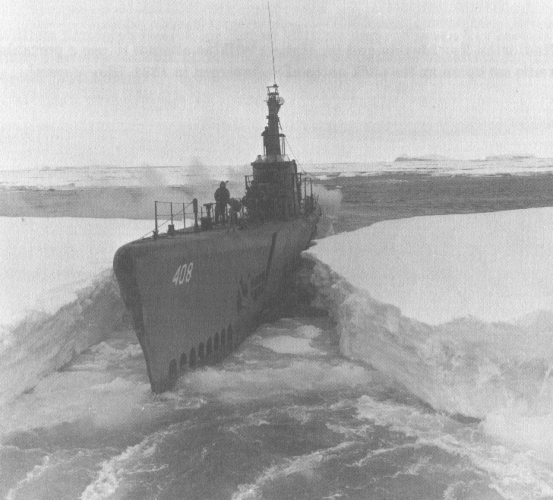
- Sennet (SS-408) in the Antarctic Ocean during Operation Highjump, 1946

History

United States
- Builder: Portsmouth Naval Shipyard, Kittery, Maine
- Laid down: 8 March 1944
- Launched: 6 June 1944
- Commissioned: 22 August 1944
- Decommissioned: 2 December 1968
- Stricken: 2 December 1968
- Fate: Sold for scrap, 15 June 1973

General characteristics
- Class & type: Balao class diesel-electric submarine
- Displacement: 1,526 tons (1,550 t) surfaced; 2,401 tons (2,440 t) submerged
- Length: 311 ft 8 in (95.00 m)
- Beam: 27 ft 3 in (8.31 m)
- Draft: 16 ft 10 in (5.13 m) maximum
- Propulsion: 4 × Fairbanks-Morse Model 38D8-⅛ 10-cylinder opposed piston diesel engines driving electrical generators; 2 × 126-cell Sargo batteries; 2 × low-speed direct-drive Elliott electric motors; two propellers; 5,400 shp (4.0 MW) surfaced; 2,740 shp (2.0 MW) submerged
- Speed: 20.25 knots (38 km/h) surfaced; 8.75 knots (16 km/h) submerged
- Range: 11,000 nautical miles (20,000 km) surfaced at 10 knots (19 km/h)
- Endurance: 48 hours at 2 knots (3.7 km/h) submerged; 75 days on patrol
- Test depth: 400 ft (120 m)
- Complement: 10 officers, 70–71 enlisted
- Armament: 10 × 21-inch (533 mm) torpedo tubes; 6 forward, 4 aft; 24 torpedoes; 1 × 5-inch (127 mm) / 25 caliber deck gun; Bofors 40 mm and Oerlikon 20 mm cannon

USS Sennet (SS-408) was a Balao-class submarine, a ship of the United States Navy named for the sennet, a barracuda.

Sennet was laid down on 8 March 1944 by the Portsmouth Navy Yard in Kittery, Maine, launched on 6 June 1944, sponsored by Mrs. Roscoe W. Downs, and commissioned on 22 August 1944.

Sennet was fitted out by 18 September. She held training exercises and torpedo-tube testing off the coast of Connecticut and Rhode Island until 22 October. The submarine then tested mines and torpedoes for the Mine Warfare Test Station, Solomons Island, Md. On 11 November, Sennet proceeded to the operations area off Balboa, C. Z. and conducted further training exercises. The submarine departed Balboa on 29 November for Pearl Harbor and arrived there on 16 December 1944.

Sennet's topside armament was increased to two 5-inch (130 mm) guns, two 40 millimeter guns, and three .50 caliber machine guns before departing Pearl Harbor for her first war patrol on 5 January 1945.

== First and second patrols, January–March 1945 ==
Sennet patrolled north of the Bonin Islands until 28 January. She made two attacks on a large tanker with three escorts on 21 January but scored no hits. The following week, the submarine sank one 500-ton picket boat and damaged another.

Sennet refitted at Saipan from 31 January to 7 February, when she began her second war patrol off southern Honshū, Japan. On 13 February, two 300-ton picket boats were sunk by the combined gunfire of Sennet, Haddock (SS-231), and Lagarto (SS-371).

Three days later, the submarine attacked the minelayer Nariu with an offset spread of torpedoes from her stern tubes, then went deep to 200 feet (60 m). Two torpedoes were heard to explode. While going deep, Sennet was rocked hard by two aircraft bombs which exploded beneath her. The submarine surfaced an hour later and saw a large oil slick and approximately 40 Japanese clinging to debris but no trace of the Nariu which had sunk.

== Third and fourth patrols, April–August 1945 ==
Sennet was refitted by Apollo (AS-25) in Apra Harbor, Guam, 9 March – 2 April. Patrolling off Honshū again from 3 April to 16 May, she was twice straddled by torpedoes fired from patrol boats while she was surfaced off Miki Saki on 16 April. Three days later, the submarine torpedoed and sank the cargo ship Hagane Maru. On 22 April, Sennet attempted to save a P-51 pilot who had bailed out near her but the man went under only 100 feet (30 m) from the ship. Attempts to find him were in vain.

A repair ship was attacked on 28 April with two electrical torpedoes. The first blew the bow off and the second hit under the mainmast. Hatsushima sank by her stern. On 1 May, Sennett fired five steam torpedoes at an Asashio-class destroyer but it maneuvered and avoided them. At the end of this patrol, the submarine sailed to Pearl Harbor for upkeep and leave.

Sennet's most profitable patrol was from 1 July to 9 August in the Sea of Japan. During the patrol, she sank one passenger-cargo ship, two cargo ships, and one tanker totaling 13,105 tons.

== 1945–1951 ==
When the war ended in the Pacific, Sennet was assigned to the Atlantic Fleet and operated from New London, Conn. In June 1946, she was reassigned to Submarine Squadron 6 (SubRon 6) at Balboa, C.Z. From 10 December 1946 to 13 March 1947, Sennet participated in Operation Highjump, the third Byrd Antarctic Expedition. Sennet used the first basic under-ice sonar to establish the feasibility of United States under-ice operations.

Sennet operated from Balboa until 1949 when she was assigned to operate from Key West, Fla., as a unit of Submarine Squadron 12 (SubRon 12). The ship conducted training for submarine and antisubmarine personnel at Key West and Guantanamo Bay, Cuba. In 1951, Sennet was converted to a Fleet Snorkel submarine at the Philadelphia Naval Shipyard and returned to her homeport.

== 1954–1973 ==
On 4 November 1954, Sennet departed Key West on her first deployment to the Mediterranean and service with the 6th Fleet. From her return on 30 January 1955 until 1 August 1959, the submarine conducted training, local, and fleet operations with her squadron. On 1 August, Sennett was reassigned to SubRon 4 and stationed at Charleston, S.C. For the next nine years, the submarine operated from Charleston with the Atlantic Fleet. She operated along the east coast, in the Caribbean, and in the Atlantic with her squadron until mid-1968.

In November 1968, the submarine was found unfit for further Naval service. Sennet was struck from the Navy list on 2 December 1968. On 18 May 1973, her hulk was sold to Southern Scrap Material Co. Ltd., New Orleans, La.

== Awards ==
- Asiatic-Pacific Campaign Medal with four battle stars
- World War II Victory Medal
- Navy Occupation Medal with "EUROPE" clasp
- National Defense Service Medal with star
- Antarctica Service Medal
