= HMS Athlete (W 150) =

Favourite-class tugboat of the Royal Navy

History

United Kingdom
- Builder: Levingston Shipbuilding Company, Orange, Texas
- Launched: 18 May 1943
- Commissioned: 15 November 1943
- Stricken: 17 September 1945
- Fate: Mined and sunk off Leghorn 17 July 1945

General characteristics
- Displacement: 852 tons light
- Length: 143 ft (44 m)
- Beam: 33 ft 10 in (10.31 m)
- Draught: 13 ft 2 in (4.01 m)
- Propulsion: two GM 12-278A Diesel-electric engines single propeller, 1,500 SHP
- Speed: 13 knots (24 km/h; 15 mph)
- Complement: 45
- Armament: 1 x 3"/50 caliber gun

HMS Athlete (W 150) was a Favourite-class tugboat of the Royal Navy during World War II.

== Service history ==
Athlete was laid down in early 1943 at Levingston Shipbuilding Company in Orange, Texas as ATR-92, launched 18 May 1943 and commissioned into the Royal Navy under the Lend-Lease Act on 15 November 1943. Athlete served in the Mediterranean Fleet and was mined and sunk off Leghorn on 17 July 1945.
