= Kaanchli Life in a Slough =

2020 Indian film directed by Dedipya Joshii

Kaanchli: Life in a Slough
- Theatrical release poster
- Directed by: Dedipya Joshii
- Screenplay by: Dedipya Joshii; Kailash Detha
- Story by: Vijaydan Detha
- Based on: "Kenchuli" by Vijaydan Detha
- Produced by: Dedipya Joshii; Shobha Devi
- Starring: Sanjay Mishra; Shikha Malhotra
- Cinematography: Jogendra Panda
- Edited by: Aseem Sinha
- Production company: Pisceann Pictures
- Distributed by: AJ Media Corporation; Carnival Cinemas
- Release date: 7 February 2020
- Running time: 102 minutes
- Country: India
- Languages: Hindi; Rajasthani

Kaanchli: Life in a Slough is a 2020 Indian period drama film that was produced and directed by Dedipya Joshii, and stars Sanjay Mishra, Shikha Malhotra, Lalit Parimoo and Nareshpal Singh Chauhan. The film was co-produced by Shobha Devi and presented by Anup Jalota. It is based on a story by Vijaydan Detha, a folk-story writer from Rajasthan, India, whose stories have been adapted into many films including Shah Rukh Khan's Paheli. Kaanchli, whose theme is social welfare, tells the story of a strong, self-reliant woman's struggle for survival.

The film was released on 7 February 2020 at Carnival Cinemas.

== Plot ==
The film is based on a story of folklorist Vijadan Detha. Kishnu is married to a beautiful woman named Kajri, towards whom Thakur, a resident of the village, has bad intentions. Thakur asks his right-hand man Bhoja to get Kajri for him. Kajri, however, is loyal to her husband and one day attacks Thakur in self-defence. Rather than praising her, Kishnu warns Kajri to not behave in this manner with Thakur again. Heartbroken and stubborn, Kajri tries to get a reaction from her husband by entering into an extramarital affair with another man, Bhoja. Bhoja falls in love with Kajri, which gives her the idea to test Kishnu using Bhoja just to see her husband's reaction.

== Cast ==
- Sanjay Mishra as Bhoja
- Shikha Malhotra as Kajri
- Lalit Parimoo as Thakur
- Nareshpal Singh Chouhan as Kishnu

== Production ==
=== Development ===
The official announcement of the film was made in June 2018. Dedipya Joshii had been working on the script since 2008. After reading "Kenchuli" by Vijaydan Detha, he decided to make a film based on it and started writing the first draft. Dedipya was satisfied with his fourth draft and sent a copy of it to Detha, who invited Joshii to his house in Borunda, Jodhpur. Joshii stayed with Detha for few days, getting to know him personally. Detha happily gave Joshii the rights of his story '"Kenchuli"' with a compliment saying after reading the script and talking over the phone with Joshii, he had assumed he was older and experienced in filmmaking. After meeting Joshii, Detha was surprised to see an enthusiastic young man. As soon as Joshii returned to Mumbai, he started working to produce the story into a feature film. After a few days, Detha wrote an affectionate, hopeful letter to Joshii saying:

Dear Dedipya, I Have decided to give you the rights to make this story which is very close to my heart after seeing the transparency within your soul through which you perceive things and execute them in your film making as well as in real life with your immense honesty and I hope that the transparency of your soul could reach to the people when you will present "Kenchuli" on the silver screen, Best wishes.

— Vijaydan Detha to Dedipya Joshii, director of Kaanchli Life in a Slough

=== Casting ===
Joshii first cast Shikha Malhotra as Kajri and then approached the in-demand actor Sanjay Mishra to play Bhoja, who accepted the offer. Later, Joshii cast Narespal Singh Chouhan as Kishnu and Lalit Parimoo as Thakur in the film.

=== Filming ===
The principal photography of the film commenced in the November 2018 but during that time, Sanjay Mishra had to travel to the Busan International Film Festival for his forthcoming film Kaamyaab and the filming schedule of Kaanchli was postponed for a month. Filming began on 7 December 2018 in the interiors of Rajasthan, which is extremely cold at that time of the year. This led to lead female actor Shikha Malhotra having to shoot rainy scenes for the film's climax for three consecutive nights at a temperature of 2 °C (36 °F) from 1 to 3 January 2019. Filming was completed on 4 January 2019.

=== Release ===
Kaanchli had its Indian box-office release on 7 February 2020.

== Awards ==
Cinema Aajtak Achievers Award - March 2020:

- Won – Best Debut (Female)
