= Madhukar C. Dhas =

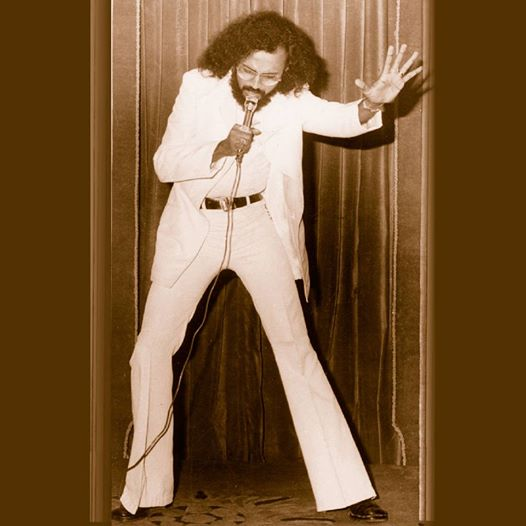
- Madhukar C. Dhas was the original singer of one of India's premier Rock and Roll bands, Atomic Forest
- Born: Ebenezer Madhukar Chandra Dhas; October 25, 1949; India
- Died: April 17, 2024 (aged 74); Philadelphia, USA
- Other names: Madhukar Dhas, Madhu Dhas, Madooo, Madhukar Chandra Das
- Relatives: Sophia Chandra Dhas (wife), Aiesha Chandra Dhas (daughter), Devasahayam Manohar Chandra Dhas (brother), John Sudhakar Chandradhas (brother), Dheena Chandra Dhas (brother)
- Musical career
- Origin: Madras, Tamil Nadu, India
- Genres: Rock and Roll, Psychedelic rock, Gospel
- Occupations: Singer, songwriter, record producer, art director
- Instruments: Guitar, Singing,
- Years active: 1960s–present
- Label: MADOOO Records
- Formerly of: The Voodoos, Atomic Forest
- Website: bigdooker.com archived

Madhukar C. Dhas aka Madhu Dhas & Madooo, born Madhukar Chandra Dhas (25 October 1949 - April 17, 2024), was a singer, songwriter and performer of Indian origin, based in New York City. He was best known for his performances as the lead singer of the Indian Rock band Atomic Forest in the 1970s, and for his portrayal of Jesus in Alyque Padamsee's production of Jesus Christ Superstar.

He was the elder brother of singer and actor, Dheena Chandra Dhas.

== Biography ==
=== Early Years – Madras, India ===
Madhukar grew up in Madras (now known as Chennai), India, where he was raised in a strong Christian tradition. His father expected him to become a doctor but he was influenced by, and played covers of the music of The Troggs, The Turtles, The Kinks, The Rolling Stones, The Beatles, The Electric Prunes and The Doors among others, when in school.

He formed a band, "The Voodoos", with classmate Sukumar Nambiar, son of actor M. N. Nambiar at MCCS and while attending Madras Christian College. With The Voodoos, Madhukar played in college festivals and competitions. He also became interested in art at this time which led to his advertising career later.

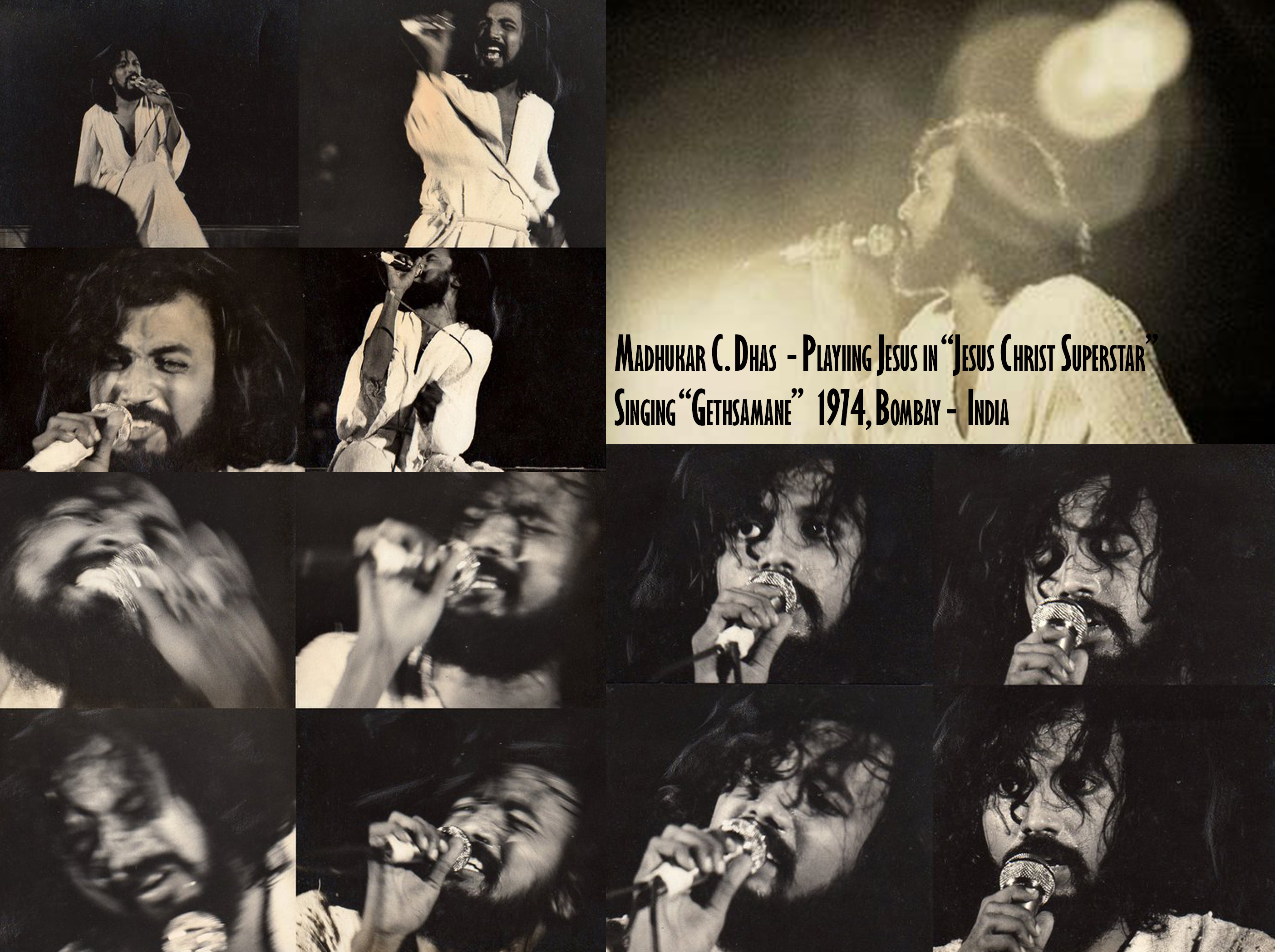
Madhukar as Jesus in Jesus Christ Superstar. Bombay, 1974.

=== Move to Bombay – Atomic Forest ===
After school and college, he moved to Bombay, working for advertising agencies such as Interpub and Lintas:India as an Art Director.

While continuing to work in advertising, Madhukar led one of India's premier Rock and Roll bands of the day, Atomic Forest in 1972 as their male vocalist, with Neel Chattodpadyaya on lead guitar, Keith Kanga on bass guitar and Valentine Lobo on drums. in 1972.

Atomic Forest performed at The Sneha Yatra Festival (aka) 'The Indian Woodstock' and were regular fixtures at prominent clubs and discos such as Slip Disc, Blow Up at The Taj Mahal Palace Hotel and Hell at Hotel Hilltop in Mumbai. Their album Obsession '77 was re-released in 2011.

After leaving Atomic Forest, he began performing solo at 5-star hotels in India as a spot singer and overseas at Oberoi Lanka and then on to Hotels in South East Asia en route to the USA. Madhukar sang in the presence of Prime Minister Indira Gandhi in Mumbai.

He also sang jingles in a vast array of commercials one of which was for Close-Up toothpaste that played across India at all movie houses for 8 years.

=== Acting ===
The Creative Director of his at Lintas:India, Alyque Padamsee, who was also a theatrical producer, cast Madhukar in the title role of his 1974 production of the musical 'Jesus Christ Superstar' as Jesus opposite Nandu Bhende's Judas. The show ran to packed houses at Birla Hall.

Madhukar performed the role for a year and a half, which shot him to stardom as India's leading Male Vocalist. Madhukar and Nandu were selected from over 100 singers who auditioned for the roles. This production is considered a hallmark in Indian Rock Opera and theatre performances in general, and the director is working on a new production to commemorate 40 years since the original.

Sidharth Bhatia's book on Indian Rock music in the 1960s and 70s, entitled "India Psychedelic – The Story of a Rocking Generation " has quite a few pages dedicated to Madhukar Dhas.

=== Move to the United States ===
In 1978, he moved to the United States, settling in New York, where he again worked in advertising with agencies such as Bozell Worldwide and Deutsch Inc., while also pursuing his musical interests. He seasonally performed at Beatlesfests across the U.S. and Canada.

== Solo albums ==
In 2002, he self-released his first album, 'This Day Is Forever', containing "The 9/11 Memorial Song". He produced his 2nd album under indie label MADOOO Records, a Beatles tribute disc called "To the 'Fab Four' from Liverpool ... A Tribute from India", in 2004.

Some of his original songs can be heard on his 1st album, 'This day is forever'. His original songs and The Beatles tribute CD are all re-arranged in a unique fusion style of Western Rock n' Roll and Indian percussion sounds. His originals are written and performed again with that same fusion of Indian and Rock n' Roll music.

== Discography ==
=== As Madooo ===
==== This Day is Forever (2002) ====
1. This Day Is Forever – Radio Mix
2. America Forever
3. The Times They Are A-Changin' (Bob Dylan)
4. A Dose of You
5. I'll Be Myself
6. With a Little Help from My Friends (Lennon-McCartney)
7. Follow Me
8. "Love Me Do" (Lennon-McCartney)
9. I'll Be By Your Side
10. I Need You Baby
11. "Got to Get You into My Life" (Lennon-McCartney)
12. I Only Want to Say (Gethsemane) From Jesus Christ Superstar
13. Help Me Get Home
14. This Day Is Forever – Extended Mix

==== To The "Fab Four" From Liverpool ... A Tribute From India (2004) ====
1. Norwegian Wood 4:59
2. You've Got To Hide Your Love Away 3:38
3. Ob-la-di Ob-la-da 3:53
4. If I Needed Someone 2:57
5. You Can't Do That 3:39
6. Love Me Do 3:27
7. Got To Get You into My Life 4:51
8. Across The Universe 3:52
9. With A Little Help From My Friends 3:56
10. I Saw Her Standing There 4:27
11. Things We Said Today 3:23
12. John Lennon Tribute-Imagine/GivePeace/Watchin' the Wheels 5:23
13. Norwegian Wood – Radio Edit 3:58
14. Got To Get You into My Life – Radio Edit 4:08
15. I Saw Her Standing There – Radio Edit 3:39
16. John Lennon Tribute – Radio Edit 4:33

=== With Atomic Forest ===
==== Obsession ====
1. Obsession '77 (Fast) – 5:49
2. Locomotive Breath – 3:58
3. Mary Long – 3:45
4. Sunshine Day – 5:01
5. I Saw Her Standing There – 5:37
6. Obsession '77 (Slow) – 3:22
7. Butterfly Version 1 – 3:30
8. Theme From The Godfather – 4:34
9. Windmills of Your Mind – 2:57
10. Theme From The Fox – 4:48
11. Butterfly Version 2 – 3:28
12. Booboo Lullaby – 6:19
13. Man, You're Not Number One – 3:05
14. Travel On – 4:09
15. Jeff Beck Excerpt – 1:16
16. Gethsemane (I Only Want To Say) – 3:46
17. Foxy Lady – 7:01
