= Lalit Parimoo =

Indian film and television actor (born 1964)

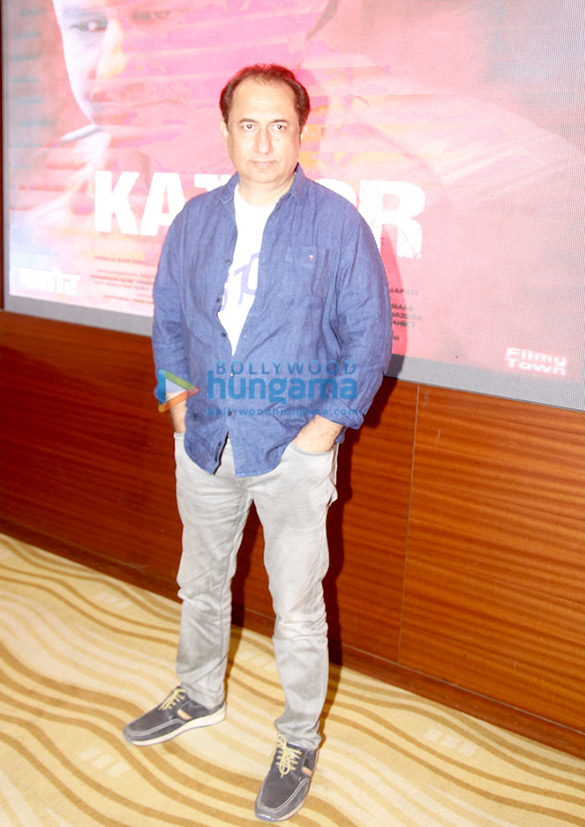
- Parimoo in 2018 at trailer launch of his film Kathor
- Born: 28 September 1964 (age 61); Jammu and Kashmir, India
- Occupation: Actor
- Years active: 1987 – present
- Notable work: Dr. Jaikaal in Shaktimaan; Pervez Lone/Polonius in Haider

Lalit Parimoo is an Indian film and television actor. He is best known for playing the scientist "Dr. Jaikaal" in the superhero series Shaktimaan (1997). Besides Parimoo has acted in a number of Bollywood films, including Haider (2014), where his role was praised critically and as a professor in Agent Vinod (2012). Parimoo has also written a book titled Main Manushya Hoon (I Am a Human).

== Filmography ==
=== Films ===
- Kaanchli (2020), as Thakur, Director- Dedipya Joshii
- Sita (2019), as Lawyer, Director- Teja
- Kathor (2018), as Neelkanth Chaturvedi, Director- Karan Kashyap
- What Will People Say (2017), as Uncle, Director- Iram Haq
- Panchlait (2017), Director- Prem Prakash Modi
- Mubarakan (2017), as Paramjeet Jijaji, Director- Anees Bazmee
- Haider (2014) as Pervez Lone (Polonius), Director- Vishal Bharadwaj
- Agent Vinod (2012) as Professor, Director- Sriram Raghavan
- Hum Tum Pe Marte Hain (1999), Director- Nabh kumar
- Hazaar Chaurasi Ki Maa (1998), Director- Govind Nihlani
- Ghoonghat (1997), Director- Chinni Prakash
- Sanshodhan (1996) as Indra Singh, Director- Govind Nihlani
- Nirmaan (1987), Director- Arun Jaitly
- Khufiya (2023) as Home Minister, Narendra Devendra Mishra
- Songs of Paradise (2025), as Bhan
- Match Fixing (2025), as Ranvijay Singh

=== Television ===
- Tumahe liye 1988 seriel on Doordarshan based on novel of Himashu Joshi
- Palash ke phool 1987 seriel on doordarshan based on story "Ha, lal palash ke phool dubara na la sakunga", by Sooryabala
- Kapaal Kundala 1992 Doordarshan
- Maila Anchal 1994 Doordarshan
- Meerabai 1997, Doordarshan
- Rangrezan
- Aahat Season 1 (1995-2001) Episode 76/77-MMM 1857 Episode 196/197 - The Last Reel
- Meerabai, doordarshan 1997 as father of Meerabai
- Shaktimaan (1998) as Dr. Jaikaal
- Saaya (Indian TV series) as Police Inspector Makhija
- Kora Kagaz (1998-1999)
- Virat (1997-1998)
- Kangan (2001) as Paritosh
- CID (2002)
- Rishtey (2002) as Thakur (segment: Karan)
- Remix (2004) as Principal Ashish Jambhwal
- Shaka Laka Boom Boom as acharya Odin, Principal of High School (2004)
- Kabhie To Nazar Milao (2006)
- Jhoome Jiiya Re (2007) as Mahesh Sabharwal
- Sunaina (2008) as Principal Shastri
- Kesariya Balam Aavo Hamare Des (2009) as Megh Singh
- Madhubala Ek Ishq Ek Junoon(2012) as Guruji
- Palash Ke Phool, produced by Asha Parekh (Year somewhere around 1989, “Jab Jab mere Ghar Aana Tum, Phool Palash ke le aana…”)
- Crime Patrol Dial 100 Episode 713/714 as Premraj
- Scam 1992 - The Harshad Mehta Story (2020) as CBI Director
- Charlie Chopra & The Mystery Of Solang Valley (2023) as Prof. Mohan Rawat

== Bibliography ==
- Parimoo, Lalit. Mai Manushya Hun (Hindi). Anuradha Prakashan. ISBN 93-82339-24-8.
