= Khoobsurat (1999 film) =

1999 Indian film by Sanjay Chhel

- Film poster
- Directed by: Sanjay Chhel
- Written by: Sanjay Chhel
- Produced by: Rahul Sughand
- Starring: Sanjay Dutt; Urmila Matondkar
- Cinematography: Madhu Ambat
- Edited by: Aseem Sinha
- Music by: Jatin–Lalit; Sukhwinder Singh; Narayan Parshuram
- Release date: 26 November 1999
- Country: India
- Language: Hindi
- Budget: ₹4.50 crore
- Box office: ₹15.51 crore

Khoobsurat (transl. Beautiful) is a 1999 Indian Hindi-language romantic comedy film written and directed by Sanjay Chhel and produced by Rahul Sughand. It stars Sanjay Dutt and Urmila Matondkar alongside an ensemble supporting cast, including Paresh Rawal, Om Puri, Farida Jalal and Anjan Srivastav.

Inspired by the English play The Rainmaker, Khoobsurat opened to mixed reviews from critics and proved to be a moderate commercial success. It was also the second collaboration between Dutt and Matondkar after Ram Gopal Varma's Daud (1997).

== Plot ==
The film follows Sanjay “Sanju” Shastri, a small-time con man with a fundamentally good heart. After getting into trouble with smuggler Jogia Seth, to whom he owes ₹50 lakhs, Sanju is given a month to repay the debt or face dire consequences. The situation worsens when Gudia, an orphaned girl, is taken hostage to ensure his compliance.

Sanju’s luck shifts when his friend Natwar suggests an elaborate con: posing as “Sanju Shastri,” a long-lost NRI relative the wealthy Chaudhary family has never met. With no other options, Sanju assumes the identity and successfully gains entry into the Chaudhary household.

The family consists of three brothers — the upright and responsible Dilip, the gambling-prone Mahesh, and the absent-minded Satish. Sanju quickly wins over the family by resolving their personal conflicts, particularly helping Dilip’s insecure daughter Shivani find confidence and self-worth. As bonds deepen, Sanju and Shivani fall in love.

However, Sanju’s deception is eventually exposed when he’s caught attempting to flee. In the end, he confronts and defeats Jogia, sets things right, and earns redemption — bringing the story to a traditional happily-ever-after.

== Cast ==
- Sanjay Dutt — Sanjay Shastri (Sanju)
- Urmila Matondkar — Shivani Chaudhary
- Paresh Rawal - Jogia Seth
- Om Puri — Dilip Chaudhary
- Farida Jalal — Sudha Chaudhary (Dadiji)
- Anjan Srivastav — Dinanath Chaudhary (Dadaji)
- Ashok Saraf — Mahesh Chaudhary
- Himani Shivpuri — Savita (Mahesh's wife)
- Jatin Kanakia — Satish Chaudhary
- Supriya Pilgaonkar Ratna (Satish's wife)
- Johnny Lever — Natwar (Sanju's friend)
- Dinesh Hingoo

== Box office ==
Released on a total of 185 screens in India, Khoobsurat took an initial of ₹48 lakh. By the end of its run, it did a worldwide business of ₹15.51 crore to emerge an "average" fare.

== Soundtrack ==
Khoobsurat

Soundtrack album by Jatin–Lalit, Sukhwinder Singh and Narayan Parshuram
- Released: October 1999
- Genre: Feature film soundtrack
- Length: 47:00
- Label: T-Series

The film's soundtrack was composed by Jatin–Lalit, Sukhwinder Singh and Narayan Parshuram, with lyrics penned by Gulzar, Sanjay Chhel and Sukhwinder Singh. The songs, "Mera Ek Sapna Hai", "Ghoonghat Mein Chaand" and "Bahut Khoobsurat Ho" were popular among the masses.

#	Title	Singer(s)	Music director(s)	Lyricist(s)
1	"Bahut Khoobsurat Ho"	Abhijeet Bhattacharya, Neerja Pandit	Jatin–Lalit	Gulzar
2	"Aye Shivani"	Sanjay Dutt, Shradha Pandit	Jatin–Lalit	Sanjay Chhel
3	"Mera Ek Sapna Hai"	Kumar Sanu, Kavita Krishnamurthy	Jatin–Lalit	Sanjay Chhel
4	"Ghash Khake Ho Gaya"	Sukhwinder Singh	Sukhwinder Singh	Sukhwinder Singh
5	"Ghoonghat Mein Chaand"	Kumar Sanu, Kavita Krishnamurthy	Jatin–Lalit	Sanjay Chhel
6	"Aana Zara Paas To Aa"	Kumar Sanu, Anuradha Paudwal	Jatin–Lalit	Gulzar
7	"Azmale Ye Formule"	Abhijeet Bhattacharya, Shradha Pandit	Jatin–Lalit	Gulzar
8	"Barse Kyon Barsaat"	Narayan Parshuram, Sanjivani	Narayan Parshuram	Sanjay Chhel
9	"Mantra of Khoobsurat"	Narayan Parshuram	Narayan Parshuram	Sanjay Chhel
10	"Main Adhuri Si"	Anuradha Paudwal	Jatin–Lalit	Sanjay Chhel
