= Raisa Padamsee =

French film actress

- Born: Rochefort, France
- Occupation: Film actress
- Known for: Duvidha
- Spouse: Laurent Brégeat
- Parent(s): Akbar Padamsee; Solange Gunelle
- Relatives: Alyque Padamsee (uncle); Shazahn Padamsee (cousin); Sharon Prabhakar (aunt)

Raisa Padamsee is a French actress, who acted in the Indian auteur Mani Kaul's 1973 Hindi film Duvidha.

== Early life ==
Raisa is the only daughter of an Indian-French couple, the painter Akbar Padamsee and Solange Gounelle. She was named by M. F. Hussain, whose daughter is named Raisa, as well.

== Career ==
She played the protagonist in the critically acclaimed film Duvidha that won best director's national award and Critics Award for Best Film at the 1974 Filmfare Awards. Raisa did not know a word of Hindi and only spoke French, when she played the role of the silent bride in the movie.

== Personal life ==
Raisa did not act in any more movies after her debut movie, and went back to Paris where she now lives with her family. Her husband Laurent Brégeat is a filmmaker.

Theater personality and ad film maker Alyque Padamsee is her paternal uncle. He was married to the singer and actress Sharon Prabhakar. Their daughter and Raisa's cousin Shazahn Padamsee too is an actress.
