= Shazahn Padamsee =

Indian film and stage actress, model (born 1987)

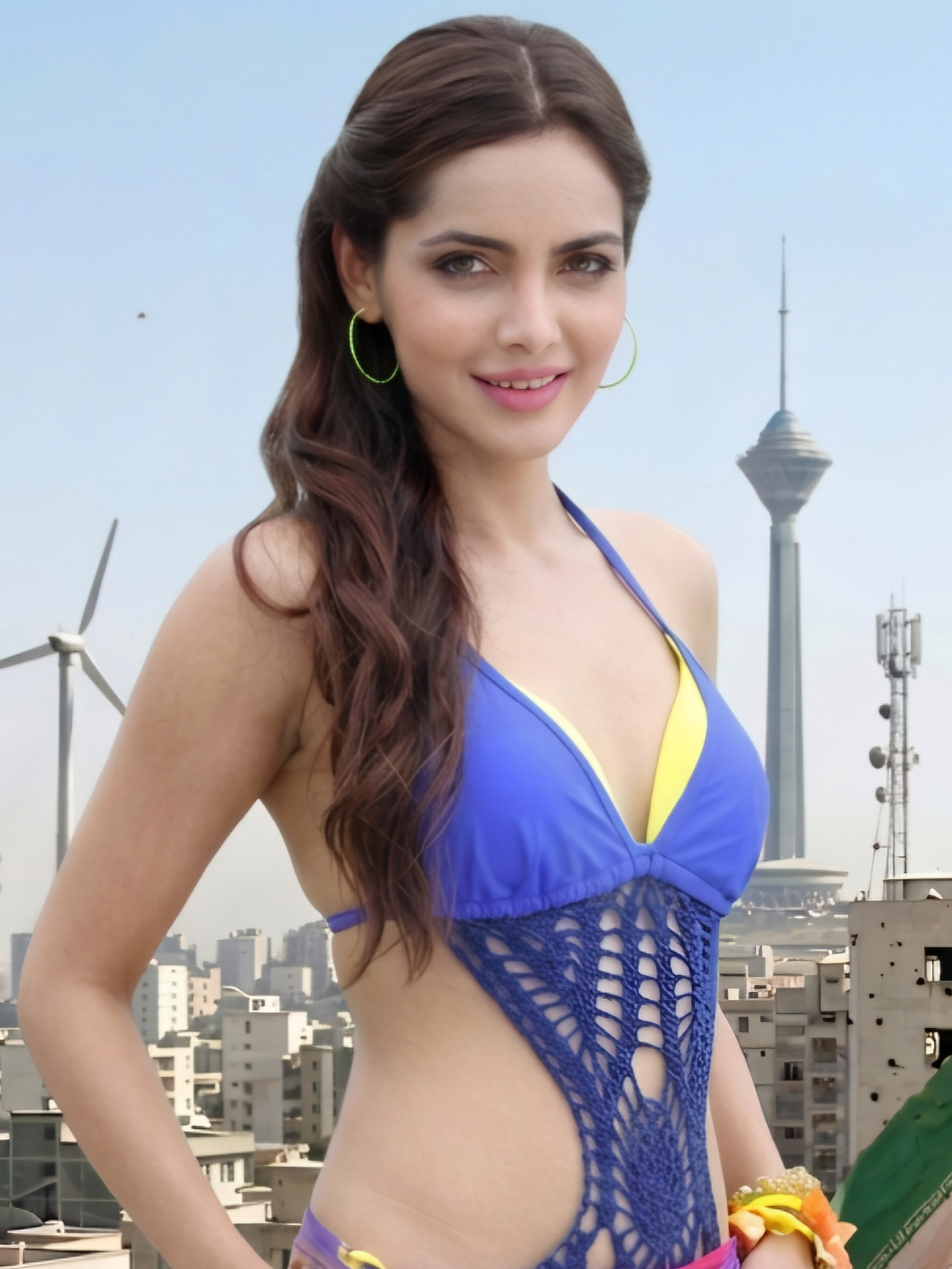
- Born: 18 October 1987 (age 39); Mumbai, Maharashtra, India
- Occupations: Actress; theatre artist; model; singer
- Years active: 2009–2015, 2023–present
- Spouse: Ashish Kanakia (m. 2025)
- Parent(s): Alyque Padamsee; Sharon Prabhakar
- Relatives: Akbar Padamsee (uncle); Raisa Padamsee (cousin); Quasar Thakore-Padamsee (half-brother)

Shazahn Padamsee Kanakia (born 18 October 1987) is an Indian actress and model who primarily works in Hindi and Telugu films. Daughter of noted actors Alyque Padamsee and Sharon Prabhakar, she made her first film appearance in the 2009 Hindi film Rocket Singh: Salesman of the Year. Padamsee's other notable roles were in the commercially successful films Orange (2010), Dil Toh Baccha Hai Ji (2011), Housefull 2 (2012) and Masala (2013).

== Early life and family ==
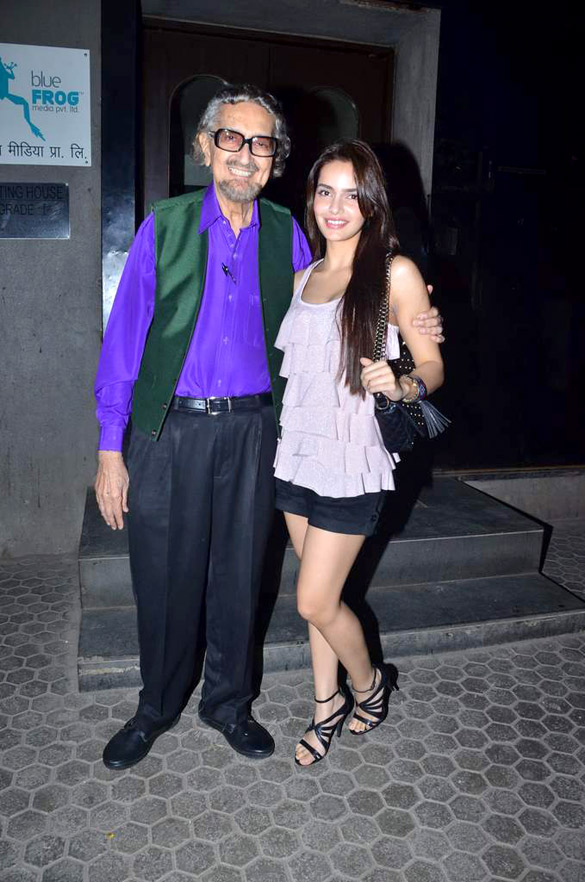
Padamsee with her father Alyque in May 2012

Padamsee's father Alyque Padamsee was a veteran theater actor who was born into a traditional family from the Kutch region of Gujarat. In 2011, Shahzahn revealed that she is inspired by Buddhism and is more spiritual than religious, adding, "I believe in God. But more so, I believe in all religions".

== Career ==
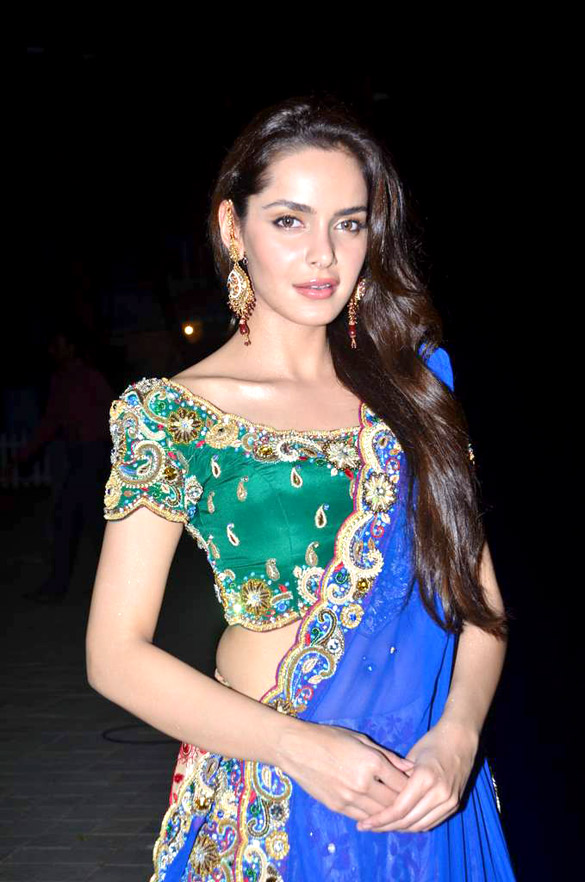
Padamsee in 2012

After appearances in several stage performances including her father's play Unspoken Dialogues, Shazahn Padamsee appeared in several national advertisements, whilst auditioning for roles in Hindi films. After a film with Vivek Vaswani failed to materialise, she successfully auditioned for the part in Yash Raj Films' Rocket Singh: Salesman of the Year opposite Ranbir Kapoor. Shazhan played Sherena in the film, the first customer who treats the titular character with respect during his job as a salesman. Although she played a leading female role, her screen-time was minimal leading to critics claiming that her role had little scope. The film opened to positive reviews, but the lack of publicity became a reason for it becoming a failure commercially at the box office.

Her second and third films were released on the same day, both being films in Tamil and Telugu respectively. In Kanimozhi, Shazahn played the role of Anu, a girl in the neighbourhood who the lead actor, played by Jai is nervous to express his feelings to. She had been approached after the director had looked through an online portfolio, and only signed after consent from her father. Upon release, the film gained mixed reviews with Shazahn's portrayal of her character being criticised. Critics claimed that she "looked pretty and was photographed well" but she could have "expressed more energy and expression" into her role, labelling her as a Barbie doll. However her Telugu film Orange garnered more positive reviews and Shazahn's portrayal of her role was better received by critics. Shazahn's character of Rooba, originally named after a song in the film, appeared in a flashback sequence as the girlfriend of the protagonist played by Ram Charan Teja. A critic said her performance was "a delight to watch" and that "Padamsee looks set for a long innings down South", whilst similar claims the critics from Sify and The Hindu claims that she "shines in her role" and that she "brings freshness to the screen".

Shazahn's first release of 2011 was the romantic comedy Dil Toh Baccha Hai Ji directed by Madhur Bhandarkar. The film portrayed her as June Pinto, an intern in an office whom an older divorced man, played by Ajay Devgn falls for. The film, which also featured Emraan Hashmi, Omi Vaidya, Shruti Haasan and Shraddha Das in other parallel roles, saw Shazahn indulge in heavy promotional work along with her co-stars. Shazahn's performance gaining mixed responses from critics with a reviewer citing that "looks like a doll and gets the character right" whilst another labelled hers as "the film's worst performance"; the film went on to become a commercial success at the box office. Shazahn's next release was Sajid Khan's Housefull 2, which featured her alongside an ensemble cast including Akshay Kumar, John Abraham, Zarine Khan, Asin and Jacqueline Fernandez. The film opened to mixed reviews with her role being described as "merely eye candy", but Housefull 2 went on to becoming the tenth film in history to cross ₹1 billion (US$10 million) and became one of the biggest commercial successes of 2012. She played a Gujarati girl in her 2015 film, Solid Patels. Her other project "Disco Valley" directed by Sajit Warrier in which she was appearing opposite Rajat Barmecha was a commercial failure.

Padamsee also worked on a live electronica project, SpanckMusic, with DJ Ankit "Ankytrixx" Kocher. She walked the ramp for Disha Vadgama (Fashion Designer) at Bombay Times Fashion Week 2022. In January 2023, Padamsee hosted the Sony WWE show, Super Dhamaal, alongside Sharman Joshi. She used her stage name "Sashaa Padamsee" for the first time. In October 2023, Padamsee starred in Aryan Ramasay's directorial film, “Pagalpan: Next Level” (previously titled Dream Big) which she shot in California, USA in December 2022. She played the wife of famous bodybuilder Gurarmaan's character. In 2025, Padamsee did an extended cameo appearance in the series Hai Junoon! opposite Neil Nitin Mukesh.

== Personal life ==
According to media reports, Tabloids in early 2010s linked her with cricketer Yuvraj Singh and later with actor Akhil Kapur, but she denied being romantically involved with either of them.

In November 2024, Shazahn became engaged to businessman Ashish Kanakia. They got married on 5 June 2025, in an intimate ceremony attended by family and close friends.

== Media image ==
In the Times 50 Most Desirable Women list, Padamsee was placed 37th in 2011.

== Filmography ==
=== Films ===
Year	Title	Role	Language	Notes	Ref.
2009	Rocket Singh: Salesman of the Year	Sherena Khanna	Hindi		
2010	Kanimozhi	Anu	Tamil		
2010	Orange	Rooba	Telugu		
2011	Dil Toh Baccha Hai Ji	June Pinto	Hindi		
2012	Housefull 2	Parul Patel Babani	Hindi		
2013	Masala	Meenakshi	Telugu		
2023	Pagalpan: Next Level	Harman Mann	Hindi		

=== Television ===
Year	Title	Role	Notes	Ref.
2023	Super Dhamaal	Host		
2025	Hai Junoon!	Kritika	Cameo appearance	

== Awards and nominations ==
Year	Award	Category	Film	Result	Ref.
2010	Stardust Awards	Exciting New Face	Rocket Singh: Salesman of the Year	Nominated	
2013	Stardust Awards	Best Supporting Actress	Housefull 2	Won	

== See also ==
- List of Indian film actresses
