= Vijaydan Detha =

Rajasthani folklorist and writer (1926 – 2013)

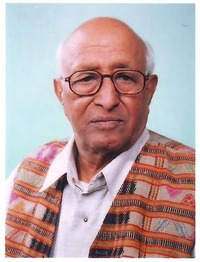
- Vijaydan Detha
- Born: 1 September 1926; Borunda, Jodhpur State, British India (now in Rajasthan, India)
- Died: 10 November 2013 (aged 87); Jodhpur, Rajasthan, India
- Occupation: Writer
- Spouse: Sayar Kanwar
- Children: 5
- Writing career
- Pen name: Bijji
- Language: Rajasthani
- Genres: Satire, folklore
- Subjects: Socialism, Antifeudalism, feminism
- Notable awards: Padma Shri; Sahitya Akademi Fellowship; Sahitya Akademi Award; Rajasthan Ratna

Vijaydan Detha (1 September 1926 – 10 November 2013), also known as Bijji, was an Indian writer of Rajasthani literature. He was a recipient of several awards including the Padma Shri and the Sahitya Akademi Award.

Detha has more than 800 short stories to his credit, which have been translated into English and other languages. With Komal Kothari, he founded Rupayan Sansthan, an institute that documents Rajasthani folklore, art, and music. His literary works include Bataan ri Phulwari (Garden of Tales), a 14-volume collection of stories that draws on folklore in the spoken dialects of Rajasthan. Many of his stories and novels have been adapted for the stage and the screen: adaptations include Mani Kaul's Duvidha (1973), Habib Tanvir and Shyam Benegal's Charandas Chor (1975), Prakash Jha's Parinati (1986), Amol Palekar's Paheli (2005), Pushpendra Singh's The Honour Keeper (2014), Dedipya Joshii's Kaanchli Life in a Slough (2020), and Pushpendra Singh's Laila aur Satt Geet (2020).

== Biography ==
Detha said, "My land Rajasthan is full of stories, whatever I've written is just a drop of the ocean". Detha, was inspired by Shah Govradhan Lal Kabra to write in Rajasthani "till date I have not written in any other language", he said regarding his love for the language. He portrayed the sufferings of the poor in his writings and was also tipped for the Nobel Prize for Literature in 2011 which ultimately went to Tomas Tranströmer.

== Works ==
=== Rajasthani ===
- Batan Ri Phulwari, vol. 1–14, 1960–1975, folklores Published by Rajasthani Granthagar, Jodhpur
- Prerana co-edited with Komal Kothari, 1953
- Soratha, 1956–1958
- Parampara , edited three special issues – Folk songs, Gora Hatja, Jethava Ra
- Rajasthani Lokgeet, folk songs of Rajasthan, six volumes, 1958
- Tido Rao, first pocket book in Rajasthani, 1965
- Uljhan,1984, novel
- Alekhun Hitler, 1984, short stories
- Roonkh, 1987
- Kaboo Rani, 1989, children's stories

=== Hindi ===
Due to respect for his mother tongue Rajasthani, Bijji has never written in any other language, most of his works are translated into Hindi by one of his sons Kailash Kabeer.

- Baton Ki Bagiya vol. 1–14, 2019, (Hindi translation of Batan Ri Phulwari) Published by Rajasthani Granthagar, Jodhpur
- Usha, 1946, poetry
- Bapu ke teen hatyare, 1948, critics
- Column in Jwala Weekly, 1949–1952
- Sahitya aur samaj, 1960, essays
- Anokha Ped, illustrated children's stories, 1968
- Phoolwari, Hindi translation by Kailash Kabir, 1992
- Chaudharain Ki Chaturai, short stories, 1996
- Antaral, 1997, short stories
- Sapan Priya, 1997, short stories
- Mero Darad Na Jane Koy, 1997, essays
- Atirikta, 1997, critics
- Mahamilan, novel, 1998
- Priya Mrinal, short stories, 1998

Detha also been credited for editing following works

- Complete work of Ganeshi Lal Vyas for Sahitya Akademi
- Rajasthani-Hindi Kahawat Kosh

== Adaptations ==
Detha's stories have been widely adapted for stage and screen, cementing his influence on Indian cinema and theater. Notable adaptations include:

- Duvidha (1973), directed by Mani Kaul, a minimalist film shot in Borunda, praised for its artistic depth.
- Charandas Chor (1975), a play by Habib Tanvir and a film by Shyam Benegal, celebrated for its folk-theater aesthetic.
- Parinati (1986), directed by Prakash Jha, based on a Detha story exploring greed and fate.
- Paheli (2005), directed by Amol Palekar, starring Shah Rukh Khan and Rani Mukerji, a mainstream adaptation of Duvidha.
- Lajwanti (2014) and Laila aur Satt Geet (2020), both directed by Pushpendra Singh, based on Detha's stories "Lajwanti" and "Kenchuli", respectively.
- Kaanchli Life in a Slough (2020), directed by Dedipya Joshii, another adaptation of "Kenchuli".

== Awards and honours ==
- Sahitya Akademi Award for Rajasthani in 1974
- Bhartiya Bhasa Parishad Award in 1992
- Marudhara Puraskar in 1995
- Bihari Puraskar in 2002
- Sahitya Chudamani Award in 2006
- Padma Shri in 2007
- Rao Siha 2011 by Mehrangarh Museum Trust
- Nobel Prize in Literature Nomination (2011): Detha was tipped as a contender, though the award went to Tomas Tranströmer.
- Kavi Kag Award, 2011
- Rajasthan Ratna in 2012

Detha's work was lauded by contemporaries like Hansda Sowvendra Shekhar, who described his stories as a “whirlpool” of vivid imagination, and Arunava Sinha, who praised their challenge to assumptions about modernity and morality.
