= Rocket Singh: Salesman of the Year =

2009 Indian film directed by Shimit Amin

- Theatrical release poster
- Directed by: Shimit Amin
- Written by: Jaideep Sahni
- Produced by: Aditya Chopra
- Starring: Ranbir Kapoor; Gauahar Khan; Shazahn Padamsee; Prem Chopra; Manish Chaudhari; D. Santosh
- Cinematography: Vikash Nowlakha
- Edited by: Arindam S. Ghatak
- Music by: Salim–Sulaiman
- Production company: Yash Raj Films
- Distributed by: Yash Raj Films
- Release dates: 10 December 2009 (Dubai); 11 December 2009 (India)
- Running time: 156 minutes
- Country: India
- Language: Hindi
- Budget: ₹16 crore
- Box office: ₹23.65 crore

Rocket Singh: Salesman of the Year is a 2009 Indian Hindi-language satire comedy-drama film directed by Shimit Amin, written by Jaideep Sahni, and produced by Aditya Chopra under the Yash Raj Films banner. It stars Ranbir Kapoor in the title role, with D. Santosh, Gauahar Khan, Naveen Kaushik, Prem Chopra, Manish Chaudhari, and debutante Shazahn Padamsee in supporting roles. The narrative follows Harpreet, an honest and idealistic commerce graduate, who enters the competitive world of sales and forms his own parallel company after facing disillusionment at his workplace.

Rocket Singh: Salesman of the Year was released theatrically on 11 December 2009, and received mixed-to-positive reviews from critics who praised the film's concept, writing, and Kapoor's performance. Although it was a commercial failure, grossing ₹23.65 crore worldwide, it has gained cult following over the years.

At the 55th Filmfare Awards, the film received three nominations, including Best Story and Best Dialogue (both for Sahni), and won Best Actor (Critics) for Kapoor. In conjunction with the release, ASTPL launched a mobile video game adaptation based on the film.

== Plot ==
Harpreet Singh Bedi, a recent B.Com graduate with modest academic credentials, begins working as a salesman at AYS, a corporate computer sales and services firm led by managing director Sunil Puri. Guided initially by sales head Nitin Rathore, Harpreet struggles to reconcile his idealism with the company's corrupt practices. When he reports a client’s request for a bribe, his actions alienate him from colleagues and nearly cost him his job.

Determined to follow his values, Harpreet secretly forms a parallel company—Rocket Sales Corporation—with support from sympathetic coworkers: technician Girish “Giri” Reddy, receptionist Koena Shaikh, and tea boy Chotelal Mishra. They operate covertly from within AYS, prioritizing customer service over profit. Nitin eventually joins the venture, softening his stance on ethical sales practices.

Rocket Sales gradually draws business away from AYS, frustrating Puri, who attempts to buy the rival company. Unaware of Harpreet's involvement, he is stunned when Harpreet rejects the offer and later discovers the company has been operating from within AYS. Harpreet and his team are fired, and Rocket Sales is absorbed by AYS for a token amount.

However, AYS fails to uphold Rocket Sales' values, leading to its decline. In a gesture of reluctant respect, Puri returns the company to Harpreet, who restarts the business independently. The film ends with Rocket Sales thriving as a customer-first company, affirming Harpreet’s belief in ethical business practices.

== Cast ==
- Ranbir Kapoor as Harpreet Singh Bedi
- Gauahar Khan as Koena Sheikh
- Shazahn Padamsee as Sherena Khanna
- D. Santosh as Girish "Giri" Reddy
- Manish Chaudhari as Sunil Puri
- Naveen Kaushik as Nitin Rathore
- Neeraj Sood as Lalwani
- Mukesh S. Bhatt as Chhotelal Mishra
- Mokshad Dodwani as Taxi
- Bikramjeet Kanwarpal as Inamdar
- Rajesh Jais as S. P. Chaudhary
- Amol Parashar as Sai Ram
- Debi Dutta as Aparna "Appy" Singh
- Prem Chopra as P. S. Bedi, Harpreet's grandfather
- Kayaan Contractor as Ayesha, Sherena's colleague
- Nidhi Oza as Vibha Ahuja
- Gireesh Sahedev as Wajahat
- Firdaus Mevawala as M. P. Sharma
- Akshat Kapil in a special appearance as Rocket Sales Corporation interviewee

== Reception ==
Rocket Singh: Salesman of the Year received generally positive reviews from critics, with particular praise for its grounded narrative and Ranbir Kapoor’s performance.

Rachel Saltz of The New York Times described it as "a smart, focused Bollywood movie," commending Kapoor for delivering "a skillfully understated performance." Anupama Chopra of NDTV rated the film 3 out of 5, while Nikhat Kazmi of The Times of India also gave it 3 stars.

The Economic Times awarded the film 4 out of 5, calling it "one of the most rocking films of the year." Namrata Joshi of Outlook gave it 3 stars, noting that the film "marks a continuum and a departure from the middle-class cinema of Hrishikesh Mukherjee, Basu Chatterjee, and Sai Paranjpye." Rajeev Masand of CNN-IBN rated it 3.5 out of 5, highlighting its refreshing take on ethical entrepreneurship.

The film also got featured in Avijit Ghosh's book "40 Retakes: Bollywood Classics You May Have Missed".

== Soundtrack ==
Rocket Singh: Salesman of the Year

Soundtrack album by Salim–Sulaiman
- Released: 13 November 2009
- Recorded: 2007
- Studios: YRF Studios, Mumbai
- Genre: Feature film soundtrack
- Length: 30:12
- Language: Hindi
- Label: YRF Music
- Producer: Yash Raj Films

Salim–Sulaiman chronology
| Kurbaan (2009) | Rocket Singh: Salesman of the Year (2009) | Pyaar Impossible! (2010) |

The soundtrack is composed by Salim–Sulaiman, with lyrics written by Jaideep Sahni.

All tracks are written by Jaideep Sahni.

| No. | Title | Singer(s) | Length |
|---|---|---|---|
| 1. | "Pankho Ko Hawa Zara" | Salim Merchant | 3:54 |
| 2. | "Pocket Mein Rocket Hai" | Benny Dayal, Neeraj Shridhar | 4:44 |
| 3. | "Gadbadi Hai Hadbadi Hai" | Vishal Dadlani | 4:15 |
| Total length: | | | 30:12 |

== Accolades ==
| Award | Date of the ceremony | Category | Recipients | Result | Ref. |
|---|---|---|---|---|---|
| Screen Awards | 10 January 2010 | Best Actor | Ranbir Kapoor | Nominated | |
| Screen Awards | 10 January 2010 | Best Supporting Actress | Gauahar Khan | Nominated | |
| Screen Awards | 10 January 2010 | Best Female Debut | Gauahar Khan | Nominated | |
| Screen Awards | 10 January 2010 | Best Comedian | D. Santosh | Nominated | |
| Screen Awards | 10 January 2010 | Best Villain | Manish Choudhary | Nominated | |
| Screen Awards | 10 January 2010 | Best Male Debut | Naveen Kaushik | Nominated | |
| Stardust Awards | 17 January 2010 | Breakthrough Performance – Female | Gauahar Khan | Nominated | |
| Stardust Awards | 17 January 2010 | Exciting New Face | Shazahn Padamsee | Nominated | |
| Filmfare Awards | 27 February 2010 | Best Actor (Critics) | Ranbir Kapoor (also for Wake Up Sid and Ajab Prem Ki Ghazab Kahani) | Won | |
| Filmfare Awards | 27 February 2010 | Best Story | Jaideep Sahni | Nominated | |
| Filmfare Awards | 27 February 2010 | Best Dialogue | Jaideep Sahni | Nominated | |
