= Nandu Bhende =

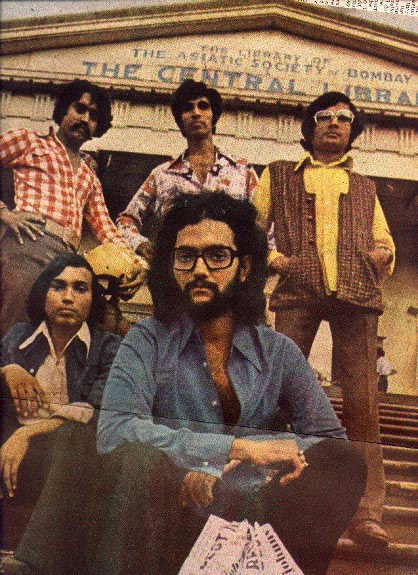
- Bhende (front) with Savage Encounter, 1975

Background information
- Also known as: Nandoo Bhende
- Born: Sadanand Atmaram Bhende; 27 November 1952
- Died: 11 April 2014 (aged 62) Mumbai
- Genres: Rock, pop, blues rock, soul
- Occupations: singer, musician, songwriter, actor
- Years active: 1970–2014
- Labels: His Master's Voice, TIPS
- Formerly of: Velvette Fogg, Brief Encounter, Savage Encounter, Atomic Forest Nandu Bhende Band

Nandu Bhende (27 November 1952 – 11 April 2014) was an Indian singer and actor.

== Life ==
Sadanand (Nandu) Bhende was the son of the Marathi actor-director Atmaram Bhende and Dr Asha Bhende (Born Lily Ezekiel Talkar of The Jewish Indian Bene Israel community). He was a theater artist, singer, music composer, music producer.

Bhende sang with 1970s bands such as Velvette Fogg, Brief Encounter and then Savage Encounter. He later went on to perform the roles of Judas in Alyque Padamsee's production of Jesus Christ Superstar and the role of Jesus in the Bangalore version of the same opera; this lead onto further roles in Tommy, Fantastiks and Jaya. He was also a playback singer in Bollywood films, his most famous work being in the 1982 musical "Disco Dancer", for which he received a Gold Disc. His maternal uncle was the noted Indian Jewish poet Nissim Ezekiel (Talkar).

He died on 11 April 2014 at Mumbai.
