= Duvidha =

1973 Indian film by Mani Kaul

- Directed by: Mani Kaul
- Written by: Vijayadan Detha
- Screenplay by: Mani Kaul
- Based on: Duvidha by Vijaydan Detha
- Produced by: Film Finance Corporation (NFDC); National Music Dance Centre
- Starring: Ravi Menon; Raisa Padamsee
- Cinematography: Navroze Contractor
- Edited by: Ravi Patnaik
- Release date: 1973
- Running time: 84 minutes
- Country: India
- Language: Hindi

Duvidha (transl. Dilemma) is a 1973 ghost movie directed by Mani Kaul, based on a Rajasthani story of the same name by Vijaydan Detha. The film stars Ravi Menon and Raisa Padamsee. The film was critically acclaimed and won the director the National Film Award for Best Direction and Critics Award for Best film at the 1974 Filmfare Awards. This film was remade in 2005 as Paheli, starring Shahrukh Khan and Rani Mukherjee.

== Plot ==
The film is set in rural Rajasthan. It is based on a story by Vijayadan Detha, which relates a popular folktale from Rajasthan about a merchant's son. A young bride is left alone when her merchant husband Krishanlal departs on a long business trip soon after their wedding. In his absence, a ghost, enchanted by her beauty, assumes the form of the absent husband and begins living with her. The bride, caught between longing and societal expectation, accepts the ghost as her companion, and their silent, surreal coexistence unfolds with dreamlike detachment. As the lines between the real and the supernatural blur, the film poses a haunting moral and emotional dilemma (“duvidha” meaning “dilemma”) about love, agency, and the constraints of tradition.

== Cast ==
- Raisa Padamsee as Lachhi
- Ravi Menon as Krishnalal, Merchant's Son
- Hardan
- Shambhudan
- Manohar Lalas
- Kana Ram
- Bhola Ram

== Production ==
The film was extensively shot in Borunda village, in Tehsil Bilara, Jodhpur district, the village of the author Vijay Dan Detha' Bijji.

== Music ==
The music of film was given by folk musicians of Rajasthan, Ramzan Hammu, Latif and Saki Khan.

== Remake ==
The Amol Palekar movie, Paheli, released in 2005, is also based on the same story.
