= Naveen Kaushik =

Indian actor and theatre artist

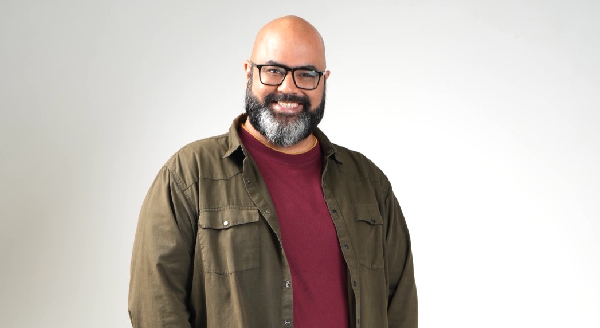
- Born: New Delhi, India
- Education: Delhi University
- Occupations: Actor; theatre artist
- Years active: 1999–present
- Organization: Mischief In Action
- Website: naveenkaushik.com

Naveen Kaushik is an Indian actor and theatre artist who works in Hindi films and television. He is best known for his roles in the comedy-drama Rocket Singh: Salesman of the Year (2009) and the spy action thriller Dhurandhar (2025). He began his career in Delhi theatre in the late 1990s and later transitioned to Mumbai-based film acting. He is also associated with improvisational theatre as the founder of the improv group Mischief In Action.

== Early life and theatre career ==
Naveen Kaushik was born and raised in New Delhi, India. He began acting while studying at Delhi University, which led him to join the acclaimed theatre group Act One in 2002, where he trained under N. K. Sharma. During his time with Act One, he performed in several theatre productions and worked extensively in street plays across India.

Kaushik is the founder of Mischief in Action, an improv acting group established in 2017, where he performs and conducts workshops aimed at developing improvisiational skills among actors.

== Career ==
Kaushik made his film debut with a supporting role in Dev. D. Upon relocating to Mumbai in 2009, he starred in the comedy-drama Rocket Singh: Salesman of the Year, his first major film role, alongside Ranbir Kapoor. He went onto appear in YRF's television series Seven and the Amazon Prime web series Inside Edge.

In 2025, he played the role of Donga in the spy-thriller Dhurandhar, a role that marked a departure from his earlier "boss" portrayals.

== Filmography ==
=== Film ===
Year	Title	Role	Notes
2009	Rocket Singh: Salesman of the Year	Nitin Rathore	
2012	Kismat Love Paisa Dilli	Shishodiya	
2012	Greater Elephant	Lord Shiva	
2013	Yeh Jawaani Hai Deewani	Sumer Kashyap	
2017	Bank Chor	Ashutosh Sharma	
2017	Guest iin London	Kaalia	
2018	Missing	Shankar	
2019	Bully	Raman's father	Short film
2022	Tadka	Danny	
2024	Bad Newz	Sahil Singh	
2025	Dhurandhar	Donga	
2026	Do Deewane Seher Mein	Shekhar	

=== Television ===
Year	Title	Role	Notes
2010	Seven	Asht	
2016–2017	Girl in the City	Rohan	
2017	Office vs Office	Manish	
2017–2019	Inside Edge	Joint Commissioner Rathore	
2019	Mr. Das	Amit Shukla	
2024	The Pickle Factory	Chandu	
