= Chhel Vayeda =

Indian art director and production designer

- Born: 1935; Dwarka, Baroda State
- Died: 12 November 2014 (aged 78–79); Mumbai, India
- Occupation(s): Art director, production designer
- Spouse: Kusum (m. 1964)
- Children: Sanjay Chhel, Alpana Buch
- Parents: Anandji (father); Jayakunvar (mother)

Chhel Anandji Vayeda (1935 – 12 November 2014) was a Gujarati art director and production designer from India.

== Early life ==
Chhel was born in 1935 in Dwarka (now in Gujarat) to Anandji and Jayakunvar. He was the youngest of seven siblings. His family moved to Bhuj when he was ten years old. He completed matriculation and joined School of Arts, Bhuj affiliated with University of Bombay. He started his job as assistant draftsman in state bus transport at GSRTC. His elder brother who was practicing law in Mumbai introduced him to Dr. D. G. Vyas, who was an art critic and director of Sir J. J. School of Arts. He resigned from GSRTC and moved to Mumbai to study in Sir J. J. School of Arts in 1960.

== Career ==
Gujarati stage director actor Honey Chhaya brought him in the field of art direction and production design in 1963 at Rangbhoomi Natya Academy. His first Gujarati play as an independent set designer, Parinita, produced by Rangbhoomi won him the first prize in state level play competition.

He joined Paresh Daru in 1966, and the duo was called Chhel-Paresh thereafter. Together, they designed sets of more than 700 plays in five languages including Gujarati, Marathi, Hindi, English, Sanskrit, and Oriya. They also designed for 55 films and multiple TV serials in varying languages. These films include Train to Pakistan (1998), Ankahee (1985), Tere Shahar Mein, Khubsoorat and Lorie (1984). He was an art director of some Gujarati films, including Kanku (1969), Upar Gagan Vishal, Dada Ho Dikri, Lakho Phulani (1976).

He died on 12 November 2014 at Mumbai.

== Personal life ==
He married Kusum in 1964. His son, Sanjay Chhel, is also a writer and director. His daughter Alpana Buch is a TV actress who is married to actor-director Mehul Buch.
