= Kyaa Dil Ne Kahaa =

- Poster
- Directed by: Sanjay Chhel
- Written by: Sanjay Chhel
- Story by: Trivikram Srinivas
- Based on: Swayamvaram (Telugu) by K. Vijaya Bhaskar
- Produced by: G. Adiseshagiri Rao; Sanjay Chhel
- Starring: Tusshar Kapoor; Esha Deol; Rajesh Khanna
- Cinematography: Madhu Ambat
- Edited by: Ashfaq Makrani; Sarwar Khan
- Music by: Himesh Reshammiya
- Production company: Padmalaya Studios
- Release date: 28 June 2002
- Country: India
- Language: Hindi

Kyaa Dil Ne Kahaa (English: What Did the Heart Say?) is a 2002 Indian Hindi-language romantic comedy-drama film directed by Sanjay Chhel. The film stars Tusshar Kapoor, Esha Deol, and Rajesh Khanna. The film is a remake of the Telugu film Swayamvaram.

== Synopsis ==
New Zealand-settled Esha is attracted to fellow-student Rahul who is also attracted to her. Esha returns home to India and tells her parents about her love for Rahul. The family is pleased and proceeds to finalize the marriage. They accompany Esha to Rahul's house. Rahul's parents approve of Esha. But when they ask Rahul, to everyone's shock, he refuses to marry Esha under any circumstances.

== Cast ==
- Tusshar Kapoor as Rahul Vashisht
  - Osho Chhel as young Rahul
- Esha Deol as Esha Kapoor
- Rajesh Khanna as Siddharth Vashisht
- Smita Jaykar as Maya Vashisht
- Raj Babbar as Esha's father
- Neena Kulkarni as Esha's mother
- Shammi as Esha's grandmother
- Ashok Saraf as Mr. Rajeev Patel
- Razak Khan as Chander
- Dilip Joshi as Rahul's friend
- Atul Parchure as Rahul's friend
- Dilip Thadeshwar as Rahul's friend

== Soundtrack ==
The music of the film is composed by Himesh Reshammiya, with lyrics written by Sanjay Chhel. According to the Indian trade website Box Office India, with around 1 million units sold, this film's soundtrack album was the year's thirteenth highest-selling. The song "Nikamma Kya Is Dil Ne" was later re-composed for the film Nikamma by Javed-Mohsin.

Kyaa Dil Ne Kaha

Soundtrack album by Himesh Reshammiya
- Released: 12 April 2002 (India)
- Genre: Feature film soundtrack
- Label: Sony Music India Pvt. Ltd.

Himesh Reshammiya chronology
Aamdani Atthanni Kharcha Rupaiya (2002)	Kyaa Dil Ne Kaha (2002)	Humraaz (2002)

#	Title	Singer(s)
1	"Kya Dil Ne Kaha"	Udit Narayan, Alka Yagnik
2	"Nikamma Kiya Is Dil Ne" (I)	Shaan, Sanjivani Bhelande
3	"Taaza Taaza"	Shaan, Alka Yagnik
4	"Sajana Tere Pyar Mein"	Udit Narayan, Alka Yagnik
5	"Piya Pyar Ye Kyon Kiya"	Kavita Krishnamurthy, Udit Narayan
6	"Zindagi Ye Dillagi"	Shaan
7	"Nikamma Kiya Is Dil Ne"	Shaan, Sanjivani Bhelande, Jaspinder Narula
