= Hun Hunshi Hunshilal =

- Directed by: Sanjiv Shah
- Written by: Paresh Naik
- Screenplay by: Paresh Naik
- Story by: Paresh Naik
- Produced by: Sanjiv Shah
- Starring: Dilip Joshi; Renuka Shahane; Manoj Joshi; Mohan Gokhale; Arvind Vaidya
- Cinematography: Navroze Contractor
- Music by: Rajat Dholakia
- Production company: Karnar Productions
- Release date: 1992
- Running time: 120 minutes
- Country: India
- Language: Gujarati

Hun Hunshi Hunshilal (transl. I am Hunshi Hunshilal; English Title: Love in the Time of Malaria) is a 1992 Indian Gujarati-language musical political satire film directed by Sanjiv Shah.

== Plot ==
In the kingdom of Khojpuri, King Bhadrabhoop, is annoyed by mosquitoes (representative of middle and lower class).

In a small village, Doongri, Hunshi is born to a doctor. After growing up, he adopts more respectable moniker, Hunshilal. Hunshilal moves to Khojpuri to work at Queen's Lab, a laboratory which aims to eradicate mosquitoes problem once and for all. At the lab, Hunshilal falls in love with the fellow scientist, Parveen.

== Cast ==
- Dilip Joshi as Hunshilal
- Renuka Shahane as Parveen
- Manoj Joshi
- Mohan Gokhale as King Bhadrabhoop II of Khojpuri
- Arvind Vaidya as King's assistant
- Shubhangi Gokhale as the Queen
- Hasmukh Bhavsar as the King's Assistant
- Nimesh Desai - Astrologer
- Jinshnu Bhatt

== Soundtrack ==
The film had 45 songs, which are used well to take the story forward. The composer Rajat Dholakia composed them in two days.. Raghubir Yadav has sung one song 'Hawa Hai' which is one of the finest songs of the film.
