= Atomic Forest =

Indian rock band

- Origin: Bombay, India
- Genres: Psychedelic rock, heavy Rock
- Years active: 1971–1981
- Labels: Music India, Now-Again Records
- Past members: Neel Chattopadhyaya; Madhukar Dhas; Keith Kanga; Valentine Lobo; Jerry DeMoss; Abraham Mammen; Glen Gilbanks; Dheena Chandra Dhas; Jimi; Ritchie; Cedric; Bosco Monsorate; Rajneesh Duggal; Dhanraj Skau; Zubin Balaporia; Bunty Duggal; Nandu Bhende

Atomic Forest was a popular Indian psychedelic and hard rock band from Bombay, active in the 1970s, formed by Neel Chattopadhyaya, with Keith Kanga, Valentine Lobo and Madhukar C. Dhas. The band's lineup changed over the years, as members left and others took their place. It was thought that they had recorded a single album, Obsession '77, However, since 2011, two new LPs have been reissued by Now-Again Records, Obsession, and Disco Roar (a rediscovered first-album).

== Background ==
Atomic Forest only recorded one album, which was not released until after the band had dissolved, in 1981. Obsession 77 was re-released in January 2011 by Now-Again Records, a Los Angeles-based label. It caught the attention of collectors as it was the only psychedelic rock album that was ever produced in India. The group also featured in Abhimanyu Kukreja's rockumentary, Evolution of Indian Rock. The band is also famously known for performing with English rock band Led Zeppelin.

== Members ==
=== Original Atomic Forest line-up ===
- Neel Chattopadhyaya: guitars
- Madhukar C. Dhas: vocals
- Keith Kanga: bass
- Valentine Lobo: drums

=== First phase of subsequent members ===
- Glen Gilbanks: vocals
- Keith Kanga: bass
- Jerry DeMoss: drums
- Abraham Mammen: guitars

=== Second phase of subsequent members (around 1976) ===
- Dheena Chandra Dhas: vocals
- Abraham Mammen: guitars
- Jerry DeMoss: drums
- Keith Kanga: bass

=== Third phase of subsequent members (until around 1979–1980) ===
- Dheena Chandra Dhas: vocals
- Jimi: guitars
- Ritchie: bass
- Cedric: drums

This lineup would later change their name around 1980, to become the band "Hope" and they became backing band for the rock opera "Tommy", in which Dheena would also act.

=== Other members ===
- Bosco Monsorate: guitars
- Rajneesh Duggal: Drums.
- Dhanraj Skau: Guitars
- Zubin Balaporia: Keyboards
- Bunty Duggal: Rhythm Guitar & Vocals
- Nandu Bhende: vocals

=== Notes ===
- Keith Kanga: Stopped playing after finger paralysis, continued exclusively as the band's manager.

Madhukar Dhas joined the band in 1971. Also that year, Jazz musician Joe Alvarez played with the band at Blow-up in the Taj Mahal Palace Hotel.

Nandu Bhende, a former member of the group, died of a heart attack on 18 May 2014.

== Discography ==
Albums
Title	Label	Year	Notes #
Obsession '77	Music India 2392 580	1981	LP; Produced by Sharon Prabhakar
Obsession	Now-Again Records NA 5087	2011	2LP; Compilation
Disco Roar	Now-Again Records NA 5188LP	2019	LP
