= The Savages (Indian band) =

Indian band (active 1965–1976)

The Savages were an Indian band based in Mumbai who were one of the first Indian bands to play rock and roll music. Active from 1965 to 1976, The Savages became one of Mumbai's most popular bands. They are considered to have release the first Indian rock LP.

The Savages were one of a number of bands to spring up in India following the worldwide popularity of rock and roll, generally referred to as beat music in India. The Savages, like most Indian beat music groups, played mostly covers of Western rock and roll songs. They were formed in 1965 by Bashir Sheikh, who was inspired to become a drummer after seeing the film The Gene Krupa Story (1959), featuring Sal Mineo as jazz drummer Gene Krupa. He recruited guitarist Lenny Cason to form The Savages. They took their name from the 1961 instrumental rock song "The Savage" by The Shadows. Cason soon left the band, but the band added guitarist Hemant Rao, bassist Pio Manzi, and rhythm guitarist Clifford Lee.

The Savages won city-wide beat music competitions in 1967 and 1968. As a result, they were signed to the record label HMV. Their first single in 1967 featured two original songs: "The Girl Next Door" and "Pain," the latter written by Lee and featuring singer Asha Puthli. Leo and Manzi left and the band added keyboardist Prabhakar Mundkur, bass guitarist Ralph Pais, and singer Russell Pereira. They were signed by Polydor Records and released their first LP, The Savages Live, which was record in a studio with applause sounds added in later.

Hemant Rao departed the band and was replaced by Remo Fernandes, an architecture student who would go on to a long musical career after The Savages. They released an EP with Fernandes singing a cover of the Jose Feliciano song "Old Turkey Buzzard" and his own song, "Ode to the Messiah". Fernandes returned to school and the band added Barry and Joe Alvares. Their next album Black Scorpio (1973) has become a cult classic and a copy of it sold for $3000 on eBay in 2011.

In 1972, The Savages merged with Nandu Bhende's band Brief Encounter to form a short-lived band called Savage Encounter.
