= Navroze Contractor =

Indian cinematographer

- Born: 7 July 1944; Wai, Maharashtra
- Died: 18 June 2023 (aged 79); Bengaluru, India
- Education: FTII, Pune
- Occupations: Filmmaker, cinematographer, motorbike enthusiast
- Years active: Late ’60s to 2023
- Spouse: Deepa Dhanraj (wife)
- Relatives: Nazneen Contractor (niece)

Navroze Contractor (1944–2023), fondly known as ‘NC’, was an Indian filmmaker, cinematographer, and motorbike enthusiast. He was involved in India's parallel cinema movement and is best known for his work in Duvidha, Devi Ahilya Bai, Percy, Hun Hunshi Hunshilal, and Lalach. He shot more than 50 documentary films, many of them in collaboration with his wife and well-known filmmaker Deepa Dhanraj.

He was the only male member of Yugantar, India's first feminist collective founded in 1980 by Deepa, Abha Bhaiya, and Meera Rao.

His photos of jazz musicians are displayed at the Smithsonian Museum. Certain other photos are part of the collection at London's Tate Modern art gallery.

== Early life and career ==
The Family of Man, a traveling photography exhibition Navroze saw in 1957 in Ahmedabad, was his main influence in becoming a photographer.

Navroze studied painting and photography at the Faculty of Fine Arts, MS University, Vadodara, while simultaneously training in additional still photography under Bhupendra Karia. This was in the early to mid-’60s.

Navroze studied direction and cinematography at the Film and Television Institute of India, Pune, then worked in two feature films and a few documentaries before interning with Laszlo Kovacs in the US. He also gained experience in video production at the Sony Corporation in Japan.

In the late 1960s, Navroze briefly worked as a still photographer on some Ford Foundation projects in Punjab. During this time, he assisted Mani Kaul in scouting locations for his first film, Uski Roti.

In 1972, Kaul engaged Navroze to shoot Duvidha, the director’s third feature and first color film.Duvidha is known for its rich color schemes reminiscent of classical paintings.

Navroze has clicked more than 20,000 still photos over more than six decades, from the 1960s to 2021. These encompass a broad range of subjects (e.g., jazz musicians, ballet artists, wrestlers, laborers, refugees, protesters, ordinary people). The photo collections span several countries: Argentina, China, India, Iran, Mongolia, the Netherlands, and the UK.

Over 160 of these photos were featured in a traveling exhibition titled "Photography Strictly Prohibited," which toured many Indian cities such as Ahmedabad, Bangalore, Delhi, Gurugram, Hyderabad, and Pune during 2024-2025. The exhibition was curated by Anuj Ambalal (photographer), Himanshu Panchal (photographer/filmmaker), and Sanjiv Shah (filmmaker). All three were close friends and collaborators of Navroze.

Apart from Kaul, Deepa, and Sanjiv, Navroze has worked with the following filmmakers: Chetan Shah, Georges Luneau, Jayoo Patwardhan and Nachiket, Ketan Mehta, Luke Jennings, Martha Stewart, Pattabhi Rama Reddy, Pervez Merwanji, Pierre Hoffman, and Shankar Nag.

In 2021, he published his first book Dreams of the Dragon's Children, based on his experiences filming a documentary in China during the mid-1980s. The book is a mix of travelogue, cultural commentary, and film history, offering a vivid portrait of China at a time of rapid transformation.

On 18 June 2023, he died in a motorbike accident in Bengaluru.

== Personal ==
Navroze was married to Deepa, who he met in the 1980s. His family includes his wife and daughters, and they have lived in Bangalore for the past few decades.

== Filmography ==
Cinematographer - feature films

- Duvidha (1973)
- 22nd June 1987 (1979)
- Pahela Adhyay (1981)
- Lalach (1983)
- Percy (1989)
- Hun, Hunshi, Hunshilal (1992)
- Juthan Jariwala (1993)
- Devarakadu (1993)
- Limited Manuski (1995)
- Devi Ahilya Bai (2002)
- Framed (2007)

Cinematographer - documentaries

- La Ballade de Pabuji (1976)
- Ever Higher (1976)
- Bhavai (1977)
- Jasma Odhan (1977)
- Are You Looking?
- Way of the Malabar Warrier (1980)
- Maid Servant (1981)
- Tobacco Embers (1982)
- Tambaku Chaakila Oob Aali (1982)
- Alang (1982)
- Idi Katha Matramena (1983)
- Sudesha (1983)
- Manto-Bombay (1985)
- Bishnois (1985)
- Irulas (1986)
- What has Happened to this City (1986)
- Famine 87 (1987)
- The Fishing Boat (1987)
- India's Rajiv (1987)
- Last House in Bombay (1990)
- Girija (1990)
- Something Like a War (1991)
- All in the Family (1992)
- Thaar (1993)
- Abhiyan (1993)
- British Raj Through Indian Eyes (1993)
- Rama's Journey, Ayodhya to Sri Lanka (1994)
- The Legacy of Malthus (1994)
- Disability in Your Eyes (1995)
- The Making of Jaguar (1995)
- Enough of This Silence (1996)
- The Mountains (1996)
- Sewa (1997)
- Offside (1998)
- Clap Trap (2000)
- Hidimba (2000)
- The Family (2000)
- Nari Adalat (2001)
- Amrita Shergil (2001)
- Are You Listening?
- Love in the Time of AIDS (2006)
- The Open Frame (2011)
- Invoking Justice (2011)
- We Have Not Come Here to Die (2011)
- Out Loud (2015)
- The Advocate: K.G. Kannabiran (2016)
- Refugee Stories (2016)
- A Place to Live (2018)
- Untitled
- Jagori (2019)

Cinematographer/Director - documentaries

- Bharat Parikrama (2005)
- Jharu Katha/Broom Stories (2012)

Still photos

- More than 20,000
- Some of these are part of the collections at the Smithsonian Museum, London’s Tate Modern, and a traveling exhibition titled "Photography Strictly Prohibited"

Books and publications

- The Dreams of the Dragon's Children, Penguin Books, 2003
- Contributory articles in periodicals like CAR India/Bike India, ZigWheels, Overdrive, Wheels Unplugged, Fast Bikes, and Bangalore Mirror
