= Sanjay Chhel =

Indian film director, writer and lyricist (born 1967)

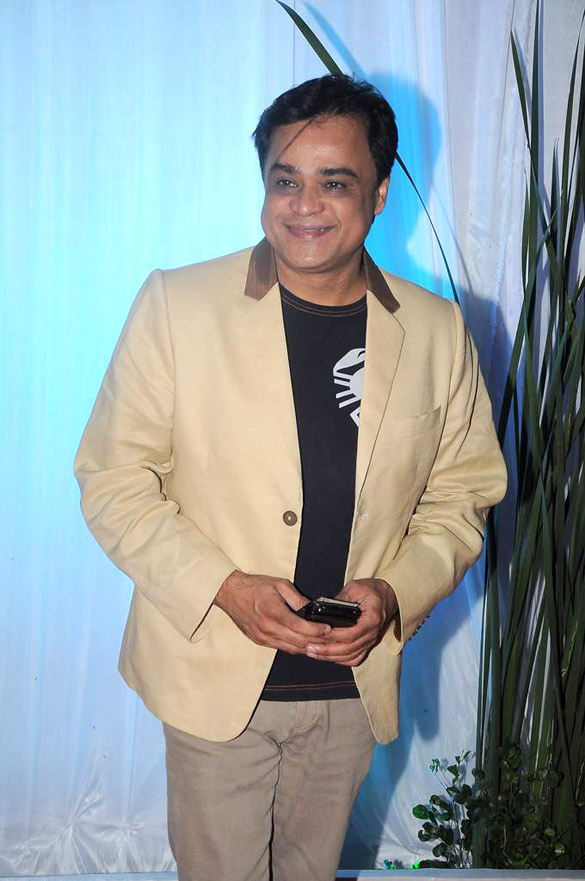
- Sanjay Chhel at Esha Deol's wedding reception in 2012
- Born: 14 October 1967 (age 58); Dwarka, Gujarat, India
- Occupations: Film director, lyricist, writer
- Years active: 1990s–present
- Spouse: Zankhna
- Children: Osho
- Parents: Chhel Vayeda (father); Kusum (mother)

Signature
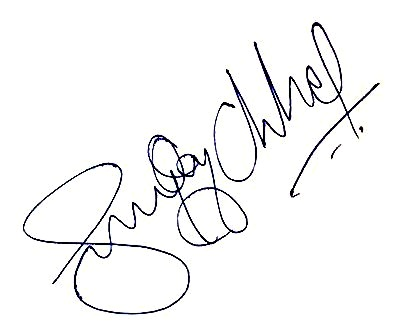

Sanjay Chhel is an Indian film director, writer and lyricist.

== Early life ==
Sanjay Chhel was born on 14 October 1967 at Dwarka in Gujarat, India. He spent his childhood in Mumbai. He is son of art director and production designer Chhel Vayeda.

== Career ==
As his father was a production designer who worked with several play producers, he was inspired to write his first one-act play, Ubhi Chavi Adi Chavi which was very successful. His one-act play Crossword Puzzle gave him recognition. His experimental play Prakaran 1956 was well recognized. He wrote more than 30 TV serials including Rangaberangi, Amasna Tara, Nukkad and Philips Top Ten. He directed and produced a TV series Hum Sab Baraati (2004) for Zee TV.

He has written or directed more than 25 films. He debuted in film industry by writing Pehla Nasha (1993). He debuted in direction with Khoobsurat (1999). He wrote story of Kachche Dhaage (1999), Phir Bhi Dil Hai Hindustani (2000), Maine Pyaar Kyun Kiya? (2005), Partner (2007), Kismat Konnection (2008). He wrote dialogues and lyrics of Dil Toh Baccha Hai Ji (2011). He directed Kyaa Dil Ne Kahaa (2002). He wrote and directed Maan Gaye Mughal-e-Azam (2008). His film Patel Ki Punjabi Shaadi produced by Bharat Patel released on 15 September 2017 was commercially unsuccessful.

He wrote several popular Hindi film songs including "E Shivani...", "Nikamma Kiya Iss Dilne", "Mahobbat Hai Mirchi..", "Do You Wanna Parter..".

He wrote short stories which were published in Navneet Samarpan, Janmabhoomi, Abhiyan, Parab, Sarvani magazines. He wrote column in Samkalin in 1989–90. He again started writing weekly column, Andaz-e-Bayan in Divya Bhaskar in 2009 which became popular. He writes weekly columns in Gujarati dailies, Mumbai Samachar, Gujarat Mitra, NavGujarat Samay, Kutch Mitra, Phulchhab. His first book Muththi Unchera Kanti Madia, about Gujarati actor-director Kanti Madia, was released in October 2017. He wrote 10 books of Andaz-e-Bayan series released in 2020 which is a compilation of his columns published in a newspaper. His short story collection Poster was published in 2021.

== Personal life ==
He is a vegetarian. He married his classmate Zankhna and they have a son, Osho.

== Filmography ==
=== Films ===
- Rangeela (1995) - dialogues
- Yes Boss (1997) - dialogue
- Daud (1997) - dialogue
- Kachche Dhaage (1999) - story
- Khoobsurat (1999) - Director, lyrics
- Phir Bhi Dil Hai Hindustani (2000) - story idea, dialogues
- Love You Hamesha (2001) - story
- Kyaa Dil Ne Kahaa (2002) - Director, lyrics
- Krishna Cottage (2004) - lyrics
- Jo Bole So Nihaal (2005) - story
- Partner (2007) - story
- Maan Gaye Mughal-e-Azam (2008) - Director
- Kismat Konnection (2008) - screenplay
- Good Luck! (2008) - screenplay
- Dil Toh Baccha Hai Ji (2011) - lyrics
- Patel Ki Punjabi Shaadi (2017) - Director
- Kill the Rapist?
- Indu Sarkar (2017) - dialogues
- Love You Loktantra (film) (2022) - dialogues
- Nikamma (2022) - lyrics

=== TV series ===
- Naya Nukkad (1993–94)
- Filmy Chakkar (1994–96)
- Mast Mast Hai Zindagi (1995)
- Main Anari Tu Khiladi (1995)
- Phillips Top 10 (1996–97)
- Dekh Tamasha Dekh (1996–97)
- Filmy Chakkar - Season 2 (1997)
- Alwaida Darling (2000)
- Humari Bahu Malini Ayyar (2003–04)
- Hum Sab Baraati (2004)
- Heroine (2010)
- Hitler Didi (2012)
- Taarak Mehta Ka Ooltah Chashmah (2014)
- Suri (Gujarati - 2016)
- Yeh Un Dino Ki Baat Hai (2017–18)
- Saat Phero Ki Hera Pherie (2018)

== See also ==
- List of Gujarati-language writers
