= Dil Toh Baccha Hai Ji =

2011 Indian film by Madhur Bhandarkar

- Theatrical release poster
- Directed by: Madhur Bhandarkar
- Screenplay by: Madhur Bhandarkar; Anil Pandey; Neeraj Udhwani
- Dialogues by: Sanjay Chhel
- Produced by: Madhur Bhandarkar; Kumar Mangat Pathak
- Starring: Ajay Devgn; Emraan Hashmi; Omi Vaidya
- Narrated by: Paresh Rawal
- Cinematography: Ravi Walia
- Edited by: Devendra Murdeshwar
- Music by: Songs: Pritam; Background Score: Sandeep Shirodkar
- Production companies: Bhandarkar Entertainment; Wide Frame Films
- Release date: 28 January 2011
- Running time: 143 minutes
- Country: India
- Language: Hindi
- Box office: ₹28.91 crore

Dil Toh Baccha Hai Ji (The heart is childlike) is a 2011 Indian Hindi-language romantic comedy film co-written and directed by Madhur Bhandarkar. The film stars Ajay Devgn, Emraan Hashmi and Omi Vaidya in the lead roles with Shazahn Padamsee, Shruti Haasan, Rituparna Sengupta, Tisca Chopra, and Shraddha Das in supporting roles. The film was released on 28 January 2011.

== Plot ==
Three men living different lifestyles in Mumbai are in search of the ‘perfect love life’. Naren Ahuja works as a bank manager and is seeking a divorce from his wife, Madhavi; Abhay Suri is a playboy and gym trainer, and Milind Kelkar, a poet by night, works for a matrimonial company by day and is searching for true love. Naren shifts back to his late parents' house. Abhay and Milind are thrown out of their rented apartments and end up as paying guests at Naren's home. Later, Naren develops a crush on June Pinto, a new intern at his bank. Milind begins to develop feelings for a radio jockey, Gungun Sarkar, who he meets at an open mic event recommended by his friend Jimmy. Abhay, who is friends with Jimmy's friend Bobby, accompanies Bobby to supermodel Mona Sequeira's funeral where he falls for Mona's rival Anushka Narang, a former Miss India who married multi-millionaire Harsh Narang and is interested in younger men due to her differences with an emotionally unavailable Harsh.

Naren and June begin to enjoy each other's company. Milind tries to impress Gungun, which annoys her, although she uses him for her own reasons. Abhay receives plenty of attention from Anushka, and the two begin an affair. The three love stories blossom until Nikki Narang, Anushka's stepdaughter, enters the picture. Abhay falls for Nikki and begins ignoring Anushka. He breaks up with Anushka and starts dating Nikki. June's grandmother invites Naren to dinner, and Gungun eventually falls in love with Milind. However, everything changes. Milind is upset after receiving a letter from Gungun stating that she is going to Chennai for a film project; Nikki dumps Abhay, admitting that she was only using him for sex and that he is not her type; and June's grandmother asks for Naren's opinion on June marrying Chris Pascal, her boyfriend. At the airport, the three men decide to go to Goa for a holiday and vow never to fall in love again. However, they soon meet three new women.

== Cast ==
- Ajay Devgn as Naren Ahuja
- Emraan Hashmi as Abhay Suri
- Omi Vaidya as Milind Kelkar
- Shazahn Padamsee as June Pinto
- Shruti Haasan as Nikki Narang
- Tisca Chopra as Anushka "Anu" Narang
- Shraddha Das as Gungun Sarkar
- Aditya Raj Kapoor as Harsh Narang
- Rituparna Sengupta as Madhavi Ahuja, Naren's ex-wife
- Mukesh Tiwari as Mr. Mukesh Tiwari (special appearance)
- Manoj Joshi as Waiter at Restaurant (special appearance)
- Shikha Talsania as Aisha, Naren's assistant
- Arun Kadam as the flower seller
- Sachin Parikh as Naren's colleague
- Gireesh Sahdev as Naren's colleague
- Daisy Irani as June's Nani
- Neha Pendse as Neha Desai
- Sanjay Chhel as Himesh
- Imran Khan as Bobby
- Howard Rosemeyer as Jimmy
- Dhruv Bhandari as Chris Pascal, June's boyfriend
- Sunny Singh as Akash (cameo appearance)
- Chetna Pande as Piya (cameo appearance)
- Priya Marathe as Swati Paranjape (cameo appearance)
- Bhau Kadam as Dipak Sisodia (cameo appearance)
- Shweta Salve as an item dancer (special appearance)

== Rating ==
The film received an A (Adults only) rating by the Central Board of Film Certification after Bhandarkar refused to cut several scenes he felt were integral to the film.

== Reception ==
The film received positive reviews from critics upon release. Gaurav Malani of The Times of India wrote "While Madhur Bhandarkar's first attempt at making a feel-good film has got an adult censor certificate, it certainly turns out to be a childish attempt at comedy. Kaveree Bamzai of India Today gave 3 out of 5 stars, writing "Dil Toh Bachcha Hai Jee seems most unlike a Bhandarkar film. Which is both good and bad".

== Soundtrack ==
Dil Toh Baccha Hai Ji

Soundtrack album by Pritam
- Released: 23 December 2010
- Genre: Film soundtrack
- Length: 39:26
- Label: T-Series
- Producer: Pritam

Pritam chronology
Golmaal 3 (2010)	Dil Toh Baccha Hai Ji (2010)	United Six (2011)

The soundtrack was composed by Pritam, with the lyrics written by Neelesh Misra, Kumaar, Sanjay Chhel, and Sayeed Quadri.

The film score is composed by Sandeep Shirodkar.

=== Track listing ===
No.	Title	Lyrics	Performer(s)	Length
1.	"Abhi Kuch Dino Se"	Neelesh Misra	Mohit Chauhan, Shahid Mallya	4:45
2.	"Tere Bin"	Kumaar	Sonu Nigam	5:17
3.	"Yeh Dil Hai Nakhrewala"	Neelesh Misra	Shefali Alvares	4:33
4.	"Jadugari"	Sanjay Chhel	Kunal Ganjawala	4:56
5.	"Beshuba"	Sayeed Quadri	Kunal Ganjawala, Antara Mitra, Nooran Sisters	4:30
6.	"Tere Bin (Reprise)"	Kumaar	Naresh Iyer	5:32
7.	"Yeh Dil Hai Nakhrewala (Film Version)"	Neelesh Misra	Antara Mitra	4:19
8.	"Tere Bin" (Remix)	Kumaar	Sonu Nigam	5:34
Total length:				39:26
