= Dheena Chandra Dhas =

- Born: Samuel Dhinakar Chandra Dhas; 1 August 1956 (age 70); Madras, India
- Other names: Dheena, Deena Chandra Das
- Occupations: Actor, singer, voice over artist, dubbing artist
- Years active: 1970s to present
- Relatives: Devasahayam Manohar Chandra Dhas (brother), Madhukar C. Dhas (brother), John Sudhakar Chandradhas (brother)
- Musical career
- Origin: Madras, India
- Genres: Rock; Indian Rock; Pop
- Occupations: Singer, sound engineer, voice over artist, dubbing artist
- Instruments: Vocals, guitar
- Formerly of: Atomic Forest; Magic; Desire; Commandoes; Hope; Rage; Culture Lynx; Storm; The 2nd Chapter; The Phantom Revival; Satin
- Website: dheenavoice.com

Dheena Chandra Dhas (born in Madras, India, on 1 August 1956) is an actor, singer, voice over artist and sound engineer. He is the younger brother of the 1970s musician Madhukar C. Dhas. He lives in Kodaikanal, Tamil Nadu, India.

== Music ==
Dhas has been a part of a number of Indian bands from the 1970s to the 1990s. Over the years, he has been the lead vocalist in multiple rock bands in India and abroad.

- Magic (Chennai)
- Desire (Chennai)
- Commandoes (Madras)
- Atomic Forest (Bombay)
- Hope (Bombay)
- Rage (Chennai)
- Culture Lynx (Chennai)
- Storm (Chennai)
- The 2nd Chapter (Chennai)
- The Phantom Revival (Bombay) and
- Satin (Dubai)

=== Playback Singing ===
He has performed playback singing for multiple films over the years, a few among them are Daud, Trinetrudu, Idu Saadhya. He sang "Zahreela Zahreela Pyar" for the film Daud, composed by A. R. Rahman, alongside Asha Bhonsle.

== Stage Acting ==
He has also performed for a number of musicals in Madras and elsewhere in India, singing and acting on stage in productions such as Jesus Christ Superstar as Judas, Cats, Tommy, Joseph and the Amazing Technicolor Dreamcoat, Starlight Express, and Witness.

== Acting ==
His film acting career began when he was offered the role of "Raju" in both the Hindi and Tamil versions of Kamal Haasan's Mumbai Xpress. He also plays the Lungiman in Peter Yesley's short film, Lungiman Takes a Ride.

On television, he has acted in some Tamil soap operas, Kolangal being one of them.
