= Akbar Padamsee =

Indian artist (1928–2020)

- Born: 12 April 1928; Bombay, Maharashtra, India
- Died: 6 January 2020 (aged 91); Coimbatore, Tamil Nadu, India
- Education: Sir J.J. School of Art
- Occupation: Painter
- Children: Raisa Padamsee
- Website: akbarpadamsee.net

Akbar Padamsee (12 April 1928 – 6 January 2020) was an Indian artist and painter, considered one of the pioneers in modern Indian painting along with S.H. Raza, F.N. Souza and M.F. Husain. Over the years he also worked with various mediums from oil painting, plastic emulsion, water colour, sculpture, printmaking, to computer graphics, and photography. In addition, he worked as a film maker, sculptor, photographer, engraver, and lithographer. Today his paintings are among the most valued by modern Indian artists. His painting Reclining Nude was sold for US$1,426,500 at Sotheby's in New York on 25 March 2011.

He was awarded the Lalit Kala Akademi Fellowship (Lalit Kala Ratna) by the Lalit Kala Akademi, India's National Academy of Arts, in 2004, the Kalidas Samman from the Madhya Pradesh Government in 1997 for Plastic Arts and the Padma Bhushan, India's third highest civilian honour in 2010.

== Early life and family ==
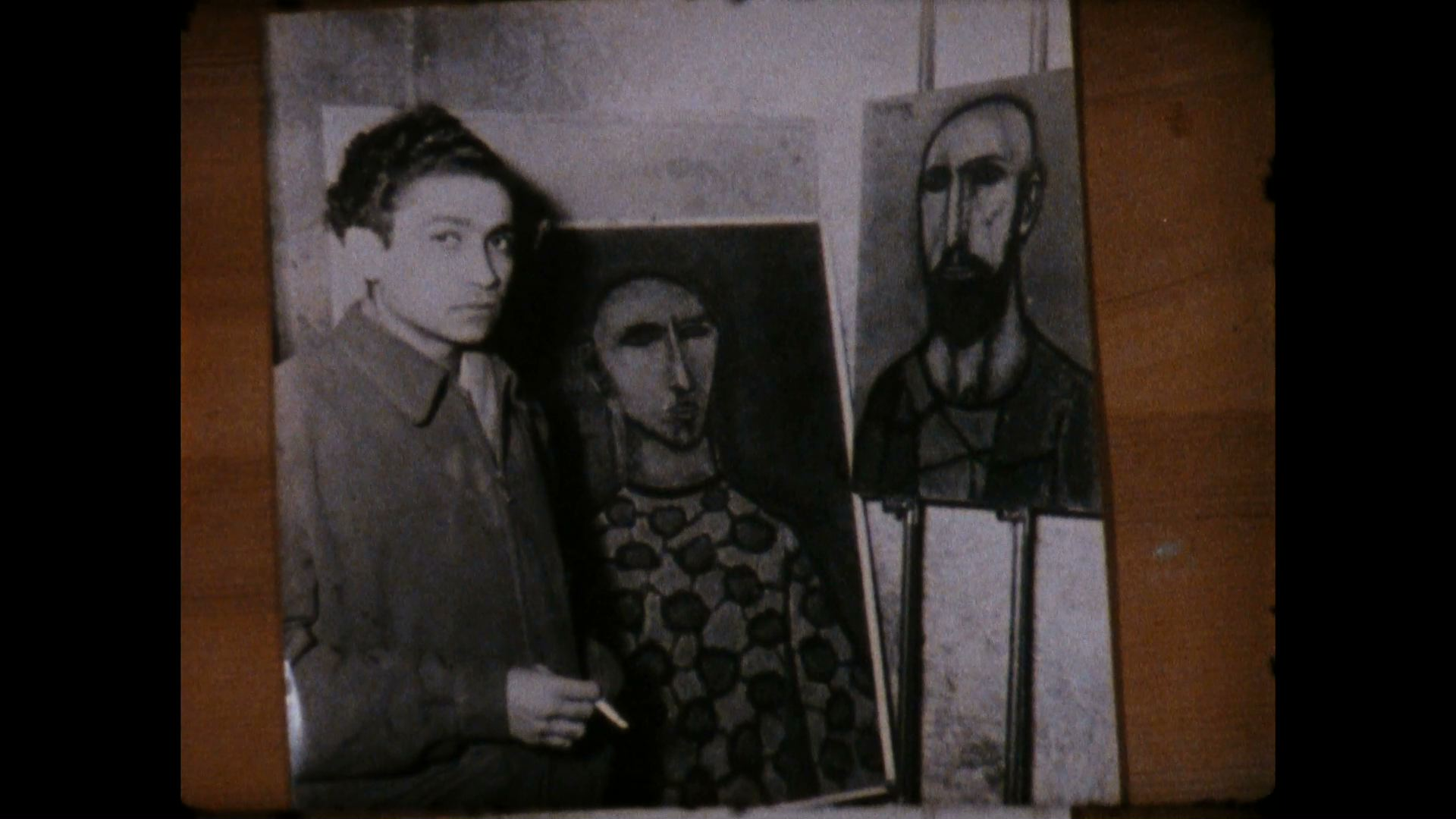
Akbar Padamsee in Paris 1950s

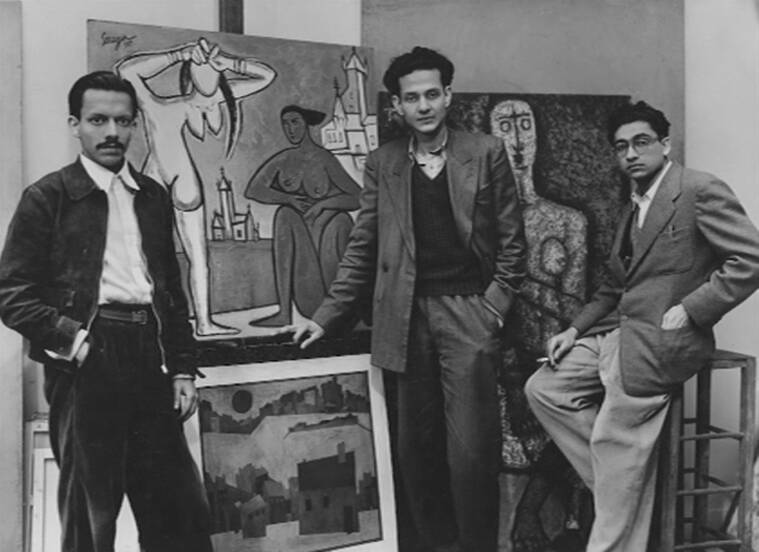
F. N. Souza with S. H. Raza and Akbar Padamsee in 1952

Padamsee was born into a traditional Khoja Muslim family hailing from the Kutch region of Gujarat. Their ancestors had belonged to the Cāraṇa caste of court poets and historians. The family had been settled in the nearby Kathiawar region for some generations; Padamsee's grandfather, who had been the sarpanch (headman) of Vāghnagar, a village in Bhavnagar district, had earned the honorific name "Padamsee" (a corruption of "Padmashree") after he distributed his entire granary to the village during a famine. His original family name was "Charanyas", due to their ancestors being Charanas or court poets.

Padamsee's father, Hassan Padamsee, was an affluent businessman who owned 10 buildings and also ran a glassware and furniture business. His mother, Jenabhai Padamsee, was a home-maker. Akbar Padamsee was one of their eight children; one of his brothers is the actor Alyque Padamsee. Although rich, the family was not well-educated, and neither of his parents had received much education. Alyque and his brothers (but not his sisters) were the first to attend school and learn English there; the parents later picked up a smattering of the language from their sons.

Early in life, he started copying images from The Illustrated Weekly of India magazine in his father's accounts books at their store on Chakla Street, in South Mumbai. He studied at St. Xavier's High School, Fort, and it was here that met his first mentor, his teacher Shirsat, a watercolourist. He first learned this medium, followed by classes on nudes at Charni Road in preparation for his studies at the Sir J.J. School of Art. As a result, he was allowed to join the course directly in its third year. He was still studying fine art at the school, when the Progressive Artists' Group (PAG) was formed in 1947 by Francis Newton Souza, S. H. Raza, and M. F. Husain. The group was to have a lasting impact on Indian art. By the time he received his diploma he was already associated with the group.

Akbar married Solange Gounelle, in Paris in 1954. The couple had one daughter, Raisa Padamsee.

Akbar moved to India in 1968 and lived and worked in Mumbai with his wife Bhanumati Padamsee

He had a number of siblings, but the most notable of them is Alyque Padamsee, who was a celebrated theatre personality & advertising mogul who headed the Lintas Bombay Ad agency.

In the last years of his life, Padamsee and his wife Bhanu are reported to have moved into the Isha Yoga Center, Coimbatore permanently, after having visited the centre a few times several years ago.

== Career ==
In late 1950, Raza was awarded a French government scholarship, and he invited Padamsee to accompany him to Paris. Padamsee left for Paris in 1951, where artist Krishna Reddy introduced him to the surrealist Stanley Hayter, who became his next mentor. Padmasee soon joined his studio, "Atelier 17". His first exhibition was held in Paris in 1952. The artists exhibited anonymously, thus he shared the prize awarded by the French magazine Journal d'Arte with the painter Jean Carzou.

His very first solo show was held at the Jehangir Art Gallery in 1954, and soon he became one of leading artists. He received the Lalit Kala Akademi Fellowship in 1962, a fellowship by the Rockefeller Foundation in 1965 and was subsequently invited to be an artist-in-residence by the University of Wisconsin–Stout. He returned to India in 1967.

As a member of many artistic committees, he took part in the development of the collections of the Bharat Bhawan museum of Bhopal, and created the VIEW (Vision Exchange Workshop). He curated major cultural events and received many distinctions such as the Padma Shri in 2009.

His work is introspective; his "Metascapes" or his "Mirror Images" are abstract images formed from the search for a formal logic. His topics include landscapes, nudes, heads and he has done portraits created in pencil and charcoal. The depth which emerges from his oil-based works, emanates from the coloured matter. This creates a pictorial technique juxtaposing emerging split forms.

He has done, in addition to his painted work, black and white photographs which use light to create dimension. Padamsee always explored new plastic genres; he also explored computers in "Compugraphics".

He lived in South Mumbai with his wife Bhanumati, and worked at his studio in Prabhadevi. He died on 6 January 2020 at the age of 91.

== Filmmaking ==
Between 1969 and 1970, Akbar Padamsee, one of the pioneers of Modern Indian painting, made a rare 16mm experimental film titled Syzygy. This was a silent animation film made up solely of lines and dots and the connections between them. This film was made using a code or algorithm and can now be seen as an early example of generative art. The word syzygy is often used to describe interesting configurations of astronomical objects in general. With its attempt at pure form, it is also a precursor to computer art or digital art, despite being entirely hand-made.

In 2015, filmmaker Ashim Ahluwalia discovered that Padamsee had made a second film that had fallen into obscurity. Titled Events In A Cloud Chamber, was shot on a 16mm Bolex camera. The film ran for six minutes and featured a single image of a dreamlike terrain. Inspired by one of Padamsee's own oil paintings, he had experimented with a new technique of superimposing shapes formed with stencils and a carousel slide projector. The abstract electronic soundtrack was composed in 1969 by Geeta Sarabhai, thereby qualifying her as the first female electronic musician in India.

After just a handful of screenings in 1970, the film was shipped to an art expo in New Delhi where it was misplaced. The reversal print is now lost and no copies exist.

Between 2015 and 2016, Ashim Ahluwalia worked with Padamsee, who was then almost 89 years old, to try and remake the lost film from memory. The filmmaker managed to track down the original tapes of Sarabhai’s score but they had been demagnetized. Ahluwalia’s 2016 film, also called Events In A Cloud Chamber as a result of their collaboration and premiered at the Venice Film Festival followed by screenings at The Museum of Modern Art and other venues, renewing interest in Padamsee’s neglected film work.

Syzygy has recently had a revival screening at the Camden Arts Centre in an exhibition titled “Zigzag Afterlives: film experiments from the 1960s and 1970s in India” by curator Nancy Adajania. It was included in the exhibition “Mud Muses” at the Moderna Museet in Stockholm.

== Publications ==
- Padamsee, Padamsee, Text by Shamlal, Published by Pundole Art Gallery`, 2004
- Padamsee, Works on Paper-Critical Boundaries, Text by Shamlal, Published by Vakils & Sons, 1964
- Padamsee, Work in language, Marg/Pundole gallery, 372 p, 348 ill; Mumbai 2009,
- Padamsee, Works and Words, film by Laurent Brégeat, 55mn, Lalit Kala Akademi, 2010

== Selected solo exhibitions ==
- 2010 'Body Parts', The Loft, Mumbai
- 2010 Pundole Art Gallery, Mumbai
- 2008 'Sensitive Surfaces', Galerie Helene Lamarque, Paris
- 2007 'Metascape to Humanscape', Aicon Gallery, Palo Alto
- 2006 Metascape to Humanscape', Aicon Gallery, New York
- 2006 Photographs (2004–06), Guild Art Gallery, Mumbai
- 2005 Gallery Threshold and the French Embassy in India, New Delhi
- 2004 Retrospective of Watercolors, Pundole Art Gallery, Mumbai
- 2003 'Critical Boundaries', Pundole Art Gallery, Mumbai
- 2002 'Drawing Show', Gallery Chemould, Mumbai
- 2002 'Tertiaries', Pundole Art Gallery, Mumbai
- 1999 'Compugraphics', Pundole Art Gallery, Mumbai and Art Heritage, New Delhi
- 1997 'Imaging Gandhi', Pundole Art Gallery, Mumbai
- 1996 'Female Nudes', Pundole Art Gallery, Mumbai
- 1994 'Mirror Images', Pundole Art Gallery, Mumbai
- 1993 Pundole Art Gallery, Mumbai
- 1993 'Heads', Sakshi Gallery, Bangalore
- 1992 Art Heritage, New Delhi
- 1992 Sanskriti Art Gallery, Kolkata
- 1988 Art Heritage, New Delhi and Cymroza Art Gallery, Mumbai
- 1986 Pundole Art Gallery, Mumbai
- 1980 Retrospective of works organised by Art Heritage, New Delhi and Mumbai
- 1981 Urja Gallery, Baroda
- 1975 Pundole Art Gallery, Mumbai
- 1974 'Metascapes', Pundole Art Gallery, Mumbai
- 1972 'Metascapes', Pundole Art Gallery, Mumbai
- 1967 Museum of Contemporary Art, Montreal
- 1963 Gallery '63, New York
- 1962 Kunika Chemould Art Centre, New Delhi
- 1960 Painting in Grey, Gallery '59, Mumbai
- 1957 Galerie de Ventadour, France
- 1954 Jehangir Art Gallery, Mumbai
- 1953 Gallery Raymond Creure, Paris
- 1952 Galerie Saint Placide, Paris

== Selected group exhibitions ==
- 2010 'The Progressives & Associates', Grosvenor Gallery, London
- 2010 'Masters of Maharashtra', collection from Lalit Kala Akademi, New Delhi at Piramal Gallery, National Centre for the Performing Arts (NCPA), Mumbai
- 2010 'Master's Corner', organised by Indian Contemporary Art Journal at Jehangir Art Gallery, Mumbai; India International Art Fair, New Delhi
- 2010 'Manifestations IV', Delhi Art Gallery, New Delhi
- 2010 'From Miniature to Modern: Traditions in Transition', Rob Dean Art, London in association with Pundole Art Gallery, Mumbai
- 2010 'Figure/Landscape – Part One', Aicon Gallery, New York
- 2010 'Contemporary Printmaking In India', presented by Priyasri Art Gallery, Mumbai at Jehangir Art Gallery, Mumbai; Priyasri Art Gallery, Mumbai
- 2010 'Black is Beautiful', India Fine Art, Mumbai
- 2010 'Black and White', Galerie Mirchandani + Steinruecke, Mumbai
- 2010 'Art Celebrates 2010', represented by Gallery Threshold at Lalit Kala Akademi, New Delhi to coincide with the hosting of the Commonwealth Games
- 2009 'Think Small', Art Alive Art Gallery, New Delhi
- 2009 'Sacred and Secular', India Fine Art, Mumbai
- 2009 'Progressive to Altermodern: 62 Years of Indian Modern Art', Grosvenor Gallery, London
- 2009 'Miniature Format Show 2009 – IInd Part', Sans Tache Gallery, Mumbai
- 2009 'Indian Art After Independence: Selected Works from the Collections of Virginia & Ravi Akhoury and Shelley & Donald Rubin', Emile Lowe Gallery, Hempstead
- 2009 'Bharat Ratna! Jewels of Modern Indian Art', Museum of Fine Arts, Boston
- 2008–09 'Expanding Horizons: Contemporary Indian Art’, Traveling Exhibition presented by Bodhi Art at Ravinder Natya Mandir, P.L. Despande Kala Academy Art Gallery, Mumbai; Sant Dyaneshwar Natya Sankul Art Gallery, Amravati; Platinum Jubilee Hall, Nagpur; Tapadia Natya Mandir Sports Hall, Aurangabad; Hirachand Nemchand Vachanalay's, Solapur; Acharya Vidyanand Sanskrutik Bhavan, Kolhapur; PGSR Sabhagriha, SNDT, Pune; Sarvajanik Vachanalaya Hall, Nasik
- 2008 'Harvest 2008', organised by Arushi Arts at The Stainless Gallery, New Delhi
- 2008 'Faces', Tao Art Gallery, Mumbai
- 2008 ‘The Miniature Format Show – Part I’, Sans Tache, Mumbai
- 2008 ‘Freedom 2008 – Sixty Years of Indian Independence’, Centre for International Modern Art (CIMA), Kolkata
- 2007–08 ‘India Art Now: Between Continuity and Transformation’, Province of Milan, Milan, Italy
- 2007 ‘Winter Show’, Aicon Gallery, Palo Alto
- 2006 'Drawing Show an Act of Art II', Priyasri Art Gallery, Mumbai
- 2006 Centre for International Modern Art (CIMA) Gallery, Kolkata
- 2006 ‘Shadow Lines’, Vadehra Art Gallery, New Delhi
- 2005 Gallery Threshold, New Delhi
- 2005 Contemporary Indian Art, Nehru Center, London
- 2005 ‘Visions of Landscape’, Guild Art Gallery, Mumbai
- 2004 Pundole Art Gallery, Mumbai
- 2004 ‘Concept and Form’, Vadehra Art Gallery, New Delhi
- 2004 ‘Anticipations’, Fine Arts Resource, Mumbai
- 2002 'Words and Images', Guild Art Gallery, Mumbai
- 2002 Saffronart and Pundole Gallery, New York
- 2001 Saffronart and Pundole Gallery, New York
- 2001 'Engendering Images of a Woman', Guild Art Gallery, Mumbai
- 2000 'Rare Collection' Guild Art Gallery, Mumbai
- 1999 'Creative Process', Guild Art Gallery, Mumbai
- 1998 'Drawings', Guild Art Gallery, Mumbai
- 1997 Guild Art Gallery, Mumbai
- 1997 ’50 Years of Indian Art’, Mohile Parikh Centre for Visual Arts (MPCVA), Mumbai
- 1996 ‘Modern & Contemporary Paintings: One Hundred Years’, London
- 1995 Indian Contemporary Paintings, London
- 1994 ‘Mirror-Image Series’, Pundole Art Gallery, Mumbai
- 1993 Sakshi Gallery, Mumbai, Bangalore and Chennai
- 1993 Reflections & Images, Jehangir Art Gallery, Mumbai
- 1992 Sanskrit Art Gallery, Kolkata
- 1992 Group Show with Laxman Shreshtha & Jogen Chowdhury, Pundole Art Gallery, Mumbai
- 1991 ‘State of the Art’ First Computer Art Show in Mumbai, Jehangir Art Gallery, Mumbai
- 1991 ‘National Exhibition of Contemporary Art’, National Gallery of Modern Art (NGMA), New Delhi
- 1990 Cymroza Art Gallery, Mumbai
- 1989 'Timeless Art', Mumbai
- 1988 Cymroza Art Gallery, Mumbai
- 1987 Festival of India in USS.R, Moscow
- 1985 Indian Artists in France
- 1985 'Artistes Indiens en France' Foundation Nationale des Arts Graphiques et Plastiques, Paris
- 1984 Contemporary Indian Painters, Raj Bhavan, Mumbai. Organized by Pundole Art Gallery, Mumbai
- 1982 'Contemporary Indian Art', Festival of India, Royal Academy of Art, London
- 1981 Indian Painting Today, Jehangir Art Gallery, Mumbai
- 1981 'India: Myth & Reality – Aspects of Modern Indian Art’ Museum of Modern Art (MOMA), Oxford
- 1979 ‘Focus’, Gallery Chemould, Mumbai
- 1968 Indian Triennale, New Delhi
- 1963 Venice Biennale, Venice, Italy
- 1963 Gallery '63, New York
- 1963 3rd Paris Biennale, Paris
- 1961 2nd Paris Biennale, Paris
- 1959 Tokyo Biennale, Japan
- 1959 São Paulo Biennale, Brazil
- 1958 ‘Seven Indian Painters’, Gallery One, London
- 1955 Venice Biennale, Venice, Italy
- 1953 Venice Biennale, Venice, Italy
- 1953 Galerie Raymond Creuse, Paris
- 1952 Galerie Saint – Placide, Paris Participations

== Honours and awards ==
- 2004 - Lalit Kala Ratna, Lalit Kala Akademi, New Delhi
- 1997–98 - Kalidas Samman by the Madhya Pradesh Government
- 1969 - Jawaharlal Nehru Fellowship
- 1967 - Artist in Residence, Stout State University, Wisconsin
- 1965 - J.D. Rockefeller IIIrd Fund, Fellowship
