= Sharon Prabhakar =

Musical artist (born 1955)

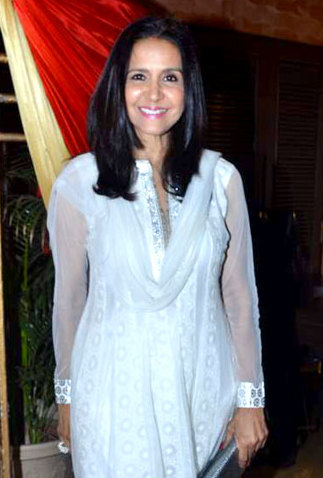

Background information
- Born: 4 August 1955 (age 71); Delhi, India
- Genres: Playback singing, Indipop
- Occupations: Singer, actress
- Years active: 1981–present
- Website: sharonprabhakar.com

Sharon Prabhakar (born 4 August 1955) is an Indian pop singer, actress and public speaker.

== Personal life ==
Prabhakar was born to a Punjabi father who was a public servant, and a Christian mother who was a music teacher. Along with her brother and sister, she had a mixed upbringing, growing up speaking both Punjabi and English.

When she was in her twenties, she married Bryan Mascarenhas, though they later divorced.

In 1986, Prabhakar married Alyque Padamsee, with whom she has a daughter, Shazahn Padamsee. The couple have since separated.

== Background ==
In the past, Prabhakar has been referred to by India Today as one of Bombay's most talented folk singers with a style reminiscent of Joan Baez. By the mid-1980s, she achieved recognition and fame for singing in popular overseas styles in Hindi language. According to an article in The Hindustan Times, even before artists such as Alisha Chinai, Baba Sehgal and Daler Mehndi were described as Indi-pop, she was the original pop star of Hindi music that wasn't related to films. She achieved popularity in Hindi pop and disco. During her career, she has shared the stage with Celine Dion, represented India abroad and sung for members of the White House.

== Music career ==
=== 1980s to 1990s ===
Prabhakar had involvement in the production of Obsession '77, an album by psychedelic and hard rock band Atomic Forest.

In 1980, her album Feeling Good was released on the Polydor label.

Sharon also had sung an English song for a Kannada movie. The song is I wake up in the middle of the night for the movie : Udayavagali cheluva namma Kannada naadu Record Label The Gramophone Company of India Limited Record number :7EPE 11504

An important milestone in Sharon's career is the song "Haan meri jaisi haseena ka dil" from the Bollywood movie Armaan released in 1981.The song became a huge hit and is listened in 2026 as well, created by none other than Bappi Lahiri.

=== 2000s ===
In 2007, her album Dilrooba was released via Raga to Rock. In January 2019, Prabhakar was performing at the SoBo Festival. She invited politician Milind Deora to come up on stage and perform with her. Milind is a musician in his own right and a blues guitarist.

== Discography ==
SinglesIndian releases
Title	Release info	Year	Format	Notes
Chal Disco Chal "Chal Disco Chal", "Dekho Dekho" / "Daku Daku", "Mere Habib"	Multitone Records Ltd. 2222 814	1981	7-inch EP	with Musarrat Nazir
"What A Wonder It Will Be" / "Don't Ever Leave Me"	Polydor 2067 839	1981	7-inch single	with Bashir Sheikh
"Aaj Ki Raat" / "Chhupke Kaun Aya"	Outernational Sounds OTR 6	2019	7-inch single	Sharon Prabhakar only on side A Usha Uthup only on side B

AlbumsIndian releases
Title	Release info	Year	Format	Notes
Feeling Good	Polydor 2392921	1980	LP	
Chal Disco Chal	Polydor 2392 996	1981	LP	with Musarrat Nazir, Peter Moss and Deepak Khazanchi
Musical Multiplication Tables	Multi-Sound 2392 567	1981	LP	
What A Wonder...	Polydor 2392 952	1981	LP	with Bashir Sheikh
Disco Mastana	Multitone 2393 850	1982	LP	
London Calling (The Best From The West – Hindi Disco Hits)	Multitone 2393 893	1983	LP	with Salma Agha and Nazia Hassan
Shabash Sharon	EMI ECSD 2982; His Master's Voice ECSD. 2982	1984	LP	
Pyar Chhalke	Music for Pleasure MFPE 1051	1985	LP	with Bappi Lahiri
Shararat	Master's Voice PSLP 1401; Odeon PSLP 1401	1986	LP	music by Anand Milind
Suno Suno	Music India CDNF043	1988	compact disc	
Burning	Padmini Music PP – 304	1996	compact disc	

== Filmography ==
=== Films ===
Year	Title	Role	Notes
1986	Kahan Kahan Se Guzar Gaya	Sonali	Also playback singer; Unreleased
1988	Akarshan	Shalu	
1988	Ek Aadmi		
1995	Rock Dancer	Jaya	Also playback singer
2008	Saas Bahu Aur Sensex	Jasbir Brar	
2019	Bombairiya	Nandini's mother	

=== Web series ===
Year	Title	Role	Platform	Notes
2020	Kehne Ko Humsafar Hain	Ananya and Amairas' mother	ALTBalaji and ZEE5	Season 3
2025	Hai Junoon!	Dean	JioHotstar	

=== Television ===
Year	Title	Role	Platform	Notes
2010	Mahi Way	Ramona Kohli	Sony Entertainment Television	Season 1
2017	The Good Karma Hospital	Bina Barros	ITV	Season 1 episode 4
