= Paheli (2005 film) =

2005 Indian film by Amol Palekar

- Theatrical release poster
- Directed by: Amol Palekar
- Screenplay by: Sandhya Gokhale
- Story by: Vijayadan Detha
- Based on: Duvidha by Vijayadan Detha
- Produced by: Gauri Khan
- Starring: Shah Rukh Khan; Rani Mukerji
- Narrated by: Naseeruddin Shah; Ratna Pathak
- Cinematography: Ravi K. Chandran
- Edited by: Amitabh Shukla; Steven H. Bernard
- Music by: Songs: M. M. Kreem; Score: Aadesh Shrivastava
- Production company: Red Chillies Entertainment
- Distributed by: Shree Ashtavinayak Cine Vision (India); Eros International (Worldwide)
- Release date: 24 June 2005
- Running time: 141 minutes
- Country: India
- Language: Hindi
- Budget: ₹140 million
- Box office: ₹320 million

Paheli (translation: Riddle) is a 2005 Indian Hindi-language fantasy film directed by Amol Palekar and produced by Gauri Khan. The film tells the story of a wife (Rani Mukerji) whose husband (Shah Rukh Khan) goes on a business trip and is visited by a ghost, disguised as her husband, who is in love with her and takes her husband's place. The supporting cast includes Anupam Kher, Amitabh Bachchan, Juhi Chawla and Suniel Shetty. Based on the Rajasthani short story "Duvidha" by Vijayadan Detha.

Paheli opened at the 9th Zimbabwe International Film Festival at the Libertie Cinema Complex in Harare. It was also screened at both the Sundance Film Festival and the Palm Springs International Film Festival. The working title of the movie was Ghost Ka Dost (translates to Friend of a Ghost ). Paheli was India's official entry to the 79th Academy Awards.

Paheli was released on 24 June 2005, and proved to be a moderate commercial success at the box office, grossing ₹32 crore worldwide. It received mixed-to-positive reviews from critics upon release, with praise for its production design, cinematography, costumes, and special effects; however, its story and screenplay received criticism.

At the 51st Filmfare Awards, Paheli received 2 nominations – Best Lyricist (Gulzar for "Dheere Jalna") and Best Male Playback Singer (Sonu Nigam for "Dheere Jalna"). At the 53rd National Film Awards, the film won Best Female Playback Singer (Shreya Ghoshal for "Dheere Jalna").

Detha's story, which had earlier been adapted into the 1973 film by Mani Kaul, and the 1997 Kannada film Nagamandala by T. S. Nagabharana (based on a play of the same name by Girish Karnad, the 1997 film also reportedly inspired Paheli), are folkloric in origin. Though Paheli diverges from its source material and the earlier adaptations in giving the plot and its lead female character a more feminist agency.

== Plot ==
The film is narrated by two puppets, voiced by Naseeruddin Shah and Ratna Pathak Shah.

A young, enthusiastic Rajasthani village girl, Lachchi (Rani Mukerji), has an arranged marriage with Kishanlal (Shah Rukh Khan), the workaholic son of wealthy merchant Bhanwarlal (Anupam Kher), from a distant village. While travelling from her home to her in-laws' home, the party stops to rest at a dharamshala (spiritual dwelling), which is rumoured to be the host to 128 ghosts. At the dharamshala, a ghost sees Lachchi and is taken by her beauty. The ghost follows Lachchi and she can sense a presence and gets really scared. Later, on their marriage night, Lachchi is shocked to learn that Kishanlal, who is a dutiful son, will honour his father's wish to begin a new, far-away business on a predetermined auspicious date, which happens to be the very next day. On the night, Kishanlal turns away from his wife to finish his bookkeeping and, in the early morning hours, sets off on a business trip to Jamnagar that is to last five years. Lachchi is devastated, but Kishanlal's sister-in-law, Gajrobai (Juhi Chawla), consoles her, empathising on the grounds that Gajrobai's husband, Sunderlal (Suniel Shetty), has also disappeared without informing the family.

The ghost sees Kishanlal leaving the village and assumes a human form to speak to Kishanlal at a watering hole. The ghost learns that Kishanlal is leaving on family business for the next five years. The next day, the ghost appears in Bhanwarlal's house, having taken Kishanlal's shape and voice because of his own attachment to Lachchi. The ghost tells Bhanwarlal that during his voyage he met a sage who took great care of him. The sage was happy with his treatment and granted him a boon for five gold coins every single morning for the rest of his life. Bhanwarlal forgets everything and accepts Kishanlal back into the house. Despite pretending to be Kishanlal in front of everyone else in the house, the ghost reveals his true identity to Lachchi at night. Lachchi is thus presented with a dilemma between the representation of all of her desires in the form of the ghost who has taken the form of her real husband. She takes this newfound, sensual, magical, social, and self-confident version of Kishanlal as hers.

As Kishanlal, the ghost befriends all of the real Kishanlal's family. However, his only blunder is in his treatment of Kishanlal's servant, Bhoja (Rajpal Yadav), who is perplexed by the idea that Kishanlal has sent a letter from his business trip only to receive it himself in his own house and is offended when the ghost (who appears as Kishanlal) does not offer him a glass of water. Bhoja returns to Jamnagar and confronts the real Kishanlal on how he is back and forth from Navalgarh before himself. Kishanlal believes Bhoja to be a drunkard who never reached Navalgarh and has hence returned empty-handed without a letter or any supplies. Meanwhile, the ghost wants to make the two young camels of the house participate in a race. Bhanwarlal is against this, as he believes that Kishanlal's brother, Sunderlal, left home after being embarrassed for losing a similar race seven years ago. The ghost convinces Bhanwarlal that if he wins the race, Sunderlal might return home. At the race, the ghost uses his bag of magic tricks to confuse all the other camels and helps the house camels to win, reclaiming the lost family honour.

After two years, the real Kishanlal again sends a message home through Bhoja, but Bhoja's wife burns the letter this time as she has not forgotten the insult to Bhoja from two years ago. Lachchi and the ghost live blissfully together for four years, and Lachchi then falls pregnant with the ghost's child. The real Kishanlal returns to find out if the rumours about his wife's pregnancy are true and is shocked to find the ghost in his (Kishanlal's) own form, while Lachchi goes into early labour pain at the same time. The family initially considers the real Kishanlal to be an imposter and disregards him, but he produces many witnesses and evidences of his authenticity. However, the society, specifically the Thakurs who lost the camel race, force Bhanwarlal to ascertain the truth as they are searching for an opportunity to avenge their dishonour at the camel race by slinging mud at Bhanwarlal's family. While Lachchi gives birth to a baby girl, Lunima, Sunderlal also returns home, and apologises to Gajrobai for his disappearance for so long, and reunites with his family.

Kishanlal's family is unable to determine which of the doppelgangers is the real Kishanlal (the ghost refusing to confess) and decides to visit the raja so that he can arbitrate. On their way to the raja, Kishanlal's family meets an old shepherd, Gadariya (Amitabh Bachchan), who helps them out by placing three tests in front of the real Kishanlal. He tells everyone that the one who can lift hot coals will prove himself as Bhanwarlal's real son, the one who can gather his sheep in time will prove himself as the real husband of Lachchi, and the one who can enter his water bottle will prove himself as the real lover of Lachchi. Kishanlal tries his best to perform the first two, which the ghost does not even bother to try. When Gadariya states "the real lover of Lachchi," the ghost performs the third, impossible feat and enters the water bottle, simply to prove his love for Lachchi. In this way, the real Kishanlal is discovered, and Gadariya quickly closes his bottle so that the ghost would be unable to exit it.

Following this revelation, the real Kishanlal throws away the bottle in the middle of the desert, and everyone returns home. Lachchi is devastated over the loss of the ghost. In a twist ending, it is revealed that the ghost had already escaped from the bottle and taken possession of Kishanlal's body to live with Lachchi. While Lachchi tries to confess to her husband that the ghost had not betrayed her and she did cheat him with ghost, the ghost exposes his identity to Lachchi by reminding her of the name they were originally going to give their daughter. Thus, Lachchi begins living happily with both her real husband and her ghost lover in the same body. The two puppets end the story, remarking that this is a very old folk tale.

== Cast ==
- Shah Rukh Khan in a dual role as Kishanlal / Mufasaka
- Rani Mukerji as Lachchi
- Anupam Kher as Bhanwarlal: Kishanlal's father
- Amitabh Bachchan as Gadariya: the shepherd (special appearance)
- Naseeruddin Shah as Male puppet (voice only)
- Ratna Pathak Shah as Female puppet (voice only)
- Juhi Chawla as Gajrobai: Kishanlal's sister-in-law
- Suniel Shetty as Sunderlal: Kishanlal's estranged brother (special appearance)
- Neena Kulkarni as Kishanlal's mother
- Sharvari Jamenis as Rakma: Kishanlal's sister
- Dilip Prabhavalkar as Kanwarlal: Kishanlal's uncle
- Rajpal Yadav as Bhoja: Kishanlal's servant
- Aditi Govitrikar as Kamli: Lachchi’s relative
- Palak Jain as Anusuya: Kishanlal's cousin (Child artist)
- A. K. Hangal as Jeevraj
- Aasif Sheikh as Ghost

== Production ==
In 2004, Palekar went to Shah Rukh Khan with a request for a hearing. After listening to the script, Khan asked Palekar if he could produce it as well as star in it. According to Khan, Paheli is a woman's liberation film that deals with the issues of marriage and asks whether a woman must stay with a man only due to marriage and not out of love.

Kajol was the original choice for the role of Lachchi, but she refused the role as she did not like it. The role was then offered to Aishwarya Rai, Tabu and Sushmita Sen respectively, but all of them declined. Rani Mukherjee was then signed on.

The film was shot entirely in Rajasthan (Jhunjhunu district) over a period of 45 days. A scene involving Bachchan and Khan in the desert was shot in Mumbai on a helipad. One of the scenes was filmed at the Hadi Rani Kund (often confused with Chand Baori) of Todaraisingh.

== Reception ==
=== Critical reception ===
Paheli was submitted as India's official entry to the 79th Academy Awards.

Taran Adarsh from Bollywood Hungama gave it 4/5 stars and said: "On the whole, Paheli is one of the finest films produced in recent times. A film like this proves yet again that we don't need to seek inspiration from outsiders [read Hollywood], when Indian literature is rich enough to provide us with captivating stories." Raja Sen from Rediff.com called it "A breathtaking dream!", and said: "First things first, this is the best-looking Indian film in a very long time, and ranks up there with the finest ever. Palekar has crafted a delectable fairytale that is incredibly well-shot. Ravi K. Chandran's cinematography is spellbinding as he casts us into the fabulous sandscapes of Rajasthan with fluid harmony. Each frame of the film is picture-perfect, marinated in intoxicating colour. Watching Paheli is quite an experience, and it's from the very opening shot of the film that its sheer, magical palette overwhelms us." It was featured in The Ten Best Indian Films of 2005 list by Rediff.com, ranked third.

=== Box office ===
Paheli saw 90% occupancy during its opening. The film had a total net gross of ₹187.5 million (US$1.9 million) in India and an additional US$3.63 million in the overseas market. It was declared an "average" in India, but a "hit" abroad. It proved to be a safe and profitable venture for its distributors.

== Soundtrack ==
Paheli

Soundtrack album to Paheli by M. M. Kreem
- Released: 6 May 2005
- Recorded: 2005
- Genre: Feature film soundtrack
- Length: 44:53
- Language: Hindi
- Label: T-Series

M. M. Kreem chronology
Jagapati (2005)	Paheli (2005)	Anukokunda Oka Roju (2005)

The film's soundtrack is composed and produced by M. M. Kreem with lyrics by Gulzar. The soundtrack for the film released on 6 May 2005. The song "Dheere Jalna" is based on "Nadira Dhinna" from Okariki Okaru (2003).

Track listing

No.	Title	Singer(s)	Length
1.	"Dheere Jalna"	Sonu Nigam, Shreya Ghoshal	06:08
2.	"Kangna Re"	Shreya Ghoshal, Madhushree, Bela Shende, Kalapini Komkali, Sonu Nigam	05:55
3.	"Khaali Hai"	Hariharan, Bela Shende	05:58
4.	"Laaga Re Jal Laaga"	M. M. Keeravani, Sonu Nigam, Shruti Sadolikar	05:51
5.	"Minnat Kare"	Shreya Ghoshal, Madhushree, Bela Shende	07:25
6.	"Phir Raat Kati"	Sunidhi Chauhan, Sukhwinder Singh	03:45
7.	"Phir Raat Kati" (Remix)	Sunidhi Chauhan, Sukhwinder Singh	03:45
8.	"Dheere Jalna" (Instrumental)		06:06

- Music Label – T-Series

== Awards ==
Paheli received several awards and nominations at multiple award ceremonies.

Award	Category	Recipients and nominees	Results
53rd National Film Awards	Best Female Playback Singer	Shreya Ghoshal for "Dheere Jalna"	Won
51st Filmfare Awards	Best Lyricist	Gulzar for "Dheere Jalna"	Nominated
51st Filmfare Awards	Best Male Playback Singer	Sonu Nigam for "Dheere Jalna"	Nominated
2006 Zee Cine Awards	Best Art Direction	Muneesh Sappal	Won
2006 Zee Cine Awards	Best Film Processing	R. Mittal	Won
2006 Zee Cine Awards	Best Actor	Shahrukh Khan	Nominated
2006 Zee Cine Awards	Best Male Playback Singer	Sonu Nigam for "Dheere Jalna"	Nominated
2006 Zee Cine Awards	Best Choreography	Farah Khan for "Kangna Re"	Nominated
2006 Zee Cine Awards	Best Cinematography	Ravi K. Chandran	Nominated
2006 Zee Cine Awards	Best Costume Design	Shalini Sarna	Nominated
2006 Zee Cine Awards	Best Publicity Design	R. D. Parinja	Nominated
2006 Zee Cine Awards	Best Audiography	Anuj Mathur	Nominated
2006 Star Screen Awards	Best Art Direction	Muneesh Sappal	Won
2006 Star Screen Awards	Best Male Playback Singer	Sonu Nigam for "Dheere Jalna"	Won
2006 Star Screen Awards	Best Actor	Shahrukh Khan	Nominated
2006 Star Screen Awards	Best Cinematography	Ravi K. Chandran	Nominated
2006 Star Screen Awards	Best Music Director	M. M. Keeravani	Nominated
2006 Star Screen Awards	Best Lyricist	Gulzar for "Dheere Jalna"	Nominated
2006 Star Screen Awards	Best Choreographer	Farah Khan for "Kangna Re"	Nominated
