= Daud (film) =

- Poster
- Directed by: Ram Gopal Varma
- Written by: Kanan Ayar; Sanjay Chhel; Ram Gopal Varma
- Based on: Kshana Kshanam by Ram Gopal Varma
- Produced by: Ram Gopal Varma; Jhamu Sughand
- Starring: Sanjay Dutt; Urmila Matondkar; Paresh Rawal; Manoj Bajpayee
- Cinematography: Rasool Ellore
- Edited by: Bhanodaya
- Music by: A. R. Rahman
- Distributed by: Murlimanohar Creations
- Release date: 22 August 1997
- Running time: 174 minutes
- Country: India
- Language: Hindi
- Budget: ₹77.5 million
- Box office: ₹147.9 million

Daud (Hindi pronunciation: [d̪ɔːɽ]; transl. Run) is a 1997 Indian Hindi-language road adventure comedy film written and directed by Ram Gopal Varma, starring Sanjay Dutt and Urmila Matondkar, with music composed by A. R. Rahman. The film was based on Ram Gopal Varma's 1991 Telugu film Kshana Kshanam, which starred Venkatesh, Sridevi and Paresh Rawal. Daud was not commercially successful.

== Plot ==
The affable Nandu is a small-time crook who is hired to deliver a mysterious package to a notorious criminal named Pinky. Feeling that he is being cheated out of his delivery fee, Nandu holds out for more money, and soon finds himself on the run from both the angry gangsters and the police, who have launched a massive manhunt.

Nandu and Bhavani, the lovely cabaret dancer who's tagging along for the ride, assume the package contains gold; both are unpleasantly surprised when it turns out to be something deadlier: a nuclear bomb.

== Cast ==
- Sanjay Dutt as Nandu/Uma Parvati
- Urmila Matondkar as Bhavani/Daya Shankar
- Paresh Rawal as Pinky
- Neeraj Vora as Chacko
- Ashish Vidyarthi as Nair
- Manoj Bajpayee as Pushkar
- Vineet Kumar as Inspector Sri
- Narsing Yadav as Inspector Rana
- Jeetu Shastri as Joseph
- Rajeev Mehta as Khurana
- Rana Jung Bahadur as Commissioner of police
- Sumukhi Pendse as Suvarna

== Reception ==
Anupama Chopra of India Today wrote, "Despite the flaws, Daud makes for fun-watching."

== Soundtrack ==
Daud

Soundtrack album by A. R. Rahman
- Released: 6 June 1997
- Recorded: Panchathan Record Inn
- Genre: Film soundtrack
- Label: Tips
- Producer: A.R. Rahman

A. R. Rahman chronology
Iruvar (1997)	Daud (1997)	Ratchagan (1997)

The score and soundtrack were composed by A. R. Rahman, who also scored Rangeela. The lyrics were written by Mehboob, except for the song "Daud" which was penned by Sukhwinder Singh. One of the songs, "Zehreela Pyar" came heavily under the censor scanner for its rather bold picturization.

The soundtrack was re-released in Tamil as a non-film album titled Ottam and was dubbed in Telugu as 50–50.

=== Hindi - Original version ===
All lyrics are written by Mehboob, except where noted.

No.	Title	Singer(s)	Length
1.	"Daud" (Lyricist:Sukhwinder Singh)	Remo Fernandes	5:51
2.	"Zehreela Pyar"	Asha Bhosle & Deena Chandra Das	5:57
3.	"Shabba Shabba (movie version)"	Swarnalatha (Original version), Ranu Mukherjee(Movie version), Sonu Nigam & Neeraj Vora	7:42
4.	"Shabba Shabba (album version)"	Ranu Mukherjee, Sonu Nigam & Neeraj Vora	7:42
5.	"The Thump of Daud"	A. R. Rahman	3:22
6.	"Yeh Jaan"	Kavita Krishnamurthy & Vinod Rathod	6:52
7.	"O Bhavre"	K. J. Yesudas & Asha Bhosle	6:08
8.	"Daud (Bhangra)"	Usha Uthup	5:51
9.	"Oh! Sai Yaiye"	Asha Bhosle & S. P. Balasubrahmanyam	8:50

=== 50–50 (Telugu dubbed version) ===
50-50

Soundtrack album by A. R. Rahman
- Released: 9 July 1997
- Recorded: Panchathan Record Inn
- Genre: Film soundtrack
- Label: Tips
- Producer: A. R. Rahman

A. R. Rahman chronology
Iruvar (1997)	50-50 (1997)	Ratchagan (1997)

All songs were written by Sirivennela Seetharama Sastry

#	Song	Artist(s)	Length
1	"Parugu Parugu Ra"	Vandemataram Srinivas & Remo Fernandes	5:51
2	"Kasirepi"	K. S. Chithra, Deena Chandra Das	5:57
3	"Shabba Shabba"	Swarnalatha, S. P. Balasubrahmanyam & Srinivas Murthy	7:42
4	"The Thump of Daud"	A. R. Rahman	3:22
5	"Ee Praayam Needhe Ra"	K. S. Chithra & P. Unnikrishnan	6:52
6	"O Meghamaa"	Sujatha Mohan, Unni Menon, Asha Bhosle	6:08
7	"Sy Saiyyante"	Swarnalatha, S. P. Balasubrahmanyam & Asha Bhosle	8:50

=== Ottam (Tamil dubbed version) ===
Ottam

Soundtrack album by A. R. Rahman
- Released: 5 July 1997
- Recorded: Panchathan Record Inn
- Genre: Film soundtrack
- Label: Tips
- Producer: A. R. Rahman

A. R. Rahman chronology
Iruvar (1997)	Ottam (1997)	Ratchagan (1997)

Though the Tamil dubbed version of the film remains unreleased, the soundtrack album released.

All songs were written by Palani Bharathi

#	Song	Artist(s)	Length
1	"Ottam Thaan"	Mano & Remo Fernandes	5:51
2	"Sooriyanaai"	K. S. Chithra & Deena Chandra Das	5:57
3	"The Thump of Daud"	A. R. Rahman	3:22
4	"Shabba Shabba"	Swarnalatha, S. P. Balasubrahmanyam & Srinivasa Murthy	7:42
5	"En Kadhal Neruppe"	K. S. Chithra & P. Unni Krishnan	6:52
6	"Poonthendrale"	Sujatha Mohan, K. J. Yesudas & Asha Bhosle	6:08
7	"Oh! Vandhaale"	Swarnalatha & S. P. Balasubrahmanyam	8:50
