= Alyque Padamsee =

Indian actor

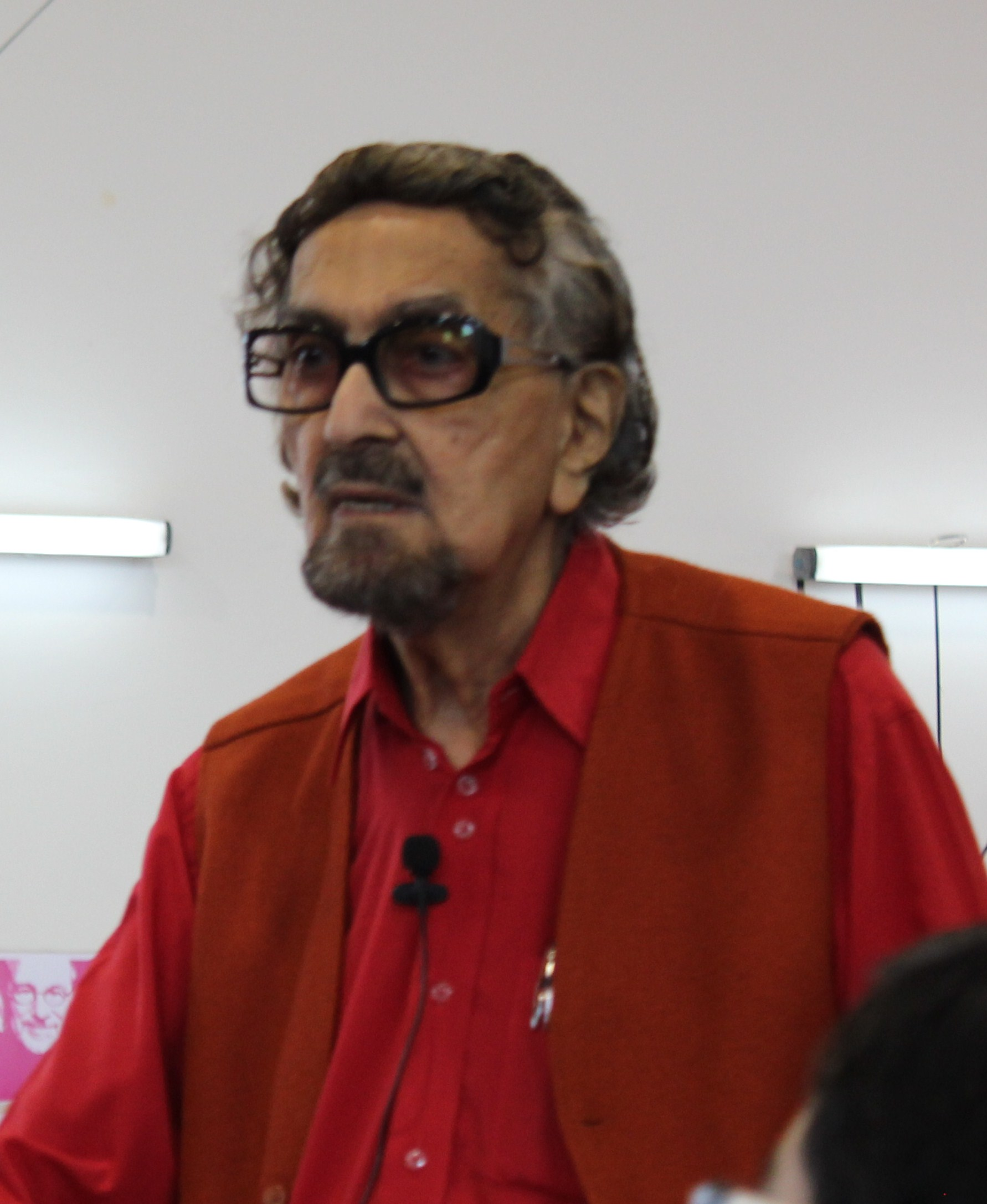
- Padamsee in 2012
- Born: 5 March 1928; Bombay, Bombay Presidency, British India
- Died: 17 November 2018 (aged 90); Mumbai, Maharashtra, India
- Occupations: Theatre personality, Ad-film maker
- Spouse(s): Pearl Padamsee (divorced); Dolly Thakore (divorced); Sharon Prabhakar (separated)
- Children: 3, including Shazahn Padamsee
- Relatives: Akbar Padamsee (cousin); Raisa Padamsee (niece)

Alyque Padamsee (5 March 1928 – 17 November 2018) was an Indian theatre personality and ad film maker. He played Muhammad Ali Jinnah in the 1982 British period film Gandhi. He was conferred with Padma Shri in 2000.

Besides being involved in Indian theatre as an actor and producer, Padamsee was an advertising professional who once headed the advertising company Lintas Bombay.

== Early life and education ==
Padamsee was born in Bombay in 1928 into a traditional Ismaili Khoja Muslim family hailing from the Kutch region of Gujarat. The ancestors of the Padamsee family originally belonged to the Charan community of Kutch who later converted to Islam. The family had been settled in the nearby Kathiawar region for some generations; Padamsee's grandfather, who had been the sarpanch (headman) of Vāghnagar, a village in Bhavnagar district, was famous for having distributed his entire granary to the village during a famine.

Padamsee's father, Jafferseth Padamsee, was an affluent businessman who owned 10 buildings and also ran a glassware and furniture business. His mother, Kulsumbai Padamsee, was a home-maker. She was Jaffer Padamsee's second wife; they had eight children. Her eldest son was Sultan Padamsee, also known as Bobby, a theatre actor who was reportedly gay and died by suicide at the age of twenty-three. Alyque was born after three girls; one of his older sisters, Zarina, was the wife of Hamid Sayani, brother of Ameen Sayani. Another of his sisters was Roshan Alkazi, wife of Ebrahim Alkazi. One of Padamsee's (distant) cousins is the painter Akbar Padamsee, son of Hasanali Padamsee. Although rich, this trading family was not well-educated, and neither of his parents had finished school. Alyque and his brothers (but not his sisters) were the first in the family to attend school and learn English there; the parents later picked up a smattering of the language from their sons. Raised in an extremely traditional environment, in a devout Muslim family, Padamsee described himself as an agnostic who disclaimed all religion by the age of 18. He was educated at St. Xavier's College, Mumbai.

== Personal life ==
Padamsee's first wife was Pearl Padamsee, a Christian born to a Baghdadi Jewish mother and a Christian father. Pearl had been previously married; her first husband had been a Hindu, and she had two children by that marriage, a daughter named Rohini (1951–1961) and a son, Ranjit Chowdhry (1955–2020). Rohini Chowdhry died at age 10, very shortly after Pearl and Padamsee got married. Ranjit became an actor and died in 2020. Padamsee and Pearl had one daughter together, Raell Padamsee, who runs the acting school founded by her mother. Padamsee and Pearl were divorced not long after the birth of Raeel, but Pearl chose to retain her married name 'Padamsee' for the rest of her life.

After his first divorce, Padamsee had an extended relationship with Dolly Thakore, another Christian. She had also been previously married to a Hindu, Dilip Thakore, and divorced him to cohabit with Padamsee. For all intents and purposes, Padamsee and Dolly were assumed to be husband and wife by the world. They had a son together, Quasar Thakore-Padamsee, also a theatre professional.

After separating from Dolly, Padamsee married Sharon Prabhakar, another Christian who was twenty-seven years younger than him. Born to a Hindu father and a Christian mother, Sharon had previously been married to Bryan Mascarenhas. Padamsee and Sharon had a daughter together, Shazahn Padamsee. Like all her father's other children and step-children, Shazahn is an actress.

== Advertising ==
For 14 years, Padamsee was the Chief Executive who built Lintas India to be one of the top agencies in the country. He went on to become the Regional Co-ordinator of Lintas South Asia. Known as the 'Father of Modern Indian Advertising', Padamsee has built over 100 brands. He was the only Indian to be voted into the International Clio Hall of Fame, the Oscars of World Advertising. He was Chairman of the London Institute of Corporate Training at which he conducted courses on leadership training and ideation. His best seller book on Advertising entitled A Double Life is prescribed in business schools.

Padamsee created Lalitaji for Surf, Cherry Charlie for Cherry Blossom Shoe Polish, the MRF Muscle Man, the Liril girl in the waterfall, the Kamasutra couple, Hamara Bajaj, the TV detective Karamchand, the Fair & Handsome brand, etc. Recently he created the Idea of a Fatwa against Terrorism which was announced by the Grand Mufti of the Deoband Uloom. For the Golden Jubilee of The Indian Institute Technology Bombay his idea of starting an initiative to create 10 Great Ideas That Will Change The World In The Next 50 Years caused a great deal of excitement. He was also working on AIDS Prevention Idea with the Dept. of Biotechnology.

He was the CEO of AP Advertising Pvt. Ltd., a firm of Image and Communications Consultants, who have provided consultancy services to a number of national and multinational companies, as Creative Advisor.

== Theatre ==
Padamsee is also known for his English language theatre productions in India like Evita, Jesus Christ Superstar, Tuglaq, and his latest, Broken Images, which was invited to the Kennedy Center in Washington, DC in 2011. He was conferred the Lifetime Achievement Award for Theatre by the Sangeet Natak Akademi; and this January the Tagore Ratna. Internationally, he is known for his portrayal of Muhammad Ali Jinnah in Sir Richard Attenborough's Gandhi.

He worked for the Citizens for Justice & Peace, the Citizens Action Group, and he was on the Advisory Council of the Indian Institute of Technology (IIT Bombay). Earlier he worked as Communications Advisor to Chandrababu Naidu, the former Chief Minister of Andhra Pradesh State. Recently he was appointed to the Prime Minister's AIDS Task Force (Earlier served as Advisor to Prime Minister Rajiv Gandhi on Commercial Television).

Year	Title	Role	Notes
1982	Gandhi	Muhammad Ali Jinnah	

== Awards ==
- The President of India conferred on him the Padmashri in 2000.
- The Advertising Club of Mumbai named him "Advertising Man of the Century".
- Received Sangeet Natak Akademi Tagore Ratna in 2012.

== Bibliography ==
A Double Life: My Exciting Years In Theatres and Advertising (autobiography)
