= Saankal =

- Theatrical release poster
- Directed by: Dedipya Joshii
- Screenplay by: Dedipya Joshii
- Produced by: Pisceann Pictures; Dedipya Joshii; Aanand Rathore
- Starring: Chetan Sharma; Tanima Bhattacharya; Harish Kumar; Jagat Singh; Samarth Shandilya; Milind Gunaji
- Cinematography: Raut Jaywant Murlidhar
- Edited by: Jeetu Rall
- Music by: Songs: Shivang Upadhyay; Nishant Kamal Vyas; Background score: Shivang Upadhyay
- Release date: August 2015 (Indie Gathering Film Fest)
- Running time: 99 minutes
- Country: India
- Language: Hindi

Saankal (transl. Shackle) is a 2015 Indian Hindi-language drama and social problem film written and directed by Dedipya Joshii. The film stars Chetan Sharma, Tanima Bhattacharya, Harish Kumar, Jagat Singh, Samarth Shandilya and Milind Gunaji. It focuses on the impact of forced marriage traditions prevalent within rural Indian communities. The film was released in August 2015.
