= Vanraj Bhatia =

Indian composer (1927–2021)

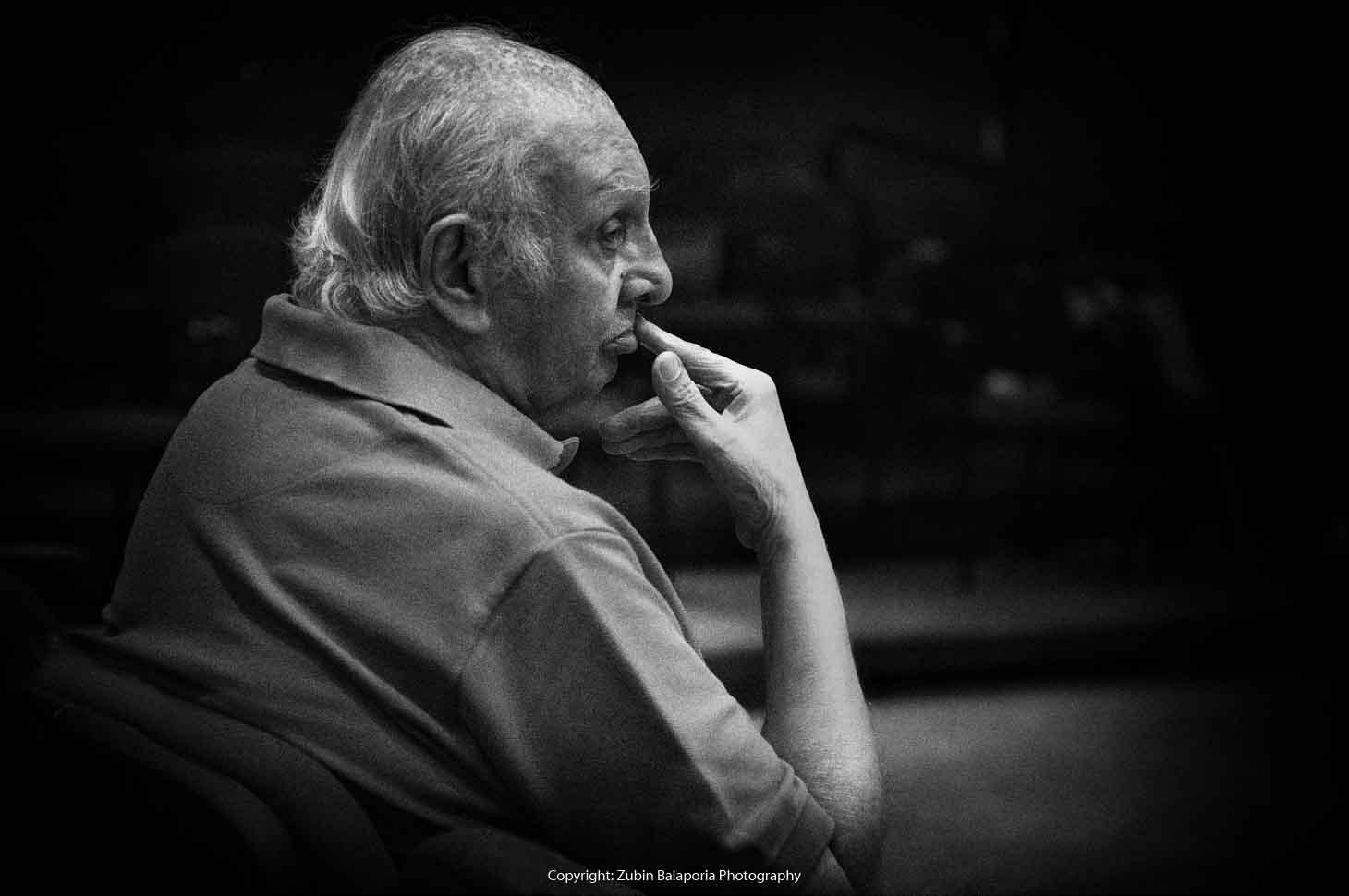
- Bhatia in Mumbai, c. 2015
- Born: 31 May 1927; Bombay, Bombay Presidency, British India
- Died: 5 May 2021 (aged 93); Mumbai, Maharashtra, India

Vanraj Bhatia (Hindi: वनराज भाटिया /vənˈrɑːj bhɑːtiɑː/ vun-RAHJ BHAH-tiah; 31 May 1927 – 7 May 2021) was an Indian composer best known for his work in Indian New Wave cinema. He was also one of the leading composers of Western classical music in India.

Bhatia was a recipient of the National Film Award for Best Music Direction for the television film Tamas (1988), the Sangeet Natak Akademi Award for Creative and Experimental Music (1989) and India's fourth-highest civilian honour, the Padma Shri (2012). He died in Mumbai in May 2021.

== Biography ==
=== Early life and education ===
Born into a family of Kutchi businessmen, Bhatia attended the New Era School in Bombay and learnt Hindustani classical music as a student at Deodhar School of Music. On hearing Tchaikovsky's Piano Concerto No. 1 as a teenager, he became interested in Western classical music and studied the piano with Dr. Manek Bhagat for four years.

After earning his M.A. (English Honours) from Elphinstone College, University of Bombay in 1949, Bhatia studied composition with Howard Ferguson, Alan Bush and William Alwyn at the Royal Academy of Music, London, where he was a recipient of the Sir Michael Costa Scholarship (1951–54). After graduating with a gold medal in 1954, Bhatia won a Rockefeller Scholarship (1954–58) as well as a French Government Scholarship (1957–58) that allowed him to study with Nadia Boulanger at the Conservatoire de Paris for five years.

=== Career ===
On returning to India in 1959, Bhatia became the first person to score music for an advertisement film in India (for Shakti Silk Sarees), and went on to compose over 7,000 jingles, for brands such as Liril, Garden Vareli and Dulux. During this time, he was also a Reader in Western Musicology at the University of Delhi from 1960 to 1965.

Bhatia's first feature film score was for Shyam Benegal's directorial debut Ankur (1974), and he went on to score almost all of Benegal's work, including the song "Mero Gaam Katha Parey" from the film Manthan (1976). Bhatia predominantly worked with filmmakers in the Indian New Wave movement, such as Govind Nihalani (Tamas, which won Bhatia a National Film Award for Best Music Direction), Kundan Shah (Jaane Bhi Do Yaaro), Aparna Sen (36 Chowringhee Lane), Saeed Akhtar Mirza (Mohan Joshi Haazir Ho!), Kumar Shahani (Tarang), Vidhu Vinod Chopra (Khamosh), Vijaya Mehta (Pestonjee) and Prakash Jha (Hip Hip Hurray).

Bhatia has scored television shows such as the medical drama Lifeline, Khandaan, Yatra, Wagle Ki Duniya, Banegi Apni Baat and the 53-episode Bharat Ek Khoj based on Jawaharlal Nehru's The Discovery of India, as well as numerous documentaries. He has also released albums of spiritual music on the Music Today label, and composed music for trade fairs such as Expo '70, Osaka and Asia 1972, New Delhi.

Bhatia is the best-known composer of Western classical music in India. His most frequently performed works are the Fantasia and Fugue in C for piano, the Sinfonia Concertante for strings, and the song cycle Six Seasons. His Reverie was performed by Yo-Yo Ma at a concert in Mumbai in January 2019, and the first two acts of his opera Agni Varsha, based on Girish Karnad's play of the same name, premiered in New York City in 2012 in a production by soprano Judith Kellock.

=== Death ===
Bhatia died on 7 May 2021, at his home in Mumbai, due to old age.

== List of compositions ==
=== Music for solo piano ===
- Toccata No. 1 in Raag Bahar (c. 1950s)
- Sonata (1952)
- Introduction and Retrograde (1959)
- Fantasia and Fugue in C (1999)
- Rhapsody on "Agni Varsha" (2007)
- Gujarati Nursery (2010)

=== Chamber music ===
- Trio for clarinet, cello and piano (c. 1950s)
- Quintet for flute, harp, viola and two cellos (c. 1950s)
- Divertimento for bassoon and piano (1951)
- Sonata for violin and piano (1954)
- Indian Nursery: Pieces for piano four hands (1956)
- Sonatina for violin and piano (1956)
- Divertimento Pastoral for flute, oboe, two clarinets and bassoon (1957)
- Sangeet Raat: Night Music for solo flute (1964)
- Cyclic Variations for cello and harpsichord (1965)
- Kaleidoscope for prepared piano and string quartet (1965)
- Kaleidoscope for violin, viola, cello and piano (2002)
- Reverie for cello and piano (2014)
- Spring: An Awakening for string quartet (2018)

=== Vocal music ===
- Dhoon for voice and piano (c. 1950s)
- Kinguri-Vali for soprano, violin and piano (1960)
- Rudranaam for triple chorus (1973)
- Jaisalmer for unaccompanied chorus (1977)
- Vasansi Jeernani for triple chorus (1981)
- Six Seasons for unaccompanied chorus (1989)
- Tantra: Meditations for voice and piano (1994)
- Transcendence for double chorus (2002)
- Rig Veda Hymns for double chorus (2003)
- Six Seasons for soprano and piano (2009)

=== Music for large ensemble ===
- Gita Govinda for orchestra (1954)
- Concerto in One Movement for piano and strings (1955)
- Sinfonia Concertante for strings (2001)

=== Opera ===
- Agni Varsha (2017)

=== Feature film scores ===
- The Householder (1963) – background score only
- Ankur (1974)
- Nishant (1975)
- Ek Dal Mithi (c. 1976, unreleased)
- Manthan (1976)
- Bhumika (1977)
- Anugraham/Kondura (1978)
- Junoon (1979)
- 36 Chowringhee Lane (1981)
- Kalyug (1981)
- Sazaye Maut (1981)
- Je Peed Parai Jaane Re (1982)
- Jaane Bhi Do Yaaro (1983)
- Mandi (1983)
- Hip Hip Hurray (1984)
- Mohan Joshi Haazir Ho! (1984)
- Tarang (1984)
- Aghaat (1985) – song only
- Khamosh (1985)
- Massey Sahib (1985) – uncredited
- Surkhiyaan (1985)
- Trikaal (1985)
- Mazhab (1986, released 1996)
- Mohre (1987)
- Pestonjee (1987)
- Susman (1987)
- Percy (1989)
- Ajooba (1991) – background score only
- Antarnaad (1991)
- Jazeere (1991)
- Kasba (1991)
- Pita (1991)
- Bekhudi (1992) – background score only
- Beta (1992) – background score only
- Chamatkar (1992) – background score only
- Ramayana: The Legend of Prince Rama (1992)
- Suraj Ka Satvan Ghoda (1992)
- Damini (1993) – background score only
- Sardar (1993)
- Droh Kaal (1994)
- Mammo (1994)
- Bangarwadi (1995)
- Naseem (1995)
- Bandish (1996) – background score only
- Ghatak (1996) – background score only
- Katha Doan Ganpatraonchi (1996) – background score only
- Sardari Begum (1996)
- The Making of the Mahatma (1996)
- Jaya Ganga (1996)
- Char Adhyay (1997)
- Himalay Putra (1997) – background score only
- Pardes (1997) – background score only
- China Gate (1998) – background score only
- Samar (1999)
- Dhaad (2000, released 2018)
- Hari-Bhari (2000)
- Chameli (2003) – background score only
- Escape from Taliban (2003) – background score only
- Rules: Pyaar Ka Superhit Formula (2003) – background score only
- Kahan Se Aaye Badarwa: Forgotten Showers (2005), re-released as Bhagya Na Jaane Koi (2017) – background score only
- Halla Bol (2008) – only one song

=== Television scores ===
- Khandaan (1985)
- Katha Sagar (1986) – selected episodes
- Yatra (1986)
- Tamas (1987)
- Bharat Ek Khoj (1988)
- Naqab (1988)
- Wagle Ki Duniya (1988)
- Lifeline (1991)
- Baingan Raja (c. 1990s)
- Bible Ki Kahaniyan (1993) – selected episodes
- Banegi Apni Baat (1994)
- Sankranti (1997)

=== Documentary scores (selected) ===
- A Certain Childhood (1962)
- To Light a Candle (1964)
- Kailash at Ellora (1965)
- A City in History (1966)
- From Lagoon to Sea (1966)
- The House That Ananda Built (1967)
- An Area of Darkness (c. 1968)
- Indian Youth: An Exploration (1968)
- Water (1968)
- Creative Artists: Amrita Sher-Gil (1969)
- 1002 A.D. Khajuraho (1973)
- Asia '72 (1974)
- Sarojini Naidu (1975)
- The Women of India (1975)
- A Small Family (1976)
- Nirnaya (1979)
- Touch (1979)
- Bombay: A City at Stake (1981)
- Shaping a Future (1983)
- Tata Steel: Seventy-Five Years of the Indian Steel Industry (1983)
- Nehru (1984) – certain sections scored by Alexei Kozlov
- Molly's Wish (1985)
- Chocolate Story (1986)
- Nature Symphony (1990)
- The Love We Give for Nothing (1992)
- Prabhupada: A Lifetime in Preparation (1996)
- Purva Uttara: Past Forward (1997)

=== Theatre music ===
- Teen Takke Ka Swang (1970), directed by Ebrahim Alkazi and Fritz Bennewitz
- A Man's a Man (1971), directed by Amal Allana
- The Caucasian Chalk Circle (1972), directed by Ebrahim Alkazi and Fritz Bennewitz
- Nisheeth (1972), directed by Shanta Gandhi
- Tughlaq (1972), directed by Ebrahim Alkazi
- Andha Yug (1974), directed by Ebrahim Alkazi
- Son-et-Lumiere: The Nehru Memorial Museum and Library (1976), directed by Ebrahim Alkazi
- Aurat Bhali Ramkali (1984), directed by Amal Allana
- Othello (1991), directed by Alyque Padamsee
- Cyrano de Bergerac (1995), directed by Jatinder Verma
- My Bollywood Summer (2005), directed by Sabera Shaik

=== Albums ===
- Preeti Sagar – "Spring Is Coming"/”All Night and Day" (1976)
- Hi! Ho! (1986)
- Music for Meditation (1993)
- Cinema Cinema (1995) – only one song
- The Elements: Earth (1995)
- The Bhagavad Gita, Vols. 1 & 2 (1996)
- Anant: The Endless (2001), re-released as The Spirit of the Upanishads (2007)
- Ritika Sahni – Ritika (2001)
- India Unlimited: The United World of Artistes (2000), re-released as Vaishnava Jana To (2005) – only one song
- Tiranga Tera Aanchal (2005)

== Awards ==
- Lili Boulanger Memorial Fund (1957)
- Bengal Film Journalists Association Award for Music: Manthan (1976), Bhumika (1977)
- Sur Singar Samsad Award for Best Classical Score/Song (1986, 1987)
- National Film Award for Best Music Direction for Tamas (1988)
- Sangeet Natak Akademi Award for Creative and Experimental Music (1989)
- Maharashtra Rajya Puraskar (1990)
- Padma Shri (2012)
