= Kasba (film) =

- Directed by: Kumar Shahani
- Written by: Kumar Shahani; Fareeda Mehta
- Based on: In the Ravine by Anton Chekhov
- Starring: Navjot Hansra; M. K. Raina; Manohar Singh; Shatrughan Sinha; Mita Vashisht; Raghubir Yadav
- Cinematography: K. K. Mahajan
- Music by: Vanraj Bhatia
- Distributed by: National Film Development Corporation (NFDC)
- Release date: 1991
- Running time: 121 minutes
- Country: India
- Language: Hindi

Kasba (English: The Town) is a 1991 Indian drama film written and directed by Kumar Shahani. It is based on the short story "In the Ravine" by the Russian playwright Anton Chekhov. The movie is an important work in the Indian Parallel Cinema movement which started in the early 1970s. It is one of the last films to be part of the movement as it died out by the early 1990s.

== Plot ==
The story centers on a small town entrepreneur named Maniram who makes a major profit by cheating people and selling them tainted food. His business is run by his daughter-in-law, Tejo, who is married to Maniram's mentally challenged younger son. Things go awry when Maniram's elder son comes back into town to get married. He runs away from his wife after their marriage night and ends up being arrested in Delhi. The police, with further investigation, start to crack down on Maniram's corrupt business, and all the while Tejo starts to become mad with power and greed.

== Awards and criticism ==
Kasba is the third of Kumar Shahani's films to win the Filmfare Award for Best Film (Critics) after Maya Darpan and Khayal Gatha.

Kasba is described as being slow and uncharacteristically melodramatic for a Shahani film, but it has gotten acclaim from a majority of critics. The film blog Ellipsis gave a positive review of the film saying, "One of the most impressive aesthetic elements of Kasba is the positioning of the camera, moving only to parallel the psychological and emotional mood of the characters, whilst windows and doorways are used repeatedly throughout to frame the actions of characters so that the exterior landscapes merge seamlessly with the interiors creating a feeling of social inertia and even rural decadence. At times, Shahani's emphasis on the rituals and traditions tied up in the history of the family recalls a philosophical approach characteristic of anthropologists."
