= Tarang (film) =

Tarang तरंग
- Directed by: Kumar Shahani
- Written by: Kumar Shahani; Roshan Shahani
- Starring: Amol Palekar; Smita Patil; Shreeram Lagoo; Om Puri; Girish Karnad
- Cinematography: K. K. Mahajan
- Edited by: Ashok Tyagi
- Music by: Vanraj Bhatia
- Distributed by: National Film Development Corporation (NFDC)
- Release date: 1984
- Running time: 171 minutes
- Country: India
- Language: Hindi

Tarang (Hindi: तरंग "wave") English title Wages and Profits, is a 1984 Indian Hindi-language drama film written and directed by Kumar Shahani. The film is Shahani's second feature film after his most famous work, Maya Darpan, and took him more than 12 years to raise funding for. The movie is considered, along with Shahani's other features, to be a seminal work of India's Parallel Cinema movement. The movie stars several big actors who were prominent in the Indian art cinema scene of the early '80s, including Amol Palekar, Smita Patil, Girish Karnad, Om Puri, and Shreeram Lagoo.

== Synopsis ==
Sethji (Shreeram Lagoo) is a widowed businessman who lives a comfortable life with his only daughter, Hansa, his son-in-law, Rahul (Amol Palekar), and a grandson, Munna. Rahul is Sethji's right-hand man, and his nephew Dinesh (Girish Karnad) is his assistant. Over time, petty rivalries and jealousies have grown in the family, and Sethji and Rahul feel that Dinesh is trying to undermine the business. They make a plan to get rid of him without attracting any attention to themselves and succeed, but the after-effects are not kind towards Sethji's health, which grows worse eventually leading to his untimely death. Shortly thereafter, Hansa also dies, leaving her husband Rahul to look after the business on his own. Things start to turn controversial once Rahul begins an affair with the maidservant Janki (Smita Patil), and it is soon revealed that Hansa's death may not have been a suicide, but was a cover-up. As the mysteries start to unfold, they leave a scarring emotional impact on Rahul, and test his relationship with his late wife's family and his new lover.

== Cast ==
- Shreeram Lagoo as Sethji - The wealthy aging head of the family
- Smita Patil as Janki - The maidservant
- Amol Palekar as Rahul - The calculating, opportunistic son-in-law
- Girish Karnad as Dinesh - The unscrupulous nephew of Sethji
- Om Puri as Namdev - The trade union leader
- Rohini Hattangadi as Anita - Rahul's corporate secretary
- Kawal Gandhiok as Hansa – Sethji's fragile daughter and Rahul's wife
- M. K. Raina as Abdul - A working-class figure close to Janki's community
- Sulabha Deshpande as Khala-jaan - Abdul's aunt
- Jalal Agha as Russi

== Music ==
Music is composed by Vanraj Bhatia with lyrics by Raghuveer Sahay.

- "Barse Ghan Saari Raat" - Lata Mangeshkar
- "Tarang Tarang" - Asha Bhosle

== Analysis and criticism ==
Unlike Maya Darpan, Tarang is considered to be uncharacteristically traditional and conventional for a Kumar Shahani film. Its storyline follows a typical arch, and the film also features several song sequences, considered normal for mainstream Bollywood films, but very abnormal for an independent parallel cinema film. In an interview on the film, Shahani stated his approach was to "take into account the way our traditions are surviving in popular art. Both folk and popular art always have epic elements. Even pulp literature is a distortion of the epic form."

The Seventh Art film blog reviewed the film positively stating, "A staunch Marxist, Shahani examines the class struggle on multiple fronts: in the writing that nearly recites the labour theory of value, in the densely layered soundtrack where various voices vie for power and the casting, where the star value of the actors is in conflict with the characters they play."

Film blog The Case for Global Film, in a piece of Indian Parallel Cinema stated that "Kumar Shahni felt while making Tarang, It is a pity that societies tend to make museum pieces of art when, in fact, the need for it is as natural and as instinctive in people as eating and drinking. That is probably why Tarang comes through to the discerning viewer as a moving experience, even if he is completely unaware of the intricacies of Shahani’s personal imagination."
