= Nirmal Verma =

Indian writer (1929–2005)

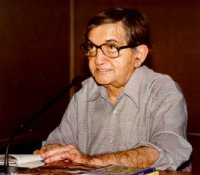
- Born: 3 April 1929; Shimla, Punjab, British India
- Died: 25 October 2005 (aged 76); New Delhi, India
- Occupations: Novelist, writer, activist, translator
- Writing career
- Notable awards: Sahitya Akademi Award (1985); Jnanpith Award (1999); Padma Bhushan (2002); Sahitya Akademi Fellowship (2004)

Nirmal Verma (3 April 1929 – 25 October 2005) was an Indian Hindi-language novelist, short-story writer, essayist, literary critic, activist and translator. He was one of the pioneers of the Nayi Kahani (New Story) movement in post-independence Hindi literature, wherein his first collection of stories, Parinde (Birds, 1959) is considered its first signature.

In his career spanning five decades and various forms of literature, writing story, travelogues and essays, he penned five novels, eight short-story collections and nine books of non-fiction, including essays and travelogues. He was awarded the Sahitya Akademi Award in 1985 for the short-story collection Kavve aur Kala Pani, the Jnanpith Award for 1999, the Padma Bhushan and the Sahitya Akademi Fellowship in 2004.

== Early life and education ==
Nirmal Verma was born on 3 April 1929 in Shimla, where his father, Nand Kumar Verma was a senior official in the Defence Department of the British Indian government. He was the seventh child among his eight siblings. One of his brothers Ram Kumar became a prominent Indian modernist painter.

He subsequently moved to Delhi and completed M.A. in History from St. Stephen's College, Delhi University. One of his earliest published stories appeared in a student magazine in the early 1950s.

His activism streak was visible even during his student days; in 1947–48, he regularly attended Mahatma Gandhiji's morning prayer meetings in Delhi, even though he was a card holding member of Communist Party of India, which he resigned in 1956, after Soviet invasion of Hungary. The very activism was soon to be reflected in his stories, which added a whole new dimension to the Indian literary scene.Thereafter he started teaching in Delhi and writing for various literary magazines. His short-story collection Parinde was publlished in 1959, which established him in the emerging Nayi Kahani movement in Hindi literature.

== Career ==
"For a writer to desire spiritual security is as fatal as an aspiration to material pleasure. For a writer, every place of refuge is a pitfall; you fall once, and the clear sky of creativity is lost forever."
- Dhund se Uthati Dhun

He stayed in Prague for 10 years, where he was invited by Oriental Institute to initiate a program of translation of modern Czech writers like Karel Čapek, Milan Kundera or Bohumil Hrabal to Hindi; he also learnt Czech language, and translated nine world classics to Hindi, before returning home in 1968, as the result of Warsaw Pact invasion of Czechoslovakia.

During his stay in Prague he travelled widely across Europe, and the result was seven travelogues, including Cheeron Par Chandni (1962), Har Barish Mein (1970) and Dhund Se Uthti Dhun and his first novel, based on his student days in Prague, titled, Ve Din (Those Days) (1964). On his return from Prague, he was disillusioned by communism and later became highly vocal against Indian Emergency, and an advocate for the Tibetan independence movement. His subsequent writing reflected his concerted relooking of Indian traditions, which he found to be innately modern, compared with external modernity reflected in the western viewpoints and cultural milieu, which were being imposed on Indian ethos, all around, so much so that later his views were confused as pro-Hindutva as well. A critical analysis of Verma's work was presented by Ram Prakash Dwivedi

From 1980–83, Verma served as chairman of Nirala creative writing chair in Bharat Bhavan, Bhopal. In 1988–90 he was director of Yashpal Creative Writing Chair in Shimla. A film based on his story, Maya Darpan (1972), directed by Kumar Shahani, won the Filmfare Critics Award for Best Film.

In his popular novel A Torn Happiness, August Strindberg looms large over the heads of many characters.

He died on 25 October 2005 in New Delhi. He is survived by his wife, Gagan Gill who is a writer.

== Awards and milestones ==
- Jnanpith Award in 1999, the highest literary award for Indian writers.
- 'Kavve aur Kala Pani', A collection of seven short stories, won the Sahitya Akademi Award in 1985.
- Padma Bhushan in 2002.
- Jnanapith Trust's "Murtidevi Award" for his book of essays, Bharat Aur Europe: Pratishruti Ke Kshetra (1991).
- Jury member Lettre Ulysses Award for the art of Reportage −2003.
- He was a fellow with the International Institute for Asian Studies.
- Library of Congress catalogues most of the works of Nirmal Verma in its collection.
- India's highest literary award, for lifetime achievement, the Sahitya Akademi Fellowship in 2005.
- On the publication of his book, "The World Elsewhere", in 1988, by the Readers International in London, BBC Channel Four telecasted a film on his life and works.
- Chevalier de l'ordre des arts et des lettres (France) 2005

== Nayi Kahani movement ==
Nirmal Verma, together with Mohan Rakesh, Bhisham Sahni, Kamleshwar, Amarkant, Rajendra Yadav and others, is the founder of the Nai Kahani (new short story) in Hindi literature.

Nirmal Verma is best known for his short stories and his best known story, 'Parinde' (Birds) (1959) is supposed to be the pioneer of the Nai Kahani Movement in Hindi literature. Nirmal Verma's other notable stories are Andhere Mein, Dedh Inch Upar, and Kavve Aur Kala Pani. Nirmal Verma's last story was published in "Naya Gyanodaya" August 2005 issue, titled "Ab Kuchh Nahin".

Nirmal Verma experimented vividly with theme as well as technique of the Hindi short story in the 60s and 70s.

A collection of his letters written to Ramkumar (well known artist and his brother) has been published by Bhartiya Jnanpith, titled "Priya Ram" (Dear Ram). His books have been translated into several European languages such as English, Russian, German, Icelandic, Polish, Italian and French.

== Major works ==
Novels

- Ve Din – His first novel, set in Prague, former Czechoslovakia (1964),
- Antima Aranya (The Last Wilderness)
- Ek Chithara Sukh (1979)
- Lal Teen Ki Chhat (Red Tin Roof), (1974)
- Raat ka Reporter (1989)

Story anthologies

- 'Parinde' (Birds) (1959)
- Jalti Jhari (1965)
- London ki raat
- Pichli Garmiyon Mein (1968)
- Akala tripathi
- Dedh Inch Upar
- Beech Bahas Mein (1973)
- Meri Priya Kahaniyan (1973)
- Pratinidhi Kahaniyan (1988)
- Kavve aur Kala Pani (1983)
- Sookha aur Anya Kahaniyan (1995).
- Dhage (2003)

Reportage and travelogues

- Cheeron Par Chandni (1962)
- Har Barish Mein (1989)(In Every Rain)

Plays

- Teen Ekant (1976)

Essays and literary criticism

- Shabda aur Smriti (1976) – Literary essay
- Kala Ka Jokhima (1981) – investigation of the Indic arts in the 20th century
- Dhundha Se Uthati Dhun – written like a diary on issues related to Hindi literature. – Literary criticism
- Dhalan se Utarate Huye – Literary criticism
- Bharat Aur Europe: Pratishruti Ke Kshetra (1991) – Essay.

== See also ==
- List of Indian writers
