= In the Ravine =

1900 novella by Anton Chekhov

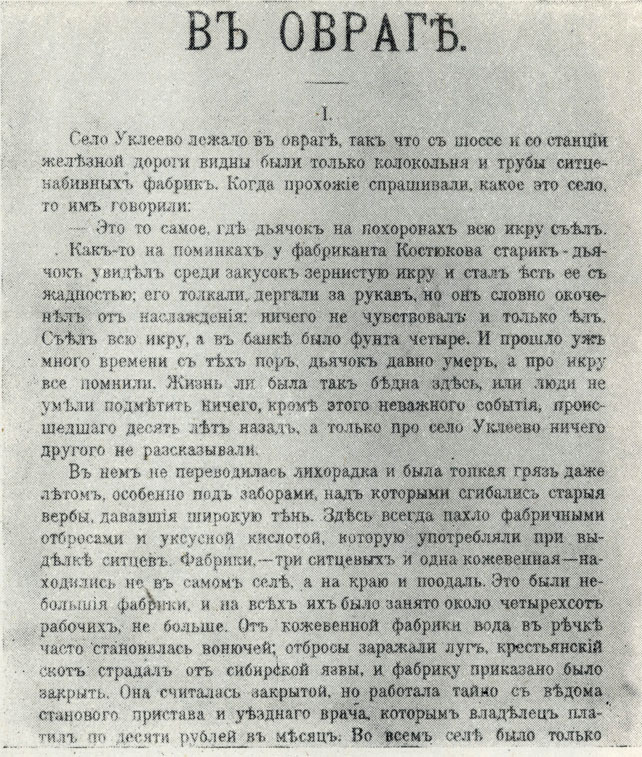
- First Russian edition
- Author: Anton Chekhov
- Original title: В овраге
- Language: Russian
- Published in: Zhizn
- Publisher: Adolf Marks
- Publication date: January 1900
- Publication place: Russia

In the Ravine (Russian: В овраге, romanized: V ovrage) is a 1900 novella by Anton Chekhov first published in the No.1, January issue of Zhizn magazine.

== Characters ==
- Grigory Petrovich Tsybukin, an ageing village merchant. Dislikes the village peasants and cheats them.
- Anisim Grigoryevich Tsybukin, Grigory Petrovich's elder son. Works in the criminal investigation department in the city and likes to boast about his uncanny ability to see through all kinds of crookedness.
- Stepan Grigoryevich Tsybukin, the younger son. Supposed to help his father but his frailty and deafness make him useless.
- Aksinya, Stepan's wife. A great beauty as well as a flirt, with nice, 'naive' smile, yet something “snake-like”. Bustling and energetic, she takes an interest in the family business.
- Varvara Nikolayevna, Grigory Petrovich's second wife. A pious person who likes to make fruit jams and help the poor.
- Lipa, Anisim's wife. Trusting and childlike. Comes from a very poor family and is totally subservient to her fate.
- Elizarov, nicknamed “Crutch”, a carpenter, an old and wise man.

== Plot summary ==
Grigory Tsybukin decides to marry his elder son, Anisim. The latter receives the news calmly, but without enthusiasm. His bride Lipa is a poor girl, so joining the Tsybukin family might be seen as a gift of fate, for somebody without a dowry. Anisim arrives three days before the wedding and, as a gift, hands out silver rubles, which look brand new. At his own wedding, Anisov quickly gets drunk. He is privately stricken by an awareness of his sins, too numerous to forgive, though he prays anyway. He brags about a friend he has in the city, Samorodov, whom he refers to as "a special person." Not long before heading back to the city, Anisim makes hints about some kind of murky business Samorodov has involved him in. "I will either get rich or perish," he says.

On the day of Anisim's departure, Varvara Nikolayevna attempts to put it to him, that while their family is rich, its life is quite horrible, for what they do, is cheat the people in every conceivable way, and are being hated by them. She mentions God, but Anisim is unimpressed. He, the man who claims to have the gift of 'seeing through people,' has never in his life met a true believer. At the station Tsybukin the elder asks his son to stay at home, promising to "shower him with gold", but the latter says no: he seems to truly enjoy his job in the city, which involves uncovering all sorts of crookery and deception. In fact, even during his short stay in the village, he has inadvertently succeeded in solving two cases of petty theft.

Soon after Anisim is gone, it transpires that the silver rubles that he had brought with him, are fake. The news arrives that he and a crook named Samorodov are charged with forgery. Tsybukin is shocked and frightened. He tells Aksinya to collect all the fake rubles and throw them into the well. Instead, she passes them along to the mowers harvesting the family’s grain.

1938 illustration by Vladimir Konashevich

Anisim is jailed, and later sentenced to six years of hard labor in Siberia, despite his father's efforts to provide him with good defense in court. What the latter does, though, is visit a lawyer in the city and makes a will, bequeathing all the family's property to Nikifor, the newly born Lipa's son. This includes the brick factory that Aksinya had built in partnership with the local merchants, Khrymov brothers, on a plot of Tsybukin's land. Aksinya is outraged with the will. She makes a huge row, then rushes into the house, where Lipa makes some washing, grabs a bucket and pours boiling water upon the child. Next day Nikifor dies in the hospital, and Lipa sheepishly carries the corpse back home.

The old Tsybukin is horrified, but he is too scared now of Aksinya. "And he was a pretty child... Oh, dear, dear.... You only had the one child, and you did not take care enough of him, you silly girl," is all that he can bring himself to tell the grief-stricken young mother. Aksinya orders Lipa out of the house. The day after the funeral the girl silently returns to her mother's home.

Three years pass. Formally Grigory Petrovich is still the head of the family, but it's Aksinya who runs everything at home, at the brick factory and at the station tavern, she's recently built with her friends Khrymins. Varvara still makes loads of jam and enjoys helping the poor. The last time Lipa and her mother see the old Tsybukin, he sits listlessly by the church, while a couple of men beside him argue about whether Aksinya, no matter how respected a figure she is in the village, has any right at all to deny food to her father-in-law, who hasn't eaten now for three days.

== Background and publication ==
Since 1898, Maxim Gorky, one of Chekhov's great admirers, had been making attempts at drawing him closer to the magazine Zhizn which he himself was closely associated with. "In the Ravine" was written for it, by way of a response to the editor-in-chief Vladimir Posse's numerous requests.

Chekhov first mentioned working upon the novella in his 14 November 1899 letter to his sister Maria. On 19 November he informed Posse: "This large novella for Zhizn is in the pipelines, it will be ready perhaps in the second half of December. [...] A horde of characters is in there, lots of hustle and bustle so one has to work hard so as to make this overcrowdedness not that obvious."

On 26 December, writing to Mikhail Menshikov, Chekhov described "In the Ravine" as "a story about the factory life, and of how sour it is." In his 21 January 1900 letter to Grigory Rossolimo he called it "my final novella concerning the village folk's life."

On November the 20th the story was sent to the magazine by its author. "In the Ravine"' was first published in Zhizn's No.1, January 1900 issue. Chekhov was outraged with the quality of proofreading and in an 11 January letter to Posse described it "as an orgy of typographic sloppiness." After editing the original text, Chekhov included the story into Volume 12 of the 1903, second edition of his Collected Works, published by Adolf Marks. It was then reproduced in Volume 11 of the posthumous, 1906 third edition.

According to Mikhail Chekhov's memoirs, the story was based upon "the real life accident that happened while he was on Sakhalin; as for the setting, it is some place nearby Melikhovo."

The Yalta teacher and writer S.N. Shchukin in his memoirs quoted Chekhov as once having told him: "I depict the people's life in the Central Russian gubernias, for I know it best. The merchants Khrymins are out there, they are real, their only difference [from my characters] is, they are worse. Their children start drinking vodka from the age of eight, become sexually corrupt in childhood and spread syphilis all through the neighbourhood. ...And there is nothing exceptional about this incident, when Lipa's boy gets murdered by the boiling water, the zemsky doctors come across cases like this quite often. "

Ivan Bunin recalled that he once told Chekhov how a local deacon had eaten two pounds of caviar at his father's birthday. "That was what he started his novella In the Ravine," Bunin added.

== Critical reception ==
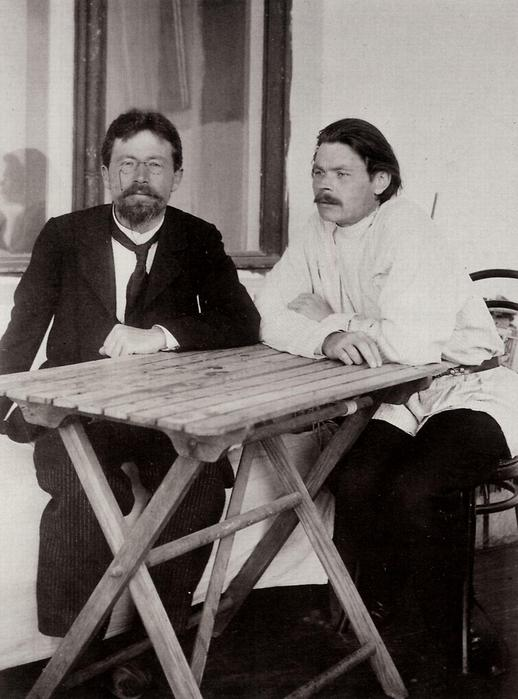
Chekhov and Gorky in Yalta. 1900

Like Peasants before it, In the Ravine provoked extensive and heated discussion in the Russian press. Some criticized the author for his exceedingly pessimistic outlook, others lauded the story's uncompromising, straightforward message. On 28 December Vladimir Posse wrote to the author: "What a merciless, cruel revelation. Nothing theatrical, but the effect is immense, all-pervading and continues to grow long after the story novella had been read."

Chekhov received numerous highly emotional letters from his followers, one of whom, Viktor Mirolyubov, the then editor of Zhurnal Dlya Vsekh, wrote on 9 February: "Three times I had to stop reading. You know the feeling, when eyes are swelled with tears and something fills the chest as if you are sent flying. [...] It is not your gift that matters, but your heart, your deep feeling... towards all things suffering, for those who perish due to their ignorance, which is so common to this huge ghetto of our life, where only animal instincts win out."

Dmitry Ovsyaniko-Kulikovsky considered the story to be the portrayal of the evil that the emergence of the new rural bourgeoisie has brought to life. V.P. Albov considered "In the Ravine" to be the author's best story in terms of "depth and subtlety of the plot," as well as "the manifestation of a new philosophy, which Chekhov has discovered for himself." A.F. Koni in a November 1900 letter called In the Ravine a gem of the Russian literature.

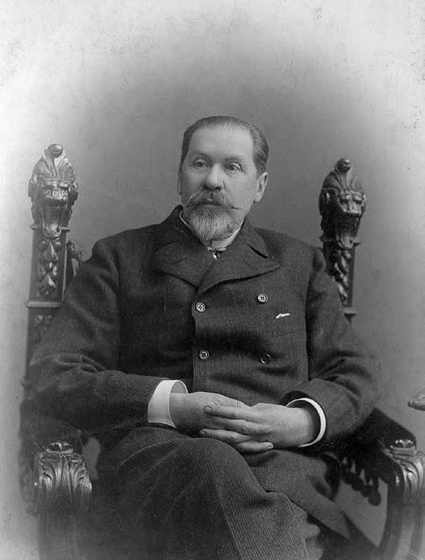
Viktor Burenin considered Aksinya and Anisim to be the covert Marxists

In February 1900 Maxim Gorky wrote Chekhov to inform him of how strong was the effect the story had made upon Leo Tolstoy, as well as a group of the Poltava region peasants he himself had read it to. "You are indeed a wonderful man, Anton Pavlovich, and a huge talent!" he added.

Gorky published a review in Nizhegorodsky Vestnik (Nizhny Novgorod Herald) in which he praised Chekhov as not just a writer of huge talent, but also a hugely influential figure in the context of Russian social and political life. Arguing with the opponents who had accused Chekhov of being indifferent towards his characters and having no ideas of his own, he wrote: "Chekhov has his own worldview, but also something much more than that. He has developed his own vision of life... which he portrays in all of its chaos, with all of its absurdities... from this high vantage point of his own. [...] His new story is tragic and horribly dark, but a [note of hope] sounds stronger than ever and awakens in us a spark of joy."

Among those who came up with negative reviews, was Chekhov's major detractor Viktor Burenin. Writing for Novoye Vremya, a newspaper owned by Chekhov's good friend Alexey Suvorin, he constructed his own, apparently facetious theory, according to which the novella's two major characters, Anisim and Aksinya, were the covert Marxists. Mikhail Menshikov concentrated on the story's female characters and divided them into three categories: destructive (Aksinya), constructive (Lipa) and conservative (Varvara). Menshikov's idea was that the rise of capitalism in rural Russia was but a passing fad and he thought Chekhov's attitude towards it to be too serious.

Several critics, among them Alexander Skabichevsky, Rostislav Sementkovsky and Alexander Izmaylov while crediting the author with having created a great piece of literature, still complained about what they saw as the novella's utter pessimism, with "notes of complete misery reaching the unbearable crescendo," according to Skabichevsky.

== Film versions ==
- Kasba, a 1991 Indian adaptation directed by Kumar Shahani
- Господи,_прости_нас_грешных (Lord, Forgive Us Sinners), a 1992 Ukrainian adaptation
- Колечко золотое, букет из алых роз (Golden Ring, Bouquet of Scarlet Roses), a 1994 Russian adaptation
