= Char Adhyay =

- Directed by: Kumar Shahani
- Written by: Kumar Shahani; Udayan Vajpeyi (dialogue)
- Based on: Char Adhyay (1934) by Rabindranath Tagore
- Produced by: National Film Development Corporation of India (NFDC); Doordarshan
- Cinematography: K. K. Mahajan
- Edited by: Sujata Narula
- Music by: Vanraj Bhatia
- Release date: 1997
- Running time: 110 min
- Country: India
- Language: Hindi

Char Adhyay (English: Four Chapters) 1997 Indian Hindi language drama film written and directed by Kumar Shahani. It is based on Rabindranath Tagore's last novel by the same name, written in 1934.

The film is set in the late Bengali Renaissance of the 1930s and 1940s, and a group of young intellectuals and revolutionaries involved with the Indian independence movement. It deals with the impact of political issues on personal lives and questions blind nationalism and blind adherence to a leader and delves into the ugly face of idealism.

Most of the cast included non-actors, Nandini Ghosal was an Odissi dancer a disciple of Guru Kelucharan Mahapatra, Kaushik Gopal was a psychoanalyst, while Sumanto Chattopadhyay worked in advertising and acted in theatre.

== Cast ==
- Sumanto Chattopadhyay as Atindra
- Nandini Ghosal as Ela
- Kaushik Gopal as Indranath
- Shiboprosad Mukherjee
- Shruti Yusufi
- Rajat Kapoor
- Ramchandra Parihar
