= Sthithi =

- Directed by: R. Sarath
- Written by: R. Sarath
- Produced by: T. P. Abdul Khader
- Starring: Unni Menon; Nandini Ghosal; Master Achuth; Master Anand Pillay; Mallika Sukumaran
- Cinematography: M. J. Radhakrishnan
- Edited by: Beena Paul
- Music by: Unni Menon; M. Jayachandran; Sunny Viswanath
- Production company: Sak Films
- Release date: 17 January 2003
- Country: India
- Language: Malayalam

Sthithi (English: Plight) is a 2003 Malayalam feature film written and directed by R. Sarath. The film tells the tale of a couple employed in the Secretariat. It stars Unni Menon, Nandini Ghosal, Master Achuth, Master Anand Pillay and Mallika Sukumaran. It is playback singer Unni Menon's debut film as an actor. He also composed a couple of songs for the film. Bengali actress and Odissi dancer, Nandini Ghosal plays the female lead. Master Anand Pillay who played the role of their son, hails from Thiruvananthapuram, and is a famous quizzer and quizmaster who had participated in the TV show Kuttikalodano Kali

== Cast ==
- Unni Menon as Vivek
- Nandini Ghosal as Vani (Voice By Praveena)
- Master Achuth as Raman
- Master Anand Pillay as Vishwam
- Mallika Sukumaran as Sakundala nair
- C. K. Babu as Pattom Syleshwaran
- Vellayambalam Gopalakrishnan as Narayana Pillai
- Sreelatha as Mary
- Remya Nambeesan as Remya
- Vinu Abraham as Sajan
- Kollam Devarajan as PT teacher
- Ratna Purushothaman as Devaki
- Jayaraj Warrier as Devan
- Sandhya Rajendran as Devi
- Leena Nair as Anamika

== Soundtrack ==
Music: M. Jayachandran, Unni Menon, Sunny Viswanath
Lyrics: Prabha Varma, Priya Viswanath

- "Oru Chembaneer" - Unni Menon
- "Odalenna" - Sujatha Mohan
- "Let's Wipe The Tears" - Gayatri Asokan, Maya Karta
