= N. Viswanathan =

Indian actor and academic

N.Viswanathan
- Born: Narayanswamy Viswanathan; 18 July 1929; Vellore, Madras Presidency, British India (now Tamil Nadu, India)
- Died: 17 November 2010 (aged 81); Kolkata, West Bengal, India
- Years active: 1951–2010
- Spouse: Paramita
- Children: Ashoke Viswanathan

Narayanswamy Viswanathan (18 July 1929 – 17 November 2010), popularly known as Calcutta Viswanathan in the Tamil film industry, was an Indian actor and academic. A Tamilian by birth, he moved to Calcutta (now Kolkata) at a young age and taught English at St. Xavier's College, Calcutta for more than 40 years. Viswanathan was also a well-known public speaker. He made his acting debut in Mrinal Sen's Punascha and continued to act in Bengali films. In a career that spanned 40 years, Viswanathan appeared in nearly 100 films in Bengali, Tamil and English. He was a member several theatre groups and also formed the "Calcutta Players", an acting troupe.

== Biography ==
=== Early life ===
Born into a Tamil family in Vellore, Viswanathan moved to Kolkata, West Bengal at an early age. He was educated at St. Xavier's College, Kolkata and joined the same college as a professor in English. He had great command over English and Bengali languages, and was particularly well known for his British accent. Viswanthan was also a public speaker who participated in numerous debates and won accolades for India. He also has a short stint with Doordarshan, Kolkata.

=== Entry into films ===
While teaching at the college, he was offered a role in Punascha (1961), a Bengali film directed by Mrinal Sen. The film received a certificate of Merit for Third Best Feature Film in Bengali. Viswanathan then got a chance to act in another Bengali film titled Kanchenjungha (1962), directed by Satyajit Ray. The film had the distinction of being the first original screenplay and first colour film of Ray. Viswanathan received critical acclaim for his role in both the films. He became a favourite of Ray for his "urban [and] sophisticated image".

After the release of these two films, Viswanathan got numerous offers in Bengali, Tamil and English languages. He entered the Tamil film industry in the 1970s and acted in films such as Lalitha, Mogam Muppadhu Varusham and Moondru Mudichu, alongside prominent actors. Other Tamil films released during the period include Kavari Maan and Balu Mahendra's Moodu Pani, where he was cast in a prominent role.

Viswanathan was well known for his "pipe-smoking", a style which he adopted in most of the films.

=== Theatre group ===
Viswanathan was also a member of Utpal Dutt's "People's Little Theatre" (PLT), and later formed his own group named "Calcutta Players".

=== Death ===
Viswanathan had prolonged illness for a long time before his death. He died at the age of 81 at his "Sarat Bose" residence in Kolkata on 17 November 2010. He is survived by his wife Paramita, a son and a grand daughter. His son Ashoke Viswanathan is a film maker.

== Partial filmography ==
- Ratnadeep (1951)
- Punascha (1961)
- Kanchenjungha (1962) as Mr. Banerjee
- Barnali (1963)
- Subhashchandra(1966)
- Parichay (1972)
- Je Jekhane Dariye (1974)
- Moondru Mudichu (1976)
- Lalitha (1976)
- Mogam Muppadhu Varusham (1976)
- Kavarimaan (1979)
- Dour (1979)
- Moodu Pani (1980)
- Kann Sivanthaal Mann Sivakkum (1983)
- Vellai Roja (1983)
- Enakkul Oruvan (1984)
- Nilavu Suduvathillai (1984)
- Padikkadha Pannaiyar (1985)
- The Peacock Spring (1996)
- Aparajita (1998)
- Kichhhu Sanlap Kichhu Pralap (1999)
- Baba (2002)
- Andhakaer Shabdo (2006)
- Byaticromi (2006)
