= Rajat Kapoor =

Indian actor, film director (Born February 1961)

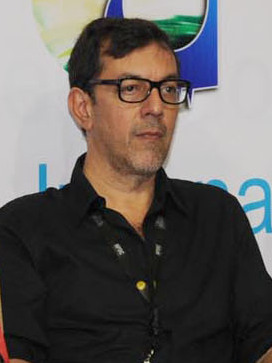
- Rajat Kapoor at the International Film Festival of India 2014
- Born: 11 February 1961 (age 65); New Delhi, India
- Occupations: Actor; filmmaker; playwright
- Years active: 1987–present
- Spouse: Meenal Agarwal (m. 1996)
- Children: 2

Rajat Kapoor is an Indian actor, filmmaker and playwright who works in Hindi cinema.

== Early life and career ==
Rajat Kapoor was born on 11 February 1961 in New Delhi, India and grew up in Old Delhi. In 1983 he joined the theatre group Chingari in Delhi. In 1985 he moved to Pune to attend the Film and Television Institute of India (FTII).

Kapoor started out in Parallel Cinema, making his debut in the 1989 Kumar Shahani film Khayal Gatha. When he had trouble finding acting jobs in the 1990s, Kapoor began writing and directing shorts. He made his full-length directorial debut with Private Detective: Two Plus Two Plus One (1997), which had Irrfan Khan and Naseeruddin Shah in minor roles.

=== Mainstream breakthrough and continued career ===
In 2001, Kapoor got his big mainstream break-in Dil Chahta Hai, as Preity Zinta's character's uncle. He received international attention in Mira Nair's Monsoon Wedding in which he played an abusive uncle. Since then, he has written, directed, and appeared in many films. He played Muhammad Ali Jinnah in a UK television film The Last Days of the Raj in 2007. In 2003, he wrote and directed the independent film Raghu Romeo, which he financed by sending e-mail requests for money to his friends. Although it was not a box office success, the film won the National Film Award for Best Feature Film in Hindi. He then directed and starred in Mixed Doubles, a film that deals with swinging in contemporary Mumbai. In 2008 he directed a sleeper hit Mithya. He was also nominated for Best Performance by an Actor for Siddharth: The Prisoner at the 2008 Asia Pacific Screen Awards. In the year 2010, he has also starred in a Bengali movie Iti Mrinalini opposite Konkona Sen directed by Bengali film writer Aparna Sen.

Apart from films, Kapoor hosts the tri-weekly chat show Lounge telecasted by NDTV Good Times. He also worked in television shows, including Rishtey which was aired on Zee TV in the episode "Milan". Tired of pitching his stories to investors, Kapoor reached out to his friend Chet Jainn, founder of the crowdfunding platform goCrowdera.com to raise initial seed fund for his next film called RkRkay. The "RkRkay" crowdfunding campaign went on to raise over ₹35,00,000.

Kapoor is a three time National Award winner, first for his 26-minute non-feature documentary, Tarana, then for his short, Hypnothesis, and after that for Raghu Romeo in Best Feature Film in Hindi section.

== Personal life ==
Kapoor married Meenal Agarwal, a photographer-production designer in 1996 and has two children, a daughter Rabia and a son Vivan. Kapoor is an atheist, and he has said he believes God is a man-made concept.

=== Allegations of sexual harassment ===
In October 2018, Kapoor was accused of sexual harassment by two different women during the Me Too movement. One, a journalist, said that he made inappropriate comments during a telephone interview. Following these accusations, Kapoor apologised on Twitter, saying "I am sorry from the bottom of my heart – and sad that I was the cause of this hurt to another human being." His film Kadakh was dropped from the 20th MAMI Film Festival due to the allegations.

== Filmography ==
Feature films
Year	Title	Functioned As					Notes
Year	Title	Director	Producer	Screenwriter	Actor	Role	Notes
1989	Khayal Gatha				Yes	Several characters	
1994	Tarana	Yes					National Film Award for Best Short Fiction Film
1996	Hypnothesis	Yes					National Film Award for Best Short Fiction Film
1997	Private Detective: Two Plus Two Plus One	Yes		Yes			
2001	Dil Chahta Hai				Yes	Mahesh	
2001	Monsoon Wedding				Yes	Tej Puri	
2003	Raghu Romeo	Yes		Yes			National Film Award for Best Feature Film in Hindi
2003	Mudda: The Issue				Yes	Harphool Singh	
2004	Tum				Yes	Vinod Gupta	
2005	Dhadkanein				Yes		
2005	Kisna: The Warrior Poet				Yes	Prince Raghuraj	
2005	Chehraa				Yes		
2006	Mixed Doubles	Yes		Yes	Yes	Vinod	
2006	Corporate				Yes	Vinay Sehgal	
2006	Yun Hota To Kya Hota				Yes	US Consulate Officer	
2006	Bombay Skies				Yes	Anand	Short film
2006	Anuranan				Yes	Amit Bannerjee	Simultaneously shot in Hindi and Bengali
2007	The Last Days of the Raj				Yes	Muhammad Ali Jinnah	TV film
2007	Bheja Fry				Yes	Ranjeet Thadani	
2007	Apna Asmaan				Yes	Dr. Sen	
2007	Hamlet: The Clown Prince	Yes					Play
2007	Khoya Khoya Chand				Yes	Prem Kumar	
2008	Mithya	Yes		Yes			
2008	Krazzy 4				Yes	Ravi K. Sanyal	
2008	Via Darjeeling				Yes	Ronodeep 'Rono' Sen	
2008	Jaane Tu... Ya Jaane Na				Yes	Mahesh Pariyar	
2008	Hulla				Yes	Janardhan	
2008	Dasvidaniya				Yes	Rajiv Jhulka	
2009	I M 24				Yes	Shubendu Roy	
2009	Ek Tho Chance				Yes		
2009	Siddharth: The Prisoner				Yes	Siddharth Roy	
2009	Teree Sang				Yes	Barrister Mohit Puri	
2009	Raat Gayi, Baat Gayi?		Yes	Yes	Yes	Rahul Kapoor	
2010	Rann				Yes	Naveen Shankalya	
2010	That Girl in Yellow Boots				Yes	Man Who Steps Out of Elevator	Premiered in South Asian International Film Festival 2010
2010	Pappu Can't Dance Saala				Yes	Palash	Premiered in South Asian International Film Festival 2010
2010	...And Once Again				Yes	Rishi	
2010	Iti Mrinalini				Yes	Siddhartha Sarkar	
2010	Phas Gaye Re Obama				Yes	Om Shastri	
2011	Jo Dooba So Paar: It's Love In Bihar!				Yes	Superintendent of Police	
2011	Nothing Like Lear	Yes					Play
2012	Agent Vinod				Yes	ISI chief Lt-Gen Iftekhar Ahmed	
2012	Fatso!	Yes	Yes				
2012	The Owner		Yes				
2012	10ml LOVE				Yes	Ghalib	
2012	Midnight's Children				Yes	Aadam Aziz	
2013	Carpet Boy				Yes	Ehsaan Khan	
2014	Ankhon Dekhi	Yes		Yes	Yes	Rishi	Won – Star Screen Award for Best Story; Won - Filmfare Award for Best Story; Won - Filmfare Award for Best Film (Critics)
2015	Drishyam				Yes	Mahesh Deshmukh	
2015	X: Past Is Present				Yes	K	
2016	Kapoor & Sons				Yes	Harsh Kapoor	Nominated - Filmfare Award for Best Supporting Actor
2016	Mantra				Yes	Kapil Kapoor	English-Hindi bilingual film
2017	Rat Race - Ek Andhi Daud				Yes	Akhil	Short film
2018	Pari				Yes	Professor Quasim Aali	
2018	Mulk				Yes	Danish Javed	
2020	Kadakh	Yes	Yes		Yes	Author Rahul	
2022	Gehraiyaan				Yes	Jitesh	
2022	RK/RKay	Yes		Yes	Yes	RK / Mahboob	
2022	Drishyam 2				Yes	Mahesh Deshmukh	
2023	Anur				Yes	IAS Loshit Modliar	Assamese film
2024	Sadabahar				Yes	Miya Ji's Son	
2025	Raid 2				Yes	Anjani Kaul IRS Chief Commissioner of Income Tax	
2025	Raat Akeli Hai: The Bansal Murders				Yes	DGP Sameer Verma	
2026	Everybody Loves Sohrab Handa	Yes	Yes	Yes	Yes	Chandra	
2026	Main Vaapas Aaunga				Yes	Iqbal Grewal	
2026	Lust Stories 3				Yes	Therapist	
2026	Drishyam: The Conclusion				Yes	Mahesh Deshmukh	

=== Television ===
Year	Title	Role	Language
1987–1988	Ganadevta		Hindi
1994-1998	Junoon	Pappu	Hindi
1999-2000	Gubbare	Sharad	Hindi
2000-2003	Gharwali Uparwali (one episode only)	Advertising Agency Boss	Hindi
2005	C.I.D (two episodes only)	Tanuj	Hindi
2008	Gateway To Hollywood	Judge	Hindi
2014-2015	Everest	Ramesh Rungta	Hindi
2017-2019	The Good Karma Hospital	Amit Nambeesan	English
2020	Code M	Col. Suryaveer Chauhan	Hindi
2020	Shobdo Jobdo	Sougata	Bengali
2020	Scam 1992	K. Madhavan	Hindi
2021	Call My Agent: Bollywood	Montie Bahl	Hindi
2022	Tanaav	Jagjit Malik	Hindi
2023	Jehanabad - Of Love & War	Shivanand Singh	Hindi
2024	Lootere	Captain A.K. Singh	Hindi
2025	Khauf	Hakim	Hindi
2025	Saare Jahan Se Accha: The Silent Guardians	R. N. Kao	Hindi
