= Nandini Ghosal =

Indian dancer

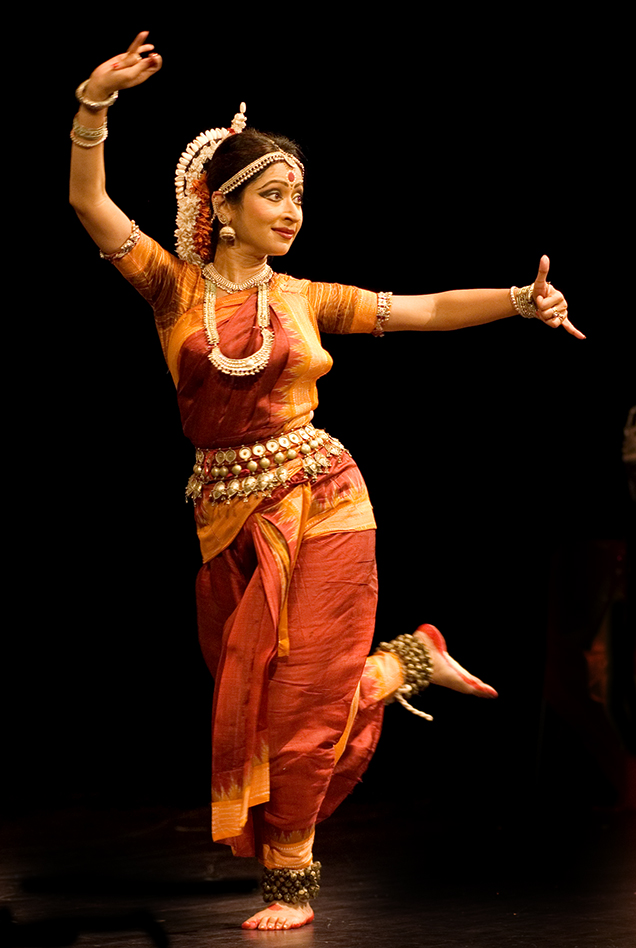
- Nandini performing an at the Coffman Memorial Union in the University of Minnesota.
- Born: India
- Occupations: Dancer, actress

Nandini Ghosal is an Indian Bengali classical dancer, choreographer and actress. After making her acting debut in the 1997 drama film Char Adhyay, Nandini played leading role in several Bengali films, such as Kichhhu Sanlap Kichhu Pralap (1999) and a Malayalam movie Sthithi (2003).

== Work ==
As a classical dancer, she learns to Odissi under Guru Poushali Mukherjee. After she took lesson under the tutelage of the maestro Guru Kelucharan Mahapatra. By this time she has played the central roles in several dance-dramas choreographed by Guru Mahapatra.

She had been a member of the World Arts Council, a UNESCO sponsored organization of the Valencian Government, Spain.

== Filmography ==
Title	Year	Role(s)	Language	Notes	Ref.
Char Adhyay	1997	Ela	Hindi	based on Rabindranath Tagore's last novel by the same name	
Kichhhu Sanlap Kichhu Pralap	1999	Ananya	Bengali	Special Jury Award at National Film Awards 1999	
Akeli	1999	Meera	Hindi		
Anya Swapna	2001	Nandini	Bengali	Short film	
Byatikrami	2003		Bengali	screenplay assistance	
Sthithi	2004	Vani	Malayalam		
Gandharvi	2008				
