= Mixed Doubles (2006 film) =

- Directed by: Rajat Kapoor
- Written by: Rajat Kapoor; Anurag Kashyap
- Produced by: Sunil Doshi
- Starring: Konkona Sen Sharma; Ranvir Shorey; Koel Purie; Rajat Kapoor
- Cinematography: Rafey Mehmood
- Edited by: Suresh Pai
- Music by: Sagar Desai
- Release date: 10 February 2006
- Country: India
- Language: Hinglish

Mixed Doubles (2006) is an Indian film directed by Rajat Kapoor. It stars Konkona Sen Sharma, Ranvir Shorey, Koel Purie and Rajat Kapoor. The film follows the general plot of a husband asking his wife to swap him for another male, while he swaps her for the other male's wife.

== Plot ==
Sunil Arora and his wife Malti with their son Avi lead a typical middle-class life in Mumbai metro. Having completed 10 years of marriage, Sunil feels he is getting old and is not able to satisfy his wife's advances in bedroom. Sammy and Vinay are Sunil's colleagues in his office and they share their domestic issues as a pastime. Things take a turn when a friend of Sunil's returns from U.S. and mentions about swinging, and how it has kept him visibly younger. After this Sunil gets obsessed with the concept and starts planning to "swing". Malti is upset with Sunil's obsession and does not give into his new found love. Still, Sunil starts connecting to possible swingers by responding to magazine advertisements, and finally gets hold of Mr. Vinod Khanna and they agree to meet once to get everybody's consensus.

== Cast ==
- Konkona Sen Sharma as Malti
- Ranvir Shorey as Sunil
- Koel Purie as Kalpana
- Rajat Kapoor as Vinod
- Saurabh Shukla as Sammy
- Vinay Pathak as Vinay
- Ash Chandler as Harsh
- Manu Rishi Chadha as Zoravar

== Release ==
Jay Weissberg of Variety wrote that "First half is enjoyably upbeat and thoroughly modern in repping a middle-class Bombay couple having bedroom problems, but the second part goes for cliches combined with uneasy humor that mixes messages and fails to get, um, a rise". Priyanka Jain of Rediff wrote that "And it's definitely worth watching once". Kaveree Bamzai of India Today wrote that "The movie is elegantly designed, its exotic colours making urban angst look Wong-kar-wai moody". Taran Adarsh of IndiaFM gave the film a rating of one-and-ahalf out of five and noted that "Director Rajat Kapoor gets it right in the first half, but not in the second".
