= Ashoke Viswanathan =

Bengali Indian filmmaker and theatre personality

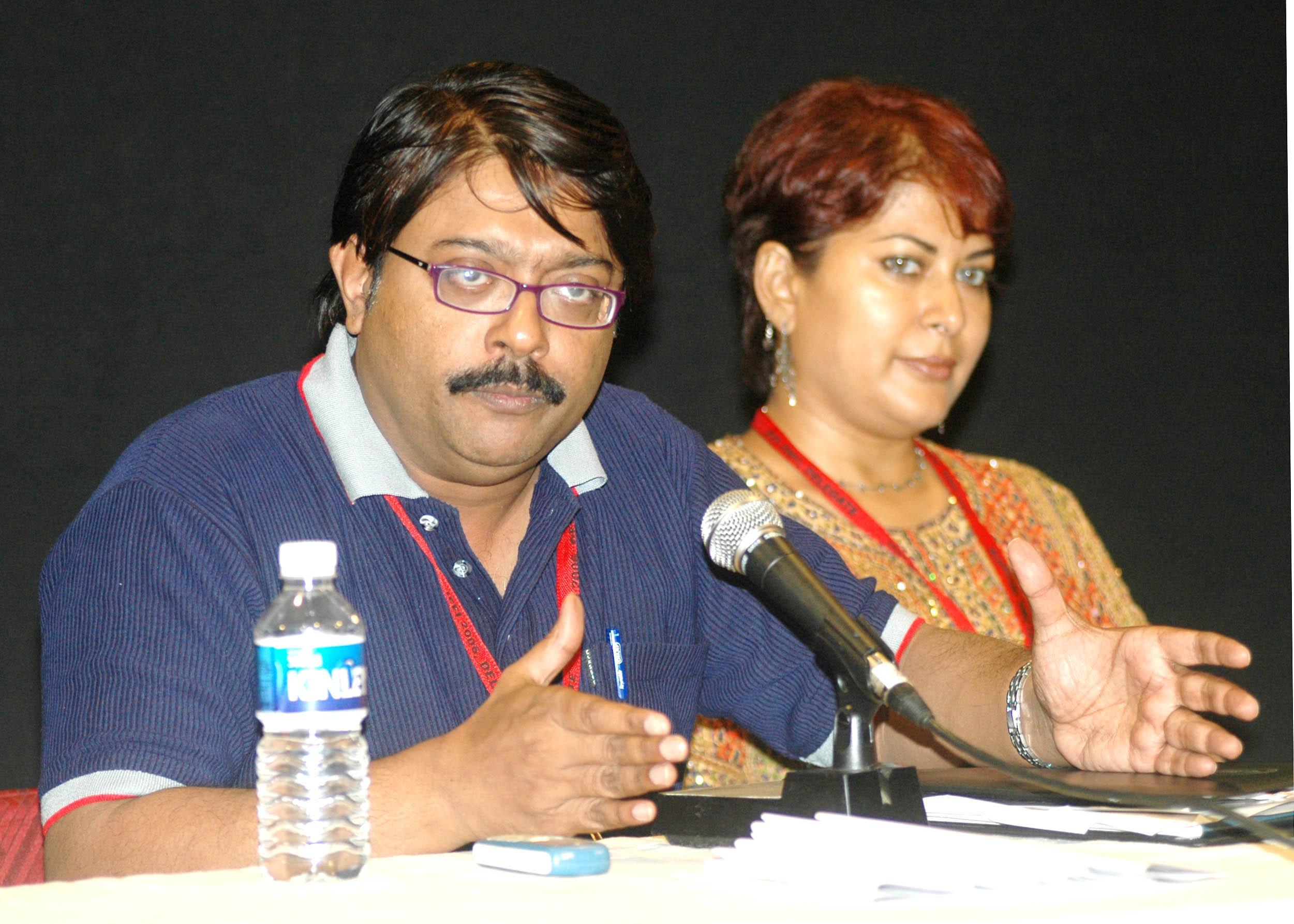
- Ashoke Viswanathan (left) at the IFFI in 2006
- Born: 1959 (age 66–67)
- Education: St. Xavier's College, Kolkata, Film and Television Institute of India
- Occupation: Film director
- Spouse: Madhumanti Maitra
- Children: Anusha
- Awards: Indira Gandhi Award for Best Debut Film of a Director, National Film Award – Special Jury Award

Ashoke Viswanathan (also Asoke, born in 1959) is a Bengali Indian filmmaker and theatre personality, based in Kolkata, India.

== Personal life ==
Viswanathan is the son of actor N. Viswanathan. He is a Mathematics graduate from St. Xavier's College, Kolkata and a graduate in film direction from the Film and Television Institute of India. He is married to Madhumanti Maitra, a lecturer at a girls' college and an anchor. He has a daughter, Anusha, who is an actor.

== Career ==
Viswanathan is currently a Professor and Head of Department of Producing For Film and TV specialisation and Dean (Film Wing) at Satyajit Ray Film and Television Institute and an occasional lecturer at Jadavpur University.

He has made award-winning features and documentaries, such as 2014's "The Lighthouse, The Ocean and The Sea", an exploration of the intellectual relationships between Rabindranath Tagore, Romain Rolland and Kalidas Nag. Two of Viswanathan's films have won national awards: his debut film "Shunya Theke Shuru" and "Kichu Sanglap Kichu Prolap"

He has also directed commercial films like "Sesh Sanghat", starring mainstream actors Jaya Prada and Jackie Shroff, and "Gumshuda" in Hindi, Malayalam and Tamil ("Vaira Kolaigal"), a whodunit based on Sherlock Holmes, targeted at a mass audience.

He has served as the Chairperson of the Jury for non-feature films for the National Film Awards.

Three of his feature films and two of his short features have been included in the INDIAN PANORAMA sections of IFFI '94, 1999, 2001, 2002 and 2005. His films have been shown at the Commonwealth Film Festival, Manchester, the Pyongyang International Film Festival, the Dhaka International Film Festival, and the Ipswich Film Festival, among others.

Viswanathan has represented India at the Cambridge Seminar on contemporary British writing, held at Downing College, Cambridge (1997).

== Filmography ==
Title	Year	Credited as				Notes	Ref(s)
Title	Year	Director	Writer	Producer	Other	Notes	Ref(s)
Shunya Theke Shuru	1993	Yes	Yes	No	Yes	as Ashok Viswanathan	
Kichhhu Sanlap Kichhu Pralap	1999	Yes	Yes	Yes	No		
Byatikrami	2003	Yes	No	Yes	Yes	planning	
Andhakarer Shabdo	2006	Yes	Yes	No	No	screenplay	
Sesh Sanghat	2009	Yes					
1+1=3 Ora Tinjon	2015	Yes	No	No	No		

== Awards ==
Year	Award	Category	Film	ref.
1993	National Film Awards	National Film Award for Best Debut Film of a Director	Shunya Theke Shuru	
1998	National Film Awards	National Film Award – Special Jury Award	Kichhhu Sanlap Kichhu Pralap	
