= Filmfare Critics Award for Best Film =

Honor awarded to Hindi films

Filmfare Award for Best Film
- Awarded for: Best Film
- Country: India
- Presented by: Filmfare
- First award: Uski Roti, Mani Kaul (1971)
- Currently held by: I Want to Talk, Shoojit Sircar (2025)
- Website: Filmfare Awards

The Filmfare Critics Award for Best Film is awarded during annual Filmfare Awards, given by the Filmfare magazine. These are the oldest and most prominent film awards given for Hindi films in India, having started in 1954. Movie awards were first given by popular vote. Many complained that films with commercial appeal rather than artistic merit were being recognised, hence a new award category was added, the Best Film (Critics). Mani Kaul has a record four wins in this category, followed by three wins each for Shoojit Sircar and Kumar Shahani.

Rajnigandha, Black and Zindagi Na Milegi Dobara are the only films to win both Best Film (Critics) and Best Film.

== Winner ==
In the list below, each individual entry shows the winning title, followed by the director of the film.

=== 1970s ===
Film	Winners	Year
Uski Roti	Mani Kaul	1971
Ashadh Ka Ek Din	Mani Kaul	1972
Maya Darpan	Kumar Shahani	1973
Duvidha	Mani Kaul	1974
Rajnigandha	Basu Chatterjee	1975
Aandhi	Gulzar	1976
Mrigayaa	Mrinal Sen	1977
Shatranj Ke Khilari	Satyajit Ray	1978
Arvind Desai Ki Ajeeb Dastaan	Saeed Akhtar Mirza	1979

=== 1980s ===
Film	Winners	Year
Jeena Yahan	Basu Chatterjee	1980
Albert Pinto Ko Gussa Kyon Aata Hai	Saeed Akhtar Mirza	1981
Aadharshila	Ashok Ahuja	1982
Masoom	Shekhar Kapur	1983
Sookha	M.S. Sathyu	1984
Damul	Prakash Jha	1985
Aghaat	Govind Nihalani	1986
Om-Dar-Ba-Dar	Kamal Swaroop	1989

=== 1990s ===
Film	Winners	Year
Khayal Gatha	Kumar Shahani	1990
Kasba	Kumar Shahani	1991
Diksha	Arun Kaul	1992
Idiot	Mani Kaul	1993
Kabhi Haan Kabhi Naa	Kundan Shah	1994
Bandit Queen	Shekhar Kapur	1995
Bombay	Mani Ratnam (the only dubbed film to win the award)	1996
Khamoshi: The Musical	Sanjay Leela Bhansali	1997
Virasat	Priyadarshan	1998
Satya	Ram Gopal Varma	1999

=== 2000s ===
Film	Winners	Year
Sarfarosh	John Matthew Matthan	2000
Halo	Santosh Sivan	2001
Dil Chahta Hai	Farhan Akhtar	2002
The Legend of Bhagat Singh	Rajkumar Santoshi	2003
Munna Bhai M.B.B.S.	Rajkumar Hirani	2004
Yuva & Dev	Mani Ratnam & Govind Nihalani	2005
Black	Sanjay Leela Bhansali	2006
Lage Raho Munna Bhai	Rajkumar Hirani	2007
Chak De! India	Shimit Amin	2008
Mumbai Meri Jaan	Nishikant Kamat	2009

=== 2010s ===
Year	Film	Recipient(s)
2010	Firaaq	Nandita Das
2011	Udaan	Vikramaditya Motwane
2012	Zindagi Na Milegi Dobara	Zoya Akhtar
2013	Gangs of Wasseypur	Anurag Kashyap
2014	The Lunchbox	Ritesh Batra
2015	Ankhon Dekhi	Rajat Kapoor
2016	Piku	Shoojit Sircar
2017	Neerja	Ram Madhvani
2018	Newton	Amit V. Masurkar
2019	Andhadhun	Sriram Raghavan

=== 2020s ===
Year	Film	Recipient(s)
2020	Article 15 & Sonchiriya	Anubhav Sinha & Abhishek Chaubey
2021	Eeb Allay Ooo!	Prateek Vats
2022	Sardar Udham	Shoojit Sircar
2023	Badhaai Do	Harshavardhan Kulkarni
2024	Joram	Devashish Makhija
2025	I Want to Talk	Shoojit Sircar

== See also ==
- Filmfare Award for Best Film
- Filmfare Awards
- Bollywood
- Cinema of India
