= Kichhu Sanglap Kichhu Pralap =

Kichhhu Sanlap Kichhu Pralap
- DVD Cover
- Directed by: Ashoke Viswanathan
- Screenplay by: Ashoke Viswanathan
- Produced by: Ashoke Viswanathan; Hillol Das; Romesh Gandhi
- Starring: Sanjiban Guha; Nandini Ghosal; Ashoke Viswanathan; Laboni Sarkar
- Narrated by: Ashoke Viswanathan
- Cinematography: Subhashish Banerjee
- Edited by: Mahadeb Shi
- Music by: Gautam Chattopadhyay
- Production companies: H.G. Films, AV Production, Rainbow Productions
- Distributed by: Drishyakavya
- Release date: 1999
- Running time: 118 min
- Country: India
- Language: Bengali

Kichhhu Sanlap Kichhu Pralap (English: Dialogue and Delirium) is a 1999 Indian Bengali drama film directed and produced by Ashoke Viswanathan, starting Ashoke Viswanathan, Sanjiban Guha and Nandini Ghosal in the lead roles. Screenplay written by Ashoke Viswanathan collaboratively with Shankar Bhaterjee, Prhalad Chattopadhay and Mrinmoy nandi.

The film is mostly based on Kolkata's gossip in Indian Coffee House of College Street, the relationship between two young couple and outside the film will probably appeal to communists and the intellectuals of Kolkata city in that time.

The film was generally received well by critics and won Indian Panorama at IFFI (1999) and National Film Awards (1999).

== Cast ==
- N. Viswanathan
- Sanjiban Guha as Newton
- Nandini Ghosal as Ananya
- Ashoke Viswanathan as Arup, narrator
- Tamal Ray Chowdhury
- Shyamal Bhattacharya
- Biswajit Chakraborty
- Amal Kar
- Sheo Kumar Jhunjhunwala
- Gautam Chattopadhyay
- Sumit Ghoshal
- Swaraj Chatterjee
- Pilu Bhattacharya
- Sankar Ghosh
- Gautam Mukherjee
- Shayamal Sengupta
- Shankar Bhattacharjee
- Goutam Sen
- Shyamal Sarkar
- Kunal Bhattacharjee
- Subhash Sarkar
- Sninda Shaha Chowdhury
- Mrinal Haldar
- Debjani Roy
- Dhritiman Chakrabarti
- Aboni Bhatercharjee
- Dibyendu Mukherjee
- Laboni Sarkar

== Music ==
=== List of tracks ===
No.	Title	Singer(s)	Length
1.	"Kichhu Sanglap Kichhu Prolap"	Madhumati Maitra
2.	"Amar Priya Cafe"	Gautam Chattopadhyay
3.	"Dhandar Thekeo Jotil Tumi"	Subrata Das
4.	"Kotoki Korar Aachhe Baki"	Gautam Chattopadhyay

== Awards ==
- Won - Indian Panorama at International Film Festival of India (IFFI) (1999)
- Won - Special Jury Award at 46th National Film Awards (1999)
