= Harpreet Sandhu (actor) =

Indian actor, director, writer, and producer

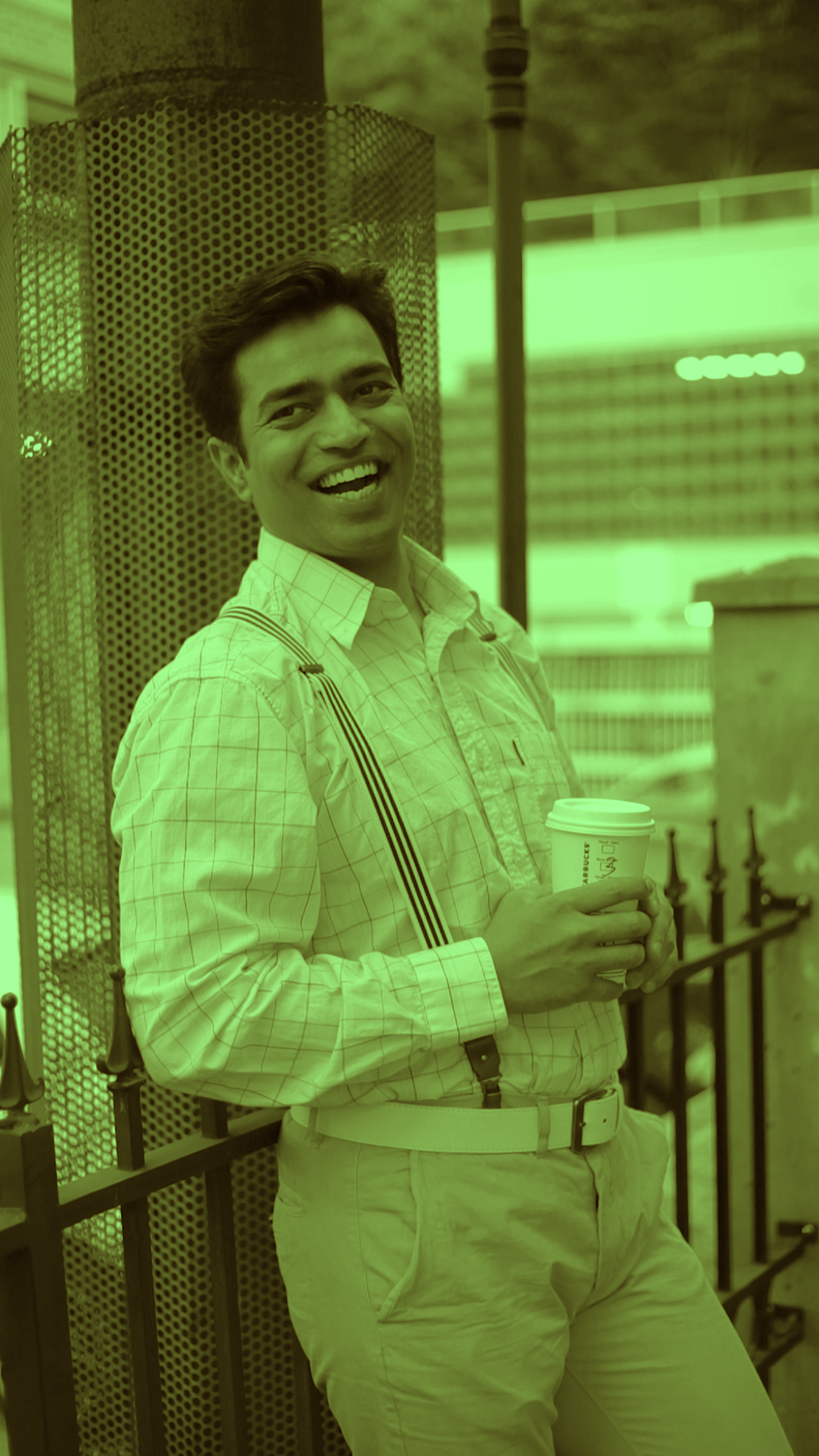
- Sandhu in 2015
- Born: 8 January 1979 (age 47); Rurka Kalan, Punjab, India
- Occupations: Actor, director, producer, writer, musician
- Years active: 2009–present
- Height: 5 ft 11 in (1.80 m)
- Awards: 2015 Nominated National Award top25 People's Choice Canadian Immigrant; 2015 Shortlist 87th Academy Awards
- Website: Official website

Harpreet Sandhu (born 8 January 1979) is an Indian actor, director, writer, music director, editor, cinematographer and poet. His debut Punjabi film Work Weather Wife was the first ever Punjabi and only Canadian film to get shortlisted at 87th Academy Awards under Best Original Song in a feature film and Best Feature Film for its songs "Moon" and "Long Braid".

== Early life ==
Sandhu was born in Rurka Kalan, Punjab, India and spent the early part of his life living in a remote village. He is a graduate of Khalsa College, Amritsar and he trained under Hollywood actress Debra Podowski in Vancouver, British Columbia, Canada.

== Professional work ==
Sandhu is an actor and film maker. His debut film is Work Weather Wife in 2014. He has worked with Alka Yagnik. He has acted in Indian and international films. He dubbed Wahgan Hawaawan, in Urdu for ArtGauge Films Inc. and scripted the Urdu version of poems for Work Weather Wife.

He has been associated with advertising since 2009 as a model, choreographer, copywriter, producer and director.

== Filmography ==
Film
Year	Title	Role	Notes
2010	Swallowed Whole	Mr. Gill	
2010	Judaaiyaan: The Separation	Villain	
2011	My Hope	Cameo	
2012	Through My Eyes	Avi	
2012	My Suicide	Cameo	
2013	Thuk La Ke	Avi	
2013	Diwali	Himself	
2013	2013 Kabaddi World Cup	Athlete	
2014	Work Weather Wife	Vick	
2015	Monologo	Lead	
2016	Star Trek Beyond	Uncredited bridge crew	

== Awards and nominations ==
On March 19, 2015, Sandhu was nominated for Canadian Immigrant Award, recognizing the top 25 Canadian immigrants of the year, sponsored by RBC.

- Won: Los Angeles Movie Awards for Judaaiyaan: The Separation (2011)
- Won: Toronto Independent Film Festival: Judaaiyaan: The Separation (2011)
- Won: Los Angeles Reel Film Festival: Judaaiyaan: The Separation (2011) – As producer
