= Fritz Bennewitz =

German theatre director (1926–1995)

- Born: 20 January 1926; Chemnitz, Saxony, Germany
- Died: 13 September 1995 (aged 69); Weimar, Thuringia, Germany
- Occupation: Theatre Director

Fritz Bennewitz (20 January 1926 – 13 September 1995) was a German theatre director.

== Life ==
Bennewitz was born in Chemnitz. His father was a train driver: his mother worked as a seamstress.

Between 1950 and 1953 he was a student of German studies (language, literature, linguistics) at Leipzig and of Theatre at the German Theatre Institute in Weimar. He went on to lecture on Aesthetics at the Leipzig Theatre Academy. He became a senior theatre director at Meiningen in 1955 where he remained till 1960, which was when he took a position as director at the German National Theatre at Weimar. Fritz Bennewitz became a corresponding member of the Berlin-based Academy of Arts in 1969 and a full member in 1974.

== Career highlights ==
From as far back as 1957 Bennewitz showed his determination to promote the work of Bertolt Brecht beyond Berlin. By 1960 his Meiningen Court Theatre had become the second most important Brecht theatre in the German Democratic Republic. He brought his Meiningen production of The Threepenny Opera to Berlin for the 1958 Festival, where it was a great success.

He was also known for his productions of the two parts of Goethe's Faust at Weimar in 1965-67, 1975–76 and 1981-82. In addition, he staged Faust with the Berliner Ensemble theatre company, both at the Deutsches Theater and at the Volksbühne theatre in Berlin. At the time of his death in September 1995 he had just started on rehearsals for a Faust production at the Meiningen theatre where he had started out as a director forty years earlier.

After 1970 he also became successful overseas, with more than twenty touring productions of works by Goethe, Brecht and Shakespeare in Latin America, Southeast Asia and in India where, in 1991, he received the Sangeet Natak Akademi Award. Starting in 1977, he also took to conducting "Brecht seminars" in the United States, India and the Philippines.

== Further appointment ==
Reflecting his heightened profile internationally, Fritz Bennewitz became a consultant and then, in 1984, a vice-president of the International Theatre Institute.
