= Parallel cinema =

1950s movement in Indian cinema

- Years active: 1952–1992 (first wave), 1998–current (resurgence)
- Location: India
- Major figures: Satyajit Ray; Ritwik Ghatak; Mrinal Sen; Tapan Sinha; Adoor Gopalakrishnan; Balu Mahendra; G. Aravindan; Shyam Benegal; Girish Karnad; Vijaya Mehta; Jabbar Patel; Girish Kasaravalli; Shaji N.Karun; Buddhadeb Dasgupta; Jahnu Barua; Goutam Ghose; B. Narsing Rao; Nagesh Kukunoor; Rituparno Ghosh; K. N. T. Sastry; Ram Gopal Varma; Mani Kaul; Saeed Akhtar Mirza; Ashim Ahluwalia; V. Shantaram
- Influences: Indian theatre, Bengali literature, social realism, poetic realism, Italian neorealism

Parallel cinema, or New Indian Cinema, is a film movement in Indian cinema that originated in the state of West Bengal in the 1950s as an alternative to the mainstream commercial Indian cinema.

Inspired by Italian Neorealism, Parallel Cinema began just before the French New Wave and Japanese New Wave, and was a precursor to the Indian New Wave of the 1960s. The movement was initially led by Bengali cinema and produced internationally acclaimed filmmakers such as Satyajit Ray, Mrinal Sen, Ritwik Ghatak, Tapan Sinha and others. It later gained prominence in other film industries of India.

It is known for its serious content, realism and naturalism, symbolic elements with a keen eye on the sociopolitical climate of the times, and the general rejection of inserted song-and-dance routines that are typical of mainstream Indian films.

== History ==
=== Origins ===
Realism in Indian cinema dates back to the 1920s and 1930s. One of the earliest examples was Baburao Painter's 1925 silent film classic Savkari Pash (Indian Shylock), about a poor peasant (portrayed by V. Shantaram) who "loses his land to a greedy moneylender and is forced to migrate to the city to become a mill worker. Acclaimed as a realistic breakthrough, its shot of a howling dog near a hut, has become a milestone in the march of Indian cinema." The 1937 Shantaram film Duniya Na Mane (The Unaccepted) also critiqued the treatment of women in Indian society.

=== Early years ===
The Parallel Cinema movement began to take shape from the late 1940s, by pioneers such as Satyajit Ray, Ritwik Ghatak, Bimal Roy, Mrinal Sen, Tapan Sinha, Khwaja Ahmad Abbas, Buddhadeb Dasgupta, Chetan Anand, Guru Dutt and V. Shantaram. This period is considered part of the 'Golden Age' of Indian cinema. This cinema borrowed heavily from the Indian literature of the times, hence became an important study of the contemporary Indian society, and is now used by scholars and historians alike to map the changing demographics and socio-economic as well as political temperament of the Indian populace.

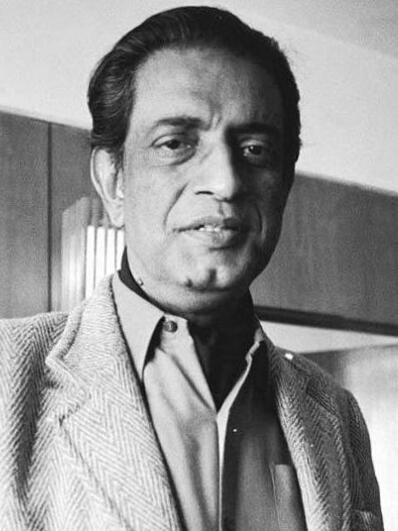
Satyajit Ray

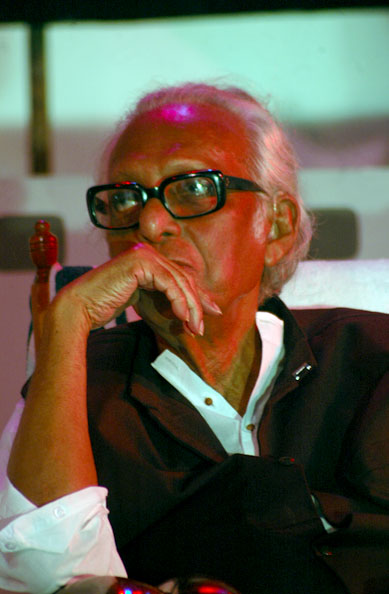
Mrinal Sen

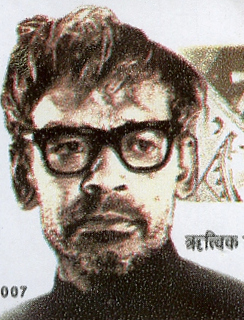
Ritwik Ghatak

Early examples of Indian cinema's social realist movement include Dharti Ke Lal (1946), a film about the Bengal famine of 1943 directed and written by Khwaja Ahmad Abbas, and Neecha Nagar (1946), a film directed by Chetan Anand and written by Khwaja Ahmad Abbas that won the Grand Prize at the first Cannes Film Festival. Since then, Indian independent films were frequently in competition for the Palme d'Or at the Cannes Film Festival throughout the 1950s and early 1960s, with some of them winning major prizes at the festival.

During the 1950s and the 1960s, intellectual filmmakers and story writers became frustrated with musical films. To counter this, they created a genre of films which depicted reality from an artful perspective. Most films made during this period were funded by state governments to promote an authentic art genre from the Indian film fraternity. The most famous Indian "neo-realist" was the Bengali film director Satyajit Ray, followed by Shyam Benegal, Mrinal Sen, Adoor Gopalakrishnan, G. Aravindan and Girish Kasaravalli. Ray's most famous films were Pather Panchali (1955), Aparajito (1956) and The World of Apu (1959), which formed The Apu Trilogy. Produced on a shoestring budget of Rs. 150,000 ($3000), the three films won major prizes at the Cannes, Berlin and Venice Film Festivals, and are today frequently listed among the greatest films of all time.

Certain art films have also garnered commercial success, in an industry known for its surrealism or 'fantastical' movies, and successfully combined features of both art and commercial cinema. An early example of this was Bimal Roy's Do Bigha Zamin (1953), which was both a commercial and critical success. The film won the International Prize at the 1954 Cannes Film Festival and paved the way for the Indian New Wave. Hrishikesh Mukherjee, one of Hindi cinema's most successful filmmakers, was named the pioneer of 'middle cinema', and was renowned for making films that reflected the changing middle-class ethos. According to Encyclopædia Britannica, Mukherjee "carved a middle path between the extravagance of mainstream cinema and the stark realism of art cinema". Renowned Filmmaker Basu Chatterjee also built his plots on middle-class lives and directed films like Piya Ka Ghar, Rajnigandha and Ek Ruka Hua Faisla. Another filmmaker to integrate art and commercial cinema was Guru Dutt, whose film Pyaasa (1957) featured in Time magazine's "All-TIME" 100 best movies list. The most recent example of an art film becoming commercially successful is Harpreet Sandhu's Canadian Punjabi film Work Weather Wife; it marks the beginning of cinema in the Punjabi film industry.

In the 1960s, the Indian government began financing independent art films based on Indian themes. Many of the directors were graduates of the Film and Television Institute of India (FTII), in Pune. The Bengali film director Ritwik Ghatak was a professor at the institute and a well-known director. Unlike Ray, however, Ghatak did not gain international fame during his lifetime. For example, Ghatak's Nagarik (1952) was perhaps the earliest example of a Bengali art film, preceding Ray's Pather Panchali by three years, but was not released until after his death in 1977. His first commercial release Ajantrik (1958) was also one of the earliest films to portray an inanimate object, in this case an automobile, as a character in the story, many years before the Herbie films. The protagonist of Ajantrik, Bimal, can also be seen as an influence on the cynical cab driver Narasingh (played by Soumitra Chatterjee) in Satyajit Ray's Abhijan (1962).

The Cinema of Karnataka saw its first ray of hope of surrealism in N. Lakshminarayan's directorial debut Naandi (1964). Featuring mainstream actors like Rajkumar, Kalpana and Harini, the film was both a critical and commercial success. Produced by Vadiraj, it set a landmark by being the first ever Kannada film to screen at an International film festival. The movement gained significant momentum in the 1970s and 1980s resulting in numerous national awards and international recognition to Kannada cinema.

The Cinema of Maharashtra saw its first significant movement towards realism and artistic expression with the emergence of parallel cinema in the 1950s and 1960s. One of the pioneering films of this era was Shyamchi Aai (1953), directed by Pralhad Keshav Atre. Based on the novel by Sane Guruji, the film explored a boy named Shyam shares a deep bond with his mother, who has had a significant influence on his life and upbringing. She instilled in him the importance of sticking to his ideals and principles, even when faced with poverty and hardships. It was both a critical and commercial success, making a lasting impact on Marathi cinema. The Marathi parallel cinema movement truly gained momentum in the 1970s and 1980s, due to filmmakers like Vijay Tendulkar, Jabbar Patel and Rajdutt. This era produced films that focused on social realism, shedding light on the struggles of the marginalized, rural life, and complex human relationships. The movement brought national awards and international recognition to Marathi cinema, with films like Ghashiram Kotwal (1976), Samna, Jait Re Jait (1977), Sinhasan (1979), Umbartha (1982) which were praised for their bold narratives and artistic direction. This era of Marathi cinema also laid the foundation for later filmmakers to experiment with different forms and explore the nuances of human emotion, regional culture, and societal issues. The legacy of parallel cinema continues to influence Marathi cinema, with films like Shwaas (2004) directed by Sandeep Sawant, Fandry (2014) directed by Nagraj Manjule and Court (2015) directed by Chaitanya Tamhane receiving international acclaim.

=== Growth ===
During the 1970s and the 1980s, parallel cinema entered into the limelight of Hindi cinema to a much wider extent. This was led by such directors as Gulzar, Shyam Benegal, Mani Kaul, Rajinder Singh Bedi, Kantilal Rathod and Saeed Akhtar Mirza, and later on directors like Govind Nihalani, becoming the main directors of this period's Indian art cinema. Mani Kaul's first several films Uski Roti (1971), Ashadh Ka Ek Din (1972), Duvidha (1974), and were critically appreciated and held to high esteem in the international spotlight. Benegal's directorial debut, Ankur (Seeding, 1974) was a major critical success, and was followed by numerous works that created another field in the movement. Kumar Shahani, a student of Ritwik Ghatak, released his first feature Maya Darpan (1972) which became a landmark film of Indian art cinema. These filmmakers tried to promote realism in their own different styles, though many of them often accepted certain conventions of popular cinema. Parallel cinema of this time gave careers to a whole new breed of young actors, including Shabana Azmi, Smita Patil, Amol Palekar, Om Puri, Naseeruddin Shah, Kulbhushan Kharbanda, Pankaj Kapoor, Deepti Naval, Farooq Shaikh, and even actors from commercial cinema like Hema Malini, Raakhee, Rekha ventured into art cinema.

Adoor Gopalakrishnan extended the Indian New Wave to Malayalam cinema with his maiden feature film Swayamvaram in 1972. Long after the Golden Age of Indian cinema, Malayalam cinema experienced its own 'Golden Age' in the 1980s and early 1990s. Some of the most acclaimed Indian filmmakers at the time were from the Malayalam industry, including Adoor Gopalakrishnan, K. P. Kumaran, G. Aravindan, John Abraham, Padmarajan, Bharathan, T. V. Chandran and Shaji N. Karun. Gopalakrishnan, who is often considered to be Satyajit Ray's spiritual heir, directed some of his most acclaimed films during this period, including Elippathayam (1981) which won the Sutherland Trophy at the London Film Festival, as well as Mathilukal (1989) which won major prizes at the Venice Film Festival. Shaji N. Karun's debut film Piravi (1989) won the Camera d'Or at the 1989 Cannes Film Festival, while his second film Swaham (1994) was in competition for the Palme d'Or at the 1994 Cannes Film Festival. His third film Vanaprastham (1999) was also selected to Cannes Film Festival, making him the only Indian film maker who could take consecutively three films to Cannes.

K. Balachander, C.V. Sridhar, Mahendran, Balu Mahendra, Bharathiraja, Mani Ratnam, Kamal Haasan, Bala, Selvaraghavan, Mysskin, Vetrimaaran and Ram have done the same for Tamil cinema, During the domination of commercial cinema in Telugu, Pattabhirami Reddy, K. N. T. Sastry, B. Narsing Rao, and Akkineni Kutumba Rao pioneered Telugu parallel cinema to international recognition.

Girish Kasaravalli, Girish Karnad and B. V. Karanth led the way for parallel cinema in the Kannada film industry. Many literary stalwarts entered or collaborated with cinema in this period. Some of the other notable filmmakers of this period were P. Lankesh, G. V. Iyer, M. S. Sathyu who were later followed by T. S. Nagabharana, Baraguru Ramachandrappa, Shankar Nag, Chandrashekhara Kambara in the 1980s. Actors like Lokesh, Anant Nag, L. V. Sharada, Vasudeva Rao, Suresh Heblikar, Vaishali Kasaravalli, Arundhati Nag and others rose to fame.

Bhabendra Nath Saikia and Jahnu Barua did it for Assamese cinema, while Aribam Syam Sharma pioneered parallel movies in Manipuri cinema.

=== Decline ===
By the early 1990s, the rising costs involved in film production and the commercialisation of the films had a negative impact on the art films. The fact that investment returns cannot be guaranteed made art films less popular amongst filmmakers.

=== Other major reasons for decline ===
One of the major reasons for the decline of the parallel cinema in India is that the F.F.C. or the National Film Development Corporation of India did not seriously look into the distribution or exhibition of these films. The mainstream exhibition system did not pick up these films because these films did not have the so-called 'entertainment value' that they were looking for. There was a talk of building small theatres for such film, but there was no serious attempt made to realise this alternative mode of exhibition. Thus, it left to a few Film Societies to screen these film; that too on a single screening basis. The advent of television and its popularity saw the film society movement decline. Gradually, the government reduced the patronage of such films, for they had only unseen films to be shown on their balance sheets.

The Parallel Cinema in its true sense was always on the fringes of the mainstream cinema. Since most of the parallel cinema rejected the regressive worldview that was largely embodied the mainstream cinema they never found acceptance in the mainstream production, distribution and exhibition system. With an absence of an alternative exhibition system or an art house circuit as it is called in the west, many of the off beat films made by present generation film makers like Sushant Mishra, Himanshu Khatua, Ashish Avikunthak, Murali Nair, Amitabh Chakraborty, Paresh Kamdar, Priya Krishnaswamy, Vipin Vijay, Ramchandra PN, Ashwini Mallik, Anand Subramanian, Sanjivan Lal, Amit Dutta, Umesh Vinayak Kulkarni, Gurvinder Singh, and Bela Negi have never had a large audience.

=== Resurgence ===
The term "parallel cinema" has started being applied to off-beat films produced in Bollywood, where art films have begun experiencing a resurgence. This led to the emergence of a distinct genre known as Mumbai noir, urban films reflecting social problems in the city of Mumbai. The introduction of Mumbai noir was marked by Ram Gopal Varma's Satya (1998). However the Mumbai noir is a genre that is not considered artistic in ambition even though it concentrates on realistic portrayal of the Mumbai underworld; these are generally commercial films.

Other modern examples of art films produced in India which are classified as part of the parallel cinema genre include Rituparno Ghosh's Utsab (2000) and Dahan (1997), Tarun Majumdar's Alo (2003), Mani Ratnam's Yuva (2004), Nagesh Kukunoor's 3 Deewarein (2003) and Dor (2006), Manish Jha's Matrubhoomi (2004), Sudhir Mishra's Hazaaron Khwaishein Aisi (2005), Jahnu Barua's Maine Gandhi Ko Nahin Mara (2005), Pan Nalin's Valley of Flowers (2006), Onir's My Brother… Nikhil (2005) and Bas Ek Pal (2006), Anurag Kashyap's Black Friday (2007), Vikramaditya Motwane's Udaan (2009), Kiran Rao's Dhobi Ghat (2010), Amit Dutta's Sonchidi (2011), and Anand Gandhi's Ship of Theseus (2013).

Independent films spoken in Indian English include Revathi's Mitr, My Friend (2002), Aparna Sen's Mr. and Mrs. Iyer (2002) and 15 Park Avenue (2006), Homi Adajania's Being Cyrus (2006), Rituparno Ghosh's The Last Lear (2007), and Sooni Taraporevala's Little Zizou (2009).

Some of the Indian art film directors active today include Buddhadeb Dasgupta, Aparna Sen, Gautam Ghose, Sandip Ray (Satyajit Ray's son), Kaushik Ganguly, Suman Mukhopadhyay, Kamaleshwar Mukherjee and Soukarya Ghosal in Bengali cinema; Adoor Gopalakrishnan, Shaji N. Karun, T. V. Chandran, M.P. Sukumaran Nair, Shyamaprasad, Dr. Biju and Sanal Kumar Sasidharan in Malayalam cinema; Kumar Shahani, Ketan Mehta, Govind Nihalani, Shyam Benegal, Amit Dutta, Manish Jha, Ashim Ahluwalia, Mudasir Dar, Anurag Kashyap, Anand Gandhi, and Deepa Mehta in Hindi Cinema; Mani Ratnam and Bala in Tamil, Rajnesh Domalpalli and Narasimha Nandi in Telugu cinema, Jahnu Barua in Hindi cinema and Assamese Cinema, Amol Palekar, Nagraj Manjule, Umesh Vinayak Kulkarni, Paresh Mokashi, Sumitra Bhave–Sunil Sukthankar, Gajendra Ahire, Sandeep Sawant, Ananth Mahadevan, Makarand Mane, Shivaji Lotan Patil, and Chaitanya Tamhane in Marathi Cinema and Amartya Bhattacharyya who makes independent films in Odia and Bengali.

Aamir Khan, with his production studio, introduced his own brand of social cinema in the early 21st century, blurring the distinction between commercial masala films and realistic parallel cinema, combining the entertainment and production values of the former with the believable narratives and strong messages of the latter. He has helped introduce parallel cinema to mainstream audiences, with his films earning both commercial success and critical acclaim in India and overseas.

== Global discourse ==
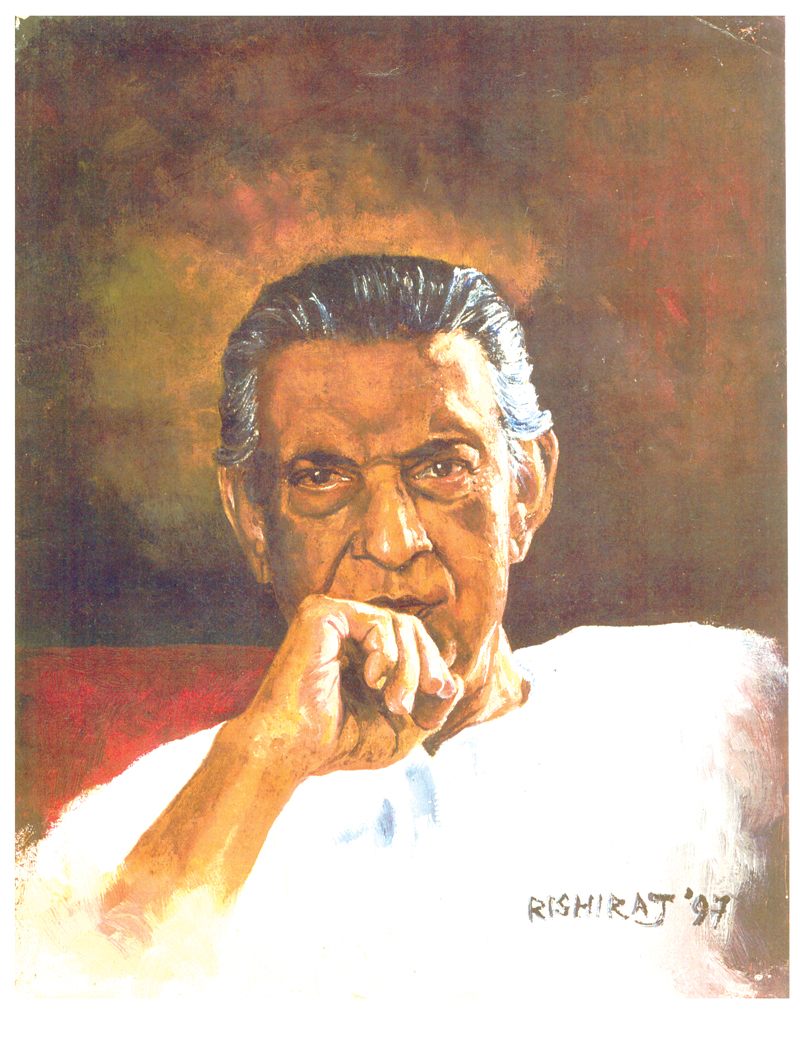
Satyajit Ray, pioneer of parallel cinema

During the formative period of Indian parallel cinema in the 1940s and 1950s, the movement was influenced by Italian cinema and French cinema, particularly by Italian neorealism as well as French poetic realism. Satyajit Ray particularly cited Italian filmmaker Vittorio De Sica's Bicycle Thieves (1948) and French filmmaker Jean Renoir's The River (1951), which he assisted, as influences on his debut film Pather Panchali (1955), alongside influences from Bengali literature and classical Indian theatre. Bimal Roy's Do Bigha Zamin (1953) was also influenced by De Sica's Bicycle Thieves. The Indian New Wave also began around the same time as the French New Wave and the Japanese New Wave.

Ever since Chetan Anand's Neecha Nagar won the Grand Prize at the inaugural Cannes Film Festival in 1946, Indian parallel cinema films frequently appeared in international fora and film festivals for the next several decades. This allowed Indian independent filmmakers to reach a global audience. The most influential among them was Satyajit Ray, whose films became successful among European, American and Asian audiences. His work subsequently had a worldwide impact, with filmmakers such as Martin Scorsese, James Ivory, Abbas Kiarostami, Elia Kazan, François Truffaut, Carlos Saura and Wes Anderson being influenced by his cinematic style, and many others such as Akira Kurosawa praising his work. The "youthful coming-of-age dramas that have flooded art houses since the mid-fifties owe a tremendous debt to the Apu trilogy" (1955–1959). Ray's film Kanchenjungha (1962) introduced a narrative structure that resembles later hyperlink cinema. Ray's 1967 script for a film to be called The Alien, which was eventually cancelled, is widely believed to have been the inspiration for Steven Spielberg's ET (1982). Ira Sachs' Forty Shades of Blue (2005) was a loose remake of Charulata, and in Gregory Nava's My Family (1995), the final scene is duplicated from the final scene of The World of Apu (1959). Similar references to Ray films are found in recent works such as Sacred Evil (2006), the Elements trilogy of Deepa Mehta, and in the films of Jean-Luc Godard.

Another prominent filmmaker is Mrinal Sen, whose films have been well known for their Marxist views. During his career, Mrinal Sen's film have received awards from almost all major film festivals, including Cannes, Berlin, Venice, Moscow, Karlovy Vary, Montreal, Chicago, and Cairo. Retrospectives of his films have been shown in almost all major cities of the world.

Another Bengali independent filmmaker, Ritwik Ghatak, began reaching a global audience long after his death; beginning in the 1990s, a project to restore Ghatak's films was undertaken, and international exhibitions (and subsequent DVD releases) have belatedly generated an increasingly global audience. Alongside Ray's films, Ghatak's films have also appeared in several all-time greatest film polls. A number of Satyajit Ray films appeared in the Sight & Sound Critics' Poll, including The Apu Trilogy (ranked No. 4 in 1992 if votes are combined), The Music Room (ranked No. 27 in 1992), Charulata (ranked No. 41 in 1992) and Days and Nights in the Forest (ranked No. 81 in 1982). The 2002 Sight & Sound critics' and directors' poll also included the Guru Dutt films Pyaasa and Kaagaz Ke Phool (both tied at #160), and the Ritwik Ghatak films Meghe Dhaka Tara (ranked #231) and Komal Gandhar (ranked #346). In 1998, the critics' poll conducted by the Asian film magazine Cinemaya included The Apu Trilogy (ranked No. 1 if votes are combined), Ray's Charulata and The Music Room (both tied at #11), and Ghatak's Subarnarekha (also tied at #11). In 1999, The Village Voice top 250 "Best Film of the Century" critics' poll also included The Apu Trilogy (ranked No. 5 if votes are combined). The Apu Trilogy, Pyaasa and Mani Ratnam's Nayakan were also included in Time magazine's "All-TIME" 100 best movies list in 2005. In 1992, the Sight & Sound Critics' Poll ranked Ray at No. 7 in its list of "Top 10 Directors" of all time, while Dutt was ranked No. 73 in the 2002 Sight & Sound greatest directors poll.

The cinematographer Subrata Mitra, who made his debut with Ray's The Apu Trilogy, also had an importance influence on cinematography across the world. One of his most important techniques was bounce lighting, to recreate the effect of daylight on sets. He pioneered the technique while filming Aparajito (1956), the second part of The Apu Trilogy. Some of the experimental techniques which Satyajit Ray pioneered include photo-negative flashbacks and X-ray digressions while filming Pratidwandi (1972).

== Directors ==
A

- Adoor Gopalakrishnan
- Aditya Vikram Sengupta
- Ashim Ahluwalia
- Abhishek Chaubey
- Anurag Kashyap
- Aparna Sen
- Apurba Kishore Bir
- Atanu Ghosh
- G. Aravindan
- Amit Dutta
- Amol Palekar
- Anand Gandhi
- Anant Balani
- Anjan Das
- Ashish Avikunthak
- Amartya Bhattacharyya
- Ajitpal Singh
- Arvind Deshpande

B

- Balu Mahendra
- Bala
- Bharathan
- Basu Bhattacharya
- Bhabendra Nath Saikia
- Dr. Biju
- Biju Viswanath
- Bimal Roy
- Buddhadeb Dasgupta
- Bharathiraja
- Bhalji Pendharkar

C

- T. V. Chandran
- Chetan Anand
- Chandrakant Kulkarni
- Chaitanya Tamhane

D

- Dadasaheb Phalke
- Deepa Mehta
- Devashish Makhija
- Dibakar Banerjee
- Dileesh Pothan
- Don Palathara

F

- Fazil

G

- Gautam Ghose
- Gajendra Ahire
- K. G. George
- Girish Karnad
- Girish Kasaravalli
- Gitanjali Rao
- Govind Nihalani
- Guru Dutt
- Gurvinder Singh

H

- K. Hariharan

J

- Jabbar Patel
- Jahar Kanungo
- Jahnu Barua

K

- Kalpana Lajmi
- Kamal Swaroop
- Kamal Haasan
- Kanu Behl
- B V Karanth
- K. Viswanath
- Kaushik Ganguly
- Ketan Mehta
- Khwaja Ahmad Abbas
- Kishore Sahu
- Kiran Rao
- Kumar Shahani
- K. Balachander

L

- Lijo Jose Pellissery

M

- Mahendran
- Mani Kaul
- Mani Ratnam
- Mysskin
- Manish Jha
- Madhur Bhandarkar
- Makarand Mane
- Mira Nair
- Moni Bhattacharjee
- Mrinal Sen
- Murali Nair
- Manmohan Mahapatra
- Mohan

N

- Nabendu Chatterjee
- Nagesh Kukunoor
- Nagraj Manjule
- Nandita Das
- Narendra Suri
- B. Narsing Rao
- Nirad Mohapatra
- Nishikant Kamat

P

- Padmarajan
- Pan Nalin
- Partho Sen-Gupta
- Paresh Mokashi
- Pattabhirami Reddy
- Piyush Jha
- Prakash Jha
- Priyanandanan
- Puttanna Kanagal
- Payal Kapadia

R

- Rajat Kapoor
- Rajiv Ravi
- Rajiv Patil
- Rajdutt
- Rajesh Mapuskar
- Ram
- Ram Gopal Varma
- Ranjan Ghosh
- Revathi
- Rituparno Ghosh
- Ritwik Ghatak

S

- Saeed Akhtar Mirza
- Saleem Ahmed
- Sanjoy Nag
- Sandeep Reddy Vanga
- Sandeep Sawant
- Sandip Ray
- Santosh Sivan
- Sanjay Surkar
- K. N. T. Sastry
- M. S. Sathyu
- Sathish Kalathil
- Satyajit Ray
- Sameer Vidwans
- Selvaraghavan
- Shyamaprasad
- Shaji N. Karun
- V. Shantaram
- Shantaram Athavale
- Shekhar Kapur
- Shonali Bose
- Shoojit Sircar
- Shivaji Lotan Patil
- Shyam Benegal
- Singeetam Srinivasa Rao
- Sombhu Mitra
- Sonali Gulati
- Sooni Taraporevala
- Soukarya Ghosal
- Sridhar Rangayan
- Srinivas Sunderrajan
- Sriram Raghavan
- Sumitra Bhave–Sunil Sukthankar

T

- Thiagarajan Kumararaja

U

- Upendra
- Umesh Vinayak Kulkarni
- Utpalendu Chakraborty

V

- Vetrimaaran
- Kumar G. Venkatesh
- Vishal Bhardwaj
- Vipin Vijay
- Vijaya Mehta

== See also ==
- Soviet parallel cinema
- Italian neorealism
- Cinema Novo
- List of cinema industries by location
- Cinema of India
- Cinema of West Bengal
- Masala film
- National Film Award for Best Feature Film
- New generation (Malayalam film movement)
