= Work Weather Wife =

- Official poster
- Directed by: Harpreet Sandhu
- Written by: Harpreet Sandhu
- Produced by: Harpreet Sandhu, Reema Nagra
- Starring: Harpreet Sandhu; Reema Nagra; Dilbag Brar; Kirat Bhattal
- Music by: Harpreet Sandhu, Sukhjinder Alfaaz
- Distributed by: StarGauge Films Inc.
- Release date: 14 November 2014
- Country: Canada
- Language: Punjabi

Work Weather Wife (Gurmukhi: ਵਰਕ ਵੇਦਰ ਵਾਈਫ, Devanagari: वोर्क वेदेर वाईफ़) is a Canadian Punjabi feature film starring Harpreet Sandhu and Reema Nagra in the lead role with Dilbag Brar and Kirat Bhattal and is directed by Harpreet Sandhu.

The film had two songs, "Moon" and "Long Braid" in consideration for a nomination for Academy Award for Best Original Song prior to the 87th Academy Awards. At the 72nd Golden Globe Awards for Best Foreign Language Feature Film, Work Weather Wife was one of 53 films approved for consideration in the Foreign Language category.

== Plot ==
Vick tricks his way into Dimple and CJ's fragile family. The film outlines the major community issue of honour killings. CJ, who belongs to the working class, doesn't have time for the daily household routine, and Vick outsmarts CJ on a scam.

== Cast ==
- Harpreet Sandhu as Vick, an NRI living in Vancouver, BC
- Reema Nagra as Dimple, an NRI living in Vancouver, BC
- Dilbag Brar as CJ, Dimple's husband
- B K Singh Rakhra as Vick's father
- Mani Kahlon as Bobby, Vick's friend
- Eline Mets as Amber
- Abi Centrik as Boy
- Kirat Bhattal as Gugni, CJ's daughter
- Jagmohan Bhandari as Psychiatrist
- Monsoon Sondhi as Vick's sister
- Sukhi Waraich as Vick's sister's boyfriend
- Alicia Karl as Monique
- Deepika Singh as Kashish

== Soundtrack ==
Work Weather Wife
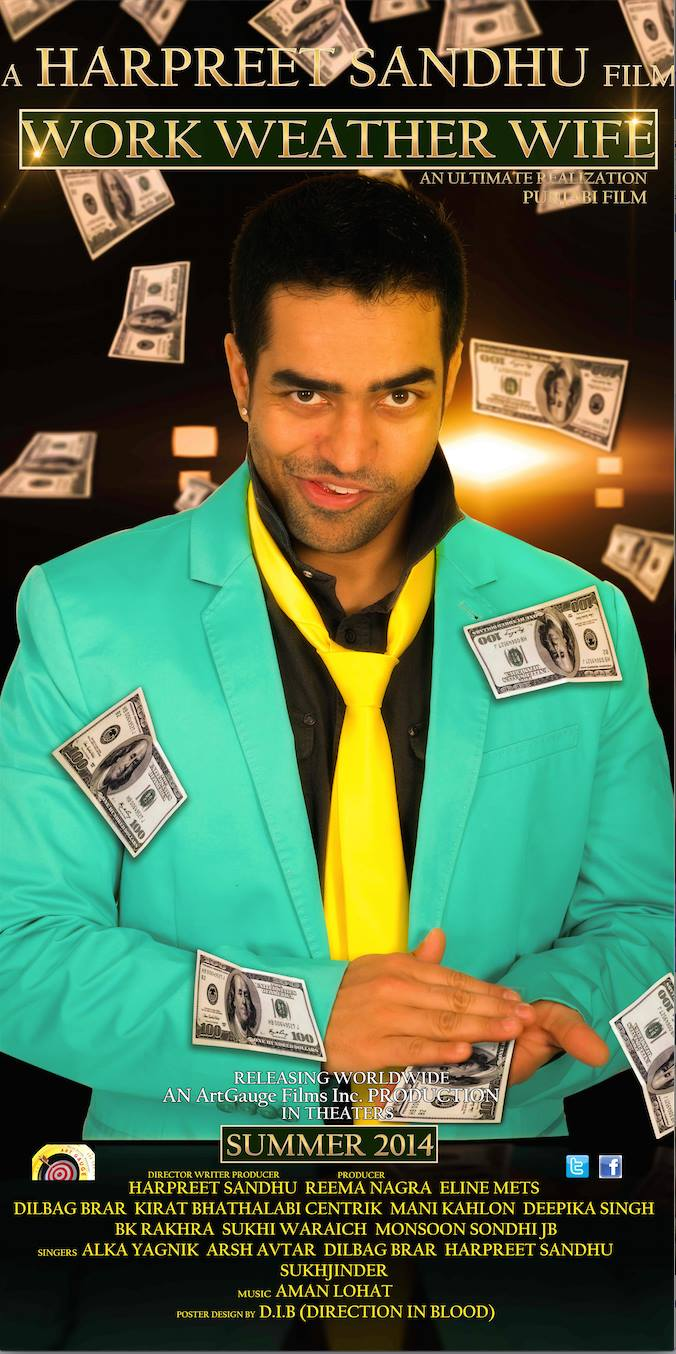

Soundtrack album by Harpreet Sandhu
- Released: 15 August 2014
- Recorded: ArtGauge Films Inc.
- Genre: Hindi Film Soundtrack
- Label: ArtGauge Films Inc.
- Producer: Harpreet Sandhu, Reema Nagra

The soundtrack features ten songs composed by Harpreet Sandhu, Dilbag Brar and Sukhjinder Alfaaz with lyrics by Dilbag Brar and Sukhjinder Alfaaz and voice rendered by Alka Yagnik, Arsh Avtar, Sukhjinder Alfaaz, Dilbag Brar, and Urdu poetry by Harpreet Sandhu.

No.	Title	Singers	Length
1.	"Wahgan Hawaawan"	Harpreet Sandhu, Dilbag Brar	4:00
2.	"Bewafa"	Sukhjinder Alfaaz	4:55
3.	"Chann, (English title "Moon")"	Alka Yagnik, Arsh Avtar	7:20
4.	"Jugni"	Dilbag Brar	5:57
5.	"Jugni Sad"	Dilbag Brar	1:50
6.	"Pyar De 1"	Dilbag Brar	3:41
7.	"Pyar De 2"	Dilbag Brar	2:57
8.	"Zamane Musical"	Harpreet Sandhu	3:05
9.	"Lambi Gutt (English title "Long Braid")"	Dilbag Brar	3:22
10.	"Dil"	Sukhjinder Alfaaz	3:54
