= Maya Darpan =

- Film poster.
- Directed by: Kumar Shahani
- Written by: Nirmal Verma (story); Kumar Shahani (screenplay)
- Produced by: NFDC
- Starring: Aditi; Anil Pandya; Kanta Vyas; Iqbalnath Kaul
- Cinematography: K. K. Mahajan
- Edited by: Madhu Sinha
- Music by: Bhaskar Chandavarkar
- Release date: 1972
- Running time: 107 minutes
- Country: India
- Language: Hindi

Maya Darpan (transl. the illusory mirror) is a 1972 Indian Hindi-language film directed by Kumar Shahani. It is a significant work of the Indian Parallel Cinema movement which started during the 1950s with filmmakers Satyajit Ray, Mrinal Sen and Ritwik Ghatak. The film was forgotten soon after its release, but was rediscovered and is today considered a landmark work of Indian cinema. The film stars Aditi and Anil Pandya.

== Synopsis ==
The film is set in a provincial town in Northern India, at a time following the nation's independence in 1947 when India was yet to be completely integrated as a political entity and when Nehruvian socialism was about to take on the existing feudal hierarchy.

Taran (Aditi) is the daughter of a wealthy landlord (Iqbalnath Kaul) and lives with her father and her widowed aunt (Kanta Vyas) in their ancestral mansion (which goes on to represent the whole of upper class in the film). The town is witnessing protests by newly formed labour unions which are partly being politically educated by the local railroad engineer (Anil Pandya), who seems to have an unspoken romantic relationship with Taran. Taran's unseen brother, who had, to the chagrin of their father, renounced his class privileges and gone off to an Assamese tea estate, asks Taran to join him. Stuck in a stifling patriarchal order, with pressure to marry an upper-class groom mounting, Taran decides to talk to her father about her plans.

== Cast ==
- Aditi
- Anil Pandya
- Kanta Vyas
- Iqbalnath Kaul

== Soundtrack ==
1. "Aaja Ri Nindiya" - Vani Jairam

== Rediscovery and Appreciation ==
After its original release in 1972, Maya Darpan won the Filmfare Award for Critic's Choice Best Film, but was quickly forgotten soon after.

In an interview with Shahani, Rafique Bhagdadi and Rajiv Rao reveal the initial reaction to the film: "Despite the lavish praise it received abroad, Maya Darpan (1972) met with hostile reception in India. Critics panned it for its excessively languid pace. Others found the film to be too European in its sensibility. Those who expected poverty of metaphysics were disappointed."

The film was rediscovered through independent film enthusiasts in India dedicated to bringing Indian Parallel Cinema to the forefront of serious critical artistic discussion. The movie found a revival amongst film enthusiasts. A film blog, The Seventh Art, stated that "We are now at a point where even the original negatives of the film face the risk of extinction. One can only hope that institutions like the World Cinema Foundation will do something about it. Kumar Shahani's Maya Darpan is a seminal work in Indian Parallel Cinema not just because it canvasses critical social issues (a facet that, more or less, in hindsight, has become a characteristic of the movement) but also because it attempts to seek out a new aesthetic, which does not try to straddle mainstream cinema and art cinema, to do that."
