= Kumar Shahani =

Indian film director and screenwriter (1940–2024)

- Born: 7 December 1940; Larkana, Sind Province, British India
- Died: 24 February 2024 (aged 83); Kolkata, West Bengal, India
- Occupations: Film director, film academic, visual artist
- Known for: Maya Darpan, Tarang, Khayal Gatha, Kasba

Kumar Shahani (7 December 1940 – 24 February 2024) was an Indian film director and screenwriter, best known for his parallel cinema films Maya Darpan (1972), Tarang (1984), Khayal Gatha (1989) and Kasba (1990). His films won the Filmfare Critics Award for Best Film in 1972, 1990 and 1991. Due to his dedication to formalism, and the reputation of his first feature—Maya Darpan being considered among Indian cinema's first formalist films—critics and film enthusiasts often associated him with filmmakers such as Pier Paolo Pasolini, Andrei Tarkovsky and Jacques Rivette. He was also known as a teacher at his alma mater, the Film and Television Institute of India, and as a theorist of cinema. His book of 51 essays Kumar Shahani: The Shock of Desire and Other Essays, was edited by Ashish Rajadhyaksha and published by Tulika Books in 2015.

== Early life ==
Shahani was born on 7 December 1940, in Larkana, Sindh (now in Pakistan). After the partition of India in 1947, Shahani's family shifted to the city of Bombay (now Mumbai). He attended the University of Bombay to obtain an undergraduate degree in political science and history, and studied advanced direction and screenplay writing at the Film and Television Institute of India in Pune, where he was a student of Ritwik Ghatak. He also studied with Damodar Dharmananda Kosambi. On a French government scholarship, he moved to France to further his studies at the Institut des hautes études cinématographiques (IDHEC) and assisted Robert Bresson on Une Femme Douce.

== Career ==
After returning to India, Shahani made his first feature film Maya Darpan in 1972. He received funding twelve years later to make his next full-length feature film, Tarang, in 1984. His other landmark films included the 1989 film Khayal Gatha and the 1990 film Kasba. He also made the short films Rails for the World, Fire in the Belly, Our Universe and Var Var Vari, the documentary Bhavantarana and Char Adhyay. His films won the Filmfare Critics Award for Best Film in 1972, 1990 and 1991. Maya Darpan won the National Film Award for Best Feature Film in Hindi in 1972. His films often appeared at the International Film Festival Rotterdam. Khayal Gatha won the FIPRESCI Prize at Rotterdam in 1990. He received the Prince Claus Award in 1998.

From 1976 to 1978, he held a Homi Bhabha Fellowship to study the epic tradition of the Mahābhārata, Buddhist iconography, Indian classical music and the Bhakti movement. Shahani was also involved with India's archiving and restoration initiative, the Film Heritage Foundation. He taught at the Film and Television Institute of India. His book of 51 essays, Kumar Shahani: The Shock of Desire and Other Essays, was published by Tulika Books in 2015. The essays were written over a 40-year period.

== Influences ==
Shahani considered Roberto Rossellini and Robert Bresson as major influences on his work and those from whom he learned the most. When comparing the two, he stated:

There is austerity in Bresson. But there is a possibility in cinema to have both: austerity and ornamentation. In Bresson, there is mainly austerity even though he aspires to have spectacle. When I work along those lines, I want the ornamentation to stand out. The magic of that reality must appear and we ought to allow that to happen. The notion of ornamentation that we have in India, the alankar, of how we play with it, that is something I like to retain in my work. And this is not there either in Rossellini's work or Bresson's in the works of Catholic filmmakers. When they move towards austerity, they really move towards it: Bresson in the tradition of St Augustine and Rossellini more in the manner of notational narratives.

For his film Tarang, which dealt with labour issues, Shahani mentioned that he consciously tried to avoid 'repeating' or 'imitating' one of his favourite films: Sergei Eisenstein's Battleship Potemkin. Shahani stated:

[F]or Tarang for instance, I was shooting a strike sequence. It was an obvious point where one could have quoted Eisenstein. Most filmmakers in such a situation would do so, inadvertently and unconsciously. Even the most "bourgeois" filmmakers as it were, the most commercial ones, or their exact opposites, would all do that. That is why one should remember him, to remember what he did and not to repeat it. So I remembered him while I was shooting that sequence, constantly like a prayer. We can't help saying that Eisenstein did it such a way and let only him do like that. That is why I feel very happy with that particular sequence in Tarang. It doesn't have, in any sense, an imitation of Eisenstein.

Shahani was also influenced by Ritwik Ghatak.

== Death ==
Shahani died in Kolkata, West Bengal on 24 February 2024, at the age of 83. He was survived by his wife and daughters Uttara and Rewati and his partner Rimli Bhattacharya.

== Filmography ==
Year	Film	Notes
1966	The Glass Pane	b/w, 35mm, 10 min. Graduation film. FTII.
1967	Manmad Passenger	b/w, 35mm, 15 min. Short film. FTII.
1967	A Certain Childhood	(English and Gujarati). b/w, 35mm, 22 min. Documentary for Directorate of Films, Gujarat, India.
1970	Rails for the World	35mm, 20 min. Technicolor, Documentary made for Steel Authority of India Ltd. (SAIL)
1971	Object	16mm, 10 min. Kodachrome, Short film made in collaboration with the psychoanalyst Udayan Patel.
1972	Maya Darpan	(Hindi) 35mm, 100 min. Feature. NFDC. Winner Filmfare Award – Best Film (Critics); National Film Award for Best Feature Film in Hindi
1973	Fire in the Belly	(English). b/w, 35mm, Documentary made for Films Division, India.
1976	Our Universe	(English). b/w, 16mm, Educational film
1983	A Memoir of the Future	(English). 35mm (incomplete). Film made on the work of British psychoanalyst W.R. Bion
1983	Rules of the Game	35mm, Documentary (censored but not released), made for Films Division.
1984	Tarang	(Hindi). 35mm, Cinemascope, Feature produced by NFDC. National Film Award – Special Jury Award (Certificate)
1988	Var Var Vari	(Hindi). b/w, 35mm, 29 min, produced by the Film & Television Institute of India
1988	A Ship Aground	(English). 16mm, Short film.
1989	Khayal Gatha	(Hindi) 35 mm Winner Filmfare Award – Best Film (Critics); Winner FIPRESCI Prize – Rotterdam International Film Festival
1991	Kasba	(Hindi) 35 mm, produced by NFDC. Winner Filmfare Award – Best Film (Critics)
1991	Bhavantarana	(Oriya) film about Guru Kelucharan Mahapatra; National Film Award for Best Biographical Film
1997	Char Adhyay	(Hindi and Bengali) film based on Rabindranath Tagore's novel produced by NFDC
2000	Bamboo Flute/Biraha bhariyo ghar angan kone	(Hindi and Tamil) film produced by the Ministry of External Affairs
2004	As the Crow Flies	Film based on the artist Akbar Padamsee
2007	Chhapakhana	(Bengali) short film made at Satyajit Ray Film & Television Institute
2009	Priye Charushile	(Oriya and Italian), feature documentary, completed but unreleased

== Awards ==
- National Award (1972, 1984, 1991)
- Filmfare Critics Awards – Best Film (1972, 1990, 1991)
- The International Film Festival of Rotterdam – FIPRESCI Award (1990)
- Prince Claus Award (1998)
