= Amal Allana =

Indian director and designer (born 1947)

- Born: 14 September 1947 (age 79); Mumbai
- Education: National School of Drama
- Occupations: Theatre director, educator
- Years active: 1970–present
- Spouse: Nissar Allana
- Children: Zuleikha Chaudhuri
- Father: Ebrahim Alkazi
- Awards: Sangeet Natak Akademi Award (1998)

Amal Allana (born 14 September 1947) is an Indian theatre director, scenic designer and costume designer and presently she is in her second consecutive term as the Chairperson of National School of Drama, India's premier institute of Theatre training, she also runs the Dramatic Art and Design Academy in New Delhi, with her husband Nissar Allana, which they co-founded in 2000.

As a theatre director, she has directed over 55 plays in Hindi, including notable plays like, Aadhe Adhure (Mohan Rakesh), Khamosh, Adalat Jari Hai (Vijay Tendulkar adaptation of 1956 short-story, 'Die Panne' (Traps) by Friedrich Dürrenmatt), Ashadh Ka Ek Din (Mohan Rakesh), Tughlaq and Hayavadana (both by Girish Karnad), Mahabhoj (Mannu Bhandari) (1982), King Lear, Himmat Mai (Mother Courage), Nati Binodini (2006) and Begum Barve (Satish Alekar), many of which are known to have set trends in Indian theatre.

She was awarded the 1998 Sangeet Natak Akademi Award in Direction, given by Sangeet Natak Akademi, India's National Academy for Music, Dance and Drama.

== Early life and education ==
Born in 1947 in Mumbai to Ebrahim Alkazi, noted theatre director and the first director of the National School of Drama; while her father was of Arab descent (of Saudi Arabian and Kuwaiti parentage), her mother Roshan Alkazi, belonged to the Gujarati Ismail Khoja community and did the costumes for almost all of her father's plays. Her father was one amongst nine siblings; in 1947, Amal's paternal relatives migrated to Pakistan while her father stayed behind in India. She grew up in a household steeped in theatre and overlooked by her grandmother, a staunch Gandhian, and frequented by artists, writers and theatre personalities, further home was where her father did most of his play rehearsals. Incidentally, theatre director Alyque Padamsee is her maternal uncle, and her brother Feisal Alkazi is also a theatre director. After completing her schooling, she skipped college and straightaway joined the National School of Drama, Delhi as graduation was not a necessary qualification then. Here she studied under her father and graduated in 1968, majoring in Direction, and also winning the Girish Gosh Award for Best Director and the Bharat Purushkar for the best all-round student.

In 1969, she received a scholarship from the former GDR government to study the work of Bertolt Brecht. It allowed her to do a two-year apprenticeship at the Berliner Ensemble, Weimar German National Theatre, Volksbuehne, and the Deutsches Theater of East Germany. Making her a part of the generation of Indian theatre practitioners including, Habib Tanvir, Vijaya Mehta, and P.L. Deshpande, who had the first hand exposure to theatre of Brecht at the Berliner Ensemble, during the formative years of their career, and as with others, this too had a deep influence on her work as she later noted, "I'd seen Indian theatre as a foreigner, regional theatre as an outsider. Doing a course in East Germany helped me to put things together. Brecht helped me to understand Indian theatre objectively, analytically..". She also spent time studying at Kabuki and Noh in Japan.

== Career ==
After returning from Germany, one of her early plays was Teen takke ka swang (1970), in Urdu with Surekha Sikri, based on Brecht's Threepenny Opera, which she co-directed with Fritz Bennewitz for NSD Repertory Company, Delhi.

Her collaboration with her husband, Nissar Allana started in 1971, when she was rehearsing her first solo play as a director, Brecht's A Man's a Man at St. Xavier's College, Bombay (now Mumbai), that is when Nissar then studying medicine though impressed by Brecht and Casper Neher (Austrian-German scenographer), volunteered to do the sets. With Nissar handing stage craft, she has done over 55 production, many of them for their various theatre companies. First they set up, 'The Workshop' in Bombay (1972–1975), next when they moved to Delhi, they started Studio 1 (1977–1985), and in 1985 they founded Theatre and Television Associates.

She next taught in the Department of Indian Theatre, Panjab University, Chandigarh, where she served as its head, 1977–8. During this period, she directed important productions of Brecht's The Exception and the Rule in which Punjabi poet Manjit Tiwana, acted along with Anupam Kher and Anita Kanwar, as well as Three Penny Opera.

Her first major production came in 1976, when she did Mohan Rakesh's Adhe Adhure, with NSD Repertory and three actors trained by her father, Surekha Sikri, Uttara Baokar and Manohar Singh, which whom she went to work in several other plays of acclaim, including Himmat Mai (1993) based on Brecht's Mother Courage and her Children, Girish Karnad's Nagamandal, and in Satish Alekar's Begum Barve. Her other plays include, Birjis Qadar Ka Kunba (1980), based on Federico García Lorca's The House of Bernarda Alba Asadh Ka Ek Din (1981) (Mohan Rakesh), Mannu Bhandari's Mahabhoj (1982), Aurat bhali Ramkali (1984), based on Brecht's The Good Person of Szechwan, Rajajaswant Singh (1989), based on Shakespeare's King Lear, Prashant Dalvi's Char Chowgi, Mahesh Elkunchwar's Sonata and Innocent Erendira And Her Heartless Grandmother, based on a story by Gabriel García Márquez, transposed to Rajasthan. She has also directed television drama, notably Mohan Rakesh's Adhe-adhure, Begum Barve, Manjula Padmanabhan's Lights Out, Char Chaughi, Teen takke ka swang. Though her most talked about production has been Nati Binodini (2006), which she directed after discovering the autobiography of early 20th century, courtesan turned Bengali stage actress, Binodini Dasi, after two years of research, the result was a play which according to theatre critic, Romesh Chander was "her best production till date". In 1990 She also directed Mulla Nasiruddin based on life of Nasreddin Hodja.

The first ever all-Indian theatre festival, Bharat Rang Mahotsav 1999, opened on 18 March in New Delhi, with staging of Girish Karnad's play Nagamandala, which she directed. She founded Dramatic Art and Design Academy, situated at Khirkee Village, New Delhi, with her husband, Nissar Allana, a stage-set and lighting designer. Today she is Head of Acting there, while Nissar is the Director. In 2008, the academy started organising a 10-day 'Delhi Ibsen Festival', which featured plays directed by Ratan Thiyam, Anuradha Kapur and Neelam Mansingh. In 2009, the festival included four international productions, from China, Iran, Egypt and the Netherlands, apart from production of Henrik Ibsen's plays by Shantanu Bose, Jyotish M.G., Neeraj Kabi and Zulekha Chowdhury, while Amal Allana's production, Metropolis brought together the female leads from three of Ibsen's plays—A Doll's House, Rosmersholm and Hedda Gabler in a modern mosaic set against the backdrop of present-day Mumbai and the 26/11 terrorist attacks.

She has also worked as a set dresser in Richard Attenborough's Gandhi (1982) and costume designer in Mahesh Bhatt's Saransh (1984).

== Books ==
Allana is the author of the book Ebrahim Alkazi: Holding Time Captive, a biography of her father.

== Personal life ==
She is married to Nissar Allana, whom she first met at the age of 15 in her father Ebrahim Alkazi's theatre group. Allana though a doctor by profession, practices stage design and lighting design and has worked in most of her plays, he is also the Director of Dramatic Art and Design Academy, which they founded in 2000 in Delhi. Their daughter Zuleikha Chaudhary is also a theatre director.

Her mother, Roshan Alkazi died in 2007, and a year later two books titled, Ancient Indian Costume and Medieval Indian Costume, based on her research of Indian costume through the history were published by Amal and her father Ebrahim, released at Art Heritage Gallery which was founded Ebrahim and Roshan together.
