= Deewar Mein Ek Khirkee Rehti Thi =

Sahitya Academy Award winning book by Vinod Kumar Shukla

- Author: Vinod Kumar Shukla
- Language: Hindi
- Genre: Novel
- Publisher: Vani Prakashan
- Publication date: 1997
- Publication place: India
- Awards: Sahitya Akademi Award (1999)

Deewar Mein Ek Khirkee Rehti Thi (Hindi: दीवार में एक खिड़की रहती थी) is a Hindi novel by Indian writer Vinod Kumar Shukla. Published in 1997, the novel is among the well-known works of Shukla and is known for its simple yet imaginative narrative style, combining everyday life with poetic elements. The novel received the Sahitya Akademi Award for Hindi literature in 1999. It has been translated into English as A Window Lived in the Wall.

== Plot ==
The novel follows the life of Raghuvar Prasad, a mathematics teacher, and his wife Sonsi. The story explores human relationships, imagination and the experiences of ordinary middle-class life.

== Reception ==
The novel has been discussed in the context of modern Hindi literature. Critics have highlighted Vinod Kumar Shukla's distinctive writing style, including his use of simple language, imagination and poetic expression. In 2025, the novel gained further attention after publisher Hind Yugm awarded Vinod Kumar Shukla a royalty payment of ₹30 lakh for the book, an event that drew discussion in the Hindi literary and publishing community.
