= Mulla Nasiruddin =

Indian television series

- Written by: S. M. Mehdi
- Directed by: Amal Allana
- Starring: Raghubir Yadav
- Music by: Louis Banks
- Original language: Hindi

Original release
- Network: DD National
- Release: 1990

Mulla Nasruddin is a television programme on Doordarshan, which aired in 1990. The title role was played by Raghubir Yadav.

The episodes were based on stories of Nasreddin (Dastan-e-Nasruddin were credited in this show), a 13th-century wise man, whose wisdom can be found in folk tales from Turkey to China. The show was directed by Amal Allana, with music by Louis Banks and script by S.M. Mehdi.

== Cast ==
- Raghubir Yadav as Mullah Nasruddin
- Zohra Sehgal as Story Teller
- Manohar Singh as Mirza Lang
- Saurabh Shukla as a spy
- Vijay Kashyap as Amir
- Samina Mishra as Guljaan
- Mohd Ayub as Hasan
- Yusuf Hussain as Deputy Prime Minister
