= Rampara Kalibari =

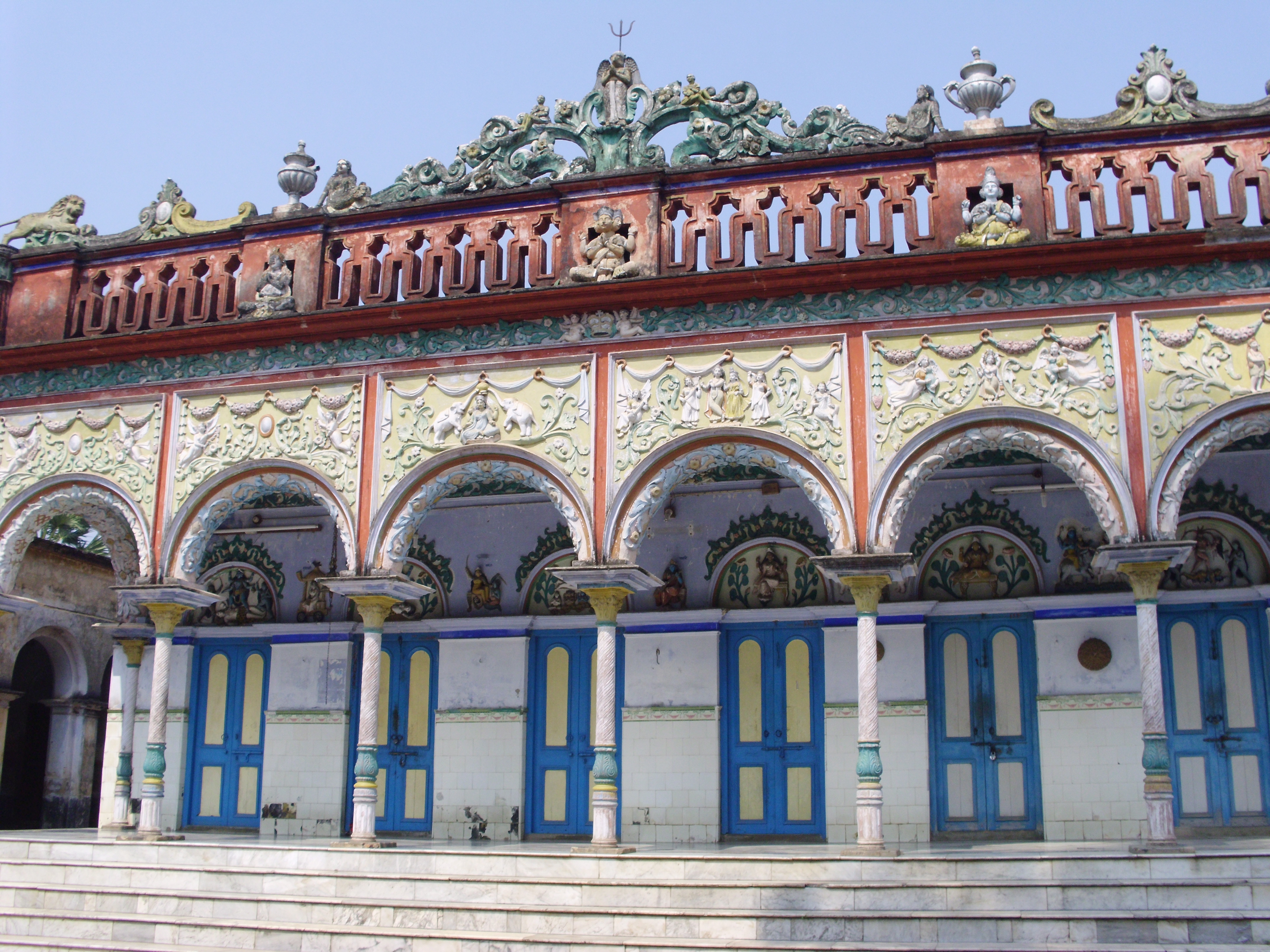

Religion
- Affiliation: Hinduism
- District: Hooghly
- Deity: Siddheshwari Kali
- Festivals: Kali Pooja, Durga Pooja

Location
- Location: Rampara
- State: West Bengal
- Country: India
- Interactive map of Rampara Kalibari

Architecture
- Type: Bengal architecture
- Creator: Nandy family
- Monument: 3

The Rampara Kalibari is a Hindu temple located in Rampara near Kolkata, just 35 km away from Kolkata. The presiding deity of the temple is Siddheshwari Kali, an aspect of Kali, Siddheshwar is the name of Lord Shiva, Siddheshwari is the feminine form of that. The temple was built by Nandy family of Rampara, great devotees of Goddess Kali. The temple is famous for its Kali pooja which is held on October/November during Diwali. Devotees from far villages and from other places reach there to seek the sight of the deity. It is said that the Wooden Kali idol is more than 500 years old.

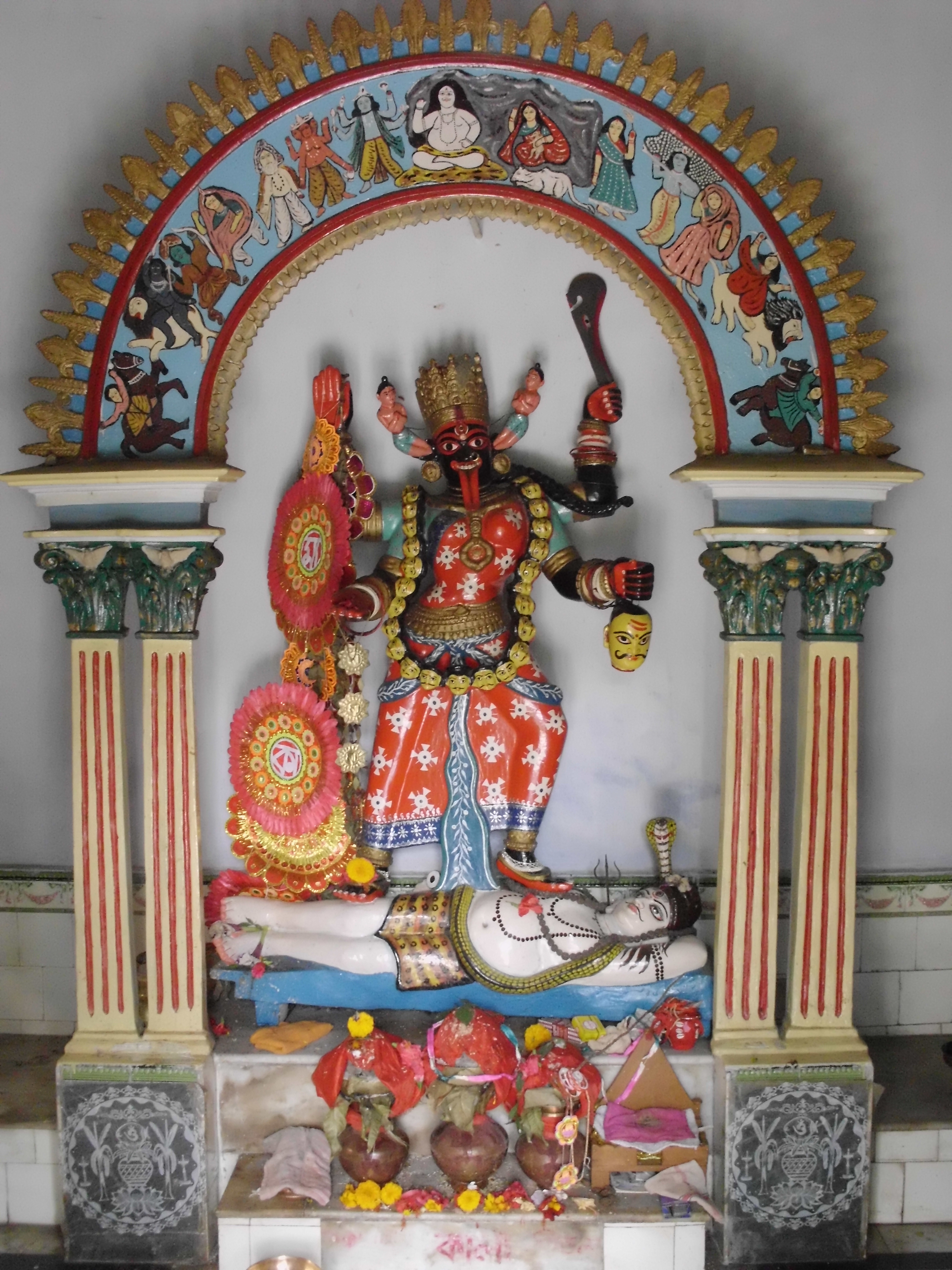
Goddess Kali

The temple compound contains a large courtyard surrounding the temple with a small garden, a Jagannath Temple, a Hall and the boundary walls. There are different rooms in the temple. The Goddess Kali is enshrined in the first room, with another deity, Panchanan, just beside her, sharing the same room. The temple has its own residential area just attached to its boundary, which belongs to the Nandy family. The Utensils and the Pooja Samagri of the temple are kept in the sacristy, other rooms of the temple. There is a Pond associated with the temple just nearby it. The temple also has a Rath, which is taken out during the Rath Yatra on the occasion of Jagannath Pooja.

== History ==
It is said that the fore father of Late Madhusudan Nandy had built the temple which was later rebuilt and subsequently developed by his sons Late Phakir Chandra Nandy, Late Surendra Nath Nandy and Late Gosto Behari Nandy, who were descendants of Nandy Family. Presently daily Puja rituals and maintenance are carried out by their present generation.

The Rampara Kalibari was founded long back by the Nandy family. They had a great faith in Goddess Kali, so they decided to build a temple for the deity for the prosperity and happiness of the people of Rampara and the surrounding villages. The belief of the people in the Goddess was so strong that this is one of the most powerful temples of that region now.

== Architecture ==
Built in the traditional style of Bengal architecture with many rooms, where one of the room is shared by the Goddess Kali with the Deity Panchanan. It is said that the initial temple was built more than 300 years ago and it was rebuilt in early 20th century and that some of its artisans involved were members who built Victoria Memorial.A separate room is built for the Jagannath-Subhadra-Balaram in the temple premises. And a hall is also included in the premises for any occasional purpose. The temple's courtyard is used for any auspicious function which is held at the temple premises.

== Gallery ==
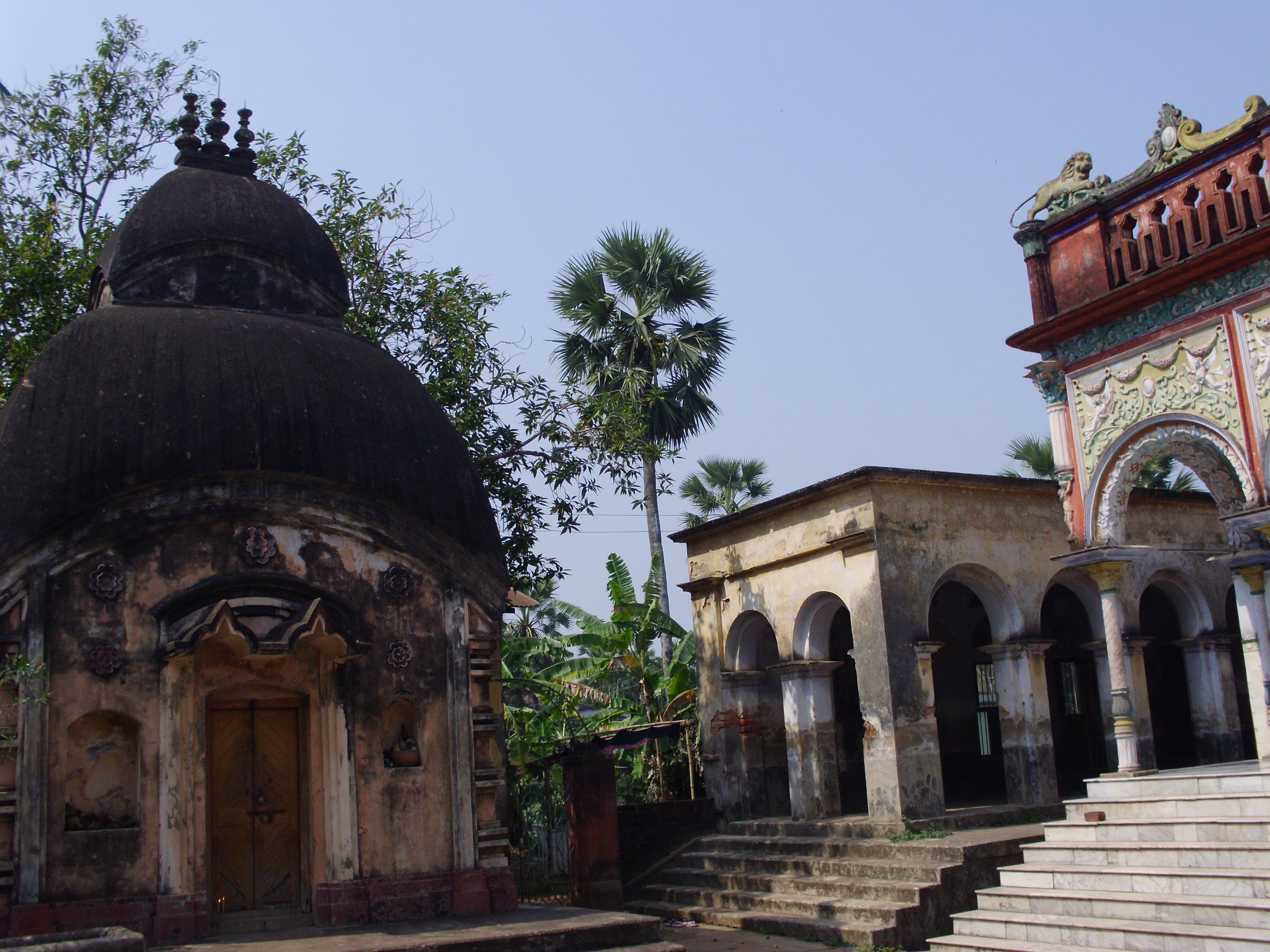
The Temple premises

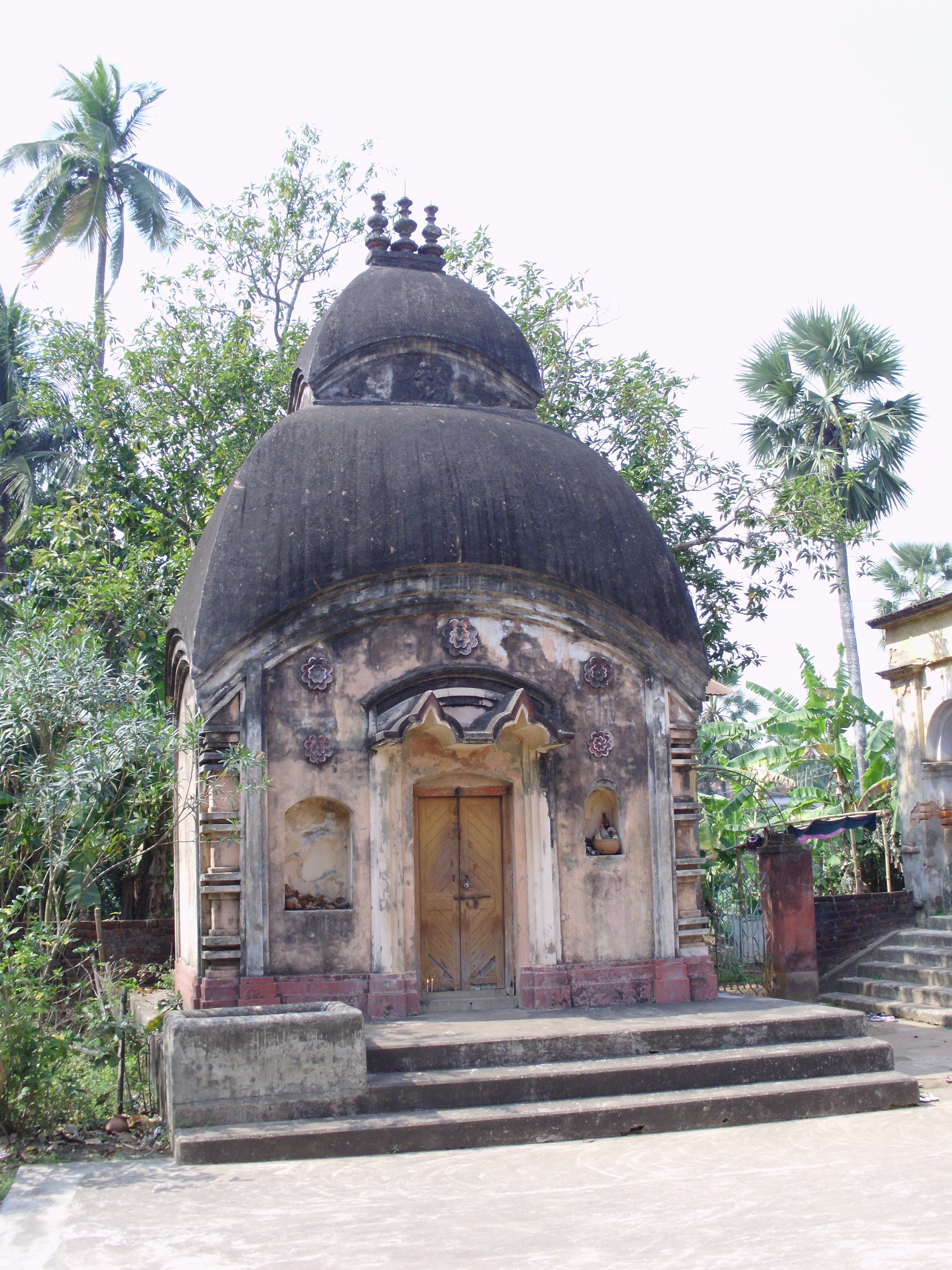
Jagannath temple

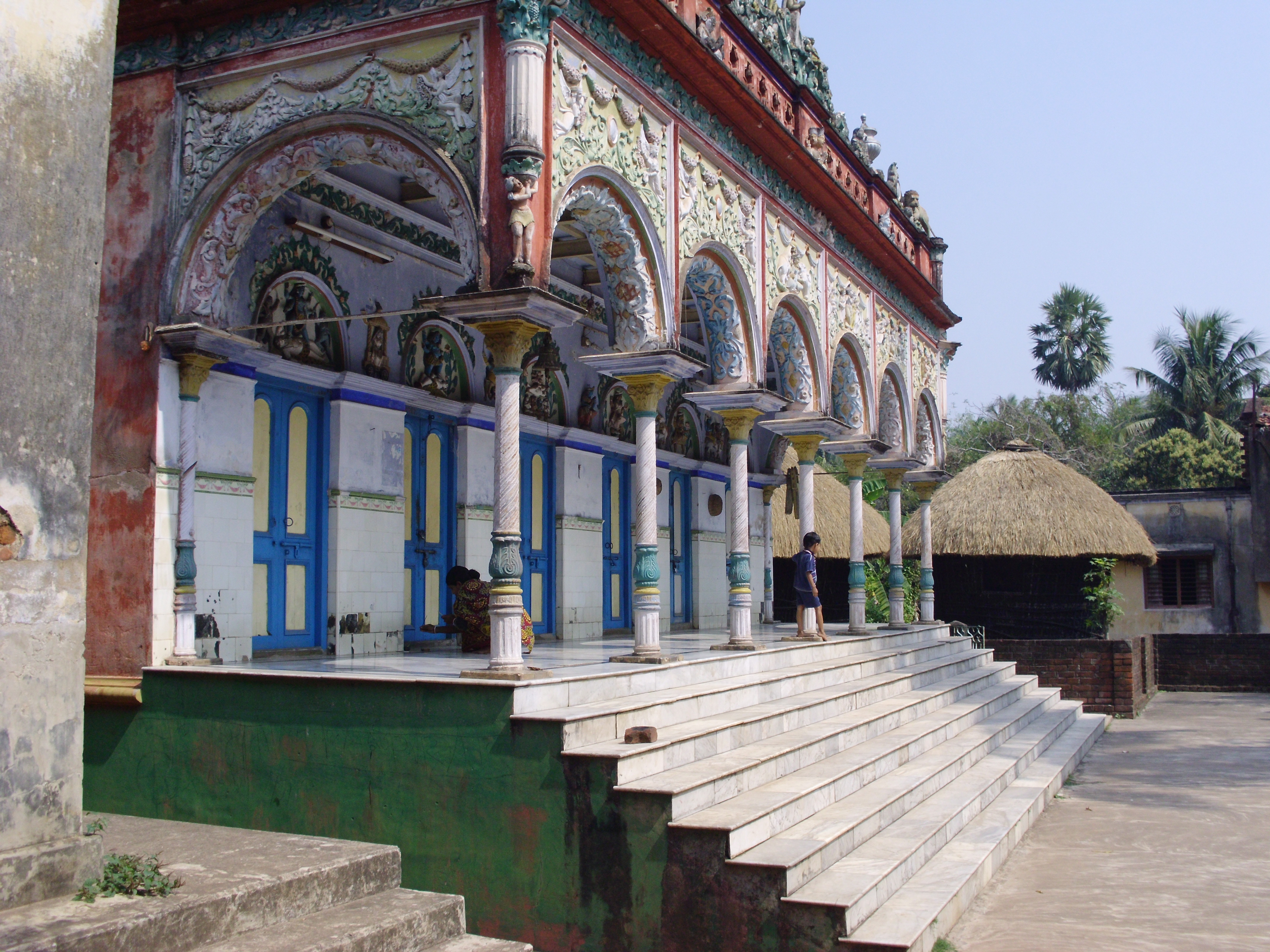
Side view of the temple

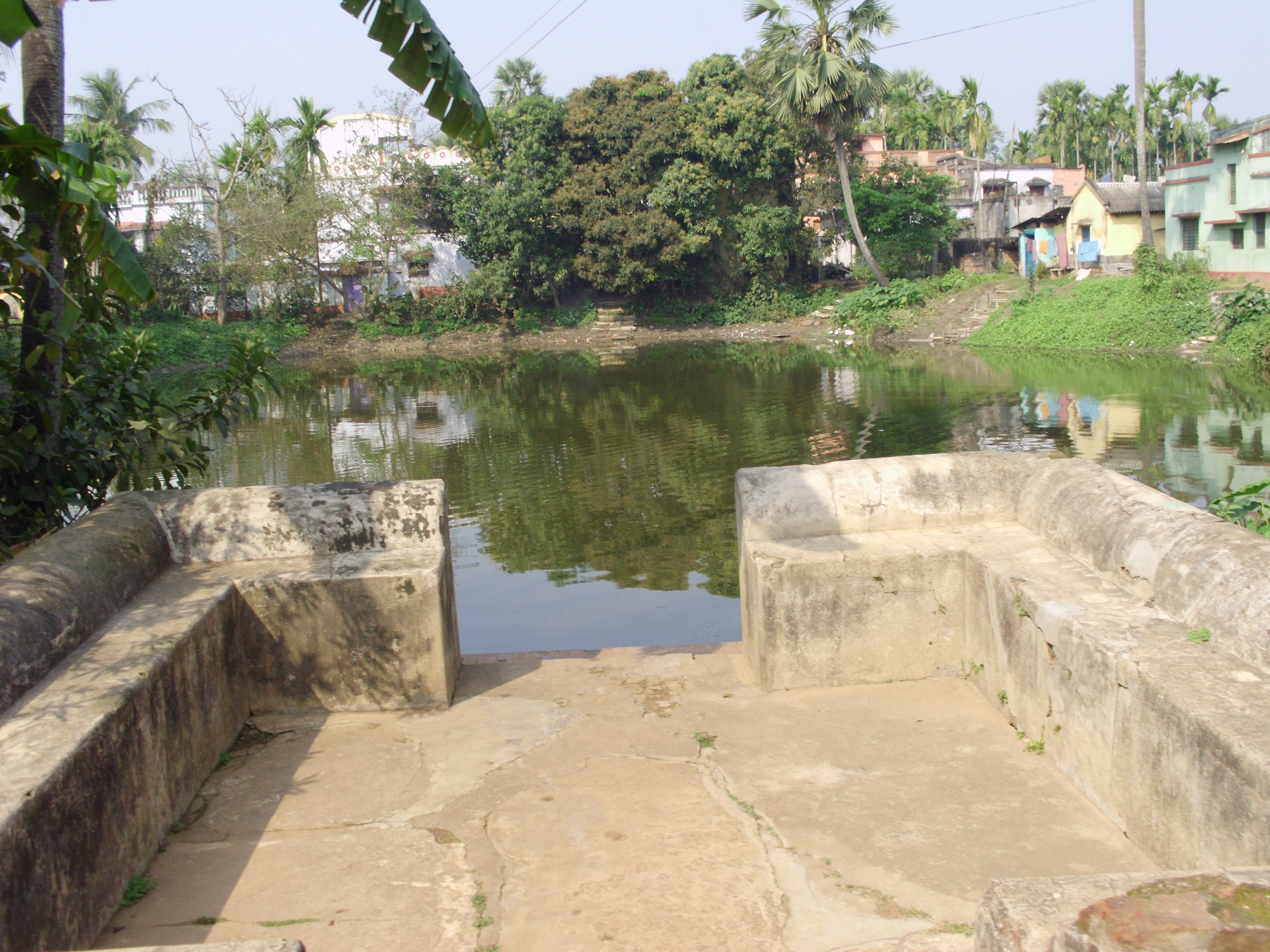
The pond of the temple

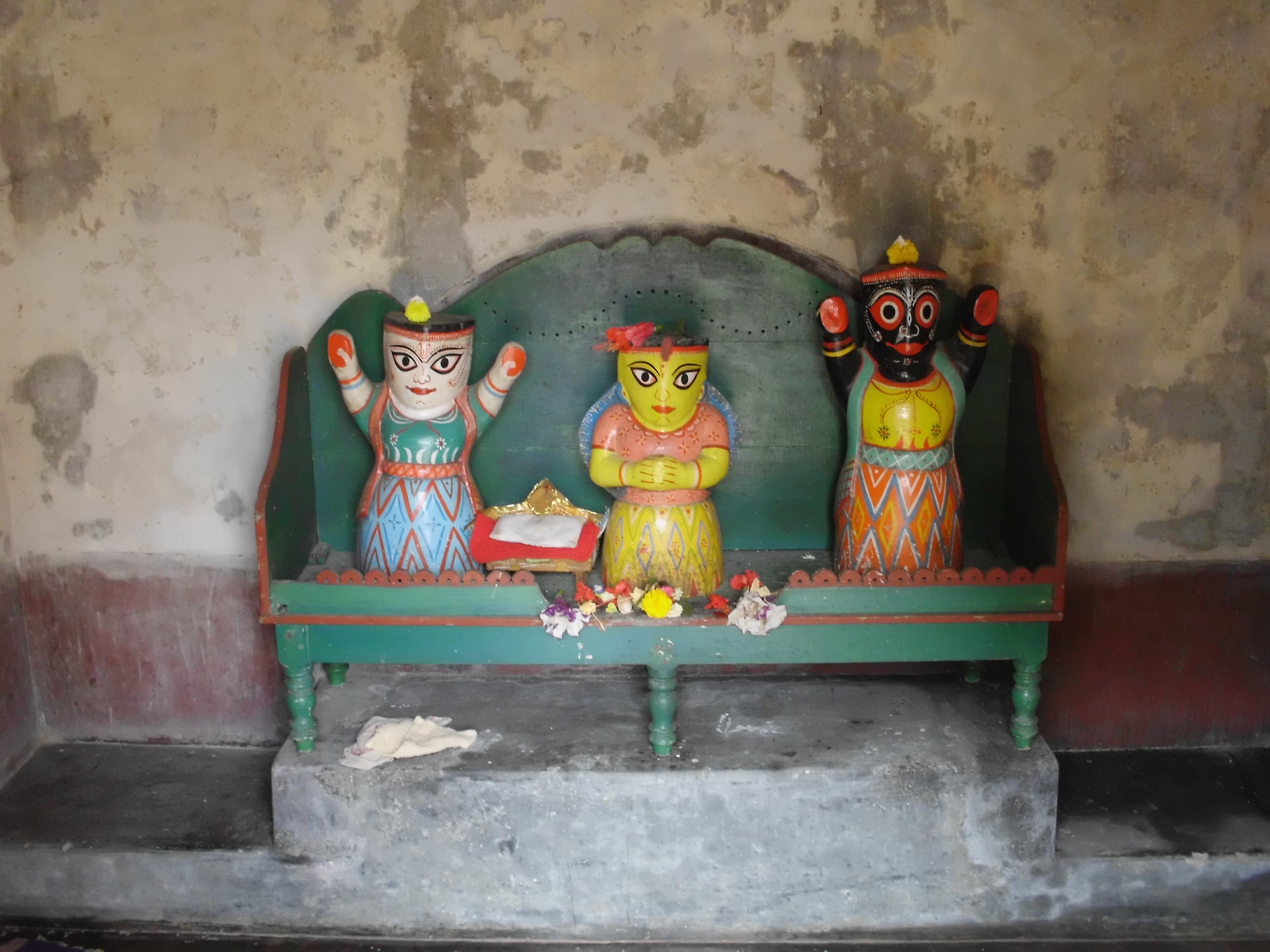
Jagannath-Subhadra-Balaram

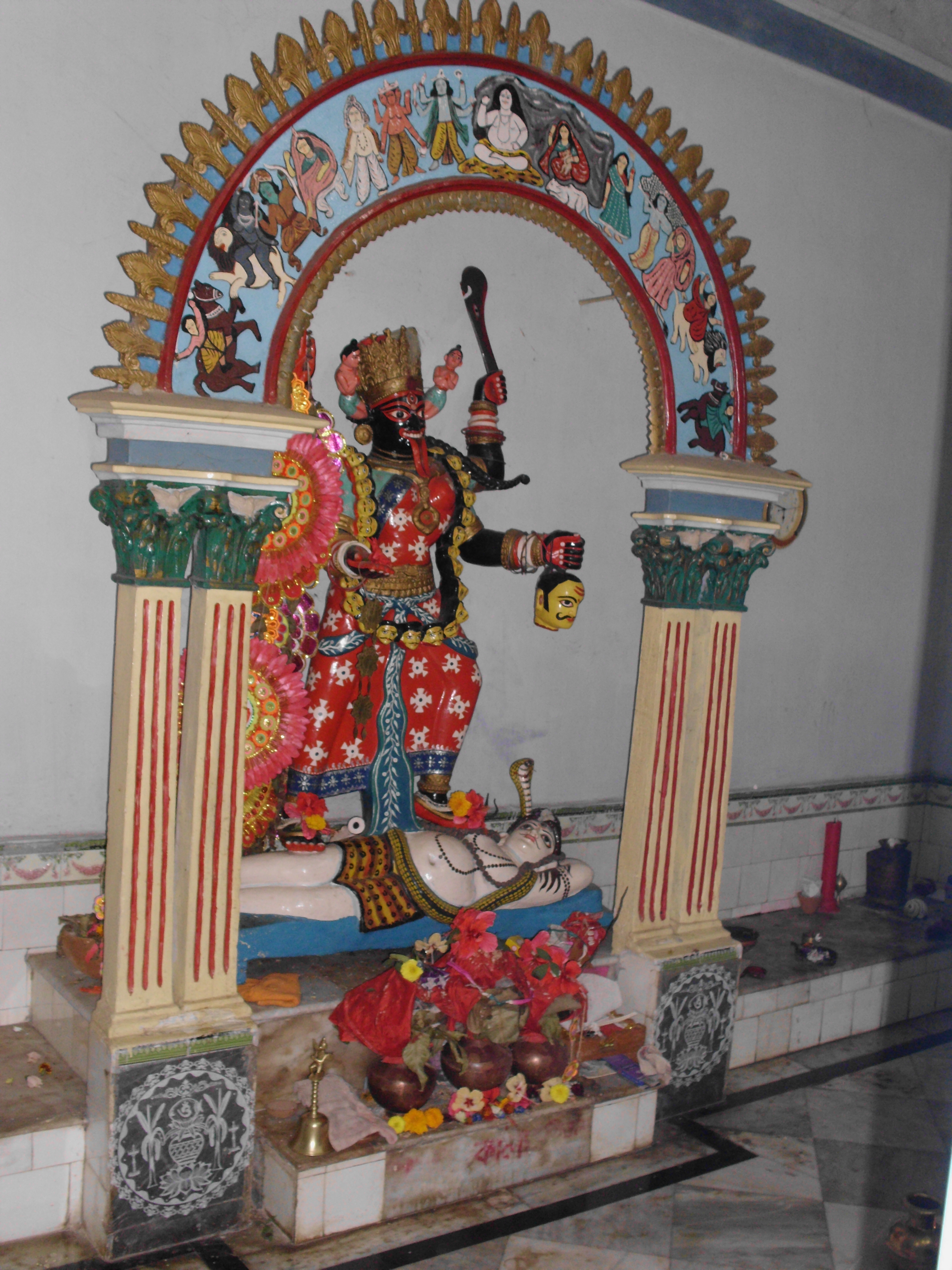
Side view of the deity

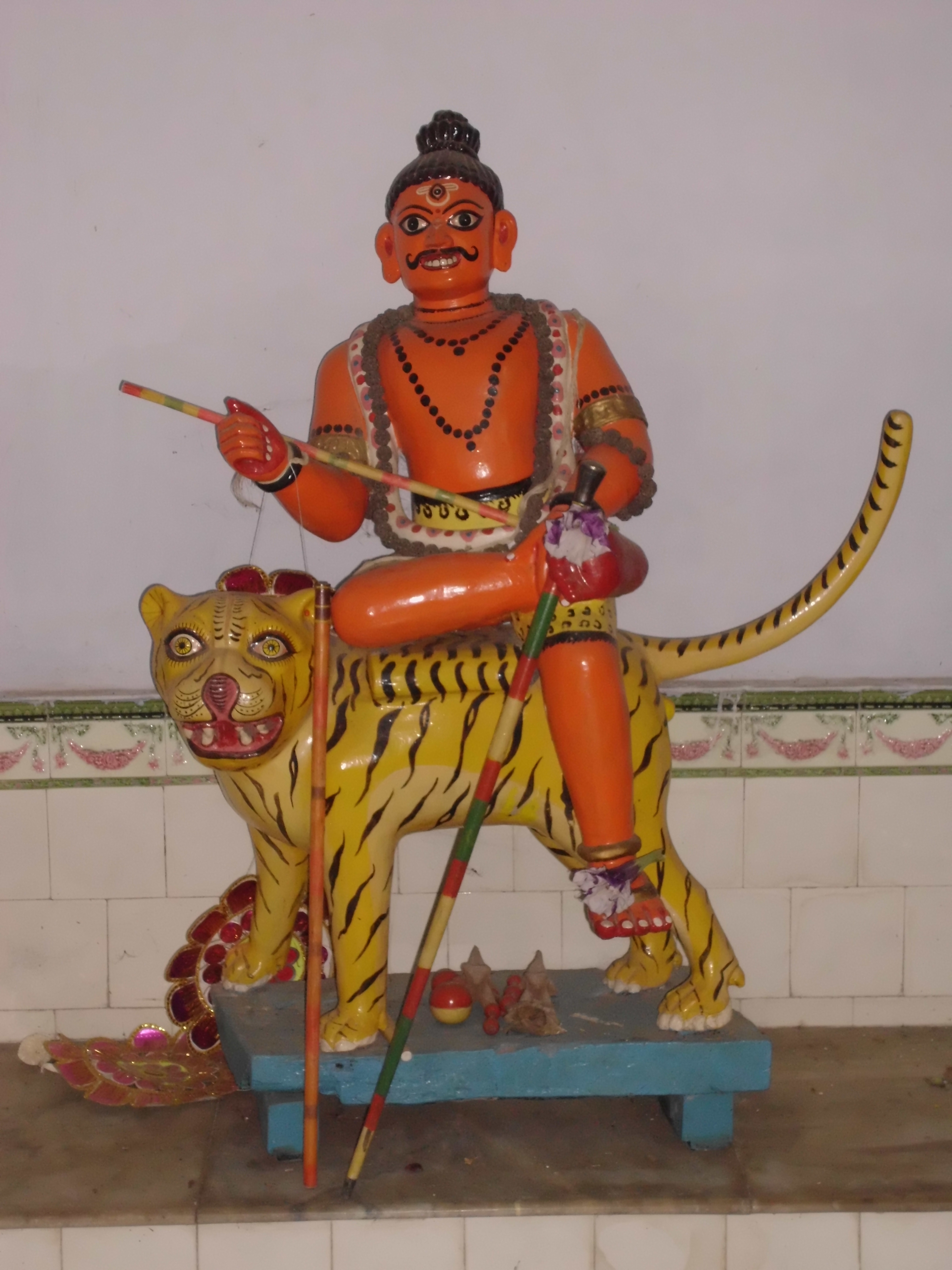
Panchanan

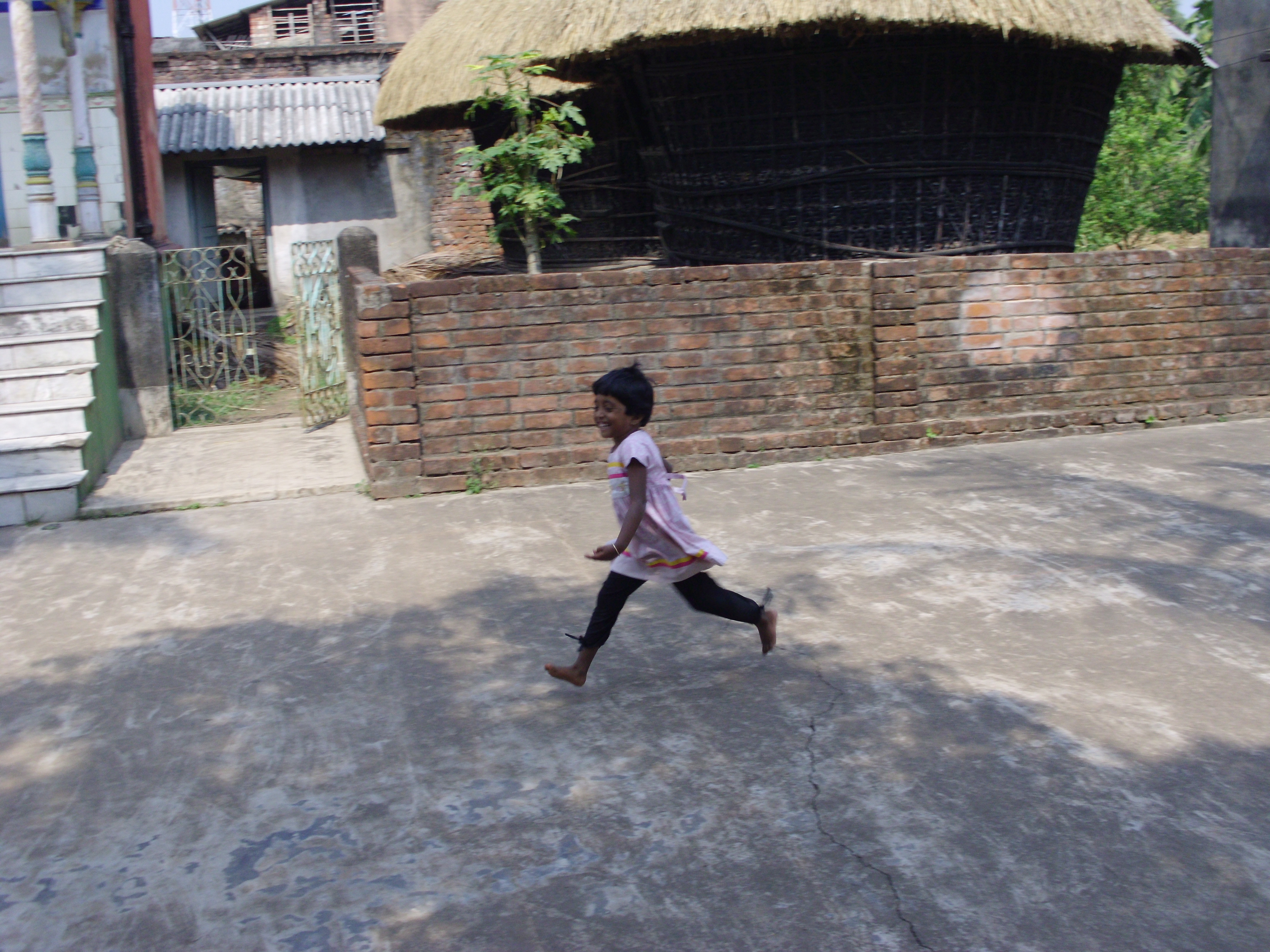
A little girl playing at the courtyard

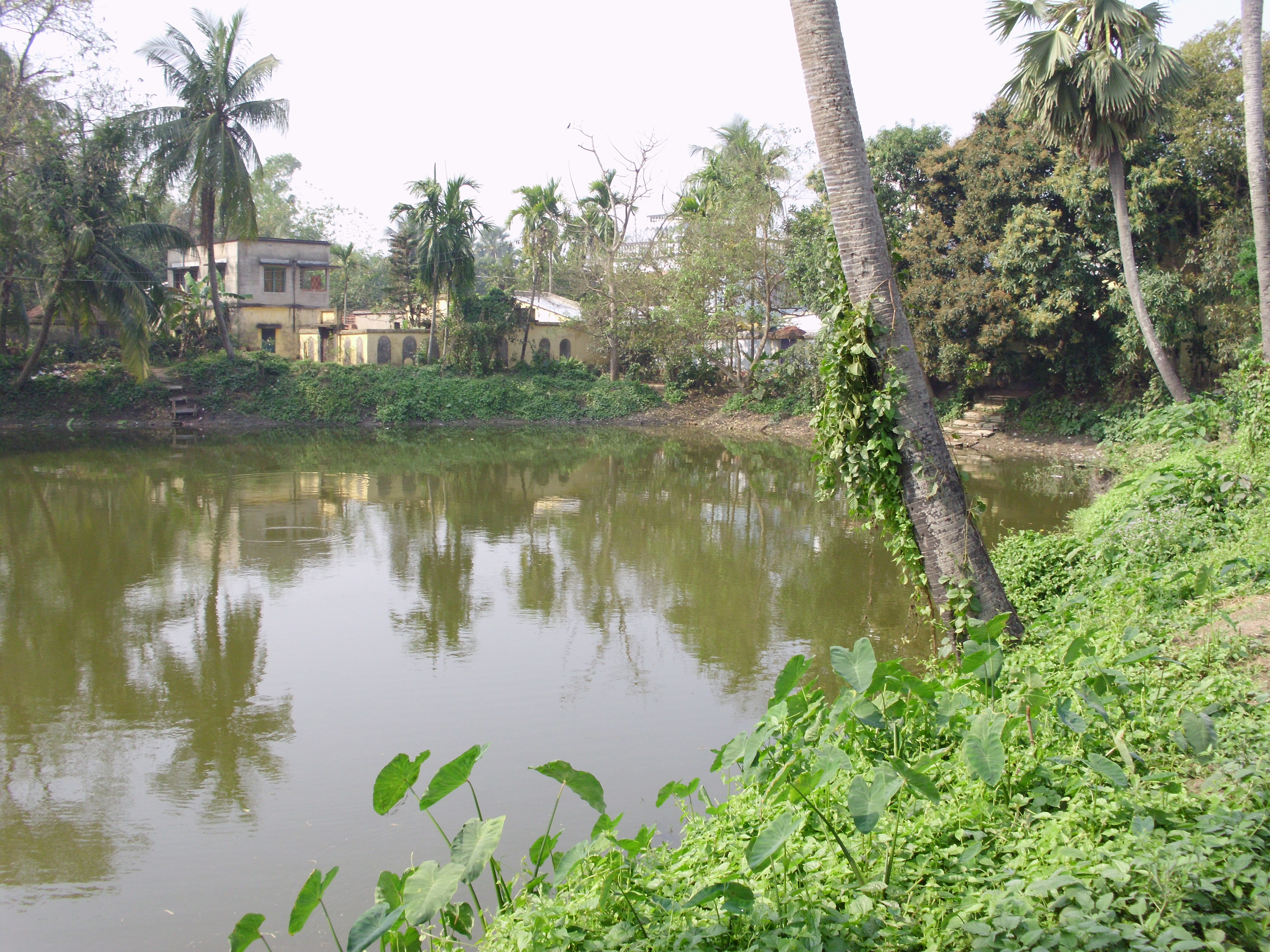
Side view of the lake

== See also ==
- Belur Math
- Dakshineswar Kali Temple
