= Ashadh Ka Ek Din (film) =

- Directed by: Mani Kaul
- Written by: Mohan Rakesh
- Starring: Rekha Sabnis; Arun Khopkar; Om Shivpuri
- Cinematography: K. K. Mahajan
- Music by: Jaidev
- Release date: 1971
- Running time: 114 minutes
- Country: India
- Language: Hindi

Ashadh Ka Ek Din (transl. A Day of Ashadh, English title: One Day Before the Rainy Season) is a 1971 Hindi film based on play of the same name by Mohan Rakesh. The film was directed by Mani Kaul starring Rekha Sabnis, Arun Khopkar and Om Shivpuri.

The film's story as in play is centered on a love triangle between Sanskrit poet Kalidas, Mallika and Priyangmanjari.

It went on to win Filmfare Critics Award for Best Movie in India.

== Cast ==
- Rekha Sabnis as Mallika
- Arun Khopkar as Kalidasa/Dev Matrugupt
- Om Shivpuri as Vilom
- Uma Sahaay as Ambika
- Anuradha Kapur as Princess Priyangmamjari
- Pinchu Kapoor as Matul
- Hemant Bose
- Sharma
- Vishnu Mathur
