= Hind Yugm =

Indian publishing house

- Founded: 2010
- Headquarters location: Noida, Uttar Pradesh

Hind Yugm is an independent Hindi-language publishing house based in Noida, Uttar Pradesh, India. The organization functions both as a publisher as well and a literary platform, organizing events and discussions aimed at popularizing the evolution of Hindi expression.

== Background ==
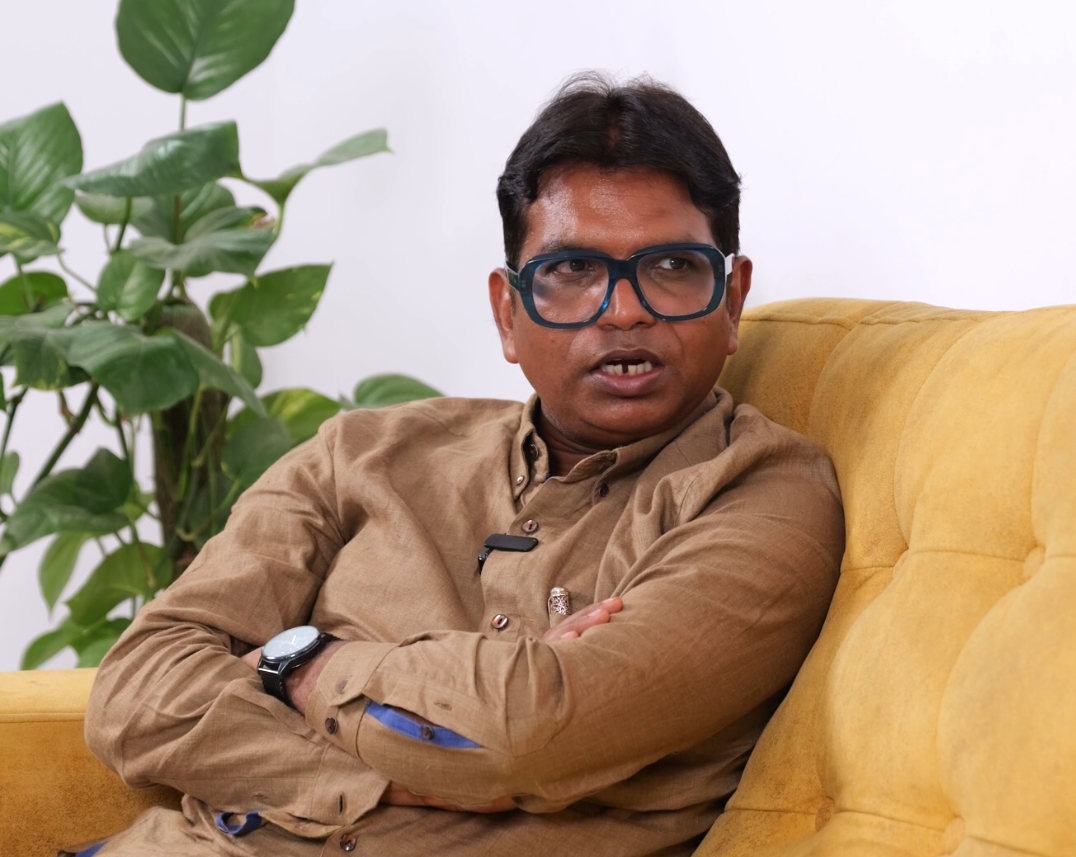
Shailesh Bharatwasi, founding editor

Established in 2010 by founding editor Shailesh Bharatwasi, the publishing house seeks to integrate traditional publishing practices with newer forms of marketing. Its editorial list includes contemporary fiction, poetry and revised editions of twentieth century works by established authors.

== Publications ==
Title	Author
Masala Chai	Divya Prakash Dubey
Musafir Cafe	divya prakash dubey
October Junction	Divya Prakash Dubey
Namak Swadanusar	Nikhil Sachan
Zindagi Aais Pais	Nikhil Sachan
Banaras Talkies	Satya Vyas
Dilli Darbaar	Satya Vyas
Ghar Wapsi	Ajeet Bharti
Dark Horse: Ek Ankahi Dastaan	Nilotpal Mrinal
Tumhare Baare Mein	Manav Kaul
Parag Aur Pankhudiyan	Seema Kumar
Paal Le Ik Rog Nadaan	Gautam Rajrishi
Balushahi	Manish Kumar
Jaun Elia: Ek Ajab Gazab Shayar	Jaun Elia
Mere Donon Banaras	Saurabh Bhuwania
Cheeni Mitti	Ran Vijay
Kewal Jadein Hain	Vinod Kumar Shukla
Rajdhani Express Via Ummidpur Halt	Sunil Kumar Jha
Kuch Karwatein Aisi	Kunal Kushwaha
Stree Mein Samudra	Surendra Raghuwanshi
Patjhad	Manav Kaul
Katranein	Manav Kaul
Darling Democracy	Nilotpal Mrinal
Mann Vichitra Buddhi Charitra	Sushma Gupta
Sanyam	Manav Kaul
Deewar Mein Ek Khidki Rehti Thi	Vinod Kumar Shukla
Aughad	Nilotpal Mrinal
Yaar Jaadugar	Nilotpal Mrinal
