= PEN/Nabokov Award =

Writing award

The PEN/Nabokov Award for Achievement in International Literature, commonly referred to as the PEN/Nabokov Award, is awarded biennially by PEN America (formerly PEN American Center) to writers, principally novelists, "whose works evoke to some measure Nabokov's brilliant versatility and commitment to literature as a search for the deepest truth and the highest pleasure— what Nabokov called the 'indescribable tingle of the spine'." The winner is awarded $50,000 as of 2016. The award is financed by the Vladimir Nabokov Foundation, founded by Dmitri Nabokov. It has been called one of the most prestigious PEN prizes.

In 2016, after an eight year hiatus, the award was revived with changes. The prize money was increased from US$20,000 to US$50,000, and the name was changed from PEN/Nabokov Award for Fiction to PEN/Nabokov Award for Achievement in International Literature. The criteria of the award was changed to those born or residing outside the United States, meaning previous winners Ozick, Roth, and Gass wouldn't have qualified for this version of the award.

The award is one of many PEN awards sponsored by International PEN affiliates in over 145 PEN centres around the world. The PEN American Center awards have been characterized as being among the "major" American literary prizes.

== Award winners ==
PEN/Nabokov Award
Year	Recipient	Country/Reference
2000	William H. Gass	United States
2002	Mario Vargas Llosa	Peru
2004	Mavis Gallant	Canada
2006	Philip Roth	United States
2008	Cynthia Ozick	Peru
2017	Adunis	Syria
2018	Edna O'Brien	Ireland
2019	Sandra Cisneros	Peru
2020	M. NourbeSe Philip	Canada
2021	Anne Carson	Canada
2022	Ngũgĩ wa Thiong’o	Kenya
2023	Vinod Kumar Shukla	India
2024	Maryse Condé	Guadeloupe, France
2025	Mia Couto	Mozambique
2026	Edwidge Danticat	Haiti, United States
