= The Mind of Clay =

1985 Indian documentary film by Mani Kaul

- Mati Manas
- Directed by: Mani Kaul
- Written by: Mani Kaul; Kamal Swaroop
- Starring: Robin Das; Anita Kanwar; Ashok Sharma
- Cinematography: Venu
- Edited by: Reena Mohan
- Music by: TR Mahalingam
- Production company: Infrakino Film Production Pvt. Ltd.
- Release date: 1984
- Running time: 92 minutes
- Country: India
- Language: Hindi

The Mind of Clay (Hindi: सिद्देश्वरी Mati Manas) is a 1984 Indian documentary film directed by Mani Kaul. The film examines the art of pottery in India.

== Cast ==
Robin Das

Anita Kanwar

Ashok Sharma

== Production ==
The Mind of Clay resulted from director Mani Kaul having received an assignment from the Festival of India to produce a film about the pottery tradition in India.
