= Aadharshila =

1982 Indian Hindi film

- Directed by: Ashok Ahuja
- Written by: Ashok Ahuja
- Produced by: Ashok Ahuja
- Starring: Naseeruddin Shah; Anita Kanwar; Devki Nandan Pandey; Neena Gupta; Raja Bundela; K. K. Raina; Annu Kapoor
- Cinematography: Sharad Navle
- Edited by: Renu Saluja
- Music by: Uttam Singh
- Release date: 1982
- Running time: 154 minutes
- Language: Hindi

Aadharshila (English: The Foundation Stone) is a 1982 Hindi-language film written, produced and directed by Ashok Ahuja, starring Naseeruddin Shah and Anita Kanwar. The film won the Filmfare Critics Award for Best Movie and the Indira Gandhi Award for Best Debut Film of a Director.

== Synopsis ==
The film is about Ajay (Naseeruddin Shah), a young filmmaker, hoping to direct his first film. He has just got married, and shares his hopes with his wife Asha (Anita Kanwar). Asha works as a teacher to support them, while Ajay takes on other work, but is always hoping to make his film. Aadharshila portrays the struggles of young people - especially graduates of the Film and Television Institute of India - to find a foothold in the Indian film industry. The film ends with the completion of the film-within-a-film.

== Cast ==
- Naseeruddin Shah
- Anita Kanwar
- Devki Nandan Pandey
- K. K. Raina
- Neena Gupta
- Pankaj Kapur
- Raghubir Yadav
- Annu Kapoor

== Soundtrack ==
1. "Mehka Hua Gulab Ho Tum" - Dilraj Kaur, Suresh Wadkar
2. "Sapnon Ka Sheher Hai Ye" -Bhupinder Singh
3. "Sabse Bada Hai Kyo" - Aziz Nazan, Mahendra Kapoor
4. "Yeh Jag Jhootha" - Anuradha Paudwal
5. "Sarka Le Khatiya Naa Baba" - Krishna Kalle, Bhushan Mehta

== Awards ==
- Filmfare Critics Award for Best Movie
- Indira Gandhi Award for Best Debut Film of a Director
- Film Ducat, International Filmfestival Mannheim-Heidelberg
