= Vinod Kumar Shukla =

Indian writer (1937–2025)

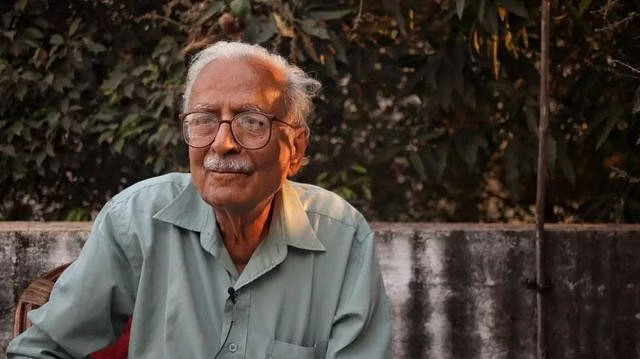
- Born: 1 January 1937; Rajnandgaon, Nandgaon State, British India
- Died: 23 December 2025 (aged 88); Raipur, Chhattisgarh, India
- Education: Master of Science in Agriculture
- Alma mater: Jawaharlal Nehru Krishi Vishwa Vidyalaya, Jabalpur
- Occupations: Poet, novelist, short-story writer, teacher
- Writing career
- Language: Hindi
- Years active: 1971–2025
- Period: 1971–2025
- Notable work: Deewar Mein Ek Khirkee Rehti Thi
- Notable awards: Jnanpith Award (2024); Sahitya Akademi Award (1999); PEN/Nabokov Award (2023)

Vinod Kumar Shukla (1 January 1937 – 23 December 2025) was an Indian Hindi writer known for his writing style that often bordered on magical realism. His works included the novels Naukar Ki Kameez (Servant's shirt) and Deewar Mein Ek Khirkee Rehti Thi (A window lived in a wall). The latter won the Sahitya Akademi Award for the best Hindi work in 1999. This novel has been made into a stage play by theatre director Mohan Maharishi.

Shukla became the first Chhattisgarhi to receive the Jnanpith Award, and was also the first Indian author to receive the PEN/Nabokov Award for Achievement in International Literature.

== Early life and work ==
Shukla was born on 1 January 1937 in Rajnandgaon, Chhattisgarh, the then princely state of Nandgaon in a Kanyakubja Brahmin family. He completed his post-graduation as M.Sc. in Agriculture from Jawaharlal Nehru Krishi Vishwa Vidyalaya (JNKVV) in Jabalpur whereafter he joined the Agriculture College, Raipur as a lecturer. He was inspired considerably by the poet Muktibodh who was then a lecturer in Hindi at Digvijay College, Rajnandgaon, and was a colleague of Padumlal Punnalal Bakshi. Baldev Mishra, an eminent Hindi literature personality in his own right was also at Rajnandgaon during the same period.

“Kehne ke liye itna adhik aur bikhra hua hai, ki main apne ko samet nahi paata”, said Shukla in a rare Facebook Live in the April 2020, but what he couldn't express in spoken language, he more than made up for it in written language.

His first collection of poems "Lagbhag Jai Hind" was published in 1971. "Vah Aadmi Chala Gaya Naya Garam Coat Pehankar Vichar Ki Tarah" was his second collection of poems, published in 1981 by Sambhavna Prakashan.

"Naukar Ki Kameez" was his first novel, published in 1979 by the same publisher and was made into the film of the same name by Mani Kaul. "Ped Par Kamra" (Room on the Tree), a collection of short stories, was brought out in 1988, and another collection of poems in 1992, titled "Sab Kuch Hona Bacha Rahega."

During his stint as a guest littérateur at the Nirala Srijanpeeth in Agra from 1994 to 1996, he wrote two novels Khilega To Dekhenge and Deewar Mein Ek Khirkee Rehti Thi. He won the Sahitya Akademi Award for the latter. In 2005, the novel was also later translated into English by Prof. Satti Khanna of Duke University as A Window Lived in a Wall. It was published by Sahitya Akademi, New Delhi.

He was presented with an artists' residency by Ektara - Takshila's Centre for Children's Literature & Art where he produced a novel for Young Adults called "Ek Chuppi Jagah". His works have been translated into several languages since.

== Death ==
Shukla died from interstitial lung disease and pneumonia at AIIMS, Raipur, on 23 December 2025 at the age of 88, shortly before his 89th birthday.

Tributes were paid by notable scholars, writers, authors and academics. The Prime Minister of India mourned his loss by penning a statement that read

"I am deeply saddened by the demise of the renowned writer Vinod Kumar Shukla ji, honored with the Jnanpith Award. For his invaluable contribution to the world of Hindi literature, he will always be remembered. In this hour of grief, my condolences are with his family and admirers. Om Shanti."

Another said, "Milna tha, Milenge. Om Shanti."

Shukla is survived by his wife Sudha Shukla, son Shashwat, and a daughter Vichardarshini.

== Accolades ==
Shukla's writing career spanned 55 years. he was given numerous awards and accolades for his contribution to Hindi Literature, and the adaption of a new lens that preferred reflective simplicity over flagrant and ornate language.

In March 2025, he was announced as the 59th Jnanpeeth Awardee, India's highest literary honour, for his exceptional and poetic work. He was presented the award on 21 November 2025, in a special ceremony arranged at his home in Raipur, Chhattisgarh. The PEN/Nabokov Award for Achievement in International Literature, the Shikhar Samman, the Rashtriya Hindi Gaurav Samman, the Maithilisharan Gupt Samman are but some of the other awards in a long list of accolades he got for his influential writing work.
