= Naukar Ki Kameez =

- Directed by: Mani Kaul
- Written by: Vinod Kumar Shukla
- Based on: Naukar Ki Kameez novel by Vinod Kumar Shukla
- Starring: Pankaj Sudhir Mishra; Anu Joseph; Om Prakash Dwivedi
- Cinematography: K. U. Mohanan
- Edited by: Mani Kaul; Srinivas Patro
- Music by: Pushparaj Koshti
- Release date: 1999
- Running time: 104 minutes
- Country: India
- Language: Hindi

Naukar Ki Kameez (The Servant's Shirt) is a 1999 Hindi film based on Vinod Kumar Shukla's novel of the same name. It was directed by Mani Kaul and starred Pankaj Sudhir Mishra, Anu Joseph and Om Prakash Dwivedi.

The film was released on 30 September 1999 in Netherlands.

== Storyline ==
Santu, a young low level clerk in a small town government office, lives with his wife in a small rented house. He is often the object of ridicule at the office. One day, at the officer's bungalow, a run-away servant's left-behind shirt is found to fit him. He is forced into the position of doing errands around the house before going to work at the office. The film depicts his efforts to resist the efforts of his boss, landlord and landlord's wife to make him into a servant while trying to maintain his social standing.

His wife, on the other hand, within the space of her home is more in control of herself. But even she called upon to do the bidding of the doctor's wife on one or the other pretext. The circle of exploitation perpetuates itself. But at the end, Santu comes home to tell his wife, "From tomorrow I shall not go the Sahib's bungalow. And you, you will not go to the doctor's house."

== Cast ==
- Pankaj Sudhir Mishra
- Anu Joseph
- Om Prakash Dwivedi
