= Ebrahim Alkazi =

Indian theatre director (1925–2020)

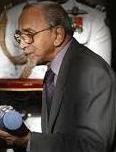
- Born: 18 October 1925; Pune, Bombay Presidency, British India
- Died: 4 August 2020 (aged 94); New Delhi, India
- Education: St. Vincent's High School, Pune; St. Xavier's College, Mumbai
- Occupation: Theatre director
- Known for: Ashadh Ka Ek Din
- Spouse: Roshan Alkazi (m. 1946; died 2007)
- Children: 2, including Amal Allana
- Relatives: Zuleikha Chaudhuri (granddaughter)
- Awards: Padma Vibhushan (2010); Sangeet Natak Akademi Fellowship

Ebrahim Alkazi (18 October 1925 – 4 August 2020) was a Saudi Indian theatre director and drama teacher. A rigid disciplinarian, he instilled in his acting students an awe and reverence that they still carry with them, with several of them having had the privilege of continuing the practice and training in the NSD Repertory Company, an introduction made to the National School of Drama by Alkazi. His standards later became very influential. He also remained the Director of National School of Drama, New Delhi (1962–1977). He was also a noted art connoisseur, collector and gallery owner, and founded the Art Heritage Gallery in Delhi with his wife, Roshen Alkazi.

Staging more than fifty plays in his lifetime, Alkazi used both proscenium stages and the open-air venues. His designs for the open-air venues were acclaimed for their visual nature and for the original spins he put on each stage production, including those he had previously directed before. Trained at Royal Academy of Dramatic Art (RADA), he won the BBC Broadcasting Award in 1950. He has directed over 50 plays, including famous productions of: Girish Karnad's Tughlaq, Mohan Rakesh's Ashadh Ka Ek Din, Dharamvir Bharati's Andha Yug and numerous Shakespeare and Greek plays. In 2002, Ebrahim Alkazi said in an interview with the BBC, "I think that there are certain ground root elements in theatre, there is a certain set of rootedness and earthiness in the work you do, and unless your inspiration and the concept in the work of theatre starts from there, I don’t think you can create fine work. You have to create an atmosphere; you have to work within salubrious surrounding".

== Early life and education ==
Ebrahim Alkazi hailed from an Arab family with a keen interest in arts. Born in Pune, Alkazi was the son of a wealthy businessman with roots in Unaizah (present-day Saudi Arabia) and a Kuwaiti mother.

Educated in Pune, at the St. Vincent's High School, Alkazi shifted to Bombay in late 1941, after his enrollment at the St. Xavier's College, Mumbai, which provided his first encounter with the new techniques of theatre at the Dramatic Society of the St.Xavier's College. In 1947, the rest of his family migrated to Pakistan while Alkazi stayed back in India. Alkazi was educated in Arabic, English, Marathi, and Gujarati. While he was a student at St Xavier's, he joined Sultan "Bobby" Padamsee's English theatre company, Theatre Group, where he acted in several plays, as well as directed a few of them. Thereafter he was trained at the Royal Academy of Dramatic Art (RADA) in London in 1947. In London he was offered career opportunities after being honored by both the English Drama League and the British Broadcasting Corporation, however, he turned the offers down in favor of returning home to rejoin the Theatre Group, which he ran from 1950 to 1954. Alkazi was also a keen artist and student of art; in England, he had spent hours studying major museum collections, and F. N. Souza was his flatmate. Alkazi's works were exhibited at the Asian Institute, London (1950), the Jehangir Art Gallery, Bombay (1952) and at the Sridharini Gallery, New Delhi (1965). In each exhibition he demonstrated a versatile command over a variety of media and techniques, ranging from watercolor, charcoal, ink, poster paint and carbon tracing to the sketch pen, marker and frottage.

== Career ==
After his return from England, Ebrahim Alkazi regrouped the Theatre Group in Bombay in 1952. At this point, he was also associated with the Bombay Progressive Artists' Group, which included M. F. Husain F.N.Souza, S. H. Raza, Akbar Padamsee, Tyeb Mehta, artists who were later to paint from his plays and design his sets. Initiating his curatorial practices, Alkazi mounted an eight part exhibition, between 1952 and 1957, called This is Modern Art at the Jehangir Gallery in Bombay. In 1954, after breaking from the Theatre Group, Alkazi formed the Theatre Unit in Bombay along with his wife, Roshen Alkazi and Nissim Ezekiel. In addition to his directing, he also published the Theatre Unit Bulletin which reported on theatre events from India. Alkazi established the School of Dramatic Arts on 4 July 1956 and became the principal of Bombay's Natya Academy. During his Bombay days Alkazi along with his theatre groups produced 'practically the entire pantheon of western literature', "from the Greeks to Beckett", as the theatre doyen would describe. Few of the later productions, which were staged at the sea-facing open air theatre in Bombay called Meghdoot, designed by Alkazi himself in 1958, included Medea (1961), Waiting for Godot (1961), and Suddenly Last Summer (1961).

In 1962, Alkazi embarked upon his journey to develop a pedagogic discourse for theatre in form of the National School of Drama. He designed a course, which not only focused on actor-training and direction, but on the learning of all aspects of stage-craft. As the director of the National School of Drama (NSD), Alkazi revolutionised Hindi theatre by the magnificence of his vision, and the meticulousness of his technical discipline. From the 60s on, the outstanding talent groomed by Alkazi at NSD was to directly feed an alternative stream of arthouse, and then mainstream cinema and television. His students include many well-known film and theatre actors and directors including Vijaya Mehta, Om Shivpuri, Harpal Tiwana and Neena Tiwana, Om Puri, Balraj Pandit (Pandit Ji) Naseeruddin Shah, Manohar Singh, Uttara Baokar, Jyoti Subhash, Suhas Joshi, B. Jayashree, Jayadev and Rohini Hattangadi, Kumara Varma, S. Ramanujam. While there he created the Repertory Company in 1964 and directed their productions until he left. Alkazi pioneered the construction of new theatre spaces on and near the school campus, and most memorably placed his productions of Tughlaq and Andha Yug in spectacular historical monuments around Delhi.

He also founded Art Heritage Gallery in Delhi with his wife, Roshan Alkazi.

== Awards and recognition ==
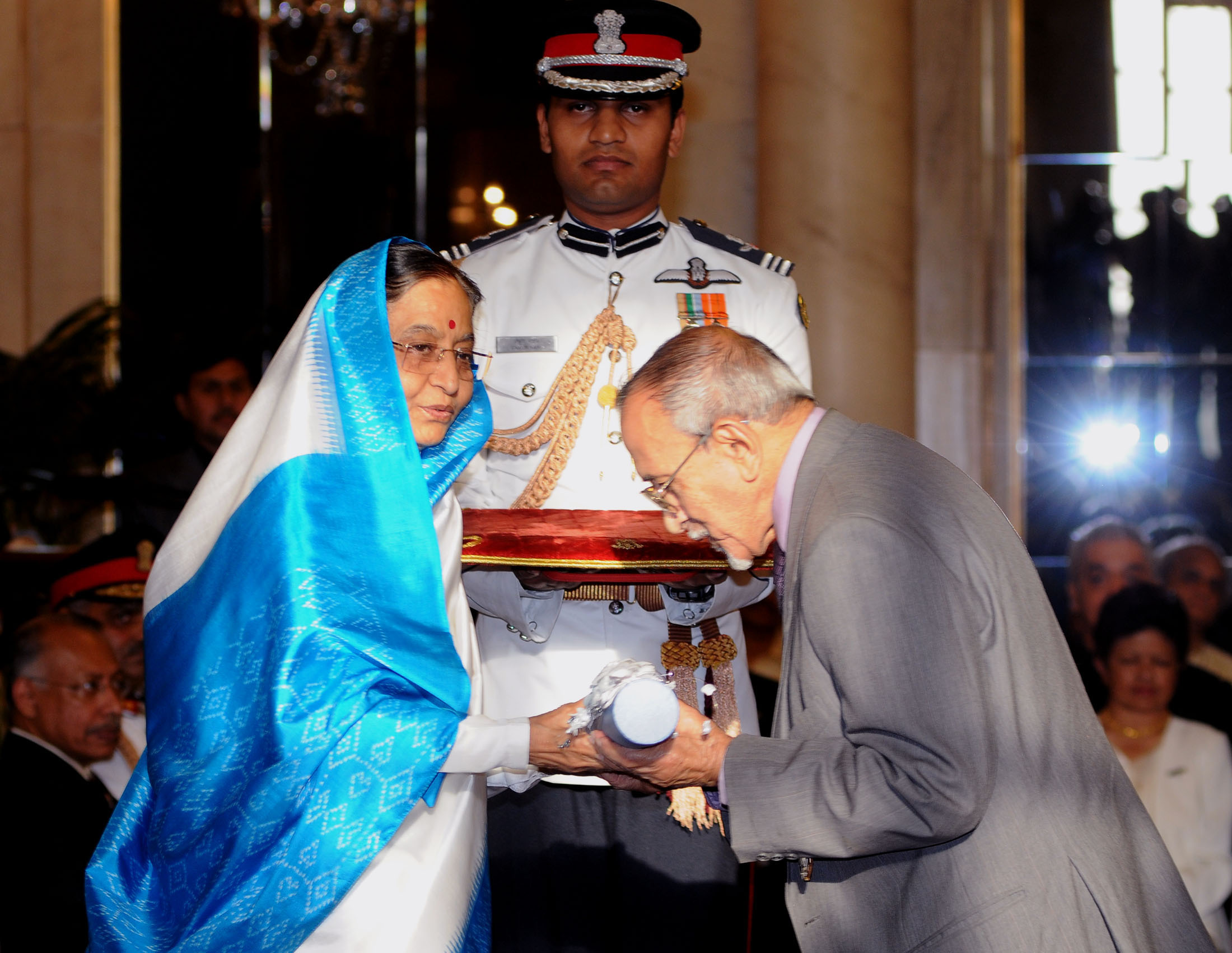
The President, Smt. Pratibha Devisingh Patil presenting Padma Vibhushan Award to Shri Ebrahim Hamed Alkazi at the Civil Investiture Ceremony-I, at Rashtrapati Bhavan, in New Delhi on 31 March 2010

Alkazi won many of India's most prestigious awards, creating an awareness of theater's sensibility and successfully mixed modern expression with Indian tradition.

He was the first recipient of Roopwedh Pratishtan's the Tanvir Award (2004) for lifetime contribution to the theatre. He has received awards including the Padma Shri (1966), the Padma Bhushan (1991), and India's second highest civilian award the Padma Vibhushan in 2010.

He has also been awarded twice by the Sangeet Natak Akademi, India's National Academy for Music, Dance and Drama. He received the Sangeet Natak Akademi Award in Direction in 1962, and later the Akademi's highest award the Sangeet Natak Akademi Fellowship for lifetime contribution to theatre.

In 2019, in New Delhi, the Saudi Ministry of Culture inaugurated the "Ebrahim al-Kazi Chair" to honor the influential artistic endeavors of Ebrahim Bin Hamad al-Kazi. The Ministry highlighted that al-Kazi's groundbreaking contributions had opened new vistas in Indian theater and arts, fostering a generation of notable artists. The Ministry also underscored that al-Kazi's commitment to education and cultural development was highly valued in the Kingdom and that his legacy symbolizes the deep cultural ties between Saudi Arabia and India.

== Personal life ==
He was married to Roshan Alkazi (born Roshen Padamsee; 1923 – 29 August 2007), an Ismaili Khoja from Gujarat on October 1946. She designed costumes for all his plays, and wrote two books on history of Indian garments. She also established the Art Heritage Gallery at Triveni Kala Sangam, Delhi in 1977, which she ran for over 40 years. The couple had two children, Amal Allana, a theatre director and ex – chairman of National School of Drama, and Feisal Alkazi a Delhi-based theatre director.

== Works ==
- Alkazi collection of photography, with Rahaab Allana, Pramod Kumar, Brunei Gallery. Grantha Corporation, 2008. ISBN 81-89995-18-9.
