= Zuleikha Chaudhuri =

Indian theatre director

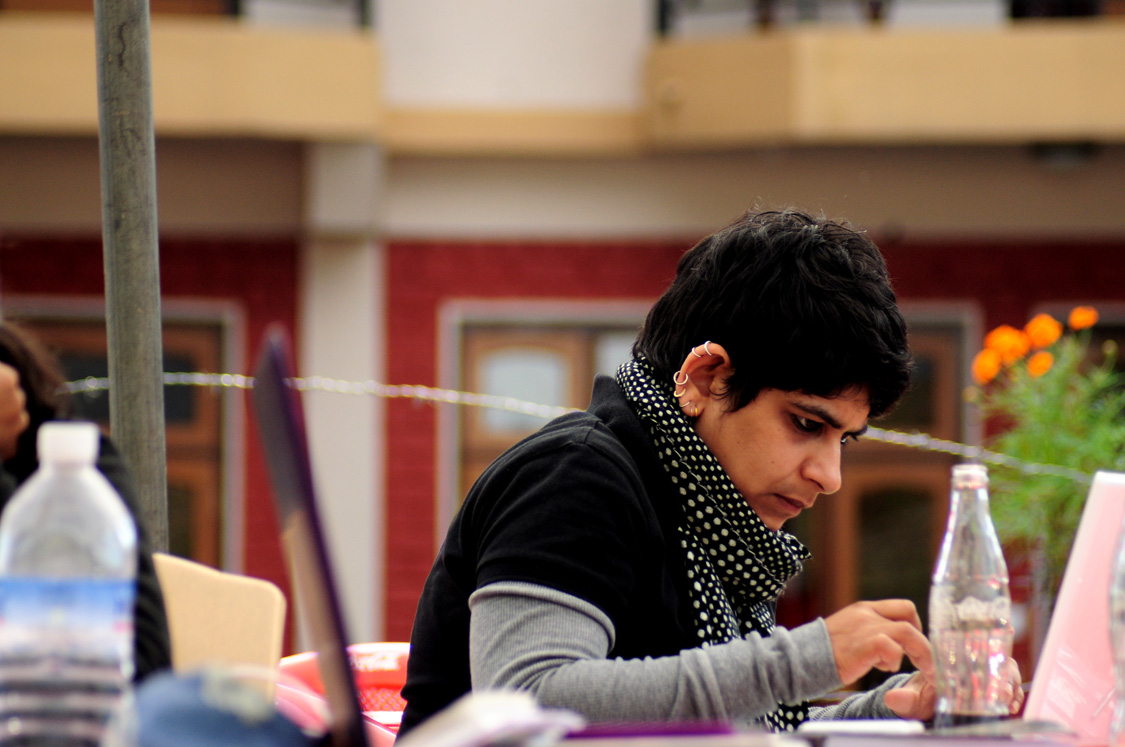
- Zuleikha Chaudhuri during the Hans Ulrich Obrist Khoj Marathon, 2011.
- Born: India
- Education: National School of Drama
- Occupations: Theatre director, scenographer, writer
- Years active: 1990s–present
- Employer: Jawaharlal Nehru University
- Known for: Contemporary theatre direction and scenography

Zuleikha Chaudhari is a theatre director and lighting designer based in New Delhi and Mumbai, India. She is also a Visiting Faculty (Scene Work) at The Dramatic Art and Design Academy, New Delhi.

She was awarded the Sangeet Natak Academy, YUVA PURUSKAR in 2007 and Charles Wallace India Trust Award, 2001/2002.

== Education and early life ==
Chaudhari majored in Theatre Directing and Light Design from Bennington College in Vermont, USA in 1995. She is the granddaughter of Ebrahim Alkazi, eminent Indian theatre director and daughter of Amal Allana, theatre director and former Chairperson of National School of Drama, New Delhi. She notes about her prominent lineage, "Contrary to popular belief I did not grow up with rehearsals all around me. As children, we never watched that much theatre. Maybe, because we didn't show that much interest. I arrived at it on my own."

== Work ==
Her experiments with space and narrative widely informs her works. Her work investigates the nature of performance in itself and explores the relationship between the text and the performer, between the performer and space, and the role of the spectator in the performative experience. She describes her works as "an exploration of space and the role that space plays in the construction and experience of narratives – whether it is the space of the human body, or the space of the place within which the performance is happening." Her first major theatre production was 'Roland Schimmelpfennig's Arabian Night', an experimental site-specific installation and performance supported by Max Mueller Bhavan in association with Khoj International Artists' Association. The production opened in Khoj Studios, New Delhi, in 2006 and was presented again in Seoul Performing Arts Festival, Seoul, 2007.

She continued this style of site-specific installation and performance art with her next project, 'On Seeing', based on Haruki Murakami's short story, On Seeing the 100% Perfect Girl One Beautiful April Morning, presented in 2008 at Khoj Studios, New Delhi and different theatre festivals and at Essl Museum, Vienna in 2010. Set in three rooms at Khoj Studios, New Delhi, this performance required the audience to move with the actors. Chaudhuri explains about this unique performance, "When the performance and audience move – the text gets fragmented. I wanted to explore that connection."

Chaudhuri's project 'Some Stage Directions for Henrik Ibsen's John Gabriel Borkman' based on Norwegian playwright Henrik Ibsen's penultimate play, John Gabriel Borkman with texts by the Raqs Media Collective was commissioned for the Delhi Ibsen Festival, 2009.

Chaudhuri's later work consisted of installations developed from her stage productions. Her next project, 'Propositions: On text and Space', a take-off from her earlier stage production, 'Some Stage Directions for Henrik Ibsen's John Gabriel Borkman', developed in collaboration with Khoj Studios' Artist Residency programme in 2010, does away with the actors and is translated through space and texts from the play. Her next project, 'Propositions: On text and Space II', a light and text installation, based on texts from Roland Schimmelpfennig's play 'Before/Afterwards', opened at Project 88, Mumbai, in collaboration with Max Mueller Bhavan, Mumbai in 2011. Devoid of any performers, the installation of the play, investigates the nature of narrative in text, sound, space and light.

Her latest project, 'Seen at Secunderabad', in collaboration with Raqs Media Collective, was a multi-media performance that attempted to deconstruct a photograph taken by colonial war photographer Felice Beato in 1857. The project premiered in Kunstenfestivaldesarts, Brussels in 2011.

== Personal life ==
Chaudhuri was previously married to Manish Choudhary, an actor. During marriage they collaborated on many of her productions, such as On Seeing the 100% Perfect Girl One Beautiful April Morning and Arabian Nights. Their former group, called Performers at Work, started in 1997 and primarily worked on translating text into visuals. The group has produced works such as Siddhartha by Hermann Hesse, Virginia Woolf's Orlando and their very own, The Mahabharata Project.
