= Thodasa Roomani Ho Jayen =

1990 film directed by Amol Palekar

Thodasa Roomani Ho Jaayen
- Poster
- Directed by: Amol Palekar
- Screenplay by: Chitra Palekar (screenplay & dialogues)
- Produced by: Doordarshan
- Starring: Anita Kanwar; Nana Patekar; Vikram Gokhale
- Music by: Bhaskar Chandavarkar; Kamlesh Pandey (lyrics)
- Release date: 23 August 1990
- Running time: 160 minutes
- Country: India
- Language: Hindi

Thodasa Roomani Ho Jayen (transl. Let's get a bit romantic) is a 1990 Hindi movie directed by Amol Palekar. It features Anita Kanwar, Nana Patekar, and Vikram Gokhale as major actors. This movie has become a part of management courses and studies pertaining to human behaviour.

== Plot ==
The movie has a lot of poetry within itself. Anita Kanwar is an unconventional girl lacking confidence. All people around her, including her brother, keep advising her "how she should be." Then, a magician who can bring rain comes into their lives. He helps her realize the potential of believing. He brings back beauty and confidence to her. Now, she realizes altogether a different life, just because of believing or changing her perception.

The theme of the movie is also said to be inspired by the critically acclaimed The Rainmaker (play) written by N. Richard Nash.

== Cast ==
- Anita Kanwar
- Nana Patekar
- Vikram Gokhale

== Critical reception ==
The film was featured in Avijit Ghosh's book, 40 Retakes: Bollywood Classics You May Have Missed.

== Details ==
The movie was shot in Pachmarhi in Madhya Pradesh.
