= Uski Roti =

- A still
- Directed by: Mani Kaul
- Written by: Mohan Rakesh (original story, dialogue); Mani Kaul (screenplay)
- Produced by: Rochak Pandit
- Starring: Gurdeep Singh, Garima
- Cinematography: K. K. Mahajan
- Music by: Ratan Lal (santoor)
- Release date: 1969
- Running time: 110 minutes
- Country: India
- Language: Hindi

Uski Roti (English titles: Other's bread, His/her bread, A Day's Bread) is a 1969 Hindi film directed by Mani Kaul. It was Kaul's first feature film, based on a short story of the same name by Mohan Rakesh, who also wrote the dialogue for the film. The film won the 1970 Filmfare Critics Award for Best Movie, and is considered a seminal work of the Indian New Wave.

== Synopsis ==
The film depicts the life of a bus driver Sucha Singh (Gurdeep Singh) and his wife Balo (Garima). Balo has to get Sucha Singh's food ready every day, walk a long distance through the fields and wait for him on the highway as he drives past the village. He leads an independent life, playing cards with his friends and spending time with his mistress, and comes home only once a week. However, he expects his wife to play the traditional role. The narrative is non-linear, hence we can attest to incidents but not be certain of sequence. One day Balo is delayed as she endeavors to save her sister from the advances of a lecherous villager. Sucha Singh is angry, drives away without his food, declares his freedom to come home when he chooses. The ending is indeterminate.

== Cast ==
- Gurdeep Singh − Sucha Singh
- Garima − Balo
- Richa Vyas − Balo's sister
- Savita Bajaj − Sucha Singh's mistress

== Crew ==
- Director – Mani Kaul
- Story – Mohan Rakesh
- Screenplay – Mani Kaul
- Producer – Rochak Pandit
- Cinematographer – K. K. Mahajan
- Assistant Director – John Abraham

== Production ==
The film was shot on location in a Punjab village. Still photographer Navroze Contractor helped Mani Kaul in his search for the right location. During this time, they also had long discussions on black-and-white, lenses, light, etc. Later, Contractor was to be Kaul's cinematographer for his third film Duvidha.

John Abraham, who subsequently became known as a filmmaker, started his career by assisting Kaul on Uski Roti.

== Reception ==
Uski Roti marked a major departure from the conventions of narrative cinema, dispensing altogether with plot in the usual sense. Kaul also did not use any established film actors. There is little dialogue in the film. The dialogue is delivered in undramatic monotones, somewhat reminiscent of the films of Robert Bresson, whom Kaul acknowledged as a major influence. The camera, wielded by K. K. Mahajan, dwells on faces, hands and exteriors - mud walls, a windswept highway, a guava orchard. The emphasis on hands is particularly Bressonian. In the words of Derek Malcolm, "The film is not an orthodox narrative, dealing instead with silence, mood and imagery." In a 1994 interview, Kaul said, "When I made A Day’s Bread, I wanted to completely destroy any semblance of a realistic development, so that I could construct the film almost in the manner of a painter."

Due to its radical departures from the prevalent cinematic norms, the film did not get commercial theatrical release. However, it did win the debutant director the 1970 Filmfare Critics Award for Best Movie, and also won Mahajan his second National Film Award for Best Cinematography. Subsequently, it has been recognised as "one of the key films of the New Indian Cinema or the Indian New Wave". Shyam Benegal considers it "as much a landmark as Pather Panchali". In recent years, it has received renewed appreciation, being screened at retrospectives, aired on television channels such as Channel 4, and also distributed in DVD form. A reviewer for Channel 4 writes: "Mani Kaul takes us on a moving journey into the internal life of his protagonist, and KK Mahajan's cinematography will linger long in the viewer's mind." In a 2009 book on Indian cinema by Ashish Rajadhyaksha, an entire chapter is devoted to Uski Roti.

== Awards ==
- K. K. Mahajan received the National Film Award for Best Cinematography
- Mani Kaul received the 1970 Filmfare Critics Award for Best Movie.
