= Manjit Tiwana =

Indian poet (born 1947)

Manjit Tiwana (born 1947) is an Indian poet. Her first poem was published in Nagmani when she was only sixteen. Manjit has authored seven collections of poetry, the significant poetical works are: Ilham (1976), Ilzam (1980), Tarian di joon (1982), Unida Wartman (1987), Savitri (1989) and Jin Prem Kiyo.

== Awards ==
She is the recipient of the Sahitya Akademi award (1990) for Uninda Wartman (Poetry) and the Shiromani Punjabi Kavi Puraskar by Punjab State Languages Department for the year 1999.
