= Ashadh Ka Ek Din =

Hindi play

Ashadh Ka Ek Din (Hindi: आषाढ़ का एक दिन, One Day in Ashadh) is a Hindi play by Mohan Rakesh that debuted in 1958 and is considered the first Modern Hindi play. The play received a Sangeet Natak Akademi Award for best play in 1959 and has been staged by several prominent directors to critical acclaim. A feature film based on the play was directed by Mani Kaul and released in 1971, and went on to win Filmfare Critics Award for Best Movie for the year.

Before it Hindi plays to date were either idealistic or didactic, devoid of connection with contemporary reality; above all their language remained the language of literature, which wasn't suitable for the stage, but this play changed it all. Mohan Rakesh went on to write two more plays, and left one unfinished at the time of his death in 1972, but he had shifted the landscape of Hindi theatre.

== Title of the play ==
The title of the play derives from the second verse of the Sanskrit dramatist Kalidas's play Meghadūta. It means A day in (the month of) Ashadh. Since the month of Ashadh is usually the onset period of the monsoon in North India, the name can be understood to mean One day during the Monsoon.

== The plot ==
Ashadh ka ek din is a three-act play centered on Kalidas' life, sometime in the 100BCE-400CE period. In the first act, he is leading a peaceful life in a Himalayan village and is romantically involved with his sweetheart, Mallika. However, he is approached to appear at King Chandragupta's court in far-off Ujjayini. Torn between his current idyllic existence and love on one hand, and the desire to achieve greatness on the other, he leaves for Ujjayini in a conflicted state of mind. Mallika wants the best for the man she loves, so she encourages him to go to Ujjayini. In the second act, Kalidas has achieved fame and is married to a sophisticated noblewoman, Priyangumanjari, while Mallika is heartbroken and alone. Kalidas visits his village with his wife and a small retinue.

He avoids meeting Mallika, but Priyangumanjari does. Priyangumanjari demeaningly offers to help her by making her a royal companion and marrying her to one of the royal attendants, but Mallika declines. In the third act, Kalidas reappears in the village. Mallika, who is now a prostitute with a small daughter, learns that he has renounced his courtly life and the governorship of Kashmir that he had been granted. Kalidas comes to see Mallika but, learning of her situation, despairs. The play ends with him leaving her house abruptly. Mallika, in a soliloquy says, "Even if I did not remain in your life, you always remained in mine. I never let you wander from my side. You continued to create and I believed that I too am meaningful, that my life is also productive."

One critic has observed that each act ends "with an act of abandonment on the part of Kalidasa: when he leaves for Ujjayini alone; when he deliberately avoids meeting with Mallika during the subsequent visit to the village; when he leaves her home abruptly." The play portrays the personal toll that both Kalidas and Mallika pay for his decision to reach for greatness. As Kalidas deserts Mallika and moves to Ujjayini, his creativity begins to evaporate, though his fame and power continue to rise.

His wife, Priyangumanjari, struggles in vain to replicate his native surroundings but "she is no substitute for Mallika." In the final meeting between Mallika and Kalidas at the play's conclusion, Kalidas admits to Mallika that "the man she had before her was not the Kalidasa she had known." He reveals to her that "Whatever I have written has been gathered from this life. The landscape of Kumarasambhav is this Himalaya, and you are the ascetic Uma. The Yaksha's torment in Meghaduta is my torment and you are the Yakshini crushed by longing. In Abhijnanashakumtalam, it was you whom I saw in the form of Shakuntala. Whenever I tried to write, I reiterated the history of your and my life."

== Playwright's comment ==
Mohan Rakesh noted in the introduction to a subsequent play, King-swans of the Waves, that, whenever he read Kalidas' Meghdoot, he felt that the poet had distilled out his sense of acute guilt and alienation from his being into that play, and that this realization is what motivated Mohan Rakesh's writing of Ashadh ka ek din.

== Production ==
It was first performed by Calcutta-based Hindi theatre group Anamika, under director, Shyamanand Jalan (1960) and subsequently by Ebrahim Alkazi at the National School of Drama Delhi in 1962, which established Mohan Rakesh as the first modern Hindi playwright.

The authorized English translation, One Day in the Season of Rain, was done by Aparna Dharwadker and Vinay Dharwadker in 2009. It premiered at Carthage College, Kenosha, Wisconsin, on 19 March 2010 as the second annual production of Carthage Theatre's New Play Initiative. The production then traveled to the regional Kennedy Center American College Theatre Festival in East Lansing, Michigan, with performances on 6–7 January 2011. The translation was published in the Penguin Modern Classics series in 2015.

Kalindi Natyasrijan, a Bengali theatre group from Kolkata, also performed the play in Bengali titled 'Asharer Pratham Dine' (আষাঢ়ের প্রথম দিনে) on 26 April 2019 at Tapan Theatre, Kolkata. The play was translated by Goutam Chodhury and directed by Shantanu Dutta.

== Translations ==
=== Kannada ===
Kannada Theater well received the translation of this play. Well-known Poet, Translator Siddhaling Pattanshetti translated this play. This drama was published 12 times in Kannada. Under the direction of B.V. Karanth 'Aashadada Ondu dina' became one of the best performances in Kannada.
