= Saransh =

Indian educational web portal

- Country: India
- Prime Minister(s): Narendra Modi
- Key people: Smriti Irani
- Launched: 7 November 2015; 10 years ago
- Status: Active
- Website: saransh.nic.in

Saransh is a web portal launched by Central Board of Secondary Education (CBSE) of India, with the primary aim of promoting information and communication technologies in schools. The Human Resource Development Minister Smriti Irani launched the portal on 7 November 2015. Saransh is a self-review tool for all CBSE affiliated schools and parents. It serves as an interface for enhancing communication between schools as well as parents. It offers a data-driven decision support system to aid parents in evaluating the strengths and weaknesses of children, which, in turn would assist in taking informed decisions for children's future.
