= Siddheshwari =

- Directed by: Mani Kaul
- Written by: Mani Kaul
- Produced by: Films Division
- Starring: Meeta Vashisht; Muhar Biswas; Ranjana Srivastava; Shravani Mukherjee
- Cinematography: Piyush Shah
- Edited by: Lalitha Krishna
- Release date: 1989
- Running time: 123 minutes (without cuts), 92 minutes (with cuts)
- Country: India
- Language: Hindi

Siddheshwari (Hindi: सिद्देश्वरी) is a 1989 Hindi documentary film directed by Mani Kaul. It is a cinematic portrait of Siddheshwari Devi, a Hindustani classical music singer from Varanasi, India. It was produced by the Films Division of India. The film was awarded the National Award for the Best Documentary for that year in India.

== Plot ==
Although the film defies a linear plot structure, it begins with a bilingual scrolling text in Hindi and English that indicates the dominant thematic that film is knitted with. The narrative meanders between the biographic moments of Siddheshwari Devi's life, that describes her relationship with her guru and her benefactor, intertwined with the mythic history of thumri and tappa as a musical form located in the medieval ghats, gullies and mansions of Varanasi. For Mani Kaul this film, was a “poetic documentary,” in an interview he says: “in my own way, I have tried to bring poetry, documentary and fiction together. We would call it non-linear narrative.”

== Cast ==
- Mita Vasisht | Siddheshwari
- Muhar Biswas | Siddeshwari as a Child
- Ranjana Srivastava | Rajeshwari Devi
- Shravani Mukherjee | Kamala
- Pandit Narayan Misra | Siyaji Maharaj

== Crew ==
- Director - Mani Kaul
- Story - Mani Kaul
- Screenplay - Mani Kaul
- Producer - Films Division
- Cinematographer - Piyush Shah

== Critical Appreciation ==
Srikanth Srinivisan wrote in The Hindu that in Siddheshwari, instead of simply presenting biographical details or passively documenting the singer's artistry, Kaul turns the genre of cine-profile inside out, amalgamating literary, theatrical, musical and cinematic forms together to construct an experience of music. "The sprawling film blends multiple timelines, realities and geographies to sketch a unique portrait of the artist," he wrote.

In a review for The New York Times, Caryn James compared the film with an abstract painting, "wildly open to interpretation". Siddheshwari is "beautifully photographed but impenetrable," he wrote.

== Legacy ==
In 2014, critic Mark Cousins and filmmaker John Akomfrah voted for Siddheshwari on Sight & Sound's list of "The Greatest Documentaries of All Time", with the former describing the film as "Visconti meets Satyajit Ray".

This film has been categorized by Amrit Gangar as a Cinema of Prayoga film.
