= Mani Kaul =

Indian film director

- Born: Rabindranath Kaul; 25 December 1944; Jodhpur, Rajputana Agency, British India
- Died: 6 July 2011 (aged 66); Gurgaon, Haryana, India
- Occupations: Film director, film academic
- Known for: Uski Roti, Duvidha, Siddeshwari

Mani Kaul (25 December 1944 – 6 July 2011) was an Indian director of Hindi films and a figure in Indian parallel cinema. He graduated from the Film and Television Institute of India (FTII) where he was a student of Ritwik Ghatak and later became a teacher. Starting his career with Uski Roti (1969), which won him the Filmfare Critics Award for Best Movie, he went on to win four of them in all. He won the National Film Award for Best Direction in 1974 for Duvidha and later the National Film Award for his documentary film Siddheshwari in 1989.

== Early life and background ==
Born in Jodhpur, Rajasthan to a Kashmiri family, Kaul first joined FTII, Pune as a yearbook photographer and later shifted to the acting course, where noted film director Ritwik Ghatak was a teacher, graduating in 1966. He was a nephew of the actor-director Mahesh Kaul, who made films like Raj Kapoor starrer Sapno Ka Saudagar (1968).

== Career ==
His first film Uski Roti (1969) has been described as "one of the key films of the New Indian Cinema or the Indian New Wave". It marked a drastic departure from earlier Indian cinema technique, form and narrative. It was one of the early formal experimental films in Indian cinema.

Ashadh Ka Ek Din (1971), his next film, was based on a play by Mohan Rakesh.

Duvidha, his third film, was his first in colour. It grew out of a short story by Vijaydan Detha and tells the story of a merchant's son, who returns with his new bride. When he departs on a business trip, a ghost falls in love with the wife. It was widely shown across Europe. He was awarded the prestigious Jawaharlal Nehru Fellowship in 1974.

Kaul was one of the co-founders of the Yukt Film Co-operative (Union of Kinematograph Technicians) in 1976, leading to avant-garde films. Critics opined in "Mani Kaul's cinematic conception, fiction and documentary films have no clear demarcated dividing line." He also taught music in the Netherlands, and was Creative Director of the film house at Osian's Connoisseurs of Art, Mumbai.

In 1971, he was a member of the jury at the 21st Berlin International Film Festival.

He was a visiting lecturer at Harvard University for the 2000–2001 school year.

== Death ==
Mani Kaul died on 6 July 2011 at his home in Gurgaon, near Delhi, after prolonged battle with cancer. He is survived by two sons and two daughters.

== Tribute ==
Mani Kaul's significant body of work included both feature films and documentaries. In an interview Mani stated: "The dividing line from my films and documentaries is thin. Some of my films like Siddheshwari are like poetic documentaries." Mani Kaul's fellow alumni from FTII intend to put together a collective tribute to Mani Kaul and his work, and interested persons were invited to send in their thoughts on Mani as a film maker, teacher/ mentor, colleague, and as a person.

Indian film critic Khalid Mohamed commented, "As a film director, he discussed the status of women (Uski Roti, Duvidha), crafted visually seductive documentaries (Arrival, Before My Eyes, A Desert of a Thousand Lines) and went through a spell of interpreting Fyodor Dostoevsky's masterworks. The Russian writer's short story A Gentle Creature inspired Nazar, shot in low, chiaroscuro lighting."

Filmmaker Ashish Avikunthak, in his obituary of Mani Kaul published in Hindustan Times writes: "Mani Kaul had perfected the art of deeply moving his audience cerebrally by meticulous philosophical exposition. His films effortlessly employed temporality to create a deep spatial landscape in which human emotions oscillated with an incendiary provocation. This cinematic gesture was so subtle that if one were not attentive the meaning would be lost."

== Filmography ==
- Yatrik (1966) - Student diploma film
- Uski Roti (1969)
- Sara Aakash (1969) - as actor
- Ashadh Ka Ek Din (1971)
- Duvidha (1973)
- Puppeteers of Rajasthan (Documentary) (1974)
- A Historical Sketch of Indian Women (Documentary) (1975)
- Ghashiram Kotwal (1976)
- Chitrakathi (Documentary) (1977)
- Arrival (Documentary) (1980)
- Satah Se Uthata Admi (1980)
- Dhrupad (1982)
- Mati Manas (Documentary) (1984)
- A Desert of a Thousand Lines (Documentary) (1986)
- Before My Eyes (Documentary)(1989)
- Siddheshwari (Documentary) (1989)
- Nazar (1991)
- Idiot (1992)
- The Cloud Door (1995)
- Naukar Ki Kameez (The Servant's Shirt) (1999)
- Bojh (Burden) (2000)
- Ik Ben Geen Ander (I Am No Other) (Netherlands) (2002)
- A Monkey's Raincoat (Netherlands) (2005)
- Signature Film (for Osian's Cinefan Festival of Asian and Arab Cinema) (2006)

== Awards ==
=== National Film Awards ===
- 1974: Best Direction: Duvidha
- 1989: Best Documentary Film: Siddheshwari

=== Filmfare Awards ===
Mani Kaul won Filmfare Critics Award for Best Movie four times.

- 1971: Uski Roti (1970)
- 1972: Ashad Ka Ek Din (1971)
- 1974: Duvidha (1973)
- 1993: Idiot (1992)
