= Anita Kanwar =

Indian film and television actor

Anita Kanwar Sisodia
- Occupation: Actress
- Years active: 1980–1999
- Known for: "Lajjo ji" in Buniyaad

Anita Kanwar is an Indian film and television actor who is best known for her role as Lajjo ji in the 1980s Doordarshan mega soap opera Buniyaad.

An alumnus of the National School of Drama (1978 batch), Kanwar has also worked in films such as Mahesh Bhatt's Janam (1985), Mira Nair's Salaam Bombay! (1988), for which she was nominated for a Filmfare Best Supporting Actress Award and Thodasa Roomani Ho Jaayen.

In the 1990s, Kanwar took a long break from television and films before returning to play the character of Inspector KC, Chief of Homicide in the 1998 Star Plus crime series Saboot. In spite of garnering critical acclaim for her performances, she did not get roles of substance in films and was a victim of typecasting. "Such a tender, sensitive actress with the potential of Nargis! She finally ran away to Shimla," noted singer and actress Ila Arun said about Kanwar.

Kanwar lives in Gurgaon, near Delhi.

== Filmography ==
=== Films ===
- Dostana (1980)
- Aadharshila (1982)
- Spandan (1982)
- Mandi (1983)
- Janam (1985)
- Trikaal (1985) - Sylvia (Anna's mother)
- Mati Manas (1986)
- Sheela (1986)
- Amrit (1986)
- Kabhi Door Kabhi Paas Segment:Do Behna (Two Sisters) (1986–87)
- Susman (1987)
- Dacait (1987)
- Razia (1988)
- Om Dar-Ba-Dar (1988)
- Tumare Sahare (1988)
- Salaam Bombay! (1988)
- Ek Din Achanak (1989)
- Bandook Dahej Ke Seeney Par (1989)
- Reconnaissance (1990)
- A Woman (1990)
- Thodasa Roomani Ho Jayen (1990)

=== Television ===
Year	Serial	Role	Channel	Notes
1986-1987	Buniyaad	Lajjo ji	DD National	
1992-1993	Pukar			
1998	Saboot	Inspector KC	Star Plus	
