= S. M. Mehdi =

Urdu scholar & Theatre Writer

S.M. Mehdi (c. 1921 – January 2015) was an Indian Urdu playwright, journalist, Marxist thinker, and cultural commentator. Known for his experimental theatre and politically engaged writing, Mehdi was a significant figure in post-independence progressive Urdu literature. His works reflect themes of identity, social justice, and literary history, often blending Brechtian technique with classical Indo-Islamic storytelling traditions.

== Early life ==
Born in Barabanki zamindar (landlord) family, Mehdi completed his early education in Mustafabad, Bhopal. Mehdi was a student leader in Kanpur for BA and Lucknow for MA and actively involved with the Communist party. He later studied law and political science in Lucknow, where he became involved in student activism and aligned with leftist and communist ideologies.

He worked with the Urdu cell of the Communist party in Mumbai alongside Sajjad Zaheer, and was for his belief in the "fellowship of man". This is where he got involved in IPTA & met some great minds in writing, poetry.

Mehdi also worked for two decades as Urdu correspondent for the Soviet Embassy in Delhi from the 1960s until 1990.

He was married to Zahra Begum who preceded him in death by a few weeks. Their granddaughter Taran is an active documentary maker.

== Literary and artistic contributions ==
Mehdi wrote numerous plays and translated dramas into Urdu. He was a prolific writer for television, including shows focusing on India's composite culture. Mehdi was also a scholar of the Urdu poets Ghalib and Iqbal. He was later associated with the Indian People's Theatre Association (IPTA).

His works include Chand Tasviren, Chand Khutut (A Few Pictures, A Few Letters), Maamujaan ki Diary (DD Television show).

Mehdi's work drew inspiration from various traditions, including Brechtian theatre and the oral narrative styles of Tulsidas and Mir Babar Ali Anis.

Mehdi was a contemporary of the poet Kaifi Azmi, and is mentioned in relation to his grandchildren who shared memories of him and his home. Together they published weeklies Mahaz and Tahrik around the Independence Era from Mumbai (then Bombay).

== Later life ==
Mehdi died in Aligarh in January 2015 at the age of 94 in his sleep. His work, including his plays, translations, and writings, remains largely uncollected.
