= Mohan Rakesh =

Indian writer (1925–1972)

- Born: Madan Mohan Guglani; 8 January 1925; Amritsar, Punjab, India
- Died: 3 December 1972 (aged 47); Delhi, India
- Occupations: Novelist, playwright, short story writer
- Writing career
- Notable works: Ashadh Ka Ek Din (1958); Aadhe-Adhure (1969)
- Notable awards: Sangeet Natak Akademi Award (1968); Jawarharlal Nehru Fellowship (1971)

Mohan Rakesh (8 January 1925 – 3 December 1972) was an Indian Hindi playwright, novelist, short-story writer and essayist. He was a leading figure of the Nayi Kahani ("New Story") literary movement of the Hindi literature of the 1950s and a pioneer of modern Hindi theatre. He wrote the first modern Hindi play, Ashadh Ka Ek Din (One Day in Ashadha) in 1958, which won a competition organised by the Sangeet Natak Akademi. It contributed to the revival of Hindi theatre and was staged by directors including Shyamanand Jalan and Ebrahim Alkazi. His play Aadhe-Adhure (The Incomplete Ones, 1969) is one of the most significant plays about urban middle-class families and poignantly projects the transition of values in the changing urban scenario in India.

His literary output also included novels, translations, travelogues, criticism, and memoir. He was awarded the Sangeet Natak Akademi Award for playwriting in 1968, given by Sangeet Natak Akademi, India's National Academy for Performing Arts.

== Early life and education ==
He was born as Madan Mohan Guglani on 8 January 1925 in Amritsar, in the Punjab Province of British India, into a Sindhi family. His father, Karam Chand Guglani who had migrated from Sindh to Punjab long ago, was a lawyer. Due to his father's interest in literature, Rakesh developed an interest in writing. Also, Hindi writer Upendranath Ashk was a family friend. Rakesh began writing in his adolescence and developed an early interest in theatre. However, his father died when Rakesh was sixteen and thereafter his elder sister initially helped support the household during a period of financial difficulties.

He received his early education in Amritsar and subsequently joined Oriental College, Lahore (Punjab University), where he did an M.A. in Sanskrit and obtained the Shastri qualification. Following the Partition of India in 1947, he moved to Jalandhar, where he subsequently completed an M.A. in Hindi, from DAV College, Jalandhar, where he later returned as a lecturer. During his college years, he acted in a production of Svapnavasavadatta, a Sanskrit play by Bhasa.

== Career ==
He started his career as a postman in Dehradun and Bombay from 1947 to 1949. He taught at Sydenham College and Elphinstone College in Bombay. Subsequently, he remained Head of the Hindi department at DAV College, Jalandhar (Guru Nanak Dev University) and taught Hindi at Bishop Cotton School, Shimla for two years before coming back to teaching in Jalandhar. During his tenure at Bishop Cotton School, Shimla, Rakesh taught Hindi to the future author Ruskin Bond, who later recalled being taught by him during his final year at school. Eventually, he resigned from his job in 1957 to write full-time. He also briefly edited the Hindi literary journal Sarika, from 1962 to 1963.

He began writing short stories in 1944; his first published short story was Bhikshu, which appeared in the literary journal Saraswati, and over all wrote 54 stories including, Malbe Ka Malik, Quarter and Pehchaan. His early story Nanhe remained unpublished in his lifetime and appeared posthumously in the March 1973 issue of Sarika, edited by Kamleshwar.

His debut play Ashadh Ka Ek Din (One Day in Aashad) (1958), based on the life of Sanskrit poet Kalidasa and his relationship with Mallika, played a major role in reviving Hindi theatre in the 1960s. It was first performed by Kolkata-based Hindi theatre group Anamika, under director Shyamanand Jalan in 1960 and subsequently by Ebrahim Alkazi at National School of Drama Delhi in 1962. This established Mohan Rakesh as the first modern Hindi playwright. Soon, he emerged as a prominent writer of the Nayi Kahani movement of the 1950s, alongside Rajendra Yadav, Kamleshwar, and Nirmal Verma, and his work explored the changing social relationships and the uncertainties and tensions in the growing urban middle class in post-independence India.

Lahron Ke Rajhans (The Swans of the Waves, 1963), a play by Mohan Rakesh about an ancient Buddhist tale on the renunciation of the Buddha, and its aftereffects on his close family, was first written as a short story and later turned into a radio play for All India Radio, Jalandhar, and broadcast under the title Sundri, though his struggle over different versions of the play lasted for nearly 20 years. Prominent Indian directors Om Shivpuri, Shyamanand Jalan, Arvind Gaur and Ram Gopal Bajaj directed this play. Aadhe Adhure (The Incomplete Ones or Halfway House, 1969), a play about dysfunctions within an urban middle-class family, was serialised in the Hindi magazine Dharmyug in January–February 1969 and staged in Delhi by the theatre group Dishantar under Om Shivpuri on 2 March 1969.

He also wrote acclaimed novels, Andhere Band Kamre (Closed Dark Rooms, 1961) and Na Aane Wala Kal (The Tomorrow That Never Comes, 1968) and Antaraal (Interval, 1972), and translated Sanskrit plays, including Shudraka's Mṛcchakatika (The Little Clay Cart) and Kalidas's Abhijñānaśākuntalam (The Recognition of Shakuntala), into Hindi. In July 1971, he received the Jawarharlal Nehru Fellowship for research on 'The Dramatic Word'.. However, he could not complete it because he died the following year.

== Legacy ==
His plays continue to be performed and receive acclaim worldwide. One Day in the Season of Rain, Aparna Dharwadker and Vinay Dharwadker's authorised English translation of Ashadh Ka Ek Din, premiered at Carthage College in Kenosha, Wisconsin, United States in 2010 and travelled to the Kennedy Center American College Theatre Festival (Region 3) in 2011.In 2005, the Delhi-based theatre group 2nd Foundation staged Manuscript, a play directed by Soumyabrata Choudhury, a JNU professor, that explored the writing and revision of Lahron Ke Rajhans, drawing upon Rakesh's diaries, letters and other writings.

== Personal life ==
Rakesh married three times. His first two marriages ended in divorce. In 1963, he married Anita Aulakh, who was 21 years old at the time, and with whom he had a daughter, Purva.

Rakesh died on 3 December 1972 in New Delhi, due to a heart attack at age 47. After his death, Anita continued to live in the East of Kailash neighbourhood in Delhi. Her autobiographical work, Satrein Aur Satrein, was first serialised in the Hindi magazine Sarika, and later published in 2002. Her second memoir was Antim Satrein.

== Literary work ==
=== Novels (Upanyas) ===
- Andhere Band Kamre (1961)
- Na Aanewala Kal (1968)
- Antaraal (1972)
- Bakalama Khuda (1974)

=== Plays (Natak-Ekanki) ===
- Aadhe Adhure (आधे अधूरे , 1969) ISBN 978-81-8361-325-5
- Lahron Ke Rajhans ( लहरों के राजहंस, 1963) ISBN 978-81-267-1595-4
- Ashadh Ka Ek Din / आषाढ़ का एक दिन (One Day in Ashadha, 1958) ISBN 9788170284093
- Mohan Rakesh ke Sampurn Natak, 1993, Rajpal. ISBN 81-7028-152-0.

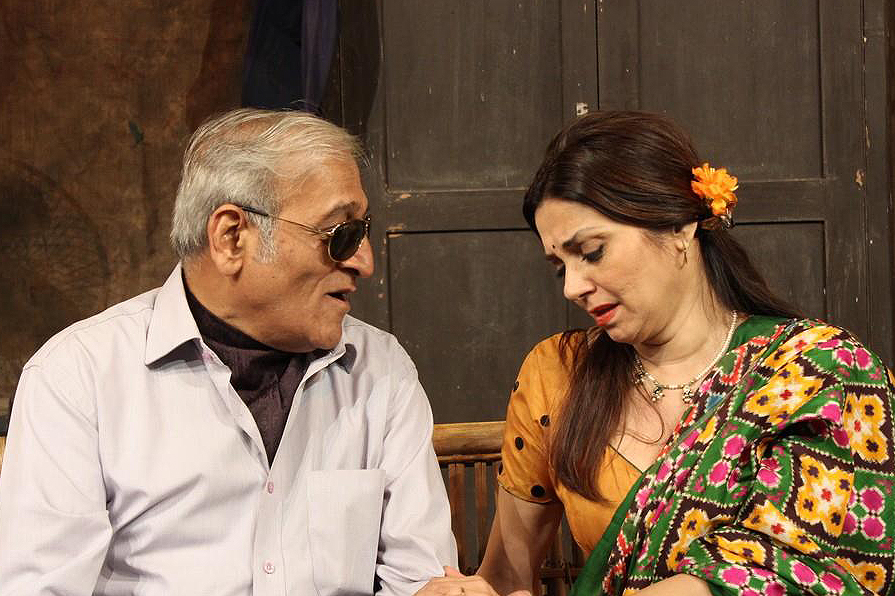
Mohan Agashe and Lillete Dubey performing in a play Aadhe Adhoore

=== Posthumously published ===
- Pairon Tale ki Zameen (1973)

^{()}

- Ande ke Chilke, anya ekanki tatha beej natak (1973)
- Rata Bitane Taka Tatha Anya Dhvani Nataka, 1974, Radhakrishna Prakashan. ISBN 81-7119-332-3. (Radio plays)

=== Translation ===
- Mrichchkatikam, (Sanskrit play)
- Shakuntalam (Sanskrit play)

=== Story anthologies (Kahani Sangrah) ===
- 10 Pratinidhi Kahaniyan (Mohan Rakesh)
- Rat ki Bahon Mein
- Mohan Rakesh ki meri prem Kahaniyan

== Kannada translations ==
=== Plays ===
- Aashadada Ondu Dina by Siddhaling Pattanshetti (1973, 1978, 1979, 1988, 1993, 2000, 2011, 2012, 2017) (Ashadh Ka Ek Din / आषाढ़ का एक दिन (One Day in Ashadha, 1958))
- Alalegalalli Rajahamsagalu by Siddhaling Pattanshetti (1980, 1988, 2017) (Lahron Ke Rajhans / लहरों के राजहंस (1963))
- Aadha Adhure by Siddhaling Pattanshetti (1976, 1989) (Aadhe Adhure / आधे अधूरे (1969))
- Kaala Kelagina Nela by Siddhaling Pattanshetti (2011) (Pairon Tale Ki Zameen (1973))

== Adaptations ==
Two of his literary works were adapted by the filmmaker Mani Kaul. The first film was Uski Roti made in 1969 based on the short story of the same name. For this film, Mohan Rakesh wrote the dialogs. The second film was Ashadh Ka Ek Din made in 1971, based on a play by Mohan Rakesh. His short stories were made into serial named Mitti Ke Rang by Doordarshan in 1993.
