= Yamini Singh (Hindi actress) =

Indian film and television actress

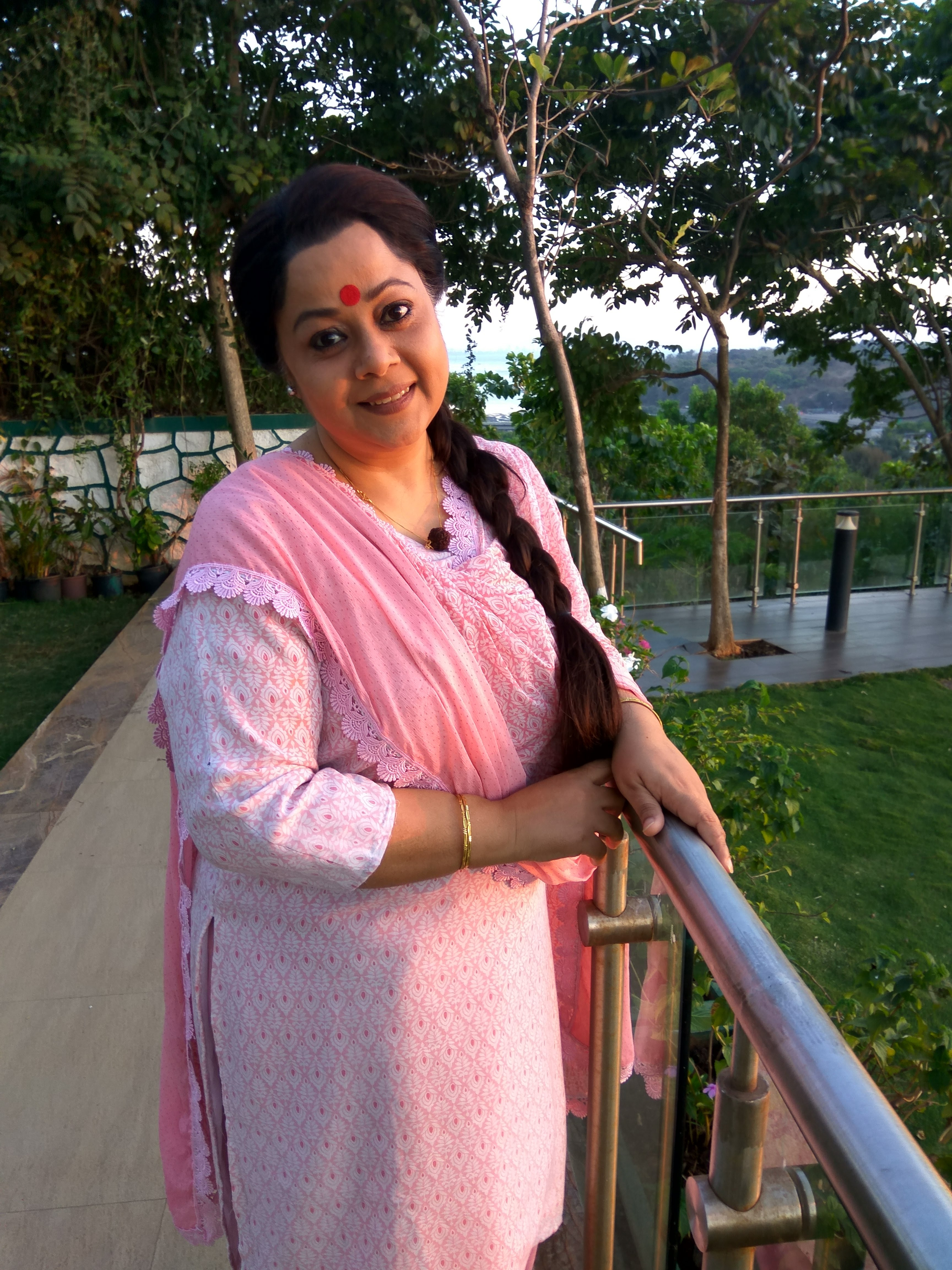
- Born: New Delhi, India
- Education: Panjab University
- Occupation: Actress
- Years active: 1990–present
- Children: Dhruv

Yamini Singh is an Indian film and television actress who works in Hindi films and television. Her first film role came in K. Bikram Singh's Tarpan (1994), also starring Om Puri, Revathi, Manohar Singh and Mita Vashisht. Some of her television shows are: Bandhan (1999), Daaman (2001), Chalti Ka Naam Gaadi...Let's Go (2015), Mere Ghar Aayi Ek Nanhi Pari (2009), Har Ghar Kuch Kehta Hai (2007) and Jhoome Jiiya Re (2007).

== Career ==
Singh debuted in the K. Bikram Singh's Revathi and the Mita Vashisht-starred film Tarpan (1994), where she played the role of Om Puri's daughter. After this, she played the character of "Lovely" in the TV series Colgate Top 10.

She has acted in soap operas including: Bandhan, Daaman, Ghar Ek Mandir, Koshish - Ek Aashaa, Shehnai, Hukum Mere Aaka, Jabb Love Hua, Shaadi Street, Hari Mirchi Laal Mirchi, Hum Hai Na La-Jawab, Meri Doli Tere Angana, Har Ghar Kuch Kehta Hai, Bidaai, Jhoome Jiiya Re, Teen Bahuraaniyaan, Mere Ghar Aayi Ek Nanhi Pari and Chalti Ka Naam Gaadi...Let's Go. She has also had episodic roles in Savdhaan India on Life OK. She appeared in several advertisements, and had a role in a play called Silsilay at Mallika Sarabhai's Natrani.

In the 2018 Hindi feature film Evening Shadows directed by Sridhar Rangayan and produced by Solaris Pictures, Yamini Singh plays the role of Sarita, a South Indian woman who tries to look at the brighter side of life, despite coming from a broken marriage due to domestic violence.

== Filmography ==
=== Films ===
Year	Title	Language	Director
1994	Tarpan	Hindi	K. Bikram Singh
1999	Hum Aapke Dil Mein Rehte Hain	Hindi	Satish Kaushik
2002	Kitne Door Kitne Paas	Hindi	Mehul Kumar
2006	Jai Santoshi Maa	Hindi	Ahmed Siddiqui
2002	Badhaai Ho Badhaai	Hindi	Satish Kaushik
2018	Evening Shadows	Hindi	Sridhar Rangayan
2021	Pagglait	Hindi	Umesh Bist

=== Television ===
Year	Title	Role	Network
1990	Bandhan		DD National
2001	Daaman		Sahara One
2000-2002	Ghar Ek Mandir		Sony Entertainment Television
2000-2002	Koshish - Ek Aashaa		Zee TV
2001	Shehnai		DD National
2011	Hukum Mere Aaka		Sahara One
2006	Hari Mirchi Lal Mirchi		DD National
2006-2007	Jabb Love Hua		Zee TV
2006	Shaadi Street		Star Plus
2015	Hum Haen Na LaJawab		Sony Entertainment Television
2007-2008	Meri Doli Tere Angana		Zee TV
2007-2008	Har Ghar Kuch Kehta Hai		Zee TV
2007-2010	Sapna Babul Ka...Bidaai		Star Plus
2007-2008	Jhoome Jiiya Re		Zee Next
2007-2008	Teen Bahuraaniyaan		Zee TV
2009	Mere Ghar Aayi Ek Nanhi Pari		Colors
2015-2016	Chalti Ka Naam Gaadi...Let's Go		SAB TV
2017–2018	Haasil		Sony Entertainment Television
2018	Gandii Baat	Eekha	ALTBalaji; ZEE5
2018–2019	Internet Wala Love		Colors TV
2018–19	Krishna Chali London		Star Plus
2022	Kabhi Kabhie Ittefaq Sey		Star Plus
2023-2024	Mann Atisundar		Dangal TV

== See also ==
- List of Indian film actresses
