= Rajiv Menon =

Indian film director, cinematographer (born 1963)

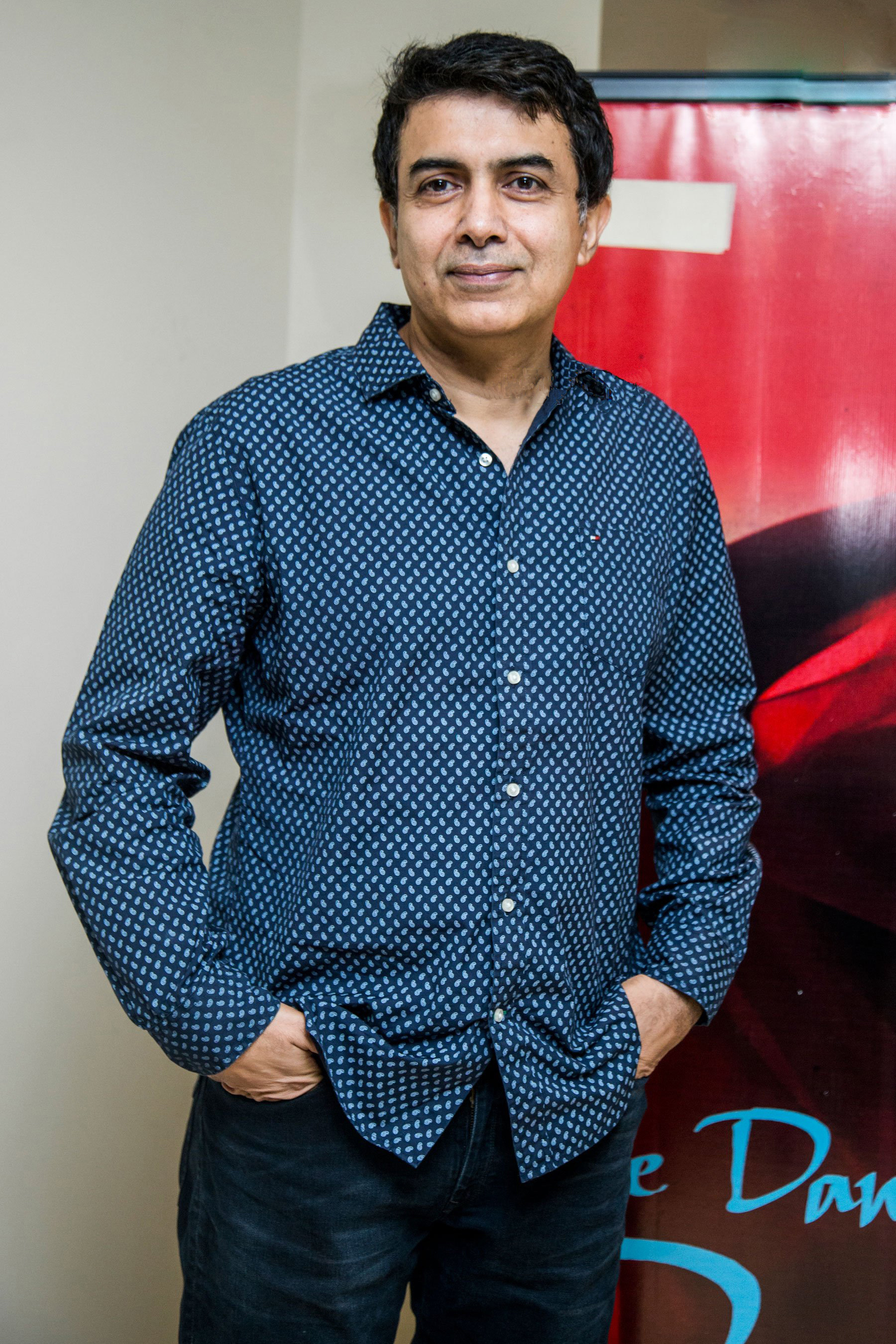
- Born: 20 April 1963 (age 63); Cochin, Kerala, India
- Education: Madras Film Institute
- Occupations: Film director; cinematographer
- Spouse: Latha
- Children: 2
- Mother: Kalyani Menon

Rajiv Menon (born 20 April 1963), is an Indian filmmaker who has worked as a director and cinematographer in several Indian regional film industries. After making his breakthrough as a film cinematographer with Mani Ratnam's Tamil drama Bombay (1995), Menon has continued to collaborate with Ratnam on other projects including Guru (2007) and Kadal (2013). He has also directed two critically acclaimed Tamil films, Minsara Kanavu (1997) and Kandukondain Kandukondain (2000), winning a Filmfare Award for the latter. After a sabbatical, Menon returned to directing with Sarvam Thaala Mayam.

Away from films, Menon is a leading Indian advertising director, and runs Rajiv Menon Productions and Mindscreen Film Institute, which supplies equipment for documentaries, advertising films and cinemas.

== Early life ==
Rajiv Menon was born on 20 April 1963 in Cochin, Kerala into a Malayalam-speaking family. His father was a naval officer, and Menon had the chance to live across different parts of India at a very young age. His mother is the noted playback singer Kalyani Menon, while his brother serves as an officer in the Indian Railways.

As a result of his travels as a youth, Menon rarely had exposure to television apart from group screenings of war films such as The Guns of Navarone (1961) at the naval base. Once his family moved to Visakhapatnam, he became increasingly interested in cinema, and was impressed by a mixture of Hindi and Malayalam films such as Abrar Alvi's Sahib Bibi Aur Ghulam (1962), Chemmeen (1965), Nirmalyam (1973), Yaadon Ki Baaraat (1973). Menon later moved to Madras aged fifteen and spent his formative years in the city. The death of his father during the period meant that Menon was left with little guidance during and did not want to take up a job which would put him in a "rat race". He was gifted a spare camera by his neighbour Desikan, a photo journalist with The Hindu, with the move igniting an interest for Menon in cinematography. After gaining admission into the Madras Film Institute, he began to explore filmmaking as a nuance and became a keen follower of the work of Bengali directors such as Satyajit Ray and Mrinal Sen, and Tamil directors such as Balu Mahendra and Mahendran.

Menon began his career in the entertainment industry as a still photographer, while also dabbling in work on fashion shoots and corporate films. He later got into commercials, and eventually graduated into working on them as a director. As a part of his commitment to an advert for Harvest Groundnut Oil, he first became acquainted with music composer A. R. Rahman, then widely known by his birth name of Dileep Kumar. The pair subsequently regularly collaborated on commercials, and often worked together in the late 1980s on brands such as Allwyn and Asian Paints.

== Film career ==
=== Debut and breakthrough, 1990–1995 ===
As his profile as an ad film-maker improved, Rajiv Menon worked on a few documentaries for filmmakers including Girish Karnad and Shyam Benegal. Karnad consequently offered him the opportunity to be the cinematographer for the Kannada film Jokumaraswamy in 1990, but the project was stalled after its lead actor Shankar Nag died in a car crash the day before the shoot. Another proposed film, Agniputhri was also shelved soon after its announcement. The following year, cinematographer P. C. Sreeram picked Menon to replace him for the shoot of Pratap Pothen's Telugu road film, Chaitanya (1991), starring Nagarjuna and Gautami. Menon has since revealed that his first assignment was a "physically and mentally exhausting" film to shoot, as it was full of chase scenes involving boats and motor cycles, and that he "couldn't wait to get back to commercials". He then worked with Karnad on a Hindi film titled Cheluvi (1992), to make up for the previous missed opportunity. During the period, Menon notably turned down the opportunity to work with M. Night Shyamalan on his directorial debut, Praying with Anger (1992), and on the chance to work as the lead actor in Mani Ratnam's romantic drama, Roja (1992).

Menon was then approached by Mani Ratnam to shoot Bombay (1994), a film centred on events that occurred leading up to the demolition of the Babri Masjid in Ayodhya, and the increased religious tensions that led to the Bombay riots. As a part of his instructions, Menon needed to depict the scenes before the riots as beautiful as possible. So, Menon suggested shooting in the rains to achieve the effect. The team shot the interiors of homes in Pollachi in Tamil Nadu and the exteriors were shot in Kasargod, and Kannur village in Kerala, while the song sequence Uyire was shot at Bekal Fort. Menon described that the success of the film "changed his life".

=== Critical acclaim, 1996–2000 ===
AVM Productions wanted to make a film to commemorate its 50th anniversary in 1997 and signed on Prabhu Deva to play a lead role and A. R. Rahman to score the music for a potential project. The production studio revealed that they were looking for a new director and Rahman suggested the name of Rajiv Menon to make his directorial debut. Menon thought about the offer for two months and was ultimately convinced by Rahman and Mani Ratnam to accept the project titled Minsara Kanavu. Arvind Swamy was then signed up for a role as was Hindi actress Kajol, to make her debut in Tamil films. The film was released in January 1997 and was successful at the Chennai box office, notably outperforming Mani Ratnam's political drama Iruvar (1997), which was released on the same day. After audiences were initially unhappy with the sad climax of the film, distributors reverted and used an alternate ending which had also been shot for the film. A critic from Indolink.com gave the film a positive review, stating that "Minsara Kanavu is again a triangular love story with a little difference. It has good entertainment value, awesome cinematography and excellent songs and choreographed dances." The film was partially re-shot and released by ABC Films in October 1997 in Hindi as Sapnay to capitalise on Kajol's popularity in Northern India, earning above average reviews from critics.

After the success of his maiden venture, Menon was signed by producer Kalaipuli S. Thanu to direct a film under his production in the final quarter of 1998. Menon announced he had begun pre-production work on a project titled Theekkul Viralai Vaithal during November 1998, with the title taken from a line by Subramania Bharati. Menon subsequently wanted a bigger storyline and scripted a screenplay based on the Jane Austen novel, Sense and Sensibility and the project was renamed as Kandukondain Kandukondain. Menon claimed that the story of two sisters reflected in the film were reminiscent of him and his brother through difficult parts of their lives. Featuring an ensemble cast of actors including Mammootty, Ajith Kumar, Tabu, Aishwarya Rai and Abbas, the film was highly anticipated prior to release owing to its high production values and popular soundtrack by Rahman. After most of the production was complete in November 1999, Menon wanted a rough copy of the film to be previewed by the village audience first, to ensure that they could relate to the subject, after his previous film failed to fare well in rural areas. After showing parts of the film, they eventually held a group discussion before thanking the volunteers with gifts, while receiving positive feedback.

Made on a budget of ₹4 crore, the film opened to positive reviews from film critics. The Indian Express stated that it was "a progressive film encouraging female independence, yet staying a warm family tale in essence" and that "Kandukondain Kandukondain is the kind of film every intelligent movie-goer ought not to miss", making it "a wonderful watch". The film successfully completed 150 days at the box office in Tamil Nadu, becoming a box office success. Menon chose to bring the film to North Indian audiences too, but opted against dubbing the film and submitted a final copy with English subtitles. He felt that the strong elements of Carnatic music, Subramanya Bharathi's poetry and the ambience of Karaikudi, were exclusively made for a Tamil backdrop. The film was showcased at the Regus London Film Festival in November 2011, and critics from the UK newspaper The Guardian rated it as among the top 12 films out of 270. Critic Peter Bradshaw noted it "is an entertaining reinvention of the novel" and adds that "the richly complicated plot allows it to be exuberantly transposed to modern-day India", ranking it alongside Ang Lee's Crouching Tiger, Hidden Dragon and Cameron Crowe's Almost Famous. Menon showed the film across the world, including having screenings at the Washington Film Festival in April 2001, Locarno Film Festival in August 2002 and the Tiburon International Film Festival in March 2004. Menon discussed the potential of a Hindi version of the film with director Sanjay Leela Bhansali and actor Irrfan Khan but the project did not materialise.

=== Recent projects, 2001–present ===
The release of Menon's second and third feature films were separated by eighteen years. In early 2001, Menon began writing Spin, a Hinglish film based on a real-life relationship between a child with muscular dystrophy and cricketer Anil Kumble, who was set to play the lead role. The project however did not materialise, and he stopped working on revising the script soon after. In 2006, Menon worked on a Hindi adaptation of the comedy drama Fiddler on the Roof, and hoped to sign Amitabh Bachchan to play the lead role. However, the project was put on hold and eventually did not materialise. Menon later narrated a script to Aishwarya Rai and Abhishek Bachchan for a project titled Dhun during late 2008, and the pair agreed to work on the film. The script was inspired by Hrishikesh Mukherjee's Abhimaan (1973) but failed to take off after the actors became busy with other projects. Menon then agreed to work on a biopic of Carnatic singer M. S. Subbulakshmi for producer Somaprasad during January 2012, which would be based on the book MS, A Life In Music by T. J. S. George. However, in February 2013, Menon confirmed that he would begin work on an unrelated project with a similar script and a bigger budget, and that Vidya Balan had agreed to essay the lead role of the singer. Soon after the project was confirmed, Somaprasad filed for a stay on the film's production and subsequently won a court case to prevent Menon from making the film. Apart from writing and scrapping potential film ideas, Menon continued work as a teacher at his film institute and as a director for advertisements. He also worked with Mani Ratnam as the cinematographer for the director's films, Guru (2007) and Kadal (2013).

After a brief gap in feature films, his last directorial Sarvam Thaala Mayam (2019) featured G. V. Prakash Kumar. The film is set in a musical background and tells the story of an aspiring percussionist.

== Style of work ==
Rajiv Menon has worked across several regional film industries in India, contributing towards English, Hindi, Kannada, Tamil and Telugu films. As a multilingual speaker, he revealed that during the making of his first few films, he would think of the dialogues in Malayalam, tape it and send it to writer Sujatha, who would help interpret them into Tamil. Although he has previously stated his desire to make a Malayalam language film, Menon has stated that the larger global reach of Tamil and Hindi films means that he is more regularly associated with such projects.

For films which he has directed, Menon has selected other cinematographers to handle the camera work, despite his own proficiency. In his directorial projects to date, he has worked with Venu, Ravi K. Chandran and Ravi Yadav. Menon stated that he prefers to be available for the cast and crew as a director, and prefers not to have cutters covering him during the process of directing the film.

In the past, Menon has actively turned down acting offers citing that he prefers to concentrate on being behind the screen. He has previously appeared in a supporting role in Fazil's Malayalam comedy drama film, Harikrishnans (1998) starring Mohanlal, Mammootty and Juhi Chawla. Playing the role of Guptan, Menon's character is killed and the entire plot surrounds around the investigation. Regarding his reluctance to accept acting roles, Menon has stated that he had not taken any acting classes, but had worked hard towards becoming a cameraman and a director. He has also expressed his delight at leading an anonymous life, which could change if he were to become recognisable in public spaces.

== Other projects ==
Menon started his career in the field of ad-photography, and then went on to make a number of TV commercials. He entered the field during the early days (1980s) when competition was nil. It was the time when A. R. Rahman decided to do music on his own. They become friends and his creativeness was combined with A. R. Rahman's musical Jingles. He did his first Jingle in a national wide ad with him (Allwyn Trendy Watches). So far, Rajiv has done many ads with A. R. Rahman's Jingles. Noteworthy ones are for Airtel, Colgate, Palmolive, Titan, Asian Paints, Raymonds, Coca-Cola.

Rajiv Menon's production house was ranked No.3 by Economic Times Mumbai in 2006. The next year's ranking saw the company move to No.2. Rajiv Menon's production house is set up in Chennai and his agency clients range from Ogilvy & Mather, Lintas, Rediffusion, Hindustan Thompson Associates, to even smaller ones like Zero Degree Design Studio, Rubecon and Situations Advertising.

His recent work includes a film about seven great Carnatic musicians. This documentary was made for the event of releasing the coffee-table book "Voices Within" by the contemporary musicians T.M Krishna and Bombay Jayashree. The documentary by Rajiv Menon captures the qualities of these music stalwarts.

== Personal life ==
Rajiv Menon is married to a fellow advertising director, Latha, and is based out of Chennai. The pair has two daughters. Menon has described music director A. R. Rahman and director Mani Ratnam as his close friends, and has suggested that he is professionally motivated by his associations with the pair.

== Filmography ==
Year	Title	Credited as			Language	Notes
Year	Title	Director	Cinematographer	Composer	Language	Notes
1991	Chaitanya		Yes		Telugu	
1992	Cheluvi		Yes		Hindi	
1995	Bombay		Yes		Tamil	
1997	Minsara Kanavu	Yes			Tamil	
2000	Kandukondain Kandukondain	Yes			Tamil	
2004	Morning Raga		Yes		English	
2007	Guru		Yes		Hindi	
2013	Kadal		Yes		Tamil	Filmfare Award for Best Cinematographer – Tamil
2019	Sarvam Thaala Mayam	Yes		Yes	Tamil	One song ("Varalaama")
2020	Putham Pudhu Kaalai	Yes			Tamil	Anthology film; segment Reunion
2025	Sumo		Yes		Tamil	
2027	KH×RK (tentative title)		Yes		Tamil	In production; starring Rajinikanth and Kamal Haasan, directed by Nelson Dilipkumar

=== As an actor ===
- Note: all films are in Tamil, unless otherwise noted.

Year	Title	Role	Notes
1997	Minsara Kanavu	Thomas Thangadurai's subordinate	Uncredited role
1998	Harikrishnans	Guptan	Malayalam film
2023	Viduthalai Part 1	A. Subramaniyan	
2024	Weapon	Dev "DK" Krishnav	
2024	Viduthalai Part 2	A. Subramaniyan	
2025	Sabdham	Dr. Daniel	
2026	Patriot	J.P. Sundaram	Malayalam film
2026	Vishwanath & Sons	Vijay Vishwanath	

== Discography ==
=== As playback singer ===
- "Kichu Kichu" – Naina (2002)

=== As composer ===
- 2001 – Ussele Ussele – Tamil pop album featuring singers: Sreenivas, Karthik and Timmy
- Sarvam Thaala Mayam (2019) – one song ("Varalaama")
