= Prasanna (theatre director) =

Indian theatre director and playwright

- Born: 10 February 1951 (age 75); Anavatti
- Education: National School of Drama
- Occupation: Theatre director
- Years active: 1991-present

Prasanna (born 10 February 1951), is a major Indian theatre director and playwright from Karnataka. He is one of the pioneers of modern Kannada theatre. He graduated from the National School of Drama (NSD). He founded Samudaya and gave a creative direction to Kannada theatre in the 1970s with other activists. Prasanna lives in Heggodu in Karnataka. He is known for his organisational skills and new ideas and innovations in theatre. He is a Sangeet Natak Akademi Awardee. He has directed plays for National School of Drama (Repertory Company, NSD), Ninasam, Rangamandal-Bhopal, Rangayana and worked with many theatre organizations of India. He is elected as National President of Indian People's Theatre Association (IPTA).

== Early life ==
Prasanna quit IIT to pursue his passion in theatre. He was inspired into theatre by B.V. Karanth, Prasanna joined the National School Drama (NSD). During the Emergency, he went back to Karnataka and founded Samudaya, a radical theatre movement for workers and masses. He staged street plays, protest plays and propagated their political thought in villages. For a while he was also a visiting faculty at NSD. For a couple of years, he worked for an independent television company in New Delhi. He gave this up and left the capital. That was a phase when Prasanna was disenchanted with theatre and almost gave up on his passion, a man who created well noted stage productions like Tughlaq, Gandhi, etc.

== Direction ==
Girish Karnad's Tughlaq, Gandhi, Life of Galileo, Thai (Brecht's Mother Courage and Her Children), Acharya Tartuf, Lal Ghas Per Neele Ghode (translation -Uday Prakash), Ek Lok Katha, Shakuntalam (Abhijñānaśākuntalam), Fujiyama, Dangeya Munchina Dinagalu, Kadadida Neeru, Uttar Ram Charit, Cupid's Broken Arrow, William Shakespeare's Hamlet, Seema Paar(Play on Bharatendu Harishchandra) etc.

== Playwright ==
He is also a Kannada playwright, novelist, and poet. Some of his dramas are: Uli, Seema Paar, Dangeya Munchina Dinagalu, Ondu Lokada Kathe, Haddu Meerida Haadi, Mahihmapura, Jangamada Badaku.

== Books about acting ==
- Indian Method in Acting
- Acting and beyond

== Work for visual media ==
- Docu-film "Gokak" (V. K. Gokak) for Sahitya Akademi, Delhi
- Creative Director- Taana -Bana (1991), TV Serial produced by Press Trust of India (PTI-TV)
- Worked with ITV

== Awards ==
- B V Karanth award, 2007, National School of Drama
- Sangeet Natak Akademi Award, for Direction, 1999–2000
