= S. M. Zaheer =

Indian character actor (born 1947)

S.M. Zaheer
- Born: 1947 (age 78–79); Ghaziabad, Uttar Pradesh, India
- Other name: Sayed Mohammad Zaheer
- Occupation: Actor
- Website: https://smzaheer.wordpress.com/

S.M. Zaheer is an Indian actor who acts in Hindi films and television.

== Personal life ==
He has been married for more than 50 years to his wife, Shehnaz, and the couple have 3 children: Faraz, Faizi and daughter Sheeba.

== Early life ==
Zaheer was born in Ghaziabad, present day Uttar Pradesh in 1947. He has acted in various feature films, plays, television serials and telefilms.

== Filmography ==
- Satluj (2026) - CM Anant Singh
- Raat Akeli Hai: The Bansal Murders (2025) - Mahinder Bansal
- Haq (2025) - Maulvi A.Q. Quazi
- Naam (2024) - Unspecified
- Yodha (2024) - Anuj Nair
- The Lady Killer (2023) - Vikram Burman
- Blurr (2022) - Rajendra Saha
- Panipat (2019) - Mughal Emperor Alamgir
- Phir Ussi Mod Par (2019) - Munshi Ji
- Kalank (2019) - Doctor treating Satya
- Mango Dreams (2016) - Prashant
- Mr. X (2015) - Chief Minister Dwarakanath Dutta
- Prem Ratan Dhan Payo (2015) - Doctor
- Ya Rab (2014)
- Aarakshan (2011)
- Zokkomon (2011)
- Lafangey Parindey (2010)
- Admissions Open... Do What You Are Born For... (2010)
- My Name Is Khan (2010)
- Coffee House (2009)
- Ishwar Sakshi (2009)
- Veer-Zaara (2004)
- Police Force: An Inside Story (2004)
- Zubeidaa (2001)
- Sangharsh (1999)
- Maachis (1996)
- Sardari Begum (1996)
- Criminal (1995)
- Naajayaz (1995)
- Akayla (1991)
- Jungle Love (1991)
- Ek Ruka Hua Faisla (1986)
- Ab Ayega Mazaa (1984)
- Aao Hajj Karen (1980)

=== TV Serials / Television Films ===
- Sayoneee (2026) as Rajdeep Brar
- Special Ops (2020) (Hotstar Release) as Noor Baksh
- Zindagi Mere Ghar Aana (2020) as Mr Siddique
- Mariam Khan - Reporting Live (2018—2019)
- Ghoul (2018) (Netflix Release)
- Tere Sheher Mein (2015)
- Chintu Chinki Aur Ek Badi Si Love Story (2011)
- Vicky Ki Taxi (2009)
- Chhoti Bahu... Sindoor Bin Suhagan (2009)
- Neem Ka Ped
- Maryada (2009)
- Kayamath (2007)
- Kasturi (2007)
- Meri Doli Tere Angana (2007–08)
- Chotti Bahu (2008-2011)
- Saat Phere (2005)
- Saarrthi (2004)
- 1857 Kranti (2002)
- Daaman (2001)
- Muskaan (1999)
- Badalte Rishte (1996)
- Dastoor (1996)
- Phir Wahi Talash (1989-1990)
- Fakhar Uddin Ali Ahmad (1992)
- Khaali Haath (1991)
- Buniyaad (1986)
- Hum Log (1984)
