= Hayavadana =

1971 Kannada language play by Girish Karnad

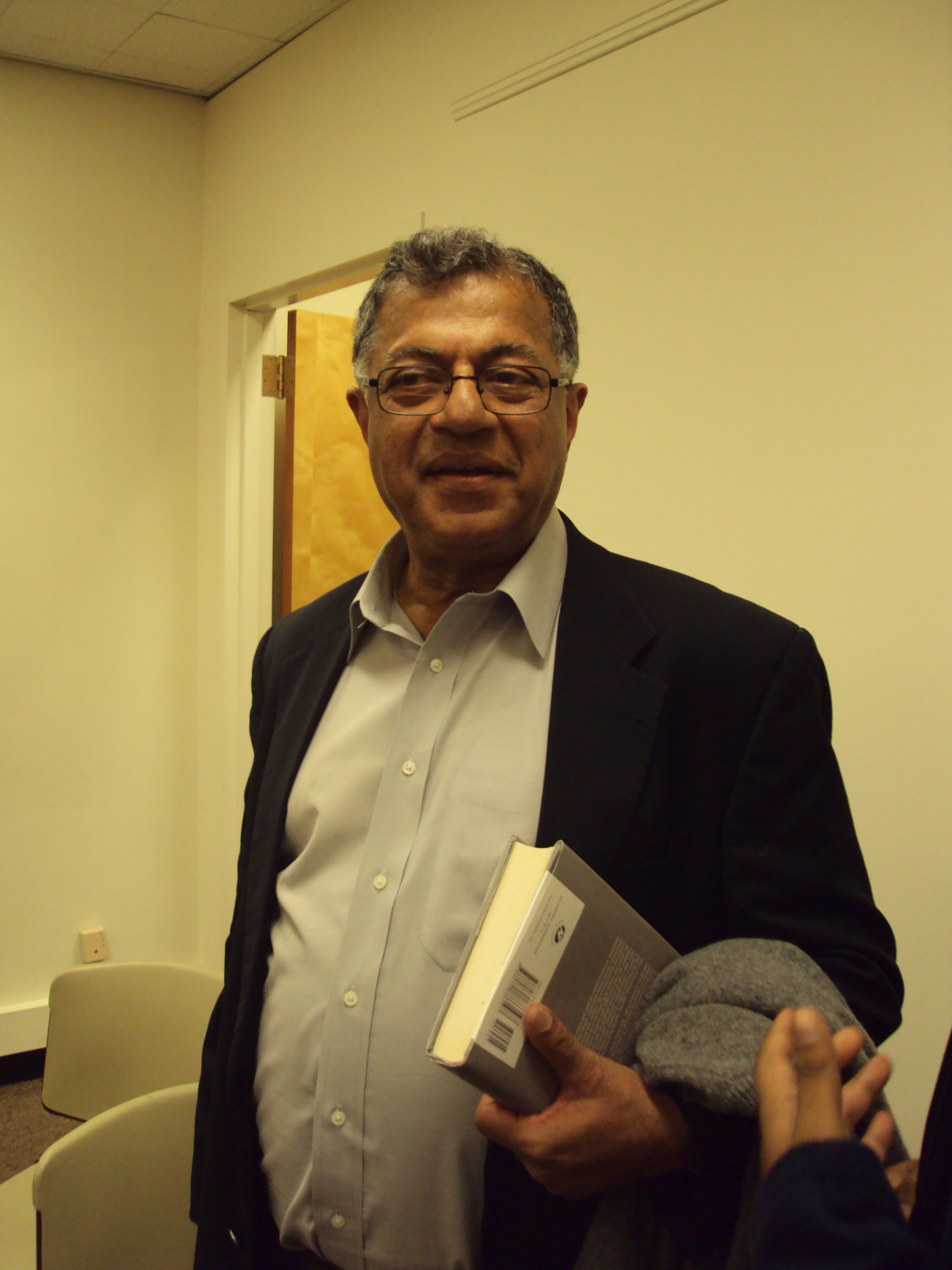
Author Girish Karnad (1938-2019)

Hayavadana (meaning: Horse face) is a 1971 Indian Kannada language two-act play written by Girish Karnad. The plot is based on Br̥hatkathā and Thomas Mann's retelling of Transposed Heads. Its twin play is Nagamandala (1988). Hayavadana presents the story of two friends Devdutta and Kapila; and their love interest Padmini.

== Characters ==
- Bhagwata - the main narrator of the play
- Devdutta - One of the two friends, A man of knowledge
- Kapila - Devdutta's Friend, A man with great physical strength
- Padmini - A beautiful woman, love interest of the two friends
- Hayavadana - A strange creature with the Head of a Horse and body of a man
- Actor-1 - An assistant to Bhagwata
- Goddess Kali - the Goddess who brings Devdutta and Kapila back to life.
- The Boy - Son of Devdutta and Padmini
- Vidyasagar (only referenced) - Devdutta's father

== Plot ==
=== Act - I ===
The play opens with worship to Lord Ganesha. Bhagwata comes to the stage. He is a character in the Play and also is the narrator of the play. He seeks blessings from Lord Ganesha for the successful performance of the play. Through his narration, he takes the audience to a place, called as Dharampur and introduces the audience to the king Dharmsheel. Then he puts up some rhetorical questions on incompleteness of man and God; and also on the perfection of a man. During his narration, he introduces two characters who are mutual friends. The first one is Devdutta. He is a sharp minded and highly intellectual person. He has defeated poets and Pandits with his knowledge. He is a son of Brahmin. The second one is Kapila. He is a muscular man. He has a great physical strength and he is a son of Lohar (Black Smith). Both Devdutta and Kapila are in contrast as the former lacks power and strength, the latter lacks knowledge and intellect. According to the playwright, the head of Devdutta (knowledge) and the body of Kapila (physical strength) accomplish a complete man. The narrator compares their pair to the pair of Ram-Laxman, Luv-Kush and Krishna-Balram. All these are the pairs of great brothers in Hindu mythology.

A character, Actor-1 appears on the stage shouting and running towards Bhagwata. He tells Bhagwata that he has just seen a strange creature that looks like a horse (by face) but speaks like a man. That creature has the head of a horse and the rest of the body of a man. Without paying any heed to his talks, Bhagwata asks him to prepare for the play. But he runs away from the stage and soon after he returns shouting again. Now a strange creature appears on the stage. As earlier described by the Actor-1, the creature has the head of a horse and the body of a man. For a moment, Bhagwata thinks that someone is wearing the mask of horse. He tries to remove the mask but realizes that it is truly half a man and a half horse. Now the creature starts to introduce itself before Bhagwata, Actor-1 and the audience.

The creature introduces himself as Hayavadana and starts to narrate his story. He tells that once upon a time, a princess had to choose a groom for her marriage. So many Princes approached from far and wide. But the princess fell in love with a horse of an Arabian Prince. She became desperate to marry that horse. Eventually her parents allowed her to do so. She was married to the horse. After 15 years of their marriage, the horse transformed into a celestial being. Now the princess rejected him as her husband. That celestial being cursed her to be a Mare (female horse) and she became so. The princess give birth to Hayavadana. Now Hayavadana wants to get rid of this cursed life. Bhagwata asks him to go to goddess Kali temple in Chitrkut. He also asks the Actor-1 to accompany him on the way. They leave.

Now Bhagwata moves ahead with the story of the play. Devdutta and Kapila appear on the stage. Devdutta tells Kapila that he wants to marry a woman, namely Padmini. With utmost desire to marry Padmini, he pledges to sacrifice his arms to Goddess Kali and his head to Rudra. Kapila goes to Padmini and presents the Proposal to marry Devdutta. Devdatta and Padmini Marry. By the time, Devdutta realizes that Padmini is attracted towards Kapila and vice versa. Now Padmini is pregnant. Devdutta knowingly tries to put off the program of visiting Ujjain. He tells Kapila that Padmini is ill. But Padmini gives her consent before Kapila. They all three leave for Ujjain. Padmini repeatedly praises Kapila's physical strength before Devdutta. Devdutta feels jealous but he does not blame Padmini. Kapila and Padmini go to Rudra Temple but Devdutta denies to accompany them. Devdutta knows that Kapila has such a physical strength and beauty that he can attract any woman. Devdutta goes to goddess Kali temple where he reminds himself of his pledge to sacrifice his head to the Goddess Kali. He wishes for the wellness of Kapila and Padmini. He beheads himself with a sword and dies.

Meanwhile, Kapila and Padmini come out of the temple. Kapila worries on not finding Devdutta. He leaves Padmini and searches for his friend. Finally he reaches in the same Temple and feels shocked to see his friend dead. He feels himself responsible for all this. Kapila takes the same sword and beheads himself. Soon Padmini reaches there and she has no clue how they died. She considers herself responsible for the duel between the two friends and their deaths. She provokes the Goddess Kali and also tries to kill herself. The Goddess Kali appears and stops her. The Goddess asks her to place the heads with their respective body so that the Goddess will rejoin them with her magical powers and bring them back to life. The Goddess also appreciates the two friends. Padmini follows the command in a hurry. The Goddess disappears. Padmini, being thankful to goddess kali, relaxes. But soon she realizes her mistake. She has mistakenly placed the heads with irrespective body. So now Devdutta's head is joined with Kapila's body and vice versa. Soon they regain their senses. Momentarily, the two friends are confused. Both make a claim for Padmini. The man with Devdutta's head, makes a plea that head is the master of the body. So he has the right over Padmini. The man with Kapila's head makes a plea that Padmini has remained with Devdutta's body. So he has the right over Padmini. Meanwhile Bhagwata, the narrator, comes on the stage. All the characters become statues for a moment and the narrator addresses the audience. He asks them to think of a solution to this problem. Act 1 ends.

=== Act - II ===
The act begins as the narrator repeats the same question- "What is the solution?". He also talks about the story of Vikramaditya and Betaal where the king Vikrama replies to Betaal that the mind (head) is the master of the body. It is head that gives recognition to an individual. Bhagwata suggests the three of them go to a hermit seeking a solution for this problem. The words of the hermit are heard on the stage that Devdutta's head is the Swami (husband) of Padmini. Devdutta and Padmini accept this in delight. Kapila, being disappointed, leaves for the forest. The time passes. Devdutta brings some dolls. These dolls also play the role of narrator. He starts losing his physical strength and as a result they are losing mutual interest. A child is born. Devduta goes to buy new dolls from the fair in Ujjain. Bhagwata again appears on the stage and tells that Kapila has regained his physical strength. Padmini meets him in the forest and also tells him that it is Kapila's son as it is born from Kapila's body. But Kapila does not accept it. Being a little reluctant, they prepare to fulfill their physical desires.

In search of his wife, Devdutta reaches there in the forest. Finding them together, he finds himself the similar situation as he was before. To put an Ultimate end to this problem, Devdutta takes out the sword and challenges Kapila for a duel. Both are killed. Padmini finds herself lonely. Bhagwata comes there and she hands him over the child and the same dolls. She asks him to hand it over to Devdutta's Brahmin father Vidyasagar after five years. She leaves the stage by declaring that she is going to perform Sati. Bhagwata decides to end the play with his speech. A loud shout is heard on the stage. Actor-1 comes and claims that he has heard Hayavadana chanting National Anthem and patriotic songs. Then Actor-2 appears with Devdutta's son of age 5 now. The boy has two dolls. Hayavadana comes there. Bhagwata and Actor-2 are talking lightly and creating fun. They all start laughing. That boy too starts laughing and the dolls slip out of his hand. Bhagwata says that the boy hasn't expressed any emotions of happiness, anger, sorrow in past 5 years. Today he is smiling just because of Hayavadana.

Now Hayavadana tells his story. when he was trying to behead himself in the temple, the goddess Kali appeared. Hayavadana tells his desire. The goddess Kali without listening to him fully, gives him blessings. Hayavadana becomes a complete Horse instead of becoming a complete man. Yet he is unsatisfied. He still has the ability to speak like a man. He wants to lose this voice. He is singing the national Anthem as he believes that people who sing the national anthem, lose their voice early. Meanwhile, he sobs. The boy starts singing a tragic song which was chanted by his mother, Padmini. Hayavadana tries to laugh and his voice completely changes to a horse's. Now Hayavadana is a complete horse.

Bhagwata asks the Actor to go to brahmin Vidyasagar and inform him that his grandson is coming to him, riding on a great horse. Bhagwata thanks Lord Ganesha for the successful performance of the play.
