= Chaitanya (film) =

- Theatrical release poster
- Directed by: Pratap Pothen
- Screenplay by: Pratap Pothen
- Story by: Pratap Pothen
- Dialogues by: Singeetham Srinivasa Rao
- Produced by: Sathyam Babu
- Starring: Nagarjuna; Gautami; Girish Karnad; Kota Srinivasa Rao
- Cinematography: Rajiv Menon
- Edited by: B. Lenin; V. T. Vijayan
- Music by: Ilaiyaraaja
- Production company: Sri Tirumalesa Productions
- Release date: 7 May 1991
- Running time: 119 minutes
- Country: India
- Language: Telugu

Chaitanya is a 1991 Indian Telugu-language action road film, written and directed by Pratap Pothen in his only Telugu directorial ever. Produced by Sathyam Babu, the film Starred Nagarjuna, Gautami, and Girish Karnad in pivotal roles and with music composed by Ilaiyaraaja. It was simultaneously dubbed into Tamil as Madras To Goa.

== Plot ==
Chaitanya is the chief mechanic for the upcoming Roots Challenge 1991 Automotive rally race – which starts via the route from Chennai coast to Goa coast, a route which is noted for illegal drug trade and arms trafficking. Retired Major Harischandra Prasad is the chief guest for the rally, and his daughter Padmini also competes for the Roots Challenge Trophy.

Chaitanya's journalist friend Sudhakar witnesses the murder of the city D.I.G. in a park. The D.I.G.'s murder happens to have been planned by an underworld gangster. Later, Sudhakar is murdered by a gang near his garage because he witnessed the murder of the D.I.G. Chaitanya finds himself beaten by the gang after he comes to the assistance of Sudhakar. When he regains his senses, he finds himself with a revolver in his hand and in police custody, arrested and charged with the homicide of the friend he tried to assist. With evidence pointing toward his guilt, he has virtually no defense and may well spend the rest of his life in prison or be hanged. He manages to escape from the jail with the help of Chaitanya's garage assistant, Golconda (a drunkard), through the journalist's friend (Joseph) in a water tanker. Disguised as the journalist's friend, the gangster's henchman is hidden in the tanker.

The police commissioner, who is a close associate of Harischandra Prasad, attempts to solve the mysterious murder of D.I.G. and the journalist. The criminal's henchman plans to blast the water tanker and kill Chaitanya, who flees from Srungavarapukota prison in the same water tanker. But, after a battle with the henchman inside the water tanker, Chaitanya escapes and jumps from the water tanker into a lake, and the henchman dies in the water tanker explosion. Police sent Chaitanya's case to CBI as they concluded that it was Chaitanya who was killed in the blast. Chaitanya gets to participate in the One Halt Race by joining at a milestone on the route in the guise of the garage assistant's race car. He finds out that the photographs of D.I.G.'s murder caught by his journalist friend are hidden in one of the three cars of the rally. In another twist, Padmini happens to drive the car in which 1 photograph was hidden.

How Chaitanya unweaves the mystery behind all this crime and how Padmini & Chaitanya fall in love in the process and identify the high-profile criminal adds to the rest of the plot and suspense in the film. Three people killed the D.I.G.. According to the pictures, the guy in the brown coat is the police commissioner, who claims to be a gangster. The police commissioner forces Harischandra and Padmini to join the drug trade. Chaitanya manages to reach the commissioner's safehouse, where it's revealed that Harischandra's a high-profile criminal. The commissioner didn't know that someone else was the mafia boss. Harischandra kills the commissioner. When Chaitanya shows up, he realizes that Padmini's father is the gangster who is responsible for the illegal drug trade, arms trafficking, DIG's murder, and Sudhakar's murder. He orders his gang to frame Chaitanya. The film ends with Chaitanya killing Harishchandra, the gangster when he attempts to shoot him.

== Cast ==
- Nagarjuna as Chaitanya
- Gautami as Padmini
- Girish Karnad as Harischandra Prasad
- Kota Srinivasa Rao as Commissioner KJ Prabhakar
- Raghuvaran as Raana
- Babu Antony as Cobra
- Silk Smitha as Smitha
- Chinna as Journalist Sudhakar
- Nizhalgal Ravi as Smuggler
- Chinni Jayanth as Smuggler
- Ravi Teja as Racer
- Suthi Velu as Detective
- Raavi Kondala Rao as Roots Rally Company MD
- P. J. Sarma as IG
- Vijayachander as DIG Ram Mohan Rao
- Bhimeswara Rao as Jailor
- KK Sarma as Police Officer
- Telephone Satyanarayana as Doordharshan Reporter

== Production ==
The film was shot in Chennai, Ooty, Kasaragod, and Goa with production designed handled by Thota Tharani, and stunts choreographed by Vikram Dharma.

== Soundtrack ==
Chaitanya

Film score by Ilaiyaraaja
- Released: 1991
- Genre: Soundtrack
- Length: 24:35
- Label: Echo Music

Ilaiyaraaja chronology
Nirnayam (1991)	Chaitanya (1991)	Surya IPS (1991)

Music was composed by Ilaiyaraaja. Lyrics were written by Veturi. The music released via ECHO Music Company.

Track listing
No.	Title	Singer(s)	Length
1.	"Oho Laila"	S. P. Balasubrahmanyam	4:56
2.	"Kanne Lady"	S. P. Sailaja	4:57
3.	"Paapa Eddu"	S. P. Balasubrahmanyam	4:51
4.	"Sweety"	S. P. Balasubrahmanyam, S. Janaki	4:55
5.	"Vayase Tholi"	S. P. Balasubrahmanyam, S. Janaki	4:53
Total length:			24:35
