= Sarvam Thaala Mayam =

2019 Tamil-language musical drama film

- Theatrical release poster
- Directed by: Rajiv Menon
- Written by: Rajiv Menon
- Produced by: Latha Menon
- Starring: G. V. Prakash Kumar; Nedumudi Venu; Aparna Balamurali; Vineeth; Kumaravel
- Cinematography: Ravi Yadav
- Edited by: Anthony
- Music by: Original Songs: A. R. Rahman; Rajiv Menon (One song); Background score: A. R. Rahman; Qutub-E-Kripa
- Production company: mindscreen CINEMAS
- Distributed by: Jio Studios; Sakthi Film Factory
- Release date: 1 February 2019
- Running time: 130 minutes
- Country: India
- Language: Tamil

Sarvam Thaala Mayam (transl. Omnipresence of Rhythm) is a 2019 Indian Tamil-language musical drama film written and directed by Rajiv Menon. The film stars G. V. Prakash Kumar and Aparna Balamurali, with a supporting cast including Nedumudi Venu, Vineeth, Kumaravel, Santha Dhananjayan, and Dhivyadharshini. The film has music composed by A. R. Rahman, cinematography by Ravi Yadav, and editing by Anthony.

Menon makes a comeback, having directed his last film 19 years ago. The film released on 1 February 2019. The film was a box office success.

== Plot ==
This is a story about when the lives of a famous mridangam player named Vembu Iyer and his student Peter Johnson, son of an expert mridangam maker named Johnson and a crazy Vijay fan, collide.

Earlier Peter is a care-free brat who neither has any interest in his father's mridangam making business nor in his own career. He starts wooing a nurse called Saara who keeps some distance from him due to his approach. Then one day, on his father's insistence he goes to deliver mridangam to Vembu Iyer's concert where he is allowed to watch his program. After observing Iyer's concert, Peter starts admiring him and decides to join as a student to learn mridangam from him.

After observing Peter, Iyer understands that he has talent but rejects him due to his lack of discipline and consistency. To prove Iyer wrong, Peter tries hard to change himself, which concerned his mother who was worried about his future. Finally Iyer allows Peter as his student.

Peter is mistreated by Iyer's assistant Mani because of his lower caste. This is noticed by Iyer, who warns Mani to be good with his students. Mani confesses his dissatisfaction over Iyer, saying he did not support his career as a mridangam player and used him. This angers Iyer, who sacks him from the job in front of Peter, so Mani swears revenge on Iyer and Peter for his humiliation.

Peter becomes good friends with Nandagopal 'Nandu', a NRI and a Harvard University PhD drop-out who came to learn mridangam from Iyer. Meanwhile, Mani joins as a judge in a classical music instrument reality show called 'Sangeetha Samrat' with the help of his younger sister Anjana who is a crooked socialite and works as a VJ. Peter is very passionate about the beats of mridangam and becomes one of the favourite students of Iyer. Meanwhile, Saara realises her love for Peter and they start dating.

Anjana sets a trap to humiliate Iyer. She invites Nandu to perform on her reality show and makes him believe that it was telecasted only in the USA. Nandu comes along with Peter, who consistently warns him to not perform without their teacher's permission. After knowing that it was a trap to humiliate them, Nandu leaves the place without any warning to Peter. Without knowing the facts, Peter enters the studio to find Nandu, but he is focused on "live". Then with no option left, Peter gets ready to play mridangam which gets severely humiliated by Mani and Anjana, making him seem useless and directly criticise Iyer. After learning of this, Iyer questions Peter on why he went to perform on the stage. Peter takes the blame on himself to save Nandu. The angered Iyer sends Peter away saying that it is a real humiliation for his musical knowledge for believing in such a useless student.

Later at Nandu's home, Nandu blames Peter for his mistakes and Peter challenges Nandu saying that he will be overpowered by him one day. After these events, Peter became depressed and started taking drugs, which worries his parents. This is noticed by Saara who takes him to her home. Later she makes him realise that the music is everywhere and built in nature and encourages him to explore the world to learn Thaalam (beats). Inspired by these words, Peter starts a journey on his own way to learn different types of beat instruments.

Meanwhile, the Sangeetha Samrat show becomes successful after completion of 2 successful seasons and all of Iyer's students including Nandu are fascinated over the popularity and leave him. Finally Iyer understands that he needs to mend his ways according to the world or else he cannot transfer his musical knowledge to the further generations. He realises that Peter is his heir for his knowledge of music and calls him back.

Peter happily joins him back to continue learn mridangam to win the show and gain his teacher's respect back. Meanwhile, Nandu joins hands with Mani and started taking training from him to win the show. After learining that Iyer is also showing interest in this show and that Peter is also participating in this show, the duo become cautious. However Peter and Nandu managed to reach the finals in the program. Before starting the show, Peter forgets the beats that Iyer had taught him but surprisingly these are answered by Nandu to Iyer. Then Mani comes in front of them and challenges Iyer. He says that he will prove that he is a better teacher than Iyer and will humiliate both Iyer and Peter in front of everyone as revenge for his humiliation. This is why he has trained Nandu well in all of Iyer's compositions to counter them. After hearing this Iyer advises Peter to stay on the same strategy.

In the show while countering Nandu, Peter remembers different beats of instrumental music that he has learned from the world and applies all the beats in the mridangam which gives joy to the audience. With no option left, Mani decides to declare Peter as the winner in the show which shocked Nandu. Later Iyer leaves the stage which makes Peter afraid that his teacher is angry with him for not following his strategy. But Iyer feels proud of him and happily claims Peter as his student. The film ends with Peter, now a celebrity, performing along with his teacher Iyer.

== Cast ==
- G. V. Prakash Kumar as Peter Johnson
- Nedumudi Venu as Vembhu Iyer
- Aparna Balamurali as Nurse Saramma 'Sara'
- Dhivyadharshini as Anjana
- Vineeth as Manivasagam Iyer
- Kumaravel as Johnson
- Ravi Prakash as Krish Gopalakrishnan, Nandu's father
- Sumesh S. Narayanan as Nandagopal 'Nandu'
- Aadhira Pandilakshmi as Theresa Johnson
- Santha Dhananjayan as Abhirami
- Sikkil Gurucharan as Vedaraman
- Director Marimuthu as Police Officer
- Srinivas Moorthy as Thupakki Thyagu
- Raj Kamal as Hari
- Spike John as Velu
- Krish Haran as Kumar
- Bala Singh as Gokul Raj

=== Guest appearances ===
- Sandy as himself
- Unni Krishnan as himself
- Srinivas as himself
- Karthik as himself
- Sadanam Vasudevan as himself
- Bombay Jayashri as herself

== Production ==
In March 2016, it was widely reported in the media that Rajiv Menon would begin work on his third directorial venture, after he had taken a sabbatical from the profession following the release of his previous film, Kandukondain Kandukondain (2000). Titled Sarvam Thaala Mayam, G. V. Prakash Kumar was signed on to play the lead role of a percussionist in the film, while A. R. Rahman was selected to compose the film's music. Pre-production work took place in mid-2016, and the team finalised Sai Pallavi to play the female lead role. Other actors including Nedumudi Venu and Cheenu Mohan were also approached to play key roles in the film, but production failed to take off in November 2016 as planned and the project was delayed.

In March 2017, Menon denied that the film was dropped and noted that a promotional photo shoot with Prakash Kumar was imminent. Prakash Kumar revealed that the story was set in two states and was inspired by incidents from the lives of real musicians. During the period, Prakash Kumar also took professional mridangam lessons from percussionist Umayalpuram Sivaraman to equip himself for the character. After further brief delays, the film was officially launched on 29 November 2017 and the shoot began thereafter. Sai Pallavi's unavailability meant that the team replaced her with Aparna Balamurali, after Menon was impressed with her performance in the Malayalam film, Maheshinte Prathikaaram (2016), and called her for a successful audition. An ensemble cast of Nedumudi Venu, Santha Dhananjayan, Vineeth, Kumaravel, Sumesh and Athira was also announced with the launch, while Ravi Yadav and Anthony were confirmed as the film's cinematographer and editor respectively. Actress Dhivyadharshini also later joined the film during the first schedule, which carried on until the end of 2017.

== Reception ==
M. Suganth of The Times of India rated the film three-and-a-half out of five stars and wrote, "The narrative is fleet-footed and doesn’t let the seriousness of its themes weigh the film down. And the film is refreshingly visual, despite being a drama." Giving the same rating, Karthik Kumar of Hindustan Times wrote, "Sarvam Thaala Mayam works fittingly both as a musical drama and an allegory about music for all, and it works because it never sensationalizes what it sets out to achieve."

S. Subhakeerthana of The Indian Express gave the film three-and-a-half out of five stars and wrote, "I would have loved Sarvam Thaala Mayam more if Rajiv hadn’t brought in the reality show-angle in the second half. I felt those portions were forceful and a tad orchestrated. I would have loved to see more of Iyer’s transformation, and how he adapted himself to the times." Janani K. of India Today gave the film three out of five stars and wrote, "The first half of Sarvam Thaala Mayam is terrific and Rajiv Menon proves he's brilliant at his craft. But the film loses steam in the second half. It takes a convenient route by including a reality show angle."

Priyanka Thirumurthy of The News Minute wrote, "While the actors have delivered excellent performances, the film fails to question systemic oppression." Shubhra Gupta of The Indian Express gave the film three out of five stars and wrote, "this is a film which isn’t scared of striking the gong for important things: breaking barriers, forgoing illiberalism, and embracing differences, and doing it via music (taal), which is everywhere (sarvam), and belongs to us all (mayam)."

Srinivasa Ramanujam of The Hindu wrote, "STM is Rajiv’s best directorial yet, proving that beauty lies not just in the colourful clothes or the picturesque frames, but also in a storyline filled with aspiration and hope." Sreedhar Pillai of Firstpost wrote, "Despite a rushed second half, Sarvam Thaala Mayam is a joyful, breezy and emotional film that pulls at your heartstrings."
