= The Dreams of Tipu Sultan =

Tipu Sultan Kanda Kanasu (English: The Dreams of Tipu Sultan) is a 1997 Kannada play written by Girish Karnad. The play has been performed many times by different groups around the world but mostly in India and Pakistan. The story follows the last days as well as the historic moments in the life of Tipu Sultan, the ruler of the Kingdom of Mysore, through the eyes of an Indian court historian and a British Oriental scholar. Karnad wrote the play after it was commissioned by BBC Radio, and it was broadcast in Britain on 15 August 1997, the 50th anniversary of India's independence.

Karnad's play is based on a Farsi manuscript written by Tipu Sultan in his own handwriting and preserved in the India Office Library. It was later translated and published as The Dreams of Tipu Sultan. In this text, Tipu recorded some of his dreams from 1785 to 1798. Several of the dreams are about defeating the unbelievers, the Marathas and the Nazarenes (i.e, the English), and visions of the Prophet, the companions of the Prophet and Islamic sages.

Karnad's play uses four of the 37 dreams for his play: Dream 9, Dream 10, Dream 13 and fourth one as having victory over the British. Mir Hussain Ali Khan Kirmani (active 1781–1802), who wrote "History of Tipu Sultan: Being a Continuation of The Neshani Hyduri" (an English Translation appeared in 1864), is also a character in Girish Karnad's play.

The Jordanian scholars Khawaldeh and Neimneh conclude in an article that "what Karnad wishes to achieve, through this counter-historical theatrical project, is to dismantle the image of the ruthless and unprincipled 'Other' propagated by British historians, dramatists, and performers by creating or even recreating an alternative humane and noble character of Tipu Sultan."

== See also ==
- Tipu Sultan

== Translations ==
- Collected Plays: Taledanda, the Fire and the Rain, the Dreams of Tipu Sultan, Flowers and Images: Two Dramatic Monologues: Flowers : Broken Images, Vol. 2. Oxford University Press, USA. 2005. ISBN 978-0-19-567311-1
