= K. Bikram Singh =

K. Bikram Singh (26 May 1938 – 12 May 2013) was an Indian politician and filmmaker, most known for his documentary film, Satyajit Ray Introspections (1991) and feature film, Tarpan (1994). After a short stint as a lecturer in history, he joined the Indian Railway Traffic Service in 1962. During his service with the Government of India, he has held many important positions, including Joint Director, of Food Corporation of India, Joint Director Planning (Railway Board), Joint Director of Film Festivals and Director of film Policy in the Ministry of Information and Broadcasting, Government of India

== Early life and background ==
Singh did his M.A. in Political Science in 1958 and M.A. in History in 1960 from University of Delhi.

== Career ==
Singh briefly taught history and joined the Indian Railway Traffic Service in 1962, where he worked for 21 years. Initially he worked for Indian Railways and then for the Directorate of Film Festivals. In 1983 Singh took voluntary retirement from the Government of India service to focus on filmmaking.

He made his debut film as a director and screenwriter in 1994, Tarpan, starring Om Puri, Revathy and Manohar Singh in the lead role. It was screened at Moscow International Film Festival, Montreal World Film Festival, Chicago International Film Festival and Cairo International Film Festival.

In addition to his films, Singh produced over sixty documentaries for film and television with a large number of films on painters and painting.

In November 2008, his landmark book on the painter M.F. Husain called MAQBOOL FIDA HUSAIN was published. It reviews the artist's work from 1947 to 2007. This has been hailed as a definitive book on the work of M.F. Husain to date and a major contribution to the writing on contemporary Indian art by people like E. Alkazi, Yashodhara Dalmia (Outlook), Gayatri Sinha (Asian Age), Aveek Sen (The Telegraph), Chitrapu Uday Bhaskar (The Hindu), Kishore Singh (Business Standard) and M.F. Husain himself.

He wrote a fortnightly column on life, society and the arts called BIMB PRATIBIMB in the reputed Hindi daily JANSATTA from 2001 to 2009. Two books of his articles in this column called ‘Kuchh Gamein Dauran’ and ‘Aur Bhi Gham Hain’ have been published. ‘Kuchh Gamein Dauran’ had won Sahityik Kriti Sammaan of Delhi Hindi Academy in 2005.

Since early 2008, he has also written a column on arts, culture, literature and cinema in major Hindi daily Hindustan under PARTEIN. A collection of his articles in Hindustan has been published in book form called "Baaki Samay".

== Personal life ==
Singh was married to Urmila Singh and had two children, a son Rishi and a daughter Ruchi.

== Partial filmography ==
- Andhi Gali, producer and associate director
- New Delhi Times, 1986, producer
- Tarpan, 1994, writer, producer and director

== Awards ==
Singh won an Aravindan Award as best debut director for Tarpan.
