= Mere Ghar Aayi Ek Nanhi Pari =

- Genre: Drama
- Written by: Preiti Mamgain
- Directed by: Rakesh Malhotra
- Starring: Mugdha Chaphekar; Karan Wahi
- Theme music composer: Lalit Sen
- Opening theme: "Mere Ghar Aayi Ek Nanhi Pari" by Kumar Sanu
- Country of origin: India
- Original language: Hindi
- No. of seasons: 01
- No. of episodes: 403

Production
- Executive producer: Dharam Singh
- Producers: Tony Singh & Deeya Singh
- Cinematography: Sunil Vishwakarma
- Editors: Santosh Singh & Sujeet Das
- Camera setup: Multi-camera
- Running time: Approx. 24 minutes
- Production company: DJ's a Creative Unit

Original release
- Network: Colors TV
- Release: 9 March – 3 September 2009

Mere Ghar Aayi Ek Nanhi Pari (transl. A Little Angel Came To My House) is an Indian television series which premiered on 9 March 2009 on Colors TV. The story revolves around a family who experience the birth of a daughter after long 18 years.

== Plot ==
The story revolves around Roshan Chawla, a popular sweet shopkeeper in Delhi whose children were all males yet he yearned for a girl from his expecting a daughter. And after all, his expectations came true- he had a granddaughter, named Chandni for whom he had been waiting since forty years, and the whole family rejoices. But their joy was unaware of the upcoming turmoil they had to face- while Chandni was still an infant, she was bereft of her mother who was killed in a riot, leaving his father mentally disturbed. As she grows up, she not only falls in love with Rajveer, a charming young man, but also has the responsibility of sustaining her father. But her love story with Rajveer was not easy, as it still had obstacles to face.

Chandni falls in love with Rajveer during the Goa trip. Chandni got married with Paramjeet, a boy who tells her he is from Canada but he lies to the innocent girl's family for money. Paramjeet takes the girl to a village and lives at their house pretending to Chandni's family that they are in canada. He is also married already to another lady which Chandni finds out about when she gets married. Chandni's family thinks that she is happy in Canada with her husband. One day however, Rajveer discovers the truth about Chandni, he finds her and saves her by calling the police and exposing the truth to her family. Later they get married.

== Cast ==
- Mugdha Chaphekar as Chandni Chawla
- Karan Wahi as Rajveer Malhotra
- Kulbhushan Kharbanda as Roshanlal Chawla (Lalaji)
- Sachin Khurana as Karan Chawla
- Vaishnavi Mahant as Neeru Karan Chawla / Neeru Girish Chawla
- Pankaj Berry as Girish Chawla
- Rajeev Paul
- Akshay Anand as Mr. Chawla (Chandni's father)
- Anjali Mukhi as Kusum Chawla
- Manoj Bidwai as Paramjeet
- Jayshree Arora as Guneeta Ramlall Chawla
- Trishikha Tripathi as Simmi
- Yamini Singh
- Indraneel Bhattacharya
- Diya Sonecha as Child Chandni Chawla
