= Odakalu Bimba =

- Original language: Kannada
- Written by: Girish Karnad
- Characters: Manjula Nayak (Kannada and Hindi), Manjula Sharma (Shabana Azmi version)
- Setting: Bangalore

Premiere
- Date: 2005
- Place: Rangashankara, Bangalore
- Directed by: Girish Karnad and KM Chaitanya

Odakalu Bimba is a Kannada monodrama by Indian playwright and author Girish Karnad. It was written in 2005 and marked Karnad's return to direction after a period of thirty years. He directed the play with KM Chaitanya

It was translated and titled Bikhre Bimb in Hindi and A Heap of Broken Images in English. It starred Arundhati Nag as Manjula Nayak and her doppelgänger in the Kannada and Hindi versions while Arundhati Raja played the same role in the English version.

The plot revolves around the protagonist Manjula Nayak who is an unsuccessful writer in Kannada and finds success with her novel written in English. Her doppelgänger later questions her about her choice to write in English rather than in her own language and the betrayal of her own language.

The play earned itself positive reviews which subsequently resulted in a new production of it in English which was directed by Alyque Padamsee and featured Shabana Azmi playing the lead role of Manjula Sharma, a Hindi writer who is unsuccessful.

The play won the awards for Best Playwright and Best Director while Nag won the Best Actress award for her role at the Mahindra Excellence in Theatre Awards in 2008.

Karnad got the idea to write the play when he attended a talk in Bangalore by Shashi Deshpande, daughter of Kannada writer Shriranga, on Indian writers who wrote in English not being treated on par with English writers of foreign origin.

The play was originally performed at Bangalore. The Kannada version of the play were performed all across Karnataka, while the Hindi version was performed across different cities in India including Delhi, Chennai, Chandigarh and Thiruvananthapuram. The English version featuring Azmi was performed in the United States where it was received positively.

The play was produced by and originally performed at Ranga Shankara, Bangalore which was built in honour of Nag's late husband Shankar Nag.
