= Girish Karnad =

Indian playwright, actor, director, and writer (1938–2019)

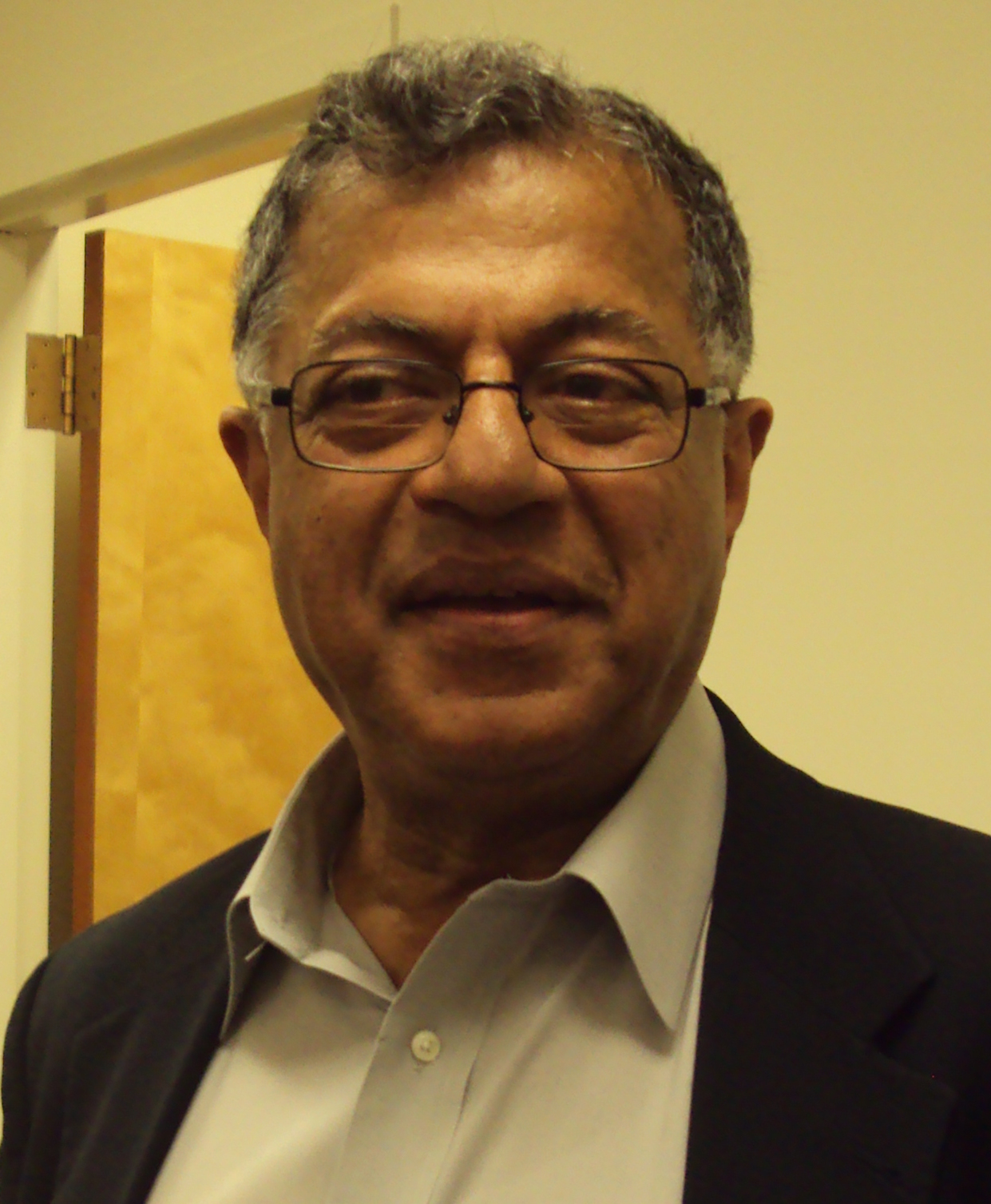
- Girish Karnad at Cornell University, 2009
- Born: Girish Raghunath Karnad; 19 May 1938; Matheran, Bombay Presidency, British India (now in Maharashtra, India)
- Died: 10 June 2019 (aged 81); Bengaluru, Karnataka, India
- Education: Karnatak University; Magdalen College, Oxford
- Occupations: Playwright; director; actor
- Spouse: Saraswathy Ganapathy
- Children: Raghu Karnad, Shalmali Radha
- Writing career
- Period: 1961–2019
- Genre: Drama
- Notable works: Tughlaq; Taledanda; Ajit Shenoy in YRF Spy Universe; Swami's Father (Srinivasan) in Malgudi Days
- Movement: Navya

Girish Raghunath Kārnād (19 May 1938 – 10 June 2019) was an Indian playwright, actor, film director, writer, and a Jnanpith awardee, who predominantly worked in Kannada, Hindi, Tamil, Telugu, Malayalam and Marathi films. His rise as a playwright in the 1960s marked the coming of age of modern Indian playwriting in Kannada, just as Badal Sarkar did in Bengali, Vijay Tendulkar in Marathi, and Mohan Rakesh in Hindi. He was a recipient of the 1998 Jnanpith Award, the highest literary honour conferred in India.

A bust of Girish Karnad at Dr. Rajkumar Children's Park (Jinke Park), Bengaluru (2026)

For four decades Karnad composed plays, often using history and mythology to tackle contemporary issues. He translated his plays into English and received acclaim. His plays have been translated into some Indian languages and directed by directors like Ebrahim Alkazi, B. V. Karanth, Alyque Padamsee, Prasanna, Arvind Gaur, Satyadev Dubey, Vijaya Mehta, Shyamanand Jalan, Amal Allana and Zafer Mohiuddin.

He was active in the world of Indian cinema working as an actor, director and screenwriter, in Hindi and Kannada cinema, and has earned awards.

He was conferred Padma Shri and Padma Bhushan by the Government of India and won four Filmfare Awards, of which three are Filmfare Award for Best Director – Kannada and the fourth a Filmfare Best Screenplay Award. He was a presenter for a weekly science magazine programme called "Turning Point" that aired on Doordarshan in 1991.

== Early life and education ==
Girish Karnad was born in a Konkani-speaking Chitrapur Saraswat Brahmin family of Matheran, in present-day Maharashtra, in 1938. His mother Krishnabai (née Mankikar) was a young widow with a son who belonged to a poor family. Since it was necessary for her to earn a living, she began working as a nurse and cook (general housekeeper) for the bedridden wife of a certain Raghunath Karnad, a doctor in the Bombay Medical Services.

Some five years later, and while the first wife was still alive, Krishnabai and Raghunath Karnad were married in a private ceremony. The marriage was controversial not because of bigamy (it was legal until 1956 for a Hindu man to have more than one wife) but because of the prevailing social prejudice against widow remarriage. Therefore, the wedding was held privately, and under the dispensation of the Arya Samaj, a reform organization that condones widow remarriage. Girish was the third of the four children born thereafter.

Karnad's initial schooling was in Marathi. Later, after his father was transferred to Sirsi in the Kannada-speaking regions of Bombay Presidency, Karnad was exposed to travelling theatre groups and nataka mandalis (theatre troupes), which were experiencing a period of efflorescence during the iconic Balgandharva era . As a youngster, he was an ardent admirer of Yakshagana and the theater in his village. His family moved to Dharwad in Karnataka when he was fourteen, where he grew up with his two sisters and a niece.

After completing his schooling at the Basel Mission Boys School, Dharwad, he earned his Bachelor of Arts degree in mathematics and statistics from Karnataka Arts College, Dharwad (Karnataka University), in 1958. After graduation, he went to England and studied philosophy, Politics and Economics at Magdalen in Oxford as a Rhodes Scholar (1960–63), earning his Master of Arts degree in philosophy, political science and economics. Karnad was elected the President of the Oxford Union in 1962–63.

== Career ==
After working with the Oxford University Press, Chennai for seven years (1963–70), he resigned to take to writing full-time. While in Madras (now known as Chennai) he got involved with local amateur theatre group, The Madras Players.

During 1987–88, he was at the University of Chicago as visiting professor and Fulbright playwright-in-residence. During his tenure at Chicago Nagamandala had its world premiere at the Guthrie Theater in Minneapolis based on Karnad's English translation of the Kannada original.

He served as director of the Film and Television Institute of India (1974–1975) and chairman of the Sangeet Natak Akademi, the national academy of the performing arts (1988–93). He served as director of the Nehru Centre and as Minister of Culture, in the Indian High Commission, London (2000–2003).

=== Literature ===
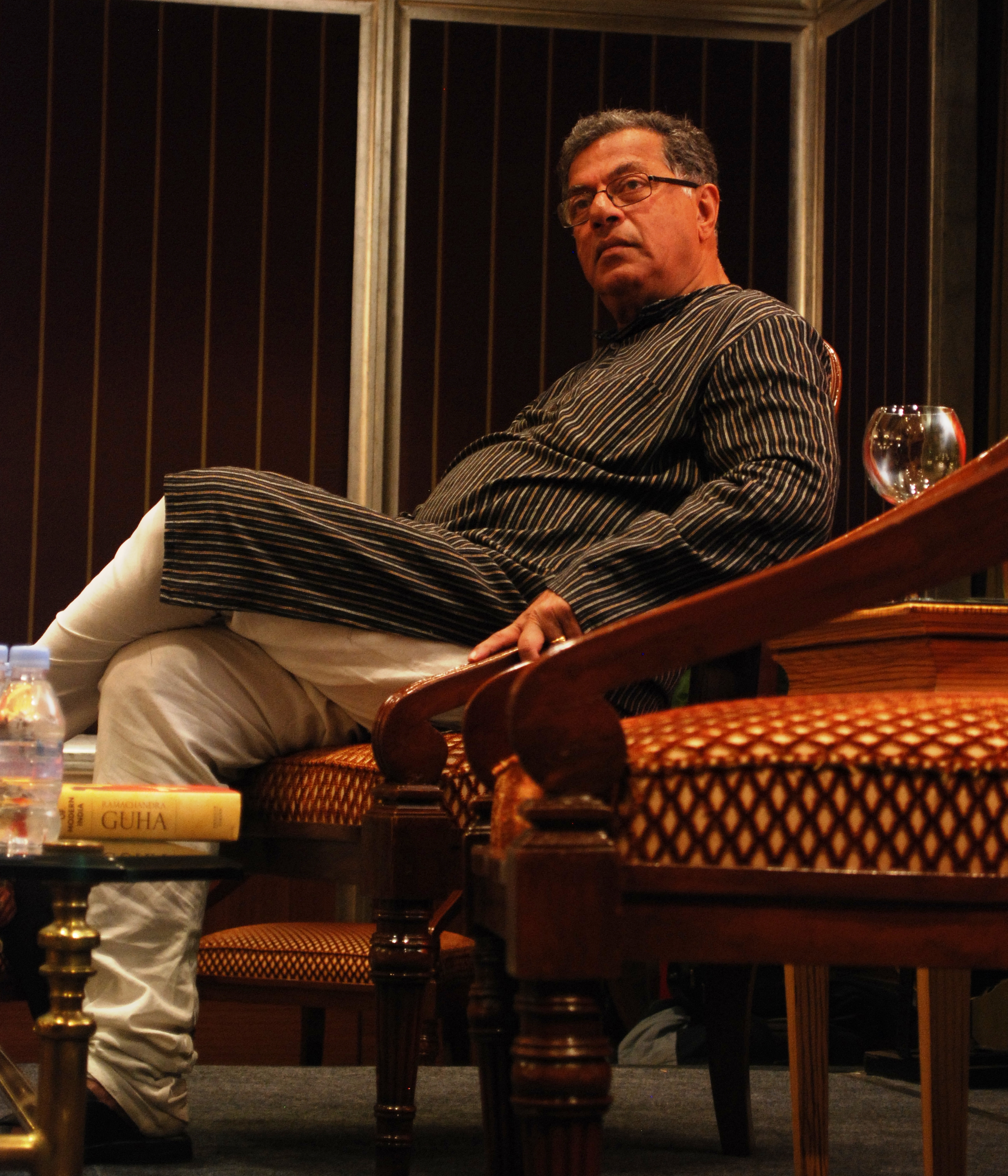
Karnad in 2010

Karnad is known as a playwright. His plays, written in Kannada, have been translated into English (mostly translated by himself) and some Indian languages. Kannada is his language of choice.

When Karnad started writing plays, Kannada literature was highly influenced by the renaissance in Western literature. Writers would choose a subject that looked entirely alien to manifestation of native soil. C. Rajagopalachari's version of the Mahabharata published in 1951, left a deep impact on him and soon, sometime in the mid-1950s, one day he experienced a rush of dialogues by characters from the Mahabharata in Kannada.

"I could actually hear the dialogues being spoken into my ears ... I was just the scribe," said Karnad in a later interview. Yayati was published in 1961, when he was 23 years old. It is based on the story of King Yayati, one of the ancestors of the Pandavas, who was cursed into premature old age by his preceptor, Shukracharya, who was incensed at Yayati's infidelity.

Yayati, in turn, asks his sons to sacrifice their youth for him, and one of them agrees. It ridicules the ironies of life through characters in Mahabharata. The play in Hindi was adapted by Satyadev Dubey and Amrish Puri was lead actor for the play. It became an instant success, immediately translated and staged in several other Indian languages.

Karnad found a new approach of drawing historical and mythological sources to tackle contemporary themes and existentialist crisis of modern man through characters locked in psychological and philosophical conflicts. His next was Tughlaq (1964), about a rashly idealist 14th-century Sultan of Delhi, Muhammad bin Tughluq, and allegory on the Nehruvian era which started with ambitious idealism and ended up in disillusionment. This established Karnad, now 26 years old, as a promising playwright in the country. It was staged by the National School of Drama Repertory under the direction of Ebrahim Alkazi, with the actor Manohar Singh, playing the visionary king who later becomes disillusioned and turns bitter, amidst the historic Purana Qila in Delhi. It was staged in London by the National School of Drama for the Festival of India in 1982.

Hayavadana (1971) was based on a theme drawn from The Transposed Heads, a 1940 novella by Thomas Mann, which is originally found in the 11th-century Sanskrit text Kathasaritsagara. Herein he employed the folk theatre form of Yakshagana. A German version of the play was directed by Vijaya Mehta as part of the repertoire of the Deutsches National Theatre, Weimar.

Naga-Mandala (Play with Cobra, 1988) was based on a folk tale related to him by A. K. Ramanujam, brought him the Karnataka Sahitya Academy Award for the Most Creative Work of 1989. It was directed by J. Garland Wright, as part of the celebrations of the 30th anniversary of Guthrie Theatre, Minneapolis. The theatre subsequently commissioned him to write the play, Agni Mattu Male (The Fire and the Rain). Though before it came Taledanda (Death by Beheading, 1990) which used the backdrop, the rise of Veerashaivism, a radical protest and reform movement in 12th century Karnataka to bring out current issues.

=== Movies ===
Karnad made his acting as well as screenwriting debut in a Kannada movie, Samskara (1970), based on a novel by U.R. Ananthamurthy and directed by Pattabhirama Reddy. That movie won the first President's Golden Lotus Award for Kannada cinema.

In television, he played the role of Swami's father in the TV series Malgudi Days (1986–1987), based on R. K. Narayan's books, directed by Kannada actor and director Shankar Nag. He also hosted the science magazine Turning Point on Doordarshan, in the early 1990s.

He made his directorial debut with Vamsha Vriksha (1971), based on a Kannada novel by S. L. Bhyrappa. It won him National Film Award for Best Direction along with B. V. Karanth, who co-directed the film. Later, Karnad directed several movies in Kannada and Hindi, including Godhuli (1977), Utsav (1984) and Cheluvi (1992). Karnad has made number of documentaries, like one on the Kannada poet D. R. Bendre (1972), Kanaka-Purandara (English, 1988) on two medieval Bhakti poets of Karnataka, Kanaka Dasa and Purandara Dasa, and The Lamp in the Niche (English, 1989) on Sufism and the Bhakti movement. Many of his films and documentaries have won several national and international awards.

Some of his famous Kannada movies include Tabbaliyu Neenade Magane, Ondanondu Kaladalli and Kaadu and most recent film Kanooru Heggaditi (1999), based on a novel by Kannada writer Kuvempu.

His Hindi movies include Nishaant (1975), Manthan (1976), Swami (1977), and Pukar (2000). He has acted in a number of Nagesh Kukunoor films, starting with Iqbal (2005), where Karnad's role of the ruthless cricket coach got him critical acclaim. This was followed by Dor (2006), 8 x 10 Tasveer (2009) and Aashayein (2010). He played a key role in movies Ek Tha Tiger (2012) and its sequel Tiger Zinda Hai (2017) produced by Yash Raj Films.

Karnad has acted in the Kannada gangster movie Aa Dinagalu.

=== Other works ===
He provided the voice of A. P. J. Abdul Kalam, former President of India, in the audiobook of Kalam's autobiography by Charkha Audiobooks, Wings of Fire. He narrated and recorded a collection of folk and mythological stories as 'Karadi the Bear' for the children's book publisher Karadi Tales (Charkha is also an initiative of Karadi Tales for young adults).

== Awards and honours ==
=== For Literature ===
- Rajyotsava Award – 1970
- Sangeet Natak Akademi award and Varthur navya Award – 1972
- Padma Shri – 1974
- Padma Bhushan – 1992
- Kannada Sahitya Parishat Award – 1992
- Sahitya Academy award – 1994
- Jnanapith Award – 1998
- Kalidas Samman – 1998
- Honorary doctorate by University of Southern California, Los Angeles – 2011

=== For Cinema ===
National Film Awards

- 1971: Best Direction: Vamsha Vriksha (with B. V. Karanth)
- 1971: Best Feature Film in Kannada: Vamsha Vriksha
- 1973: Second Best Feature Film: Kaadu
- 1977: Best Feature Film in Kannada: Tabbaliyu Neenade Magane
- 1978: Best Screenplay: Bhumika (with Shyam Benegal and Satyadev Dubey)
- 1978: Best Feature Film in Kannada: Ondanondu Kaladalli
- 1989: Best Non-Feature Film: Kanaka Purandara
- 1990: Best Non-feature Film on Social Issues: The Lamp in the Niche
- 1992: Best Film on Environment Conservation: Cheluvi
- 1999: Best Feature Film in Kannada: Kaanuru Heggadathi

Filmfare Awards South

- 1972: Filmfare Award for Best Director - Kannada – Vamsha Vriksha
- 1974: Filmfare Award for Best Director - Kannada – Kaadu
- 1978: Filmfare Award for Best Director - Kannada – Ondanondu Kaladalli
- 1983: Filmfare Award for Best Actor - Kannada - Ananda Bhairavi

Filmfare Awards Hindi

- 1980: Filmfare Award for Best Screenplay: Godhuli (with B. V. Karanth)
- 1980: Nominated - Filmfare Award for Best Supporting Actor: Aasha
- 1982: Nominated - Filmfare Award for Best Supporting Actor: Teri Kasam

Karnataka State Film Awards

- 1971-72: First Best Film – Vamsha Vriksha
- 1971-72: Best Dialogue Writer – Vamsha Vriksha
- 1973-74: Second Best Film – Kaadu
- 1989-90: Best Supporting Actor – Santha Shishunala Sharifa
- 1995-96: Best Supporting Actor – Sangeetha Sagara Ganayogi Panchakshara Gavai
- 1999-00: Second Best Film – Kanooru Heggadithi

=== Others ===
- Gubbi Veeranna Award for his services to theatre (as a playwright)
- Karnad served as the director of the Film and Television Institute of India from 1974 to 1975, the Indian co-chairman for the Joint Media Committee of the Indo-US Sub-Commission on Education and Culture from 1984 to 1993, chairman of the Sangeet Natak Academy from 1988 to 1993, and president of Karnataka Nataka Academy from 1976 to 1978.
- Honorary Doctorate from University of Southern California, Los Angeles – 2011
- 1996 -Dr.T.M.A.Pai Konkani Distinguished Achievement Award for Performing Arts

== Controversies ==
At the Tata Literary Festival held in Mumbai in 2012, Karnad was invited to speak about "his life in theater" in an hour-long session. During his speech, he lashed out at V. S. Naipaul for his "antipathy towards Indian Muslims". Naipaul had earlier been conferred the Lifetime achievement award by the festival's organisers. Karnad also criticized the organizers for having honored Naipaul. The audience, which had gathered to hear Karnad speak, had mixed reactions to the speech. Some, like organizer Anil Dharker, tried ineffectually to steer the speech toward less controversial waters. Others were amused by the episode, and some commented on the research and logic that had gone into the speech (unfortunately overshadowed by its 'scandalous' nature).

Just a few weeks after this, Karnad again created controversy by claiming that Rabindranath Tagore, who wrote India's national anthem, was a great poet but a second-rate playwright.

In November 2015, during celebrations marking the anniversary of 18th-century Muslim ruler Tipu Sultan's birth, Karnad stated that Bangalore International Airport should have been named after Tipu Sultan instead of Kempe Gowda. This created a furore among many people. Karnad apologised the following day.

== Personal life ==
While working in Madras for Oxford University Press on his return from England, Karnad met his future wife Saraswathi Ganapathy at a party. They decided to marry but the marriage was only formalised ten years later, when Karnad was 42 years old. Saraswathi was born to a Parsi mother, Nurgesh Mugaseth, and a Kodava Hindu father, Kodandera Ganapathy. The couple had two children. They lived in Bengaluru. He was extremely fluent and well-versed in Kannada, Konkani, Hindi, Marathi, and English.

== Activism ==
He was a proponent of multiculturalism and freedom of expression. He was a critic of religious fundamentalism. He had publicly condemned the demolition of Babri Masjid in 1992 and later spoke against the attempts to create controversy about the Idgah Maidan in Hubli. He had opposed RSS, BJP and other organizations on several occasions. He opposed Narendra Modi for the Prime Minister's post in the 2014 parliament elections. He was one of the 200 writers who put out an open letter against hate politics and for “diverse and equal India” during the 2019 general elections. With a tube in his nose, he wore a placard saying "Me Too Urban Naxal" at the first death anniversary of slain journalist Gauri Lankesh. Karnad claimed that Tipu Sultan was the greatest king Karnataka had in 500 years, on a religious controversy about the king. Karnad was a supporter of the Forum for Communal Harmony.

== Death ==
Karnad died on 10 June 2019 at Bengaluru at the age of 81 due to multiple organ failure following prolonged illness. "After a discussion with his son, it was made clear to us that his last wish was to not have any floral procession, VVIPs or visits of any dignitaries. Hence, it will be a simple affair."

== Bibliography ==
=== Plays in Kannada ===
- Maa Nishaadha (One Act Play)
- Yayati (1961)
- Tughlaq (1964) (translated in Hindustani by B. V. Karanth. Major Indian directors who have staged it: Ebrahim Alkazi, Prasanna, Arvind Gaur, Dinesh Thakur & Shyamanand Jalan (in Bengali).
- Hayavadana (1971)
- Anjumallige (1977) (translated in Bengali name "JAMINI", by Biswa Roy, Director Film and T.V media. Published by Papyrus, in the year January 2007. )
- Hittina Hunja aka Bali (The Sacrifice) (1980)
- Nagamandala (1988) (Play with Cobra), based on the script of this play, Nagamandala, A movie in Kannada language was released in 1997, starring Prakash Raj and Vijayalakshmi.
- Taledanda (1990) (Death by Beheading), in Hindi it is known as Rakt-Kalyan translated by Ram Gopal Bajaj, first directed by Ebrahim Alkazi for NSD rep., then by Arvind Gaur (1995–2008, still running) for Asmita Theater Group, New Delhi.
- Agni mattu Male (1995) (Agni Aur Varsha, The Fire and the Rain), first directed by Prasanna for NSD Rep.
- Tipu Sultan Kanda Kanasu (The Dreams of Tipu Sultan)
- Odakalu Bimba (2006) (Hindi, Bikre Bimb; English, A heap of Broken Images)
- Maduve Album (2006)
- Flowers (2012)
- Benda Kaalu on Toast (2012)
- Rakshasa Tangadi (2018)

=== Plays translated in English ===
- Tughlaq, OUP.
- Hayavadana, OUP.
- Yayati, OUP.
- Nagamandala: Play with Cobra, OUP.
- Fire and the Rain, OUP, 1998.
- Bali: The Sacrifice, OUP.
- Tale Danda, OUP.
- Wedding Album, OUP, 2006.
- Boiled Beans on Toast, OUP, 2014.
- Crossing to Talikota, OUP, 2019.
- Collected Plays: Volume One:Tughlaq, Hayavadana, Bali: The Sacrifice, and Naga Mandala, OUP India, 2020.
- Collected Plays: Volume Two: Tale-Danda, The Fire and the Rain, The Dreams of Tipu Sultan, Two Monologues: Flowers and Broken Images, OUP India, 2020.
- Collected Plays: Volume Three: Yayati, Wedding Album, and Boiled Beans on Toast, OUP India, 2018,

== Filmography ==
=== Films ===
Year	Title	Role	Language	Notes
1970	Samskara	Praneshacharya	Kannada	
1971	Vamsha Vriksha	Raju (lecturer)	Kannada	
1974	Jadu Ka Shankh		Hindi	
1975	Nishaant	Schoolmaster	Hindi	
1976	Manthan	Dr. Rao	Hindi	
1977	Swami	Ghanshyam	Hindi	
1977	Jeevan Mukt	Amarjeet	Hindi	
1978	Sandharbha	Psychiatrist	Kannada	Special appearance
1979	Sampark	Heera	Hindi	
1979	Ratnadeep	Madan	Hindi	
1980	Beqasoor	Dr. Anand Bhatnagar	Hindi	
1980	Aasha	Deepak	Hindi	
1980	Man Pasand	Kashinath	Hindi	
1980	Apne Paraye	Harish	Hindi	
1981	Shama	Nawab Yusuf Khan	Hindi	
1982	Umbartha	Advocate Subhash Mahajan	Marathi	
1982	Aparoopa	Mr. Khanna	Assamese	
1982	Teri Kasam	Rakesh	Hindi	
1983	Ananda Bhairavi	Narayana Sarma	Kannada; Telugu	Bilingual Film
1983	Ek Baar Chale Aao	Din Dayal	Hindi	
1983	Anveshane	Rotti	Kannada	
1984	Tarang	Dinesh	Hindi	
1984	Divorce		Hindi	
1985	Nee Thanda Kanike	Rao Bahadur Raja Ram Mohan Rao	Kannada	
1985	Zamana	Satish Kumar	Hindi	
1985	Meri Jung	Deepak Verma	Hindi	
1985	Sur Sangam	Pandit Shivshankar Shastri	Hindi	
1986	Nenapina Doni		Kannada	
1986	Neela Kurinji Poothappol	Appu Menon	Malayalam	
1986	Naan Adimai Illai	Rajasekhar	Tamil	
1987	Sutradhar	Zamindar	Hindi	
1988	Kaadina Benki		Kannada	
1988	Akarshan		Hindi	
1989	Prathama Ushakirana	Doctor	Kannada	
1989	Mil Gayee Manzil Mujhe		Hindi	
1990	Santha Shishunala Sharifa	Govindabhatta	Kannada	
1990	Nehru: The Jewel of India		Hindi	
1991	Mysore Mallige	Padma's Father	Kannada	
1991	Chaitanya	Retired Major Harischandra Prasad	Telugu	
1991	Antarnaad		Hindi	
1991	Gunaa	Dr. Ganesh	Tamil	
1992	Cheluvi	Village Headman	Hindi	
1992	Pranadaata		Telugu	
1993	Jeevana Vedam		Telugu	
1994	Poorna Sathya		Kannada	
1994	Kaadhalan	Kakarla Satyanarayana Murti (Governor of Tamil Nadu)	Tamil	
1994	Aagatha	Psychiatrist	Kannada	
1995	Sangeetha Sagara Ganayogi Panchakshara Gavai	Hanagal Kumaraswamiji	Kannada	
1996	Dharma Chakram	Mahendra	Telugu	
1996	Aatank	Inspector Khan	Hindi	
1996	The Prince	Vishwanath	Malayalam	
1997	Ratchagan	Sriram	Tamil	
1997	Minsaara Kanavu	Amal Raj	Tamil	
1998	China Gate	Sunder Rajan (Forest Officer)	Hindi	
1998	Rajahamsa	Ram Prasad	Telugu	
1998	Kadhal Mannan	Rudran (Black Dog Security Chief)	Tamil	
1998	April Fool	A. N. Ramakrishnaiah (Chief Minister of Karnataka)	Kannada	
1998	Aakrosh: Cyclone of Anger	Rajwansh Shashtri	Hindi	
1999	Kanooru Heggadithi	Chandregowda	Kannada	Director also
1999	AK-47	Jagannath Rao	Kannada	
1999	AK-47	Jagannatham	Telugu	
1999	Janumadatha	Dr. Akbar Ali	Kannada	
1999	Prathyartha	Sheshanag Dixit (Home Minister of India)	Kannada	
2000	Pukar	Mr. Rajvansh	Hindi	
2000	Hey Ram	Uppilli Iyengar	Tamil	
2001	Vande Matharam	Mr. Ballal	Kannada	
2003	Tiger Harischandra Prasad	Prime Minister	Telugu	Cameo appearance
2003	Anjaneya		Tamil	
2004	Chellamae	Rajasekhar	Tamil	
2004	Shankar Dada MBBS	Satya Prasad	Telugu	
2005	Iqbal	Guruji	Hindi	
2006	Dor	Randhir Singh	Hindi	
2006	Tananam Tananam	Krishnamurthy	Kannada	
2006	Amirtham	Ramaswamy Iyengar	Tamil	
2007	Aa Dinagalu	Girish Nayak	Kannada	Screenplay Writer also
2007	Lava Kusha	Ranga Rao	Kannada	
2008	Chilipili Hakkigalu	School Master	Kannada	
2008	Sangaathi		Kannada	
2008	Dhanam	Ananth' Father	Tamil	
2009	8 x 10 Tasveer	Anil Sharma	Hindi	
2009	Aashayein	Parthasarthi	Hindi	
2009	Life Goes On	Sanjay	English	
2010	Komaram Puli	Narasimha Rao (Prime Minister)	Telugu	
2011	Narthagi		Tamil	
2011	Kempe Gowda	Mahadev Gowda	Kannada	
2012	Ek Tha Tiger	Dr. Ajit Shenoy (RAW Chief)	Hindi	
2012	Mugamoodi	Lee's Grandfather	Tamil	
2012	Yaare Koogadali	Doctor	Kannada	
2013	Sweety Nanna Jodi	Priya's Father	Kannada	
2014	Samrat & Co.	Mahendra Pratap Singh	Hindi	
2014	Savaari 2	Vishwanath	Kannada	
2015	Rudra Tandava	Shivaraj's father	Kannada	
2015	Rana Vikrama	K. V. Anand Rao	Kannada	
2015	Chandrika		Kannada	
2015	Guru Dakshina	Guruji	Hindi	
2016	24	Sathya's Grandfather	Tamil	
2016	Shivaay	Anushka's father	Hindi	
2016	Chalk n Duster	Manohar Sawant	Hindi	
2017	Tiger Zinda Hai	Dr. Ajit Shenoy (RAW Chief)	Hindi	
2018	Neenillada Male		Kannada	
2019	Pora		Kannada	
2019	Sketch For Love		Telugu	
2019	Vidura		Kannada	

=== TV series ===
- Malgudi Days (1987)
  - as Swamy's father in Swamy and Friends (Episodes 1 to 8)
  - as the Watchman in The Watchman (episode 17)
- Indradhanush (1989) as Appu and Bala's father
- Khandaan (TV series)
- Apna Apna Aasman
- Swarajnama as the main host and director, aired on DD1 and Doordarshan

=== Films directed ===
- Vamsha Vriksha (1971, Kannada)
- D.R. Bendre (1972, Kannada documentary)
- Tabbaliyu Neenade Magane (1977, Kannada)
- Godhuli (1977, Hindi)
- Ondanondu Kaladalli (1978, Kannada)
- Kanooru Heggadithi (1999, Kannada)
- Kaadu (1973, Kannada)
- Utsav (1984, Hindi)
- Woh Ghar (1984, Hindi), based on Kirtinath Kurtakoti's Kannada play Aa Mani
- The Lamp in the Niche (1990, English documentary)
- Cheluvi (1992, Hindi)
- Chidambara Rahasya (2005, Kannada) (TV film for DD1)

== Production ==
- Om Namo (A mini series for Dooradarshan, directed by K M Chaitanya)
- Kusuma Bale (A mini series for Dooradarshan, directed by K M Chaitanya)

== Other works ==
- Evam Indrajit (English) by Badal Sircar. Translated by Girish Karnad. 1974.

== Works in Translation ==
- Yayati. Oxford University Press.
- Yayati (Hindi). Tr. by B. R. Narayan. Rajkamal Prakashan Pvt Ltd, 2008. ISBN 81-7119-627-6.
- Tughlaq: A play in 13 scenes, Oxford Univ. Press, 1972
- Tughlaq (Assamese). Translation Utpal Datta. Assam Publication Board. 2005
- Nagamandala (Assamese) Translation. Utpal Datta. Assam Publication Board. 2005
- Hayavadana, Oxford University Press, 1975.
- Tughlaq (Marathi), Tras. Vijay Tendulkar. Popular Prakashan Pvt. Ltd. ISBN 81-7185-370-6.
- Three Plays: Naga-Mandala; Hayavadana; Tughlaq. Oxford University Press, 1996. ISBN 0-19-563765-8.
- Tughlaq (Hindi). Tr. by B. V. Karanth. Rajkamal Prakashan Pvt Ltd, 2005. ISBN 81-7119-790-6.
- Collected Plays: Volume One:Tughlaq, Hayavadana, Bali: The Sacrifice, and Naga Mandala, OUP India, 2020. ISBN 0190127694
- Collected Plays: Volume Two: Tale-Danda, The Fire and the Rain, The Dreams of Tipu Sultan, Two Monologues: Flowers and Broken Images, OUP India, 2020. ISBN 0190127686
- Collected Plays: Volume Three: Yayati, Wedding Album, and Boiled Beans on Toast, OUP India, 2018. ISBN 0190129182
- Three Plays by Girish Karnad. Oxford University Press. ISBN 0-19-563765-8.

== Autobiography ==
- Aadaadtha Aayushya. Manohara Grantha Mala, 2011.
- This Life At Play: Memoirs. Translated by Girish Karnad and Srinath Perur. Fourt Estate, 2021.
