= Manohar Singh =

Indian actor (1938–2002)

- Singh in the play Tughlaq
- Born: 12 April 1938; Shimla, Punjab, British India
- Died: 14 November 2002 (aged 64); New Delhi, India
- Years active: 1971–2002
- Known for: Tughlaq
- Awards: 1982 Sangeet Natak Akademi Award

Manohar Singh (12 April 1938 – 14 November 2002) was an Indian theatre actor-director and character actor in Hindi films. He is best known for his performances in films such as Party (1984) and Daddy (1989). Starting his acting career in theatre, he went on to become a theatre director and later the chief of National School of Drama Repertory Company, from 1976 to 1988, before switching to cinema. As a theatre actor his best known performances were in Tughlaq, directed by Ebrahim Alkazi; Himmat Mai and Begum Barve by Nissar and Amal Allana.

He was awarded the 1982 Sangeet Natak Akademi Award for Acting (Hindi theatre) by Sangeet Natak Akademi. In 2003, a photo exhibition on his work in theatre was organized at the Art Heritage gallery, Delhi chronicling his journey in theatre starting from his first play The Caucasian Chalk Circle (1968), as a student at the National School of Drama, to plays such as Tughlaq, King Lear, Kaho Katha Khajuraho Ki, Himmat Mai (Mother Courage) and The Threepenny Opera.

He provides the voice-over in the annual Shriram Bharatiya Kala Kendra production "Ram". The audience can hear the commentary in his voice, providing structure and continuity to the narrative.

== Biography ==
Born in 1938 in a very small village called Khwara Chowki in Shoghi, Shimla in Himachal Pradesh, Manohar Singh got his first job in the state government-run Drama Division. He graduated from National School of Drama (NSD) in 1971, and soon after started directing plays with NSD Repertory Company, starting with Qatl Ki Hawas in 1971. Later in 1976 he became the second chief of the NSD Repertory Company and remained so until 1988. He was awarded the 1982 Sangeet Natak Akademi Award by Sangeet Natak Akademi, India's National Academy of Music, Dance and Drama.

He is best known for his spectacular performance in the title role of Tughlaq, directed by his mentor Ebrahim Alkazi, the founder of NSD. After quitting NSD in the late 80s, he got active in the Delhi theatre scene, doing some memorable plays such as Pagla Raja (King Lear), Himmat Mai (Brecht's Mother Courage), Begum Barve and Nagamandalam (Girish Karnad), with well-known theatre personalities, Amal and Nissar Allana.

He had a long film and television career that started with the controversial film based on an emergency, Kissa Kursi Ka, that also starred Shabana Azmi. He did Govind Nihalani's Party, Mrinal Sen's Ek Din Achanak, Yeh Woh Manzil To Nahin, Rudaali, Mahesh Bhatt directed films - Daddy and Gunaah, and went on to play many powerful roles in over 27 films, including Yash Chopra‘s films such as Chandni and Lamhe. His last film was Everybody Says I'm Fine! in 2001.

He appeared in many successful serials on television, including Neena Gupta's Dard and Pal Chhin.

He died of lung cancer on 14 November 2002, in New Delhi.

== Filmography ==
=== Films ===
- Kissa Kursi Ka (1977)
- Party (1984)
- Damul (1985)
- Tamas (1986)
- New Delhi Times (1986)
- Yeh Woh Manzil To Nahin (1987)
- Main Azaad Hoon (1989)
- Daddy (1989)
- Ek Din Achanak (1989)
- Chandni (1989)
- Hamari Shaadi (1990)
- Lekin... (1990)
- Patthar Ke Phool (1991)
- Kasba (1991)
- Diksha (1991)
- Lamhe (1991)
- Sadak (1991)
- Tirangaa (1992)
- Karm Yodha (1992)
- Rudaali (1993)
- Gunaah (1993)
- Divya Shakti (1993)
- Aaja Meri Jaan (1993)
- 1942: A Love Story (1993)
- Tarpan (1994)
- Dushmani: A Violent Love Story (1995)
- Bhairavi (1996)
- Everybody Says I'm Fine! (2001)

=== Television ===
- Raag Durbari (TV series)
- Mulla Nasiruddin (TV series) (1990)
- Kahkashan (TV series) (1991)
- Raj Se Swaraj (TV series)
- Dard (TV series) (1993)
- Gumraah (TV series) (1995)
- Khamosh (TV series) (1996)
- Mahayagya (1997)
- Tere Mere Sapne (1998)
- Pal Chhin (TV series) (1999)

== Theatrography ==
- Caucasian Chalk Circle (1968)
- Antigone (1975)
- Tughlaq (1975)
- Look Back in Anger
- Othello
- Danton's Death
- King Lear
- Three Penny Opera
- Mahabhoj
- Nagamandal
- Kaho Katha Khajuraho Ki
- Himmat Mai
- Begum Barve

== Legacy ==
In 2003, NSD instituted an award in his memory, titled Manohar Singh Smriti Puruskar, to be awarded to a young graduate (up to the age of 50) of the school.

== See also ==
- Theatre of India
- Bhartendu Academy of Dramatic Arts
