= Tarpan (film) =

- Directed by: K. Bikram Singh
- Written by: Neelabh; K. Bikram Singh
- Produced by: NFDC; Doordarshan
- Starring: Om Puri; Revathy; Dina Pathak; Manohar Singh; Mita Vashisht
- Cinematography: Venu
- Edited by: Renu Saluja
- Music by: Rajat Dholakia
- Release date: 1994
- Running time: 140 min
- Country: India
- Language: Hindi

Tarpan (English title: The Absolution) was a 1994 Indian Hindi drama film written and directed by K. Bikram Singh, and starring Om Puri, Revathy, Dina Pathak, Manohar Singh and Mita Vashisht in lead roles. This directorial debut film was jointly produced by NFDC and Doordarshan. The film set in the 1940s, in a fictitious village in the Shekhavati region in Rajasthan, where no girl child survives beyond the age of seven. It deals with larger issues of communalism and caste system through four inter-related stories.

The film was screened at Moscow International Film Festival, Montreal World Film Festival, Chicago International Film Festival and Cairo International Film Festival.

== Cast ==
- Om Puri as Jassu Kaka
- Revathy as Sumitra
- Dina Pathak as Rammo
- Manohar Singh as Sarpanch (Thakur Bir Singh)
- Mita Vashisht as Lachmi
- Ravi Jhankal as Joravar
- Savita Bajaj as Chintho Singh
- Virendra Saxena as Sukku Baba
- Rajendra Gupta as Lakhan Singh
- Vijay Kashyap as Phattu
- Lalit Tiwari as Jeetu Thakur
- Pavan Malhotra as Dhannu
- Anang Desai as Pratap Singh
- Babita Bhardwaj as Ganga
- Pradeep Bhatnagar as Vaid
- Rekha Kanda as Vidya
- Madhvi Kaushik as Mrs. Jeetu
- Usha Nagar as Dhannu's mom
- Zahida Parveen as Santosh

== Awards ==
- Aravindhan award for best debut director.
