= Daaman =

- Genre: Drama
- Written by: Mujeeb Khan
- Directed by: Salim Arif
- Starring: See below
- Theme music composer: Murad Siddiqi
- Country of origin: India
- Original language: Hindi
- No. of seasons: 1

Production
- Camera setup: Multi-camera
- Running time: Approx. 24 minutes

Original release
- Network: Sahara One

Daaman (transl. Hem), set in the Muslim backdrop, is an Indian television drama series that aired on Sahara TV now as Sahara One in 2001. The series won 'Best Location Sound' category award at the RAPA Awards in 2002.

== Cast ==
- Shyam Bhanushali
- Beena Banerjee
- S M Zaheer
- Lubna Salim
- Himani Shivpuri ... Fakhrunissa
- Aamir Bashir
- Vaquar Shaikh
- Naved Aslam
