= Meri Doli Tere Angana =

Indian television series

- A promotional logo image of "Meri Doli Tere Angana".
- Directed by: Yash Chauhan, Ismail Umar Khan, Manish Jain
- Starring: see below
- Opening theme: "Meri Doli Tere Angana" by Richa Sharma
- Country of origin: India
- No. of episodes: 215

Production
- Producer: Rahul Bhat
- Running time: 24 minutes

Original release
- Network: Zee TV
- Release: 21 May 2007 – 16 May 2008

Meri Doli Tere Angana is a Hindi TV serial that aired on Zee TV. It was based on the concept of a struggle of a woman who is totally committed and believes in herself. It's her strength that will stand by her through the difficult times. Produced by Rahul Bhat and Sharika Sharma Bhat under their home production banner Filmtonic Entertainment (Pvt) Ltd.

== Plot ==
The serial is based on a girl named Simran, an orphan who has been brought up by her aunt and uncle. They are everything to her, therefore she believes that whatever they choose for her will be for the best. When Simran goes for an arranged marriage, she marries Ruhaan, who belongs to one of the wealthiest families in the city. However, on the day of her marriage, Ruhaan reveals that he loves someone else. This brings Simran at a crossroads where she can't go back to her house because her uncle is a cardiac patient, nor she can move forward with what Ruhaan told her.

Like a traditional Indian woman, Simran decides to abide by her responsibilities as a wife, daughter and daughter-in-law of Ruhaan's prestigious Oberoi family. She decides to fight against the shadow of her husband's past and get her husband back. When Ruhaan and Simran go to Goa for their honeymoon, he learns that the girl he loves is married to someone else. Now, he tries to change and starts having feelings for Simran. After a few very predictable misunderstandings, Simran and Ruhaan are reunited. Suhana, Ruhaan's former love, returns and tries to win him back. She conspires against Simran to make Ruhaan's family hate her but after a while, her plans are exposed. Suhana, in a fit of rage, shoots at Simran and Ruhaan, who stumbles off a cliff. Unfortunately, Simran dies but Ruhaan is saved by a girl named Sargam (the new protagonist), who takes him to her home. However, Ruhaan has lost his memory and does not remember anything about Simran or his past.

Ruhaan starts living with this new family. Sargam will marry Vedant, her childhood friend, but begins to grow feelings for Ruhaan and eventually marries the latter. He, however, tells Sargam that until he regains his memory, he will not consummate their marriage. One day, Ruhaan finally remembers everything when he sees his father Naresh. Eventually, Ruhaan returns to Oberoi house with Naresh and Sargam, but remains haunted and tormented by memories of Simran.

== Cast ==
- Priyamvada Sawant as Simran Ruhaan Oberoi (2007-2008)
- Gaurav Khanna as Ruhaan Oberoi (2007-2008)
- Nausheen Ali Sardar as Suhana (2007-2008)
- Shruti Sharma as Sargam Ruhaan Oberoi (2008)
- Geeta Khanna as Mrs. Oberoi
- Vikram Sahu as Naresh Oberoi
- Madhavi Gogate as Madhavi Naresh Oberoi
- Sachin Chhabra as Ruhaan Oberoi (2008)
- Aditi Sajwan as Arpita Oberoi
- Akshat Gupta as Abhishek (Abhi)
- Zeb Khan as Inder (Arpita's husband)
- Seema Pandey as Sandhya Niranjan Oberoi
- Rajshree Debnath as Sandhya Niranjan Oberoi
- Pankaj Vishnu as Niranjan Oberoi
- Sahil Chauhan as Pinto
- Amreen as Riya
- Pankaj Berry as Rajveer Malhotra
- Tiya Gandwani as Kiran Rajveer Malhotra
- Shikha Singh as Amrapali
- Poonam Gulati as Shanaya
- Jaskaran Singh as Karan
- Amita Nangia as Mrs. Saxena
- Gufi Paintal as Dr Vishal
- Rahul Lohani as Vedant
- Gajendra Chauhan as Mahendra
- Rajeev Verma as Bhargav Dadaji
- Madhuri Sanjeev as Durga
- Kuldeep Chaudhary as Santosh
