= Tughlaq (play) =

1964 Kannada-language play by Girish Karnad

Tughlaq is a 1964 Indian Kannada language play written by Girish Karnad. The thirteen-scene play is set during the reign of Muhammad bin Tughlaq (r. 1325 – 1351). It was first staged in Urdu in 1966, as a student production at National School of Drama. Most famously, it was staged at Purana Qila, Delhi in 1972. In 1970, it was enacted in English in Mumbai. Tughlaq, a 13-scene play by Girish Karnad, focuses on the 14th century Turko-Indian ruler. It is both a historical play as well as a commentary on the contemporary politics of the 1960s. The Times of India comments: "In the play, the protagonist, Tughlaq, is portrayed as having great ideas and a grand vision, but his reign was an abject failure. He started his rule with great ideals of a unified India, but his degenerated into anarchy and his kingdom."

== Plot ==
As the play opens, the reader is introduced to the court of Mohammad Bin Tughlaq, a Muslim Sultan (Emperor). Tughlaq declares that he is shifting his capital from Delhi to Daultabad (also known as Deogiri). Daultabad is in south India and at a long distance from Delhi. He has two purposes behind this decision. First, it will help him to rule over southern part of India effectively and increase fraternity and unity among Hindus and Muslims as Daultabad is a Hindu-majority city. Second, it will help him saving his capital against the attacks of Mongols from the north.

A man named, Aziz appears in the court. Aziz has changed his identity from a Muslim to a Hindu with a definite purpose. Tughlaq is well known for Secularism. Despite being a Muslim Sultan, Tughlaq shows a great heart towards Hindus. He desires to be seen as an idealist who wants a unity between Hindus and Muslims. In order to win hearts of Hindus, he favors Hindus more in his decisions and policies. So Aziz takes the name as Vishnu Prasad, a Hindu Brahmin. He has filed a case against sultan Tughlaq for acquiring his land unfairly. He is given a handsome amount on the name of land acquisition. Later in his court, he invites public to get settled in Daultabad. He doesn’t force the public but leaves it up to them whether to move or to remain there. Aziz, with his friend Aazam, plans to cheat people and get money on the way to Daultabad.

The scene shifts, as now Tughlaq is playing chess in his private chamber. His stepmother appears. She is quite concerned about his eccentric approach in his administration. It is also revealed that Tughlaq had murdered his father and his brother in the past to get to the throne. She scolds him for his negligence towards the uprising led by Ain-ul-Mulk, an old friend of Tughlaq. Ain-ul-Mulk has now turned into an enemy. He is marching with his thirty thousand soldiers to attack the state. On the other hand, Tughlaq has only six thousand soldiers. If the battle takes place, his defeat is quite certain. His stepmother asks Ziauddin Barani, a historian of that time, to keep Tughlaq away from the company of foolish advisors and councilors.

Sheikh-Imam-Uddin, another character, appears on the stage. He doesn’t like the Sultan at all. In fact, he incites the people against Tughlaq for his eccentric decisions. Tughlaq himself is well aware of the fact that Sheikh has ill desires against him. Tughlaq calls him and asks him to visit Ain-ul-Mulk with a proposal for peace. Sheikh is asked to be dressed as a royal person and is sent on an elephant. Tughlaq has done this with an intention. Later news comes that Sheikh-Imam-Uddin is murdered. He was mistaken for Tughlaq by the enemies for his royal dress and riding on elephant. Ratan Singh reveals that it was Tughlaq’s plot. This incident comes as a first instance of the dark side of his character.

Ratan Singh, Amirs and Sayyids are planning to murder the Sultan as there is no other way left for them to stop his foolish acts. They argue about Daultabad city and its Hindu majority population. They persuade Sihabuddin to join them. But he hasn't made up his mind yet. They plan to murder him during the prayer. Later their plan is revealed, they all are caught and beget death sentence. Tughlaq orders for their dead bodies to be hanged in public. He takes another ridiculous decision to have currency minted on copper and brass metal. Adding more to his foolishness, he declares that the all coins will have an equal value, no matter whether the coin is made of gold, silver, copper or brass. He also announces a ban on prayers. Even people now start terming him as a foolish Sultan. Now Tughlaq wants to shift there as soon as possible. On the way, many people die of hunger, disease, etc. Aziz appears with his friend Aazam and tells him how to deceive others and extract money.

Now the scene shifts to Daultabad. It is reported that Najib, a confidante and an advisor of Tughlaq, is murdered. His stepmother comes and scolds him that the economy of the state is collapsing as the people have minted so much fake currency on copper and brass. They have exchanged it for gold and silver coins. So his foolish decision is to be held accountable for this crisis. But Tughlaq is frustrated by Najib's murder. So many people, whomever he suspects, are executed. Finally it is revealed that Najib was poisoned by Tughlaq’s stepmother. When Tughlaq discovers this, he orders her arrest. She is stoned to death. All such decisions are presented as the severe frustrations of his mind.

It is announced to the public that when Ghiyasuddin-Abbasid arrives, the ban on the prayers will be lifted. But the people are no way interested in it as they are dying of hunger. The life of common man is devastated. But Tughlaq is preparing for Ghiyasuddin-Abbasid’s welcome. Aziz appears and murders Ghiyas-uddin-Abbasid. Now Aziz disguises himself as Ghiyas-uddin-Abbasid with a motive to fudge the Sultan. Aziz manages to deceive Tughlaq with his new identity. Later Aazam is murdered and somehow, his true identity is revealed to Tughlaq. Now Aziz tells him everything whatever he had done in past to cheat him. The revelation of these facts really impresses Tughlaq. He appoints him on a powerful position in his court. Having taken this decision, Tughlaq goes to sleep. When he wakes up, he realizes himself as he has gone mad. The play ends here.

== Characters ==
- Mohammad Bin Tughlaq - The Emperor
- His stepmother
- Aziz - A shrewd man who deceives Tughlaq with his disguise
- Aazam - A friend of Aziz and his partner
- Najib - An advisor and confidante of Tughlaq
- Barani - A historian and close associate of Tughlaq
- Sheikh Imam-ud-din - A critic of Tughlaq's foolish acts
- Shihab-ud-din -
- Sheikh Shams-ud-din -
- Ain-ul-Mulk - An old friend of Tughlaq who, later, turned into an enemy
- Ratansingh - Adopted brother of Shihab-ud-din
- Ghiyas-ud-din Abbasid - Descendant of Khalif Abbasid and guest of honour of Tughlaq

== Historical play ==
Prof. Asha Kuthari Chaudhuri then of the Gauhati University at Guwahati, has said of the play: "Tughlaq is based on the life and story of Mohammad-bin-Tughlaq -- the most controversial ruler of the Delhi sultanate. Tughlaq is defined as a historical play because the chief protagonist is a character taken from history and the play documents a series of past events that took place during the reign of Mohammad-bin-Tughlaq. Tughlaq can also be considered as a political play as it represents the reign of a king and his various moves to unify the Hindus and Muslims, and establish a just kingdom in Delhi."

== Symbolism ==
Writing in 2012, the research scholar M. Jagadeswari, argues: "Girish Karnad is the foremost playwright of modern India. Tughlaq, his second play, is a historical play replete with symbolism.... In the play, the symbols have a myriad of origin as well as forms. He used symbols to represent universal thoughts and emotions. His use of various symbols in the play such as Chess, Aziz and Aazam, Prayer, Python, Daulatabad, Rose and birds like Vulture add greater emotional and associative significance."

== Bibliography ==
- Tughlaq (Marathi), Tras. Vijay Tendulkar. Popular Prakashan Pvt. Ltd. ISBN 81-7185-370-6.
- Yayati (Hindi). Tr. by B. R. Narayan. Rajkamal Prakashan Pvt Ltd, 2008. ISBN 81-7119-627-6.
